= Street names of Fitzrovia =

This is a list of the etymology of street names in the London district of Fitzrovia. The following utilises the generally accepted boundaries of Fitzrovia viz. Euston Road to the north, Tottenham Court Road to the east, Oxford Street to the south and Great Portland Street to the west.

- Adam and Eve Court – from the former Adam and Eve tavern near here
- Bedford Passage – after the Bedford family, local landowners
- Berners Mews, Berners Place and Berners Street – after local 17th–18th-century landowners the Berners family
- Bolsover Street – after local landowners the dukes of Portland, Barons of Bolsover
- Booth's Place – after local 18th-century landowner Joseph Booth
- Bourlet Close – after Bourlet's, fine art agents formerly based here
- Bromley Place
- Bywell Place
- Candover Street – after Candover in Hampshire, where local landowners dukes of Portland owned land
- Carburton Street – after Carburton, Nottinghamshire, where local landowners dukes of Portland owned land
- Charlotte Mews, Charlotte Place and Charlotte Street – after Charlotte of Mecklenburg-Strelitz, wife of King George III
- Chitty Street – after the Victorian-era local resident and law writer Joseph Chitty
- Cleveland Mews and Cleveland Street – after Barbara Palmer, 1st Duchess of Cleveland, founder of the house of the Fitzroy family, local landowners
- Clipstone Mews and Clipstone Street – after Clipstone, Nottinghamshire, where local landowners dukes of Portland owned land
- Colville Place – after its 18th-century builder John Colvill (or Colville)
- Conway Mews and Conway Street – after Isabella FitzRoy, Duchess of Grafton, Baroness Conway, part of the local landowning Fitzroy family
- Cypress Place – by association with the nearby Maple Street
- Eastcastle Street – after the former nearby pub The Castle; it was formerly Little Castle Street
- Euston Road – after the earl of Euston, son of the duke of Grafton, local landowners when the road was built in the 1760s
- Evelyn Yard – built by the local Evelyn family in the 18th century
- Fitzroy Court, Fitzroy Mews, Fitzroy Square and Fitzroy Street – after the Fitzroy family, dukes of Grafton, who owned much of this land
- Foley Street – after Lord Foley, local resident of the 18th-19th centuries
- Goodge Place and Goodge Street – after John Goodge, local landowner in the 18th century
- Gosfield Street – unknown
- Grafton Mews and Grafton Way – after local landowners the dukes of Grafton
- Great Castle Street – after the former nearby pub The Castle
- Great Portland Street – after the Dukes of Portland, who owned much of this land following the marriage of William Bentinck, 2nd Duke of Portland to heiress Margaret Bentinck, Duchess of Portland in 1734
- Great Titchfield Street and Little Titchfield Street – after Titchfield, Hampshire, where local landowners dukes of Portland owned land
- Greenwell Street – after the locally prominent Greenwell family
- Gresse Street – built by the Swiss local resident Peter Gaspard Gresse in the 1760s
- Hanson Street – after a nearby hospital, opening by Lord Mayor Sir Reginald Hanson in 1887
- Hanway Place and Hanway Street – after Thomas Hanway, commissioner with the navy, who owned this land in the early 18th century
- Hertford Place – after Isabella FitzRoy, Duchess of Grafton, Marchioness of Hertford, part of the local landowning Fitzroy family
- Howland Mews East and Howland Street – after Elizabeth Howland, who married Wriothesley Russell, 2nd Duke of Bedford, local landowner
- Kirkman Place – after local 18th-century brewer and property developer Joseph Kirkman
- Maple Place and Maple Street – after local Victorian-era councillor John Maple
- Margaret Court and Margaret Street – after Margaret Bentinck, Duchess of Portland, daughter of local landowner Edward Harley, 2nd Earl of Oxford and Earl Mortimer
- Market Court and Market Place – after the Oxford Market, opened here in 1732
- Marylebone Passage – from a church dedicated to St Mary, represented now by St Marylebone Parish Church (1817); the original church was built on the bank of a small stream or "bourne", called the Tybourne or Tyburn. This stream rose further north in what is now Swiss Cottage, eventually running along what is now Marylebone Lane, which preserves its curve within the grid pattern. The church and the surrounding area later became known as St Mary at the Bourne which, over time, became shortened to its present form, Marylebone.
- Middleton Place
- Mortimer Street – after Edward Harley, 2nd Earl of Oxford and Earl Mortimer, who inherited the estate via his marriage to Henrietta Harley, Countess of Oxford and Countess Mortimer in 1713
- Nassau Street – after the House of Nassau, who had local connections and married into the Georgian royal family
- New Cavendish Street – after Henry Cavendish, 2nd Duke of Newcastle-upon-Tyne, Viscount Mansfield, Baron Ogle, father-in-law of local landowner Edward Harley, 2nd Earl of Oxford and Earl Mortimer
- Newman Passage, Newman Street and Newman Yard – after Newman Hall in Quendon, Essex, owned by local property owner William Berners
- Northcourt – named in 1776 for the Prime Minister Lord North
- Ogle Street – after Henry Cavendish, 2nd Duke of Newcastle-upon-Tyne, Viscount Mansfield, Baron Ogle, father-in-law of local landowner Edward Harley, 2nd Earl of Oxford and Earl Mortimer
- Oxford Street – after Edward Harley, 2nd Earl of Oxford and Earl Mortimer who owned much of the local estate; prior to this it was known as Tyburn Road, as it led to the Tyburn gibbet at what is now Marble Arch
- Pearson Square
- Percy Mews, Percy Passage and Percy Street – after either Hugh Percy, 1st Duke of Northumberland, changing his name from ‘Smithson’ to ‘Percy’ following his marriage to Elizabeth Percy, Duchess of Northumberland, landowner or the Percy Coffee House formerly located here in the 18th century
- Queen's Yard –
- Rathbone Place and Rathbone Street – after Thomas Rathbone, local 18th-century builder
- Richardson's Mews
- Riding House Street – unknown, presumably for a local riding school; it was formerly Riding House Lane
- St Giles Circus, St Giles High Street and St Giles Passage – after St Giles Hospital, a leper hospital founded by Matilda of Scotland, wife of Henry I in 1117. St Giles was an 8th-century hermit in Provence who was crippled in a hunting accident and later became patron saint of cripples and lepers. Circus is a British term for a road junction
- Scala Street – after the Scala theatre which formerly stood here
- Stephen Mews and Stephen Street – after Stephen Lemaistre, business partner of local resident Peter Gaspard Gresse in the 1760s
- Tottenham Court Road, Tottenham Mews and Tottenham Street – after the former manor of Tottenham (Tottenhall) which stood here from the 13th century, possibly from one local William de Tottenall, or else meaning ‘Tota’s Hall’. The name later became confused with the unconnected Tottenham, Middlesex.
- Warren Mews and Warren Street – after Anne Warren, wife of local 18th-century landowner Charles Fitzroy
- Wells Mews and Wells Street – after Joseph (or George) Wells, local 17th-century farmer
- Whitfield Place and Whitfield Street – after George Whitefield, prominent 18th-century religious figure, who founded a tabernacle near here in 1756
- Windmill Street – after the windmill that formerly stood near here in the 18th century
- Winsley Street – unknown
