= Margaret Street =

Margaret Street may be:

- Margaret Street, Brisbane, Australia
- Margaret Street, Birmingham, United Kingdom
- Margaret Street, London, United Kingdom

== See also ==
- Margaret Street Chapel, London, United Kingdom
