= Pitt Street (disambiguation) =

Pitt Street may refer to:

- Pitt Street, Sydney, Australia
- Pitt Street, Hong Kong
- Pitt Street (Manhattan), New York City, USA
- Pitt Street, George Town, Penang, Malaysia
- Pitt Street, Singapore
- Pitt Street, Glasgow
- Pitt Street, London
