= William Upton Richards =

The Reverend William Upton Richards
- Born: 2 March 1811; Penryn, England
- Died: 16 June 1873 (aged 62); London, England
- Education: Exeter College, Oxford
- Spouse: Caroline Cazalet (m. 1835)
- Religion: Christianity (Anglican)
- Church: Church of England
- Ordained: 1837
- Congregations served: All Saints, Margaret Street, London

William Upton Richards (1811–1873) was an English Anglican priest. He was a prominent Tractarian in the Church of England who served mostly notably as the vicar of All Saints, Margaret Street, London, from 1859 to 1873.

Richards was born 2 March 1811 in Penryn, Cornwall, to William Richards and Elizabeth Rose Thomas. He matriculated from Exeter College, Oxford, in 1829, graduating with a Bachelor of Arts degree in 1833. He was promoted to Master of Arts in 1839. On 22 August 1835 he married Caroline Cazalet at All Souls, St Marylebone, London.

Richards was ordained in the Church of England in 1837. Circa 1848–1851, he supported Harriet Brownlow Byron in the foundation of the Society of All Saints Sisters of the Poor, one of the first Anglican orders for women, at Margaret Street, London; the sisters were employed in nursing the poor and destitute in the parish. He died 16 June 1873 in his home in Regent's Park, London.

== See also ==
- Edward Bouverie Pusey
