= Audley House =

Audley House may be one of several houses and buildings in England:

- Audley House, London, England
- Audley End House, Saffron Waldon, Essex, England
- A Grade I listed building in Salisbury, England
- A Victorian mansion in Prospect, South Australia
