= London Cathedral =

London Cathedral may refer to one of the following cathedrals in London, England:

== Anglican ==
- St Paul's Cathedral, Anglican cathedral for the Diocese of London
  - Old St Paul's Cathedral, former cathedral on the site of the present St Paul's Cathedral
- Southwark Cathedral, Anglican cathedral for the Diocese of Southwark
- Westminster Abbey, Anglican church and former cathedral in the City of Westminster, London

== Other denominations ==
- Dormition Cathedral, London, Russian Orthodox cathedral
- St George's Cathedral, London, Antiochian Orthodox cathedral
- Saint Sophia Cathedral, London, Greek Orthodox cathedral
- Westminster Cathedral, Roman Catholic cathedral in the City of Westminster, London

== See also ==
- St. Paul's Cathedral (London, Ontario), Canada
