= London Fo Guang Shan Temple =

Buddhist temple in London

Coordinates: 51.5171°N 0.1382°W

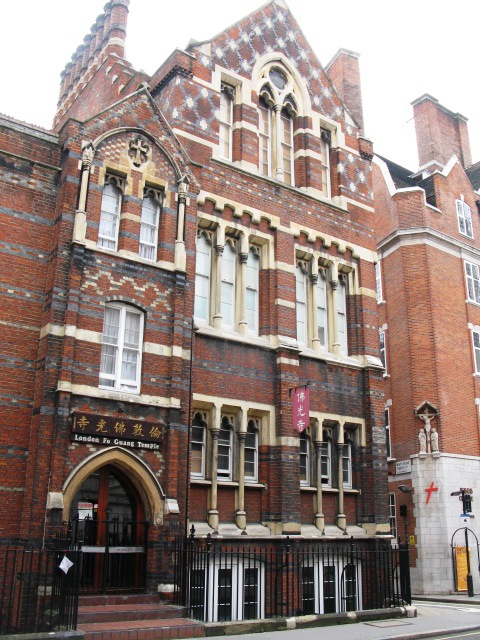
London Fo Guang Shan Temple

The London Fo Guang Shan Temple is located at 84 Margaret Street, London W1, England. It was established in 1992 and is also known as International Buddhist Progress Society. It is one of two British branches of Fo Guang Shan Order, Taiwan.

The temple is located in a former parish school and Church House of 1868–1870 designed by William Butterfield. The building is grade II* listed.
