= William Winlaw =

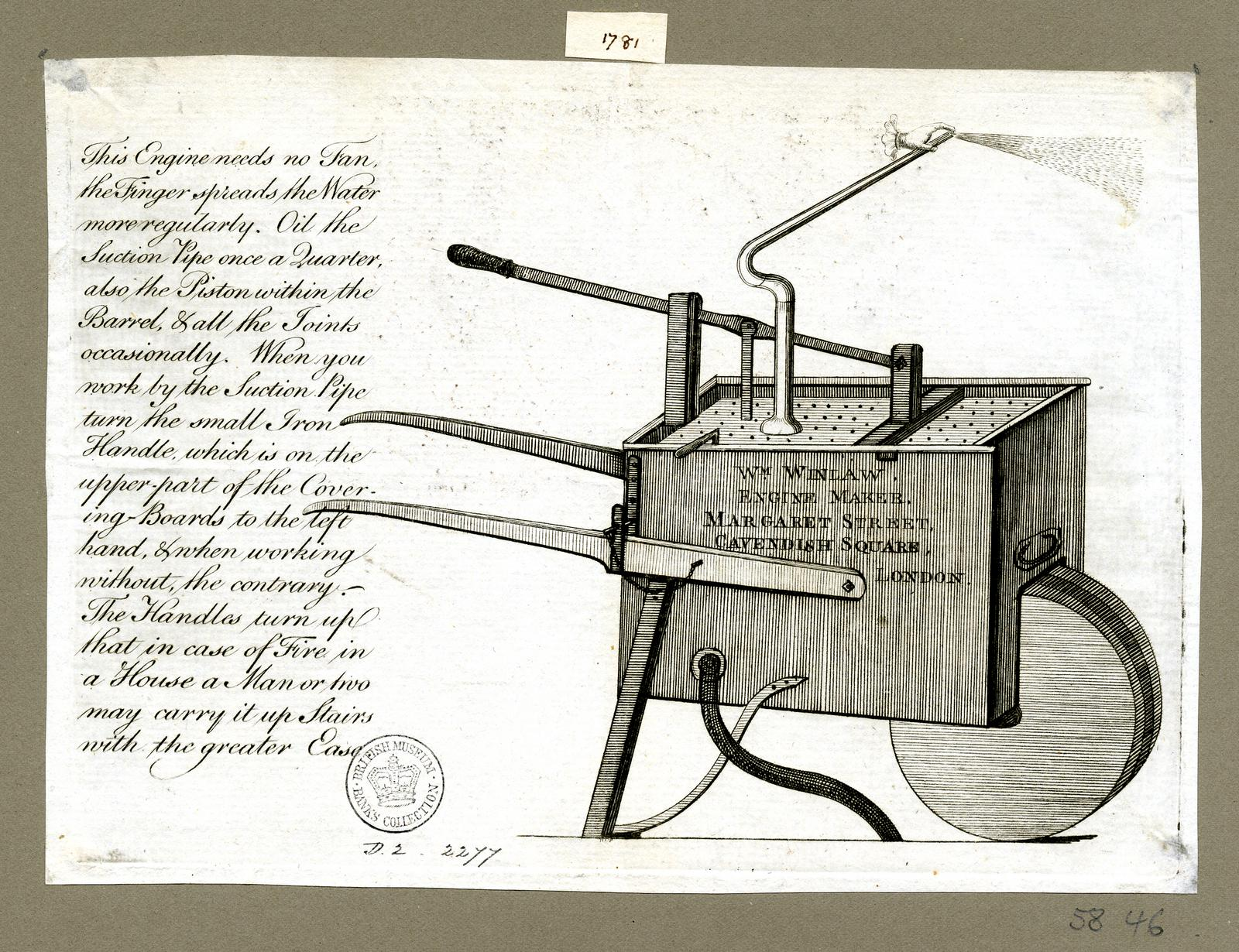
Trade card of William Winlaw in the collection of the British Museum

William Winlaw was an 18th-century English agricultural machinery inventor and manufacturer with a factory in Margaret Street, Cavendish Square, London.

Winlaw produced machine equipment and implements used in agriculture and husbandry. He invented and patented many new machines and pieces of equipment in the late 18th century. Examples include:

- A mill for separating grain from corn
- A spring and index fixed to a whippletree
- A syringe for watering plants or flowers

At the time of his death in 1796, William Winlaw was described as the "Engine-maker to the Prince of Wales and Duke of Clarence", namely Prince George (1762–1830), later King George IV, and Duke William (1765–1837), later King William IV. Winlaw's Will is held by the National Archives in the United Kingdom.

== Machinery by William Winlaw ==
The following are some machines and implements used in agriculture and husbandry, made by William Winlaw:

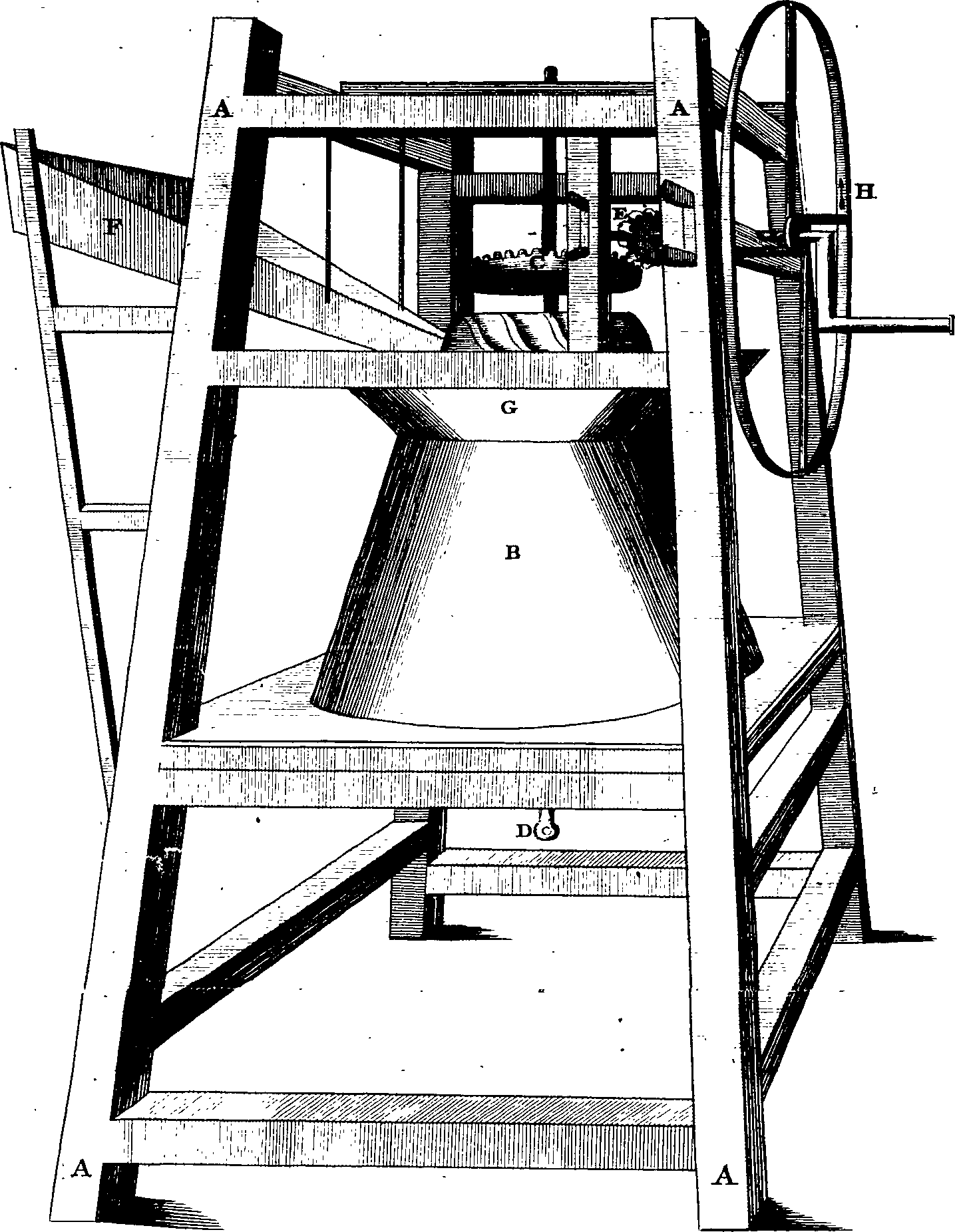

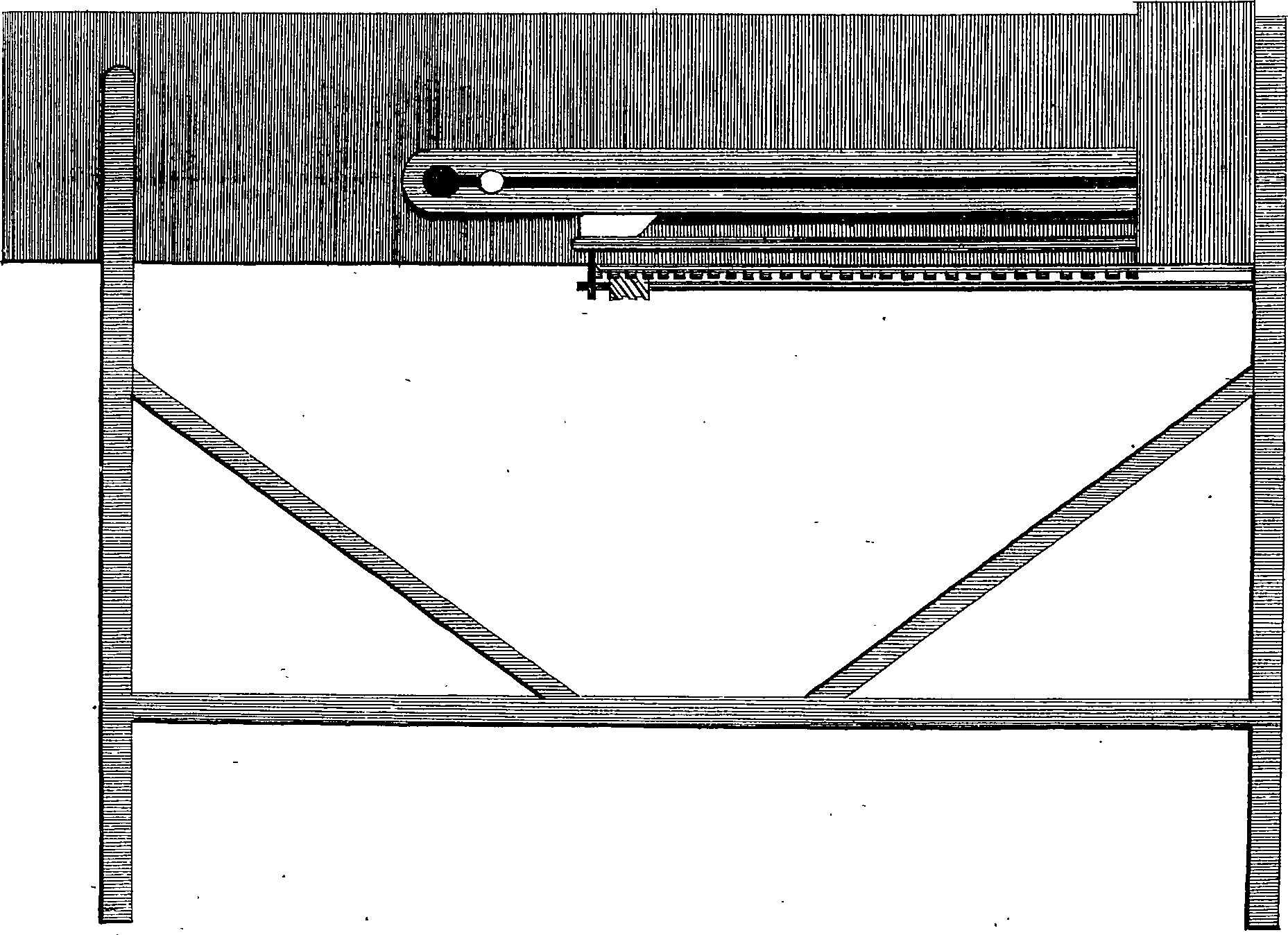

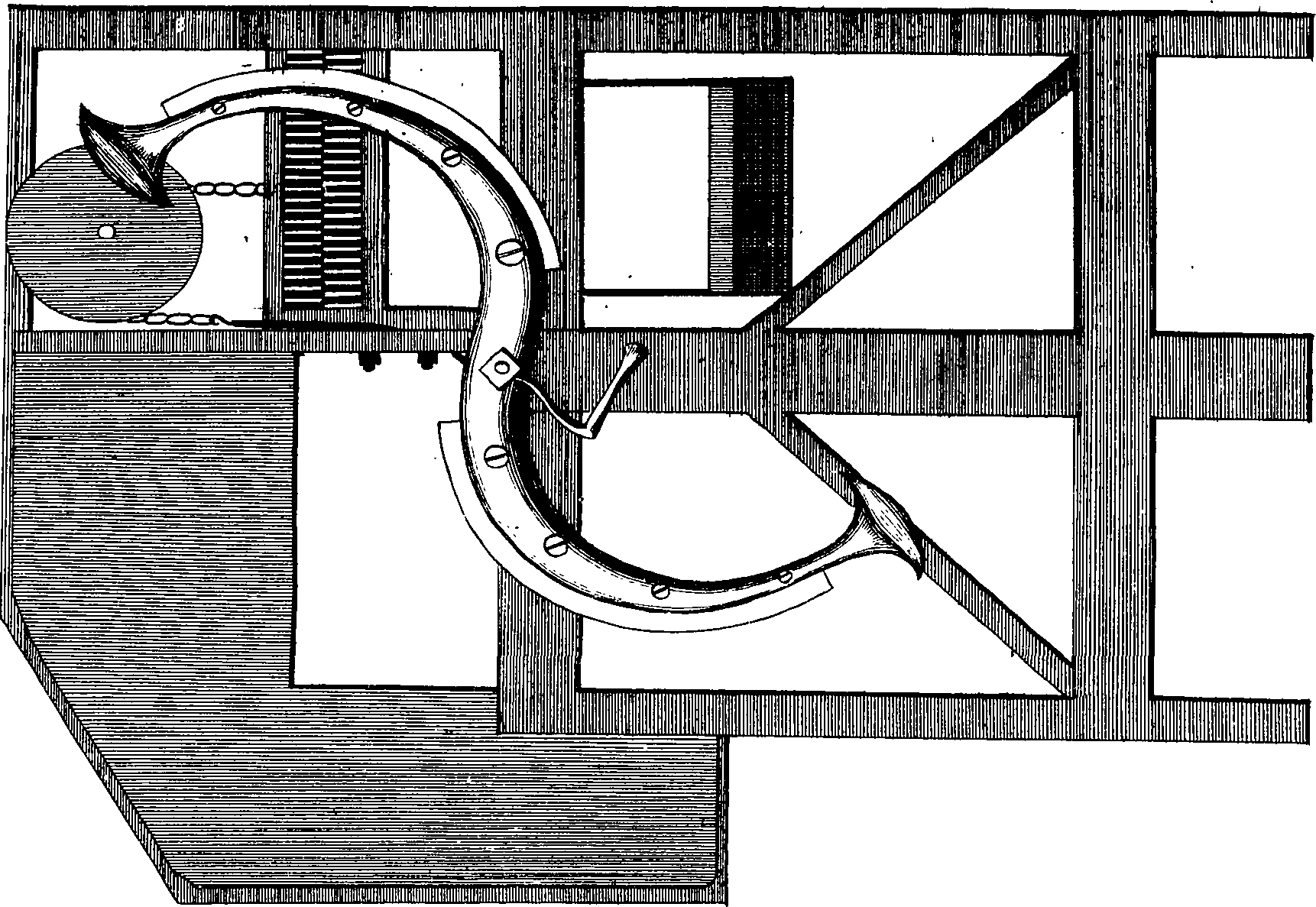

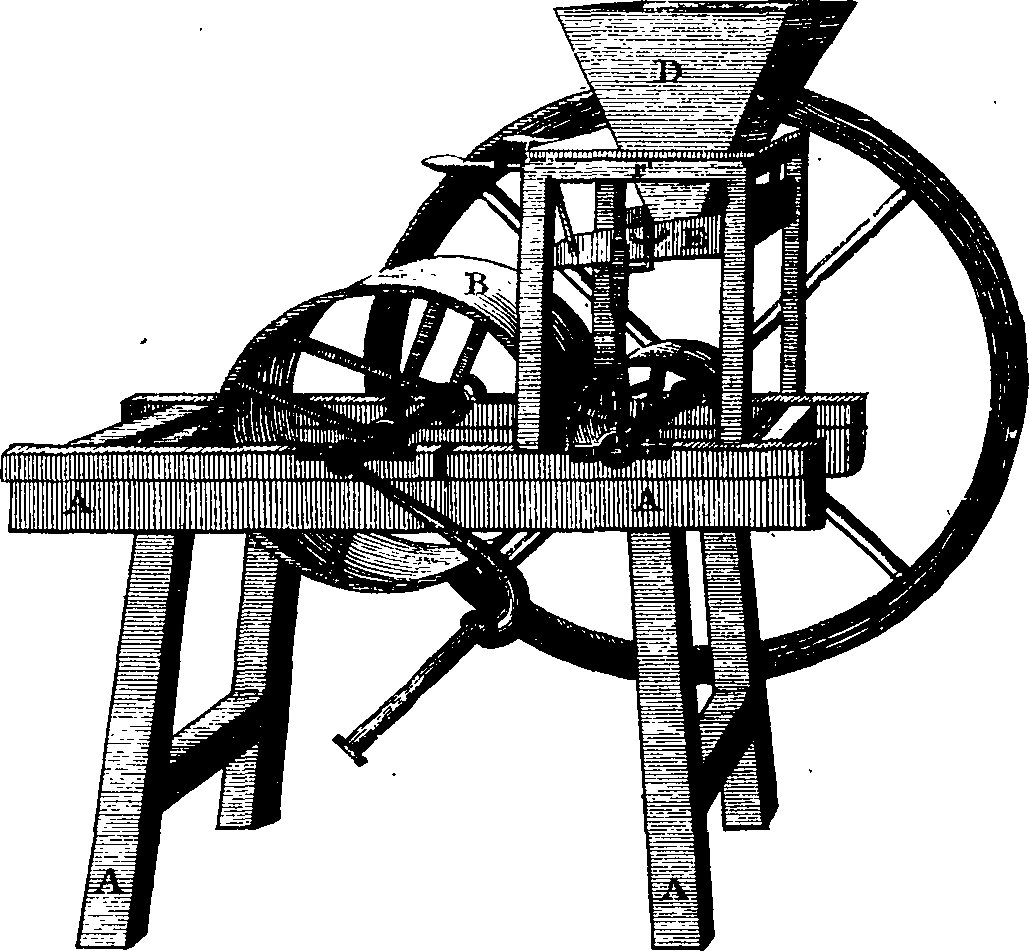

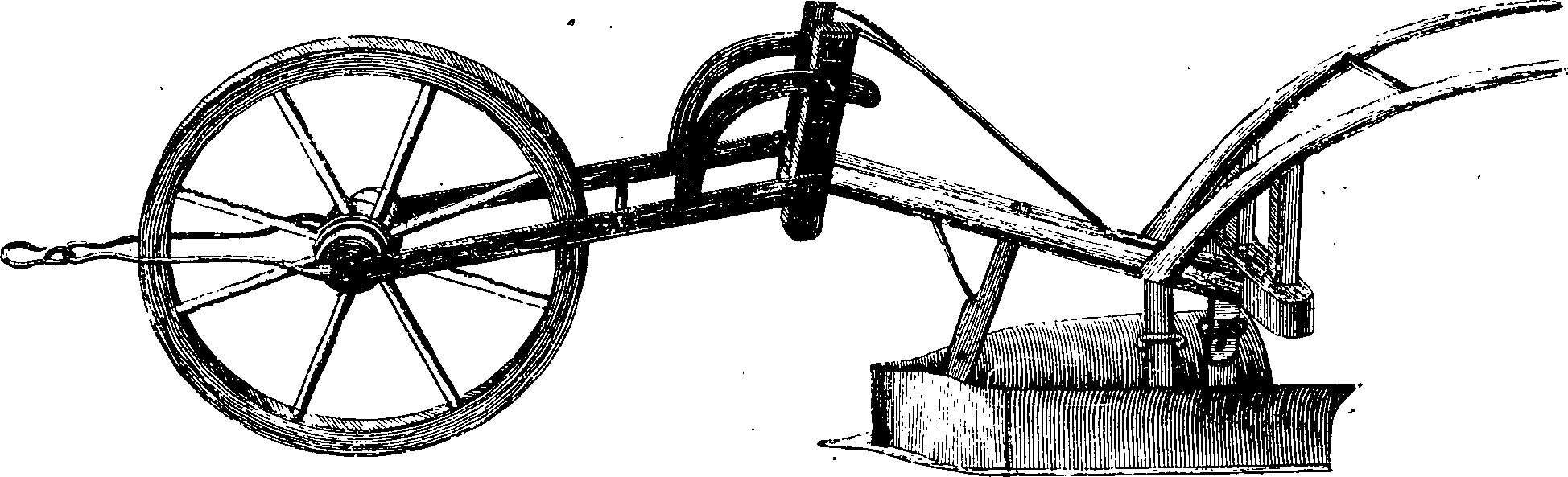
