= William Dodsworth =

English cleric

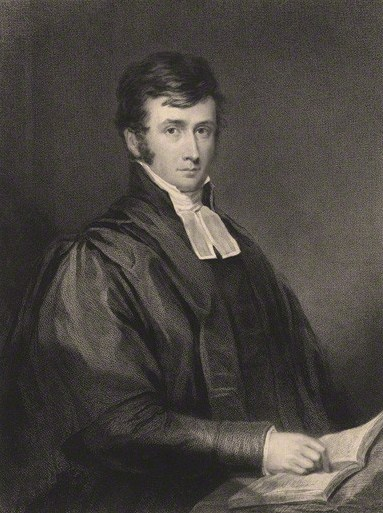
William Dodsworth, 1835 engraving

William Dodsworth (1798–1861) was an English cleric of the Church of England, a Tractarian who became a Roman Catholic lay writer.

== Life ==
Dodsworth received his education at Trinity College, Cambridge, where he was admitted in October 1815. He graduated B.A. in 1820, and M.A. in 1823. He took orders in the Church of England, and at first held evangelical views.

Dodsworth became in 1829 minister of Margaret Street Chapel, Cavendish Square, London, where he was a popular preacher. By about 1835 he identified with the Tractarians. In 1837 he was appointed perpetual curate of Christ Church, St. Pancras, London. After the judgment in the Gorham case, he resigned his preferment, and joined the Roman Catholic church in January 1851.

Being married, Dodsworth could not take orders as a Catholic priest. After his conversion he led a quiet life as a layman of that community. He died in York Terrace, Regent's Park, on 10 December 1861, leaving several children by his wife Elizabeth, youngest sister of Lord Churston.

== Works ==
Among Dodsworth's works were:

- Advent Lectures, London 1837.
- A few Comments on Dr. Pusey's Letter to the Bishop of London, London (three editions), 1851.
- Further Comments on Dr. Pusey's renewed Explanation, London 1851.
- Anglicanism considered in its results, London 1851.
- Popular Delusions concerning the Faith and Practice of Catholics, London 1857.
- Popular Objections to Catholic Faith and Practice considered, London 1858.

== Notes ==
Attribution

This article incorporates text from a publication now in the public domain: Stephen, Leslie, ed. (1888). "Dodsworth, William". Dictionary of National Biography. Vol. 15. London: Smith, Elder & Co.
