= All Saints, Margaret Street =

Church in London, England

Coordinates: 51°31′02.10″N 00°08′20.64″W

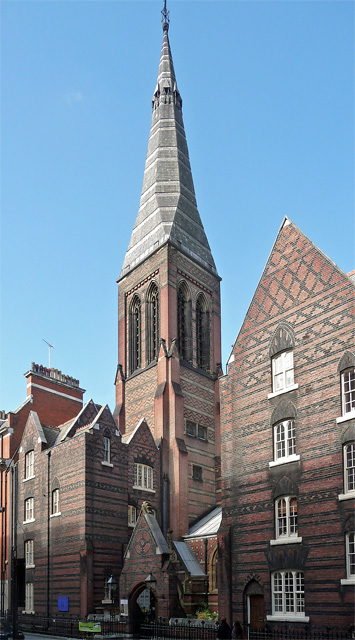
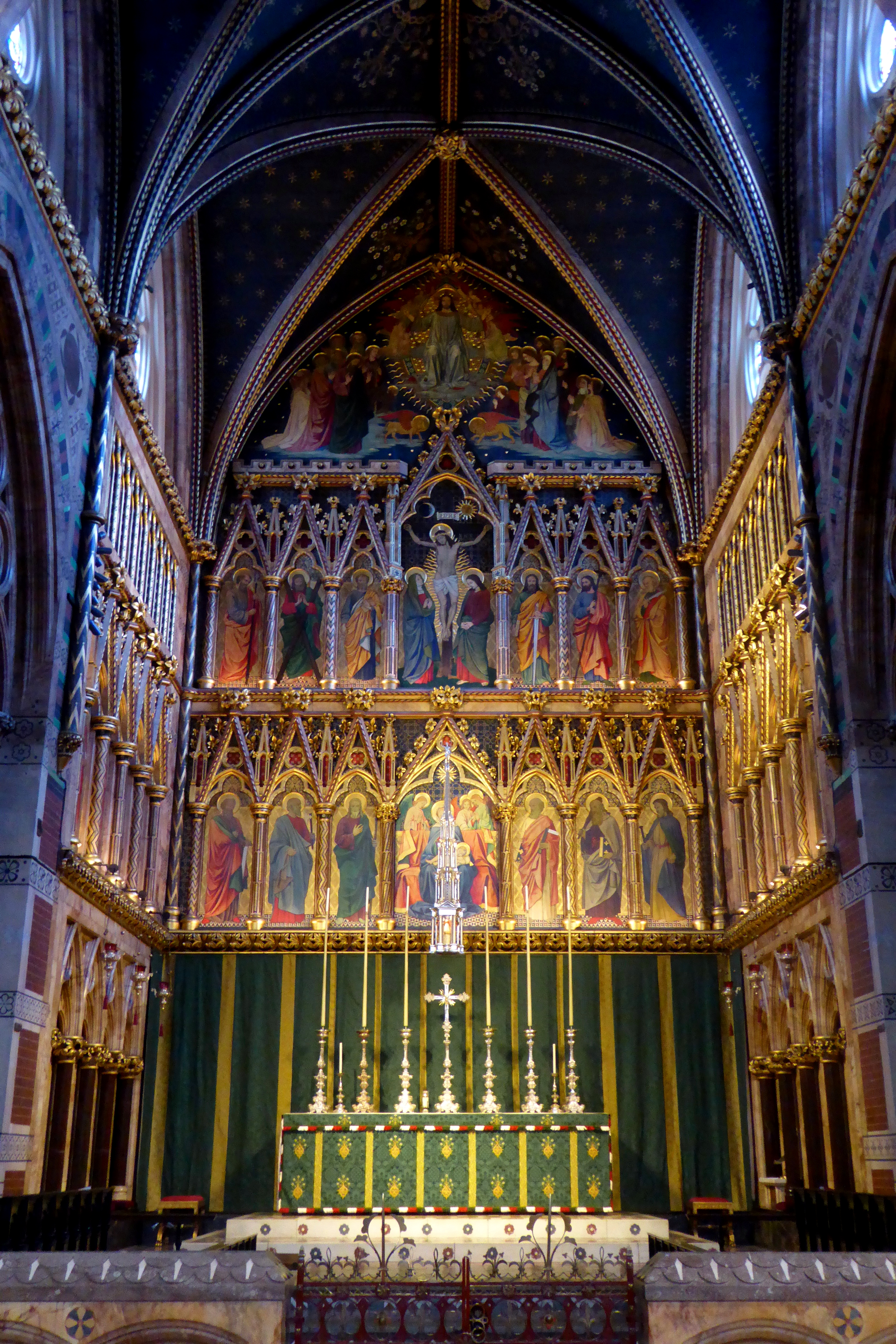
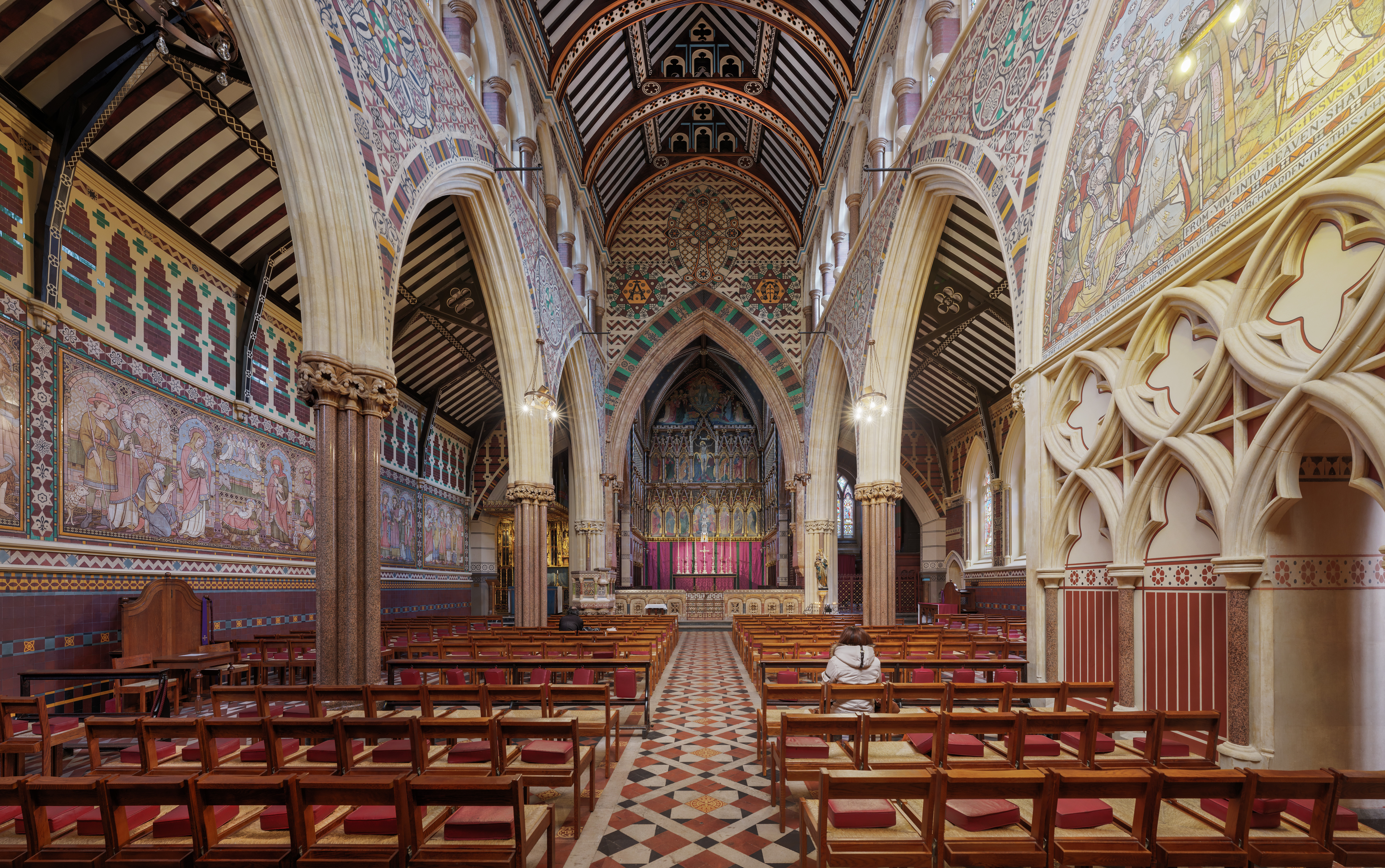
- Clockwise from upper left: the exterior of All Saints; the chancel and the high altar; a panorama of the interior.
- All Saints, Margaret Street
- Denomination: Church of England
- Churchmanship: Anglo-Catholic
- Website: asms.uk

History
- Consecrated: 1859

Architecture
- Heritage designation: Grade I
- Architect: William Butterfield
- Style: Gothic Revival

Administration
- Province: Canterbury
- Diocese: London

Clergy
- Bishop: Rt Revd Jonathan Baker (AEO)
- Vicar: Fr Peter Anthony

All Saints (Note: Sometimes written as All Saints'.) is an Anglo-Catholic church on Margaret Street in Westminster, Greater London, England. Founded in the late 18th century as Margaret Street Chapel, the church became one aligned with the Oxford Movement in the 1830s and 1840s. The Movement also prompted the reconstruction of the church in the 1850s under the architect William Butterfield, and the establishment of the Society of All Saints Sisters of the Poor, affiliated to the church. As a parish which does not affirm the ordination of women to the priesthood or episcopacy, All Saints is under the oversight of the Bishop of Fulham.

The church building has been hailed as Butterfield's masterpiece and a pioneering building of the High Victorian Gothic style that would characterize British architecture from around 1850 to 1870. It is known for its Gothic design, use of materials, and interior decoration. The church's musical tradition traces back to the 1840s.

== History ==
=== Margaret Street Chapel ===
According to the Survey of London, Margaret Street Chapel was founded by William Cudworth, who used to be Methodist but later became antinomian. The chapel was built in 1752 and leased to Cudworth in 1754, and there was a nonconformist congregation by 1757. In 1776, the deist David Williams rented the chapel to promote a "universalist liturgy". In the 1780s the chapel was closed before it became a proprietary chapel in the Church of England and its ownership came under the Crown. J. D. Hazlewood was the minister of the chapel for a period of time after its reopening. According to Galloway and Rawll, the chapel looked like an 18th century meeting house of English Dissenters and did not possess architectural significance.

The chapel was damaged in the Titchfield Street fire of 1825. In 1827 the English banker and politician Henry Drummond purchased the site and the building, hoping to promote Irvingism within the Church of England. He also appointed William Dodsworth to be the minister of Margaret Street Chapel in 1829.

=== Oxford Movement ===
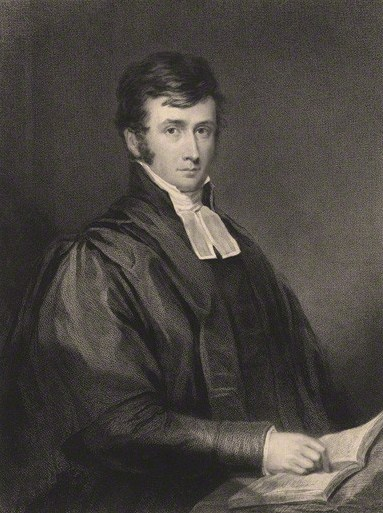
William Dodsworth (1798–1861), minister of Margaret Street Chapel from 1829 to 1837, introduced the Oxford Movement there.

William Dodsworth became an early follower of the Oxford Movement, a 19th-century religious movement in the Church of England that sought a return to Catholic thoughts and practices. It was preceded by an 1820s intellectual revival at Oxford, in particular the Noetics of Oriel College, and its key leaders were John Henry Newman, Richard Hurrell Froude, John Keble, and Edward Bouverie Pusey. The Movement's ideas are manifest in the Tracts for the Times, and its adherents were often called "Tractarians". Among its ideas, the Tracts emphasised apostolic succession and the episcopacy, defended the practice of liturgy, and underscored the importance of the eucharist, advocating for its more frequent celebration. Anglo-Catholicism stemmed from the Movement.

Dodsworth introduced many ideas of the Oxford Movement to Margaret Street Chapel. He was a popular preacher, and the chapel attracted many London Tractarian supporters. Dodsworth later left Margaret Street Chapel in 1837 to join Christ Church, Albany Street and was succeeded by Charles Thornton. Thornton, a cousin of Edward Bouverie Pusey, was also a member of the Oxford Movement. He translated a volume within the Library of the Fathers, a collection of English translations of the works of the Church Fathers, but died in June 1839 before its publication.

Frederick Oakeley, a fellow of Balliol College, Oxford who joined the Oxford Movement in early 1839, left the university and became minister of Margaret Street Chapel on 5 July that year. As minister, Oakeley rearranged the interior of the chapel and practised Anglo-Catholic high liturgy, making it a "showcase of the liturgical practices of the Oxford movement" according to Galloway and Rawll. James Pereiro also wrote that the chapel was an example of the "new spirit of liturgical worship" of Oxford. In 1845, Oakeley wrote a letter to Charles James Blomfield, Bishop of London, asserting his right to uphold all Roman doctrine. Facing opposition from the bishop, Oakeley gave up his minister licence on 3 June and joined the Roman Catholic Church on 29 October that year. He was succeeded by William Upton Richards, assistant minister of the chapel. (Note: The last name of William is "Upton Richards".)

Members of the Oxford Movement were concerned with the liturgical use of architecture. During his tenure, Oakeley envisioned rebuilding the chapel according to a proper ecclesiastical style and raised about £3,000. His successor Upton Richards continued the project of rebuilding the chapel. Meanwhile, the Cambridge Camden Society, a society studying Gothic architecture, was seeking to build a church that would embody their architectural ideal and provide orthodox liturgy at the same time. In 1845, Alexander Beresford Hope, a leader of the society, realised that the chapel rebuilding scheme could be combined with the society's goal. His proposal received the approval of Richards and Bishop Blomfield. Upton Richards purchased the sites of the chapel and adjoining houses in 1849 in order to build a new church, and the Ecclesiastical District of All Saints' was soon founded on 30 July 1849. (Note: According to Galloway and Rawll, Upton Richards further collected £9,000 for the purchase. Charles Eastlake wrote in 1872 that the total cost for the grounds was £14,500.)

The Cambridge Camden Society took charge of the rebuilding and appointed Sir Stephen Glynne and Beresford Hope overseeing the work. Glynne, however, did not participate in the project, and Hope took sole charge. William Butterfield was selected as the architect. Margaret Street Chapel saw its last sermon preached by Charles Marriott on 7 April 1850 and held its final service the next day. Edward Bouverie Pusey laid the foundation stone of the new church on All Saints' Day, 1850. During the construction of the new church, the congregation worshipped in Great Titchfield Street and, after 1855, at 77a Margaret Street. The total cost of the church, including the site and endowments, was around £70,000; several large individual donations helped to fund it.

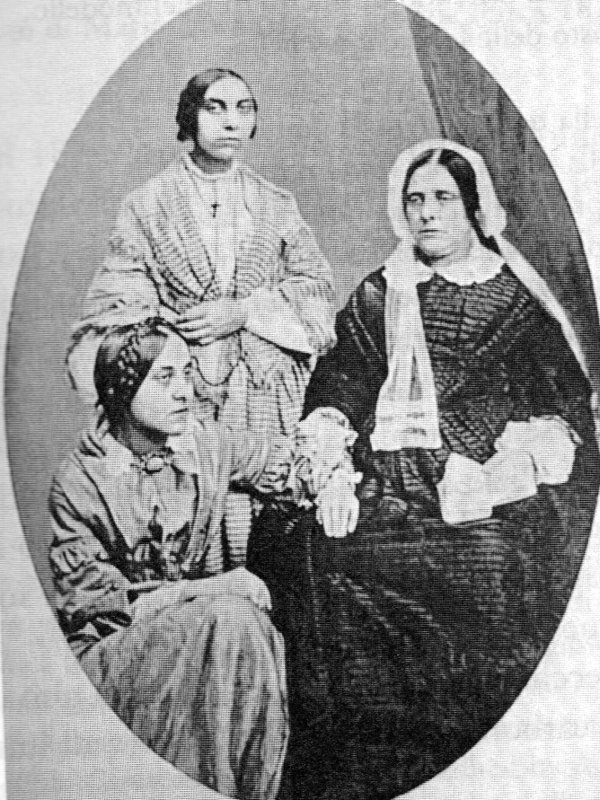
Frances Polidori (right) and her two daughters, Maria (left, standing) and Christina Rossetti (left, sitting), in 1855. The following year Maria joined the All Saints Sisters. Christina also worked for the society in the 1860s.

The Oxford Movement also led to the creation of religious orders for women in England, including one at Margaret Street Chapel. Upton Richards encountered Harriet Brownlow Byron in 1848 and encouraged her to live a religious life. Brown later moved to 67 Mortimer Street and created a community for people with disabilities and orphaned children. Upton Richards celebrated Eucharist for the community in 1851, and in 1856 they moved to Margaret Street, across from the new church building. On 5 May 1856 Upton Richards received the professions of religious sisterhood of Byron and two other women, and in August they founded the Society of All Saints (Sisters of the Poor). Byron was installed as the Superior of the society by Samuel Wilberforce, Bishop of Oxford. Maria, Christina Rossetti's older sister, joined the society as an associate sister in 1856. Christina had associations with the society later in her life, working at the society's House of Charity in Highgate in the 1860s. The scholar Elizabeth Ludlow argued that Rossetti's poem "Yet a Little While" contains phrases that describe the interior of All Saints, Margaret Street.

=== All Saints, Margaret Street ===
On 28 May 1859, Bishop of London Archibald Campbell Tait consecrated the church building of All Saints. Upton Richards served actively for ten years until he suffered strokes in 1869. The Survey of London describes the congregation at the time "occasional in character", as parishioners were not assigned fixed seats. In 1860 Upton Richards also established a choir school on Margaret Street for the church. He remained the vicar of All Saints until his death on 16 June 1873 and was succeeded by Berdmore Compton succeeded on 28 October. To commemorate Upton Richards, the parish devoted the decoration of the north wall of the church, which was designed by Butterfield, painted by Alexander Gibbs, and made by Henry Poole & Sons in 1875–1876.

Compton's tenure lasted until July 1886, during which Archbishop of Canterbury Edward White Benson preached at the church on Ascension Day, 3 June 1886. William Allen Whitworth became vicar in November that year. He created a newspaper for the parish in 1887, established a mission in Pentonville in northern London from 1888 to 1897, and offered Welsh services at All Saints from 1889 to 1895. Whitworth died after a bowel operation in March 1905. During the Victorian era, Princess Alexandra of Denmark frequented the church until the death of her son Prince Albert Victor in 1892. She sometimes brought her husband, the future Edward VII, and her family.

George Holden led the church from 1905 to his death in 1908, re-establishing a ward of the Confraternity of the Blessed Sacrament there in 1906 and joining the church to the English Church Union in 1907. He was succeeded by Henry Mackay, the fifth vicar of All Saints from 1908 to 1934. H. F. B. Mackay elevated the liturgy at the church by introducing incense in 1908 and paschal candles in 1912. He renamed the services as "Mass" in 1911 and the Solemn Eucharist "High Mass" in 1913, and from 1915 priests were addressed as "Fathers". The Anglican Benedictine monk Dom Bernard Clements succeeded Mackay in 1934. In 1939 he oversaw the celebrations of the centenary of the licensing of Frederick Oakeley to Margaret Street Chapel, with preachers including the Archbishops of York and of Wales, and in November that year the Archbishop of Canterbury Cosmo Gordon Lang preached at evensong at All Saints.

During the bombing of London in the Second World War, the choristers were sent to the countryside and the roof of the parish school was set on fire. Dom Bernard died in 1942, and Geoffrey Fisher, then the Bishop of London, appointed Cyril Edric Tomkinson as the new vicar in 1943, who resigned due to ill health in 1951 and was succeeded by Kenneth Needham Ross. In 1959 All Saints celebrated the centenary of its consecration, having the Archbishop of York preaching at the High Mass on 31 May. In 1967 the choir school was closed due to financial difficulties and Ross retired two years later.

The ninth vicar, Michael Marshall, led the church from 1969 to 1975. In 1970, Bishop Graham Leonard of London thought of using All Saints as a centre to catechise lay people, which inspired Marshall to establish the Institute of Christian Studies at 84 Margaret Street, where the choir school once occupied. For the first three years the institute was a resident community, before it transitioned into a place of teaching and was formally opened by Michael Ramsey, Archbishop of Canterbury, in 1973. The institute closed around 1978. Marshall was elected and consecrated Bishop of Woolwich in 1975, and the next vicar was David Sparrow, who held the post from 1976 to his death in 1981.

David Hope, then principal of St Stephen's House, Oxford, an Anglo-Catholic theological college, was appointed the vicar of All Saints in 1982. In 1983 he organised a celebration of the 150th anniversary of the Oxford Movement, which saw Michael Ramsey, Archbishop of Canterbury, preaching at Evensong. In the same year Hope reinstated the celebration of the Feast of the Assumption and introduced the use of a monstrance for Benediction. During his tenure, he also established the Tenebrae service during the Holy Week. Hope became the Bishop of Wakefield in 1985, and was succeeded as the vicar of All Saints by David Hutt in 1986.

Alan Moses was the vicar in the early 21st century. The current incumbent is Peter Anthony. In 2020 the church came under the episcopal oversight of the Bishop of Fulham.

== Architecture ==
Interior of the church facing east

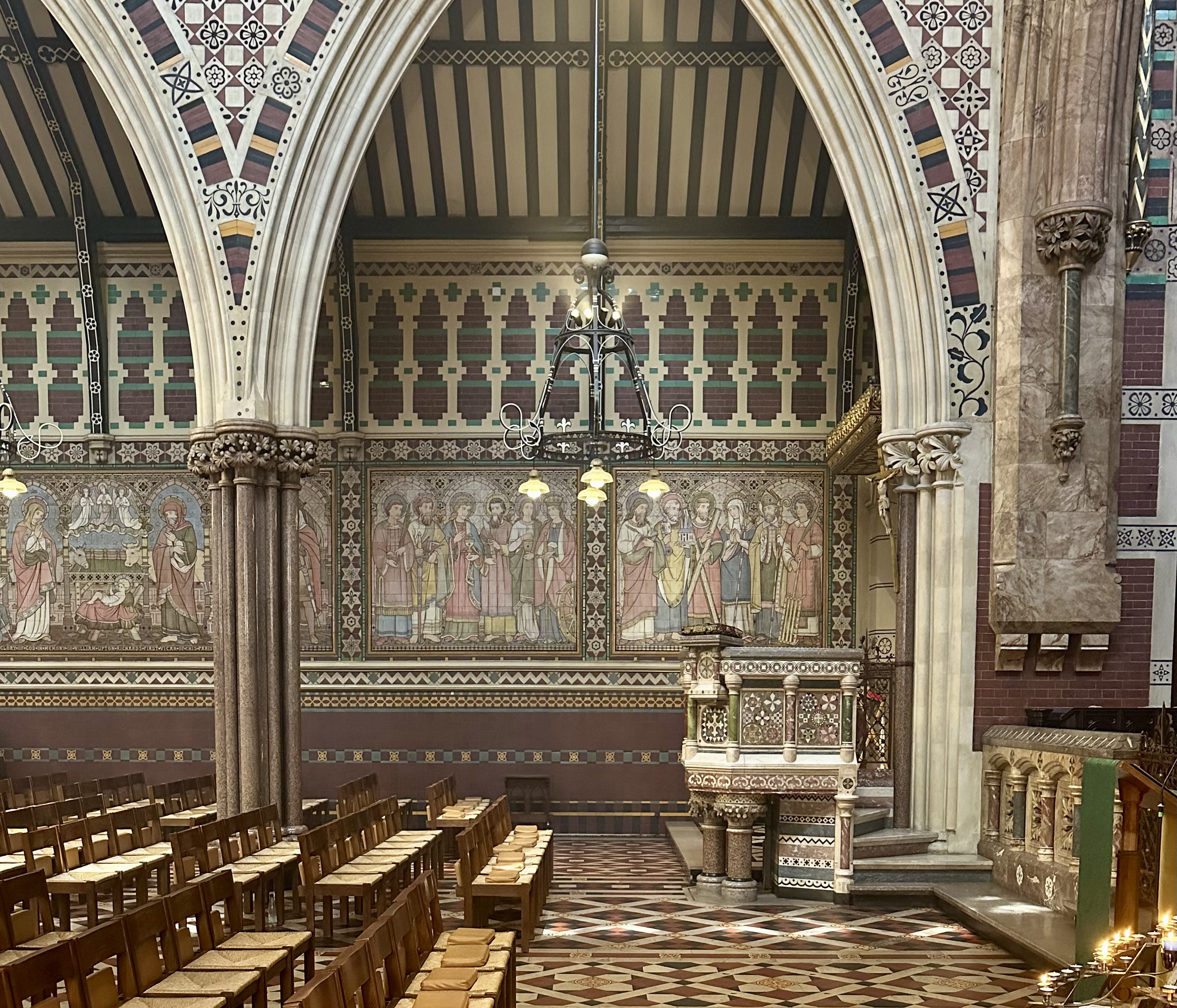
North wall and pulpit

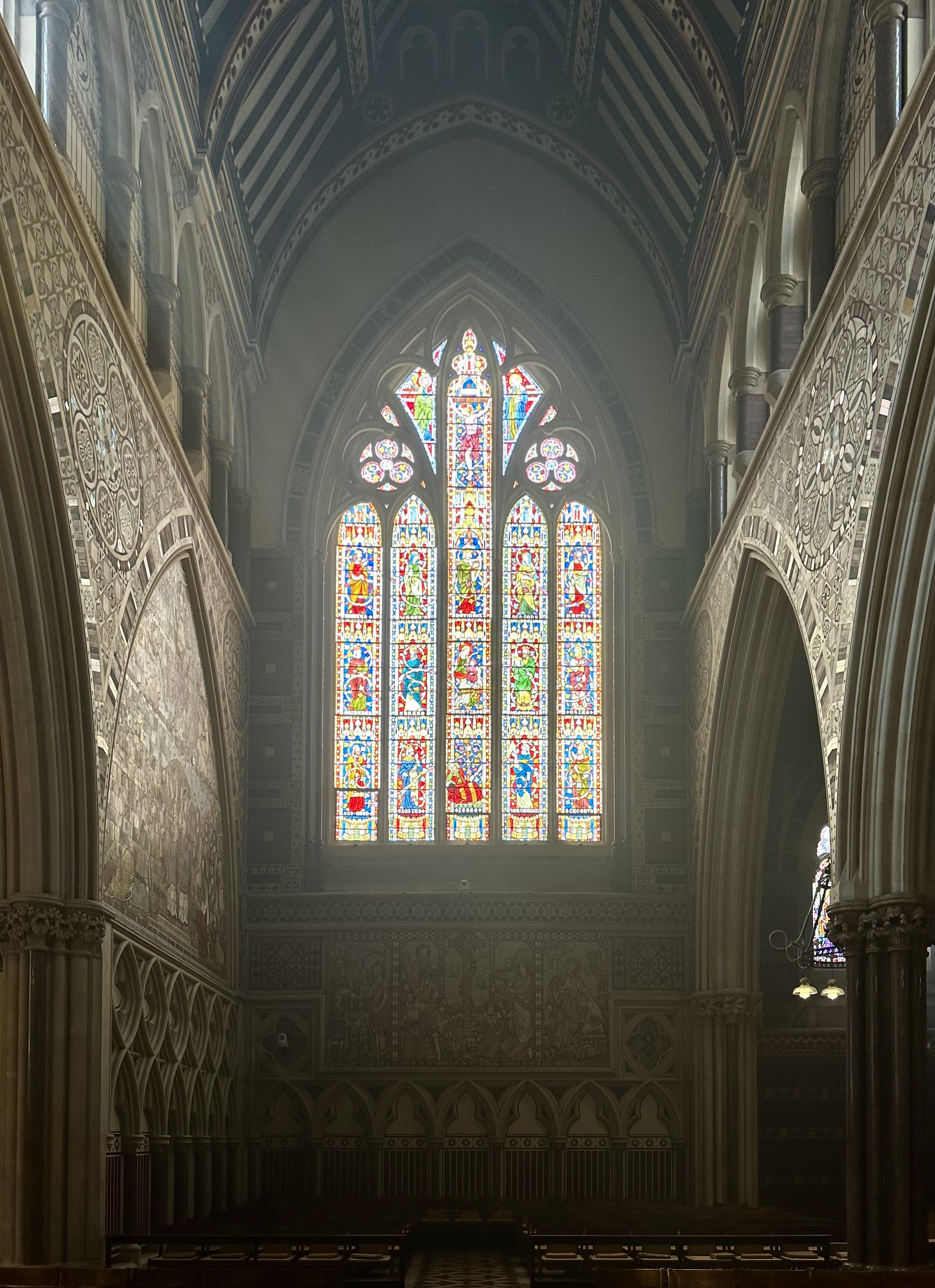
West window and the west end of the nave

All Saints marked a new stage in the development of the Gothic Revival in English architecture. The author and columnist Simon Jenkins called All Saints "architecturally England's most celebrated Victorian church", and the architectural historian Simon Thurley listed All Saints among the ten most important buildings in the country.

The design of the church showed Butterfield (in Sir John Betjeman's words) "going on from where the Middle Ages left off" as a neo-Gothic architect. Previous architecture of the 19th-century Gothic Revival had copied medieval buildings. But Butterfield departed considerably from medieval Gothic practice, especially by using new materials like brick. Charles Locke Eastlake, the 19th-century architect and writer, wrote that Butterfield's design was "a bold and magnificent endeavour to shake off the trammels of antiquarian precedent, which had long fettered the progress of the Revival, to create not a new style, but a development of previous styles". The Victorian critic John Ruskin wrote after seeing All Saints: "Having done this, we may do anything; ... and I believe it to be possible for us, not only to equal, but far to surpass, in some respects, any Gothic yet seen in Northern countries."

Butterfield's use of building materials was innovative. All Saints is built of brick, in contrast to Gothic Revival churches of the 1840s, typically built of grey Kentish ragstone. At All Saints, Butterfield felt a mission to "give dignity to brick", and the quality of the brick he chose made it more expensive than stone. The exterior of All Saints employs red brick, heavily banded and patterned with black brick, with bands of stone and carved elements in the gate, the church wall and spire. Decoration is therefore built into the structure, making All Saints the first example of 'structural polychromy' in London.

All Saints is particularly celebrated for its interior decoration. Every surface is richly patterned or decorated; the floor in diaper patterned tiles, wall surfaces in geometrical patterned brick, tile, and marble, as well as tiles with painted decoration, large friezes executed in painted tiles, a painted ceiling, and painted and gilded timberwork behind the altar. The architectural historian Nikolaus Pevsner described the interior as "dazzling, though in an eminently High Victorian ostentatiousness or obtrusiveness. ... No part of the walls is left undecorated. From everywhere the praise of the Lord is drummed into you."

The rear of the chancel features a series of paintings on gilded boards, within a delicately carved brightly patterned gothic screen, the work of Ninian Comper and a restoration of earlier work by William Dyce. The decoration of the Lady Chapel is also by Comper. The north wall is dominated by a large ceramic tile frieze designed by Butterfield, painted by Alexander Gibbs, and fired by Henry Poole and Sons, installed in 1873. It depicts a variety of scenes from the Old Testament, a central Nativity scene and depictions of Early Church Fathers.

The stained-glass windows are limited in All Saints due to the density of buildings around the church. The original windows were designed by Alfred Gérente (1821–1868) but his work was not held in high regard and was subsequently replaced. The large west window, which was originally fitted with glass by Gerente in 1853–58, was replaced in 1877 with a design by Alexander Gibbs based on the Tree of Jesse window in Wells Cathedral. The glass in the clerestory dates from 1853 and is the work of Michael O'Connor, who also designed the east window of the south chancel aisle which depicts Christ in Majesty with St Edward Martyr and St Augustine.

The baptistery in the south-west corner of the church is noted for its marble tiling which features an image of the Pelican in her Piety in the ceiling tiles, a symbol of the fall and redemption of man.

The reredos, by Butterfield, was moved to St Catherine's Church, Wickford, at some time during the 20th century.

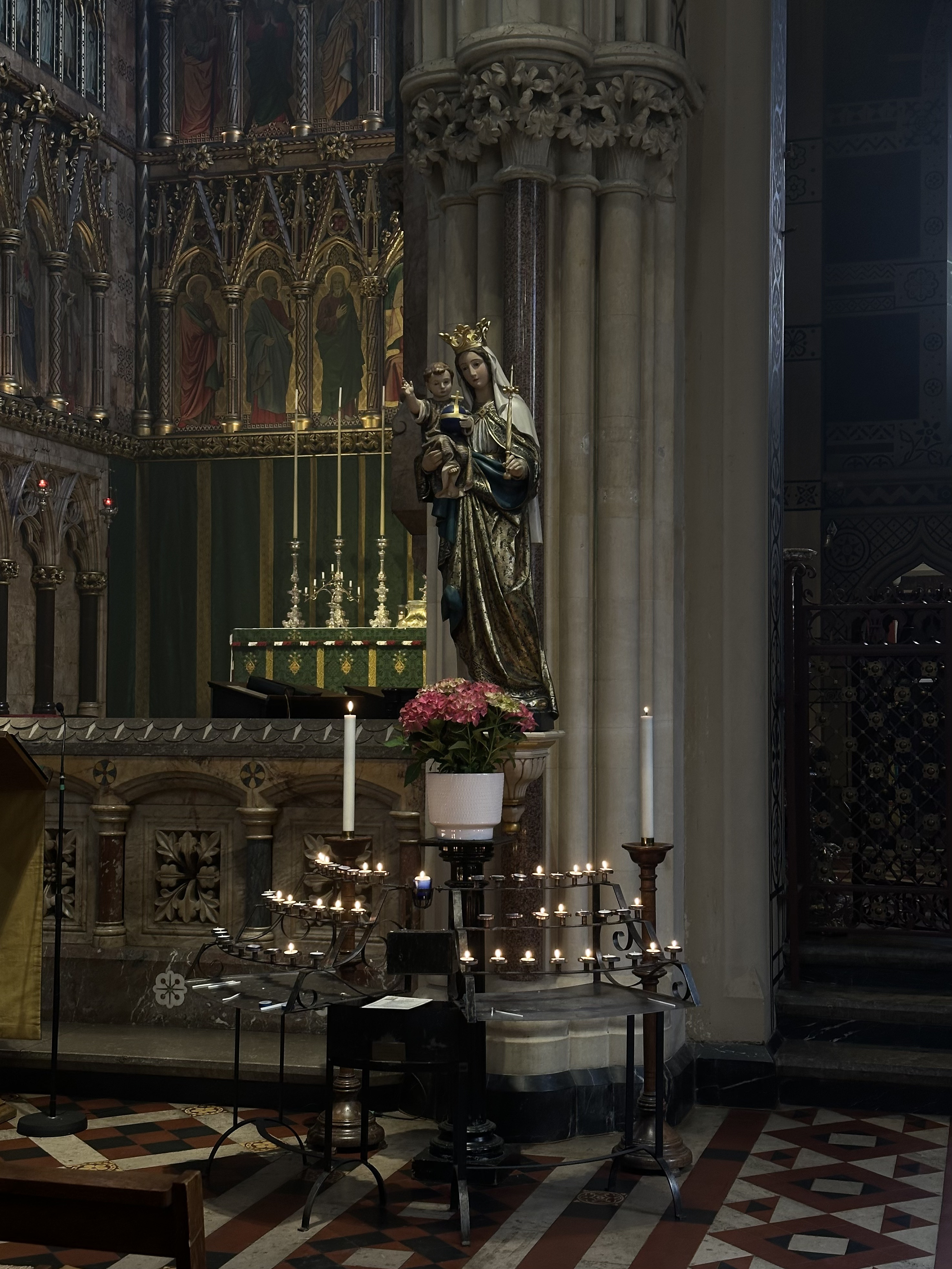
Statue of the Blessed Virgin Mary near the chancel

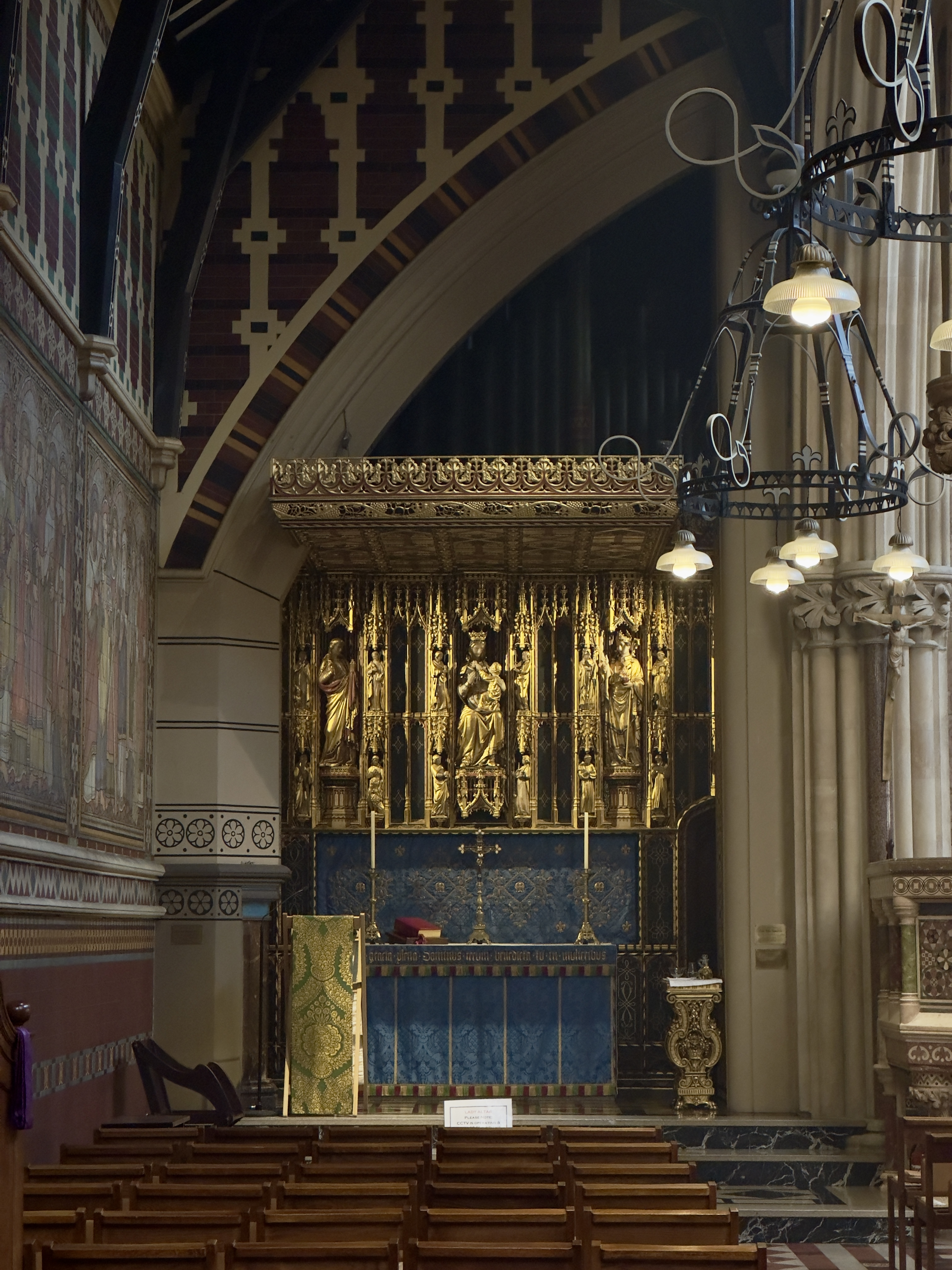
Lady chapel

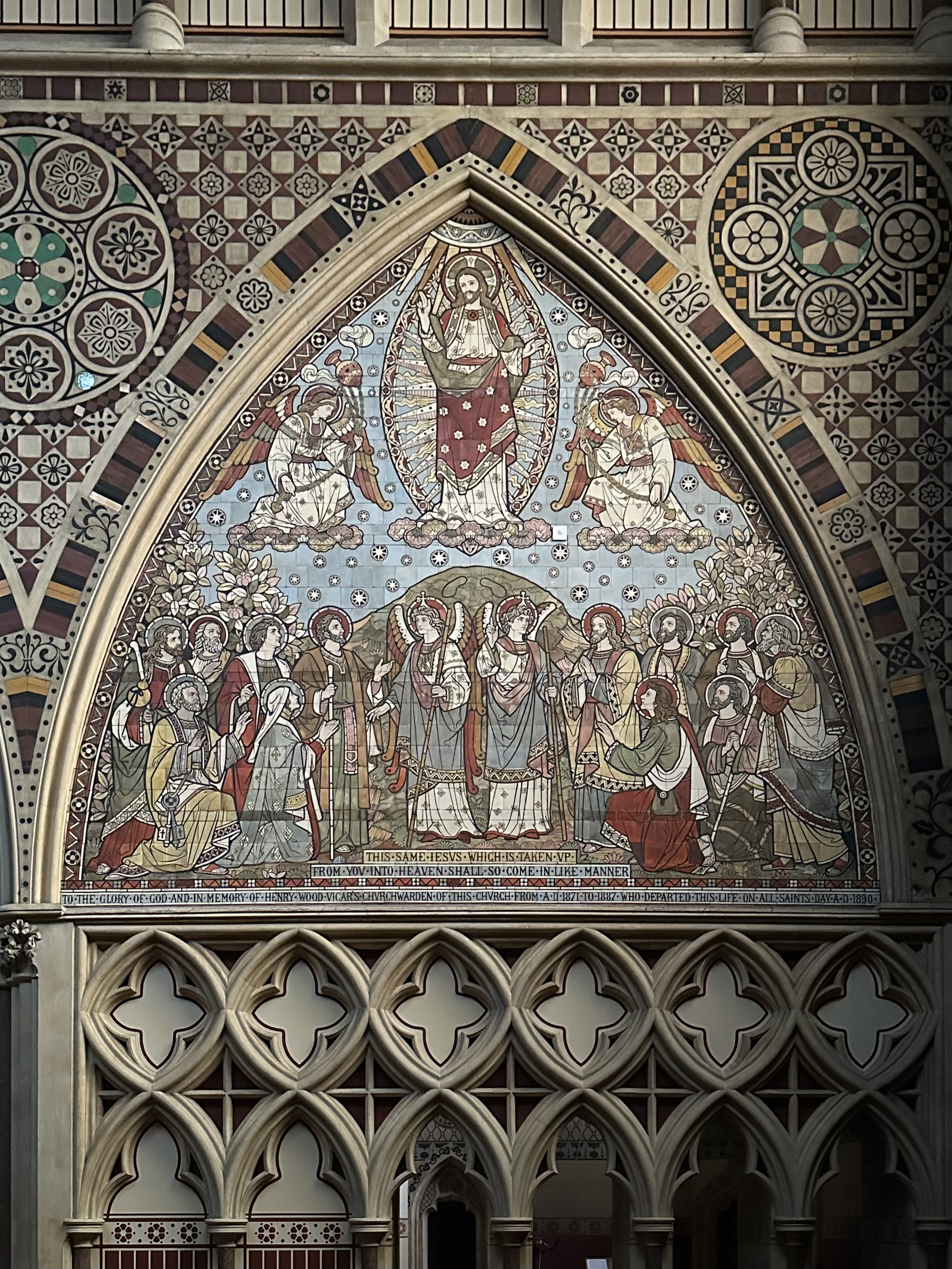
Painted tiles on the south side depicting the Ascension of Jesus.

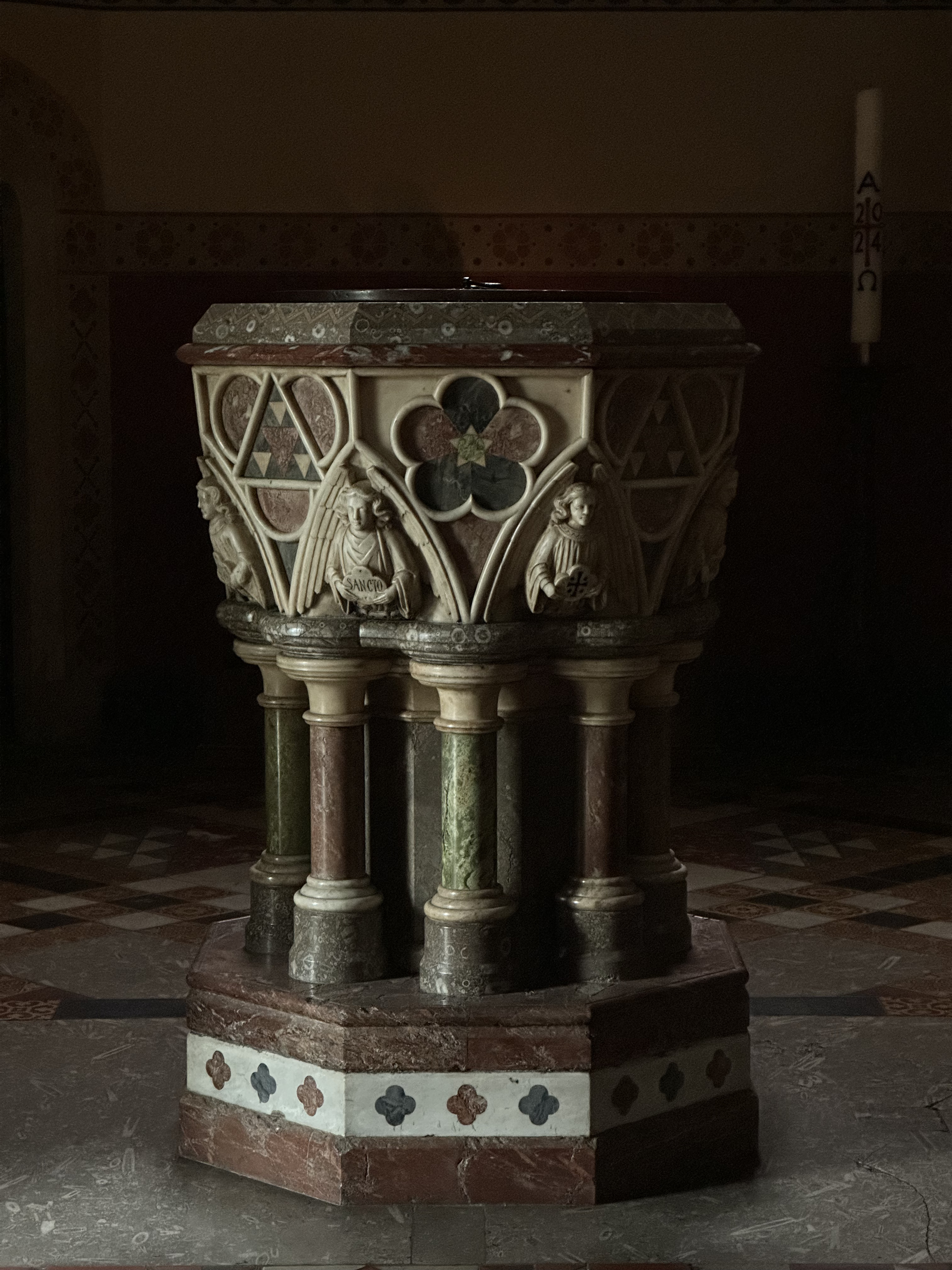
Baptismal font

== Music ==
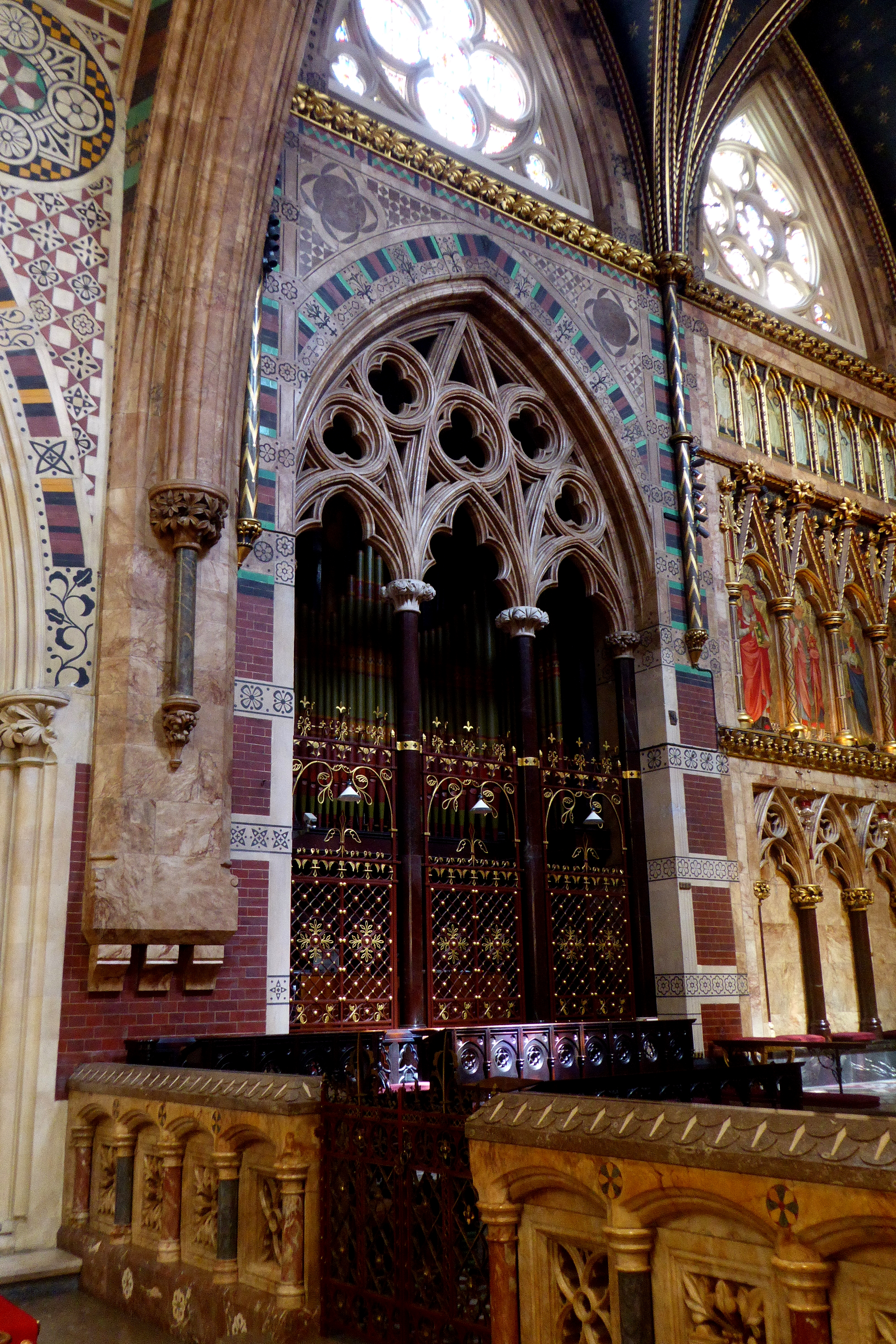
The northern organ pipes of All Saints, to the left of the chancel, enclosed behind a screen. The organ was built by Harrison & Harrison in 1910.

One of the earliest musicians at the church was Richard Redhead, who was appointed organist of Margaret Street Chapel in 1839. He remained organist at the chapel and later at All Saints until 1864, when he joined St Mary Magdalene, Paddington. In 1841, the vicar Frederick Oakeley translated the Latin hymn "Adeste Fideles" into English as "Ye Faithful, Approach Ye" for his congregation. Although Oakeley did not publish his translation, his hymn became notable due to its use at the chapel, and was included in several hymnals in the 19th century. One of its popular arrangements is "O Come All Ye Faithful".

The church's choir school admitted its first chorister in 1848, but its work was paused from 1854 to 1859, during the construction of the new church building. Its choristers sang in the Coronation of Edward VII and Alexandra in 1902 and the Coronation of George V and Mary in 1911. Laurence Olivier was also one of its alumni. The school was eventually closed in 1968 and the boys were replaced by sopranos.

From 1868 to 1907, the organist was William Stevenson Hoyte. The organist-composer Healey Willan, a student of Hoyte, often played for Evensong at the church when he was in London at the beginning of the 20th century. Later, the musical director Walter Vale made an arrangement of Sergei Rachmaninoff's Liturgy of St. John Chrysostom. The Russian composer went to the church in 1924 to listen to Vale's arrangement. From 1953 to 1958, John Birch was the organist and choirmaster.

The current organ was built by Harrison & Harrison from 1910 to 1911. It was converted to electro-pneumatic action in 1957 and restored in 2002.

== See also ==
- List of churches and cathedrals of London
- Keble College, Oxford, whose chapel was designed by William Butterfield in the same style

== Sources ==
- "Who's who". All Saints Margaret Street. 9 January 2020.
- "Previous Archbishops of York: A list of all Archbishops of York since 627". The Archbishop of York.
- Bell, Mackenzie (1898). Christina Rossetti: A Biographical and Critical Study (4 ed.). London: Thomas Burleigh.
- Brooke, C. W. A. (1914). Companions to Hymns A. & M. (PDF) (Old ed.). London: Sir Isaac Pitman & Sons, Ltd.
- Brown, Stewart J.; Nockles, Peter B.; Pereiro, James, eds. (8 June 2017). The Oxford Handbook of the Oxford Movement. Oxford University Press. doi:10.1093/oxfordhb/9780199580187.001.0001. ISBN 9780191750014.
  - Brown, Nockles & Pereiro. Introduction. In Brown, Nockles & Pereiro (2017), pp. 1–6.
  - Carter, Grayson. "Chapter 3: The Evangelical Background". In Brown, Nockles & Pereiro (2017), pp. 38–50.
  - Nockles, Peter B. "Chapter 6: Pre-Tractarian Oxford: Oriel and the Noetics". In Brown, Nockles & Pereiro (2017), pp. 79–94.
  - Gilley, Sheridan. "Chapter 7: Keble, Froude, Newman, and Pusey". In Brown, Nockles & Pereiro (2017), pp. 97–110.
  - Pereiro, James. "Chapter 8: 'A Cloud of Witnesses': Tractarians and Tractarian Ventures". In Brown, Nockles & Pereiro (2017), pp. 111–122.
  - Cooper, Austin. "Chapter 10: The Tracts for the Times". In Brown, Nockles & Pereiro (2017), pp. 137–150.
  - Doll, Peter. "Chapter 25: The Architectural Impact of the Oxford Movement". In Brown, Nockles & Pereiro (2017), pp. 362–375.
  - Engelhardt, Carol. "Chapter 27: The Revival of the Religious Life: The Sisterhoods". In Brown, Nockles & Pereiro (2017), pp. 387–397.
  - Ludlow, Elizabeth. "Chapter 30: Christina Rossetti and the Pre-Raphaelites". In Brown, Nockles & Pereiro (2017), pp. 427–438.
- "London has a bishop again". Church Times. No. 6699. 5 July 1991. p. 1. ISSN 0009-658X – via UK Press Online archives.
- Dwyer, Mark (2023). "Healey Willan, Part II: Canada and a Life's Work". The Anglican Way. Vol. II, no. VI.
- Eastlake, Charles Locke (1872). A History of the Gothic Revival. London: Longmans, Green & Co.
- The Editors of Encyclopaedia Britannica (20 August 2020). "Oxford movement". Encyclopædia Britannica.
- ——— (2 November 2021). "Anglo-Catholicism". Encyclopædia Britannica.
- Gadher, Dipesh (1 April 2018). "Take up thy bed and. . . bring it back for a sleep after mass". The Times.
- Galloway, Peter; Rawll, Christopher (1988). Good & Faithful Servants: The Vicars of All Saints Church, Margaret Street, London W1. Worthing, West Sussex: Churchman Publishing Limited. ISBN 1-85093-104-6.
- Gill, Richard (2013). Christina Rossetti: Selected Poems. Oxford University Press. ISBN 9780199129775.
- Greenfield, Edward (April 2006). "(The) English Rachmaninov". Gramophone.
- Harrison & Harrison (2021), All Saints' Church, Margaret Street (PDF), harrisonorgans.com
- Julian, John, ed. (1915). A Dictionary of Hymnology: Setting Forth the Origin and History of Christian Hymns of All Ages and Nations. Vol. 1 (2 ed.). London: John Murray.
- Love, James (1891). "Redheard, Richard". Scottish Church Music: Its Composer and Sources. William Blackwood and Sons. pp. 232–233.
- Mayhew, Peter (1987). "Margaret Street". All Saints: Birth and Growth of a Community. Oxford. ISBN 9780951276402.
- Mullally, Sarah; Baker, Jonathan (22 July 2020). "Pastoral Letter to All Saints Margaret Street" (PDF). All Saints Margaret Street.
- "The Coronation of King Edward the Seventh and Queen Alexandra in the Collegiate Church of St. Peter in Westminster, August 9, 1902". The Musical Times. Vol. 43, no. 715. 1 September 1902. pp. 577–586. JSTOR 3369739.
- "The Coronation of King George the Fifth and Queen Mary in Westminster Abbey, June 22, 1911". The Musical Times. Vol. 52, no. 821. 1 July 1911. pp. 433–437. JSTOR 907261.
- Pfaff, Richard W. (July 1973). "The Library of the Fathers: The Tractarians as Patristic Translators". Studies in Philology. 70 (3): 329–344. JSTOR 4173813.
- Roberts, Stephen (22 May 2012). "John Birch obituary". The Guardian.
- Stephen, Leslie, ed. (1888). "Dodsworth, William" . Dictionary of National Biography. Vol. 15. London: Smith, Elder & Co.
- Temple, Philip; Thom, Colin, eds. (2017). "All Saints Church". South-East Marylebone: Part 2. Survey of London. Vol. 52. Yale University Press. pp. 731–747.
- Thomas, Eleanor Walter (1931). Christina Georgina Rossetti (PhD thesis). New York: Columbia University.
- Wakeling, G. (1895). The Oxford Church Movement: Sketches and Reflections. London: Swan Sonnenschein.
- Whitworth, William Allen (1891). Quam Dilecta: A Description of All Saints' Church, Margaret Street, with Historical Notes of Margaret Chapel and All Saints' Church. London: Wells Gardner, Darton & Co.
