= Maple Street, London =

London street

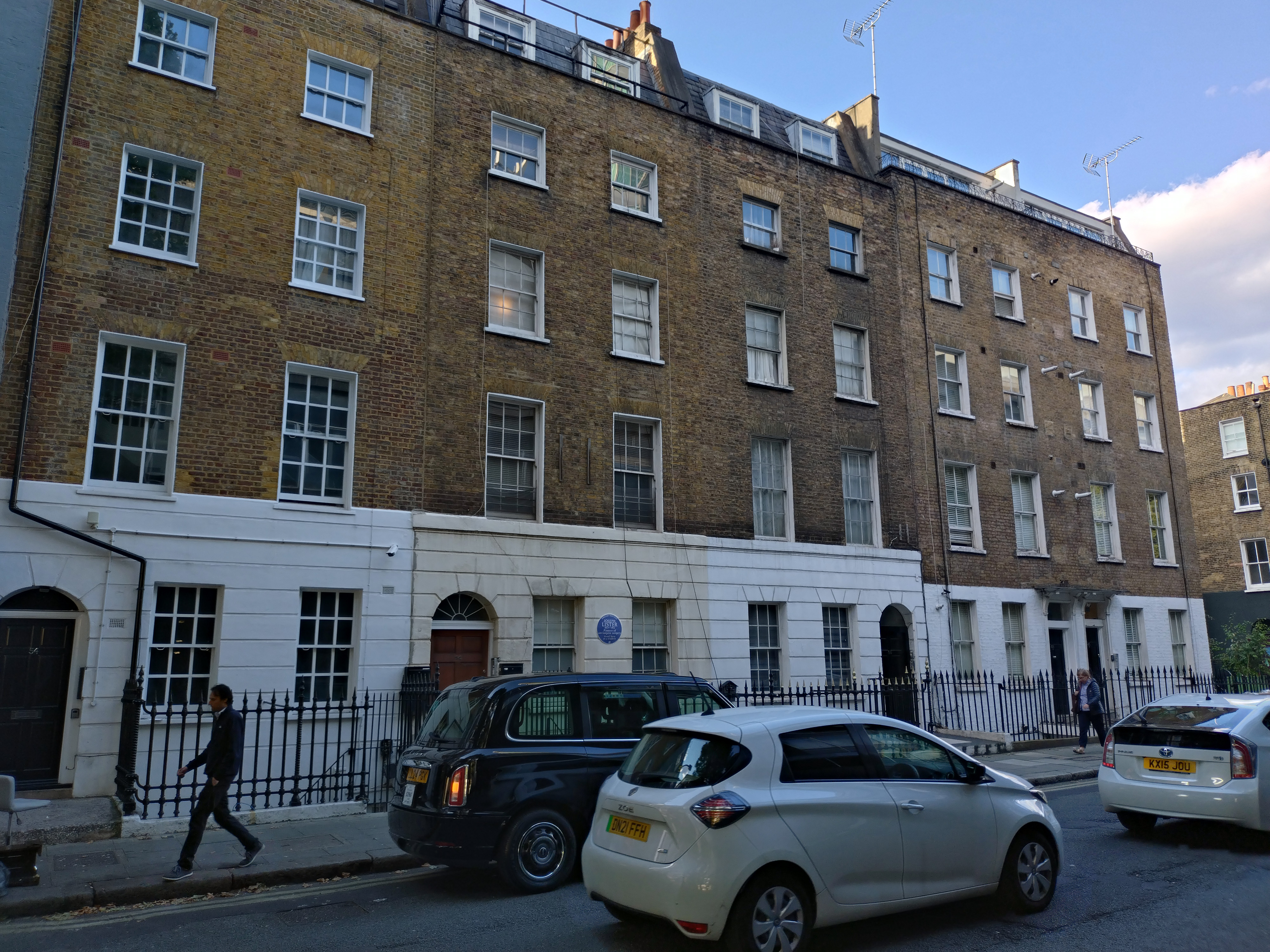
Maple Street in 2024

Maple Street is located in the Fitzrovia district of Central London.

It was originally London Street, and was laid out for building from 1777 to 1778.

It runs roughly west to east from Tottenham Court Road to Cleveland Street and crosses Whitfield Street and Fitzroy Street.

From 1844, Joseph Lister lived at no. 52 (then 28 London Street) as a medical student, with fellow Quaker, Edward Palmer.

The artist Harold Gilman had lodgings at 47 Maple Street from 1914 to 1917, where he painted some of his best known works, including his landlady, Mrs Mounter at the Breakfast Table.
