= Jacob Leroux =

Architect

Jacob Leroux (1737–1799) was an architect and developer. He is best known for Polygon developments in Southampton and Somers Town.

== Early life ==
Jacob Leroux was born in Covent Garden, London, to John Leroux and Mary Bonet. He was baptised on 8 Jan 1737 at St Paul's Covent Garden, commonly known as the Actors Church. He had at least two siblings; John, a watchmaker, and James Leroux.

== Career ==
In 1766 Jacob Leroux was employed by Francis and William Goodge to overlook the development of their land near Tottenham Court Road. Through the 1770s and 1780s he built properties on Cumberland Street (now Goodge Place), Goodge Street, Charlotte Street, Warren Street, and Tottenham Court Road itself.

In the 1770s, Leroux was appointed the architect for the remodelling of Cams Hall, Fareham, a Palladian mansion set in parkland overlooking Portsmouth Harbour. This was constructed in 1770 of Portland stone and yellow bricks and was commissioned by John Carnac.

In 1777 Leroux appears as a Justice of the Peace for Middlesex; a role which saw him signing off on new property under the new London Building Act 1774. Occasionally, Leroux signed off his own houses.

In the 1780s, he was appointed architect for the new Middlesex House of Correction in Coldpath Fields, Clerkenwell.

=== The Southampton Polygon ===
Leroux was employed by Isaac Mallorie and John Carnac to design a Polygon development in Southampton; work began in 1768. This was expected to match the new buildings of other resort towns such as Bath and Tunbridge Wells.

Leroux initially planned for this Polygon to cover twenty-two acres and consist of twelve large houses with long gardens, as well as a hotel, meeting room and a chapel. In 1771 he exhibited at the Royal Academy A view of part of the Polygon, now building at Southampton and in 1772 A design for the publick chapel and shops, forming a forum, intended to be built in the Polygon, Southampton.

Ultimately, only three of the planned houses were built with the scheme abandoned around 1773. These houses were later collated into the Polygon Hotel.

=== The Somers Town Polygon ===
This development was created on land at Brill Farm which was leased from Lord Somers and adjacent to the New Road built from Paddington to Islington. The Polygon was a sixteen sided building with thirty-two houses and a centre containing gardens and stables. It was laid out inside the circle of a carriage road, Claremont Square, in a similar vein to the earlier Southampton Polygon. Leroux was also a brick maker and provided the bricks for the development, using the local and historic kilns of the St Pancras area to cut costs.

== Personal life ==
Jacob Leroux married twice; his first marriage was on 26 Sep 1761 to Louisa Bromhall at St Anne's, Soho and his second marriage was on 27 Jul 1771 to Mary Bayley at St Martin in the Fields, Westminster. He had at least three children with Louisa, and at least four children with Mary.

== Works ==
- Thoughts on the Present State of Prisons in this Country

== Death ==
Jacob Leroux died in 1799 in St Pancras, London.

== Legacy ==
His will detailed that half of the estate of Somer's Town be left to his son Midford George Leroux (1767-1863).

The Somers Town Polygon had a few famous resident's, Mary Woolstonecraft gave birth to Mary Shelley there, and Charles Dickens resided there as a boy. Dickens also mentioned the development in several of his novels. The Polygon was demolished in late 1891 and replaced with the Polygon Buildings which subsequently gave rise to Oakshott Court. Today the development lives on in the street name Polygon Road and a local mural depicts the once iconic building.

Many of Leroux's buildings are still standing, dotted around Bloomsbury and Fitzrovia.
