= John Prince's Street =

Street in Marylebone, London

Coordinates: 51.5157°N 0.1430°W

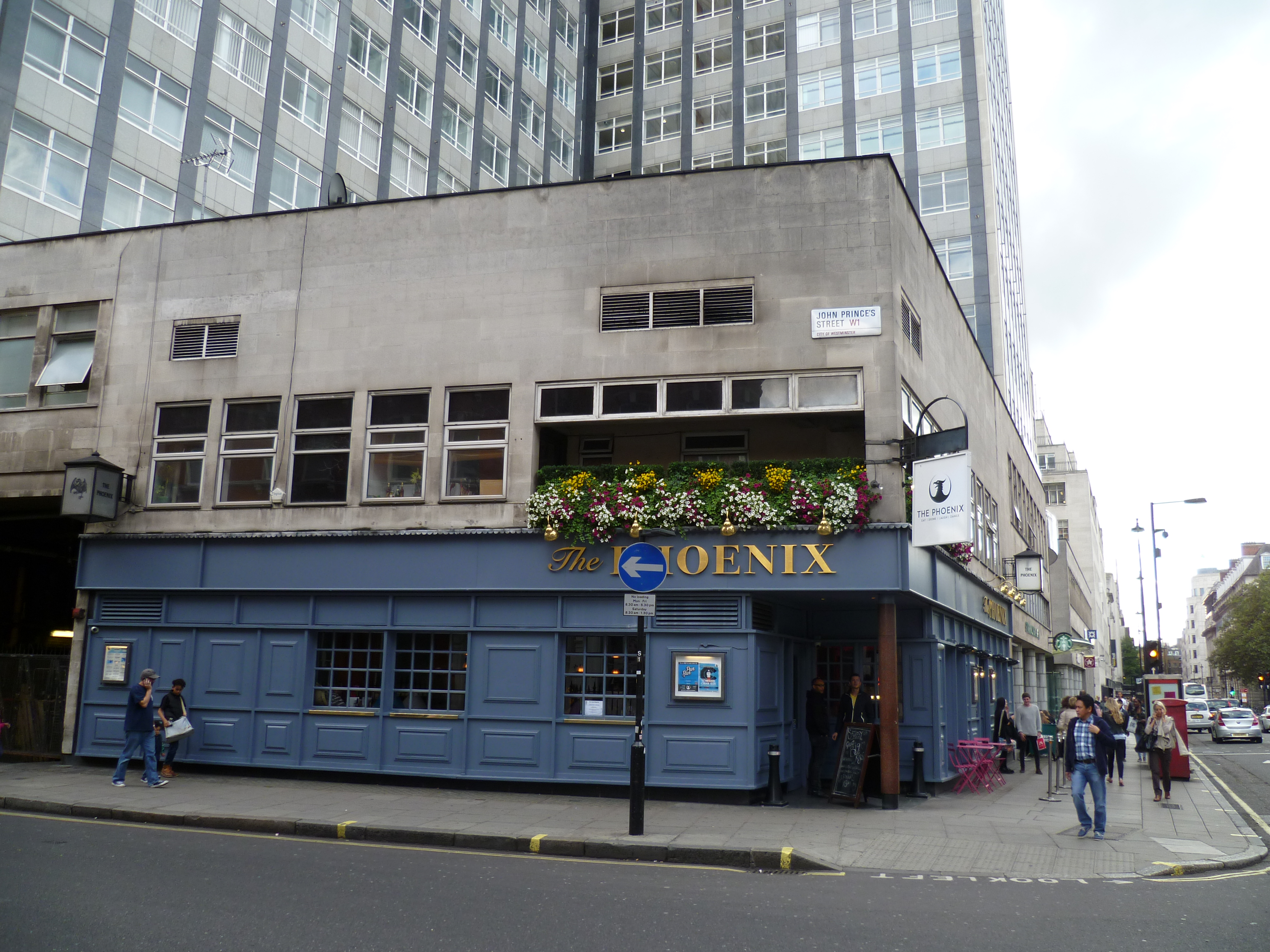
The Phoenix public house, on the corner with Margaret Street

John Prince's Street, also Princes Street, is a street in Marylebone in the City of Westminster in central London that runs from Margaret Street in the north to Oxford Street in the south. It is joined on its eastern side by Great Castle Street.

== History ==
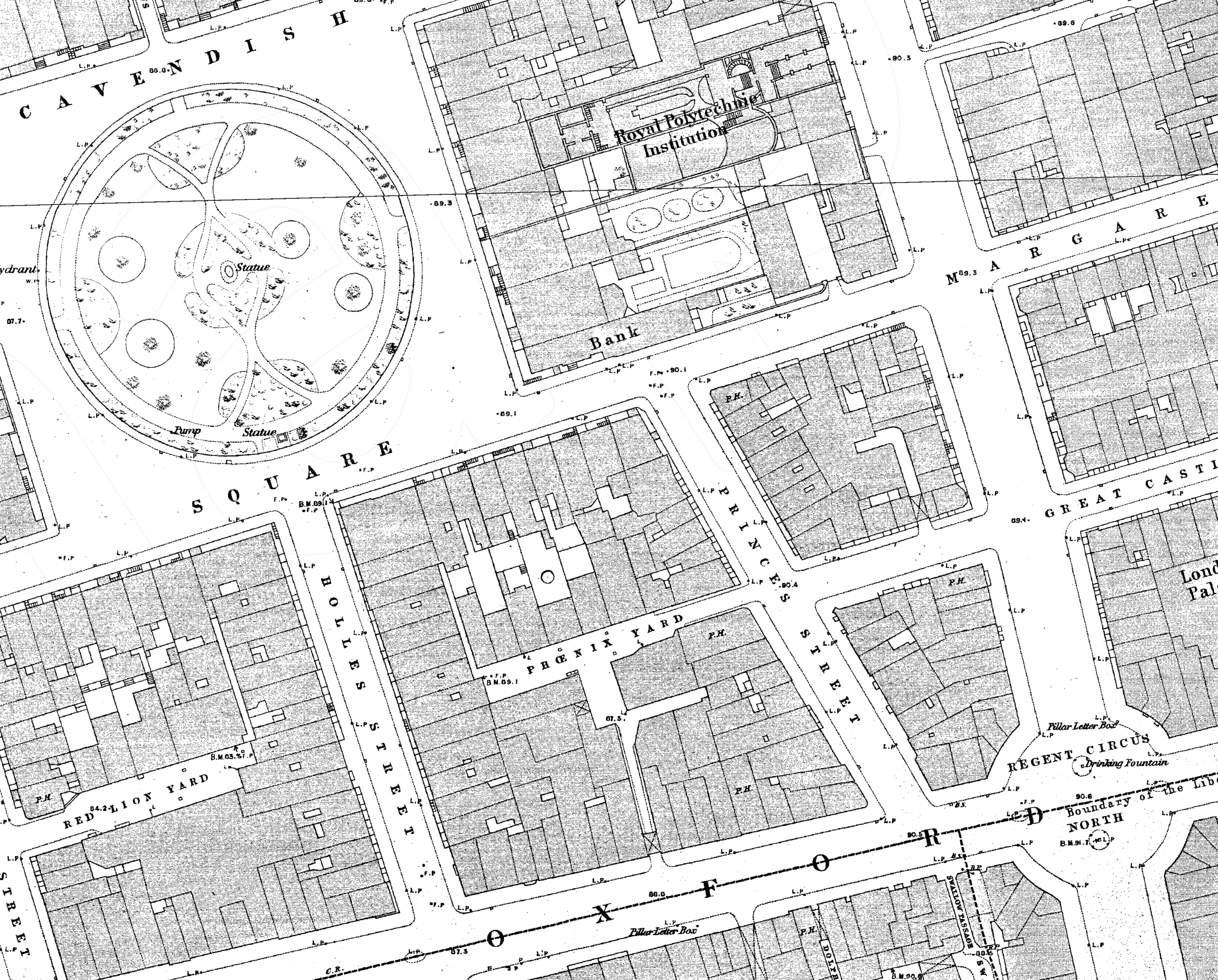
John Prince's Street marked as Princes Street on an 1870s Ordnance Survey map.

The street was one of those laid out around 1729 when the area north of Oxford Street was urbanised on a grid pattern. It was named after John Prince, an employee of Edward Harley after whom Harley Street was named and who owned the land. Harley employed John Prince to lay out the streets on the Harley estate and John's Prince's Street was one of the first set out. Contemporary newspaper the Morning Advertiser, described Prince as vain and arrogant and a self-styled "Prince of Builders". The cul-de-sac Phoenix Yard once ran from the western side, opposite Great Castle Street, into the centre of what is now the London College of Fashion and BHS.

== Today ==
Once the location of small shops and houses, the street is now taken up by the London College of Fashion and the former British Home Stores department store (1962–63) on the western side and small retail premises on the eastern side. The Phoenix public house is at the north end on the western side on the corner with Margaret Street.
