= Christ Church, Albany Street =

Coordinates: 51°31′49″N 0°8′40″W

Christ Church
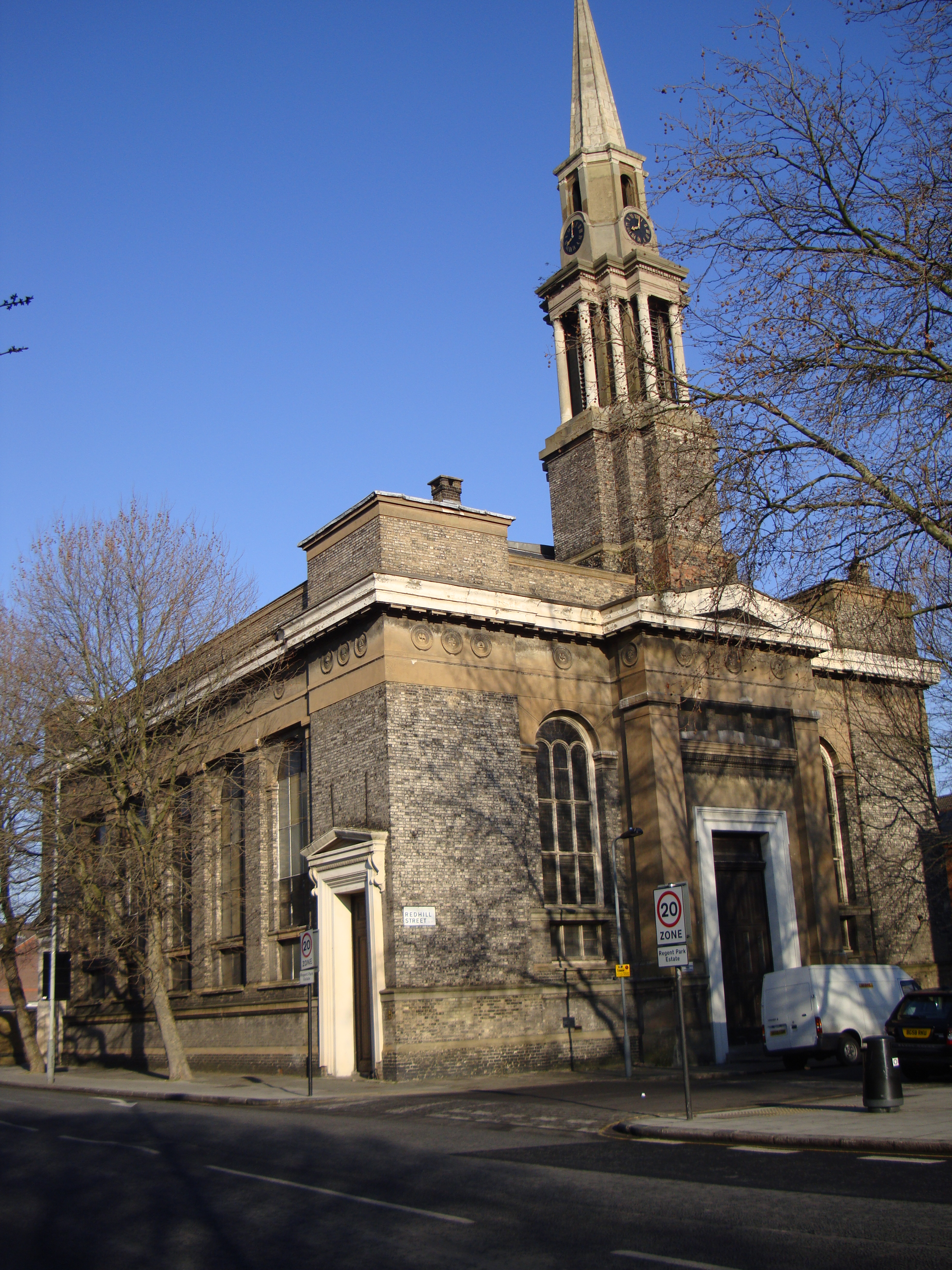
- Christ Church
- Location: London, NW1
- Country: England
- Previous denomination: Church of England, Antiochian Orthodox

History
- Dedicated: 1837

Architecture
- Architect: James Pennethorne
- Style: Neoclassical
- Closed: 2023

Christ Church Albany Street is a former church building in Albany Street, St Pancras, in the London Borough of Camden. Built to the designs of James Pennethorne, it was consecrated as an Anglican place of worship called Christ Church in 1837. It was an Antiochian Orthodox cathedral from 1989 to 2023 as St George's Cathedral.

== Description ==
The building, designed by James Pennethorne, stands on the corner of Redhill Street (formerly Edward Street) and Albany Street. It is not strictly orientated, its ceremonial east end, with the altar, facing slightly west of north. It is rectangular in plan, and built of brick with stucco and stone dressings, its four corners emphasised by wide tower-like features, projecting slightly beyond the main lines of the walls. The architecture is broadly classical in style. A deep stucco entablature runs around the whole building, with a simple brick parapet above it. The windows are round-headed. There is a tower above the entrance, topped by an octagonal spire. The steeple is unusually small in comparison with the main body of the church.

== History ==
=== Anglican church ===
It was built as an Anglican church to serve the largely working class district of Cumberland Market. Consecrated on 13 July 1837, it established itself firmly within the high church Oxford Movement. Its first incumbent, William Dodsworth, previously of the Margaret Street Chapel, resigned on his conversion to Roman Catholicism.

On the recommendation of the painter William Collins R.A, a copy of Raphael's Transfiguration by Thomas Brigstocke was purchased as an altarpiece. Alterations were made to the church between 1839 and 1843 by the architect R.C. Carpenter, and further changes, including the installation of an elaborate inlaid marble floor, were made in 1867 by William Butterfield.

Christina Rossetti lived on Albany Street for a couple of years and attended the church. Her brother Dante Gabriel Rossetti produced a stained-glass window depicting the Sermon on the Mount for the church, a reproduction of one at All Saints Church, Selsley.

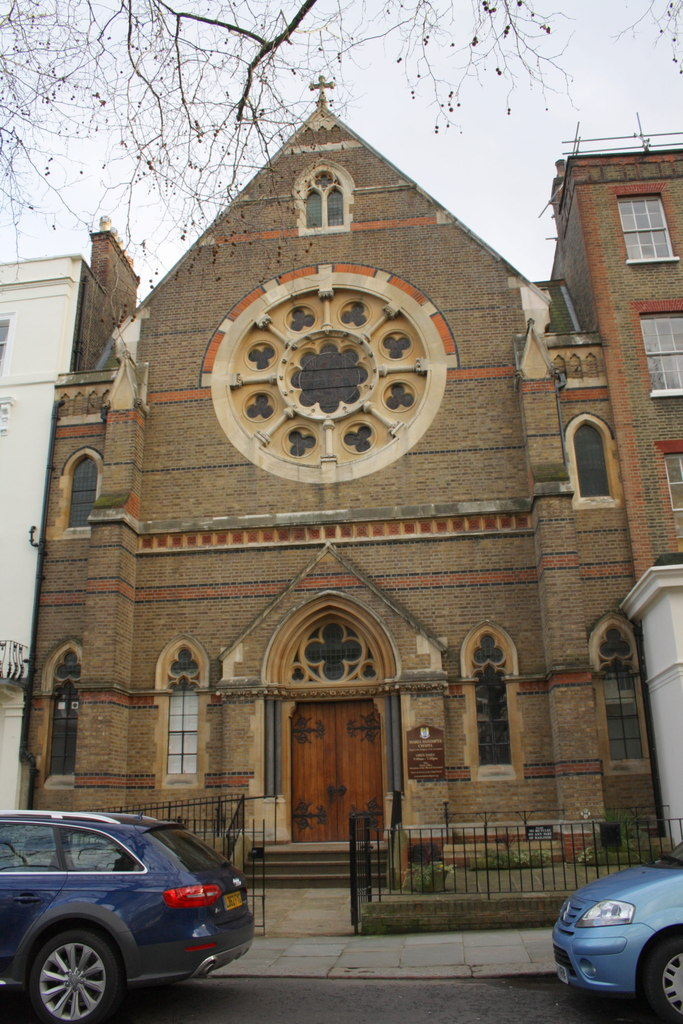
The current home of the cathedral, the Maria Assumpta Chapel, a Roman Catholic convent chapel in South Kensington.

A school grew up on Redhill Street near the church, called Christ Church Primary School. On 26 January 1950 the funeral service of George Orwell, was held at the church, as it was near to both Middlesex Hospital where he died and BBC Broadcasting House, where he worked. The church was designated a Grade II* listed building on 10 June 1954.

In 1974, the Albany Consort, an early music group, was founded at the church.

=== Orthodox cathedral ===
In 1989 Christ Church ceased to be a place of Anglican worship (with its parish merged back into its daughter church of St Mary Magdalene Munster Square) and became St George's Cathedral. A new roof was built in 2000.

In 2023, after more than 30 years, the church's poor state of maintenance led to it being permanently closed, with the seat of the Metropolitan Bishop moved to St George Orthodox Antiochan parish in Kensington. With St Botolph-without-Bishopsgate in the City of London it is one of two Antiochan churches in London.

== See also ==
- List of works by R. C. Carpenter
