= Audley House, London =

Building in City of Westminster, England

Coordinates: 51.5171°N 0.1396°W

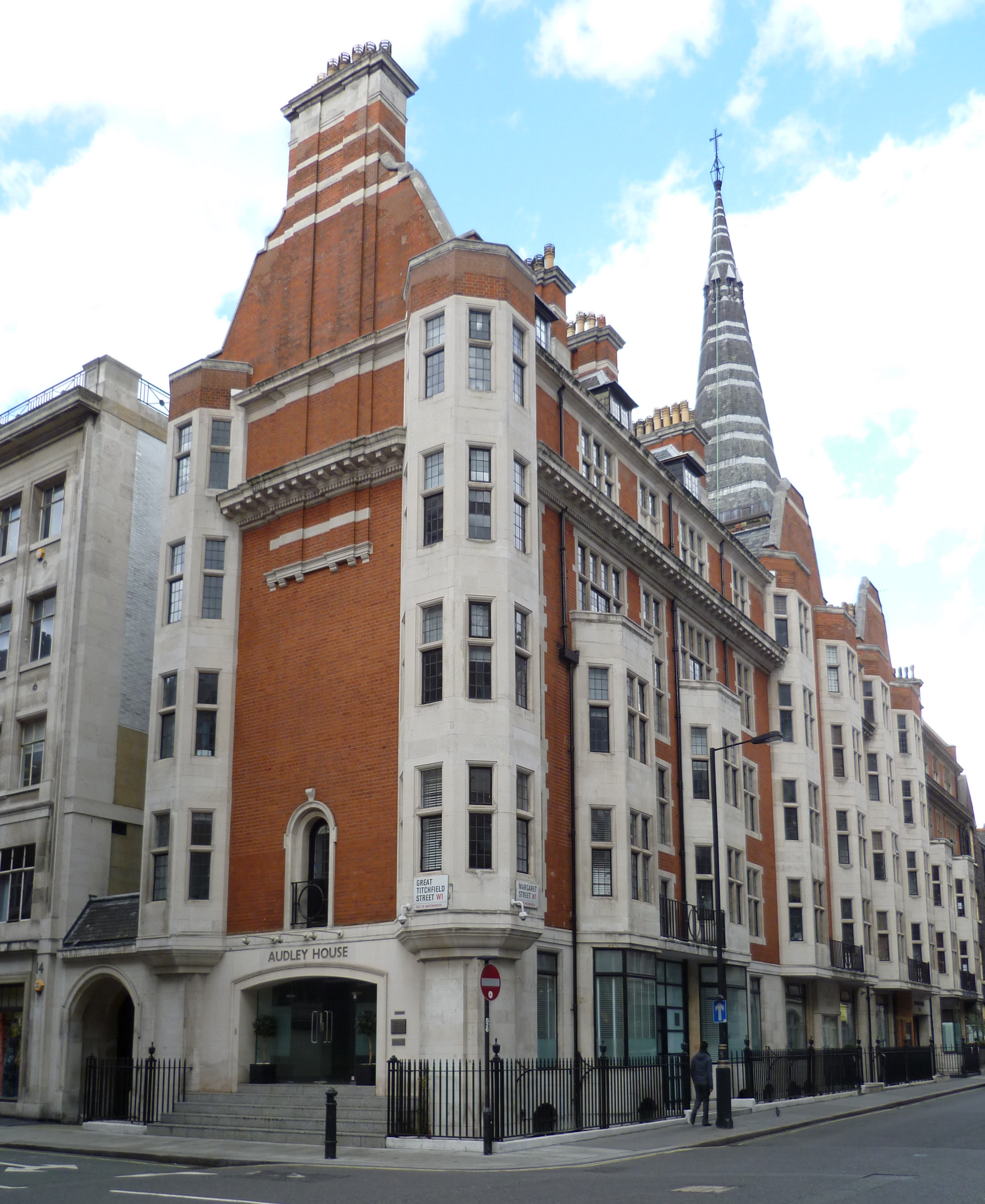
Audley House

Audley House is a grade II listed block of flats at 9–12 Margaret Street on the corner with Great Titchfield Street in the City of Westminster, England.

Audley House was built in 1907 by J. W. Simpson and M. Ayrton. It is in red brick with stone dressings and a slate roof. It was built as bachelor flats, with five storeys, a basement, and attics.

The property is moments away from the international retail thoroughfare of Oxford Street & Regent Street and a short walk away from Regent's Park.
