= Scala Street =

Street in London

Coordinates: 51.52005°N 0.13559°W

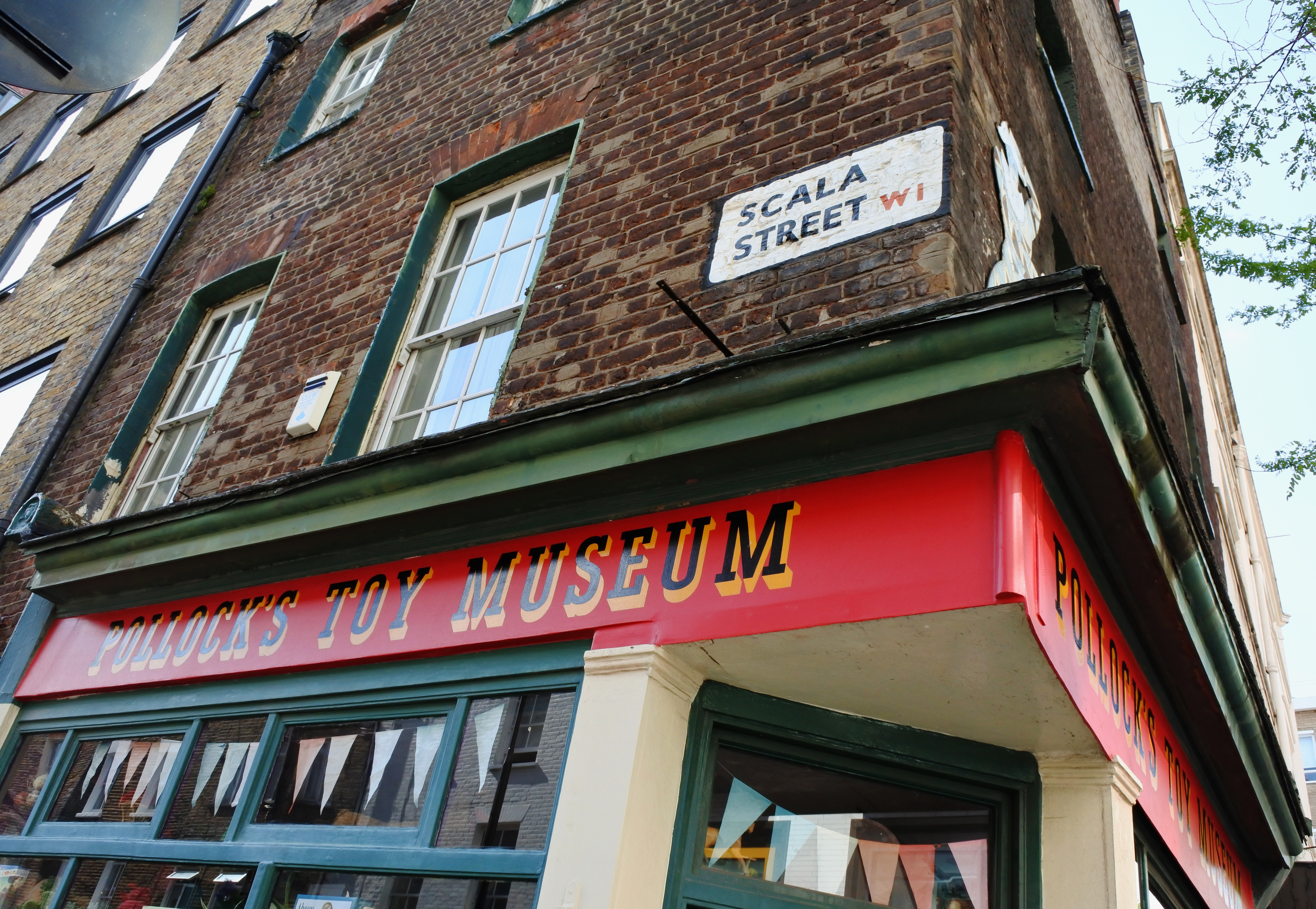
Pollock's Toy Museum in Scala Street

Scala Street is a street in the London Borough of Camden that runs between Charlotte Street and Whitfield Street. It was formerly known as Pitt Street but was renamed after the Scala Theatre when this occupied most of its north side. The street's postcode is W1T 2HW.

The street is the location of Pollock's Toy Museum, which moved there in 1969 from its original premises in Monmouth Street. The brown-brick building dates from around 1767 and is listed at grade II.

== Pitt Street ==

The street was developed as Pitt Street by the architect and speculative builder Jacob Leroux. He built residential housing on 17 plots with a frontage of 17 feet 9 inches and a depth of 40 feet. These were comparatively high density, not allowing space for the workshops required for artisanal use.

== Scala Street ==
The street was renamed after the Scala Theatre in 1937. In 1964, a scene in the movie, A Hard Day's Night, was shot in the street, in which the Beatles were shown arriving at the back entrance of the theatre and escaping fans by hiding in a canvas workman's hut. The theatre was demolished after a fire and the site is now occupied by a block called Scala House.
