= Whitfield Street =

Street in London Borough of Camden, United Kingdom

Coordinates: 51°31′16.27″N 0°8′9.92″W

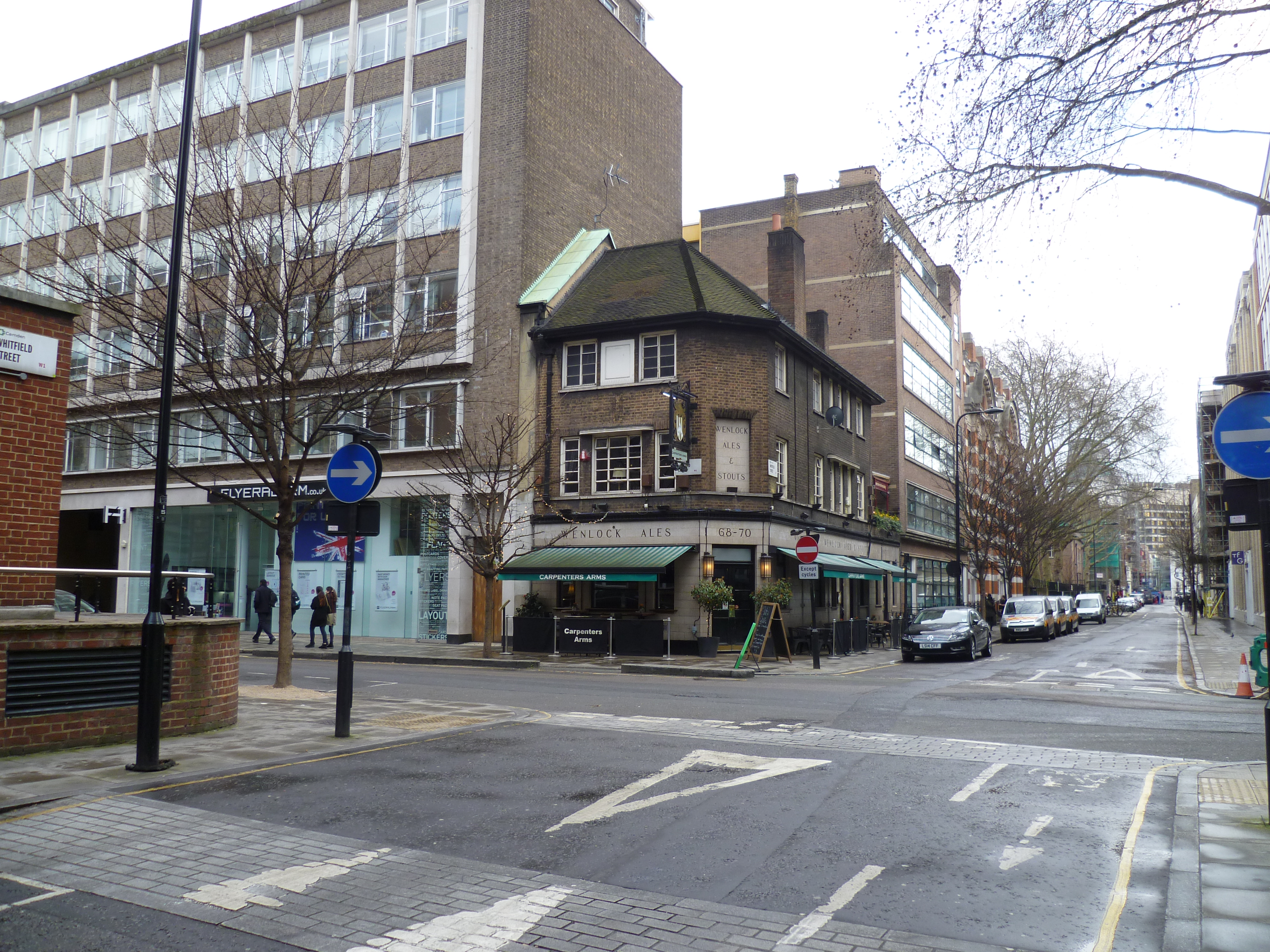
The Carpenters Arms pub in Whitfield Street.

Whitfield Street is a street in the London Borough of Camden that runs from Warren Street in the north to Windmill Street in the south. The street is crossed by Grafton Way, Maple Street, Howland Street, Tottenham Street, and Goodge Street. Whitfield Place starts and ends in Whitfield Street on its eastern side. Hertford Place, Chitty Street and Scala Street all join Whitfield Street on its western side.

The street was named after George Whitefield who founded a chapel in nearby Tottenham Court Road.
