= Chitty Street =

Street in London

Coordinates: 51.5209°N 0.1365°W

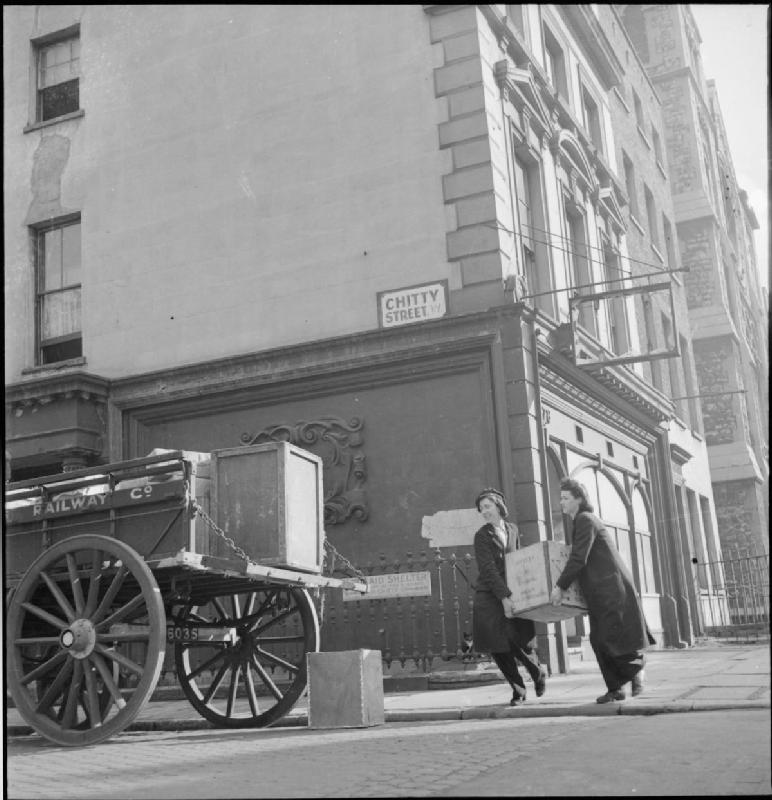
Chitty Street in 1943.

Chitty Street is a street in the London Borough of Camden that runs between Charlotte Street and Whitfield Street. Charlotte Mews adjoins Chitty Street on its south side.

Chitty Street was originally known as North Street and marked the southern border of the Bedford Estate on the western side of Tottenham Court Road. Leases on the plots on the north side of the street were granted to builder William Gowing in 1776. All the original buildings of Chitty Street have been replaced with modern buildings.
