= Grafton Way =

Street in London

Coordinates: 51°31′27.04″N 0°8′9.47″W

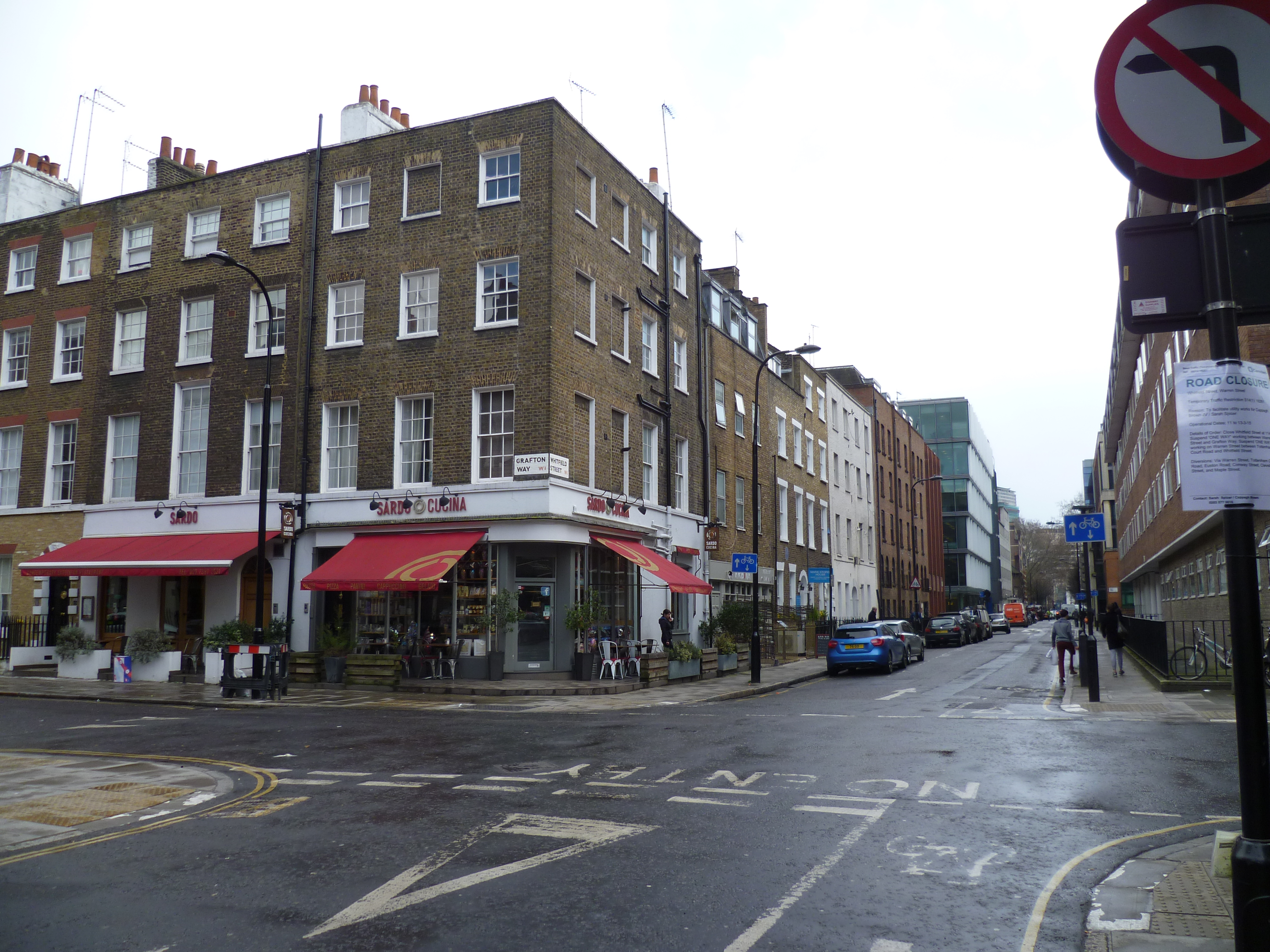
Grafton Way and Whitfield Street

Grafton Way is a street in the London Borough of Camden that runs from Gower Street in the east to Fitzroy Street in the west, crossing Tottenham Court Road half way along its length. Whitfield Street and Grafton Mews adjoin Grafton Way.

The street was originally known as Grafton Street.

Venezuelan revolutionary Francisco de Miranda lived in Grafton Street from 1803 to 1810.
