= Margaret Street, London =

Street in the City of Westminster, London

Margaret Street
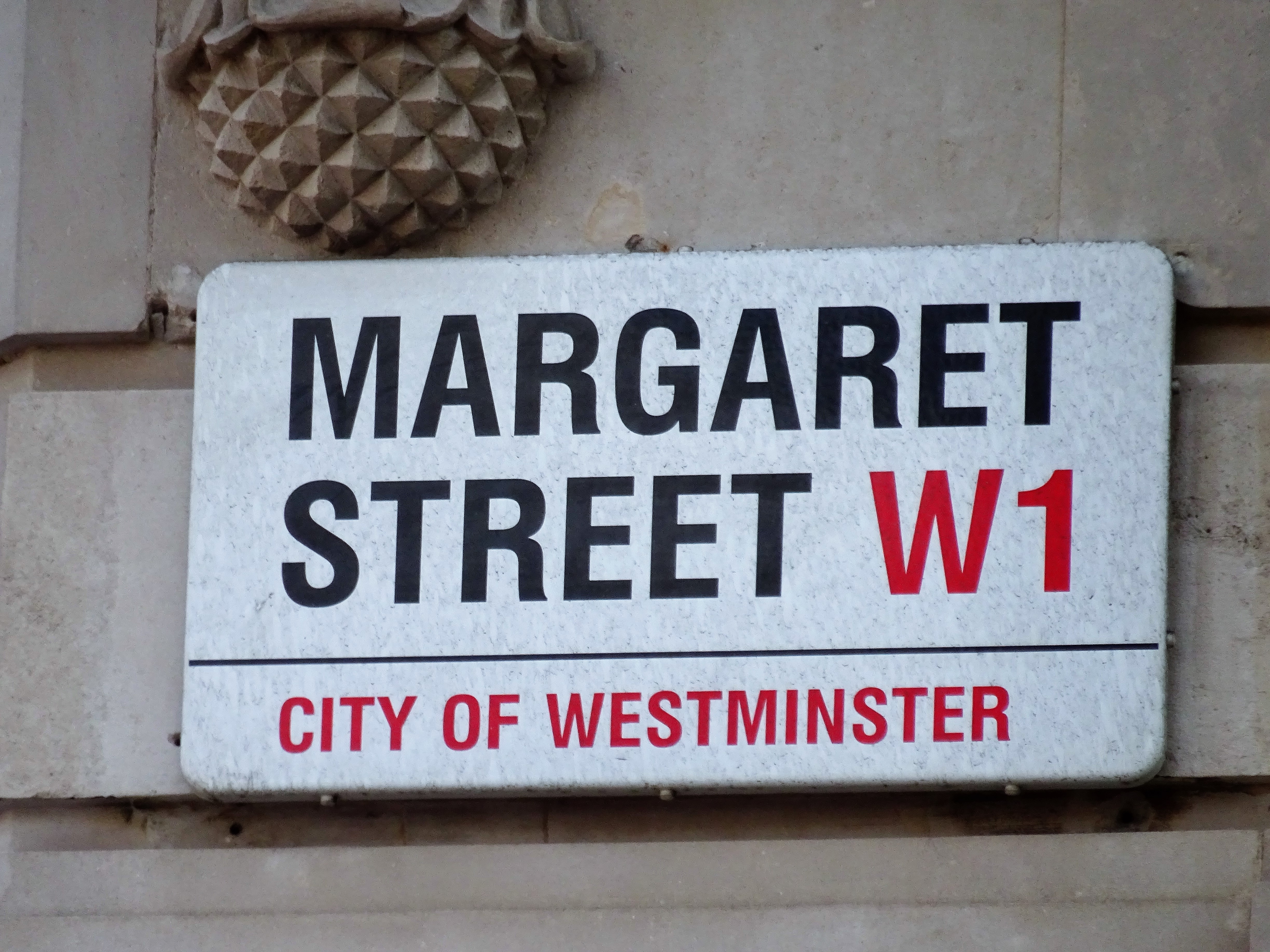

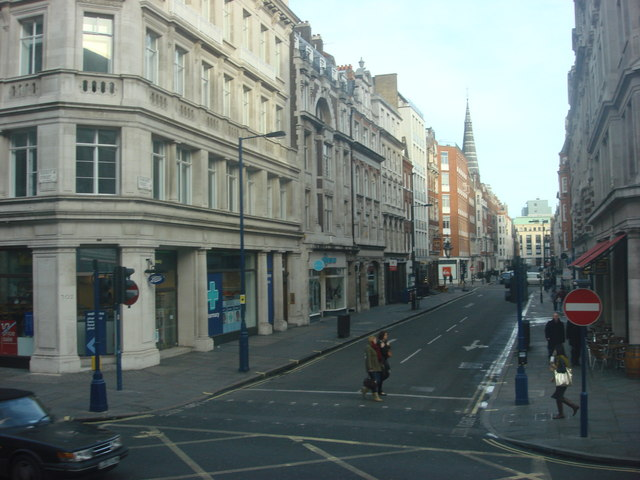
- View east along Margaret Street

- Location within City of Westminster
- Maintained by: Transport for London
- Location: London, United Kingdom
- Postal code: W1
- Nearest Tube station: Oxford Circus
- Coordinates: 51.516682°N 0.14119451°W
- West end: Cavendish Square
- East end: Wells Street

Other
- Known for: All Saints Church; Audley House; Langham Estate; London Fo Guang Shan Temple; The Speakeasy Club

Margaret Street is a street that straddles the Marylebone and Fitzrovia areas of the City of Westminster in the West End of London, running from Cavendish Square to Wells Street via Regent Street (A4201), Great Portland Street, and Great Titchfield Street. It is north of and parallel to the major shopping street, Oxford Street. John Prince's Street runs between Margaret Street and Oxford Street.

The street is named after Margaret Bentinck, Duchess of Portland, daughter of the local landowner Edward Harley, 2nd Earl of Oxford and Earl Mortimer. William Winlaw was an 18th-century engine-maker who was based in Margaret Street.

George Henry FitzRoy, 4th Duke of Grafton had a London town house on Margaret Street in the 1790s.

All Saints Church, a Victorian Grade I listed Anglo-Catholic church, designed by the architect William Butterfield and built between 1850 and 1859, is located on the north side of the street. Audley House is a grade II listed block of flats built in 1907, at 9–12 Margaret Street on the corner with Great Titchfield Street. The Speakeasy Club was a club situated at 48 Margaret Street that was a late-night meeting place for the music industry between 1966 and 1978. The London Fo Guang Shan Temple, established in 1992, is located at 84 Margaret Street.

== See also ==
- Street names of Marylebone
- Street names of Fitzrovia
