= Warren Street =

Street in the London Borough of Camden

Coordinates: 51.52431°N 0.13872°W

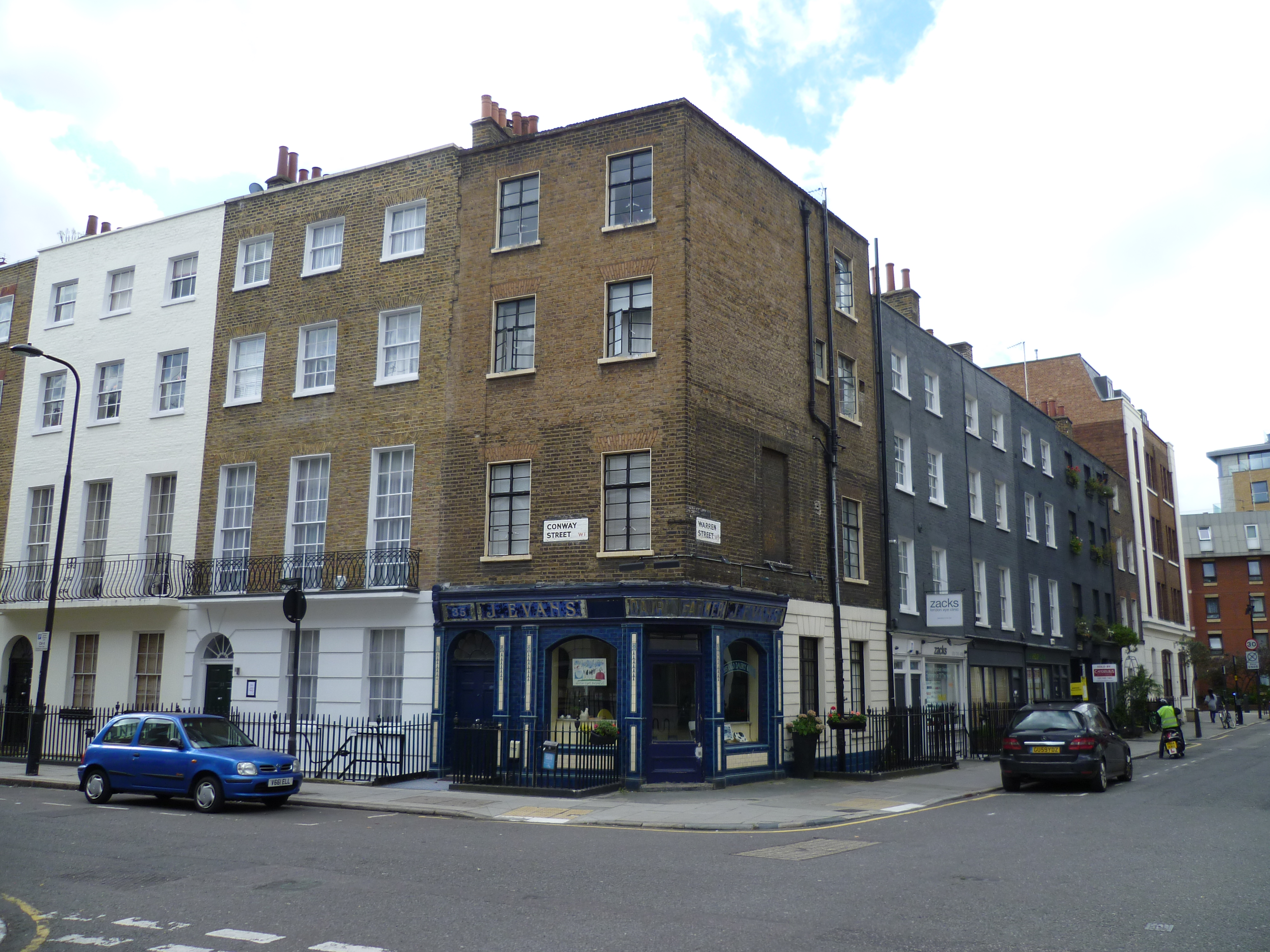
The corner of Conway Street and Warren Street in 2015.

Warren Street is a street in the London Borough of Camden that runs from Cleveland Street in the west to Tottenham Court Road in the east, in the northernmost section of the Fitzrovia district. Warren Street tube station is located at the eastern end of the street.

== History ==
The street is crossed by Conway Street in the east and Fitzroy Street at its midpoint. On the south side of Warren Street lie Warren Mews, Richardson's Mews, Grafton Mews, and Whitfield Street. It was mostly constructed in the late 18th century.

It is named after Admiral Sir Peter Warren whose daughter and heiress Anne was wife of Charles FitzRoy, 1st Baron Southampton and thus the first Lady Southampton. Originally a residential street, it now contains mostly shops and businesses.
