= Great Titchfield Street =

Street in the West End of London

Coordinates: 51°31′11″N 0°08′28″W

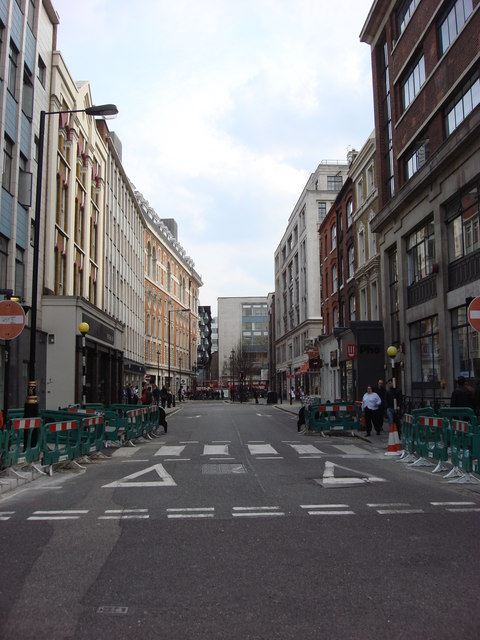
Great Titchfield Street businesses and showrooms in London's West End

Great Titchfield Street is a mixed-use street in the West End of London. It runs north from Oxford Street to Greenwell Street. It lies within the informally designated London area of Fitzrovia. In administrative terms it is in the West End Ward of the City of Westminster. Its southern stretches make part of the East Marylebone Conservation Area which received designation in 1982.

== History ==
Like the better known Portland Place and Great Portland Street which run parallel with it to the west, Great Titchfield Street was developed by the Dukes of Portland, who owned most of the eastern half of Marylebone in the 18th and 19th centuries.

It appears half complete on the John Rocque map of 1746. At that time it only ran from Oxford Street to Riding House Street. In 1757, the New Road, now Marylebone Road, was laid out to provide a route around built-up London. This encouraged residential development in the area, with a regular grid of streets centred on Great Titchfield Street and Great Portland Street. Great Titchfield Street appears in its current complete form on the Richard Horwood map of 1793 (Guildhall Archives).

In 1907, Audley House, a grade II listed red brick block of flats, was built at the corner with Margaret Street.

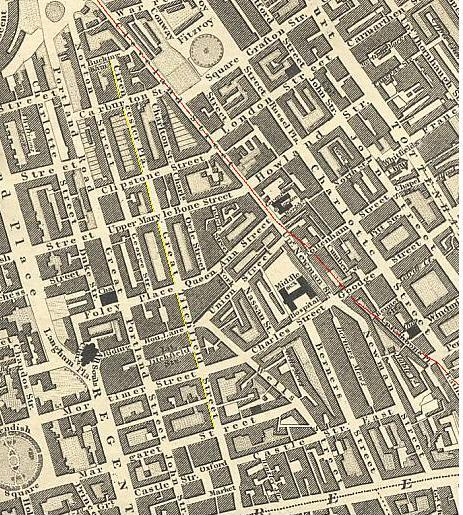
Great Titchfield Street was also named Cirencester Place on its northern stretch in Greenwoods' map of 1827

== Character ==
By the mid-19th century it was described as being in an area of "dirty shops and dingy private dwellings...where children never washed" (quote from Pevsner and Cherry, 1991, London 3: North West). However, in February 1900, F.S.Webster, rector of the All Souls Church, Langham Place described how "the locality east of Great Titchfield Street is rapidly changing. The old dwelling houses are being pulled down and large blocks containing small residential flats and business premises are being built in their place whose flats...are too expensive for working people" (quote from B Hanson, 1993, The Golden City Essays).

The garment industry, historically important in the East Marylebone and Soho areas, continues to have a presence in Great Titchfield Street. In recent years many have been displaced by the arrival of media organisations, television production and post-production companies and a number of highly specialised boutiques including E-Man, Side, Wise Buddah and Maverick Media. The radio & television stations of the Canadian Broadcasting Corporation have their UK Office & Administration headquarters at 43-51 Great Titchfield Street.

Like Charlotte Street, its near neighbour to the east, Great Titchfield Street is also home to a diverse range of specialist restaurants including Scandinavian Kitchen (Norwegian, Swedish and Danish), HT Harris (Italian Delicatessen), Sergios (Italian Cafe), Shikara (North Indian) and the Riding House Fitzrovia.

== Designation ==
It was designated a Conservation Area in 1982.
