= Samuel Beazley =

British architect and writer

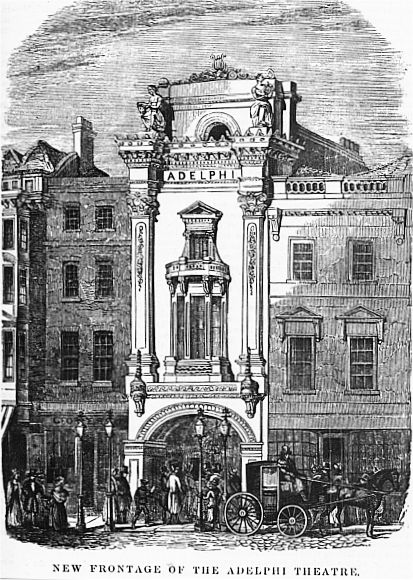
Beazley's façade for the Adelphi Theatre, 1840

Samuel Beazley (1786–1851) was an English architect, novelist, and playwright. He became the leading theatre architect of his time and the first notable English expert in that field.

After fighting in the Peninsular War, Beazley returned to London and quickly became a successful architect. He combined this with writing more than a hundred theatre works, generally in a comic style. He is best remembered as a theatre architect, with two major London theatres of his still surviving, together with the well-known façade of another, but he was also an important figure in railway architecture, with many commissions in the southeast of England.

Beazley's other activities included translating opera libretti into English, and writing novels and non-fictional works on architecture. He was also a participant in the Berners Street hoax.

== Biography ==
=== Early years and Berners Street hoax ===
Beazley was born in Westminster, the son of Samuel Beazley, (Note: The 1885 article on Beazley in the Dictionary of National Biography states that Beazley's father was an architect and surveyor; The current ODNB article states that Beazley senior was "an army accoutrement maker".) and his wife Ann (née Frith). Both facets of Beazley's future career were displayed when he was still a boy: at school at Acton, aged 12, he wrote a farce and constructed the stage on which he and his schoolfriends performed it. At this age he already showed "signs of considerable taste for Art and a dramatic talent", according to a tribute in the Journal of the Society of Architects. He was trained as an architect by his uncle Charles Beazley, "the architect of the much admired Church at Feversham".

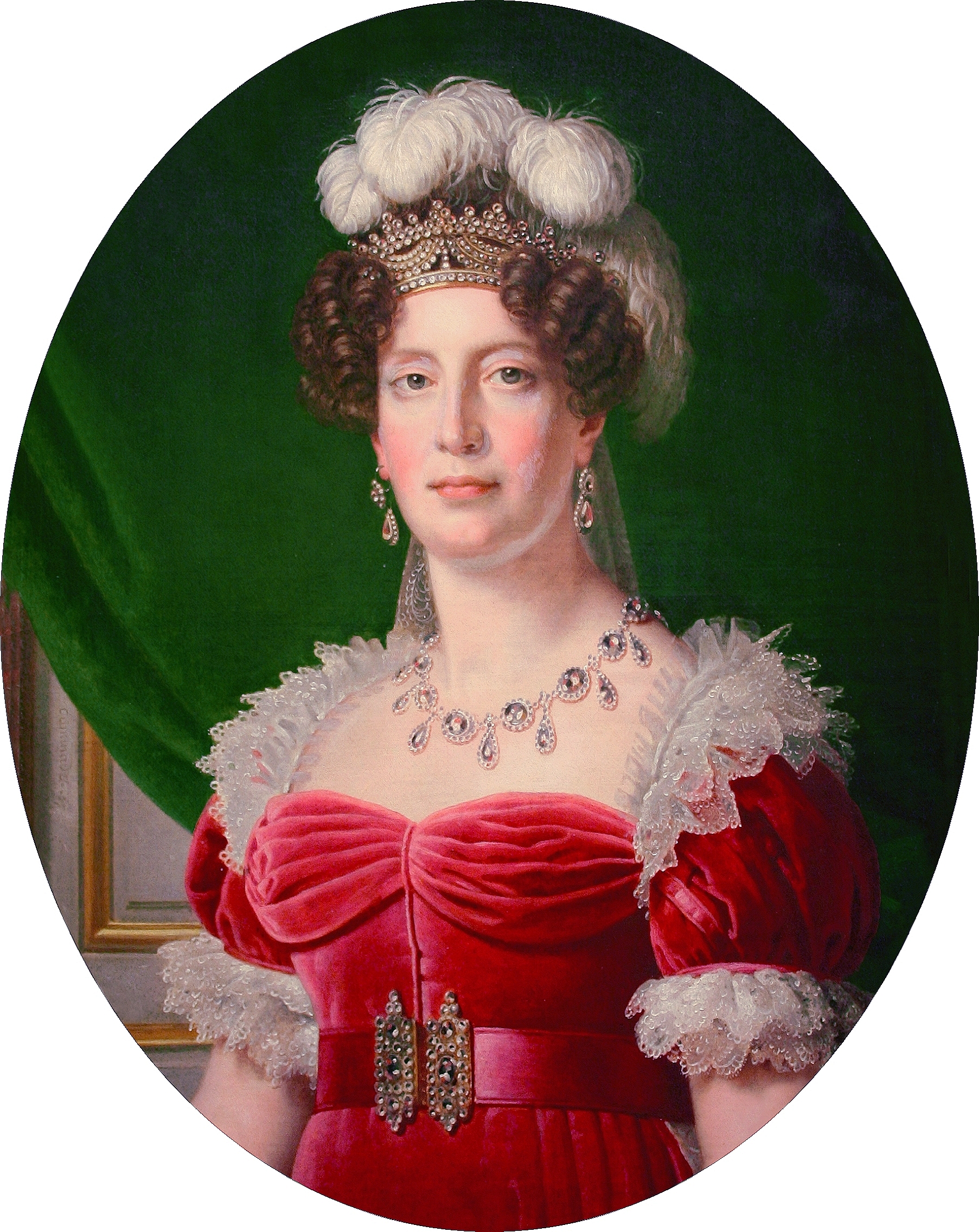
The Duchesse d'Angoulême

As a youth, Beazley volunteered for service in the Peninsular War, in Spain, and experienced many adventures, which he was fond of relating in later life to his friends. Among these, according to his account, was being found unconscious and taken for dead, waking up to find himself laid out for burial. Another was his part in the daring escape to Spain of Duchesse d'Angoulême, daughter of Louis XVI, fleeing from Napoleon's forces in 1815. His account of the escape was published by his daughter after his death.

In 1810, Beazley made a bet with his friend, Theodore Hook, over whether Hook could transform any house in London into the most talked-about address in a week. This became known as the Berners Street Hoax, in which Hook sent out thousands of letters in the name of the resident at 54 Berners Street, requesting deliveries, visitors and assistance. Hundreds of persons – including tradesmen, doctors, lawyers, priests, the Governor of the Bank of England, the Duke of York, the Archbishop of Canterbury, and the Lord Mayor of the City of London – arrived at the address on 27 November.

=== Architect and playwright ===
After returning to London, Beazley practised as an architect and, at the same time, wrote plays. He had already had a work professionally produced at the Theatre Royal English Opera, Lyceum in 1811: The Boarding House; or, Five Hours at Brighton, a musical farce in two acts. In 1816 he designed a new theatre for the site, in which one of the first productions was his operetta Is he Jealous? A reviewer wrote, "It is a translation from the French by Mr. Beazley, and a most entertaining little thing it is. We have seen nothing for a long time that has pleased us so much." For the same theatre, Beazley wrote the short operetta Fire and Water in 1817; it was revived on numerous occasions over the next three years. "The business of this piece is made up of the scheme of a petulant old man, who proposes to marry a young lady, and of the efforts of a rattle brained young lover to baffle him and to carry off the prize."

Beazley continued to write for the stage, producing more than a hundred comedies, farces, comic operas, and operettas. In 1829 he wrote The Elephant of Siam and the Fire Fiend, presenting a famous female elephant called Madame D'Jeck, showing off the tricks she could perform. The historian John Earl notes that the elephant, rather than the author, took a curtain call. (Note: The Morning Post reported, "After the dropping of the curtain, a general cry was raised of Elephant! Elephant! and accordingly out she came, unattended. … She knelt on her forelegs, bowed gracefully with her proboscis, and retired amidst the universal acclamation from all parts of the house.") Among Beazley's other works were Gretna Green, The Steward, Old Customs, The Lottery Ticket, My Uncle, Bachelors' Wives, Hints to Husbands and The Bull's Head.

Beazley also translated opera librettos, including Robert le diable, Caterina Cornaro and La sonnambula. The last is said to have been adapted by Beazley to fit the English pronunciation of the opera star Maria Malibran during a series of morning interviews with her at her bedside.

=== London theatres and other work ===
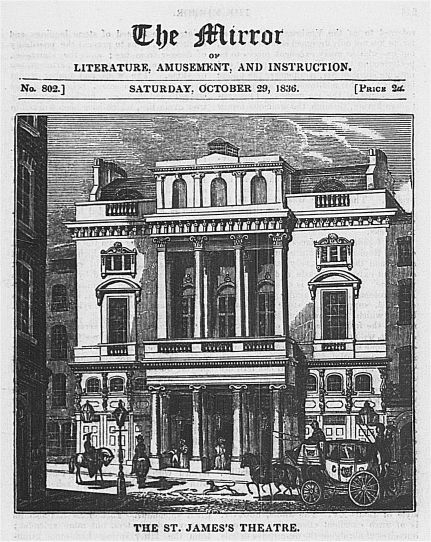
Beazley's St James's Theatre in 1836

Beazley designed the Lyceum Theatre twice. His 1816 building, then known as the English Opera House, was destroyed by fire in 1830, and Beazley provided the designs for its replacement, which opened in 1834. He also designed the St James's Theatre, the City of London Theatre in Norton Folgate (both in the 1830s) and the Royalty Theatre in 1840. Major additions to existing theatres included the Strand front of the Adelphi Theatre, and the Russell Street colonnade of the Drury Lane Theatre (1831), among many others. In 1820 he was responsible for the rebuilding of the Theatre Royal in Birmingham, which had been destroyed by fire. He also designed two theatres for Dublin, two for Belgium, one for Brazil, and two for different parts of India.

Beazley's biographer, G. W. Burnet, wrote in 1885, "Without presenting much artistic attraction, his theatres possessed the merit of being well adapted to their purposes." Earl added, "[Beazley's] theatre designs were invariably neo-classical and not strikingly innovative; he drew on European architectural precedents but adapted them skilfully. … His experience as a playwright and his intimate knowledge of the physical demands of dramatic presentation gave him a significant advantage over his rivals." Beazley's non-theatre work included several buildings in Leamington Spa, Ashford Town Hall, and Studley Castle in Warwickshire. His last important works were for the South-Eastern Railway Company, and include its terminus at London Bridge, most of its stations on the North Kent line, and the Lord Warden Hotel and Pilot House at Dover.

In addition to his architecture and playwriting, Beazley wrote two novels, The Roué, 1828, and The Oxonians, 1830. In Burnet's view, they are cleverly constructed, but "to modern taste they seem tedious and formal." He also wrote some architectural papers and a short book published in 1812 about the enclosure of waste lands. His versatility caused him to be nicknamed "the Vanbrugh of his time: for he has not only designed several theatres, but has written many excellent pieces to be performed in them." Earl agreed, describing Vanbrugh and Beazley as "soldiers, adventurers, playwrights, and architects."

=== Personal life ===
Beazley was married three times: first in 1809 to Eliza Richardson, second in 1824 to Frances Conway, and third in the late 1840s to Marianne Joseph. His first two marriages ended in divorce. In his will, Beazley divided the bulk of his considerable fortune between his third wife, Marianne, and his sister Emily Beazley. He made further bequests to the children of his sister Nancy, wife of Edward Tribe. In codicils, he also made provision for children in the care of several different women.

Beazley died suddenly at his home, Tonbridge Castle, Kent, on 13 October 1851, aged 65. He was buried at Bermondsey Old Church, London. Many years earlier he had composed his own epitaph:

Here lies Samuel Beazley,
Who lived hard and died easily

He was remembered by the playwright J. R. Planché as "Dear, good-tempered, clever, generous, eccentric Sam Beazley."

== Notes and references ==
Notes

== Bibliography ==
- Earl, John; Michael Sell (2000). Guide to British Theatres 1750-1950. London: Theatres Trust. ISBN 0-7136-5688-3.
- Heathcote, Edwin (1986). Theatre London: An Architectural Guide. London: Batsford. ISBN 1-84166-047-7.
