= Mademoiselle D'Jeck =

French show elephant

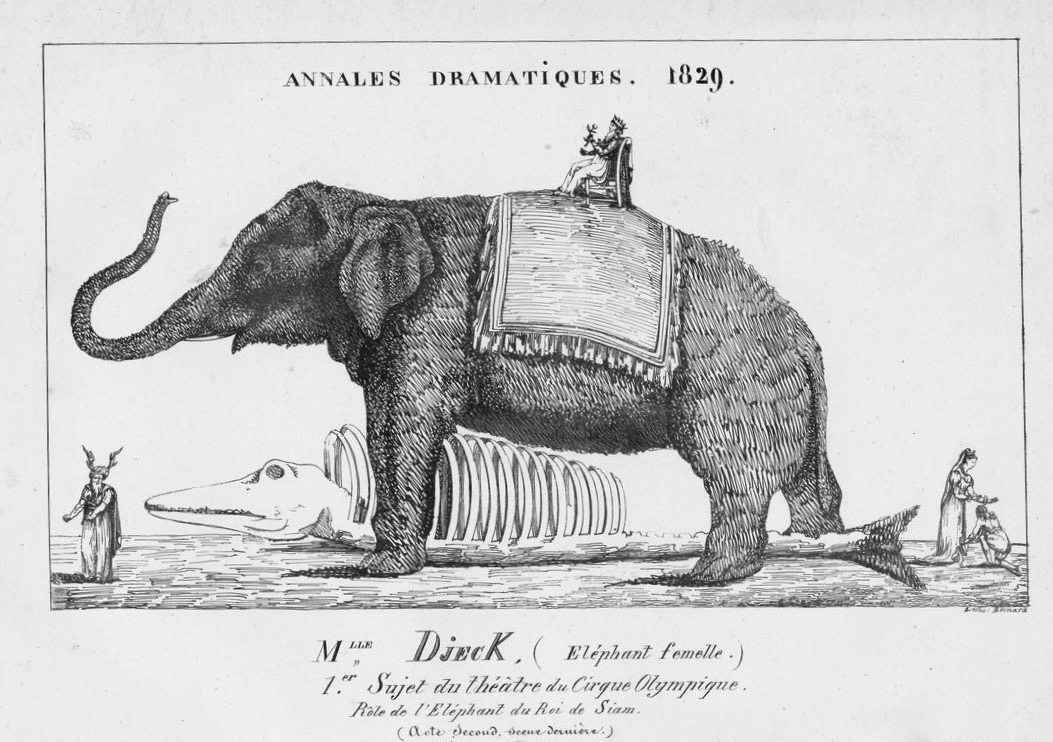
Mademoiselle D'jeck (Annales dramatiques, 1829).

Mademoiselle D'Jeck (died 1837) (also D'Jick, Djeck, Djek, D'jek, D'Geck or other varied spellings) was a celebrated elephant who performed in Europe and the United States.

== Theatrical career ==
D'Jeck first created a sensation in July 1829 in Paris, where she appeared at the Cirque Olympique of Antonio Franconi in a piece entitled l'éléphant du Roi de Siam (Elephant of the King of Siam) by Léopold Chandezon and Ferdinand Laloue. She was then engaged, via menagerie owner Stephen Polito and Edward Cross, by Frederick Henry Yates of the Adelphi Theatre in London, where she debuted on December 3, 1829. This play was titled The Elephant of Siam and the Fire Fiend and credited to Samuel Beazley and John Gallot (Gallott?), though it may be largely a translation of the French play. D'Jeck remained at the Adelphi through early April before traveling around England. John Gallott was an actor at the Haymarket and Coburg Theatres, and ultimately became prompter at the old Adelphi.

D'Jeck then traveled to America and debuted at the Bowery Theatre in New York in January 1831, where she had a three-week stand, a very long run for a play at the time. John Gallot (Gallott?) was billed throughout America as D'Jecks handler and owner. At the Arch Theatre in Philadelphia, the rival Chestnut Theatre brought an unsuccessful lawsuit over who would have the right to show the animal. She returned to England in July 1831.

The play featured all the tricks the elephant could perform. The historian John Earl notes that the elephant, rather than the author, took a curtain call. The Morning Post reported, "After the dropping of the curtain, a general cry was raised of Elephant! Elephant! and accordingly out she came, unattended. … She knelt on her forelegs, bowed gracefully with her proboscis, and retired amidst the universal acclamation from all parts of the house."

The 1858 novelette Jack of All Trades by Charles Reade is based on D'Jeck and her keeper, violin-maker John Lott.

== Incidents and death ==
In August 1830, while traveling through Morpeth in northeast England, D'Jeck killed one of her keepers. This is likely in response to abuse, though whether D'Jeck had a violent nature or was responding to harsh treatment can be the subject of debate. The resulting court proceedings brought much fanfare, but D'Jeck was let off with a small fine. In 2013, the local November Club theatre group produced a play, Dr Mullins’ Anatomy of the Theatre Royal, based on this story.

D'Jeck was also involved in a number of other incidents where she reportedly harmed people, in England and continental Europe. One summary from 1882 states that after returning to England from America, "she half-killed a baker. Going to France, she killed another man at Bordeaux. At another place she broke her keeper's arm in two places. In Bavaria, she set her shed on fire."

Eventually, D'Jeck was shot to death with a circus cannon (after shooting her with rifles was not successful) in June 1837 in Geneva, reportedly for breaking a priest's ribs. Her meat was sold for eating.

== See also ==
- List of individual elephants
