= Penny Penates =

Penny Penates postcard used in a public postal system

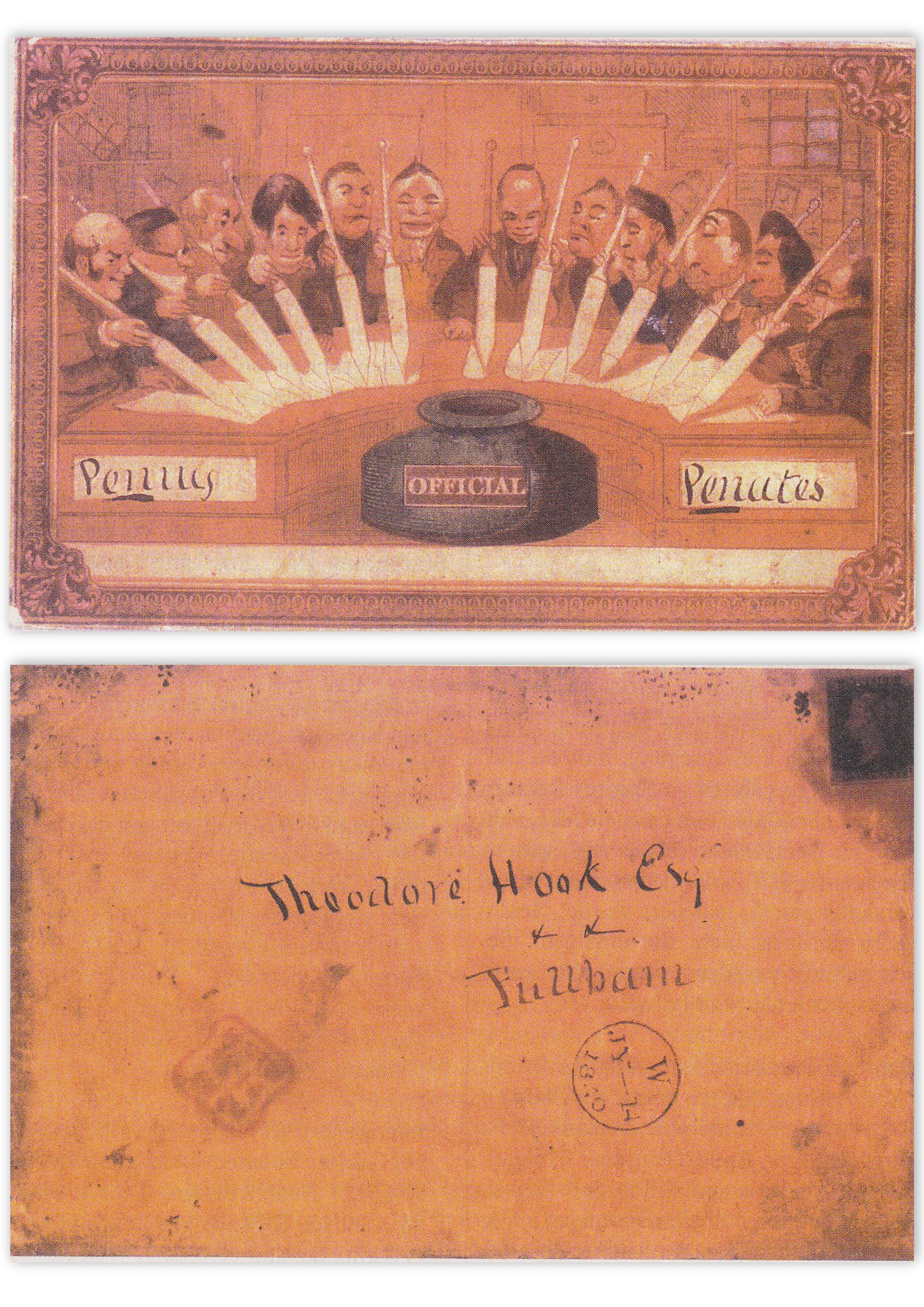
- Artist: Theodore Hook
- Year: 1840
- Type: Watercolour
- Medium: paper
- Location: Riga, Latvia

The Penny Penates is a postcard that was posted on 14 July 1840 to Fulham in London. It was addressed to the writer and practical joker Theodore Hook, who was probably also its sender and artist. The hand-painted design on the postcard shows an image of post office clerks sitting around a giant ink well.

The postcard was discovered in 2001 by a stamp dealer while he was examining a stamp collection, and verified by the British Philatelic Association's expert committee as genuine and the world's oldest known postcard. It is also the only known surviving example of a Penny Black stamp, the world's first adhesive postage stamp, used on a postcard. It was sold at auction in 2002 for £31,750, the most ever paid for a postcard.

== Design ==
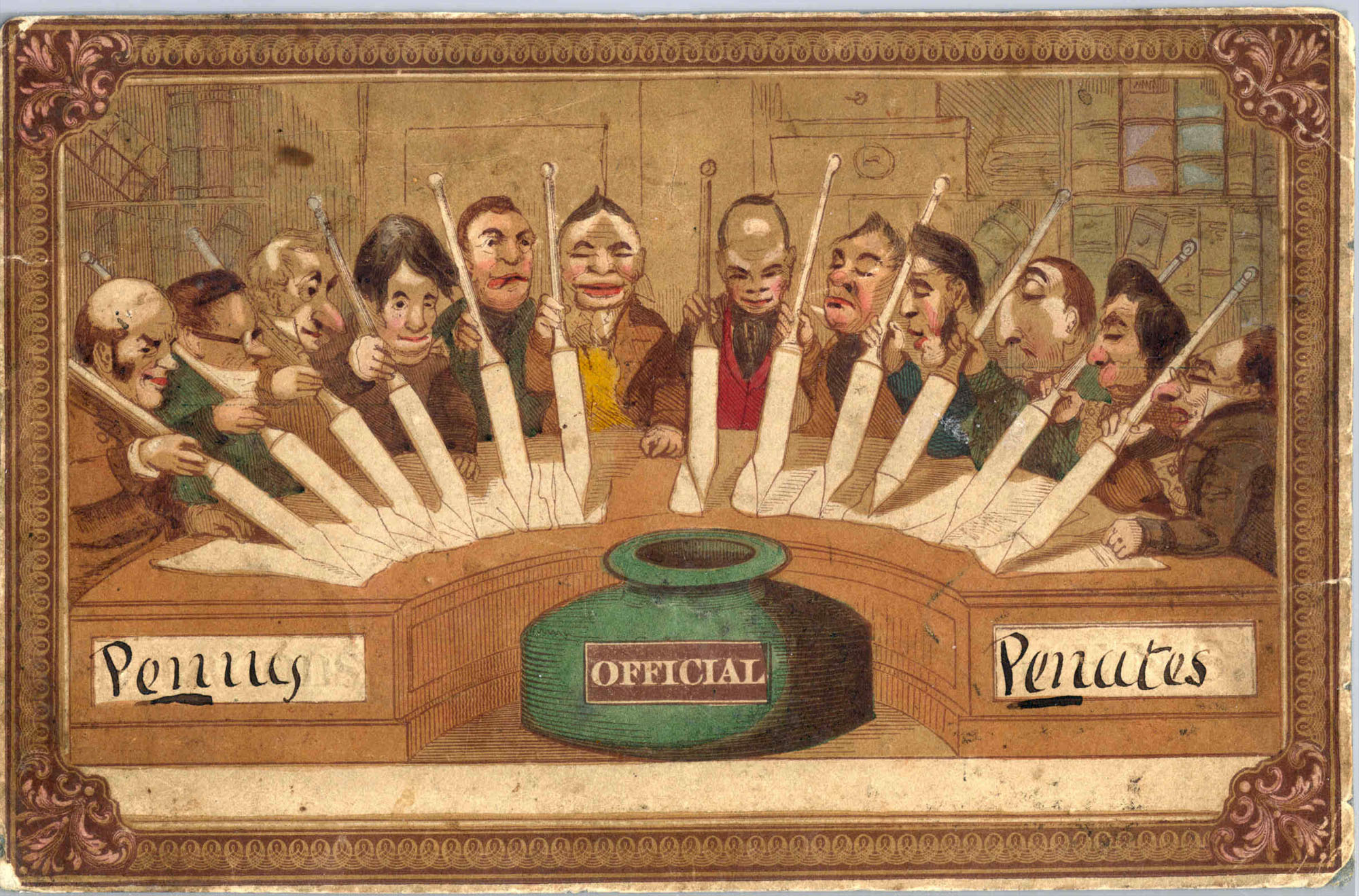
Penny Penates postcard front face painting

The Penny Penates is a postcard made of paper. The front features a hand-drawn colour illustration showing a gathering of caricatured postal clerks with huge pens seated around an enlarged inkwell marked "Official". To the left and right of the inkwell appear the words "Penny" and "Penates", respectively. In Ancient Roman religion, the Penates were the guardians of a storeroom or household. On the back is inscribed "Theodore Hook Esq, Fulham"; a Penny Black stamp is affixed to the top right as postage. A circular postmark underneath the Fulham address is dated 14 July 1840.

== History ==
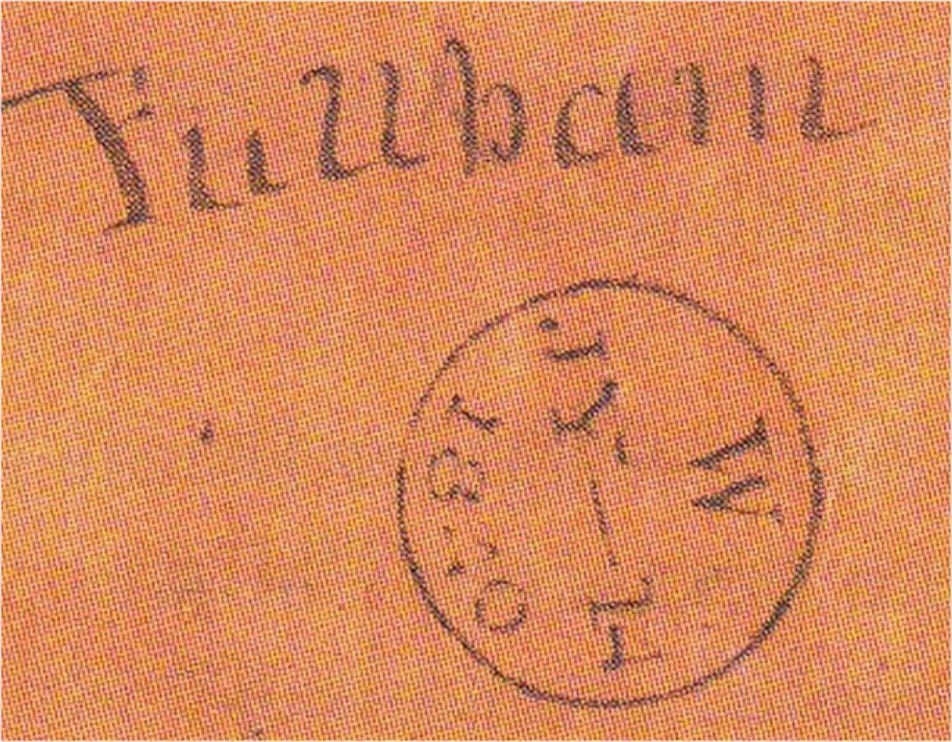
Back with Fulham address, and 14 July 1840, postmark

The Penny Penates postcard was mailed to Theodore Hook—probably by himself—from London to Fulham, England, on 14 July 1840. Hook presumably intended the card as a humorous practical joke poking fun at the postal workers who would have processed it.

In 2001 an expert discovered the postcard in a stamp collection and, putting together the sequence of historical events, realised that it had likely been made and mailed by Hook. It sold at auction for £31,750 in March 2002, which postal historian Edward Proud said was the most ever paid for a postcard. The winning bid was made by telephone by postcard collector Eugene Gomberg from Riga, Latvia.

== Significance ==
The postcard has been verified by the British Philatelic Association's expert committee as being genuine and the world's oldest. Up to that time it was believed the concept of the postcard had been invented in the United States, Germany, or Austria. Twentieth-century postcard collectors thought the first postcards were made some twenty years later, in the 1860s. The Penny Penates is also the only known postcard with a Penny Black stamp—the world's oldest self-adhesive postage stamp, normally used just for letters. First issued 1 May 1840, the Penny Black stamp was changed to a red-brown version a year later because the red ink used for cancelling the black stamp could be easily washed off and the stamp reused without additional payment.

British postal protocol for postcards designated through tradition that no part of a message could be put on the address side of it. The address side could contain only the sender's name, address, and return request if it could not be delivered. The address side with the postage stamp of a postcard was considered the front side. A committee of the British Post Office in 1896 recommended that this custom be discontinued. A rule in 1899 was put in place that there no longer would be instructions determining the tradition be followed.
