= The London Edition =

Hotel in London

Coordinates: 51°31′00″N 0°08′10″W

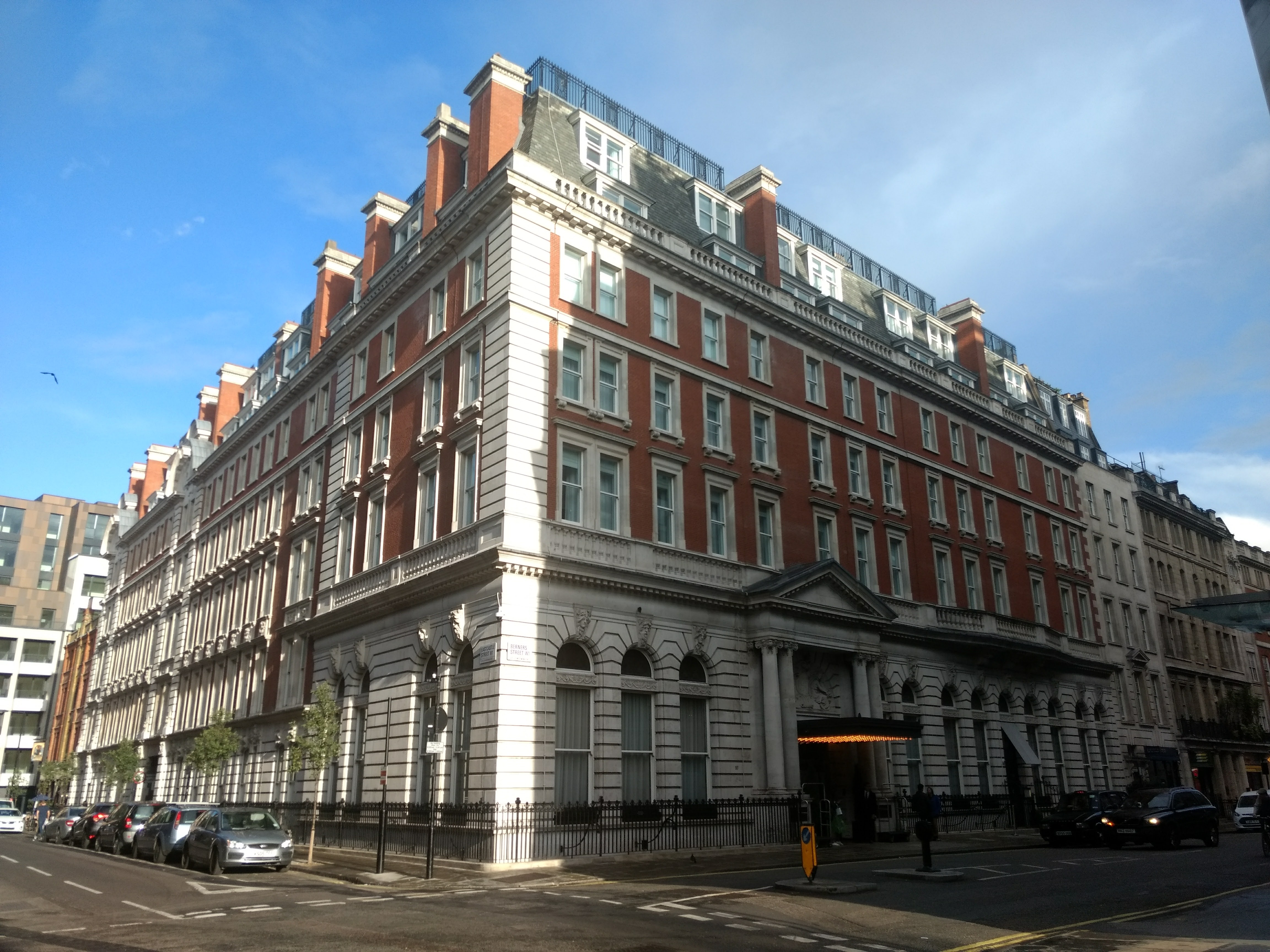
The London EDITION, 2017

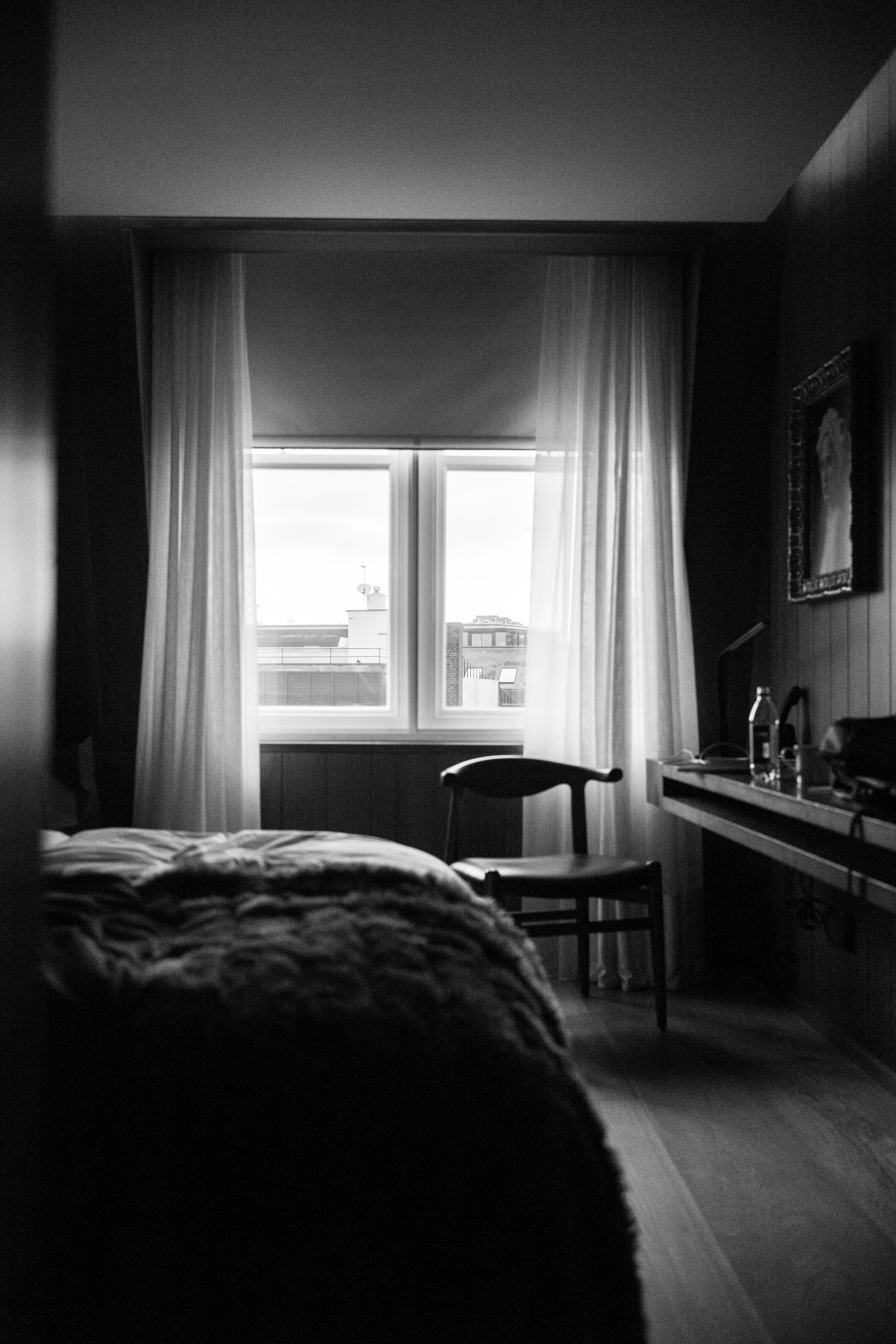
Room at The London EDITION

The London Edition is a luxury hotel, formerly known as the Berners Hotel, located in Berners Street in the City of Westminster, London.

== History ==
The Berners Hotel was built in 1908–10, designed by John Slater, surveyor to the Berners Estate. It is a grade II listed building.

The hotel was owned by Park Plaza Hotels & Resorts and operated as the Berners Park Plaza Hotel throughout the 1990s, until it was sold to JJW Hotels and Resorts in 2001 and returned to its historic name. The hotel closed in 2006 for renovations, which were begun but never completed, after the property went bankrupt in August 2010. The Berners Hotel was acquired by Marriott Hotels in November 2010, and the new owners announced it would be renovated and branded as one of their Edition Hotels. The hotel reopened as The London Edition in September 2013, with interiors designed by Yabu Pushelberg. Marriott sold the hotel, along with two other corporate-owned Edition hotels, to the Abu Dhabi Investment Authority for $815 million in January 2014, though Marriott continues to manage the property.
