= Di Penates =

Household deities in ancient Roman religion

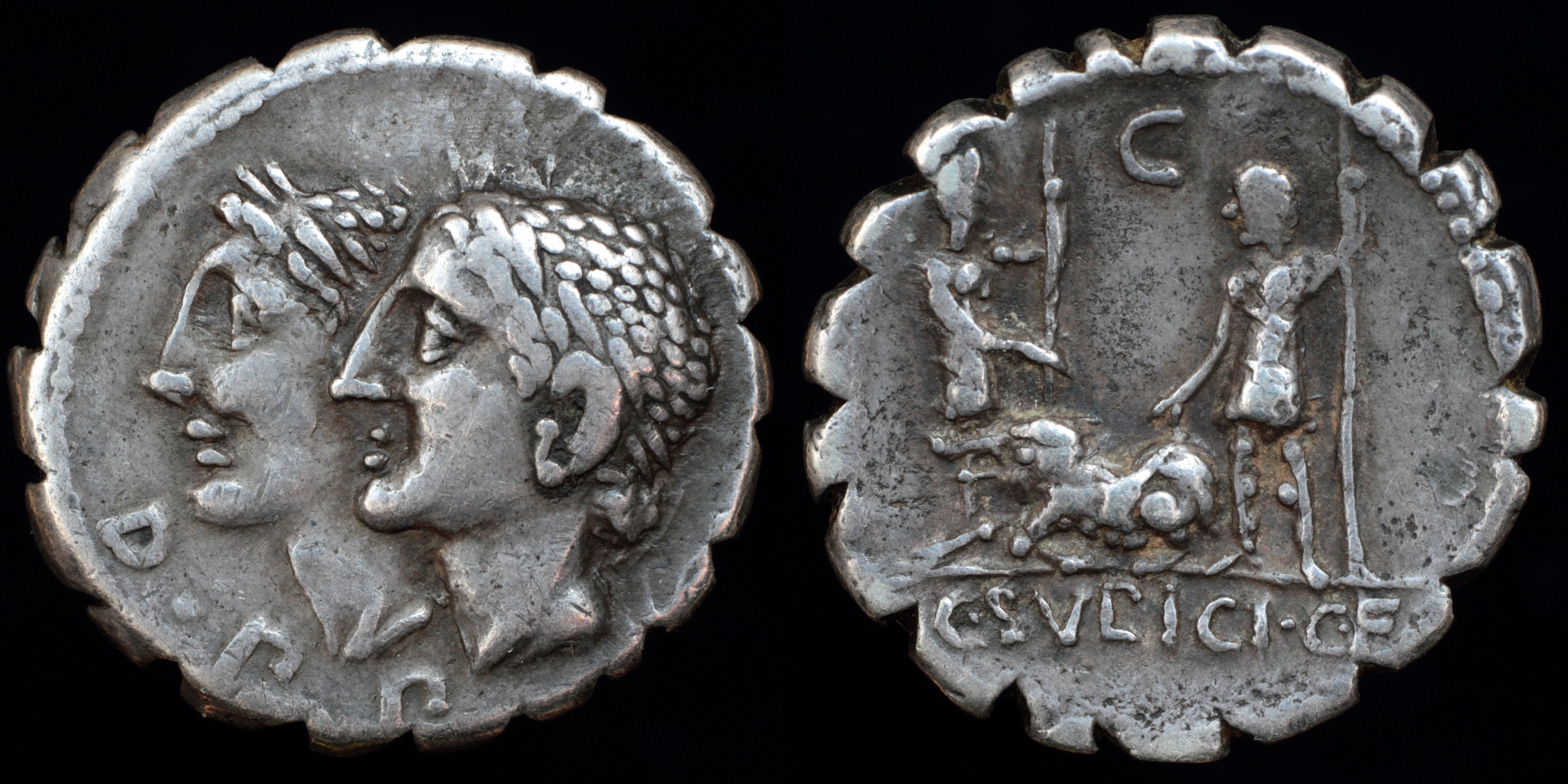

First side of the image: O: Two jugate heads of Di Penates Publici D · P · P
Second side of the image: R: Soldiers with spears pointing at lying sow C·SV(LP)ICI·C·F
Reverse depicts scene from Aeneid. According to the prophecy, in the place where a white sow casts 30 piglets under an oak tree, a new city shall be built (Lavinium); also, a new city called after the white sow shall be built by Ascanius 30 years later (Alba Longa).

Silver serrate denarius struck by C. Sulpicius C. f. Galba in Rome 106 BC.

ref.: Sulpicia 1., Sydenham 572., Crawford 312/1

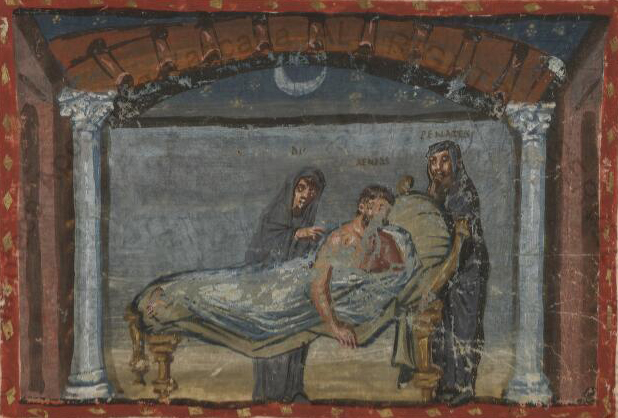
Aeneas and the Penates, from a 4th-century manuscript

In ancient Roman religion, the Di Penates (Latin: [ˈdiː pɛˈnaːteːs]) or Penates (English: /pɪˈneɪtiːz/ pin-AY-teez) were among the dii familiares, or household deities, invoked most often in domestic rituals. When the family had a meal, they threw a bit into the fire on the hearth for the Penates. They were thus associated with Vesta, the Lares, and the Genius of the pater familias in the "little universe" of the domus.

Like other domestic deities, the Penates had a public counterpart.

== Function ==
The 1st-century BCE Roman statesman Cicero etymologizes the Penates in his work De natura deorum ("On the Nature of the Gods"), according to which their name derives either from Latin penus—a storeroom for food—or from penitus ("deep within"), because they reside in the innermost part of the house, on which basis the poets supposedly also called them penetrales. On the basis of the former etymology, it could theoretically be presumed that the Penates were merely tutelary deities of the storeroom and they guarded the household's food, wine, oil, and other supplies. The classicist William Warde Fowler, the Penates, alongside the goddess Vesta, served as guardians of the "material vitality" of the household—they protected the material needs of any given family. Fowler contrasts this role with that of the Genius, which was—according to Fowler—connected with the continuity of the family. According to Fowler, the plurality of the Penates is perhaps reflective of the ever-changing nature of the particular food items contained within any family's storeroom.

According to the classicist Laurie Porstner, that the Penates were more than mere protectors of the storeroom is indicated by the prominence within Roman religion. They are the most frequently discussed type of household god, with over 380 mentions in all of Latin literature, in contrast to the 216 references to the Lares and 74 mentions of the Genius. Moreover, the Menologium Rusticum Colotianum records a sacrifice to the Penates alongside important Roman festivals, such as Saturnalia. Porstner argues that it, should the Penates have merely been gods of the storeroom, they would most likely have only ever been propitiated with domestic offerings, and they would not have required a public celebration, especially not one prominent enough to feature on such a "large and expensive monument." In this particular case, Porstner suggests that the holiday referred to on the monument is to be identified with the Compitalia, for the Lares Compitales should number amongst the Penates if they broadly included any type of household deity.

The word penus, which—in Cicero's time—only ever referred to a storeroom for provisions, seemingly had another meaning preserved in the writings of the 2nd-century grammarian Festus, who defines the term as "the most secret site in the shrine of Vesta, which is surrounded by curtains." The 1st-century historian Tacitus, regarding this same point, writes that the Penates of the Roman people (Penates Publici Populi Romani) were stored in the Temple of Vesta in the Forum. Other authors also affirm a connection between the Penates and Vesta, the goddess of the hearth, with Cicero explicitly stating that "not far from this divine function [of Vesta] are the Penates" ("Nec longe absunt ab hac vi di"). Moreover, the 4th-century author Servius the Grammarian writes that Vesta was either one of the Penates or merely an associate of them ("utrum Vesta etiam de numero penatium sit, an comes eorum accipiatur"). Likewise, Macrobius—a 5th-century historian—states that Vesta is either one of the Penates or one of their companions.

In regard to religious ritual, Servius connects the Penates to the hearth, stating that "the hearth is their altar." Horace, a 1st-century BCE poet, described sacrifices of "pious grain" ("farre pio") and "sputtering salt" ("saliente mica") on these altars so as to appease angered Penates. However, within the context of the passage, this sacrifice was only to be offered by the poor as a substitute for a more expensive offering of a sow. Other sources do describe the sacrifice of a sow to the Penates at Lavinium, which probably connects to a legend wherein a sacrificial sow guides Aeneas to the site where he builds the city of Lavinium. Cicero describes the consecration of homes to the Lares Familiares and the Penates, implicitly comparing the worship of the two entities. Within the Aeneid, Anchises "humbly" ("supplex") performs a sacrifice to the "Lar of Troy" ("Pergameumque Larem") and to the penetralia of "hoary Vesta" ("canae Vestae") utilizing his "pious grain" ("farre pio") and full box of incense ("plena ... acerra"). In another section of the same poem, Virgil describes the character of Ascanius swearing by the "great Penates" ("magnos ... penatis"), the "Lar of Assaracus" ("Assaracique larem"), and the penetralia of "hoary Vesta" ("canae penetralia Vestae"). Sacrifices to the Penates—in the Aeneid—are connected with hospitality, for Evander and Aeneas both perform a joint sacrifice to the Penates and the Lar.

Within the Aeneid, an altar of the Penates appears near the throne of King Priam, presumably as a Romanization of the shrine to Zeus Herkeios ("Zeus of the household") by which Priam was slain in Greek mythology. In the scene, following the fall of Troy, Hecuba—the wife of Priam—and her daughters, crowed around the altar and cling onto the Penates, believing that it will protect them. The connection between the Penates and the household was evidently strong, for some authors utilize the word metonymically to refer to one's home. When the 1st-century historian Tacitus describes the homelike atmosphere of a military camp for its soldiers, he emphasizes that legionaries come to love their camps as they do their household gods ("in modum Penatium"). In another passage, Tacitus describes the soldiers of Vespasian (r. 69–79), during their takeover of the city of Rome, seeking to assault the enemy camp even though the rest of the city had fallen, out of a belief that "the particular honor of the soldier is in the camp, that is his fatherland, those are his Penates." Livy, a 1st-century BCE historian, similarly describes the military camp as like "another fatherland" ("patria altera") for the soldiers, stating that their tents house their Penates.

In Roman literature, the destruction of one's Penates is sometimes used to describe the demolition of one's house. For example, Cicero—when describing the destruction of his house at the hands of Clodius—emphasizes that the "lovely Liberty of yours drove out [his] di Penates and familiares Lares, so she could settle herself" in his house. Cicero continues, declaring that "what is more holy, more fortified by every sort of numinous awe, than the domus of every individual citizen? Here are his altars, his hearth, his di Penates; here are located his rites, ceremonies, and observances; here for all men is a refuge so inviolate that it is sacrilege for anyone to be torn away from it." Valerius Maximus, a 1st-century author, likewise—whilst describing the destruction of the homes of Marcus Flaccus and Lucius Saturninus—writes that their Penates were torn from the fundaments ("penates ab imis fundamentis eruti sunt") to mean that the houses were razed to their foundations.

Macrobius reports that Varro, in his book Human Antiquities, had failed to adequately describe the Penates, but "those who dig out truth more diligently" had stated that "the Penates are those through whom we breathe in our inner core (penitus), through whom we have a body, through whom we possess a rational mind." However, it is possible that the explanation attributed to these more diligent authors is actually ultimately from Varro, for nearly the same account appears in a set of scholia on the commentaries on Virgil by Servius the Grammarian, implying that both Macrobius and this scholiast had a common source. In any case, Macrobius's source for this information lists Juno, Jupiter, and Minerva—the Capitoline triad—amongst the Penates, stating that Jupiter is the middle aether, Juno the earth and the lowest part of the air, and Minerva the highest part of the aether. If the source was indeed Varro, then it perhaps stems not from a desire to faithfully record archaic Roman religion, but instead a desire to demonstrate how Roman theological concepts reflected philosophical truths. In the Varronian model, the Capitoline triad—the three most prominent deities of Roman religion—would represent the fundamental structure of reality.

=== As miniature statues ===
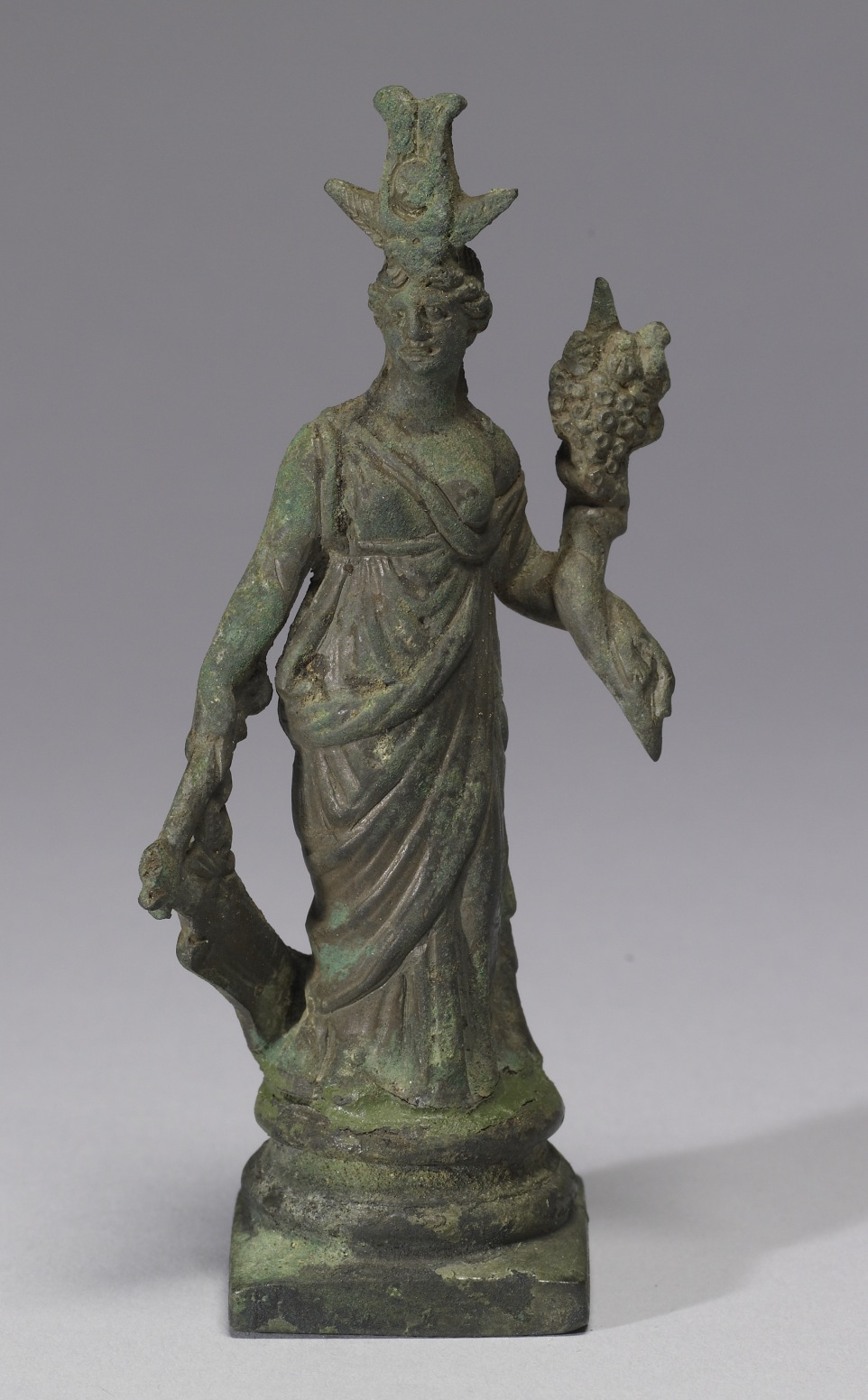
Statuettes of Isis-Fortuna from Pompeii

Servius the Grammarian states that the Penates were "all the gods that are cultivated at home" ("'penates' sunt omnes dii, qui domi coluntur"), on which basis the historian Robert Parker concludes that the Penates were simply any set of domestic gods chosen by the pater familias, and they thus varied across each household. In accordance with this interpretation, numerous depictions of various separate deities have been discovered in the lararia of Pompeii. The Penates were primarily worshipped in the form of sets of statuettes, typically composed of bronze, silver, or precious stone. Virgil, in the Aeneid, explicitly describes the Penates as if they were "sacred images of the gods" ("effigies sacrae divum"). Virgil provides further descriptions regarding the physical appearance of these effigies: They are said to have veiled heads ("velatasque comas").

These figurines were expressly designed to imitate cult statues—they are often stylistically reminiscent of famous cult statues from the Greek world, such as the Artemis of Ephesus, Zeus of Olympia, or Aphrodite of Knidos. In fact, they even feature the bases found on cult statues, and thus—according to the archaeologist Alexandra Sofronview—they can be understood not as an attempt to represent the deity themselves, but instead to represent the cult image. There was great diversity amongst the types of gods that could have been represented by these statues; houses could varyingly include local provincial deities or Egyptian deities. In Pompeii, there are thirty-four known deities that were found honored as Penates in lararia. However, ultimately, deities such as Mercury, Venus, Jupiter, and Hercules were the most popular deities found in household shrines. Sometimes, there are multiple statuettes portraying the same deity, such as one hoard from Boscoreale which contains two separate representations of Isis-Fortuna, shown holding a rudder and a cornucopia. To explain this phenomenon, Sofronview suggests that any particular household's Penates might combine that of the husband and the wife's families, noting that the 1st-century BCE Roman author Propertius describes a boy relinquishing his bulla in front of his "mother's gods" ("matris ... deos").

== Public Penates ==
=== Connection with the Dioscuri and Great Gods ===
The Penates of Rome (Penates Publici Populi Romani) had a temple on the Velia near the Palatine. Dionysius of Halicarnassus says it housed statues of two youths in the archaic style. Varro, as cited by Servius the Grammarian, supposedly saw an inscription on the base of a statue—presumably referring to statues in this temple—containing the text MAGNIS DIS, on which basis Varro concluded that these Di Magni ("Great Gods") and the Penates were one and the same. Servius continues to explain that the Di Magni include Jupiter, Juno, Minerva, and Mercury. Dionysius of Halicarnassus, a 1st-century BCE Greek historian, provides further details on the statue within this temple, stating that it depicted two youths clad in military equipment and that it identified these figures as the Penates. Dionysius aims to syncretize these Penates with the Great Gods of Samothrace, who themselves had been identified in antiquity with the Dioscuri. Macrobius states that an individual Tarquinius, the son of Demaratus of Corinth, assembled the three gods Jupiter, Juno, and Minerva in the temple at Samothrace. These three gods are, supposedly according to a scholar named Cassius Hemina, to be identified with the Penates.

In the Aeneid, the connection with Samothrace is downplayed, though still present. Virgil writes that Dardanus was born in Italy but stopped at Samothrace and Mount Ida whilst traveling to Troy, and he also—at several points—mentions in connection with the Penates the "Great Gods" ("Magni Di") associated with Samothrace. According to Stehle, the Great Gods symbolize "old and new," capturing both the Greek and Roman sides of the myth. Virgil chooses to emphasize a version of the Dardanus myth wherein he was actually a descendant of the Italian king Corythus and only later migrated to Asia Minor. According to this interpretation, Aeneas—a descendant of Dardanus—would have actually been returning to his ancestral homeland in Italy. However, Virgil does not describe the Penates as originating in Italy, only Dardanus. According to the classicist Alessandro Barchiesi, the Penates are, in fact, explicitly not treated as native Italian divinities in the Aeneid, but instead as foreign imports that become Italian through migration.

It is not clear exactly why the association with the Dioscuri came about, though it is known that many Republican families closely connected to the Velia shrine originated in Tusculum, itself a prominent center for worship of the Dioscuri. On this basis, the classicist Robert B. Lloyd suggests that the shrine at Velia was perhaps originally founded by individuals from Tusculum and was once a shrine to the Dioscuri. Since those gods already had a larger and more importance temple in the Forum, the Velian shrine was—according to Lloyd—likely relegated to a minor role, perhaps one more suited for private cult. Lloyd further suggests that, due to its relative insignificance, this particular cult of the Dioscuri was easily subsumed by a more prominent cult—in this case, that of the Penates. Alternatively, the classicist Kathryn Milne suggests that the Dioscuri were likely invoked to be the Penates accompanying armies on campaign, for the divine twins were otherwise connected to the military and believed to aid soldiers.

In any case, at several points in the Aeneid, Virgil mentions the specific phrase "penatibus et magnis dis" ("the Penates and the great gods"), which is metrically unusual for Virgil, as it creates a line with a spondaic and monosyllabic ending. Both spondees and monosyllabic endings are incredibly rare in Virgil, and nowhere else do they appear together, leading Lloyd to conclude that they must have been borrowed from another source, likely one that is non-poetic. In particular, Lloyd suggests that it was borrowed from the inscription at the Velian temple. According to Lloyd, the growing popularity of the Aeneas legend in the 3rd and 2nd centuries BCE would have led to the shrine at Velia, being the only public shrine to the Penates in Rome, becoming identified with the cult of the Penates supposedly established by Aeneas.

=== Connection with Aeneas and Lavinium ===
Varro records that a white ("alba") sow had escaped from Aeneas's ship and traveled to Lavinium, where it then gave birth to a litter of thirty piglets, and—on account of this prodigy—the city of Alba Longa was named as such. Dionysius of Halicarnassus recounts the same story, albeit in greater detail. He states that Aeneas had begun the preparations for the sacrifice of a sow, but—as the priests were performing the initial rites—the sow broke free and ran off. Aeneas supposedly followed the sow, believing it to be the four-footed guide prophesized for him by the oracle. The sow proceeded to travel about twenty-four stades from the sea, before laying down on account of exhaustion. Aeneas believed that this area had been set out for him and his future city by the prophecy, though—considering the poor quality of the land—he briefly considered heading elsewhere. The initially distraught Aeneas was given counsel by some divine entity instructed Aeneas to wait as many years as the sow had children, after which point the land would become fertile and prosperous. According to Dionysius, in one version, the aforementioned divine being took the form of an incorporeal voice and it spoke to Aeneas whilst he was pondering whether to leave, whereas—in other versions—the advice was delivered by a divinity that approached Aeneas in a dream, after he retreated to his camp in despair upon seeing the poor quality of the land. According to Valerius Maximus, Aeneas settled the Penates ("penetrales deos") in Lavinium, where they remained until Ascanius, the son of Aeneas, moved them to Alba Longa. Supposedly, the Penates—of their own volition—returned to Lavinium, and, upon being brought back to Alba once more, they again returned themselves to Lavinium, making it clear that Lavinium was their chosen residence.

It is likely that the Penates are a Latin addition to the tale, for they are not important in the original Greek myths surrounding the Trojan War. The version wherein Aeneas brought the Penates probably is rooted in a story described by Dionysius of Halicarnassus but sourced from the 5th-century author Hellanicus of Lesbos, wherein Aeneas and a small army of surviving Trojan soldiers escaped to a citadel within Troy, where they held out for a brief period before escaping to Mount Ida, with the civilian population and sacred items. It is at this exact location, Mount Ida, where Hellanicus presumes that Dardanus, a native of Samothrace, migrated. According to the classicist Eva Stehle, this migration myth allowed for a new version of the story to be fabricated, one wherein Aeneas took the descendants of Dardanus, and alongside them the Samothracian gods, to Lavinium. The first time wherein Aeneas is described specifically as taking these sacred statues on his journey to Lavinium is in the Alexandra of the late 4th-century BCE author Lycophron, who describes Aeneas traveling to Lavinium and constructing a statue of a sow and a temple to Athena, which parallels the sanctuary of Menrva known to have existed between the 4th and 2nd centuries BCE at the site. Moreover, Lycophron writes that Aeneas will establish a shrine to his father's gods, presumably referring to the Penates. The first reference to the Penates in a Latin work appears within the Bellum Punicum of the 3rd-century poet Gnaeus Naevius, who describes Anchises—the father of Aeneas—performing a sacrifice on the table of the Penates.

It was only until later that versions of the story appear wherein the Samothracians specifically brought their holy objects with them to the Troad. Dionysius eventually wrote that Dardanus married the Arcadian princess Chryse, she brought wither her as a dowry the Palladia and other sacred objects of Athena. Afterwards, following a massive flood, the Arcadians migrated to Samothrace, where they then established the temple of the Great Gods. Then, the Arcadians migrated into Asia Minor, taking with them the aforementioned sacred objects, which ended up in a temple at Troy, thus leaving them in place for Aeneas to abscond with them. One scholiast on the work of Servius the Grammarian records that Varro likewise claimed that the deities were imported from Samothracia to Phrygia, whence they were then imported into Italy. Varro, as cited by this scholiast, supposedly wrote that Aeneas was permitted by the Greeks to take something he chose from the ruins of Troy, in response to which he chose to free his father Anchises. The Greeks were supposedly shocked at this decision, for others—when presented with a similar opportunity—instead elected to take gold or silver. Due to their admiration, the Greeks then allowed for Aeneas to take another item he so wished, and Aeneas chose to take the Penates. However, the scholiast also notes an alternative perspective, sourced from the 1st-century BCE historian Titus Pomponius Atticus, according to which Aeneas merely picked up the Penates at Samothrace in the middle of his journey to Italy. Still another version of the story is mentioned by Festus, one supposedly sourced from an author named Critolaus, who wrote that Aeneas and a Samothracian named Saon took the Penates with them to Lavinium. The story is also found in the Aeneid, wherein the ghost of Hector entrusts the "sacred things" ("sacra") and Penates of Troy to the legendary hero. In the Aeneid, the Penates serve to remind Aeneas of his mission and guide him to Italy. At one point, they appear to Aeneas, having been sent Apollo to instruct the hero that he was not destined to settle in Crete, but instead in Italy.

Archaeological evidence may attest to an ancient connection between the Penates and Lavinium, for the Sanctuary of the Thirteen Altars—a site in Lavinium that shows heavy Greek influence—may be identified as a shrine to the Penates. At this particular site, an ancient Archaic Latin inscription has been uncovered dedicated to Castor and Pollux, the Dioscuri, who were themselves closely connected with the Penates. Dionysius of Halicarnassus cites another historian named Timaeus, who supposedly heard from locals at Lavinium that, within their temple for the Penates, they housed caducei and a Trojan earthenware vessel. According to the classicist Stefan Weinstock, this earthenware vessel parallels a Greek custom at Sparta and Tarentum whereby two amphorae were offered to the Dioscuri. Ultimately, Weinstock suggests that the Penates were probably originally identified with the Dioscuri and that their cult arrived at Lavinium from Tarentum. According to Servius, when consuls, praetors, or dictators left office, they used to perform a sacrifice to the Penates and Vesta at Lavinium. However, Macrobius provides a slightly different account, stating that consuls, praetors, dictators used to sacrifice to the Penates and Vesta at Lavinium upon assuming office.

Section of the Ara Pacis supposedly depicting Aeneas performing a sacrifice

Augustus (r. 27 BCE – 14 CE) himself evidently took some pride in his connection with the Penates, for he mentions having renovated the temple on the Velia in his Res Gestae. Moreover, Lloyd notes the existence of a possible representation of Aeneas sacrificing to the Penates on the Ara Pacis, which is performed in front of a temple featuring statues of two individuals adorned holding spears, which—according to Lloyd—fits with the description provided by Dionysius. Lloyd interprets this depiction as further evidence of Augustus's personal connection with the Penates, and he states that the Ara Pacis relief is merely another example of Augustus identifying his own personal gods with those of the state. On this basis, he concludes that Virgil must have been intentionally seeking to pay homage to Augustus with his reference to "Penates and the great gods." However, the identification of this relief as a depiction of Aeneas performing a sacrifice and the identification of the two background figures as the Penates have both been challenged. Regarding the latter point, the classicist Paul Rehak notes that the Penates are usually depicted as two youths, akin to the Dioscuri, whereas the two beings on the temple are older, and better understood as representations of important male deities, particular Jupiter and Dis or Pluto, all of whom are frequently portrayed in this manner.

== See also ==
- Hestia
- Penny Penates
- Ubusunagami
