= Berners Street Mansions =

Coordinates: 51°31′06″N 0°08′14″W

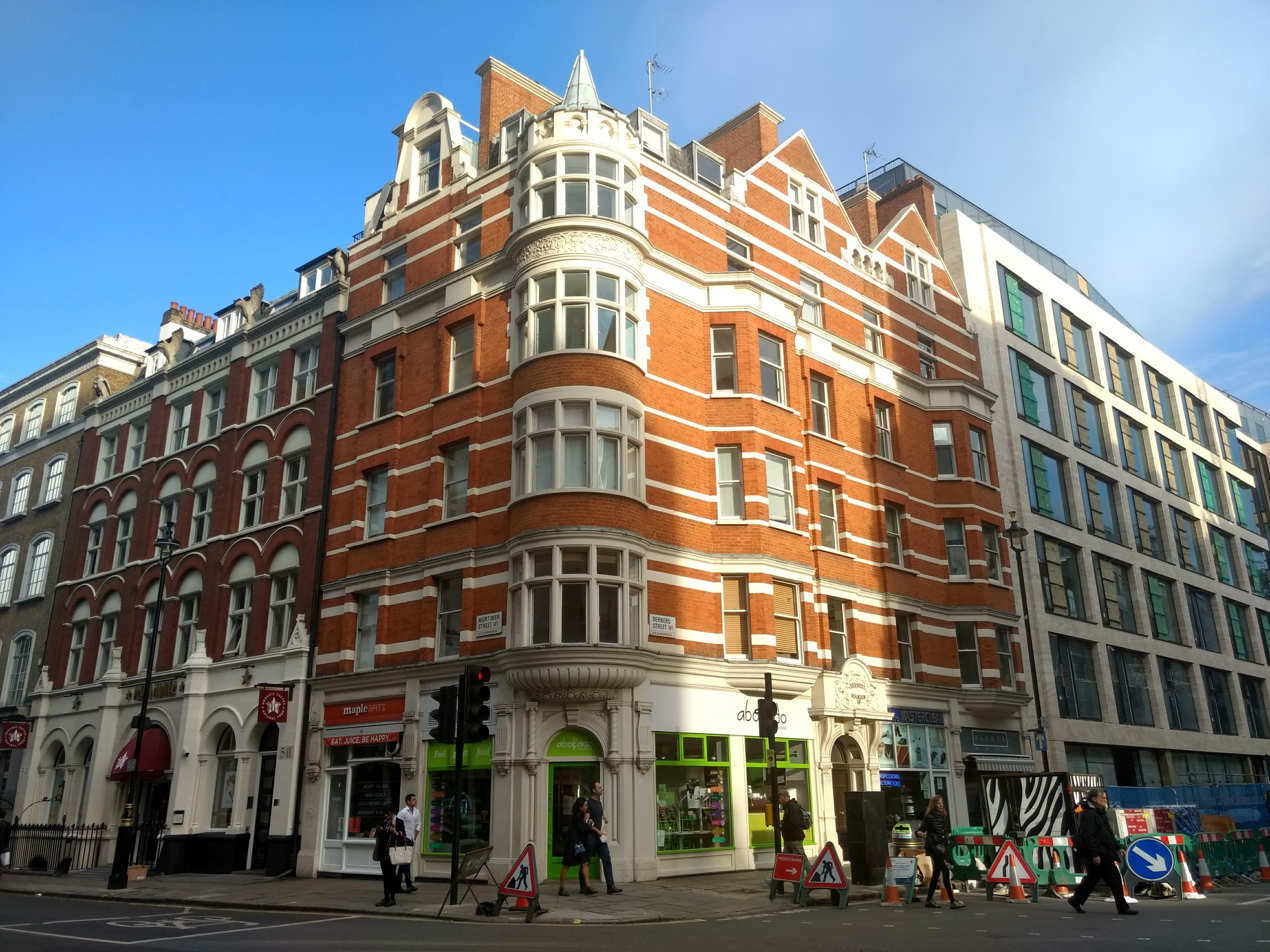
Berners Street Mansions

Berners Mansions is a six-storey Edwardian mansion block located in Berners Street in the City of Westminster. Berners Mansions was designed in 1897 by George Dennis Martin (1848-1915), Architect, of Pall Mall East. It is an unlisted building of merit within the Charlotte Street West Conservation Area and recognised as a positive contributor to the townscape of Berners Street and East Marylebone. It is a red brick building situated on the corner of Berners Street and Mortimer Street (formerly Charles Street), opposite the site of the former Middlesex Hospital (now called Fitzroy Place) and comprises 10 residential flats and 4 ground floor shops.

== Construction ==
Berners Mansions was built in 1897, by Frederick Britton of 469 Caledonian Road, Islington, following demolition of the earlier 18th century shops and houses at nos. 34-36 Berners Street. Occupants of the earlier building included Thomas Filmer & Sons, furniture makers (34 Berners Street); Mr White's, baker (35 Berners Street); and Edward Speller, tea dealer and grocer (36 Berners Street).

36 Berners Street is clearly illustrated in Tallis's Street Views of London in 1838-40. The building is depicted from the Charles Street perspective and labelled as Grocer & Italian Warehouse, Post Office, and SPELLER. A photograph in the English Heritage archives dated c. 1861 shows the same building from the Berners Street perspective with the shop sign of T Filmer clearly visible above no. 34.

In January 1901 the Berners Estate placed a series of newspaper advertisements offering for sale at auction on Wednesday, January 23, 1901:

"a highly eligible investment in a substantial modern block of premises, known as the Berners-street Mansions, forming the corner of Berners-street and Mortimer-street opposite the Middlesex Hospital, of handsome elevation, the upper part arranged in convenient suites of residential flats, occupied by responsible tenants, and the ground-floor devoted to four capital light shops with basements, all well let (except one shop) at rising rents, and together of the present value of £1,490 per annum."
