= Berners Street =

Street in Westminster, London, United Kingdom

Coordinates: 51°31′2″N 0°8′12″W

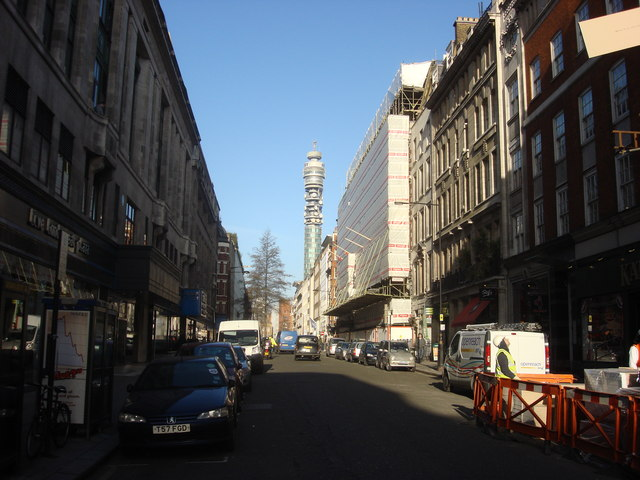
Berners Street

Berners Street is a thoroughfare located to the north of Oxford Street in the City of Westminster in the West End of London, originally developed as a residential street in the mid-18th century by property developer William Berners, and later devoted to larger commercial and semi-industrial buildings or mansion blocks of flats. It has associations with Charles Dickens, and was the location of makers of musical instruments including pianos and harps, as well as furniture and film-makers.

== Geography ==
Berners Street runs approximately 315 metres in a northerly direction from the junction of Oxford Street and Wardour Street to join up with Mortimer Street (formerly Charles Street) and the former Middlesex Hospital (now called Fitzroy Place). The street lies in an area known as Fitzrovia and is considered historically to be in East Marylebone. Twenty one trees were added to Berners Street in 2012.

== History ==
Berners Street was originally developed as a residential street by the Berners Estate in the mid-eighteenth century.

John Slater, surveyor of the Berners Estate, wrote in 1918:

On 21st May 1738, William Berners let for ninety-nine years to Thomas Huddle the whole frontage of 655 feet to Oxford Street and 100 feet in depth (with the exception of width required for two proposed new streets – which would be the present Berners and Newman Streets and a widening of Wells Lane) at a total rent of 4s. per foot per annum. Huddle was to pull down all old buildings and to erect new ones, and Berners was to construct a sewer from Wells Lane to Rathbone Place. Huddle began to build the houses in Oxford Street at once, and apportioned there rents, the first lease for ninety-nine years being granted in 1739. The total annual rent received by the estate for the Oxford Street houses was £135 8s. until the last of the old leases fell in 1838. The sewer referred to still runs under some of the houses in Berners Street and Wells Street, but it is now disused. Between 1750 and 1763 the existing streets on the Estate were laid out: the first lease granted in Newman Street is dated 1750, in Charles Street, now called Mortimer Street, in 1759, in Castle Street and Wells Street in 1760, in Berners Street in 1763, and in Suffolk Street, now called Nassau Street, in 1764. Building must have gone on rapidly, for in 1773 there were existing sixty completed houses in Berners Street, twenty-three in Castle Street, thirty-five in Mortimer Street, exclusive of the Middlesex Hospital, ninety in Newman Street, and twenty-three in Nassau Street. Many of the houses show strongly the influence of the Brothers Adam, and some ceilings, which are very beautiful, were almost certainly from their original designs. A lease for 999 years was granted to the Middlesex Hospital in 1754.

Edward Walford, wrote in Old and New London (Volume 4), published 1878:

Berners Street, so called after the family title of its ground-landlord, runs northward a little to the east of Wells Street. It was built about the middle of the last century, and has always been celebrated as the "home and haunt" of artists, painters, and sculptors. Among its former residents are to be reckoned Opie, Fuseli, and Sir William Chambers, the latter of whom we have already mentioned in connection with Somerset House. Opie was buried in St. Paul's Cathedral. His second wife, Amelia, the learned Quakeress, was well known by her writings, "Tales of Real Life," "Poems," "Simple Tales," &c. In this street was the bank in which Fauntleroy, the forger, was a partner.

Walford records the proliferation of charitable and medical institutions in Berners Street during the 19th century:

Berners Street forms the head-quarters of several foreign and charitable institutions, some of which have been established ever since the last century. In 1788 was founded the Society for the Relief of Widows and Orphans of Medical Men. The Medical and Chirurgical Society was established in 1805, and incorporated in 1834, for the cultivation and promotion of medicine and surgery. The society possesses a good library, numbering some 25,000 volumes. Here, too, are the Obstetrical Society of London, instituted in 1858; and the Pathological Society, founded in 1846. The lastnamed society was instituted for the exhibition and examination of specimens, drawings, microscopic preparations, casts or models of morbid parts, with accompanying written or oral descriptions, illustrative of pathological science. All the above-mentioned medical societies, together with another styled the Clinical Society of London, are accommodated in the same house (No. 53). Adjoining this building (No. 54) is St. Peter's Hospital for Stone. This charitable institution was established in 1860, and its object is to benefit as large a number as possible of suffering poor by affording them, without a letter of recommendation, the advantages of hospital accommodation; to improve medical and surgical knowledge on the subjects specially treated of here, by bringing together a large number of patients suffering from those diseases, and thus affording opportunities for observation and classification; and, in the cases of patients suffering from stone, to investigate the best means of accomplishing its removal with the least possible danger to the life of the patient, and, whenever practicable, to substitute lithotrity for lithotomy. The practice of the hospital is open to all students and members of the profession. At No. 22 are the offices of the Ladies' Sanitary Association, and also the Society for Promoting the Employment of Women. At No. 9 is the Berners Women's Club—one of the first experiments in this direction. In the same house are the offices of the Central Committee of the National Society for Women's Suffrage. The London Association for the Protection of Trade has its office at No. 16.

Many of these institutions springing up in proximity to the Middlesex Hospital:

In Charles Street, at the top of Berners Street, the view down which it commands, is the Middlesex Hospital. The building, which is of brick, and very extensive, comprises a centre and wings; it is fitted up with baths, laboratory works, ventilating shaft, and, indeed, all the necessary appliances for comfort, &c. The hospital dates from about ten or twenty years after the splendid bequest of Thomas Guy, the penurious bookseller of Lombard Street. It was first established, in 1745, in Windmill Street, Tottenham Court Road, for sick and lame persons, and for lying-in married women. It was removed, in 1755, to its present site, when it stood among green fields and lanes. Since 1807 the midwifery patients, to the number of nearly a thousand yearly, instead of being received as inmates, are attended at their own homes by the medical officers of the hospital. The cancer wards were founded by a gift of £4,000 from Mr. Samuel Whitbread, in 1807, to which other gifts and legacies were added. A remarkable incident in the history of the hospital is that in 1793 it became a refuge for many of the French royalist emigrants driven from France by the Jacobin Reign of Terror. The buildings were enlarged by new wings constructed in 1775, and again in 1834. Lord Robert Seymour, a zealous and munificent friend of this institution, obtained for it the royal patronage of George IV., which is continued by her present Majesty. The medical school, established in 1835, enjoys a high reputation; it is furnished with a museum of valuable collections. The hospital contains beds for upwards of three hundred patients. Of these twenty-six are devoted to the cancer establishment, instituted in the year 1791, where the patient is allowed to remain "until relieved by art or released by death;" eight are appropriated to women suffering from diseases peculiar to their sex; the remainder of the beds being set apart for general miscellaneous cases. Upwards of nine hundred lying-in married women are attended at their own habitations, and eighteen thousand out-door patients are relieved every year. The hospital is unendowed. The annual subscriptions amount to not more than £2,355, while of late years the expenditure has been increased by some necessary works of improvement. This hospital has numbered among its surgeons and physicians men of the highest eminence in the medical profession; besides which it has been the cradle of many eminent careers in surgery.

Edward Walford evokes something of the street market atmosphere at the corner of Berners Street and Charles Street so vividly described by Henry Mayhew in the 1840s and 50s:

The southern side of Charles Street, which is continued by Goodge Street into Tottenham Court Road, presents a busy appearance, especially on Friday and Saturday evenings; and as one of the few street markets remaining at the West-end, and probably destined at no long interval to disappear, may claim a short notice. To the long row of stallkeepers on its southern side, who display their stores of fish, fruit, and vegetables in hand-barrows and baskets, and on movable slabs, we may apply the words of Henry Mayhew:—"The scene in these parts has more of the character of a fair than of a market. There are hundreds of stalls, and every stall has its one or two lights; either it is illuminated by the intense white light of the new self-generating gas-lamp, or else it is brightened up by the red smoking flame of the old-fashioned grease lamps. One man shows off his yellow haddock with a candle stuck in a bundle of firewood; his neighbour makes his candlestick of a huge turnip, and the tallow gutters over its sides; while the boy shouting 'Eight a penny pears!' has rolled his dip in a thick coat of brown paper, that flares away with the candle. Some stalls are crimson with a fire shining through the holes beneath the baked chestnut stove. Others have handsome octahedral lamps; while a few have a candle shining through a sieve. These, with the sparkling ground-glass of the tea-dealers' shops, and the butchers' gas-lights streaming and fluttering in the wind like flags of flame, pour forth such a flood of light, that at a distance the atmosphere immediately above the spot is as lurid as if the street was on fire.

=== Jamaica connections ===
On 2 November 1756, Richard Bathurst delivered his resignation letter to the Board of the Middlesex Hospital, thus:

Gentlemen, Being obliged by the Necessity of my Affairs to make a second Voyage to Jamaica, & being uncertain when I shall be able to return, I beg that from this Day you will consider my Place in your Hospital as vacant. I cannot Gentlemen make this Resignation without returning my sincerest thanks for the Distinctions with which I was elected, the Kindness with which my occasional Absence has been permitted, & the Civilities which I have received. I shall always wish Prosperity to the Hospital tho I can no longer attend it, & shall remember all your Favours with that Gratitude which they may justly claim, from Gentlemen. Your most obliged and most humble servant, Richard Bathurst

Genealogist Anne M. Powers wrote a study of the interchange between 18th-century Jamaica and mercantile London in her book and blog 'A Parcel of Ribbons', which gives some insight into Berners Street in colonial times:

When Robert Cooper Lee returned to England from Jamaica with his family at the end of August 1771, they lived for a short time at Old Bond Street in London. But within a very few weeks Robert found a house in Berners Street on which he signed a lease for thirty years. Today in Britain anyone who can afford to buy a house also buys the freehold and therefore owns both the house and the land on which it stands. In 18th-century London such a situation was uncommon. Even the very wealthy would sign a lease on a house for anything from a few months (to attend the London social season) to a period of years. Thirty years was common but it could be anything up to ninety-nine years. Berners Street runs at right angles to Oxford Street, then still sometimes known as the Oxford Road, and while it later acquired a reputation as a location for artists and writers, there were a number of families with Jamaican connections who settled there and its occupants were generally wealthy and well connected. The houses were new – elegant, Georgian terraces with rear access to their stables via Berners Mews. The Lee's house at number twenty-six was described as having lofty airy bed chambers of good proportions, servants rooms and numerous closets, lofty capacious drawing room with an elegant chimney piece and stucco cornice, a large dining room and sideboard recess, library, lofty entrance hall, and suitable attached offices well arranged, and supplied with water; standing for two carriages, stabling for five horses and dry arched cellaring. The history of the development of this area goes back to the middle of the previous century when, in 1654, Josias Berners bought an estate in the parish of St Marylebone for £970 from Sir Francis Williamson of Isleworth. Substantial development was carried out in the first half of the eighteenth century by William Berners, and so the family gave their name to the street. The Berners family were connected to Jamaica three times over through the Jarrett family. Three of William Berners' grandchildren married Jarretts of Orange Valley, Trelawny – Maria Berners married Herbert Newton Jarrett (the third of that name), her brother William married Rachel Allen Jarrett (the second of that name) and their brother Henry Denny Berners married Sarah Jarrett. Sarah and Rachel were sisters, Herbert was their father's much younger half-brother. But to return to Berners Street! The extent of settlement in the area by members of the Plantocracy is evidenced by the numbers of records in the parish registers of St Marylebone, for their baptisms, marriages and burials. Later in the century these wealthy occupants moved gradually northwards...Although Bedford Square ... remains largely unchanged, Robert Cooper Lee's Berners Street house is long gone, along with much of 18th century London, replaced by Victorian apartments, flattened by wartime bombs, rebuilt after the war and replaced again by glass and steel tower blocks.

=== Berners Street Hoax ===
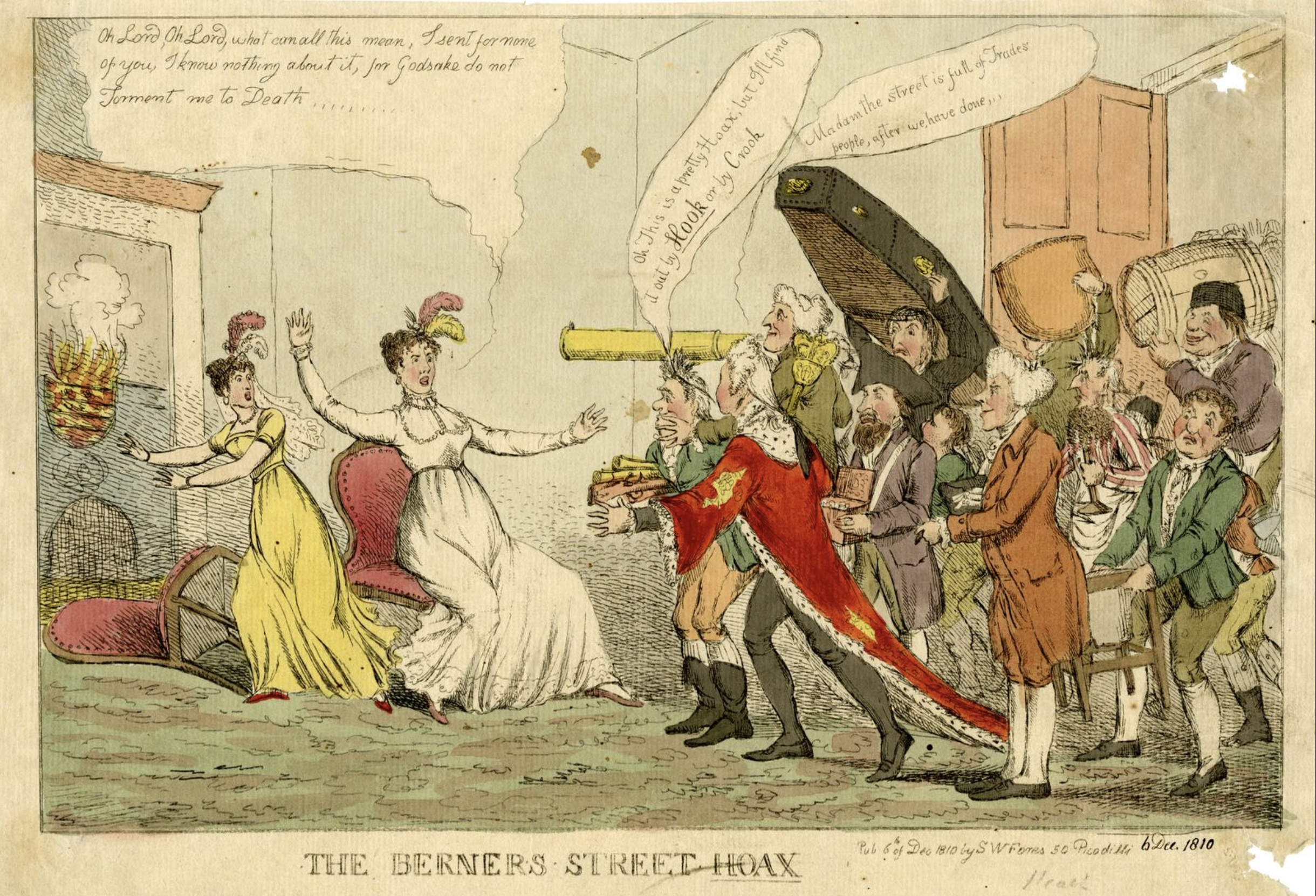
Caricature of the Berners Street hoax

The street was given notoriety by a practical joke, known as the Berners Street hoax, perpetrated by the writer Theodore Hook in 1810. Hook had made a bet with his friend, Samuel Beazley, that he could transform any house in London into the most talked-about address in a week, which he achieved by sending out thousands of letters in the name of Mrs Tottenham, who lived at 54 Berners Street, requesting deliveries, visitors, and assistance. Hook stationed himself in the house directly opposite 54 Berners Street, from where he and his friend spent the day watching the chaos unfold. The site at 54 Berners Street is now occupied by the Sanderson Hotel.

=== Charles Booth ===
In October 1898, Charles Booth took a series of walks with Police Constable R.J. French of the Tottenham Court Road subdivision of the D police division and recorded observations in his notebooks for Life and Labour of the People of London. On 21 October he walked with PC French around "District 3" including the area "bounded on the North by Mortimer Street and Goodge St. on the East by Charlotte St. and Rathbone Place, on the South by Oxford Street and on the West by Regent St. being part of the parishes of All Souls and All Saints." Setting out from the corner of Goodge Street and Charlotte Street he walked north up Berners Street noting only "4 1/2 storeys, centre for music establishments, piano, instrument, music publishers etc."

== Notable residents ==
=== Arts ===
- William Chambers, the architect and interior decorator, was able to build himself a house "in his own speculation", at 13, Berners Street, along with two adjacent houses, no. 14 for James Lacy and no. 15 for Thomas Rouse, all begun in 1764. According to his biographer John Harris, "Chambers's garden is terminated on the mews by a stable and adjacent a large room that must have been his drawing office, allowing access from the mews for the assistants. The rear of his house was decorated in papier mâché in a 'fanciful', perhaps Chinoiserie, style." Images of some of Chambers' interiors are held in the RIBA library.
- Thomas Collins, an ornamental plasterer who worked for, and was a friend and partner of Sir William Chambers.
- John Opie, the historical and portrait artist (8, Berners Street) until his death in April 1807.
- James Lonsdale, the English portrait painter (8, Berners Street). He bought John Opie's studio at number 8 and remained there from May 1820 until July 1830.
- Henry Fuseli, the Swiss painter and draughtsman (13, Berners Street, the former home of William Chambers) 1803–

=== Literature ===
Berners Street is strongly associated with the writer Charles Dickens. Dickens' maternal great aunt, Mrs Charles Charlton, ran a lodging house at 16 Berners Street, and Dickens was often taken here by his mother, and got a job as a result in 1827. One of the lodgers was a young lawyer called Edward Blackmore, who was impressed by the youngster and employed him as a solicitor's clerk at Ellis & Blackmore in Grays Inn at the age of 15 (for more than twice the pay of Dickens' dreaded, and latterly famous, blacking factory job).

It was in Berners Street that, as a boy, Dickens saw a wandering woman, upon whom the character Miss Havisham from Great Expectations was based. Dickens described her as "a conceited old creature, cold and formal in manner" who was "dressed entirely in white with a ghastly white plaiting round her head and face inside her white bonnet." He added that she "went simpering mad on personal grounds alone – no doubt because a wealthy Quaker wouldn't marry her. This is her bridal dress. She is always walking up here… we observe in her mincing step and fishy eye that she intends to lead him a sharp life." This was in his essay "Where We Stopped Growing" which was published in Household Words on 1 January 1853.

Later in life, at 31 Berners Street, Dickens installed his secret young lover, the actress Ellen Lawless Ternan (nicknamed Nelly), who at 19 was 27 years younger than him, and the same age as his eldest daughter. It was September 1858 when she moved in accompanied by her mother Francis, who was an actress, and two sisters, Maria, another actress, and Fanny, a singer. After just a month Ellen and Maria reported to him that they were being pestered by a policeman, whom Dickens suspected of having been bribed by a man sexually interested in either or both of them. He complained of this "extraordinary, and dangerous and unwarrantable conduct in a policeman" whom he thought should be dismissed. But fear of publicity prevented him pursuing it. Perhaps that was why they all moved in March 1859 to Ampthill Square. Ellen had a habit of wearing scarlet geraniums and white heather in her hair. She was persuaded to give up acting by Dickens in August 1859, and received regular payments from his Coutts Bank account. On her death at the age of 75, she was buried in Southsea, close to where Dickens was born.

- Ellen Ternan, actress and mistress of Charles Dickens (31, Berners Street)
- Samuel Taylor Coleridge, the poet (71, Berners Street)

=== Other residents ===
- Robert Cooper Lee (26, Berners Street) 30-year lease from 1771, subsequently moved to Bedford Square
- John Slater, FRSA, architect and surveyor to the Berners Estate (46, Berners Street), c. 1891

By the end of the nineteenth century the area around Berners Street was no longer completely residential and development plots were being amalgamated for the erection of larger commercial and semi-industrial buildings or for mansion blocks of flats. Examples of such mansion blocks include the Edwardian Berners street mansions (34–36, Berners Street) and Lancaster Court.

== Businesses and organisations ==
=== Furniture industry ===
From the 19th century Berners Street was the home of notable cabinet makers, upholsterers and furnishing companies including

- Lincrusta-Walton Wallcoverings, Showroom (9 Berners Street)
- Howard & Sons, furniture makers (22, 26 & 27, Berners Street)
- Filmer & Son, furniture makers (34, Berners Street)
- Sanderson, fabrics and wallpaper (49–57, Berners Street)
- Teale Fireplace Company, fireplace showroom (28, Berners Street)
- Well Fire & Foundry Company (15, Berners Street)
- Percy Heffer and Company, wallpaper showroom (64, Berners Street)
- Battam and Heywood, carver and gilder (Corner of Berners Street and 114, Oxford Street)
- Emerson's, 'art furniture', (Berners Street), c.1890, a shop established by Emmeline Pankhurst, which also acted as an estate agency, later moving to 223 Regent Street opposite Liberty's.

=== Hotels ===
During the 20th century several hotels became established on Berners Street including

- York Hotel, later converted into the mansion block known as York House (12, Berners Street)
- Berners Hotel (10, Berners Street, currently being redeveloped by Ian Schrager and Edition with Marriott International)
- Sanderson Hotel (49–57, Berners Street, formerly the head office of Sanderson)

=== Medical and charitable institutions ===
- Dr William Beale Marston's Museum of Science, Anatomy and The Wonders of Nature, opened (47, Berners Street)
- Madame Caplin's Anatomical and Physiological Gallery (for Ladies only) opened 1859 (58 Berners Street)
- Society for the Relief of Widows and Orphans of Medical Men, founded 1788 (53, Berners Street)
- The Medical and Chirurgical Society, established in 1805, and incorporated in 1834 (53, Berners Street)
- The Obstetrical Society of London, instituted in 1858 (53, Berners Street)
- The Pathological Society, founded in 1846 (53, Berners Street)
- The Clinical Society of London, founded 1868 (53, Berners Street)
- St Peter's Hospital for Stone (54, Berners Street)
- Ladies' Sanitary Association (22, Berners Street)

=== Women's suffrage movement ===
- The Society for Promoting the Employment of Women (22, Berners Street)
- Berners Club for Women (9, Berners Street) c. 1871–1898.

Elizabeth Crawford noted in her work on the Women's Suffrage Movement:

In 1871 the committee of the Berners Club included Francis Power Cobbe and Barbara Bodichon. The club to which the annual subscription was 10s, was open from 8 am until 10.30 pm on weekdays and from 9 am until 10.30 pm on Sundays. The club contained a reading room, supplied with newspapers and periodicals; a drawing room for society and conversation, and a dining room. The club was strictly unsectarian, and was open to Foreign as well as English members. The committee required each potential member to supply a reference as to respectability. The Berners Club was no longer in existence in 1898.

- Central Committee of the National Society for Women's Suffrage, founded 1867 (9, Berners Street)
- Ladies Town and Country Club (registered at Berners Street Mansions c. 1898–1900, secretary L. Jackson) and listed at 73 and 75 Mortimer Street until 1924.

=== Musical instrument makers ===
==== Piano makers ====
Various piano makers were located in Berners Street between 1820 and 1860, including:

- Robert Allison (29, Berners Street) c. 1837–1847
- Edward Dodd (3, Berners Street) fl. 1826–46
- John Cooper & Son (68, Berners Street)
- Philip George Holcombe (38, Berners Street) fl. 1855–60
- James Kennay & Co (15, Berners Street) fl. 1840–57
- Frederick Priestley (15, Berners Street) fl. c. 1850–60
- Challen & Son (3, Berners Street) 1859–60
- Henry Smart (27, Berners Street) fl. 1823–26
- John Cooper & Son (70, Berners Street) 1850–53
- Duff & Hodgson fl. 1843–60 (3, Berners Street) 1850
- Jacob & James Erart fl. c. 1855 (23, Berners Street) 1855
- Sandon & Steadman (Berners Street) c. 1890–1900

==== Harp makers ====
- Thomas Dodd, harp maker. Thomas Dodd came from a family of instrument makers – Dodd violin bows had been famous since the mid-1700. His father Edward died in 1810 at the very respectable age of 95. Dodd was mainly a dealer in instruments from 1809 to 1823, when he moved to Berners Street and then got interested in harps. He was also at Berwick Street in 1827 before returning to Berners Street. Thomas died in about 1830, and the business carried on until 1846 – presumably by means of his 2 sons (see Edward Dodd, 3, Berners Street). There is an 1822 patent for a laminated neck.
- Haarnack, harp maker (53 Berners Street). There were several generations of Haarnack dating up to the mid-1920s. The business was at Charlotte Street and there was a showroom in Fitzroy Square. For a time they were also at 53 Berners Street down the road from Dodds. The first of the line was chief mechanic at Erards in 1808. Haarnack were one of the last makers to continue trading and also had a thriving repair business. Marie Goosens mentions meeting 3 generations at their shop in her book "Life on a Harpstring".
- Erat's Harp Saloon was at 23 Berners Street from 1820 to 1858, and public concerts were held there. By the 1920s and into the 1950s Rudall, Carte & Co, a manufacturer of woodwind and brass instruments, was located at 23 Berners Street.

=== Music publishing ===
- Music Sales Group is Europe's largest printed music publisher, with headquarters in Berners Street, London. It owns the rights to hundreds of thousands of songs, imprints both for books and sheet music, operates the UK's largest chain of music shops, and sells sheet music, instruments and accessories direct through Musicroom.com.
- Novello & Co (1, Berners Street, 1867–1906) is a London-based printed music publishing company specialising in classical music, particularly choral repertoire. It was founded in 1811 by Vincent Novello.
- Performing Rights Society for Music (29–33 Berners Street), formerly the Performing Right Society, founded in 1914, is a UK copyright collection society and performance rights organisation undertaking collective rights management for musical works. PRS for Music was formed in 1997 as the MCPS-PRS Alliance, bringing together two collection societies: the Mechanical-Copyright Protection Society (MCPS) and Performing Right Society (PRS).

=== Film industry ===
The London Project records several businesses involved in the early film industry located in Berners Street:

- Barnard, W & Son, Artists Colours, (9, Berners Street) 1907
- Day and Night Screens Ltd, Screen Manufacturer and Supplier, (38a, Berners Street) 1913
- Duncan, Watson and Co, Electrical Engineers, (62, Berners Street) 1914
- Harrison and Co, Film Dealer, (66, Berners Street) 1900
- Keith Prowse & Co Ltd, Manufacturer of Automatic Machines, Automatic Pianos and Musical Instruments, Effects Machines, Bioscope Entertainment Provider, (38, Berners Street) 1909
- New Things Ltd, Automatic Pianos, (38, Berners Street) 1910
- Sichel, O & Co, Lens Manufacturer, (Berners Street) 1910
- Taylor, Taylor & Hobson Ltd, Lens Manufacturer (18, Berners Street) 1910

=== Miscellaneous businesses and organisations ===
• Abbott & co of Lancaster had an office at 18 Berners street circa 1904

- Schweppes Messrs J Schweppe & Co (51, Berners Street) 19th century
- International Maritime Organization (22, Berners Street) 20th century
- International Coffee Organization (22, Berners Street) 20th century
- The London Association for the Protection of Trade (16, Berners Street) 19th century
- A satellite office of Haymarket Media Group

==== Bourne and Hollingsworth ====
Bourne & Hollingsworth was a department store on the corner of Oxford Street and Berners Street. Its building was built in the late nineteenth century, and the store moved into the building in the early 1900s, remaining there until it closed in 1983. Bourne & Hollingsworth is featured in the 1954 Adelphi film The Crowded Day, which follows one day in the life of a group of department store employees and was partially shot on location inside and outside the store.
