= Berners Street hoax =

1810 hoax in London, England

Coordinates: 51.5176°N 0.1372°W

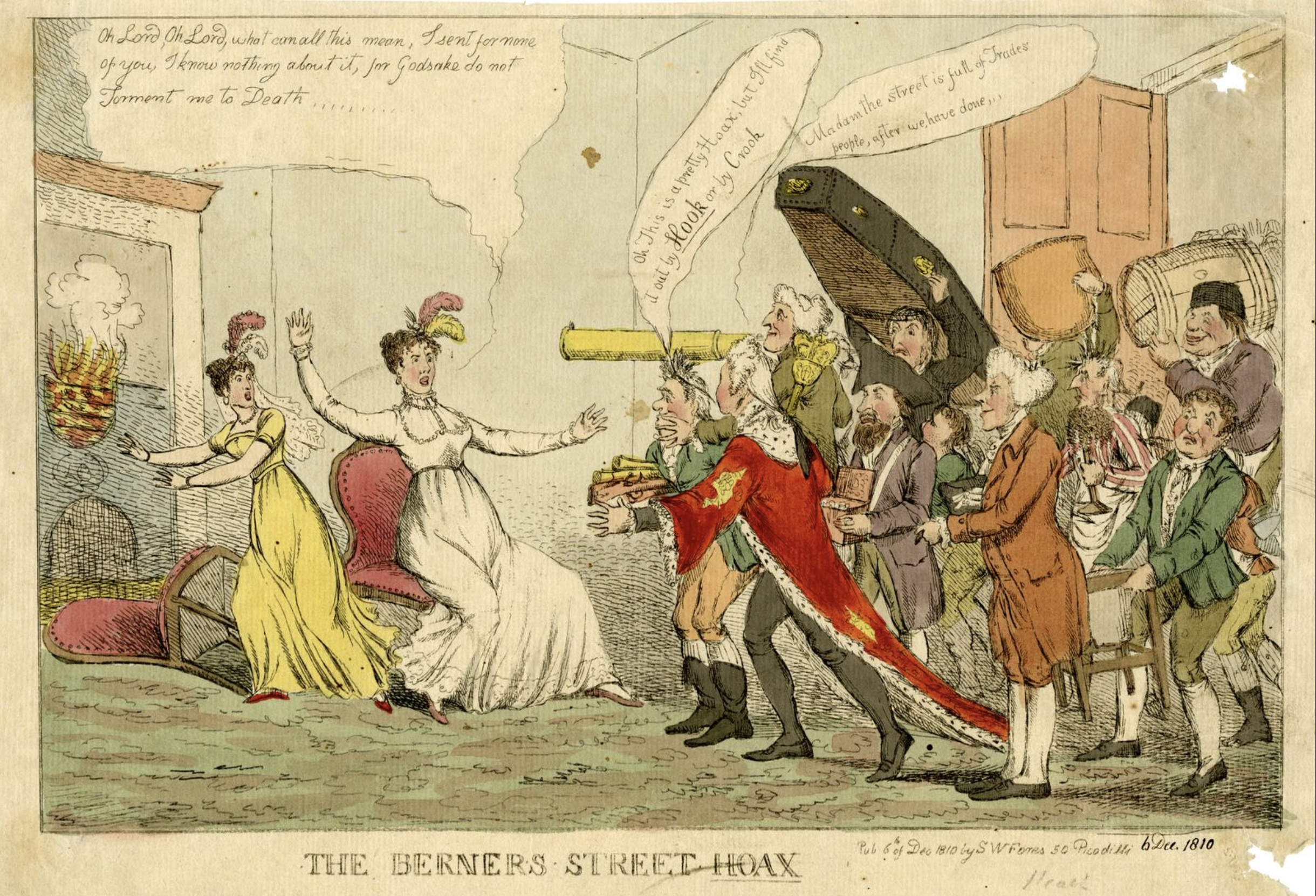
A caricature of the hoax by William Heath

The Berners Street hoax was perpetrated by the writer Theodore Hook in Westminster (now part of London) in 1810. After several weeks of preparation he made an apparently spontaneous bet with a friend that he could transform any property into the most talked-about address in London. Hook spent six weeks sending between a thousand and four thousand letters to tradespeople and businesses ordering deliveries of their goods and services to 54 Berners Street, Westminster, at various times on 27 November 1810. Several well-known people were also invited to call on the address, including the chairmen of the Bank of England and the East India Company, the Duke of Gloucester and the Lord Mayor of London.

Hook and his friends rented rooms in the house opposite number 54 to view proceedings. Chimney sweeps began arriving at the address at 5:00 am on the day, followed by hundreds of representatives of several trades and businesses, including auctioneers, undertakers, grocers, butchers, bakers, pastry chefs and dancing masters; goods deliveries included organs, furniture, coal, wedding cakes, food, drink and a coffin. The police were called to try to manage the crowd but they were not able to clear the street until after the final influx of visitors at 5:00 pm: domestic servants who thought they were to be interviewed for a job.

Hook was unidentified at the time, but admitted his involvement in a semi-autobiographical novel published twenty-five years after the event. The hoax was repeated across Britain and Paris, and was retold on stage, in song and by cartoonists.

== Background and build-up ==
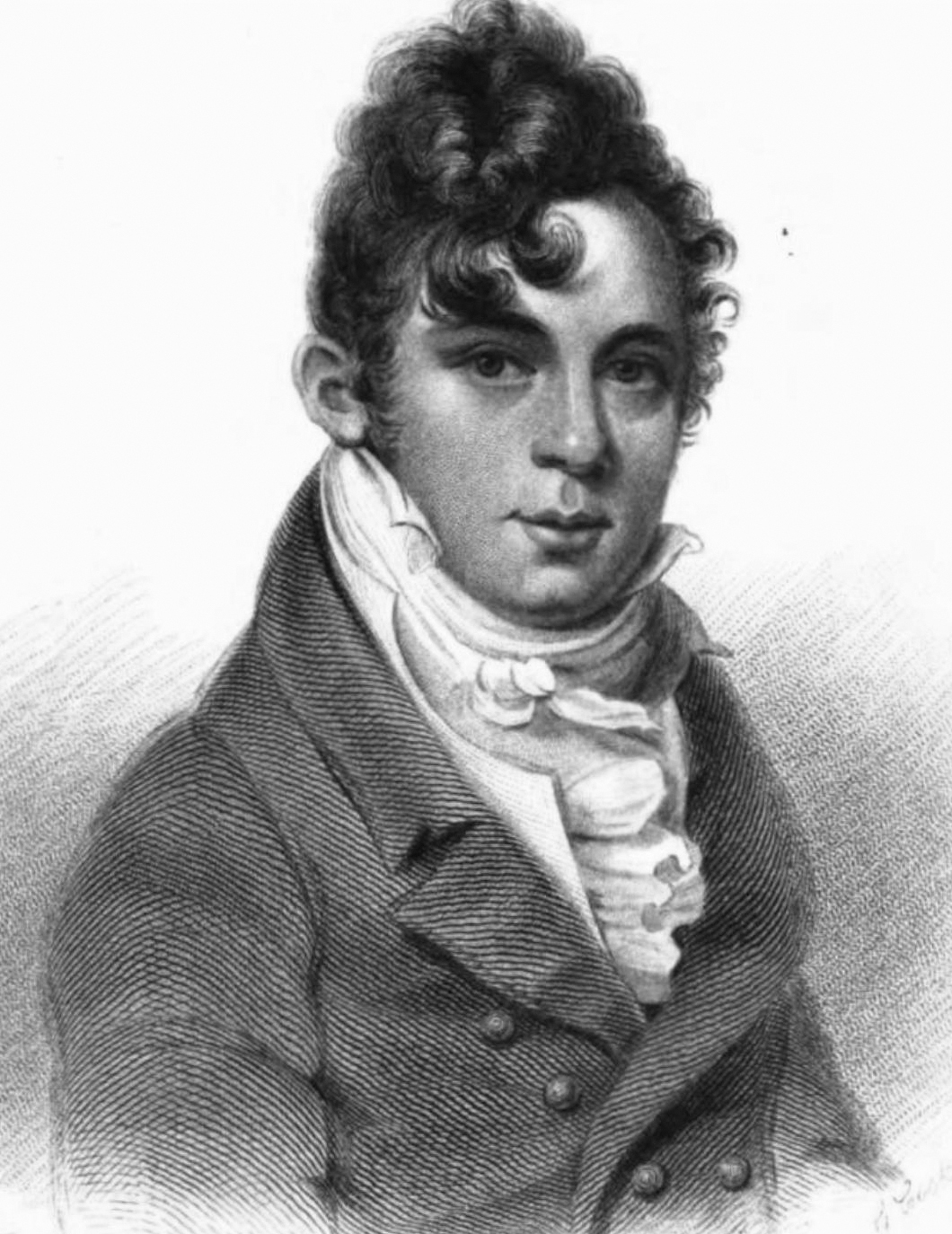
Portrait of Theodore Hook, the hoax's perpetrator, c. 1810

Theodore Hook was a writer of comic operas and farces for the stage and the author of several novels. He had a mischievous side to his nature and was known as a prankster and hoaxer. The historian Judith Flanders observes that he was as well known for his practical jokes as he was for his writing. At the time of the Berners Street hoax he was 22 years old.

Hook's planning for the hoax began in October 1810, six weeks before the event, and he had two friends to assist with it. The identities of his accomplices—one male and one female—are unknown, but it is thought that one of them later became a famous actress. A large number of letters were sent to tradespeople, suppliers and the well-known using different pretexts; estimates of the number of letters vary from "at least a thousand" to four thousand.

In November 1810 Hook and a friend were walking down Berners Street when Hook pointed, seemingly at random, to the house at number 54 and bet that he could make the property the most talked-about address in London. His friend took him up on the bet and the wager was set for one guinea. (Note: According to calculations based on the Consumer Price Index measure of inflation, one guinea in 1810 is approximately £70 in 2025.)

The pretexts used changed depending on who was being contacted, but all had the same instructions: to call on Mrs Tottenham, the resident of 54 Berners Street. (Note: Some sources give the surname as "Tottingham".) For some, the notes asked the recipient to "call on her at two to-morrow, as she wishes to consult him about the sale of an estate"; others ordered transport, saying she "requests that a post-chaise and four [horses] may be at her home ... to convey her to the first stage towards Bath". The notes to businessmen read that she was "desirous of speaking with him on business of importance"; a version sent to dance teachers asked them "to call on her to-morrow, between the hours of two and three, as she is desirous that her daughters should receive instructions". Letters were sent to the chairmen of the Bank of England and the East India Company asking them to call to hear details of frauds that were affecting their organisations. The Duke of Gloucester was sent a note asking him to attend the deathbed of a family retainer.

== Incident ==
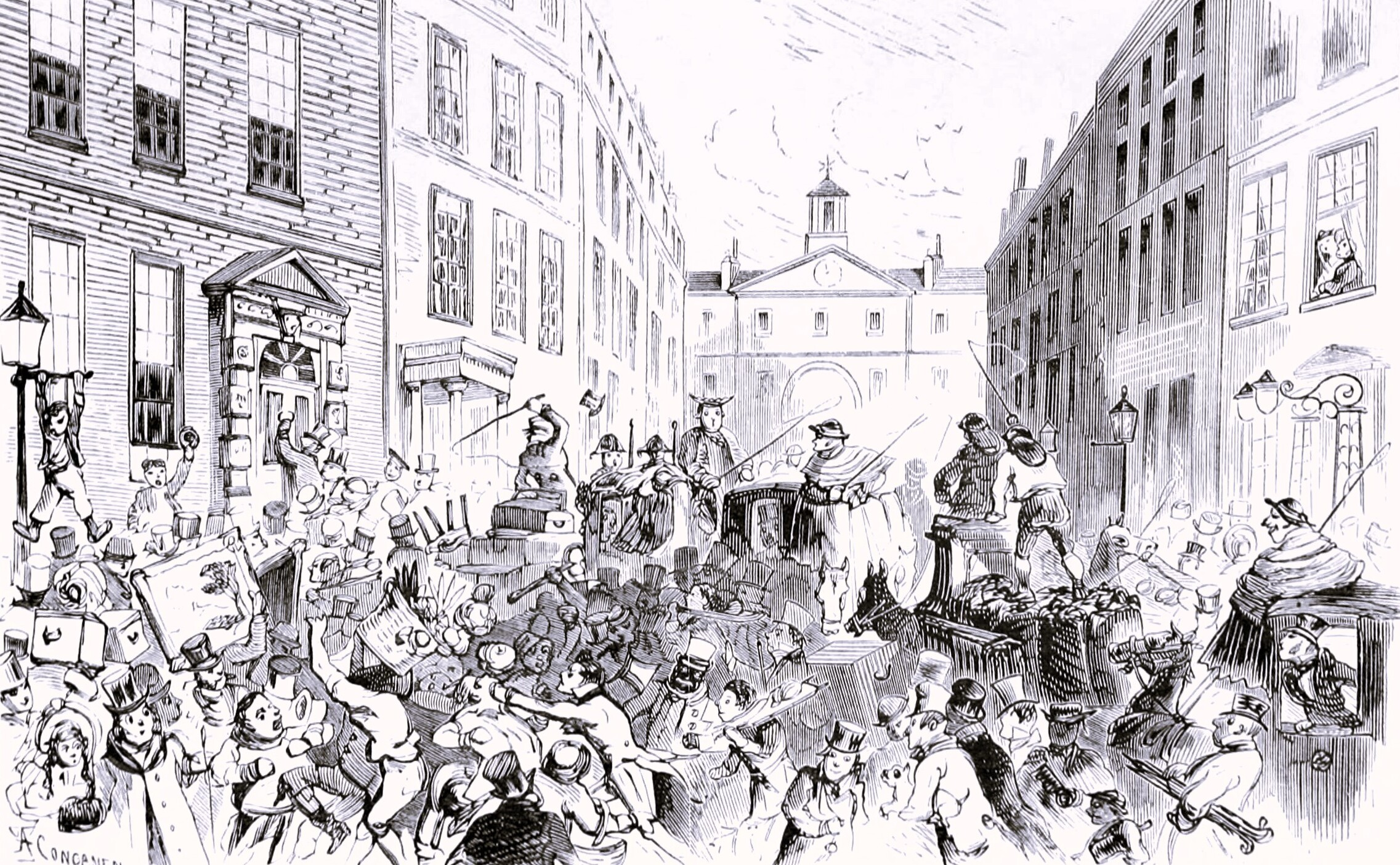
Illustration of the hoax

Hook and his friends had hired rooms in the house opposite 54 Berners Street so they could observe the proceedings of the day. At 5:00 am on 27 November 1810 a series of chimney sweeps knocked at the door of number 54, saying they had been sent for. They were followed by dozens of coal waggons, bringing their cargo from Paddington wharves; around the same time, a dozen bakers turned up to deliver elaborate wedding cakes, followed by a series of bootmakers. According to The Times, they were followed by "upholsterers' goods in cart-loads, organs, pianofortes, linen, jewellery and every other description of furniture, [that] were lodged as near as possible to the door of No. 54, with anxious tradespeople and a laughing mob". With each new wave of arrivals, the crowd around the property grew, as many stayed to watch who would be the next to arrive. The chairmen of the Bank of England and the East India Company, and the Duke of Gloucester, all turned up during the day, as did an undertaker with a coffin made to Mrs Tottenham's measurements.

Approximate location of 54 Berners Street, London

In addition to forty fishmongers—who turned up with lobsters and cod—and forty butchers, each with a leg of mutton, there were fifty pastry chefs with 2,500 raspberry tarts. Joshua Smith, the Lord Mayor of London—in full regalia and riding in his official carriage—turned up, but did not stop. Instead he went to Marlborough Street Magistrates Court to have police sent to the scene. According to the report in The Times, as the officers arrived at Berners Street they found "six stout men bearing an organ, surrounded by wine-porters with permits, barbers with wigs, mantua-makers with band-boxes, [and] opticians with the various articles of their trade". The Morning Post also reported the following attendees: "accoucheurs, tooth-drawers, miniature-painters, artists of every description, auctioneers, undertakers, grocers, mercers, post-chaises, mourning-coaches, poultry, rabbits, pigeons, &c". Attempting to stop the situation, the police blocked off both ends of the street, but people kept turning up for their appointments, including, at 5:00 pm, a large number of domestic servants, all of whom thought they were to be interviewed for a job. It was not until long after it had turned dark that the visitors stopped turning up and the crowds dispersed.

== Aftermath ==
Police searched for the culprit and a reward was offered, but to no avail. Hook thought it prudent to leave the metropolis and spent a few weeks in the countryside. By 1812 Hook was suspected of the hoax; he confessed to it in his 1835 semi-autobiographical novel Gilbert Gurney:

[T]here's nothing like fun – what else made the effect in Berner's Street? I am the man – I did it ... copy the joke, and it ceases to be one; – any fool can imitate an example once set – but for originality of thought and design, I do think that was perfect.

The hoax was repeated in other British cities as well as in Paris. It became the source of inspiration for comic ballads and cartoons and was referred to in pantomimes for several years. After Hook's death in 1841 his friend Nancy Matthews—the wife of the actor Charles Matthew—stated it was not Hook who was responsible for the hoax but "a young gentleman, now ... one of the most rigid churchmen in the kingdom". She went on to say that while Hook did not undertake the hoax in Berners Street, he had previously done the same prank on a smaller scale in Bedford Street.

There has never been an explanation as to why the hoax was undertaken, or for the selection of Mrs Tottenham—a wealthy woman of good social standing—as the victim of events. Graeme Harper, writing in the Oxford Dictionary of National Biography in 2008, says the selection was made at random. The journalist and author Robert Chambers wrote in 1879 that there was a grudge between Mrs Tottenham and Hook and his friends, but provided no details. As of 2026 the site at 54 Berners Street is occupied by the Sanderson Hotel.

== See also ==
- List of practical joke topics
- Flash mob

== Notes and references ==
=== Sources ===
==== Books ====
- Chambers, Robert (1879). The Book of Days: A Miscellany of Popular Antiquities in Connection with the Calendar. Edinburgh: W. & R. Chambers. OCLC 831257631.
- Dunn, Bill Newton (1996). The Man who was John Bull: The Biography of Theodore Edward Hook, 1778–1841. London: Allendale Publishing. ISBN 978-0-9528277-0-2.
- Flanders, Judith (2013). The Victorian City: Everyday Life in Dickens' London. London: Atlantic Books. ISBN 978-1-8488-7797-9.
- Fone, Martin (2018). Fifty Scams and Hoaxes. Market Harborough, Leicestershire: Troubador Publishing. ISBN 978-1-7890-1577-5.
- Hide, John Ambrose (2019). Black Plaques London: Memorials to Misadventure. Stroud, Gloucestershire: The History Press. ISBN 978-0-7509-9117-9.
- Hook, Theodore Edward (1836). Gilbert Gurney. London: Whittaker. OCLC 4329129.
- Mayer, David (1969). Harlequin in his Element: The English Pantomime, 1806–1836. Cambridge, Massachusetts: Harvard University Press. OCLC 900844444. SBN 674-37275-1.
- White, Jerry (2007). London in the Nineteenth Century: 'A Human Awful Wonder of God'. London: Cape. ISBN 978-0-2240-6272-5.

==== Journals and magazines ====
- Davis, Jim (February 2013). "Disrupting the Quotidian: Hoaxes, Fires, and Non-theatrical Performance in Nineteenth-century London". New Theatre Quarterly. 29 (1): 3–12. doi:10.1017/S0266464X13000018.

==== News ====
- "A Hoax". The Times. 28 November 1810. p. 3.
- "Most Extraordinary Scene". The Morning Post. 28 November 1810. p. 3.
- "Untitled". The Morning Post. 29 November 1810. p. 3.

==== Websites ====
- Clark, Gregory (2023). "The Annual RPI and Average Earnings for Britain, 1209 to Present (New Series)". MeasuringWorth.
- Harper, Graeme (2008). "Hook, Theodore Edward". Oxford Dictionary of National Biography (online ed.). Oxford University Press. doi:10.1093/ref:odnb/13686. (Subscription, Wikipedia Library access or UK public library membership required.)
