= Theodore Hook =

English writer

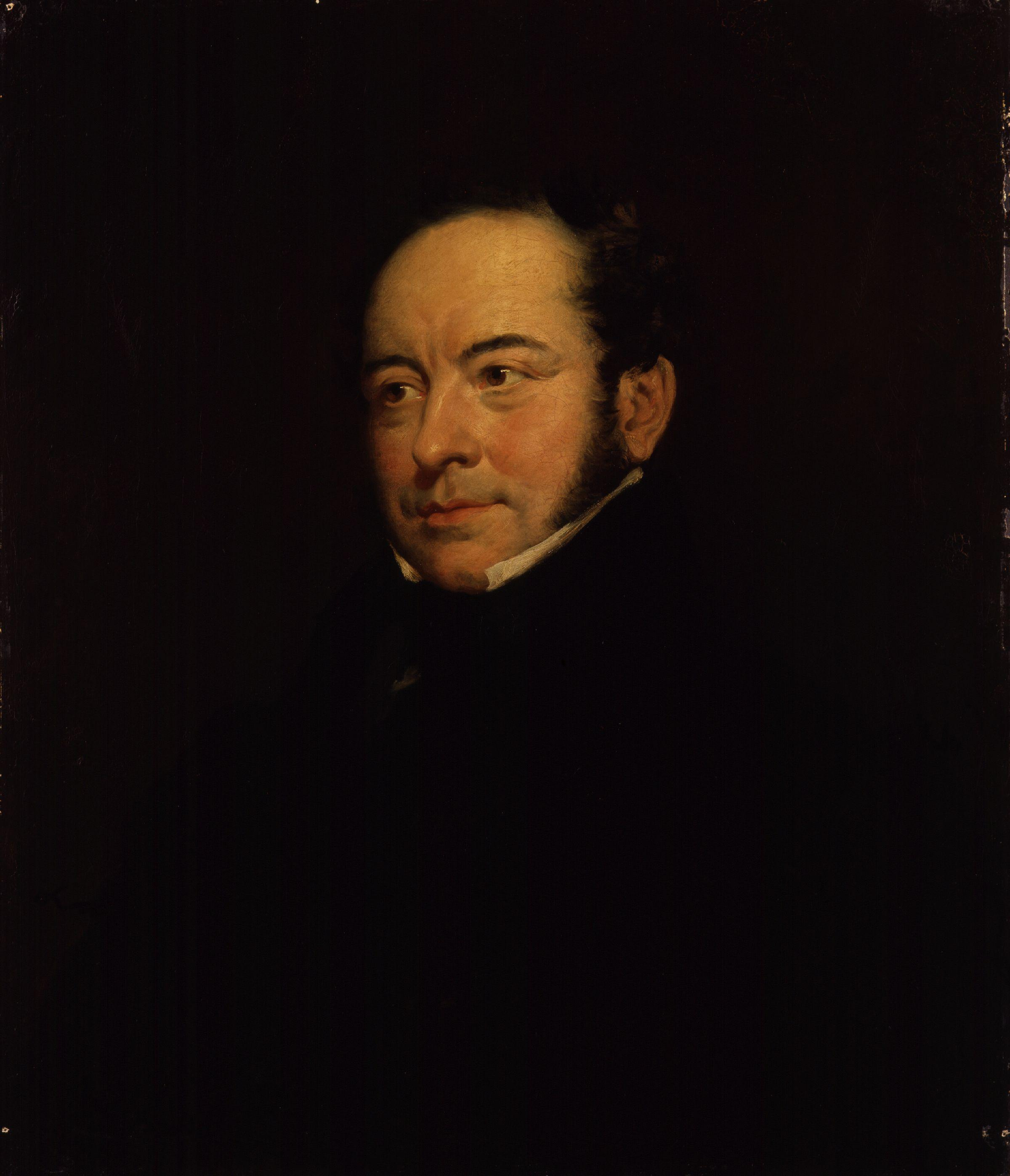
- Portrait by Eden Upton Eddis
- Born: 22 September 1788; London, England
- Died: 24 August 1841 (aged 52); London, England

Theodore Edward Hook (22 September 1788 – 24 August 1841) was an English writer, intellectual, prankster and civil servant. One of the first writers of the English fashionable novel, he is best known for his practical jokes, particularly the Berners Street hoax in 1810. The world's first postcard was received by Hook in 1840; he likely posted it to himself.

== Biography ==
=== Early life ===
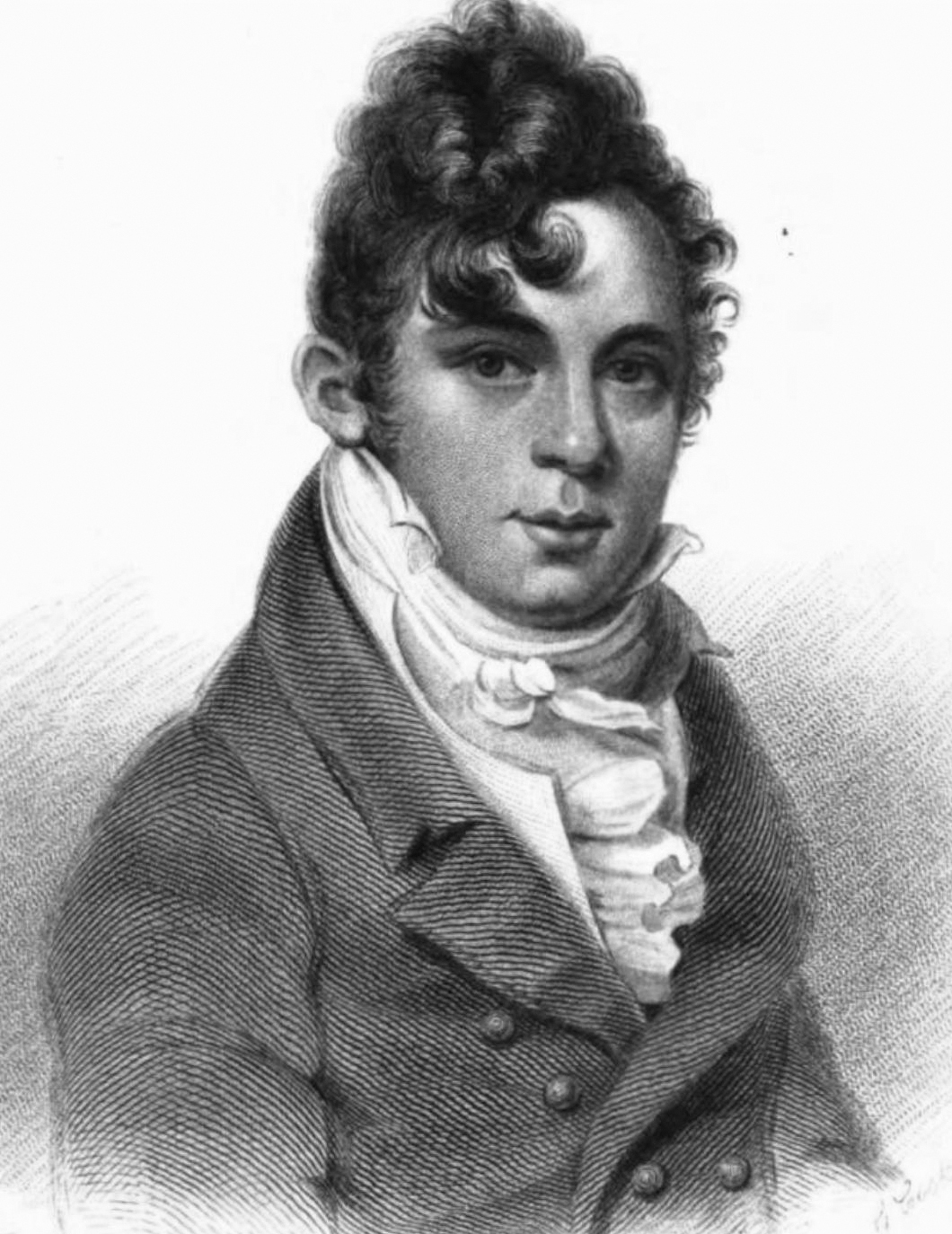
c. 1810 portrait of Hook

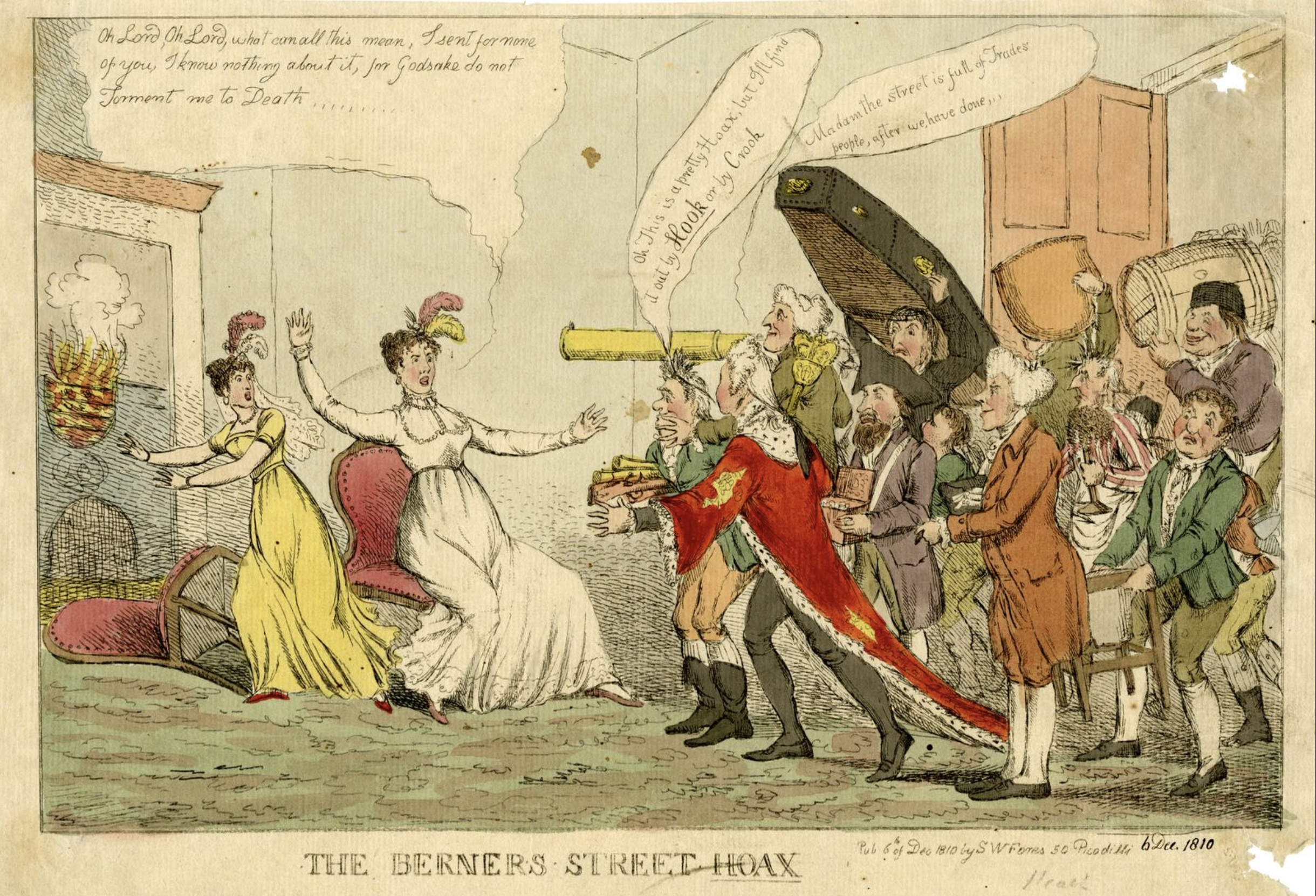
Caricature of the Berners Street hoax

Hook was born in Charlotte Street, Bedford Square, London. His father, James Hook (1746–1827), was a composer; his elder brother, also called James Hook (1771–1828), became Dean of Worcester. He spent a year at Harrow School and subsequently matriculated at the University of Oxford. At the age of 16, in conjunction with his father, he scored a dramatic success with The Soldier's Return, a comic opera, and it followed up with a series of popular ventures with John Liston and Charles Mathews, including Tekeli.

Hook then became a playboy and practical joker best known for the Berners Street hoax in 1810 in which he arranged for dozens of tradesmen, and notables such as the Lord Mayor of London, the Governor of the Bank of England, the Chairman of the East India Company and the Duke of Gloucester to visit Mrs Tottenham at 54 Berners Street to win a bet that he could transform any house in London into the most talked-about address within a week.

Another notable prank of Hook's was played on the actor Robert Coates a few years later. While Coates was performing at the Theatre Royal Haymarket, Hooks forged and hand-delivered an invitation from the Prince Regent to a party at Carlton House. Coates was initially invited in, but the invitation was found to be fake and he was turned away. Having sent off his carriage, he was obliged to wait at the Hackney carriage stand. The Prince, unwittingly involved in Hook's prank, regretted that Coates had been ejected, observing him to be an "inoffensive gentleman", and noting that "his presence might have amused many of the guests, and could have done harm to no one." Coates accepted an invitation to visit the next day. Hook seemed to regret the prank; he "never told the story without some signs of compunction."

=== Career ===
He took up residence at St Mary Hall, Oxford University, leaving after two terms to resume his former life. His gift of improvising songs charmed the Prince Regent, who appointed him accountant-general and treasurer of Mauritius with a salary of £2,000 a year (£142,325; US$194,771 in 2021 terms). He started his term in October 1813. In 1817, it was discovered that a sum of about £12,000 (£1,054,500; US$1.44 million in 2021 terms) had been extracted by a deputy official; Hook was put on trial and ultimately found guilty of negligence and held responsible for the missing amount.

In 1820, to repay the debt, he launched the newspaper John Bull, which championed Toryism. Though it had strong circulation, he failed to repay what he owed and was confined to a sponging-house from 1823 to 1825. While imprisoned, he wrote the nine volumes of stories afterwards collected under the title of Sayings and Doings (1824–1828). In the early 1820s, he helped the singer Michael Kelly compile his Reminiscences, which include details of working with Mozart. In the remaining 23 years of his life, he wrote novels, essays, and plays. His novels have frequent passages of racy narrative and vivid portraiture. They include Maxwell (1830), a portrait of his friend the Reverend E. Cannon; Love and Pride (1833); the autobiographical Gilbert Gurney (1835) and Gurney Married (1838); Jack Brag (1837) and Peregrine Bunce (1842). His last novel was Births, Marriages and Deaths (1839).

The world's oldest postcard was sent to Hook in 1840, bearing a Penny Black stamp. Hook probably created and posted the card to himself as a practical joke on the postal service, since the image is a caricature of workers in the post office. In 2002, the postcard sold for a record £31,750.

=== Later life and death ===
Hook died at home in Fulham on 24 August 1841 aged 52. His estate was seized by the Treasury. He never married but lived with Mary Anne Doughty; they had six children.

Hook is remembered as one of the most brilliant figures of Georgian times. He inspired the characters of Lucian Gay in Benjamin Disraeli's novel Coningsby and Mr Wagg in Thackeray's Vanity Fair. His style was parodied by the Smith brothers in Rejected Addresses (1812). Samuel Taylor Coleridge praised him as being "as true a genius as Dante".

== Novels ==
- The Man of Sorrow (1808)
- Maxwell (1830)
- Love and Pride (1833)
- The Parson's Daughter (1833)
- Gilbert Gurney (1836)
- Jack Brag (1837)
- Gurney Married: A Sequel to Gilbert Gurney (1838)
- All in the Wrong; or, Births, Deaths, and Marriages (1839)
- Precepts and Practice (1840)
- Fathers and Sons (1842)
- Peregrine Bunce; or, Settled at Last (1842)
