= William Lambe (philanthropist) =

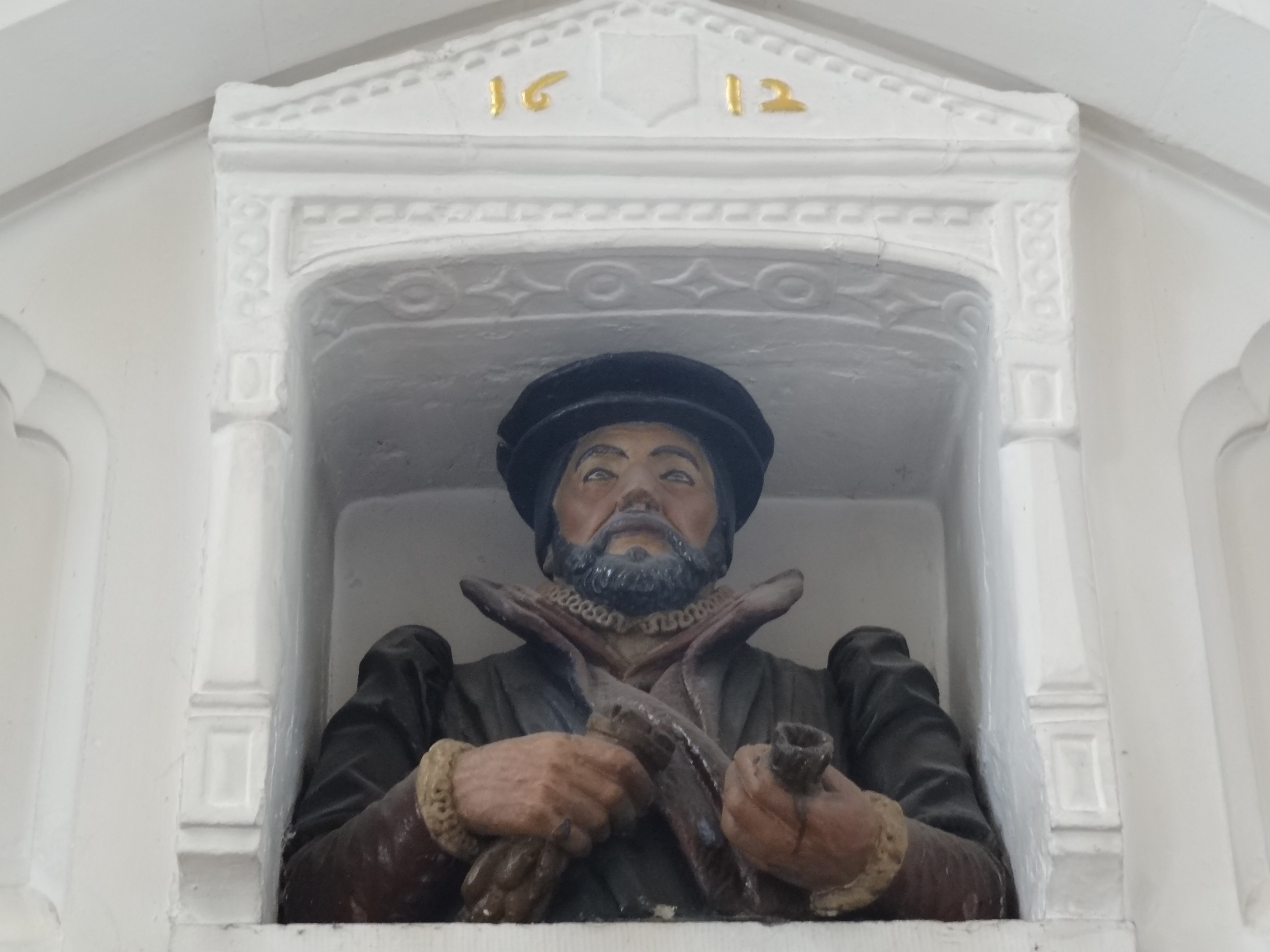
Effigy of William Lambe in St James' Church, Islington

William Lambe (1495–1580) was a wealthy cloth merchant in the City of London during Tudor times who engaged in a wide range of philanthropic deeds, most notably endowing the construction of St James' Church, Islington, the construction of the eponymous Lamb's Conduit, traces of which remain in a number of London street names, and the endowment of Sutton Valence School. He was a devout protestant and was friends with a number of notable protestant clerics of the time.

== Biography ==
William Lambe was a London cloth merchant and philanthropist, was born at Sutton Valence, Kent, in 1495. According to Abraham Fleming, his contemporary biographer, Lambe rose from "a mean estate" in the countryside to become a gentleman of the Chapel Royal to Henry VIII. He was admitted a freeman of the Clothworkers' Company in 1568, and served as master in 1569-70.

In early life he lived in London Wall, next to the ancient hermitage chapel of St James's, belonging to the abbey of Gerendon in Leicestershire. Two monks of this community served the chapel as chaplains. A well belonging to them supplied its name to the adjoining Monkwell Street and Monkwell Square. Through his influence with the king, Lambe purchased this chapel at the dissolution of the monasteries, by letters patent dated 30 March 34 Henry VIII (1542), and bequeathed it with his house, lands, and tenements, to the value of £30 yearly, to the Company of Clothworkers. Out of this he directed that a minister should be engaged to perform divine service in his chapel every Sunday, Wednesday, and Friday throughout the year, and to preach four sermons yearly before the members of the company, who were to attend in their gowns. The company were also to provide clothing for twenty-four poor men and women, and received £4 yearly from the trust for their pains. Today there stands a plaque at 8-10, Moorgate, London, EC2 commemorating the fact that the land on which the property stands was in 1580 bequeathed by William Lambe to the Company of Clothworkers.

Lambe's chapel, with the almshouses adjoining, was pulled down in 1825, and in 1872, under the William Lambe's Chapel and Estate Act 1872 (35 & 36 Vict. c. cliv), the chapel was finally removed to Prebend Square, Islington, where the present church of St James' was erected. At the west end of the church is a bust of the founder in his livery gown, with a purse in one hand and his gloves in the other (see photo). It bears the date 1612, and was removed from the chapel in London Wall. The William Lambe Trust survives to this day and helps provide for the maintenance of St James' Church, Islington.

Lambe also built, at his own expense, a conduit in Holborn, to provide a water supply to the Charterhouse, and provided 120 buckets to enable poor women to gain a living by selling water. In 1577 Lambe paid £1,500 to renovate an old conduit house at Oldbourne Crosse, Snow Hill dating from 1498, using lead pipes to supply water from a dammed tributary of the River Fleet and adjacent springs via Leather Lane, although the importance of the conduit diminished when the New River opened in 1613 and the conduit was demolished in 1746. A public pump provided from this conduit in the vicinity of Long Yard gave its name to Lamb's Conduit Street, Lamb’s Conduit Passage and Lamb's Conduit Field, as well as to the nearby pub, The Lamb. Although the conduit has been gone for 200 years, there remains a stone plaque set into the wall at the entrance to Long Yard which reads: "Lamb's Conduit, the property of the City of London. This pump was erected for the benefit of the Publick [sic]"

He also left an annuity of £6 13s. 4d. to the Stationers' Company, to be distributed to the poor in St Faith's parish, besides other benefactions to St Giles', Cripplegate, Christ's and St Thomas's Hospitals, and the city prisons.

For his native town of Sutton Valence he established in 1578, at his own expense, a free grammar school for the education of youth, providing a yearly allowance of £20 for the master and £10 for the usher, besides a good house and garden for the accommodation of the former. He also erected in the village of Town Sutton six almshouses, with an orchard and gardens, for the comfort of six poor inhabitants of that parish, and allotted the sum of £2 to be paid to each of them yearly, entrusting the Company of Clothworkers with the estates and direction of these charities.

He died 21 April 1580, and was buried in the church of St Faith under St Paul's. His tomb, which was destroyed with the church of St Faith in the Great Fire of London, bore a brass plate with figures of himself in armour and his three wives. His epitaph is printed by both William Camden and William Dugdale and ran thus:

As I was so be ye,
As I am ye shall be:
That I gave, that I have,
That I spent, that I had:
Thus I end all my cost,
That I left, that I lost.

The names of his wives were Joan, Alice, and Joan. The last survived him, and was buried in St. Olave's Church.

Lambe was a strong adherent of the protestant faith and a friend of renowned protestant clerics Alexander Nowell and John Foxe. He was widely recognised for his piety and benevolence, and, according to his biographer, “hath bene seene and marked at Powle's crosse to haue [sic] continued from eight of the clocke until eleuen, attentiuely listening to the Preachers voice, and to haue endured the ende, being weake and aged, when others both strong and lustie went away.”
