= St James' Church, Islington =

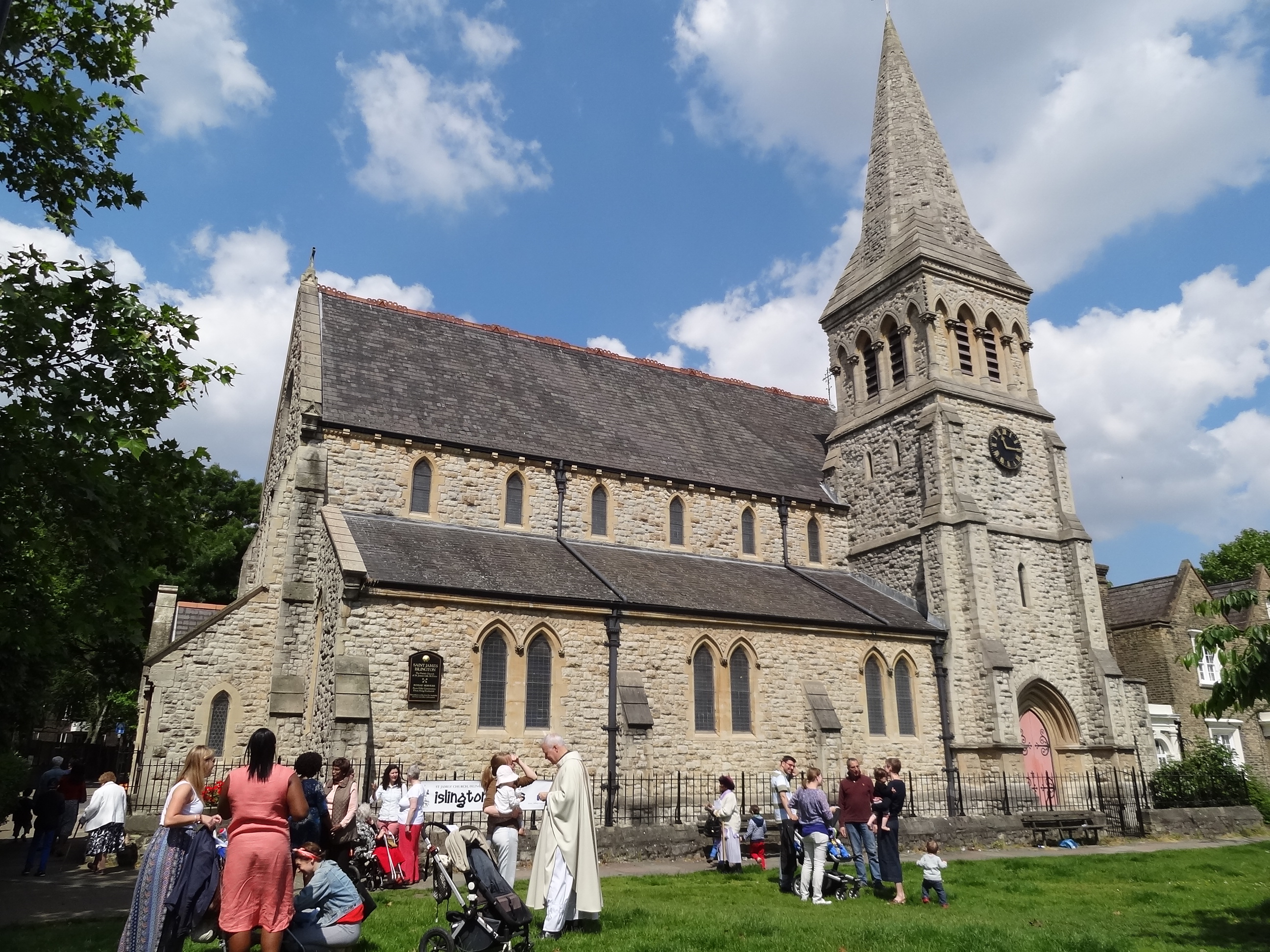
- St James' Church, Islington
- 51.5371°N 0.0958°W
- Location: Islington, London, N1 8PF
- Country: England
- Denomination: Church of England
- Previous denomination: Roman Catholic
- Churchmanship: Modern Catholic
- Website: Church website

History
- Status: Active

Architecture
- Functional status: Parish church
- Architect: F. W. Porter

Administration
- Province: Canterbury
- Diocese: London
- Archdeaconry: Hackney
- Deanery: Islington
- Parish: Islington St James with St Peter

Clergy
- Bishop: Right Revd Joanne Grenfell
- Vicar: Mthr Helen Simms-Williams

St James' Church, Islington, is a parish church in the inner London borough of Islington. It is located on Prebend Street between Essex Road and the New North Road. The parish is bounded by Essex Road between the New North Road and Upper Street, Upper Street to The Angel, Islington, City Road to Wharf Road, Wharf Road to the Regent's Canal, and the Regent's Canal to the New North Road.

== History ==
The Clothworkers' Company of the City of London built St James' Church, Islington to serve the surrounding Packington housing estate. The church was consecrated in 1875 and the surrounding estate had been built by around 1850. The land on which the church and the rest of the estate were built originally belonged to St Paul's Cathedral (hence St Paul's Street, Mary Street, Bishop's Street, Canon Street, Prebend Street and so on) but these 'prebends' were stripped from the cathedral at the time of the Reformation and were sold to the Clothworkers' Company, which shortly afterwards were bequeathed an additional 60 acres of land by Dame Ann Packington on her death in 1563, which had been used for archery practice. The Clothworkers paid £8,400 for the construction of the church, Lady Burdett-Coutts paid for a set of bells and individual members of the Clothworkers paid for the stained glass including members of the Heysham Wood family. The full name for the church is St James' with St Peter and St Philip, Islington as the parish includes that of the former St Phillip's the Evangelist, Arlington Square, which was consecrated in 1857 but which was demolished in 1954 after a falling congregation made it redundant and that of St Peter which was located in Devonia Road but which was closed in 1981

The church was built as the successor to Lambe's Chapel, formerly St James in the Wall, in Monkswell Street in the City of London, which had been built as a hermitage during the reign of King Henry III. Following the dissolution of the monasteries, William Lambe acquired St James in the Wall on 30 March 1543, became Master of the Company of Clothworkers in 1569 and in 1574 bequeathed the chapel to the Clothworkers' Company. Almshouses attached to the original Lambe's Chapel were pulled down in 1825 and replacements built on the Clothworkers Estate in Islington. In 1872 Lambe's Chapel itself was demolished and its successor, St James' Church, Islington, was built adjacent to the new almshouses, although the original chapel's crypt was moved to All Hallows Staining.

The church was designed by the Clothworkers' Company's architect, F. W. Porter. It is built in the style of 13th century French gothic, and Pevsner's architectural guide notes the "Good E[ast] window by Lavers & Baraud" at St James' Church, Islington, and that the window in the north chapel contains "four Flemish roundels, from Lambe's Chapel". Today the west wall of St James' Church, Islington contains a half figure of William Lambe, dated 1612, after whom Lambe's chapel was named. The British Museum has a watercolour sketch dated 15 May 1851 of the same half figure of William Lambe from when it was located in the "Chapel of the Clothworkers' Almshouses, Cripplegate".

On 14 December 2018 the church was used to film a short sequel to Four Weddings and a Funeral for Comic Relief which was aired on BBC Television in the UK on Red Nose Day, Friday 15 March 2019. The piece featured, amongst others, Rowan Atkinson, Hugh Grant, Lily James and Kristin Scott-Thomas.

On 16 December 2018 the church was visited by a 'mystery worshipper' from the Ship of Fools website who gave the church a broadly positive write-up, rating the sermon 8/10 and the likelihood of a making a return visit 7/10.

In early 2023 a major refurbishment and enhancement of the church's organ was completed by Paul Mortier of MPOS. The organ was originally installed in 1885 by Gray and Davison.

== Present day ==
Today the Islington Proms organisation holds an annual series of mainly classical concerts exclusively at St James' Church, Islington.

On Mondays an organisation called Pack Up, which is affiliated with the church, provides lunch in the church hall for anyone who wishes to attend.

The church is in the Islington deanery in the archdeaconery of Hackney in the Stepney area of the Diocese of London.

The congregation of St James' Church, Islington is extremely diverse, reflecting the community in which it is based. A part of the Church of England, the style of worship is 'modern catholic', with a balance of familiar and more contemporary hymns.

== Gallery ==
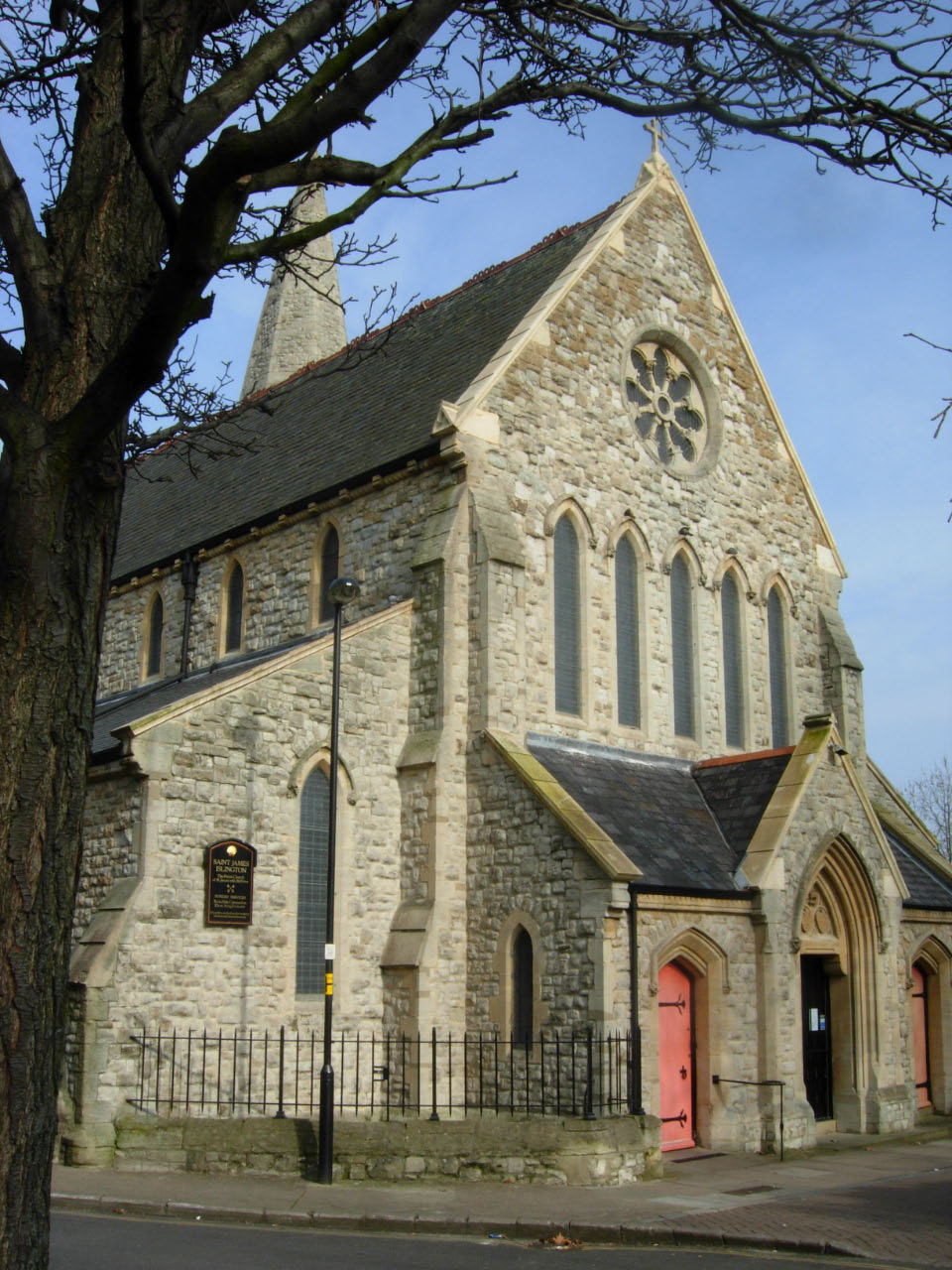
Church from the south-west

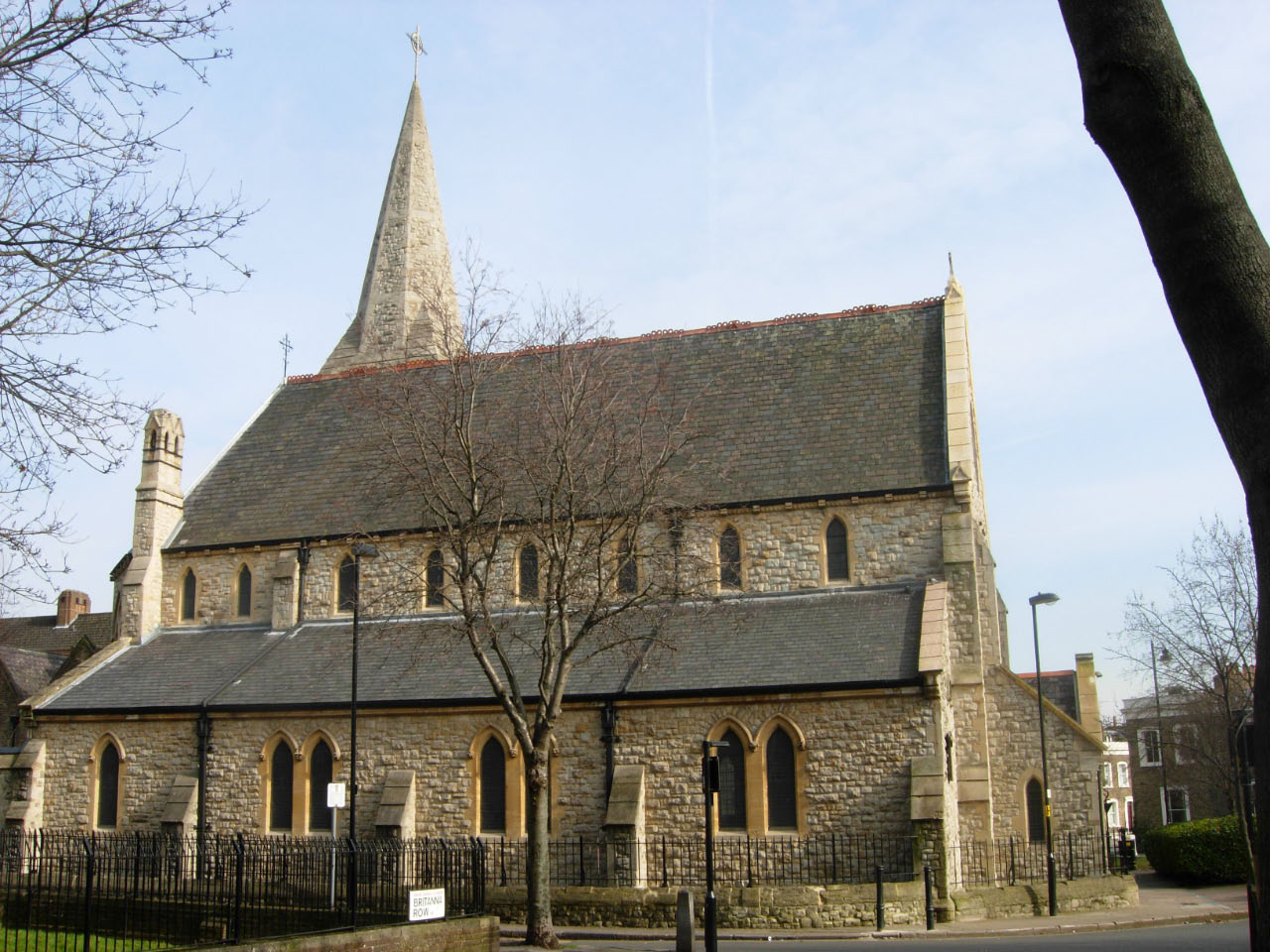
Church from the west

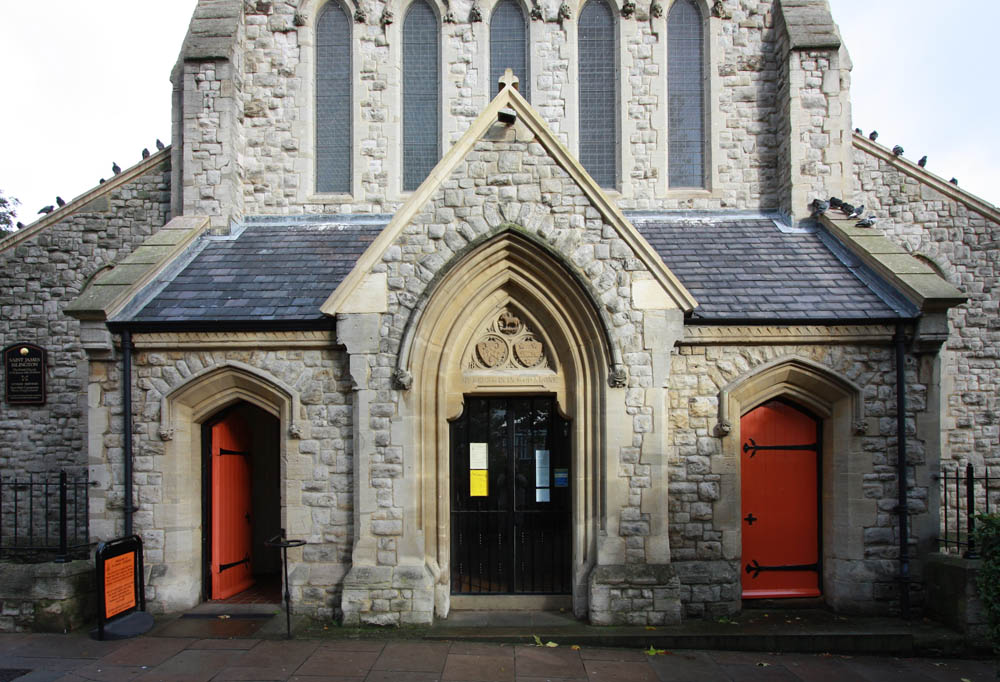
West entrance

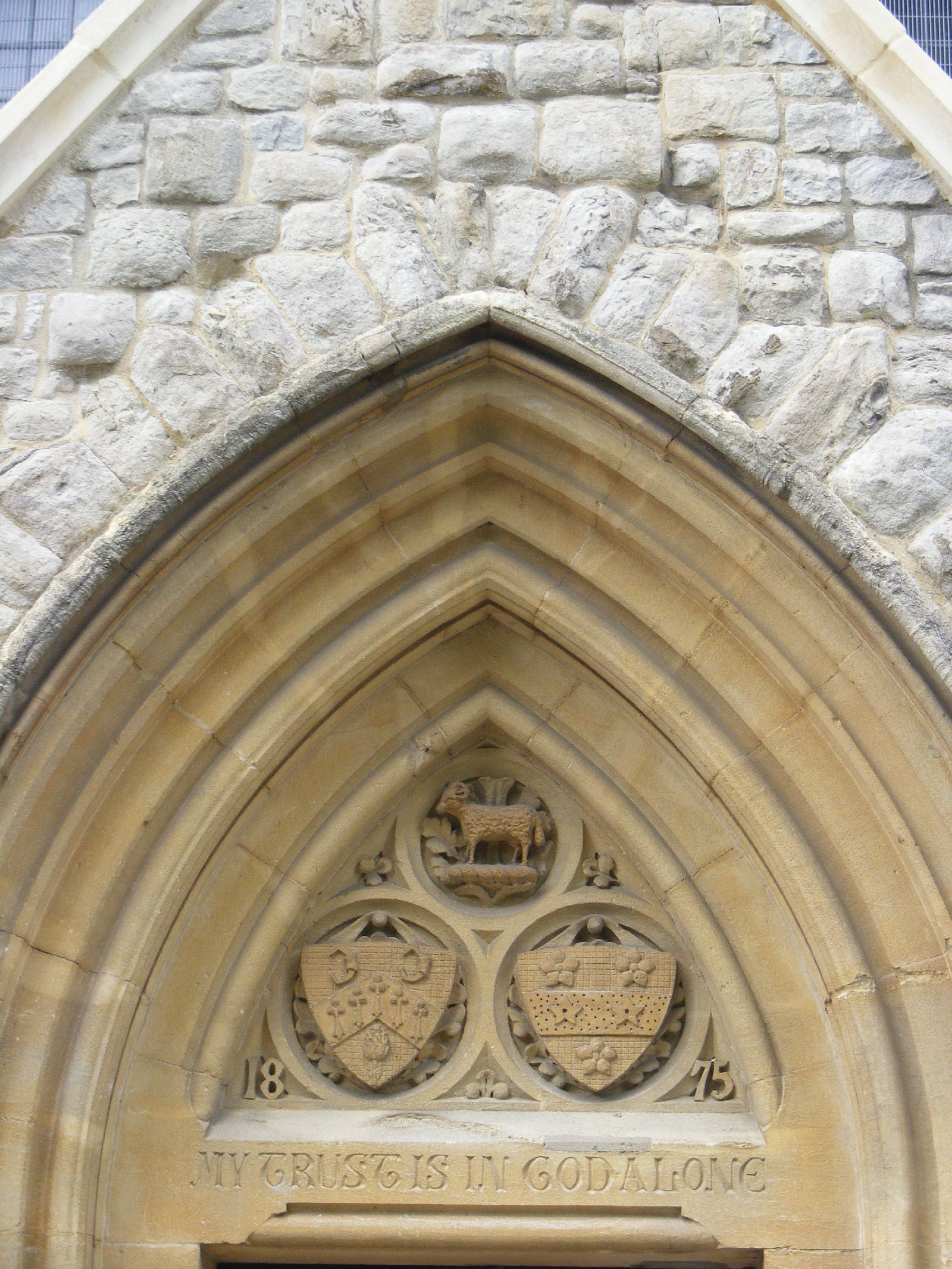
Coat of arms of Clothworkers Company over the entrance

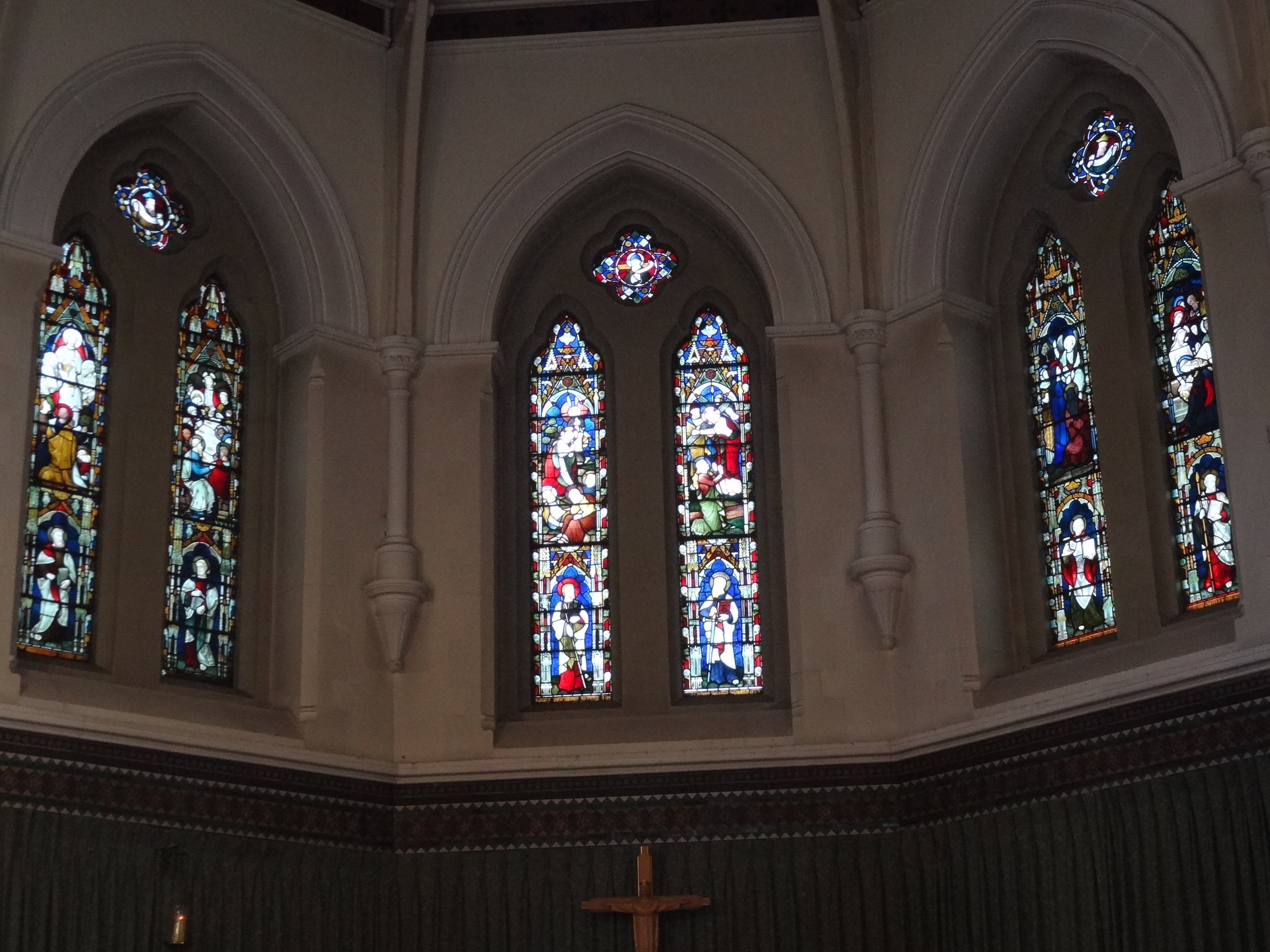
East window of St James's Church

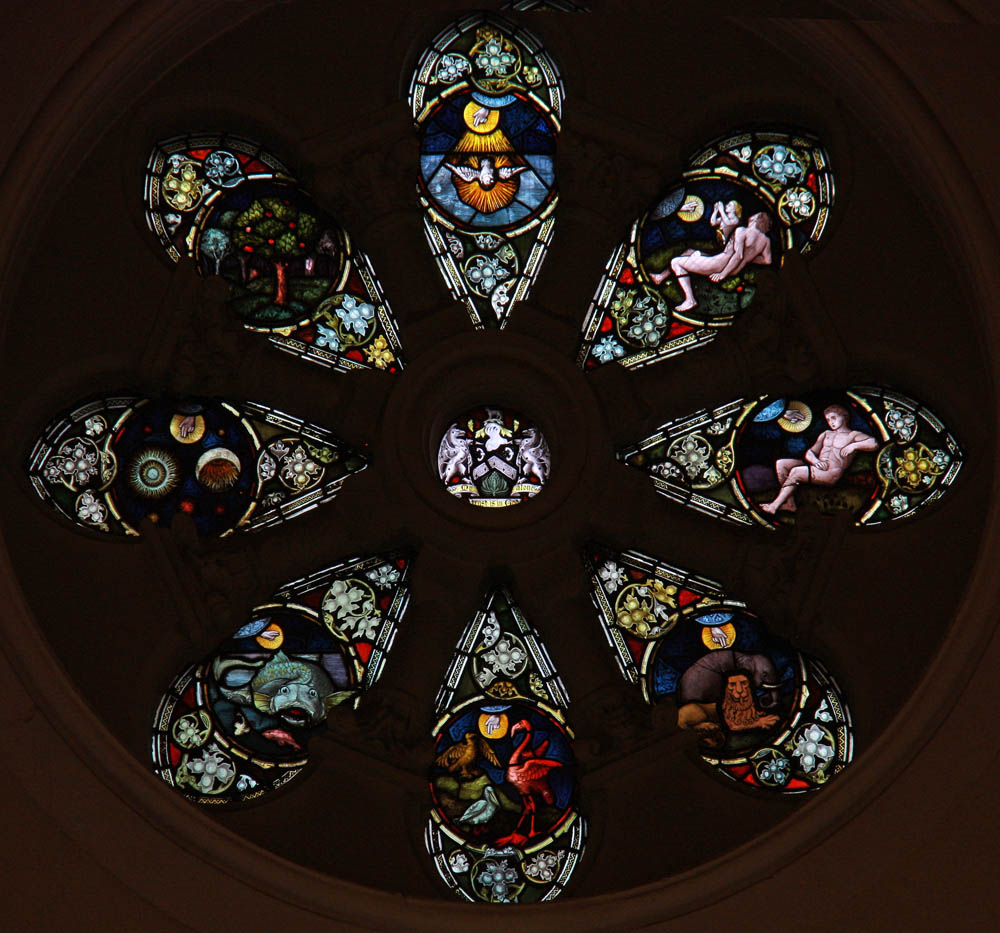
West window of St James's Church

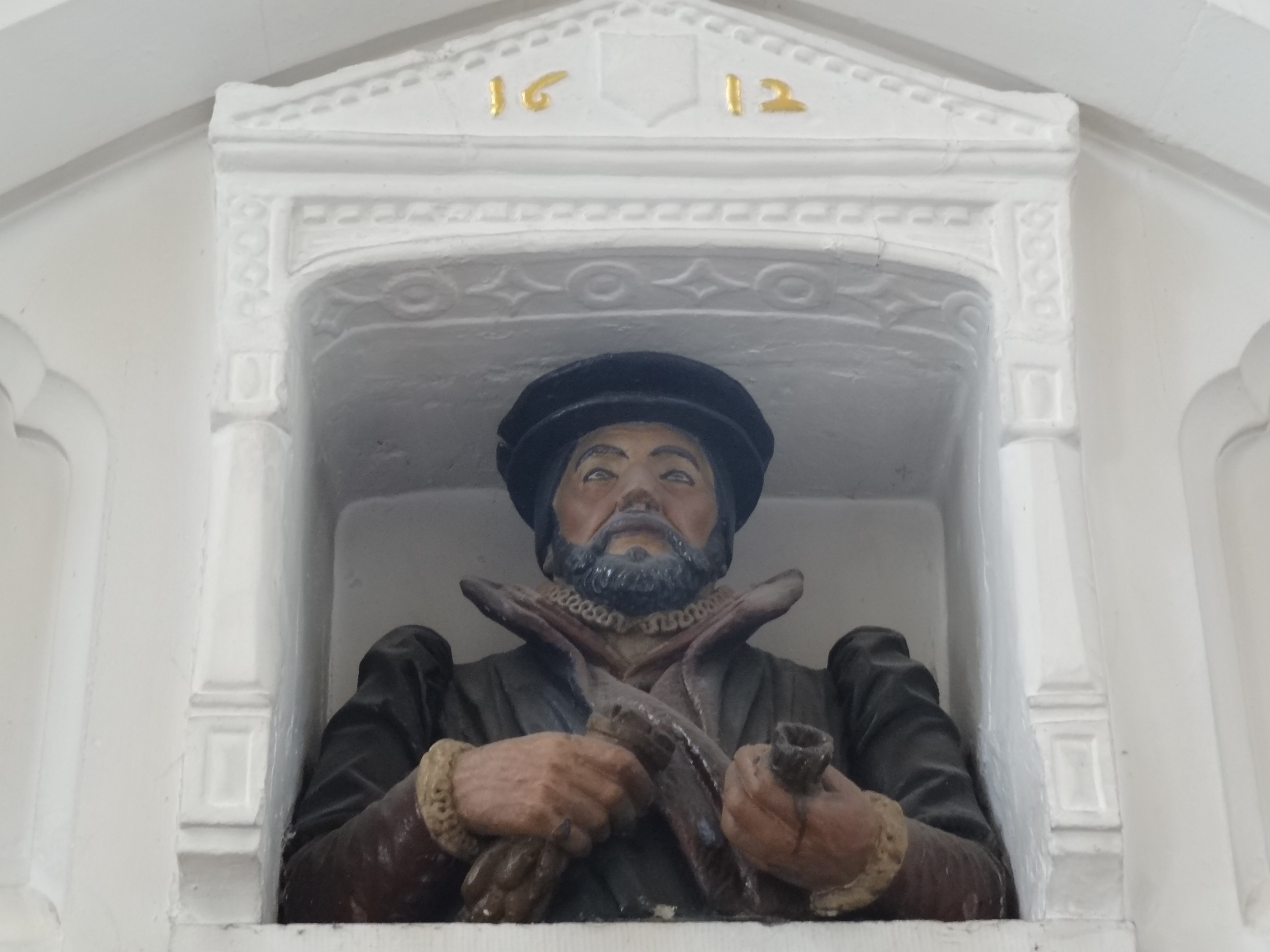
Effigy of William Lambe in St James' Church

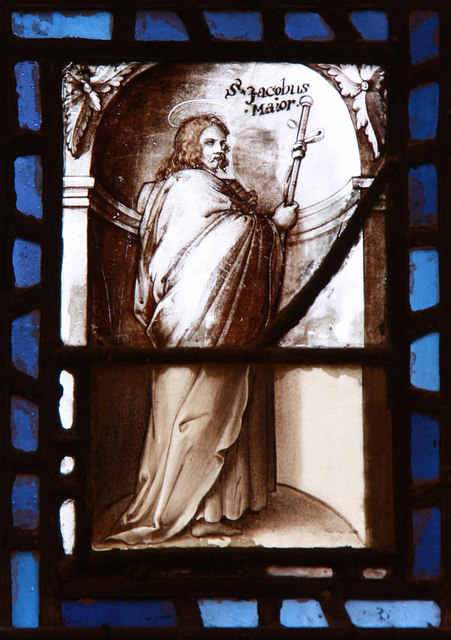
Saint James the Greater, the church's patron, on a window in the church

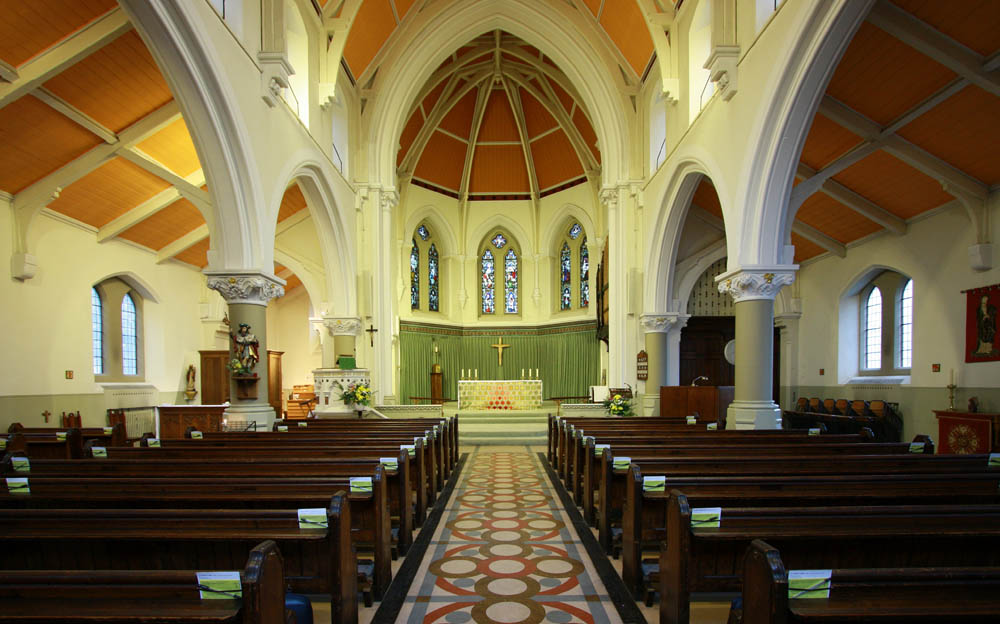
Nave of church looking east

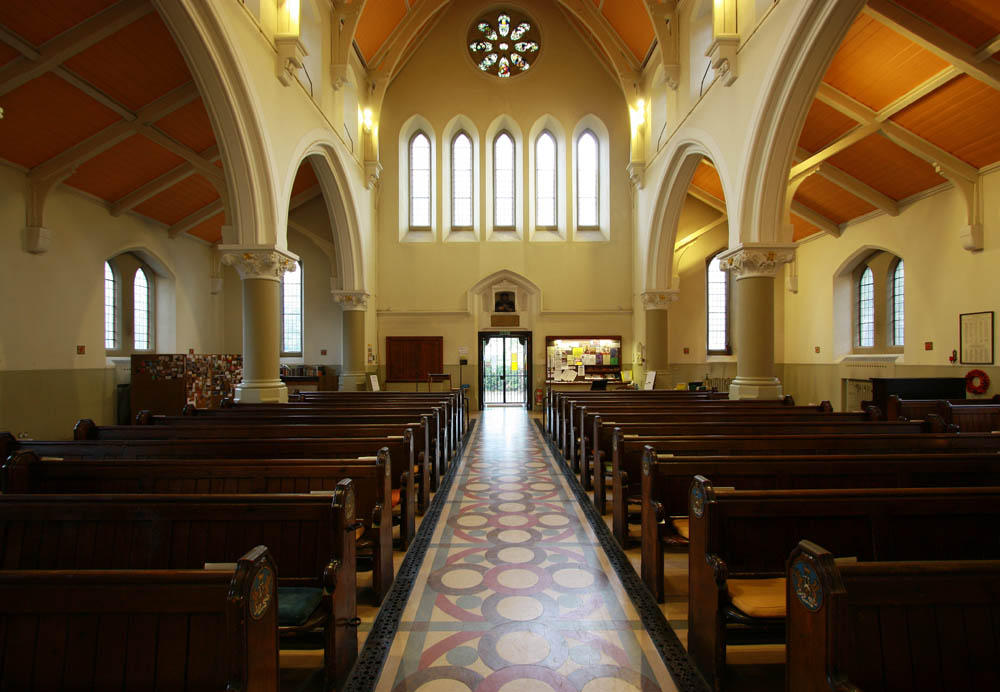
Nave of church looking west

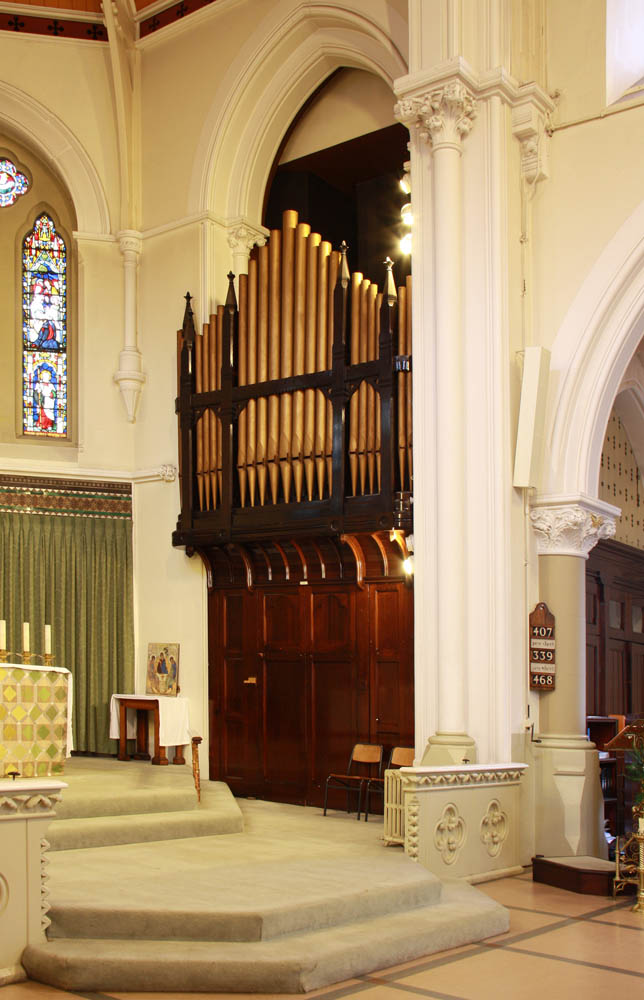
Organ

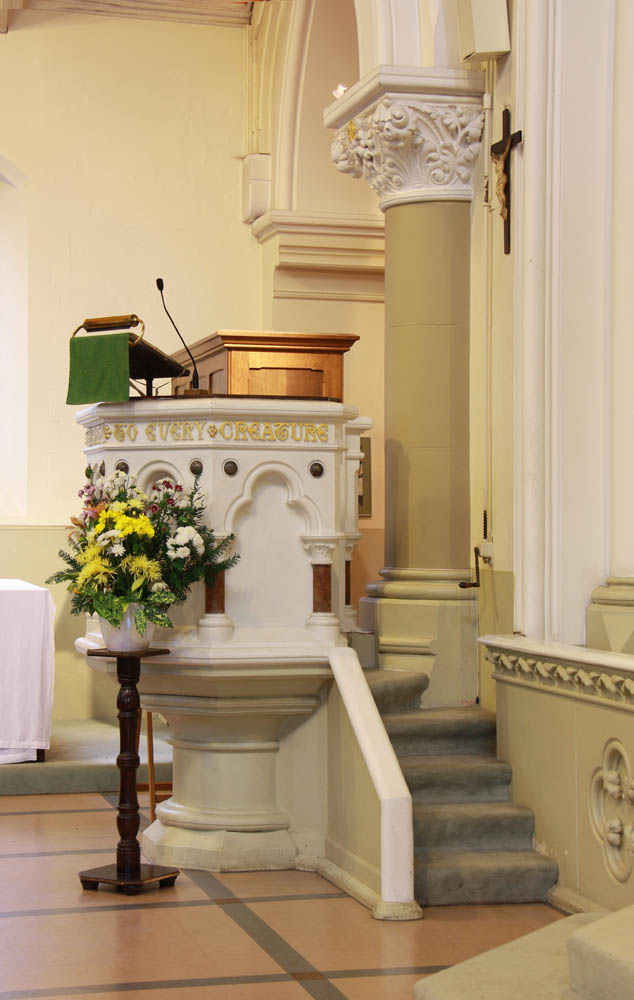
Pulpit

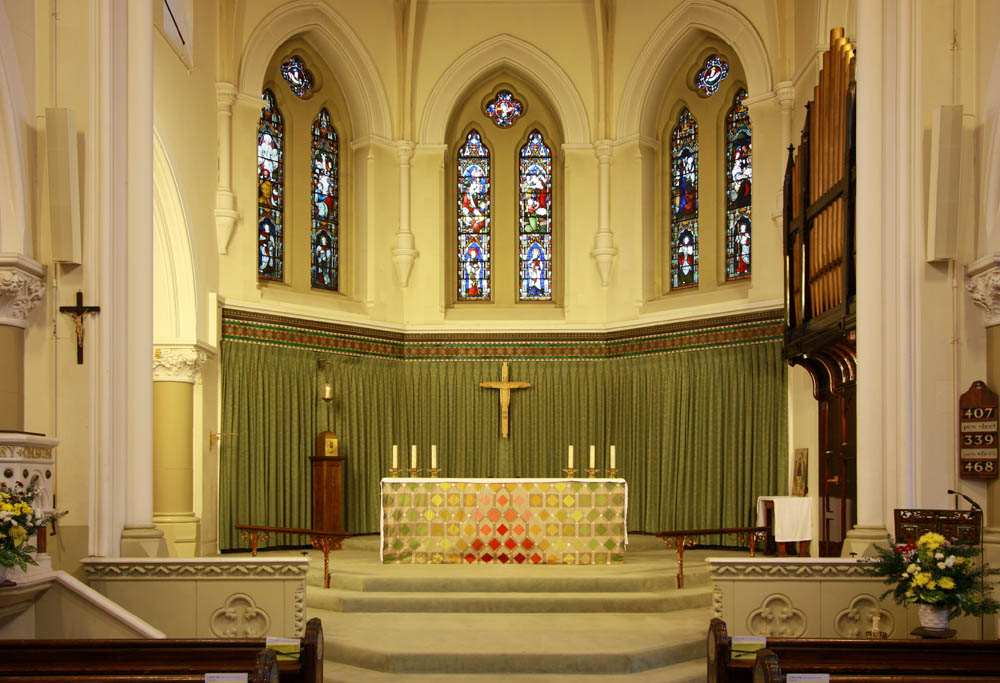
Altar and chancel

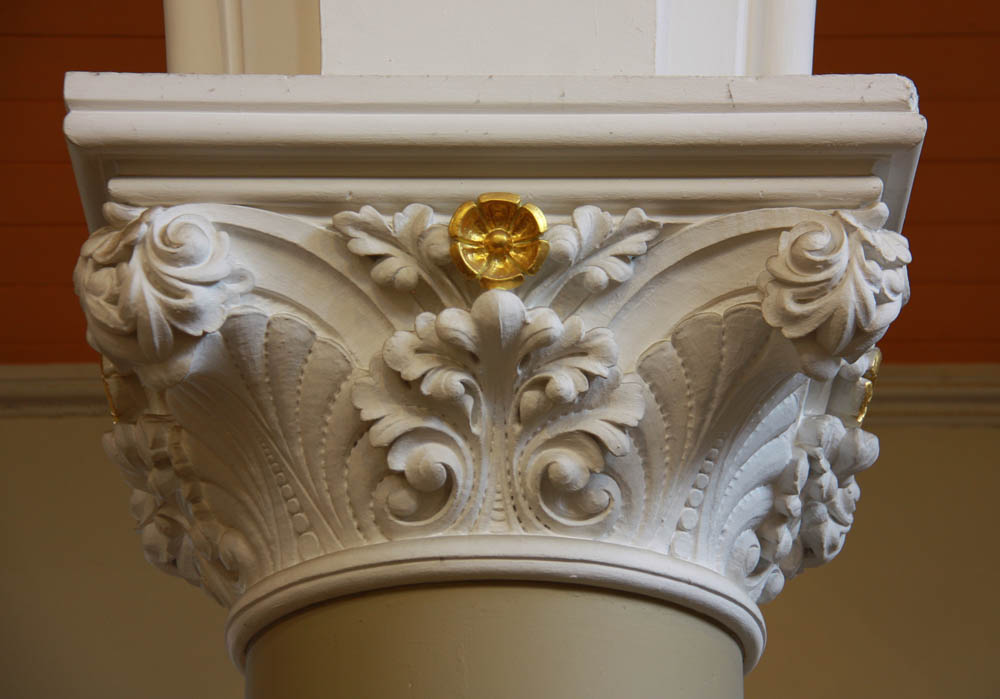
Capital in the church
