= Eastcastle Street =

Street in the City of Westminster, London

Coordinates: 51.5165°N 0.1383°W

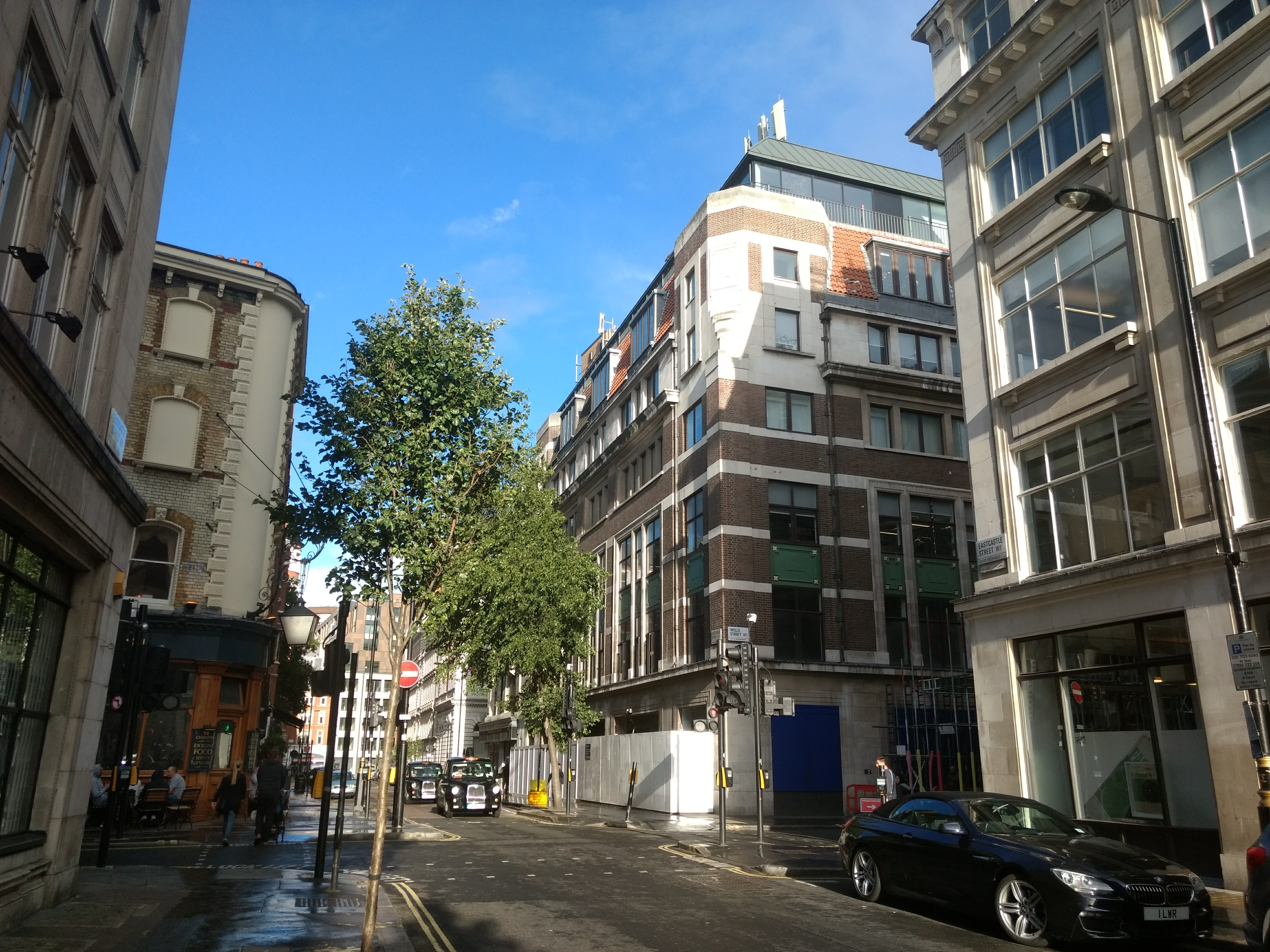
Eastcastle Street, east end.

Eastcastle Street is a street in the City of Westminster. It runs from Newman Street in the east to Great Titchfield Street in the west. It is crossed by Berners Street and Wells Street. Winsley Street runs from its south side. Berners Mews joins it on the north side and Berners Place on the south.

It was originally named Castle Street and continued as Great Castle Street beyond Oxford Market square (now Market Place).

It was the site of the Eastcastle Street robbery.

== Notable buildings ==
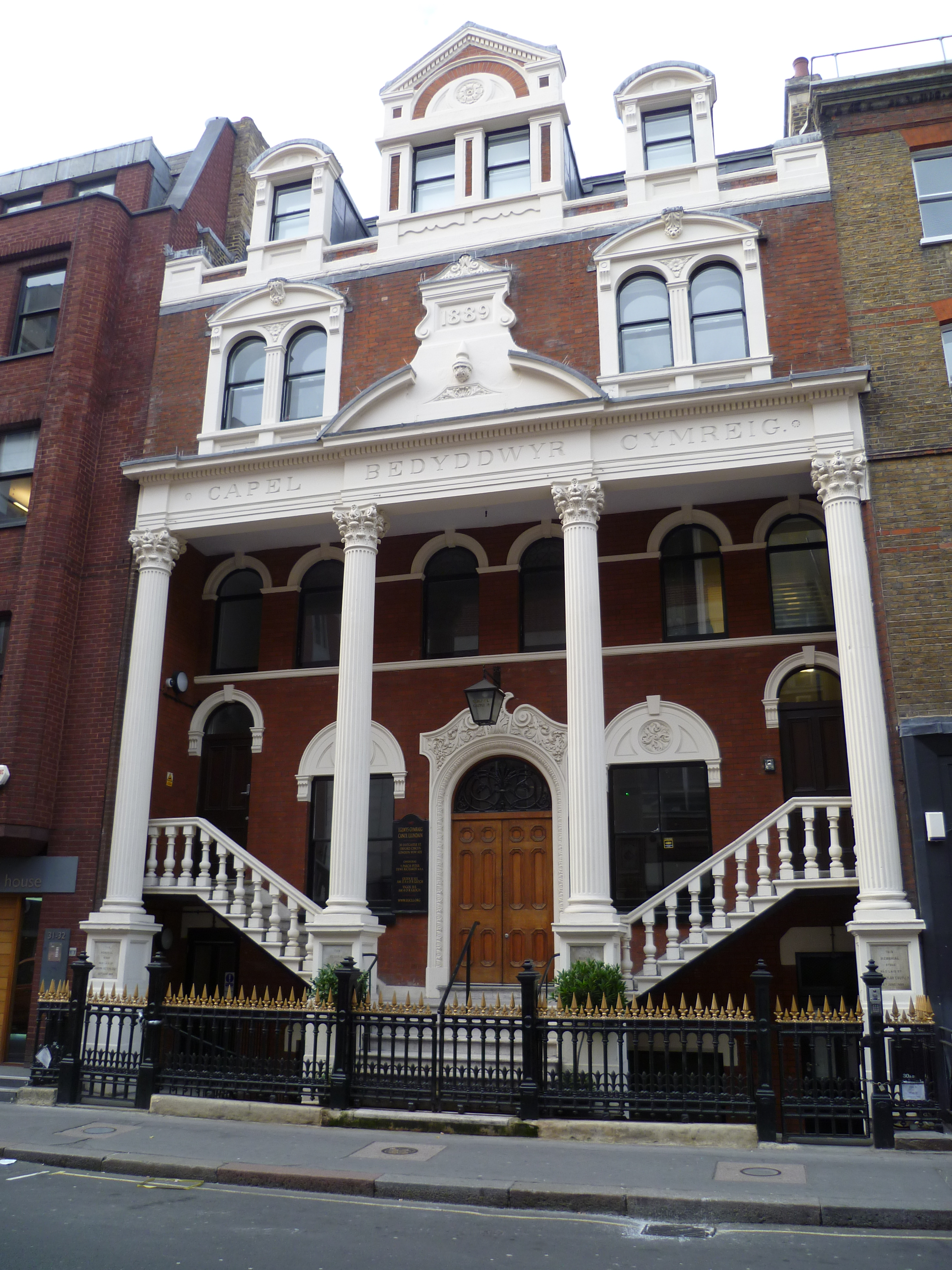
The Welsh Church of Central London

It contains listed buildings:

- The Champion public house.
- The Welsh Church of Central London.
- The Berners Hotel (faces Berners Street).
- United Kingdom House (facade fronts Oxford Street).

It is also the location of the Getty Images gallery.
