= Newman Street =

Street in the City of Westminster, London

Coordinates: 51.5172°N 0.1354°W

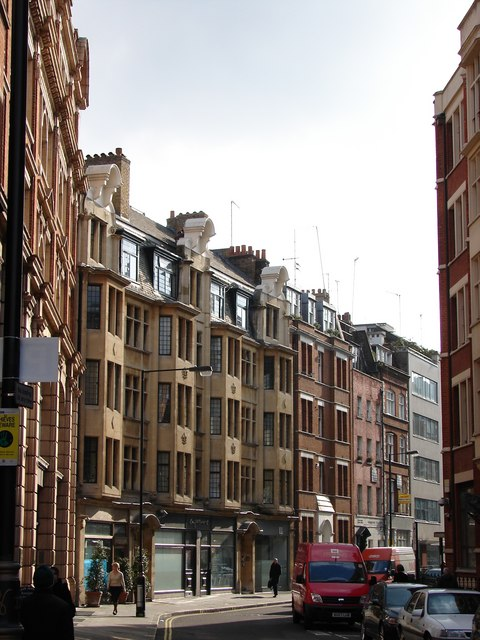
Newman Street looking south

Newman Street is a street in the City of Westminster. It runs from the junction of Mortimer Street, Cleveland Street, and Goodge Street in the north to Oxford Street in the south and is joined on its western side by Eastcastle Street.

== Notable buildings ==
The former Dickie Fitz restaurant is at number 48 on the corner with Goodge Street.

It contains a number of listed buildings:

- No. 33 on the eastern side.
- Nos 27 to 29 on the eastern side.
- No. 73 on the western side.
