= Dickie Fitz =

Coordinates: 51.5188°N 0.1367°W

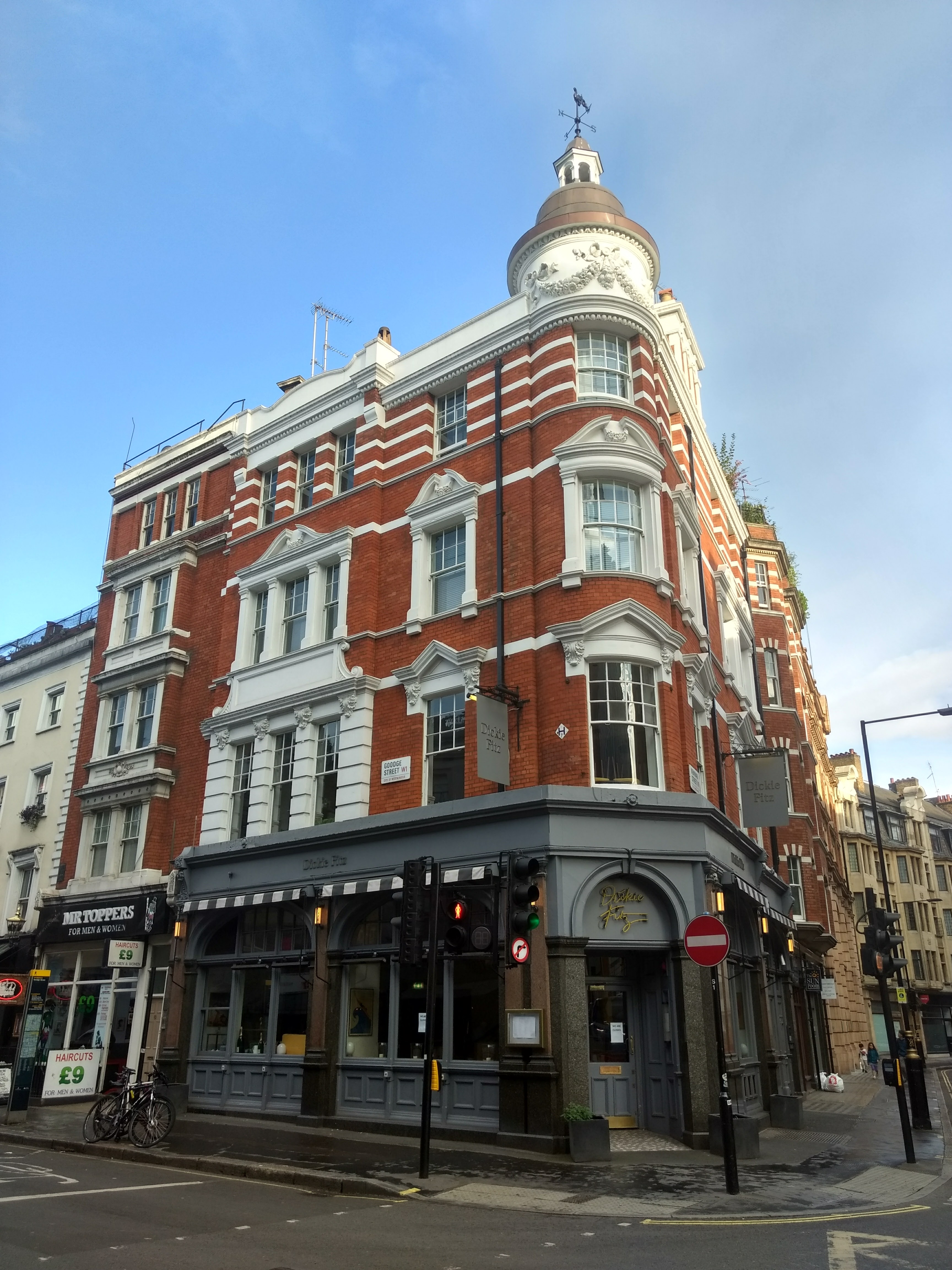
- Interactive map of Dickie Fitz

Restaurant information
- Established: 1899
- Closed: June 2017
- Location: London, United Kingdom

Dickie Fitz was a restaurant in a former pub at 48 Newman Street on the corner with Goodge Street in the City of Westminster, London. It closed in June 2017. It had traded under that name for about one year as an Australian-themed restaurant but had previously been the home to restaurants Ping Pong and the Newman Street Tavern.

It was built in 1899 on a site where there has been a pub since the 1780s. Previous pub names include The Oxford and Cambridge, The Cambridge Stores, The Cambridge Arms, and Garrick's Head. The "Cambridge coffee house" is recorded on the site in local directories of 1841 and 1856.
