= The People's Supermarket =

British supermarket and community interest company based in Holborn, London

Coordinates: 51.5226°N 0.1189°W

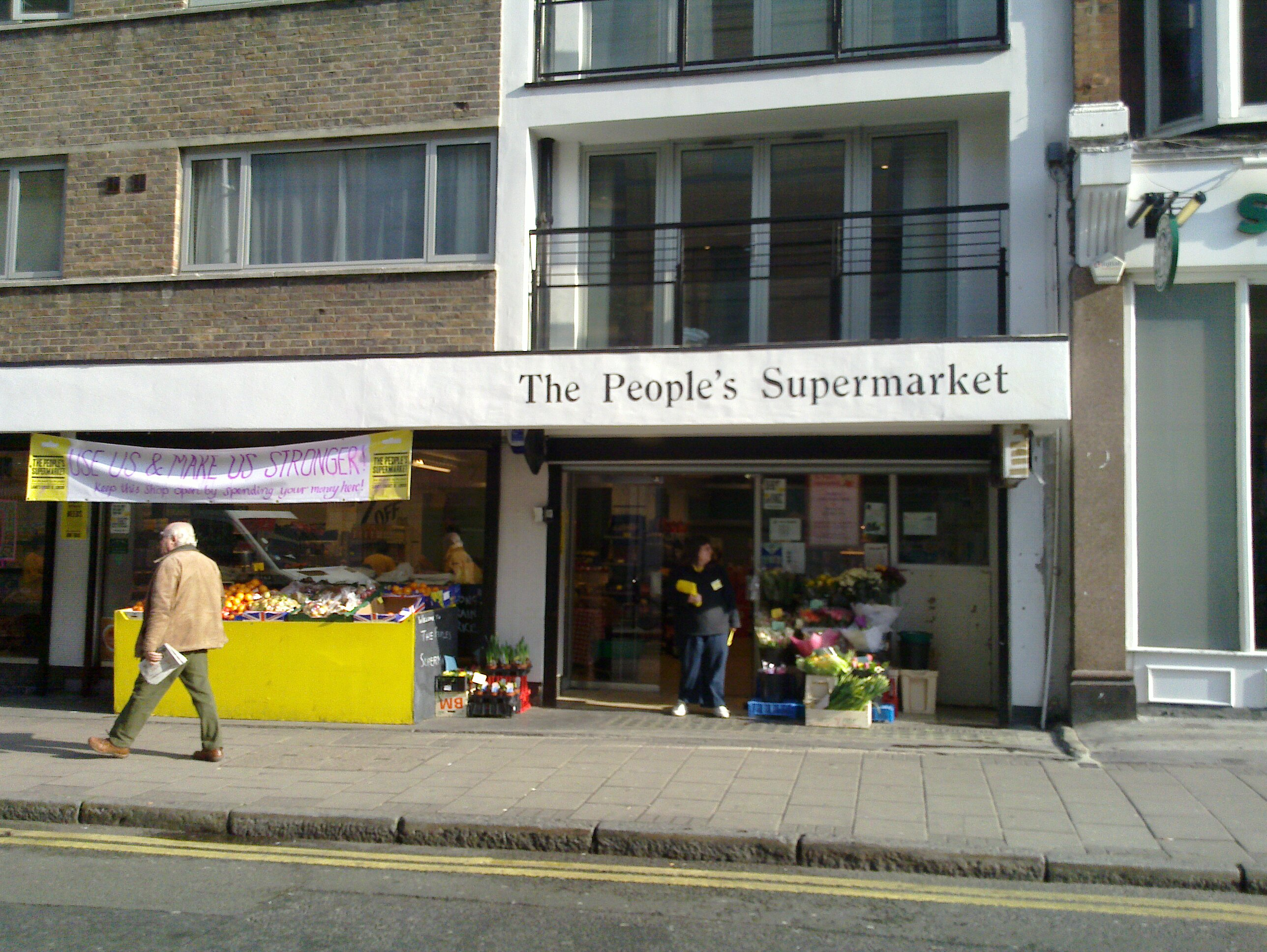
- Genre: Supermarket
- Founded: 2010
- Headquarters: London, United Kingdom
- Website: www.thepeoplessupermarket.org

The People's Supermarket is a community interest company whose stated aim is to provide the local community with good cheap food that is fair to consumers and producers. It was founded in May 2010 by Arthur Potts Dawson with regeneration advisor/entrepreneur David Barrie and retail specialist Kate Wickes-Bull, supported by a team of supporters and professional advisors, in Lamb's Conduit Street, Holborn, London, England, near Great Ormond Street Hospital. As of February 2012 it had 1000 members.

Based upon the concept of the food co-operative and inspired in part by the Park Slope Food Coop in the Park Slope neighbourhood of Brooklyn in New York City, members of the social enterprise are required to pay a £25 annual fee and contribute four hours of their time every four weeks to working in the store. In return, members receive a 20% discount off their shopping in-store.

== History ==
The People's Supermarket was opened May 2010, designed to enable healthy food to be supplied to an inner city urban community at affordable prices and inspired by peoples' willingness to exchange their time for other value. It was founded as a cooperative and changed its legal status in September 2013 to a community interest company.

The supermarket provides the area of Holborn, London, with a unique combination of grocery store, production kitchen and events, such as supper clubs. It formed part of and supported the development of Lamb's Conduit Street, Holborn, which has featured the arrival of independent fashion shops and a branch of global brand J.Crew.

For its innovative approach to food, community involvement and local development, the venture has won several awards, including Future Minds Award for Innovation (2011) and an Observer Ethical Award (2011).

The venture was supported at start-up by many organisations, including the London Borough of Camden, Esmée Fairbairn Foundation and Fredericks Foundation, private companies and many local people. In 2011, it was visited by Prime Minister of the United Kingdom, David Cameron, as a flagship of the Big Society initiative.

== Media ==
The People's Supermarket
- Country of origin: United Kingdom
- Original language: English
- No. of series: 1
- No. of episodes: 4

Production
- Running time: 48 minutes

Original release
- Network: Channel 4
- Release: 6 February – 27 February 2011

The People's Supermarket was the subject of a four-episode February 2011 Channel 4 documentary series which followed chef and eco-restaurateur Arthur Potts Dawson's journey to launch a supermarket owned by its customers in order to compete with the UK's Big 4 Supermarkets. Founding members and local residents appear on the programmes. The series was produced by Wall to Wall Media.

The People's Supermarket was discussed on BBC Radio 4's You and Yours on 15 July 2010.

The story of its development and a detailed description of its operating and business model has been published by Nesta.

=== Episodes ===
| Episode | First aired | Summary |
|---|---|---|
| 1 | Sunday 6 February 2011 | Arthur tries to get his big idea started, but worries that a big name supermarket will grab the premises he's got his eye on. He manages to buy the building but does not have enough money to fully stock the shelves, and reactions from local residents are mixed. |
| 2 | Sunday 13 February 2011 | Arthur comes up with a guerrilla-style marketing campaign to persuade shoppers from nearby Sainsbury's to switch. |
| 3 | Sunday 20 February 2011 | Arthur is struggling to keep the supermarket afloat. He decides to open a kitchen. But will people eat food destined for the bin? |
| 4 | Sunday 27 February 2011 | The supermarket faces closure and Arthur's dream of a not-for-profit shop that is run for and by the people may well be over. It's time for him to take his biggest risk so far. Prime Minister, David Cameron visits the supermarket to discuss the concept and the progress being made with Arthur prior to his speech relaunching his flagship Big Society initiative. The show ends with Arthur hopeful of a grant from the Big Society Bank once it is running in June 2011. |

== See also ==
- List of food cooperatives
