= Snob screen =

Device found in some British public houses of the Victorian era

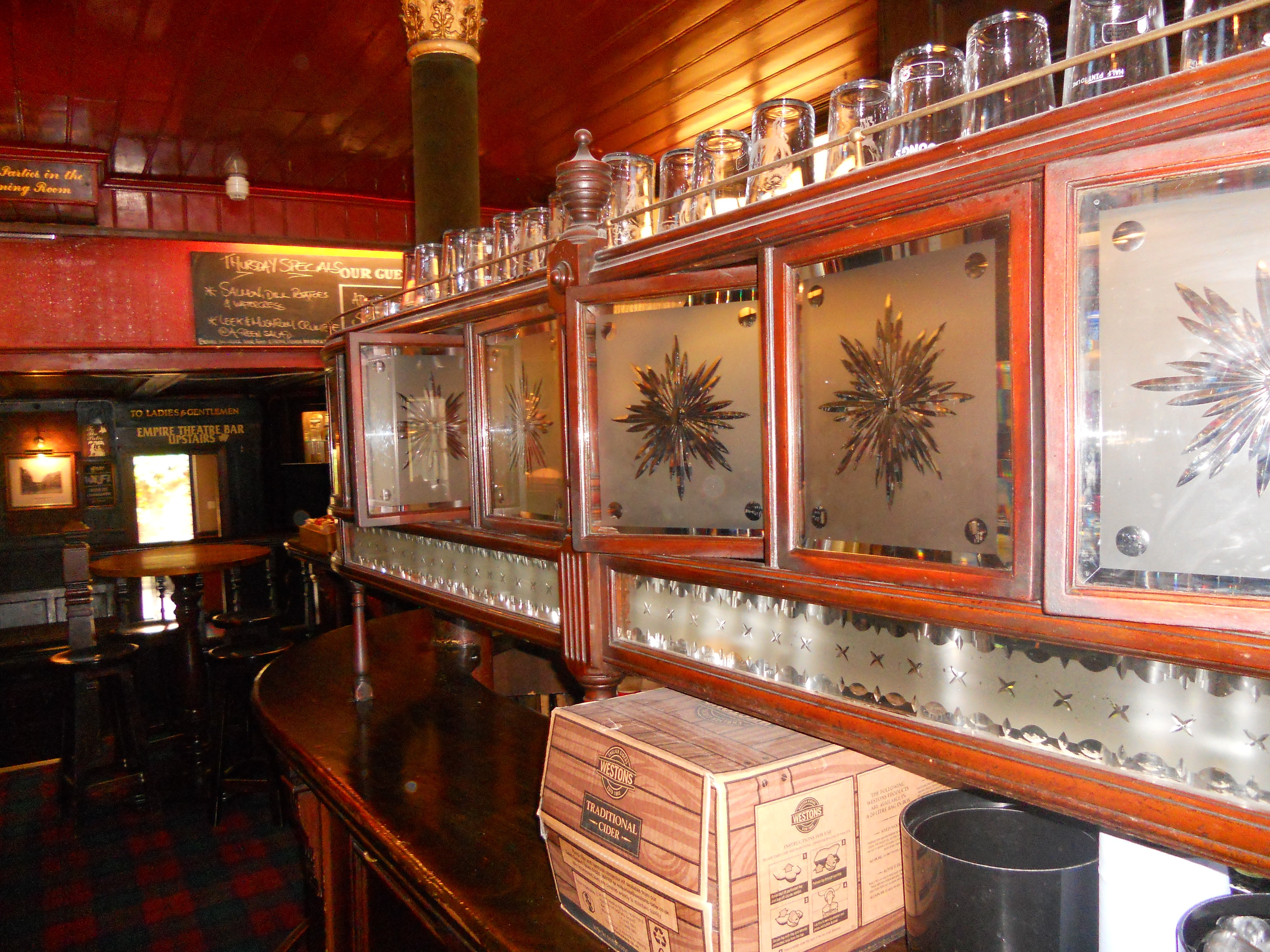
A row of snob screens at The Lamb in Bloomsbury

A snob screen is a device found in some British public houses of the Victorian era. Usually installed in sets, they comprise an etched glass pane in a movable wooden frame and were intended to allow middle class drinkers to see working class drinkers in an adjacent bar, but not to be seen by them, and to be undisturbed by the bar staff.

== Pubs with surviving snob screens ==
- The Bartons Arms, Birmingham
- Bunch of Grapes, London SW3
- The Champion, Wells Street, London W1
- Crown, London N1
- The Crown and Greyhound, Dulwich Village London (the screens have been re-sited)
- The Gate, London N22
- John Leslie's, Ratcliffe Terrace, Edinburgh
- The Lamb, Bloomsbury, London
- Nova Scotia, Bristol
- Posada, Wolverhampton
- Prince Alfred, Maida Vale, London
- Princess Louise, Holborn, London
- The Beacon Hotel, Dudley
