= Richard Carr (physician) =

English physician

Richard Carr FRCP
- Born: 1651; Louth, Lincolnshire
- Died: 1706 (aged 54–55)
- Burial place: St. Faith's Church under St. Paul's Cathedral; 51°30′46″N 0°5′46″W
- Education: University of Cambridge
- Medical career
- Profession: Physician, author
- Institutions: College of Physicians
- Notable works: Epistolæ Medicinales variis occasionibus scriptæ (1691)

Richard Carr, FRCP (1651 – 1706) was an English physician. He proceeded MA at Magdalene College, Cambridge in 1674; was master of Saffron Walden grammar school from 1676 to 1683; studied medicine at Leyden from 1683 to 1686; proceeded MD at Cambridge in 1686; and practised medicine in London. He published medical essays.

== Life ==
Richard Carr was son of Griffith Carr of Louth in Lincolnshire. He was born in 1651, and went from the grammar school of Louth to Magdalene College, Cambridge, where he entered as a sizar 31 May 1667, graduated BA 1670, and MA 1674. He became master of the grammar school of Saffron Walden in 1676, but in 1683 went to Leyden to study physic, and in 1686 proceeded MD at Cambridge. He was created a fellow of the College of Physicians by James II's charter, and was admitted in 1687. He died in September 1706, and was buried in St. Faith's Church, under St. Paul's Cathedral.

== Works ==
Carr is known as the author of Epistolæ medicinales variis occasionibus conscriptæ, which was published in 1691. The book is dedicated to the College of Physicians, and received the imprimatur of the president and censors. The epistles, eighteen in number, do not contain much medical information, but are written in a readable, popular style, as if addressed to patients rather than to physicians. The first is on the use of sneezing powders, the second on smoking tobacco, the third, fourth, seventh, fifteenth, and seventeenth on various points of dietetics, including a grave refutation of the doctrine that it is well to get drunk once a month. The eighth recommends a visit to Montpellier for a case of phthisis, the fifth and sixth discuss the remedial virtues of the Tonbridge and Bath waters and seven others are on trivial medical subjects. The fourteenth is on the struma, and in it Carr mentions that Charles II touched 92,107 persons between 1660 and 1682, and respectfully doubts whether they all got well. The most interesting of the epistles is the third, which is on the drinks used in coffee-houses, namely, "coffee, thee, twist (a mixture of coffee and tea), salvia, and chocolata". Carr shows some acquaintance with the medical writings of his time, and speaks with admiration of the Religio Medici. According to Norman Moore, "The impression left after reading his epistles is that he was a doctor of pleasant conversation, not a profound physician, but one whose daily visit cheered the valetudinarian, and whose elaborate discussion of symptoms satisfied the hypochondriac."
