= The Lamb, Bloomsbury =

Pub in Bloomsbury, London

Coordinates: 51.522991°N 0.119057°W

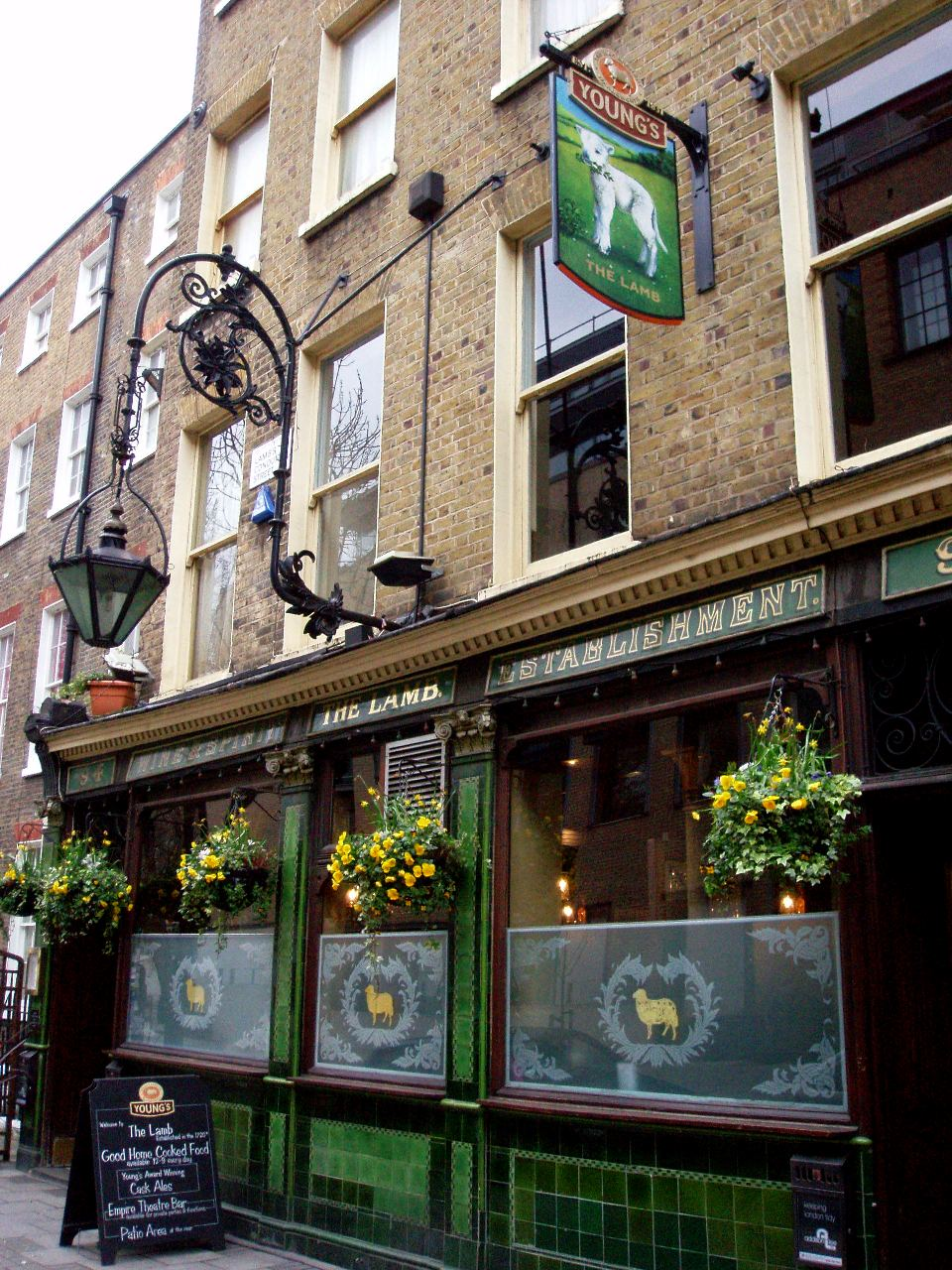
The Lamb

The Lamb is a Grade II listed pub at 94 Lamb's Conduit Street, in the London Borough of Camden, London.

The Lamb was built in the 1720s and the pub and the street were named after William Lamb, who repaired the Holborn Conduit, later renamed Lamb's Conduit in his honour, a few metres to the south, in 1577. The Lamb was refurbished in the Victorian era and is one of the few remaining pubs with 'snob screens' which allowed the well-to-do drinker not to see the bar staff, and vice versa.

Charles Dickens lived locally and is reputed to have frequented The Lamb. Other writers associated with the pub include Ted Hughes and Sylvia Plath. Hughes, who was a regular at the pub, arranged to meet Plath there in the early days of their relationship.

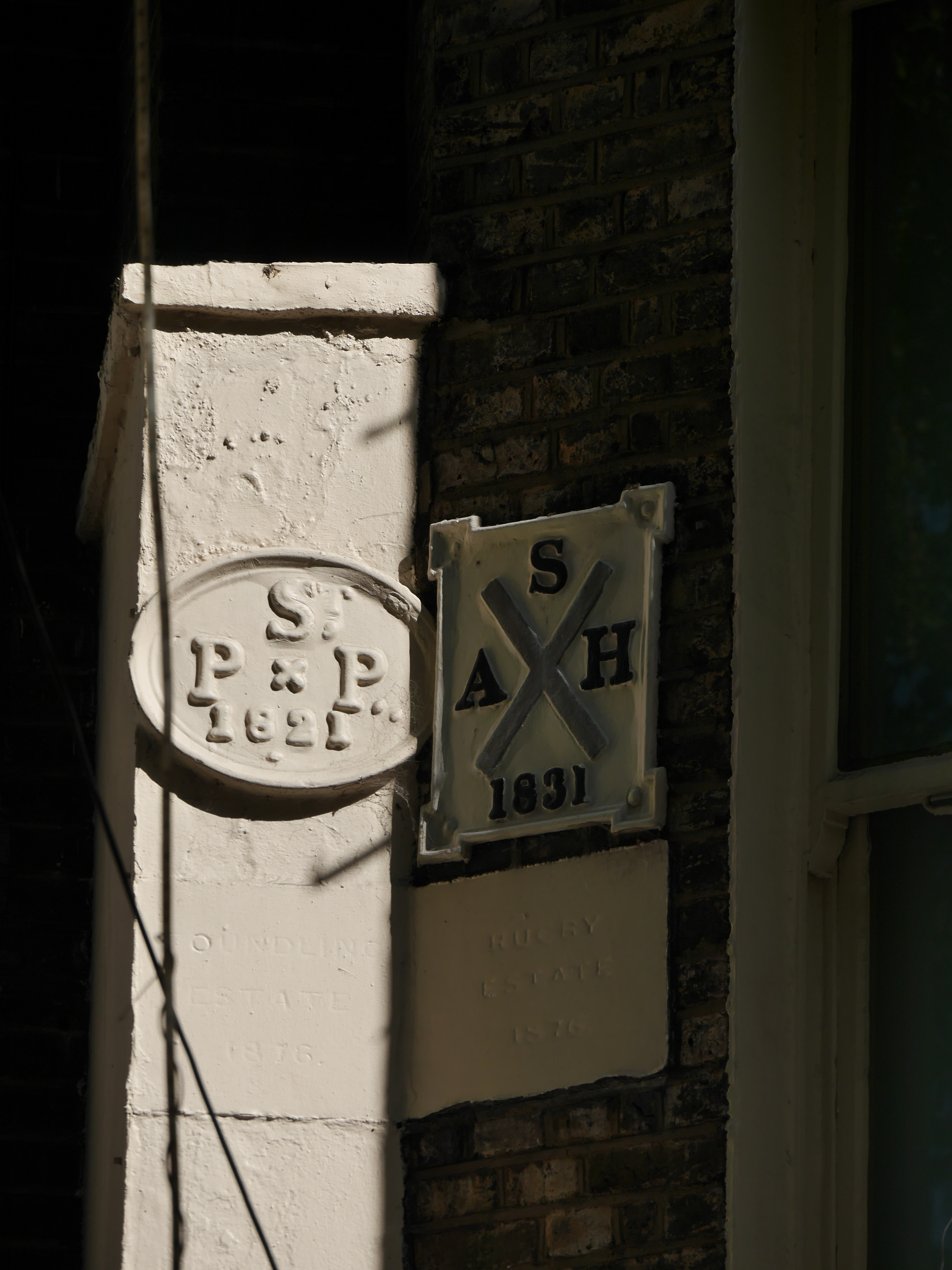
A sign on the north side of the pub marks the parish boundary of St Pancras and St Andrew Holborn. The pub is on the Holborn side.

== See also ==
- List of pubs in London
