= The Crown and Greyhound =

Pub in Dulwich, London

Coordinates: 51°26′58″N 0°05′05″W

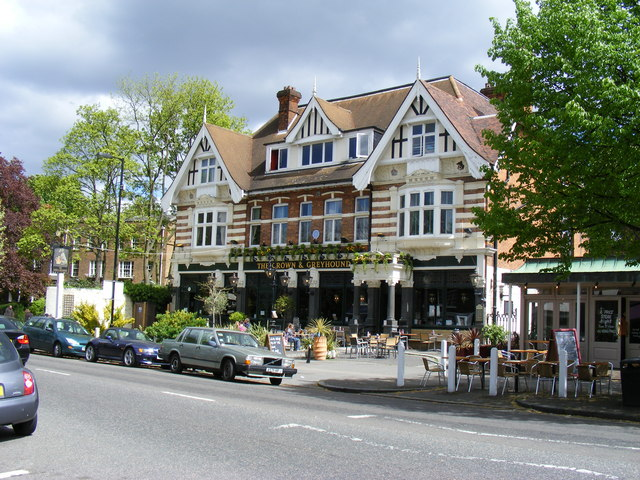
The Crown and Greyhound

The Crown and Greyhound is a Grade II listed public house at 73 Dulwich Village, Dulwich, London. It is classified by CAMRA as a pub with a regionally important historic interior. The pub is affectionately referred to by locals as "The Dog", and sometimes as "The Dog and Hat". The pub is particularly noteworthy for its post-war connection to the British poetry movement. It is described by Nikolaus Pevsner as, "a cheerfully cross gabled pub".

== History ==
The Crown and Greyhound gets its name from two former pubs in Dulwich Village, The Crown, and The Greyhound, which were across the street from each other up to the 1890s. The Crown is Britain's second most common pub name, and using a sign bearing a crown represented a convenient way to show support for the reigning monarch, without the need to change with the occupant of the throne. Pubs called The Greyhound are generally associated with hunting traditions, befitting of the Dulwich Village locality, which still retains elements of its rural origins to this day.

The two inns once attracted a different clientele, The Greyhound being home to the Dulwich Club and middle-class drinkers, whilst The Crown being more the 'local' of the numerous agricultural workers in the area. For many years, The Crown pub was run by the Goodman family, most of whom are buried in the Old Burial Ground, within a hundred yards of the present pub. By the end of the nineteenth century, with encroaching urbanisation in East Dulwich, the customer bases of the two inns had begun to converge, and shortly before 1900, both inns were demolished and replaced by the present Crown & Greyhound Hotel.

The present building was built in the Old English style in about 1897, on the site of The Crown. The Mosaic tilework at the left-hand entrance to this building (now hidden by carpet) still reads "The Crown". The original architects for The Crown and Greyhound were Eedle and Meyers, who specialised in pub design. The original plans included a billiards room at the back of the pub, a skittle alley as an outbuilding, a coffee room, and even a masonic temple room on the first floor. A contemporary account notes that one side of the drinking area at the front of the pub was still “carefully divided off for the better class of customer” and that some small bars catered for “the lower class of customer and for the jug and bottle trade”. The Cannon Brewery Company Ltd took over the running of the new pub when it first opened. The December 1897 issue of the Licensed Victuallers Gazette describes the pub as a "mahogany and plate-glass" monstrosity. The proprietor of the pub at this time was Robert J. Brinkley.

The pub retains its snob screens, although they have been re-sited over the partition between the main bar and former coffee room. The ground floor of the pub is subdivided into roughly 4 different rooms, which are described as exhibiting, "a spatial quality in the proportions, windows, and detailing that includes panelling, beams, etched glazing and curved bar which is continuous throughout". The Crown and Greyhound's friezes and ceiling decoration are particularly impressive. The pub also merits a Taylor Walker Heritage Inn blue plaque, by virtue of its historic interest.

On 13 August 1932, Alfred Edward Shervell (aged 49), the proprietor of the Crown and Greyhound in Dulwich Village, is reported to have died from his injuries in Nelson Hospital, Merton after falling in front of a train at South Wimbledon Tube Station.

Dorene and Sydney Kitching are recorded as being the licensees of the Crown and Greyhound for over twenty years from the 1950s. Sidney became a publican following duties as a fighter pilot in the RAF during World War II. It is noted that, in restoring catering to the pub, the Kitchings turned the entire pub into an open area, thus effectively eliminating the public bar on the left-hand side of the building, and unifying prices across the pub. Two elderly widows named Alice and Ivy, who were regulars of the public bar, are recorded as boycotting the pub for a short period afterwards, in protest at the increase of a penny on their pint of Guinness.

In the 1970s, the professional wrestler Mick McManus lived locally near Denmark Hill station. Nicknamed "The Dulwich Destroyer", he was regularly seen in the Crown and Greyhound at this time. The day after the General Election in 2001, Tessa Jowell describes receiving a phone call from the Prime Minister's office about an invitation to join Tony Blair's Cabinet, “There we were in the garden of the Crown and Greyhound in Dulwich Village and again it was a lovely sunny evening and my phone went. My agent picked it up out of my bag and said 'Oh, it’s Number 10 switchboard'."

The Crown and Greyhound's village roots, make this a regular venue for Morris dancers in the summer. The pub is also traditionally open on Christmas Day for locals in Dulwich Village to get together for a celebratory festive toast.

== Dulwich Hamlet Football Club ==
The former Crown Inn (on the site of the current Crown and Greyhound) is documented as regular haunt of the players of Dulwich Hamlet F.C. from the time of club's foundation in 1893, when players used to carry their goal posts through the pub's grounds, and stop by for a drink after matches. Supporter, Bill Kirby, aged 97, recounts the story of Dulwich Hamlet players returning to the Crown and Greyhound after their victory in the 1937 FA Amateur Cup Final, where the cup trophy, "was duly filled with booze, and an underage Bill was one of many to take a good swig from it". At this time, it is stated that the team used to frequent the Crown and Greyhound after every home game.

== Literary associations ==
The Greyhound pub in Dulwich Village, demolished (along with The Crown Inn) to make way for construction of The Crown and Greyhound, was where the Dulwich Club held its meetings. This association was established in 1772, for the purposes of friendly converse and social cheer among a large body of literary gentlemen, and entertained many distinguished guests, including Charles Dickens, William Makepeace Thackeray, Mark Lemon, and others.

Leigh Hunt 1784-1859 mentions the Greyhound as the starting point in his essay "A Walk from Dulwich to Brockham" arriving on a stage coach from the Strand, including a description of the view from a bedrom in the inn: "the situation of the inn was beautiful even towards the road, the place is so rich with trees; and returning to the room in which we had supped, we found with pleasure that we had a window there, presenting us with a peep into rich meadows, where the haymakers were at work in their white shirts."

The Crown and Greyhound was home to a branch of the British Poetry Society, founded by local poet Lionel Monteith in 1949. The foundation of this branch was almost certainly in response to ongoing turmoil at the Poetry Society, precipitated by 29-year-old Muriel Spark falling out with the society's old guard whilst combining her role as General Secretary with editing the Poetry Review. Another local Dulwich poet, and Spark's lover, Howard Sergeant, resigned his position on the Executive Council of the Poetry Society, and became an influential figure in setting up the Dulwich Poetry Group in 1949, and again, when it re-formed in 1959. Guest poets such as Stephen Spender, Laurie Lee, Dannie Abse, Marie Stopes, Kenneth Spring, and Michael Croft are recorded as attending meetings at the pub during this first incarnation of the Dulwich Poetry Group. It is recorded that the audience was invited to an hour and three-quarters of readings by poets, for a suggested donation of one shilling. The first recorded sighting of Michael Croft in the Crown and Greyhound was in autumn 1950, after an Alleyn's School Old Boy was stopped on the street by a burly figure in a duffel coat who inquired amicably, "Where can an old sailor get a drink around here?" Croft was then 29 years old, and had just started teaching at the school.

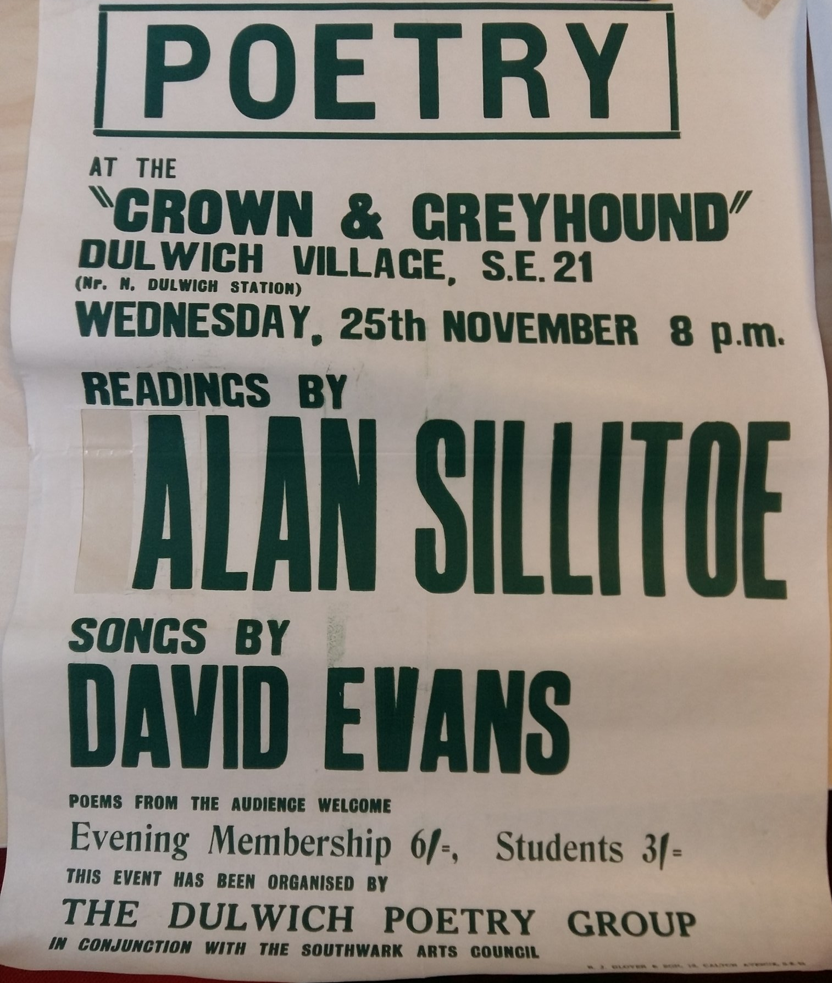
Alan Sillitoe at the Crown and Greyhound, Dulwich

The Crown and Greyhound is particularly associated with the "Bards in the Boozer", who met there monthly during the 1960s. B. S. Johnson and Zulfikar Ghose, were invited by Howard Sergeant to organise some of the meetings, and celebrated writers and poets reading at the Crown and Greyhound during this period included Alan Sillitoe, Ted Hughes, Edwin Brock, and Jenny Joseph. A photo exists of B. S. Johnson "looking bored senseless at a Dulwich Group poetry reading", upstairs at the Crown and Greyhound. Zulfikar Ghose describes the Dulwich Poetry Group as, "not formed as such, but evolving into one", and states that the contemporary photos of a reading at the Crown and Greyhound, taken for the cultural magazine Scene were, "all posed". He also recounts that Harold Pinter and Theodore Roethke were both persuaded to give readings.

In the aforementioned article in Scene magazine, B. S. Johnson writes that the inaugural meeting of the reformed Dulwich Poetry Group took place in September 1959. Nicholas Hagger recalls attending a meeting of the Dulwich Poetry Group at the Crown and Greyhound, and talking to B. S. Johnson, a conversation which carried on while they had a pee, during which Johnson said: "I am concerned to push the technical experiments in the novel to their utmost." B. S. Johnson himself, in his 16 April 1966 article for London Life magazine entitled, "A Hard Glance at the Poetry Business", describes the Dulwich Poetry Group readings upstairs at the Crown and Greyhound as the best in London, "and audiences of over a hundred (on one sweltering occasion, three hundred) are common." He ascribes this success to the "informal atmosphere", and fact that, "the audience can meet the poets down in the bar afterwards."

The poet George MacBeth, described as "the slim Edwardian dandy", is recorded as performing a reading at the pub in 1963. Edwin Morgan, widely recognised as one of the foremost Scottish poets of the 20th century, describes reading his poetry at The Crown and Greyhound in 1972. Alasdair Aston is recorded as being a leading light in the Dulwich Poetry Group which met at the Crown & Greyhound, being involved in the revival of poetry at the Crown and Greyhound in 1959, and serving as chairman of the Group from 1969-1975. In the 1986 book "At the Dog in Dulwich: Recollections of a poet" edited by Clive Murphy, Patricia Doubell, who also served as chair at the Dulwich Poetry Group, recalls readings at the Crown and Greyhound by Ivor Cutler, Seamus Heaney, and Stevie Smith. She also records the final reading of the Dulwich Poetry Group as taking place on 28 July 1983.

== Recent history ==
From 2013, up until its closure for refurbishment in September 2014, The Crown and Greyhound was home to "The Goose Is Out" folk club. The pub was also home to the Dulwich Chess Club on Monday nights prior to its closure in 2014, and a venue for the annual Dulwich Festival, which takes place each May. Local amateur dramatic group, The Dulwich Players, also used the pub as its regular meeting place.

The Crown and Greyhound was runner-up for best pub or bar in the "Dulwich (SE21) and East Dulwich (SE22)" category of Time Out magazine's "Love London Awards 2014".

In April 2013, Southwark Council approved plans put forward by The Dulwich Estate for the refurbishment and extension of the Crown and Greyhound to create a 20-bedroom boutique hotel. The pub reopened in June 2017.
