= Arthur Potts Dawson =

Arthur Potts Dawson (born 1971 in Camden, London) started cooking in 1988. He started with a three-year apprenticeship with the Roux brothers, worked with Rowley Leigh at Kensington Place for two years, with Rose Gray and Ruth Rogers at the River Café for four years, Hugh Fearnley-Whittingstall and Pierre Koffman both for a year. He worked as head chef at the River Café and went on to restyle Petersham Nurseries Cafe, re-launch Cecconi's restaurant, and to work as executive head chef for Jamie Oliver's Fifteen Restaurant.

Potts Dawson was the star of The People's Supermarket, televised on C4 in early 2011. The concept of the People's Supermarket, on Lamb's Conduit Street in London's Bloomsbury, was that it would be staffed entirely by local residents, to keep costs low and prices affordable. The show also starred Grandma Josie, campaigning for the working class, and goldsmith Jocelyn Burton.

Dawson was the technical consultant to the UK franchise of fast-food chain BurgerFi. He is the stepson of Chris Jagger.
