= Wells Street (City of Westminster) =

Street in Westminster

Coordinates: 51°31′2.28″N 0°8′16.39″W

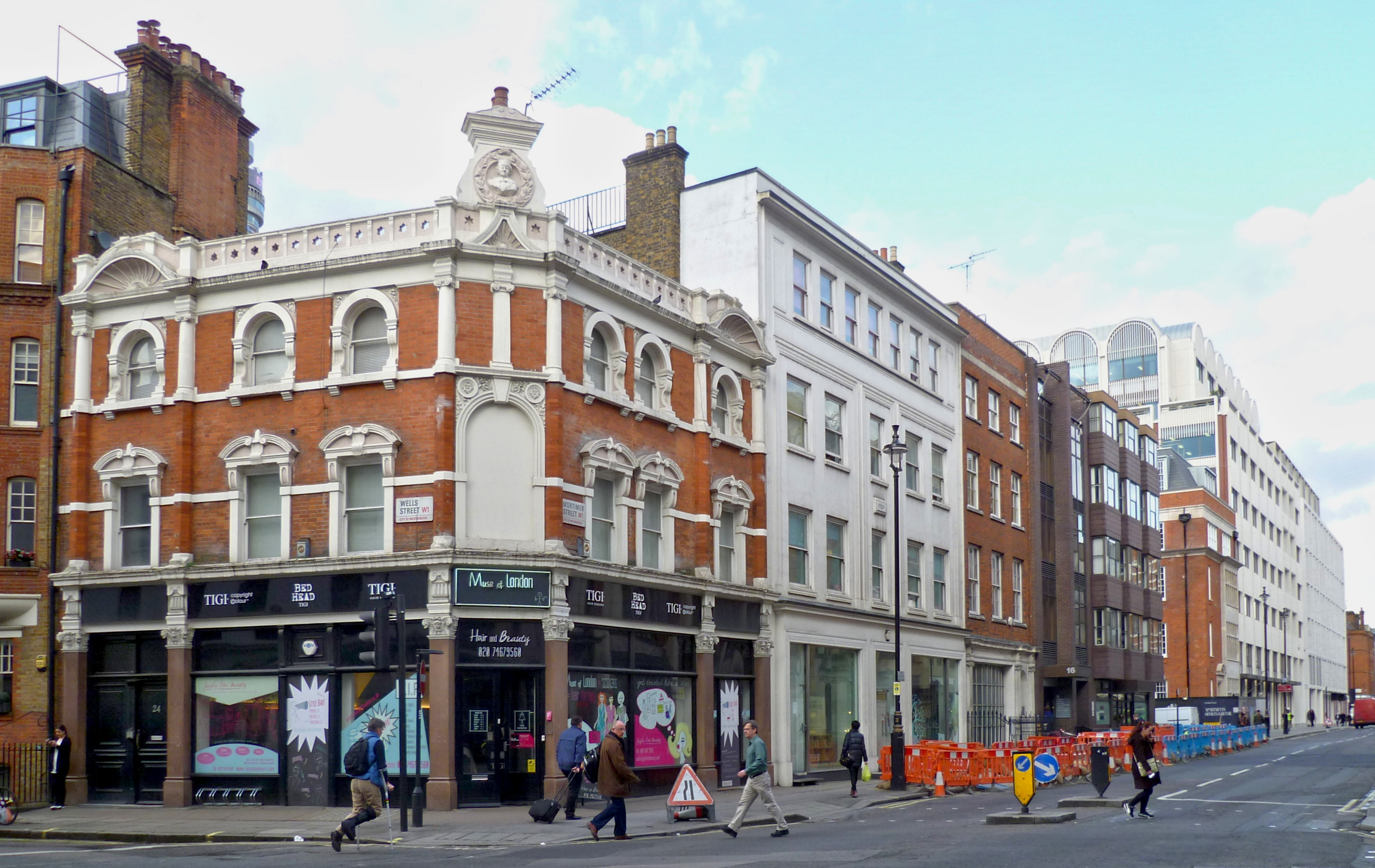
Corner of Wells Street & Mortimer Street

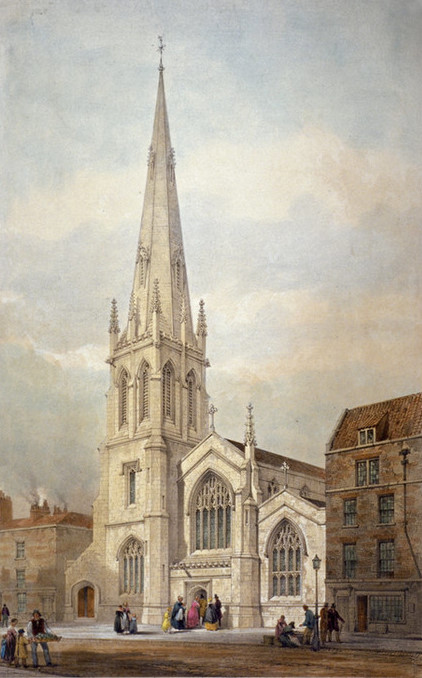
St Andrew's Church, c. 1846.

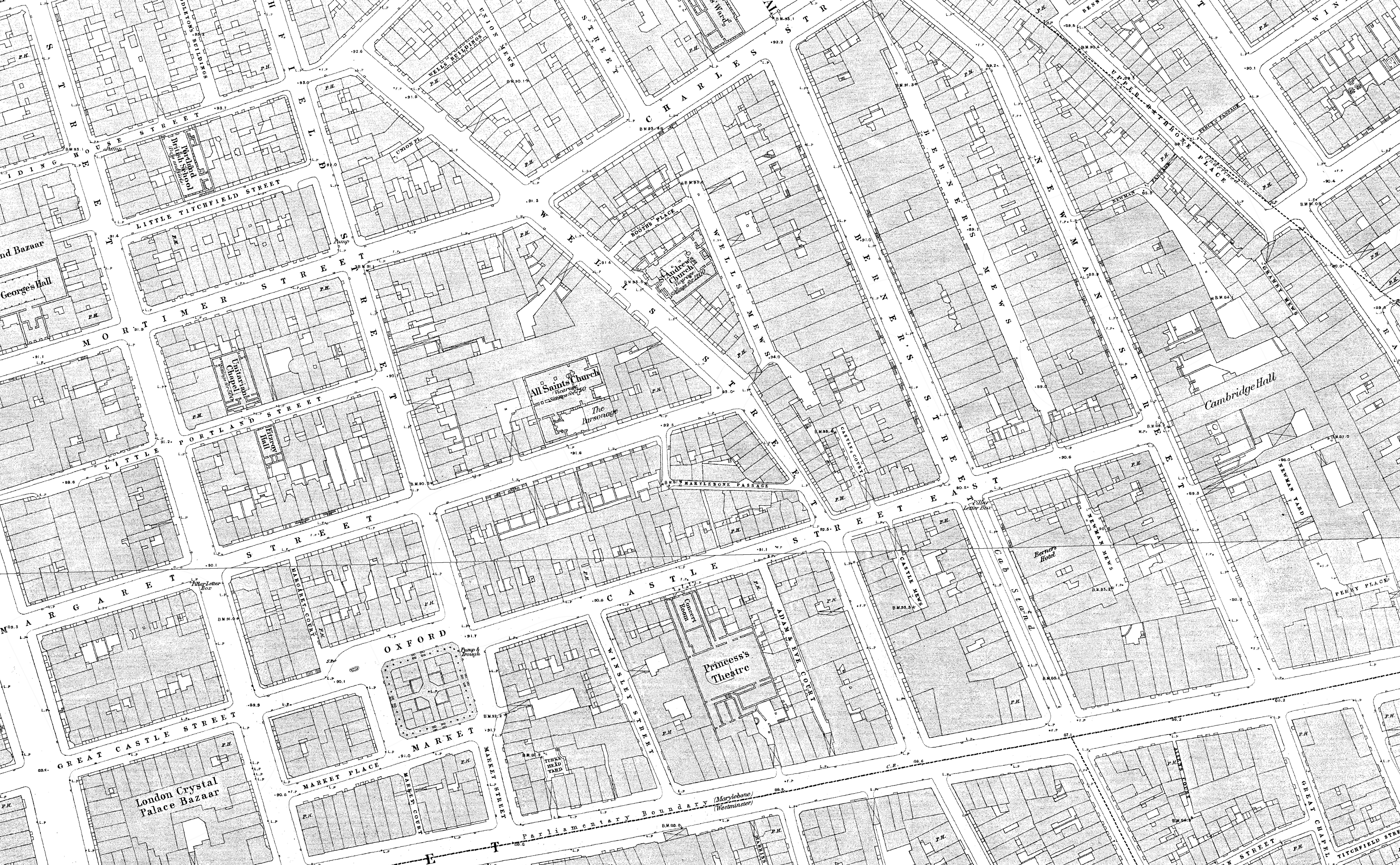
Wells Street (centre diagonal) on an 1870s Ordnance Survey map.

Wells Street is a street in the City of Westminster. It runs from Riding House Street in the north to Oxford Street in the south. It is crossed by Mortimer Street and Eastcastle Street. It is joined on its western side by Marylebone Passage and on the eastern side by Booth's Place and Wells Mews.

== St Andrew's church ==
Wells Street was once the location of St Andrew's, a Church of England parish church, completed to designs by Samuel Daukes in 1847, which was deconstructed and rebuilt in its entirety in Kingsbury, Middlesex, in 1933–34. The site was then vacant and used as a car park before offices were built on it which are now occupied by the University of Westminster. Flats known as St Andrew's Chambers were built adjacent to the site around 1900.

St Andrew's was said to have the best parish church choir in London. In February 1864, the choir, directed by Joseph Barnby, performed two anthems by Alice Mary Smith; this is believed to be the first time that liturgical music composed by a woman was performed in the Church of England.

The actress Sarah Bernhardt married Aristide Damala at St Andrew's in 1882. In 1890 Count Alexander Munster's marriage to Lady Muriel Hay at St Andrew's was depicted on the front page of The Illustrated London News.

== Businesses ==
The Susan Small fashion business was based at number 76. The singer Sandie Shaw also owned a fashion business there, in 1968. It is also home to the Cartoon Museum, home to Britains cartoon and comic art heritage.

== Notable buildings ==
It contains listed buildings:

- The Champion public house.
- St Margaret's House.
