= F. W. Porter =

Frederick William Porter (19 October 1821 – 17 November 1901) was an Anglo-Irish architect.

== Biography ==
Frederick William Porter was born in Rathmines, Dublin, on 19 October 1821, the second son of William Edward Porter (1783-1859) and his wife Anne (née Coultate).

Porter was a pupil of Lewis Vulliamy.

In 1865, he designed the Union Bank of London branch at 95 Chancery Lane and 61 Carey Street, which was featured in the architectural journal, The Builder. He also designed the bank's branch at 66 Trafalgar Square, completed in 1871.

In 1875, St James' Church, Islington, designed by Porter, was opened.

His son Horace Porter (1861–1918) was also an architect. His daughter Bertha Porter was a biographer and bibliographer.
