= Lamb's Conduit Street =

Street in Holborn, London

Coordinates: 51.5220°N 0.1186°W

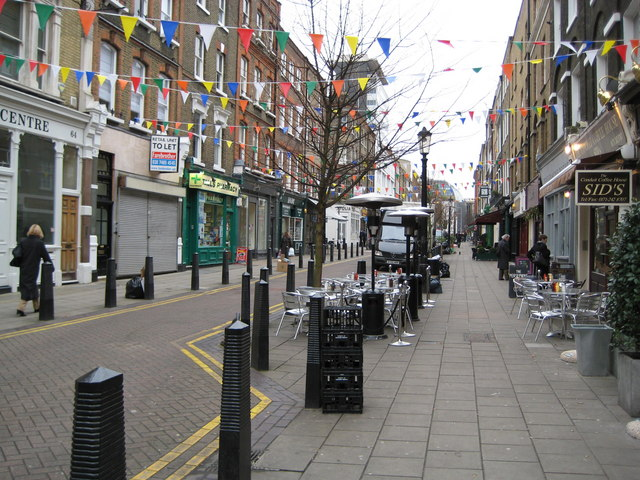
Lamb's Conduit Street

Lamb's Conduit Street is a street in Holborn in the West End of London. The street takes its name from Lamb's Conduit, originally known as the Holborn Conduit, a dam across a tributary of the River Fleet.

== Lamb's Conduit ==
Lamb's Conduit was named after William Lambe, who in 1564 made a charitable contribution of £1,500, an enormous sum in those days, for the rebuilding of the Holborn Conduit. The Conduit (a cistern) was fed by a dam across a tributary of the River Fleet. The Conduit also supplied water to the nearby Snow Hill area by a system of pipes. Lambe also provided 120 pails to enable poor women to make a living selling the water. The tributary ran west to east along the north side of Long Yard, followed the curved course of Roger Street and joined the Fleet near Mount Pleasant. This formed the boundary with the Ancient Parishes of Holborn (to the south) and St Pancras (to the north).

The importance of the conduit diminished when the New River opened in 1613 and the conduit was demolished in 1746. The remains of the head of the conduit can be seen on the side of a 1950s building on the corner between Lamb's Conduit Street and Long Yard. On the stone, an inscription reads: "Lamb's Conduit, the property of the City of London. This pump was erected for the benefit of the Publick".

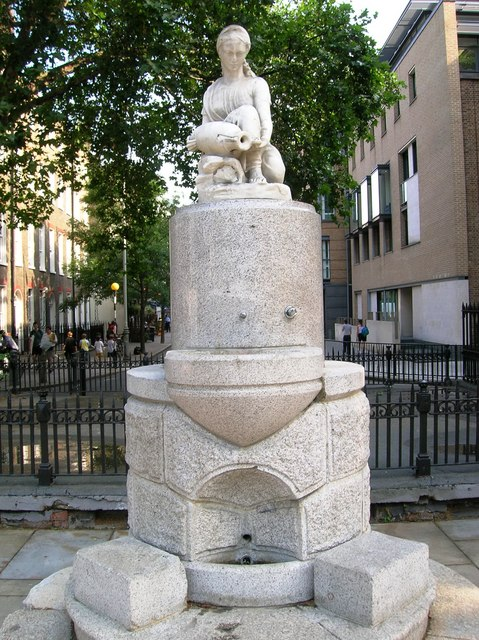
Fountain commemorating Lamb's Conduit, situated at the junction of Lamb's Conduit Street and Guilford Street

There is a fountain at the north end of Lamb's Conduit Street, at the junction with Guilford Street, on the boundary between the former Metropolitan Boroughs of Holborn and St Pancras that was built in 1870. The Heritage of London Trust spent £17,000 renovating it in 2024.

== Townscape ==
Notable buildings include The Lamb public house which is grade II listed, and the former People's Supermarket food cooperative. There are many independent traders along the street.

== Notable residents ==
Notable residents have included John Lind (1737–1781), the barrister, political activist and pamphleteer; John Haslam (1764–1844), the apothecary, physician and medical writer, known for his work on mental illness; and Henry Revell Reynolds (1745–1811) the physician. John Mason Neale (1818–1866), the Church of England clergyman, author, ecclesiologist, hymnologist, and poet, was born at 40 Lamb's Conduit Street.

John Turner lived together with his wife Mary at 7 Lamb's Conduit Street, where they hosted the American anarchist Voltairine de Cleyre in the summer of 1897.

Virginia Woolf used the architecture of Lamb's Conduit Street to arouse her "historic sense" in the 1922 novel Jacob's Room: "The bitter eighteenth century rain rushed down the Kennel."
