= St Faith under St Paul's =

Coordinates: 51°30′46″N 0°5′46″W

- St Faith under St Paul's
- Location: Castle Baynard, London
- Country: England
- Denomination: Anglican

Architecture
- Years built: Pre 11th century
- Demolished: 1255

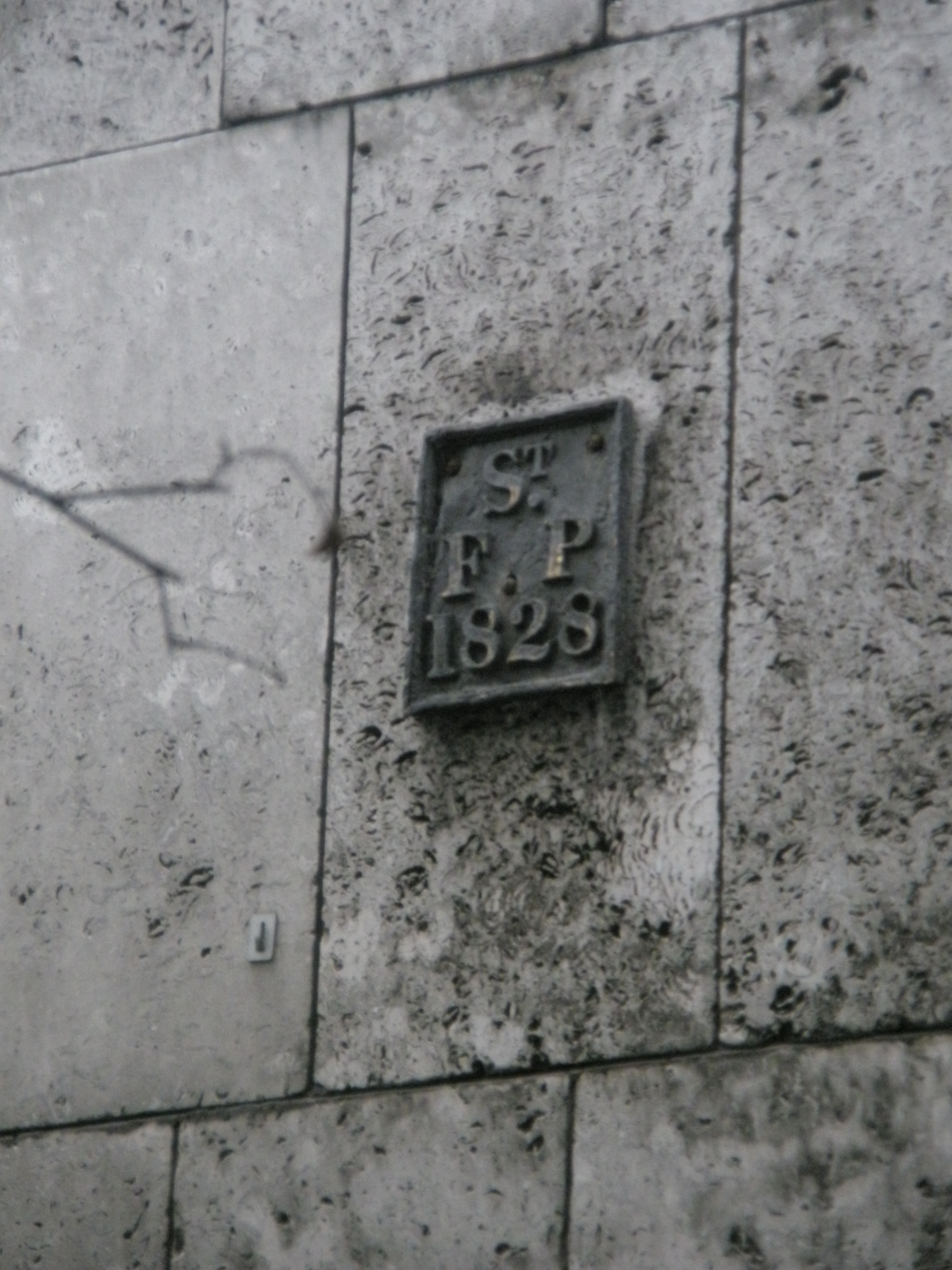
Parish boundary mark

St Faith under St Paul's in Castle Baynard Ward was an unusual parish within the City of London. It originally had its own building to the east of St Paul's Cathedral, serving as a parish church for the residents of St Paul's Churchyard and Paternoster Row, but this was removed in 1256 to allow for the eastern expansion of the Cathedral. The parishioners were instead given a space to worship within the cathedral crypt.

The parish appears as "St Faith within the monastery of St Paul's, London" in 1381, with mention of John Phelip, as a former parson.

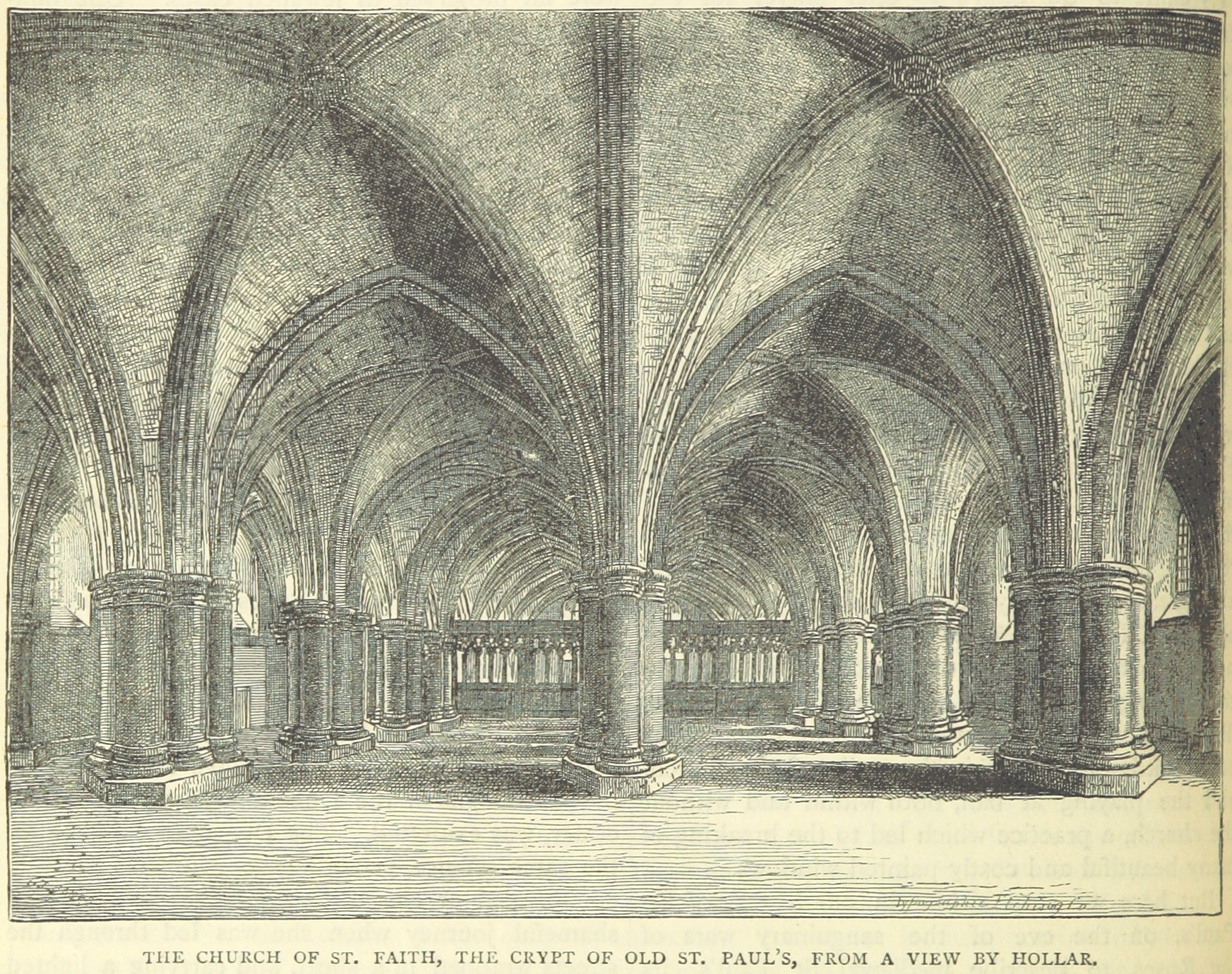
The Church of St. Faith, the crypt of old St. Paul's, from a view by Hollar

Until the reign of Edward VI the parishioners worshipped at the end of the west crypt under St Paul’s Quire. Sir Simonds D'Ewes, the diarist, attended the wedding of his father Paul and his stepmother, Lady Elizabeth Denton, in "St. Faith's under St. Paul's" on 5 March 1623, and Sir Simonds's younger sister Mary also married there on 4 December 1626 From the reign of Edward VI until the Great Fire the parishioners, mostly booksellers in Paternoster Row, transferred to the Jesus Chapel, their separateness emphasised by a screen.

After the destruction of the cathedral by the Great Fire in 1666, the parish was united with that of St Augustine Watling Street.

== Burials ==
- Christopher Barker (officer of arms)
- Margaret Talbot, Countess of Shrewsbury
- Dr. Richard Carr, M.D.
- Sir Thomas Knight Argall, Clerk to Thomas Cromwell
