= The Champion, Wells Street =

Pub in Fitzrovia, London

The Champion, public house
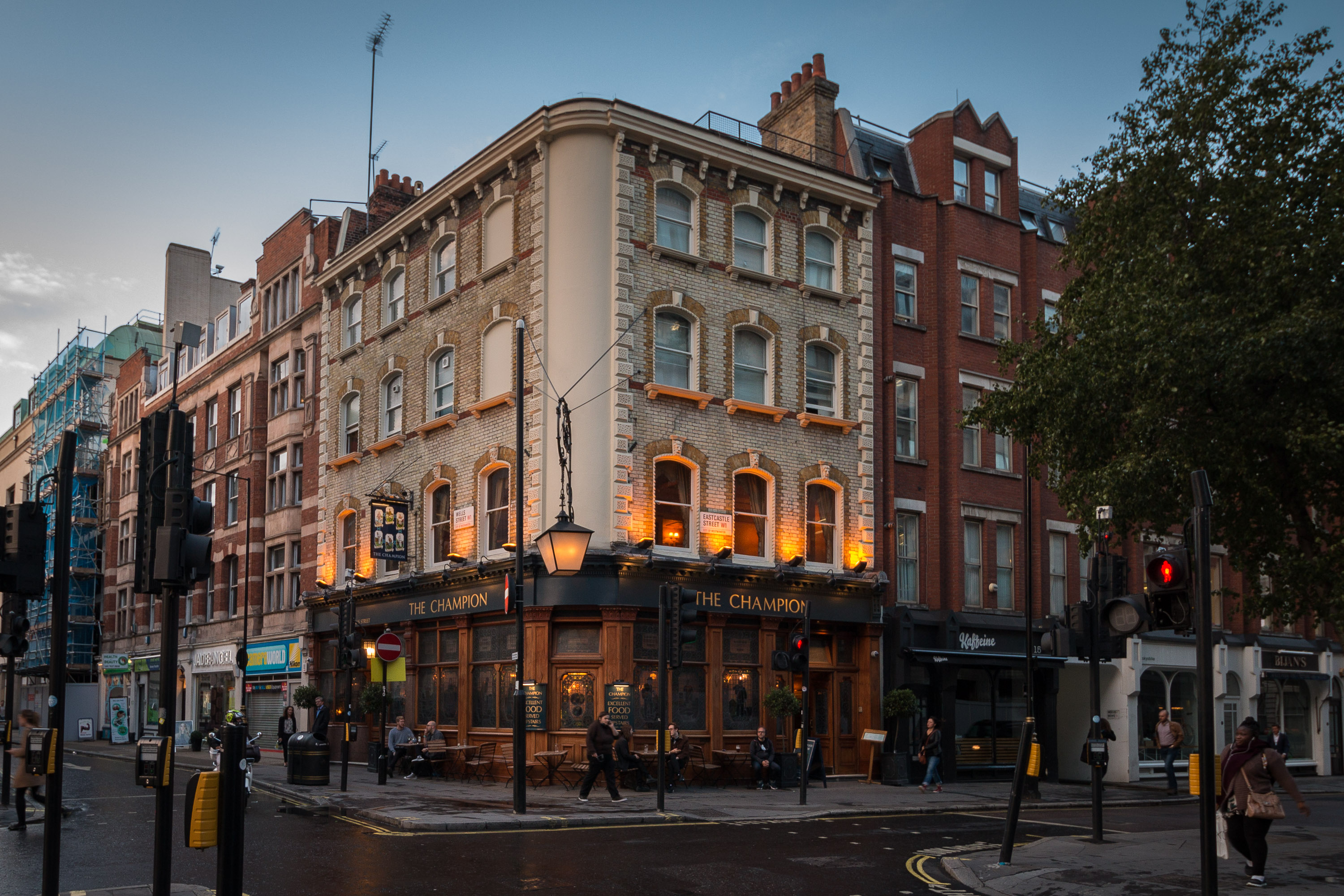
- Interactive map of the The Champion, public house area

General information
- Location: City of Westminster, England
- Coordinates: 51°30′59″N 0°8′14″W

Design and construction
- Awards and prizes: Listed as Grade II by Historic England

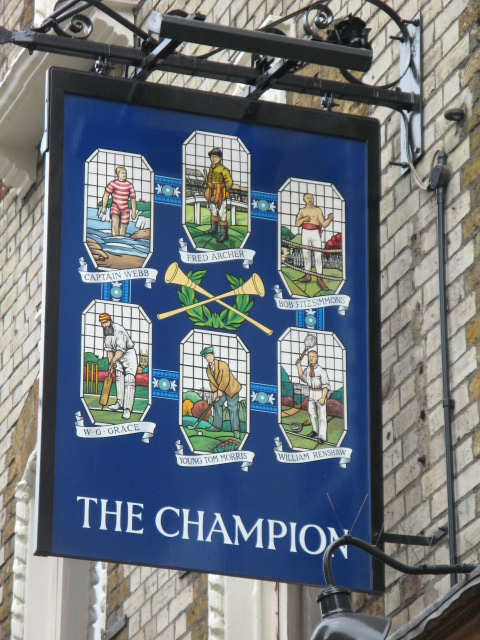
The pub sign in 2009.

The Champion is a 19th-century public house in Wells Street in the Fitzrovia area of the City of Westminster, London. It is notable for the presence of stained glass windows and a snob screen, a Victorian feature preserved to the present day in only a few pubs.

The building in Grade II listed. It was built around 1860 to 1870 of gault brick with stucco dressings and a slate roof. Historic England comment on its "lively classical detailing". It was refitted by architects John Robson Reid and Sylvia Reid in the 1950s following a competition in Architectural Review.

The stained glass windows in the pub are a more recent feature, and were designed by Ann Sotheran, commissioned by Samuel Smith Old Brewery when they purchased the pub in the 1980s. CAMRA's WhatPub guide lists the pub as an outstanding example of restoration.
