= Worshipful Company of Clothworkers =

Livery company of the City of London

Coordinates: 51.51144°N 0.08109°W

The coat of arms of the company.

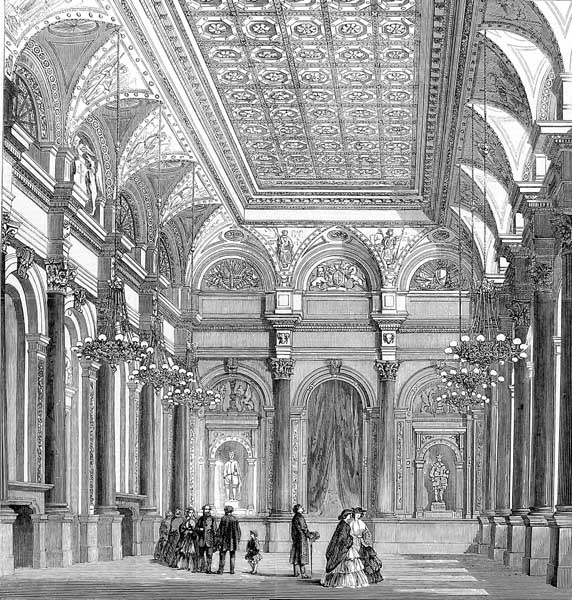
The Livery Hall of the Clothworkers' Company in 1859.

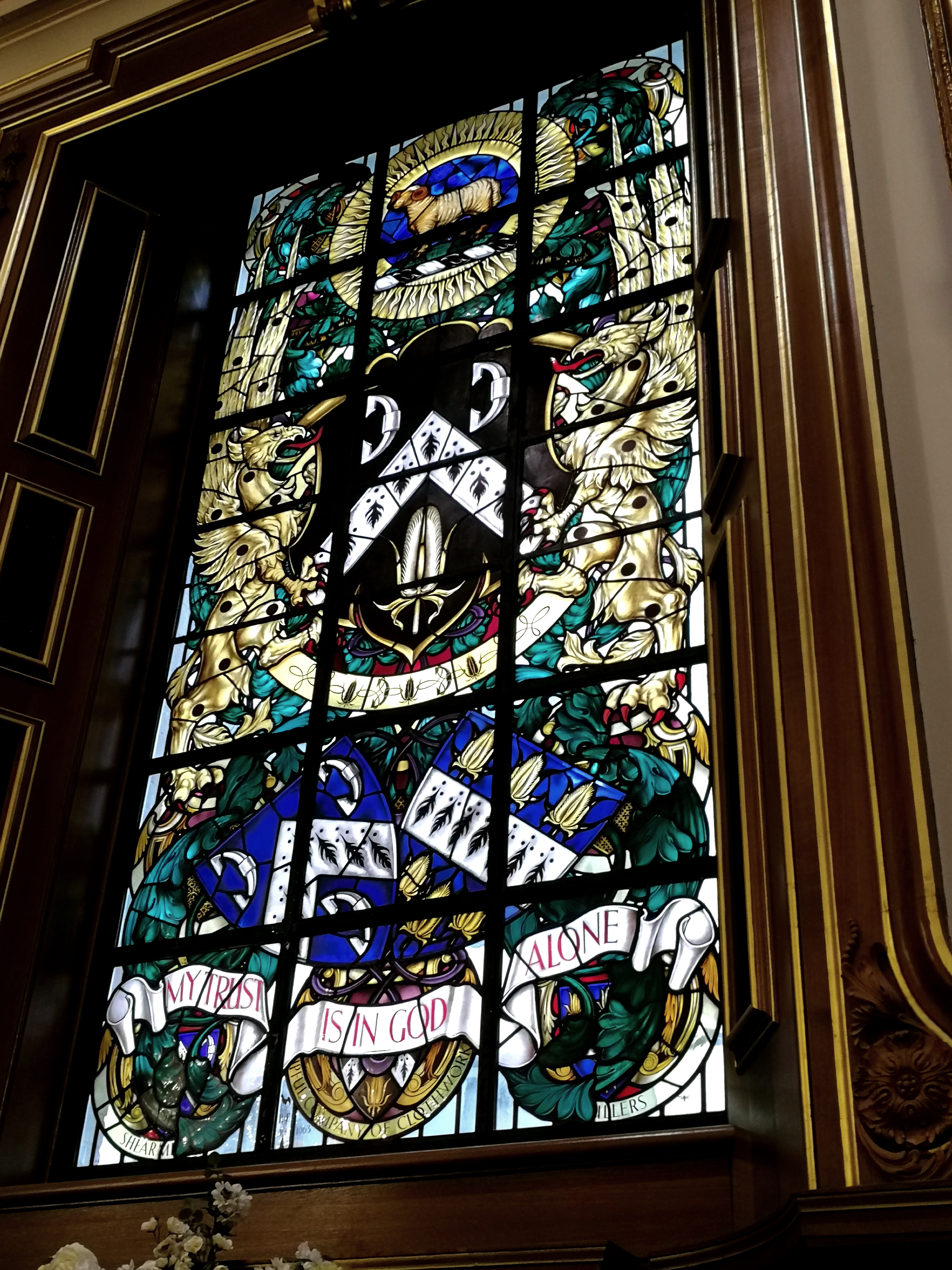
Armorial window with the arms of the Worshipful Company of Clothworkers, along with those of its predecessor companies—the Shearmen and the Fullers.

The Worshipful Company of Clothworkers is one of the Livery Companies of the City of London. It was incorporated by Royal Charter in 1528, following the merger of two older guilds: the Fullers (incorporated in 1480) and the Shearmen (incorporated in 1508). As the successor to the Shearmen's Company, it ranks twelfth in the order of precedence among City livery companies.

The Clothworkers’ original craft was the finishing of woven woollen cloth. This process included fulling—to mat the fibres and remove grease—drying on tenter frames, raising the nap with fuller's teasel, and shearing the surface to a smooth, even finish. The company's ordinances, first issued in 1532 and signed by Sir Thomas More, were intended to regulate the trade, uphold standards, and protect approved practices.

From the late Middle Ages, cloth production gradually shifted away from London, a trend accelerated by the Great Fire of London and the Industrial Revolution in the 18th and 19th centuries. Despite this decline in the trade, the company's charitable functions persisted, supported by generous donations of money and property from members and benefactors.

Today, the company's primary role is philanthropic, conducted through the Clothworkers’ Foundation, an independent charity. The Foundation awards grants aimed at improving quality of life, particularly for disadvantaged people and communities. The company also generates revenue by renting out Clothworkers’ Hall for private events.

Both the company and the foundation are based at Clothworkers’ Hall, located in Dunster Court, between Mincing Lane and Mark Lane in the City of London. The site was acquired by a group of Shearmen in 1456. The current building, completed in 1958, is the sixth on the site. Its immediate predecessor, designed by Samuel Angell and opened in 1860, was destroyed during the Blitz in 1941.

Notable members of the Worshipful Company of Clothworkers have included King James I, Samuel Pepys, Prince Albert of Saxe-Coburg and Gotha, Baroness Burdett-Coutts, George Peabody, Sir Sydney Waterlow, Edward VII, Lord Kelvin, Viscount Slim, Robert Menzies, and the Duke of Kent.
