= W. M. Brutton =

British architect

- Born: 1 December 1860; London, England
- Died: 1937 (aged 77); Lambeth, London, England
- Occupation: Architect

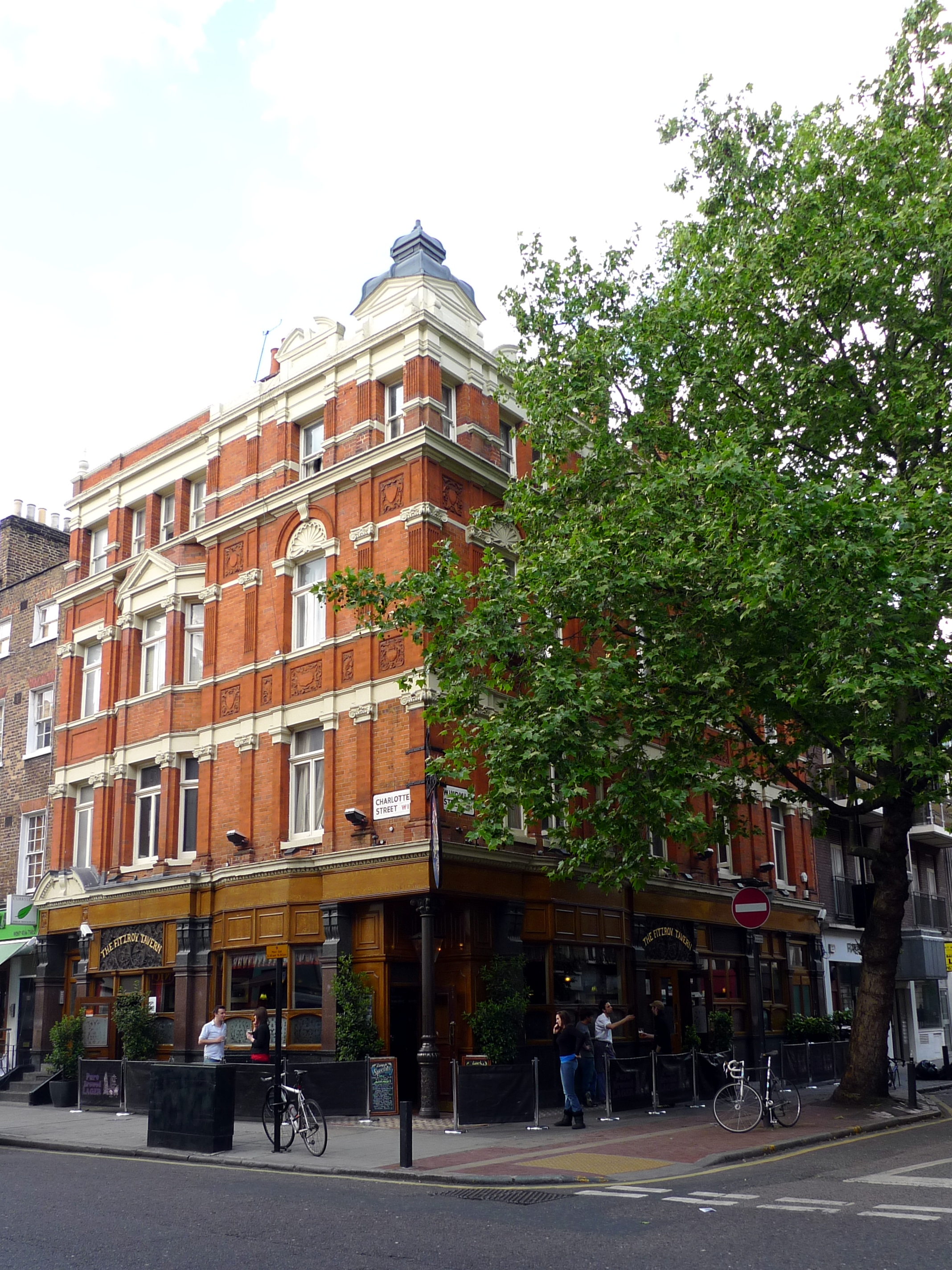
The Fitzroy Tavern

William Mortimer Brutton (1 December 1860 – 1937) was a British architect.

== Early life ==
He was born in Kensington, London, the second son (and second of three children) of William Courtenay Brutton (1831–1878), who was a solicitor, originally from Exeter his wife Hannah Bridge (1836–1879).

== Career ==
Brutton has been described as a "prolific pub architect".

His works include the Fitzroy Tavern, a public house situated at 16 Charlotte Street in the Fitzrovia district of central London, to which it gives its name. The building was originally constructed as the Fitzroy Coffee House, in 1883, and converted to a pub (called “The Hundred Marks”) in 1887, by Brutton.

In 1896, Brutton designed the King's Head, Tooting, which CAMRA describe as "an historic pub interior of national importance".

Also in 1896, Brutton designed the St James's Tavern in Denham Street, in central London.

In 1897, Brutton was responsible for the remodelling and extension of the Alhambra Theatre in Leicester Square, now the site of the Odeon Leicester Square.

Brutton also designed the Princess Victoria in Shepherd's Bush.

== Personal life ==
In October 1880, he married Ada Louise Pidding (1864–1947), when she was 16 year old. They had a daughter, Ethel Mortimer Brutton Shield (1881–1911). His wife filed for divorce in 1907, stating that in 1901 he began drinking uncontrollably, and became violent and cruel toward her. He was ordered to pay £100 annually to her. The divorce petition was withdrawn but they lived separately. He died in 1937.
