= Anthony Carson (writer) =

Anthony Carson (1907-1973) was a British journalist and humorous travel writer.

== Biography ==
Anthony Carson was the literary pseudonym of Peter Brooke, born Peter von Bohr.

In the 1940s, he drank at The Wheatsheaf pub in Fitzrovia, London with Dylan Thomas, Julian Maclaren-Ross, George Barker, Peter Vansittart, Mulk Raj Anand, Fred Urquhart, Paul Potts and Tambimuttu.

His portrait by Daniel Farson was included in the National Portrait Gallery exhibition, Famous in the Fifties: Photographs by Daniel Farson, in 2012. He is mentioned in the memoirs of Julian Maclaren Ross and Rupert Croft-Cooke, and is one of the subjects of Paul Johnson's book of biographies, Brief Lives (2011).

Colin MacInnes described him in The Observer as "one of the few great English humorous writers of the century".

== Songs ==
- Violin: Sweet and Low Played the Bow, written by Allan Gray & Peter Brooke, Sydney: J. Albert & Son, 1941

== Novels & travel writing ==
- Our Lady of the Earthquakes, London: Cresset Press, 1940 (published as Peter Brooke)
- Any More for the Gondola, Essex: Hurst & Blackett Ltd, 1950
- A Train to Tarragona, London: Methuen & Co, 1957
- On to Timbuctoo, London: Methuen & Co, 1958
- Looking for a Bandit, London: Methuen & Co, 1961
- Poor Man's Mimosa, or, Journeys in Modern Europe, London: Methuen & Co, 1962
- Carson was here, London: Methuen & Co, 1962
- A Rose By Any Other Name, London: Methuen & Co, 1962
- Travels Near and Far Out, Pantheon, 1963 (with a preface by Evelyn Waugh)
- The Hiccuping Cuckoo, London: Methuen & Co, 1965
- The Sin of Summer, London: Methuen & Co, 1965 (includes also The Adventures of Mr Quick)
- The Golden Kiss, London: Methuen & Co, 1966 (sequel to The Adventures of Mr Quick)
