= John Alexander Gresse =

English painter

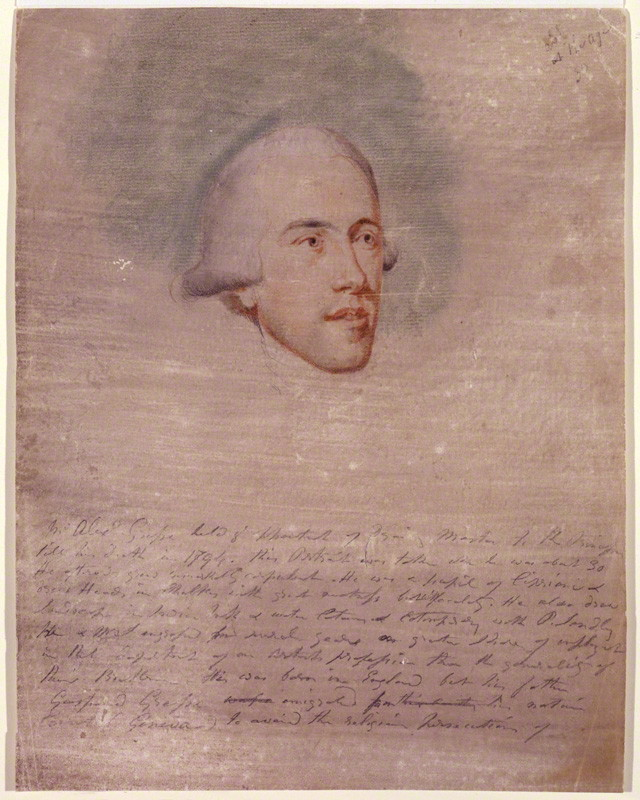
John Alexander Gresse by an unknown hand. c. 1770. National Portrait Gallery, London.

John Alexander Gresse (born 1741–1794), was an English painter and drawing-master.

== Early life ==
Gresse was born in London in 1741. His father was a native of Rolle, on the Lake of Geneva, and owned a small property close to Oxford Street, on which the present streets, Stephen Street and Gresse Street, Rathbone Place, were built about 1771. Gresse studied drawing under Gerard Scotin, the engraver, and was one of the first students to work in the gallery of casts founded by the Duke of Richmond. In 1755, he obtained a premium at the Society of Arts for a drawing by a student under the age of fourteen years; further, in 1759, he gained three premiums for drawings and studies from the human figure. He was successful again in 1761 and 1762, obtaining in all nine premiums before attaining the age of twenty-one.

== Career ==
He was for a short time pupil of Major the engraver, and worked for several years under Cipriani, profiting at the same time by the instruction of Zuccarelli. He was employed by John Boydell to make drawings. Gresse lacked the industry and application necessary to succeed in the higher branches of his art, and as he inherited a sufficient income from his father, he did not exert his full powers. In 1763, he exhibited a landscape at the Free Society of Artists, and in 1764 two miniatures and a Madonna. In 1765 he became a member of the rival Incorporated Society of Artists, and exhibited with them for four years, chiefly miniatures. In 1768, he sent a stained drawing of the Earl of Bessborough's seat at Roehampton. Gresse excelled in this branch of water-colour painting, and some of his views were engraved. He became one of the most fashionable drawing-masters of his day. In 1777, he was appointed drawing-master to the royal princesses, and was soon a favourite at court. His corpulence obtained for him the nickname of ‘Jack Grease.’ He occasionally practised etching, and etched the plates for Kennedy's ‘Account of the Statues and Pictures at Wilton House’ (1769). He published a few other etchings, including one of ‘St. Jerome’ after Guido, and ‘A Satyr Sleeping’ after N. Poussin.

== Death and legacy ==
Gresse died on 19 February 1794, in his fifty-third year, and was buried at St. Anne's, Soho. He was a great collector of works of art, which were sold by auction shortly after his death, the sale occupying six days.

== References and sources ==
This article incorporates text from a publication now in the public domain: "Gresse, John Alexander". Dictionary of National Biography. London: Smith, Elder & Co. 1885–1900.
