= Fitzrovia =

District of central London, England

Coordinates: 51.523°N 0.139°W

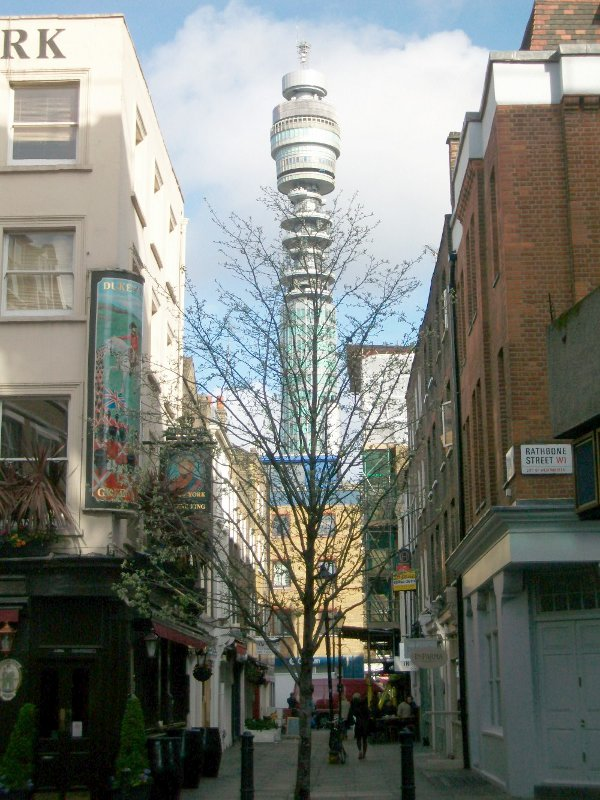
- Charlotte Place, near the border of Camden and Westminster, with the area's main landmark, the BT Tower, visible in the background

- Location within Greater London
- Demonym: Fitzrovian
- OS grid reference: TQ292821
- London borough: Camden; Westminster
- Ceremonial county: Greater London
- Region: London
- Country: England
- Sovereign state: United Kingdom
- Post town: LONDON
- Postcode district: W1; WC1
- Dialling code: 020
- Police: Metropolitan
- Fire: London
- Ambulance: London
- UK Parliament: Holborn and St Pancras; Cities of London and Westminster
- London Assembly: Barnet and Camden; West Central

Fitzrovia (/fɪtsˈroʊviə/ fits-ROH-vee-ə) is a district of central London, England, near the West End. Its eastern part is in the London Borough of Camden, and the western in the City of Westminster. It has its roots in the Manor of Tottenham Court, and was urbanised in the 18th century. Its name was coined in the late 1930s by Tom Driberg.

It is characterised by its mixed-use of residential, business, retail, education and healthcare, with no single activity dominating. The once bohemian area was home to writers such as Virginia Woolf, George Bernard Shaw and Arthur Rimbaud. In 2016, The Sunday Times named it the best place to live in London.

== Geography ==
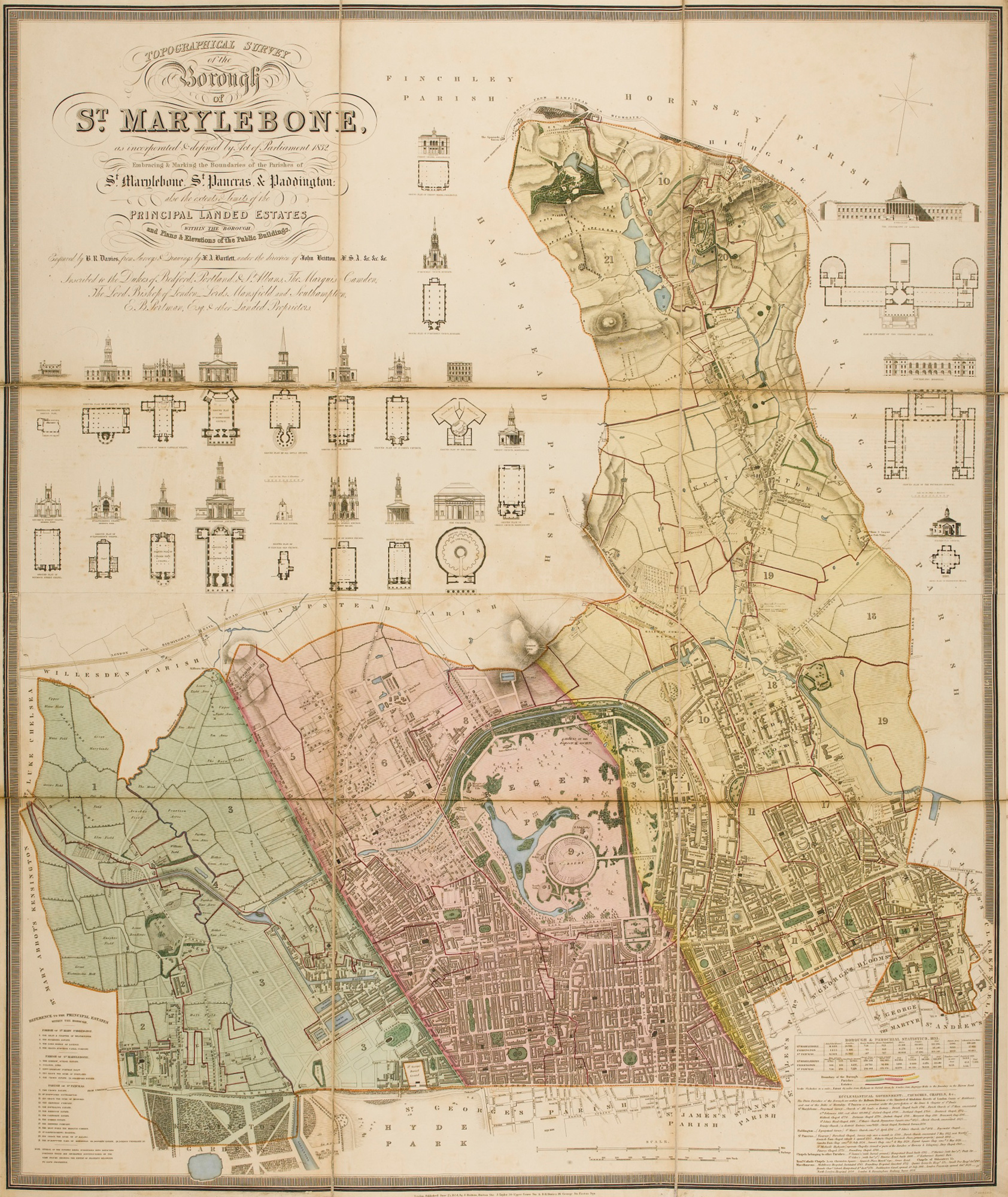
The Ancient Parishes of – west to east – Paddington and St Marylebone (in the modern City of Westminster), and St Pancras (in the modern London Borough of Camden). The core area of Fitzrovia (Tottenham Court), is the south-western part of St Pancras; the remainder of Fitzrovia is in south-eastern St Marylebone.

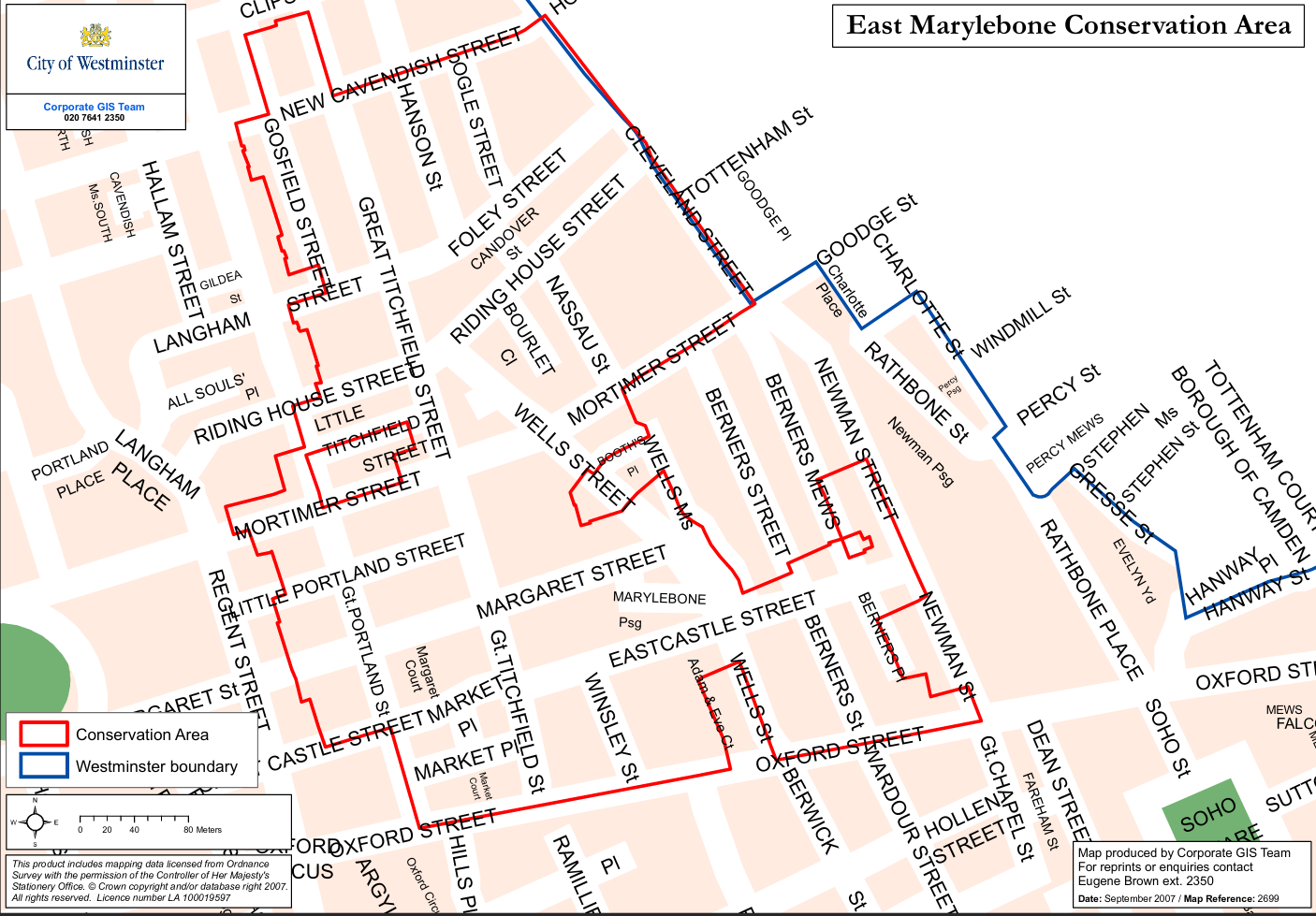
Map showing the boundaries of East Marylebone Conservation Area (equivalent to Western Fitzrovia)

Fitzrovia has never been an administrative unit, so has never had formal boundaries applied, but the local streets' somewhat gridlike pattern has lent itself to informal quadrangular definitions, with Euston Road to the north, Oxford Street to the south and Great Portland Street to the west. Some take Tottenham Court Road as the eastern boundary, but others prefer a wider interpretation, extending to the more easterly Gower Street. By these definitions, the area overlaps the long established and once formally defined districts of Marylebone in the City of Westminster (Western Fitzrovia overlaps almost completely with the officially designated East Marylebone Conservation Area within the modern borough of Westminster), with the core area forming the south-west part of St Pancras in the London Borough of Camden. If the eastern boundary is taken to extend beyond Tottenham Court Road (i.e., to Gower Street) and to also extend south of Torrington Place, then the area overlaps the historic boundaries of Bloomsbury (including St Giles, with which it was long joined as a combined parish).

In 2014 Camden Council and Westminster City Council designated east and west areas as planning policy areas. Together these relate fairly closely to the wider interpretations described above.

== Etymology ==
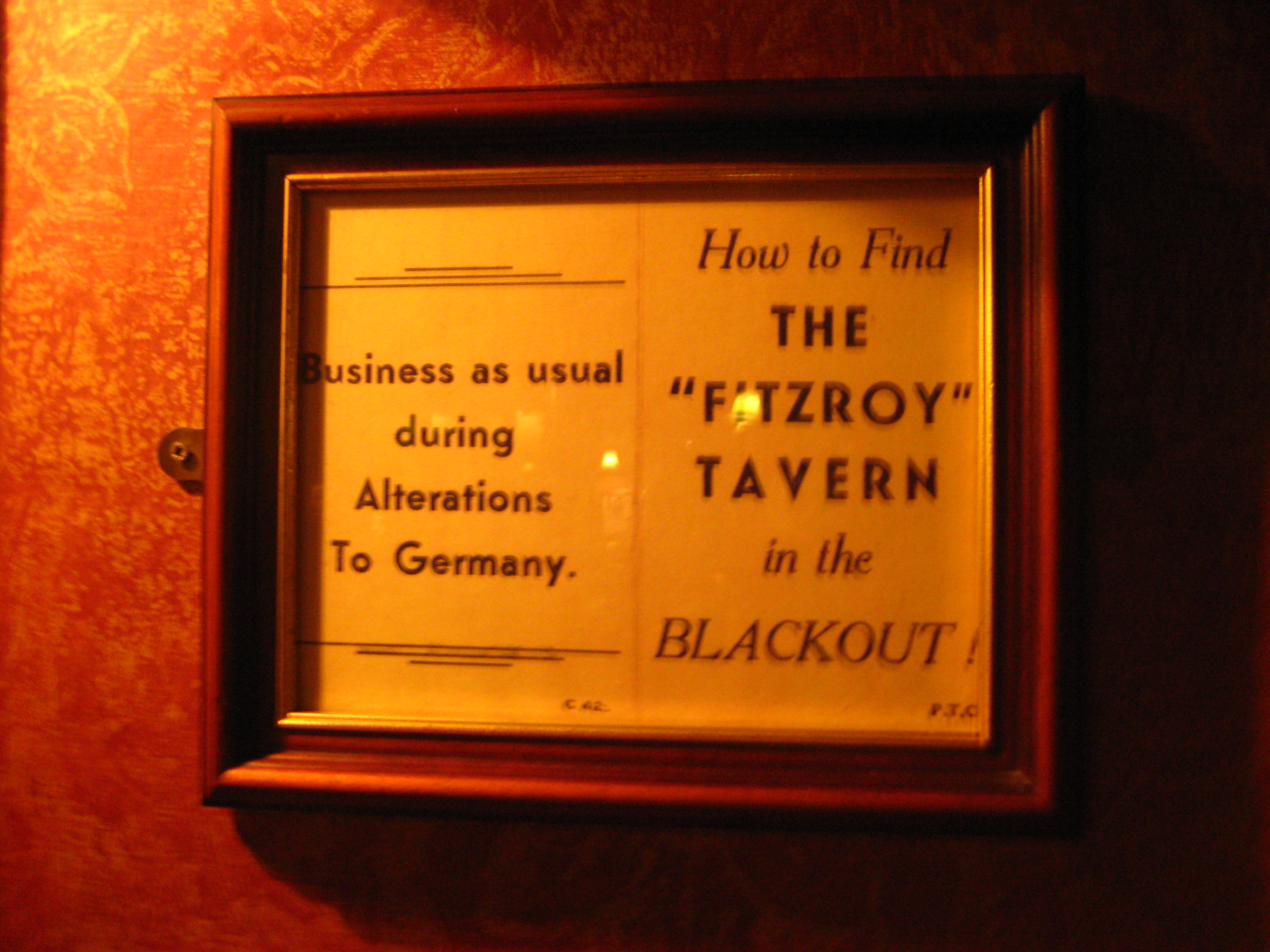
The Fitzroy Tavern may have given its name to Fitzrovia

Fitzrovia is named after either Fitzroy Square or the Fitzroy Tavern, a public house on the corner of Charlotte Street and Windmill Street (both the square and the tavern are in the east of the area). The name of both features derive from the area's origin: until the end of the 19th century the area was an estate of the Dukes of Grafton, descended from Henry FitzRoy, 1st Duke of Grafton, a son of Charles II and Barbara Villiers who bore the royal-bastard surname "FitzRoy", Norman-French for "son of the king".)

The name "Fitzrovia" came into use in the late 1930s among an artistic, bohemian circle that that had begun using the Fitzroy Tavern and surrounding area as a cheap northerly alternative to the West End. After a 1930 mention, an early recorded use in print occurs in the William Hickey gossip column, written by Tom Driberg MP, in the Daily Express in 1940. The writer and dandy Julian MacLaren-Ross recalled in his Memoirs of the Forties that Meary James Thurairajah Tambimuttu, aka "Tambi", editor of Poetry London, had invented and used the name "Fitzrovia". By the time Julian Maclaren-Ross met Tambimuttu in the early 1940s this literary group (which included Dylan Thomas) had moved away from the Fitzroy Tavern, which had become a victim of its own success, and were hanging out in the lesser-known Wheatsheaf and other places in Rathbone Place and Gresse Street. Maclaren-Ross recalls Tambimuttu saying: "Now we go to the Black Horse, the Burglar's Rest, the Marquess of Granby, The Wheatsheaf... in Fitzrovia." Maclaren-Ross replied: "I know the Fitzroy", to which Tambimuttu said: "Ah, that was in the Thirties, now they go to other places. Wait and see." Tambimuttu then took him on a pub crawl. The name, largely forgotten after the avant-garde set moved out in the late 1940s, re-appeared in the 1970s, with its use having waxed and waned since.

== History ==
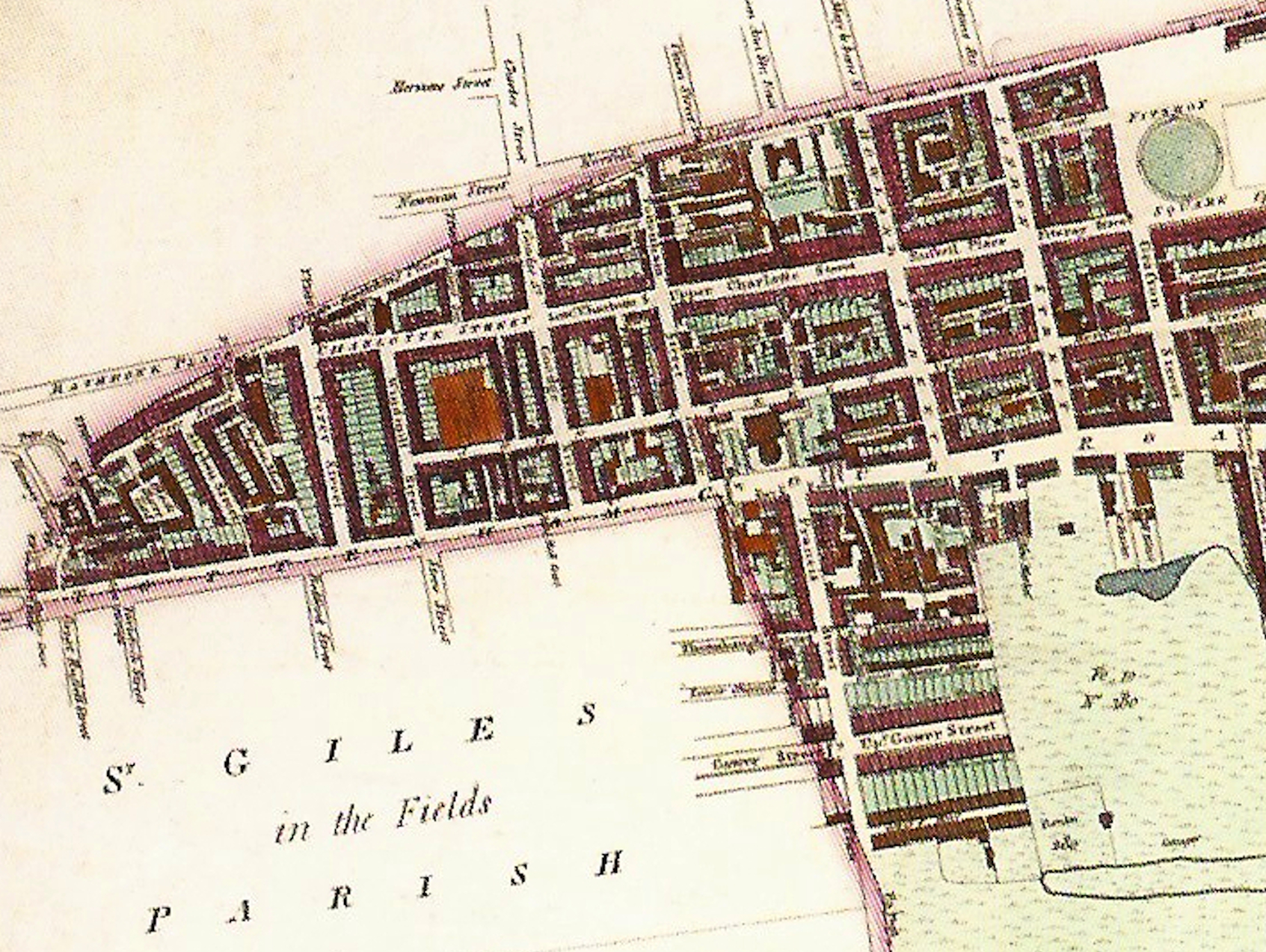
The south-west part of the parish of St Pancras in 1804. The core of the area later known as Fitzrovia. The north is to the right-hand side.

The core area of Fitzrovia has its roots in the ancient manor (estate) of Tottenham Court – first recorded as Þottanheale, from a charter from around AD 1000 (though the initial 'Þ', pronounced 'th', may have been a mistake by the scribe, all subsequent records using an initial 'T'). The manor was subsequently described as Totehele in the Domesday Book of 1086, Totenhale in 1184 and Totenhale Court by 1487. Tottenham Court formed the south-western part of the parish and later borough of St Pancras.

The Fitzroy Tavern was named after Charles FitzRoy (later Baron Southampton), who purchased the Manor of Tottenham Court and built Fitzroy Square, to which he gave his name; nearby Fitzroy Street also bears his name. The square is the most distinguished of the original architectural features of the district, having been designed in part by Robert Adam.

Charles FitzRoy was the grandson of Charles FitzRoy, 2nd Duke of Grafton, hence Grafton Way and Grafton Mews. The name of the Grafton family's country estate is Euston Hall, in Euston, Suffolk, the origin of the names of Euston Station and Euston Road.

The south-western area was first developed by the Duke of Newcastle who established Oxford Market, now the area around Market Place. By the beginning of the 19th century, this part of London was heavily built upon.

The area became a focus of Chartist activities after the Reform Act 1832. Karl Marx attended some Chartist events, including meetings held at Charlotte Street, Tottenham Street and Rathbone Place. The area was host to a number of working men's clubs including The Communist Club at 49 Tottenham Street. University College Hospital was opened, as "North London Hospital", in 1834.

Two of London's oldest surviving residential walkways are in Fitzrovia. Colville Place and the pre-Victorian Middleton Buildings (built 1759) are in the old London style of a way. When the parishes of St Pancras and Marylebone became boroughs in 1900, minor modifications were made to the ancient boundaries, whose pre-urban origin meant it cut awkwardly across the built environment in some places. The western half of Charlotte Place, the western part of part of Charlotte Street and the eastern half of Rathbone Street were transferred to Marylebone, despite these streets' long history within St Pancras and close integration with the urban grain of the St Pancras streets to the east.

The area's most prominent feature is the BT Tower, Cleveland Street, one of London's tallest buildings. It was open to the public until an IRA bomb exploded in the revolving restaurant in 1971. Another notable modern building is the YMCA Indian Student Hostel on Fitzroy Square, one of the few surviving buildings by Ralph Tubbs.

=== 21st century ===
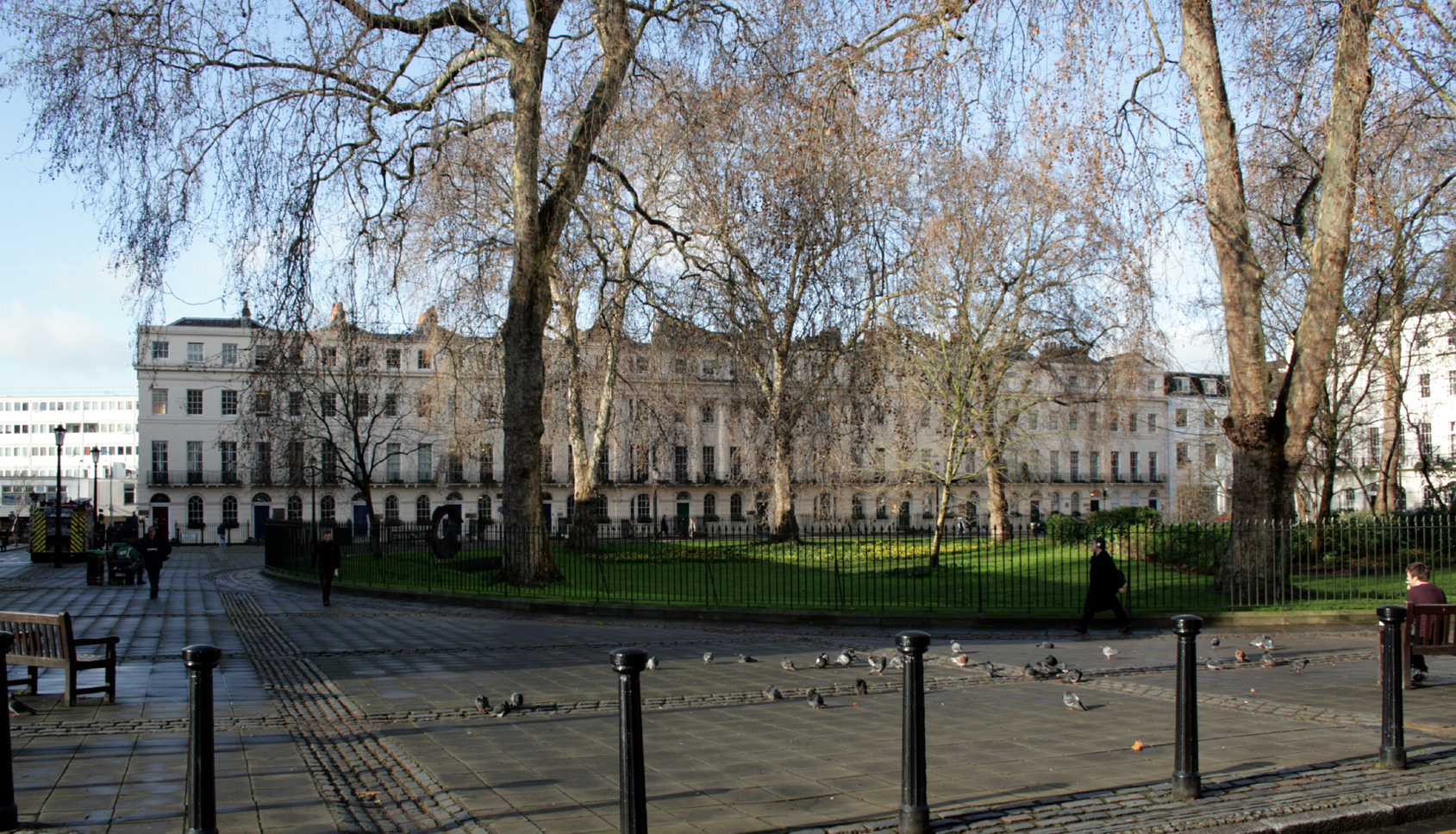
Fitzroy Square

The Middlesex Hospital, which closed in 2005, covered an extensive part of the area, and its redevelopment as Fitzroy Place was completed in 2016.

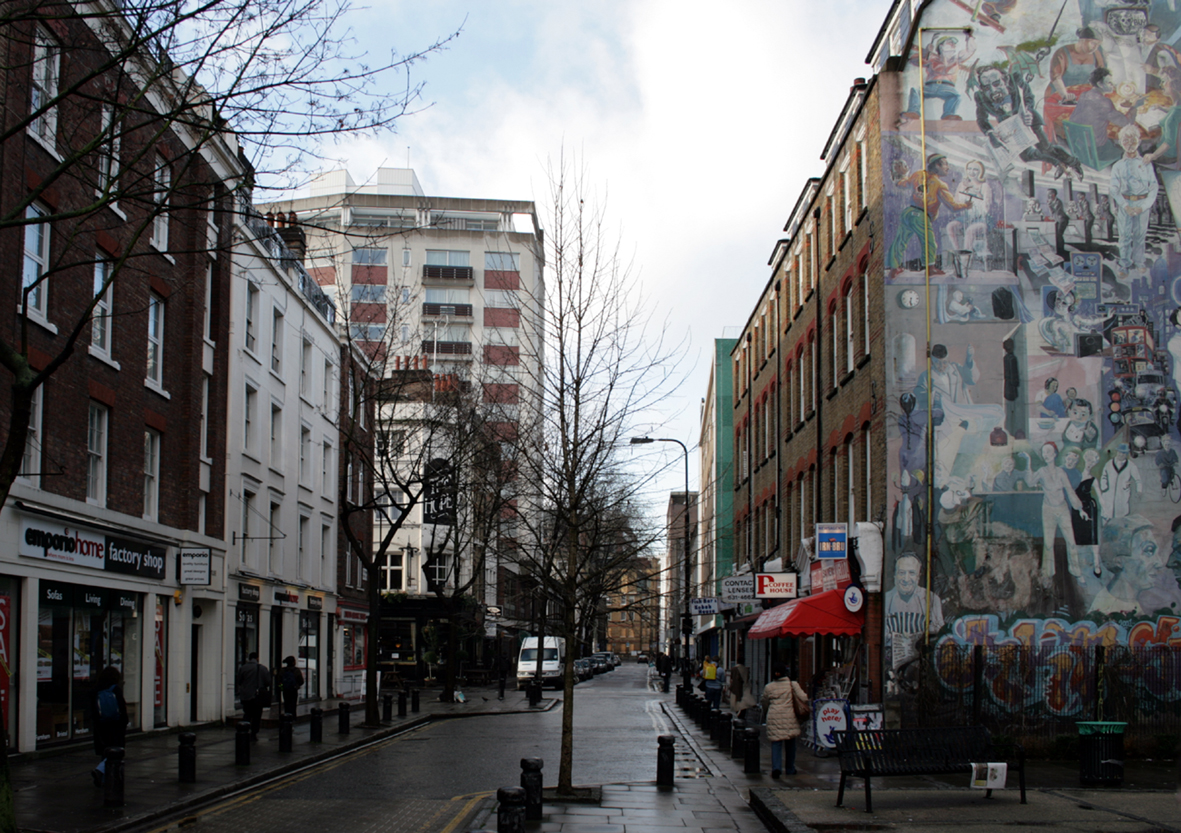
Tottenham Street

Separately, Derwent London plc acquired 800,000 square feet (74,000 m^{2}) of property in the area to add to its existing Fitzrovia portfolio after a merger with London Merchant Securities. The company then held about 1,000,000 square feet (93,000 m^{2}) of property over more than 30 sites in Fitzrovia. In November 2009 the company announced plans to transform part of Fitzrovia into a new retail destination with cafes and restaurants.

Derwent London created the Fitzrovia Partnership, a then-business partnership with Arup, Make Architects and City of London Corporation, with the support of the London Borough of Camden. In July 2010 Derwent London showcased plans for the redevelopment of the Saatchi & Saatchi building in Charlotte Street. Plans produced by Make Architects proposed increasing the density of the site by 50 per cent and adding shops, cafes and a small open space.

Today, over 128,000 people work within 0.5 miles of Fitzrovia, according to the Fitzrovia Partnership's 2014 Economic Report.

=== Georgian workhouse ===
Objection was raised by the local community over plans announced in July 2010 to demolish and redevelop the site of an 18th-century building in Cleveland Street, originally a poorhouse for the parish of St Paul's, Covent Garden, and later the Cleveland Street Workhouse.

== Arts ==
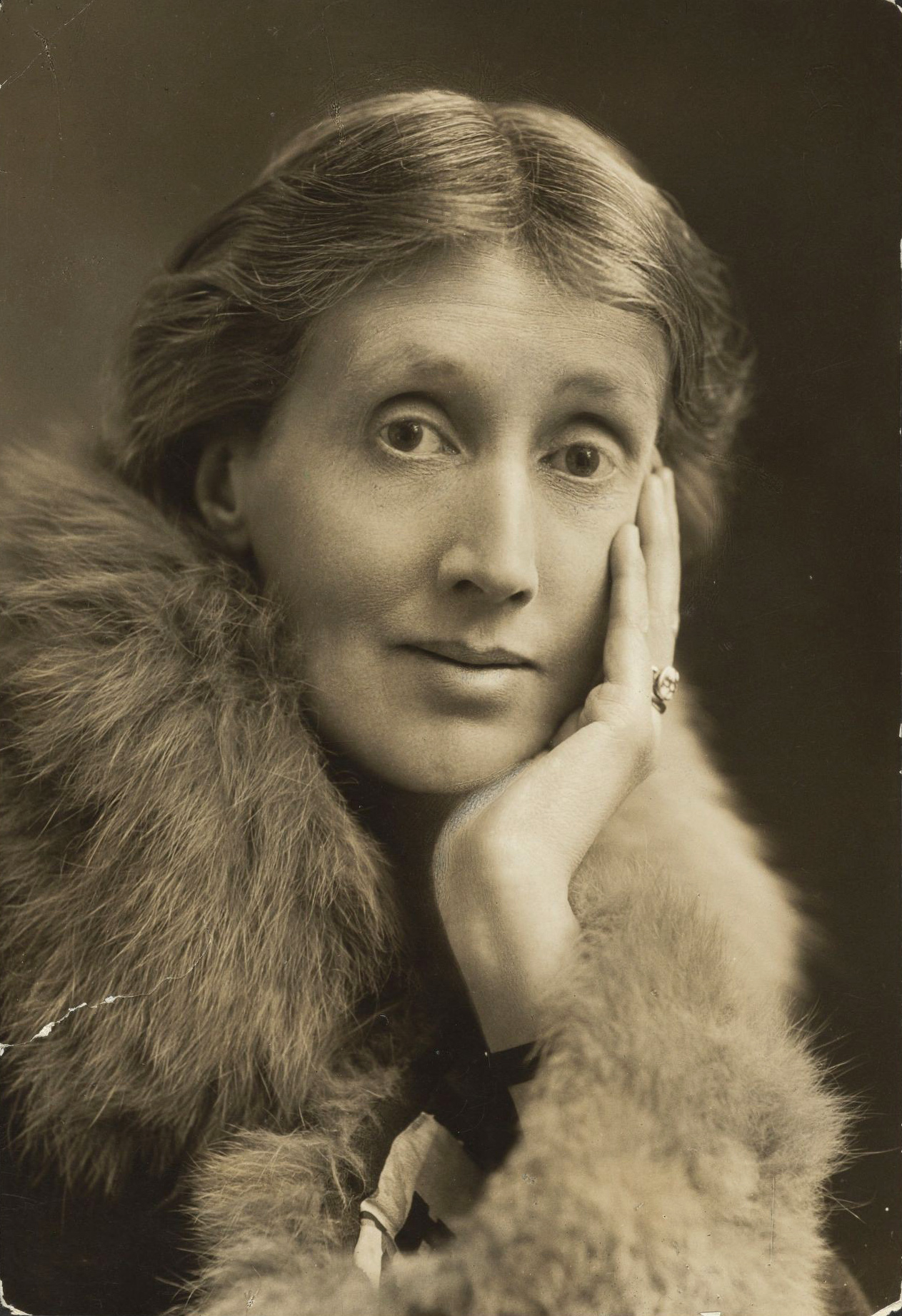
Portrait of Virginia Woolf (1927). Woolf lived in Fitzroy Square from 1907 to 1911.

Fitzrovia was a notable artistic and bohemian centre from roughly from the mid-1920s to the present day. Amongst those known to have lived locally and frequented public houses in the area such as the Fitzroy Tavern and the Wheatsheaf are Augustus John, Quentin Crisp, Dylan Thomas, Aleister Crowley, the racing tipster Prince Monolulu, Nina Hamnett and George Orwell. The Newman Arms on Rathbone Street, features in Orwell's novels Keep the Aspidistra Flying (1936) and Nineteen Eighty-Four (1949), as well as the Michael Powell film Peeping Tom (1960).

Thomas Paine's Rights of Man (1791) was published during his residence at 154 New Cavendish Street, in reply to Edmund Burke (author of Reflections on the Revolution in France, 1790), who lived at 18 Charlotte Street. Artists Richard Wilson and John Constable lived at 76 Charlotte Street at various times. During the 19th century, painters Walter Sickert, Ford Madox Brown, Thomas Musgrave Joy and Whistler lived in Fitzroy Square. George Bernard Shaw and Virginia Woolf also resided at different times on the square, at number 29. The French poets Arthur Rimbaud and Paul Verlaine lived for a time in Howland Street in a house on a site now occupied by offices. Modernist painter Wyndham Lewis lived on Percy Street. The house of Charles Laughton and Elsa Lanchester on Tottenham Street now shows a commemorative blue plaque. 97 Mortimer Street, where H. H. Munro (Saki) lived, now has a blue plaque commemorating his time there. Colin MacInnes author of Absolute Beginners (1959) also resided on Tottenham Street, at number 28, with his publisher Martin Green and his wife Fiona Green.

X. Trapnel, the dissolute novelist (based on the real Julian MacLaren-Ross) in Anthony Powell's Books Do Furnish a Room (1971), spends much of his time holding forth in Fitzrovia pubs. In Saul Bellow's The Dean's December (1982), the eponym, Corde dines at the Étoile, Charlotte Street, on his trips to London, and thinks he "could live happily ever after on Charlotte Street"; Ian McEwan quotes this in Saturday (2005). McEwan lived in Fitzroy Square, and his novel takes place in the area.

The UFO Club, home to Pink Floyd during their spell as the house band of psychedelic London, was held in the basement of 31 Tottenham Court Road. Pink Floyd and Jimi Hendrix also played at the Speakeasy on Margaret Street and Bob Dylan made his London debut at the King & Queen pub on Foley Street. Oxford Street's 100 Club is a major hot-bed for music from the 1960s to the present day, and has roots in 1970s Britain's burgeoning Punk rock movement. The band Coldplay formed in Ramsay Hall, a University College London accommodation on Maple Street. Boy George lived in a squat in Carburton Street in 1981 prior to his success and Neil Howson of Age of Chance lived in Cleveland Street around the same time.

Fitzrovia was also the location of Pollock's Toy Museum, home to erstwhile Toy Theatre, at 1 Scala Street.

At the back of Pollocks and in the next block was the site in 1772 of the Scala Theatre, Tottenham Street – then known as the Cognoscenti Theatre – but it had many names over history: the King's Concert Rooms, the New Theatre, the Regency Theatre, the West London Theatre, the Queen's Theatre, the Fitzroy Theatre, the Prince of Wales and the Royal Theatre until its demolition in 1903 when the Scala Theatre was built on the site for Frank Verity and modelled on La Scala in Milan. It was home to music hall, ballet and pantomime. Before its demolition in 1969, to make way for the office block and hotel that exists now, it was used inside for the filming in 1964 of the Beatles' film A Hard Day's Night, the Mr Universe World competitions, and Sotheby's Auction in 1968 of the Diaghilev costumes and curtains. It was also briefly in the 1970s, in the basement of the office block, the site of the Scala Cinema and later still of Channel 4 Television. The branch of Bertorelli's Italian Restaurant on Charlotte Street was prominently featured in the film Sliding Doors. Guy Ritchie more recently made RocknRolla using Charlotte Mews.

The Fitzrovia Chapel, in Pearson Square, is a Grade II* listed building which hosts exhibitions throughout the year. Stephen Friedman Gallery, Erskine, Hall and Coe and the photographer Richard Ansett have shown at the chapel. The chapel is also used for weddings and fashion shows.

=== Books ===
Books about Fitzrovia include: London's Old Latin Quarter, by E. Beresford Chancellor, published by Jonathan Cape, 1930; Fitzrovia, by Nick Bailey, published by Historical Publications, 1981, ISBN 0-9503656-2-9; and Characters of Fitzrovia by Mike Pentelow and Marsha Rowe, published by Chatto & Windus (2001) and Pimlico (2002), ISBN 0-7126-8015-2.

=== Film ===
Parts of the film Peeping Tom (1960) were shot in and around Newman Passage and Rathbone Street. Parts of Sapphire (1959) were filmed around Charlotte Street. Parts of Phantom Thread (2017) were filmed on Fitzroy Square and Grafton Mews.

=== Music ===
British singer-songwriter Donovan's second album Fairytale features the evocative song Sunny Goodge Street about scoring hashish in the neighborhood. This is the first mention of hash in that era's music. Donovan was the first of his ilk to be busted for it, by no coincidence he points out. The song is a Fitzrovia source for its mention of the Goodge Street platform, perhaps the dollhouses, the song's then-new jazzy feel, and overall lyrics, that foreshadowed life in urban London.

== Business ==
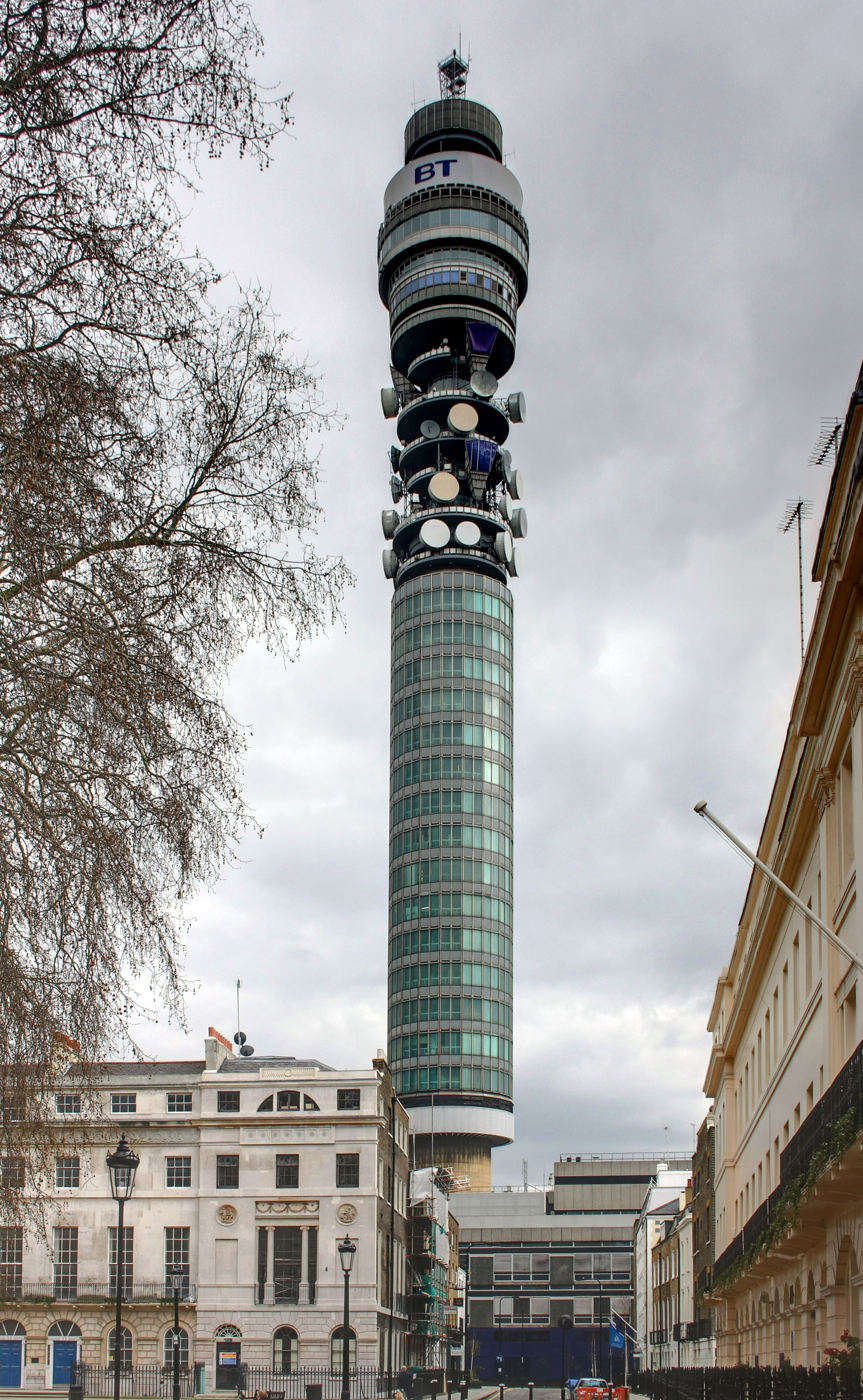
View of the BT Tower from Fitzroy Square

Initially, Fitzrovia was largely an area of well-to-do tradesmen and craft workshops, with Edwardian mansion blocks built by the Quakers to allow theatre employees to be close to work. Modern property uses are diverse, but Fitzrovia is still well known for its fashion industry, now mainly comprising wholesalers and HQs of the likes of Arcadia Group. New media outfits have replaced the photographic studios of the 1970s–90s, often housed in warehouses built to store the changing clothes of their original industry — fashion. Dewar Studios, leading fashion and modelling photographers based in Great Titchfield Street continue the traditional link to studios. Charlotte Street was for many years the home of the British advertising industry and is now known for its many and diverse restaurants. Today the district still houses several major advertising agencies including Saatchi & Saatchi and TBWA as well as CHI & Partners, Fallon, Dare Digital and Target Media Group. However, the modular ex-BT building occupied by McCann-Erickson was demolished in 2006 after the firm moved to an art deco home in nearby Bloomsbury.

A number of television production and post-production companies are based in the area, MTV Networks Europe, Nickelodeon, rogue and CNN Europe being headquartered here. ITN used to be based at 48 Wells Street during the 1980s, with its Factual Department still housed on Mortimer Street, and Channel 4 was, until 1994, situated on Charlotte Street, and talkbackTHAMES is currently based on Newman Street, with additional offices at 1 Stephen Street. Dennis Publishing is based close by, on Cleveland Street, and London's Time Out magazine and City Guide is created and edited on Tottenham Court Road on the eastern border of Fitzrovia. Many other media companies are based within the area, including Informa, Arqiva and Digital UK.

Reflecting Fitzrovia's connections with the avant-garde the area has a concentration of commercial art galleries and dealers.

Hellmuth, Obata and Kassabaum, an international firm of architects, interior designers, landscape architects, urban planners and advanced strategists are based in the Qube on Whitfield Street, along with Make Architects. Derwent London also have a showroom in Whitfield Street. Derwent London own about 1,000,000 square feet (93,000 m^{2}) of property in Fitzrovia: about one fifth of their total portfolio The Langham Estate have a similarly sized land holding in West Fitzrovia. A number of structural engineering consultants are based in offices on Newman Street and the world headquarters of Arup is on Fitzroy Street although they own many of the surrounding buildings (which are in the process of being redeveloped into modern offices). There were once many hospitals (including Middlesex Hospital, which closed in 2006, and St Luke's Hospital for the Clergy, now re-opened after refurbishment). Several embassies (El Salvador, Mozambique, Turkmenistan and Croatia) are found amongst the many public houses. Retail use spills into parts of Fitzrovia from Oxford Street and Tottenham Court Road, which are two of the principal shopping streets in central London.

The Fitzrovia Partnership was formed in 2009 as "a business-led initiative bringing together local businesses to add value and make a tangible difference to the management of Fitzrovia." Since August 2012, the Fitzrovia Partnership has been a formal Business Improvement District (BID). Activities have included installation of Christmas lighting in Tottenham Court Road, Charlotte Street and Fitzroy Street, an annual Christmas market, Feast at Fitzrovia summer festival, and a commitment to local job creation, support for small businesses and a focus on sustainability and improving air quality. In 2011, the BID came in for criticism, with damage to trees in Charlotte Street by Christmas lighting described by the Fitzrovia News as vandalism. The BID also operates a separate "consumer" facing brand – Enjoy Fitzrovia – to promote the area as a destination for shopping, eating, and art within London's West End. In October 2014, The Fitzrovia Partnership teamed up with local resident Griff Rhys Jones to create the Dylan Thomas in Fitzrovia festival, a week of poetry, art and comedy across the area, celebrating the life and times of Dylan Thomas in the area.

== Education and research ==
The University of Westminster has buildings on New Cavendish Street, Wells Street and Great Portland Street. University College London has buildings on Torrington Place, Huntley Street and New Cavendish Street. There are University of London halls of residences on Charlotte Street and Fitzroy Street. The Institute for Fiscal Studies is based at Ridgmount Street and the Royal Anthropological Institute Main office is at 50 Fitzroy Street.

All Souls' Church of England Primary School is at Foley Street. The building is Grade II listed. Southbank International School has two of its campuses located within the area, one on Portland Place and another on the northern end of Conway street (just off Warren Street). The Conway campus houses students from grade 11 and 12 where they study the IB Diploma Programme. Fashion Retail Academy is at Gresse Street.

== Social conditions ==
Although often described as upmarket and home to some celebrities, like much of inner London, Fitzrovia residents have a wide disparity of wealth and the area contains a mix of affluent property owners as well as many private, council and housing association tenants. The neighbourhood is classified as above-averagely deprived, and parts of it have the worst living environment in the country according to a government report that ranked sub-wards by quality of housing, air quality and the number of road traffic accidents.

== Housing and community action ==
Fitzrovia Festival poster 1974

The area lost much of its housing stock to other land uses during the 1960s, leading to the creation of resident's groups seeking to preserve the residential character of the district.

The Charlotte Street Association was formed in 1970, and the Whitfield Study Group began issuing The Tower (later renamed Fitzrovia News) newspaper from 1973. At this time the Newspaper was distributed in an area between Euston Road and Oxford Street, Great Portland Street and Tottenham Court Road. The newspaper called the area Towerland, after the then new BT Tower.

The name Fitzrovia was revived when the first Fitzrovia Festival was held in 1973. The festival had the theme "The people live here!". The organisers sought a name for the festival and an elderly resident named Eric Singer suggested using the name Fitzrovia, a name he remembered hearing in the 1940s, but which had fallen out of use. The purpose of the festival, still held on a regular basis, was to demonstrate that among the offices, restaurants and cafes there was a residential community that wanted its voice heard. The adoption of the name by the campaign groups, covering self-defined areas, meant the name Fitzrovia became applied to a fairly well defined area, one larger than that to which it was once loosely applied. The Newspaper continued to use the names Towerland, Fitzrovia and East Marylebone (for the area in the City of Westminster) in parallel.

The following year, the Fitzrovia Neighbourhood Association was formed and raised money to create a neighbourhood centre in a Grade II listed disused glass shop on the corner of Tottenham Street and Goodge Place. The Fitzrovia Neighbourhood Centre was opened in 1975.

The Fitzrovia Neighbourhood Centre continues to be a place of community action and a venue for voluntary groups to meet, and is the office of the Fitzrovia News which is produced four times a year by volunteers drawn from the residential community. An advice and information service and community projects, including the annual Fitzrovia Festival, are also delivered from the Neighbourhood Centre. The Fitzrovia News and Fitzrovia Festival are both supported by the Fitzrovia Neighbourhood Association.

The new Fitzrovia Community Centre is located at 2 Foley Street in the City of Westminster, just across from the Camden borough boundary. The Centre arose from a town planning (section 106) agreement between University College London Hospital (UCLH) and the London Borough of Camden. This agreement provided funding to provide the new community centre. The building has undergone a major refurbishment and designed to be a modern and welcoming multi-purpose building, with a range of rooms available for large and small groups and individuals.

Two new neighbourhood planning groups are currently in the process of formation. The Fitzrovia West and Fitzrovia East Neighbourhood Areas have been established by Westminster City Council and London Borough of Camden respectively. In addition FitzWest, as it has become known has made further application to become a Neighbourhood Forum.

== Transport links ==
=== Nearest railway station ===
- Euston to the north east

Paddington, Marylebone, Kings Cross and St Pancras railway stations are all relatively close to Fitzrovia although none (including Euston) is within the boundary of the area.

=== Nearest London Underground stations ===
- Goodge Street
- Oxford Circus
- Warren Street
- Great Portland Street
- Regent's Park
- Euston Square
- Tottenham Court Road
