= The Wheatsheaf, Fitzrovia =

Pub in London, England

Coordinates: 51.5177°N 0.1341°W

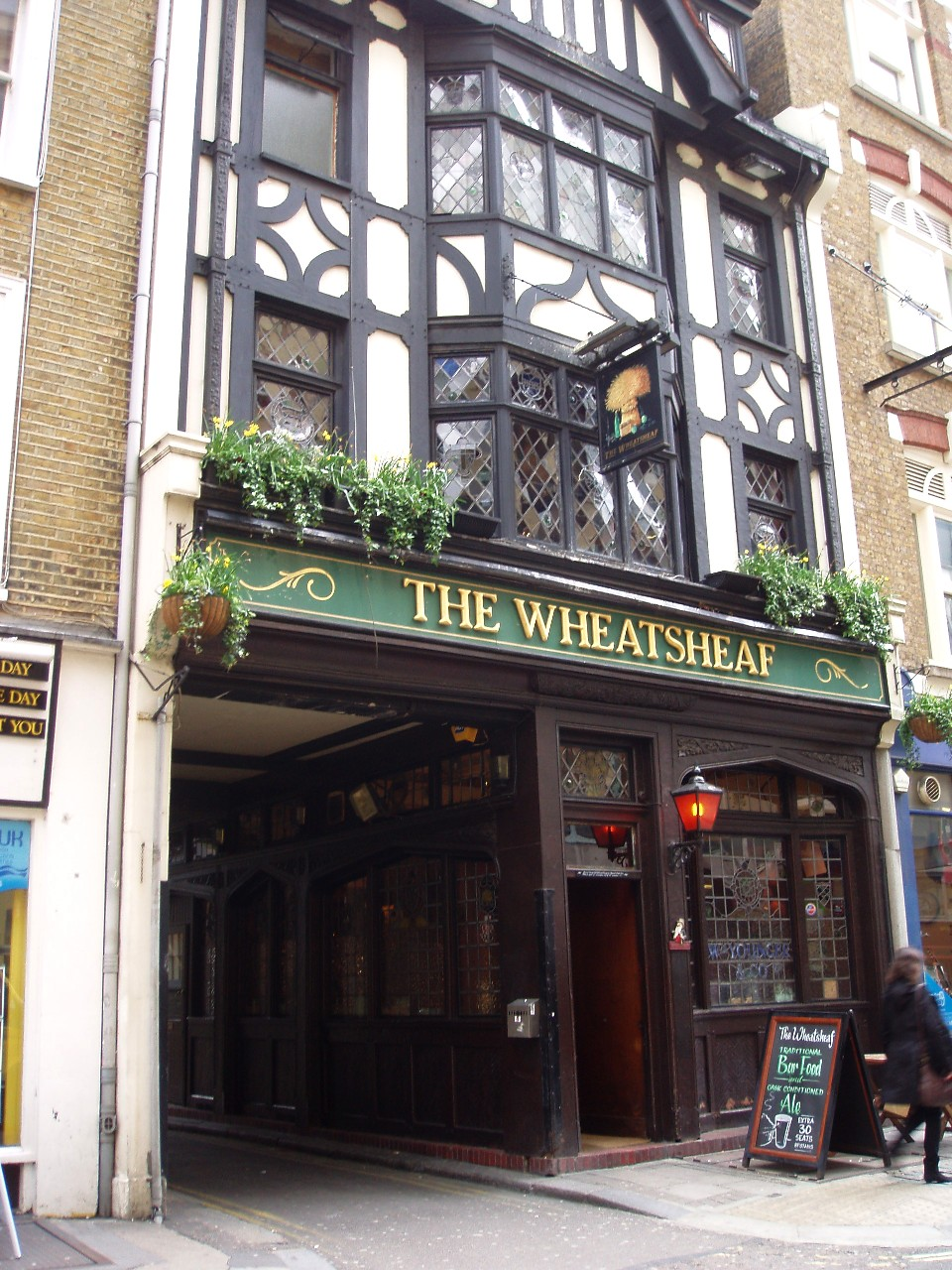
The Wheatsheaf

The Wheatsheaf is a pub in Rathbone Place, Fitzrovia, London, that was popular with London's bohemian set in the 1930s. Its customers included George Orwell, Dylan Thomas, Edwin Muir and Humphrey Jennings, who were known for a while as the Wheatsheaf writers. Other habitués included the singer and dancer Betty May, and the writer and surrealist poet Philip O'Connor, Nina Hamnett, Julian Maclaren-Ross, Anthony Carson and Quentin Crisp.

== Dylan Thomas ==
In spring 1936, the poet Dylan Thomas met Caitlin Macnamara (1913–1994), a 22-year-old blonde-haired, blue-eyed dancer of Irish descent. She had run away from home, intent on making a career in dance, and aged 18 joined the chorus line at the London Palladium. Introduced by the artist Augustus John, Caitlin's lover, they met in The Wheatsheaf. Laying his head in her lap, a drunken Thomas proposed. Thomas liked to comment that he and Caitlin were in bed together ten minutes after they first met. Although Caitlin initially continued her relationship with John, she and Thomas began a correspondence, and in the second half of 1936 were courting. They married at the register office in Penzance, Cornwall, on 11 July 1937.

== New Sheridan Club ==
Social off shoot of the Chap magazine, met there every first Wednesday of the month from 2005 to 2025. https://www.newsheridanclub.co.uk
