= Fitzroy Tavern =

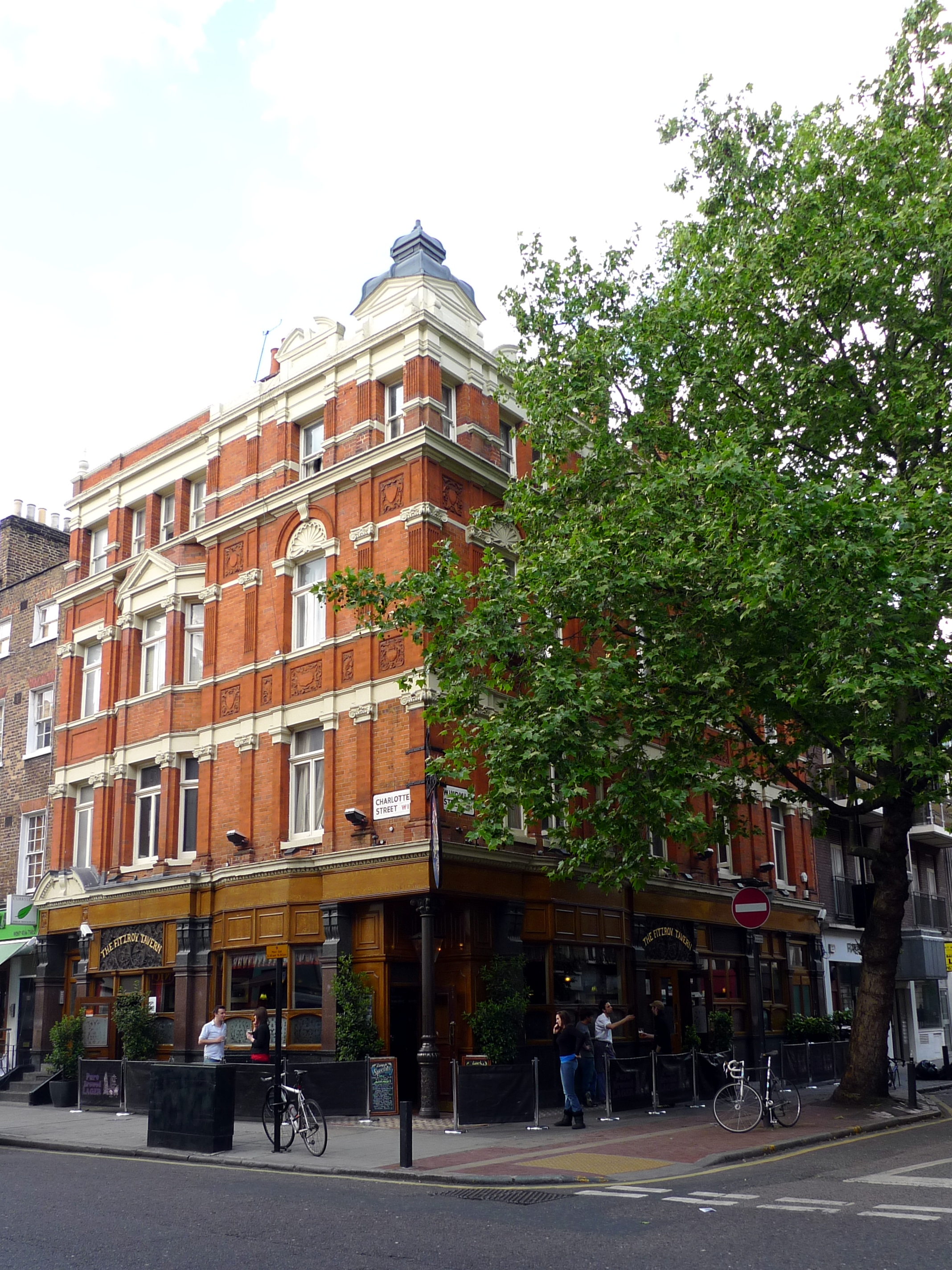
- Fitzroy Tavern in 2009

- Location within London Borough of Camden Location within Greater London

General information
- Type: Public house
- Location: 16 Charlotte Street, London, England
- Coordinates: 51.5186°N 0.1347°W

The Fitzroy Tavern is a public house situated at Charlotte Street in the Fitzrovia district of central London, England, owned by Samuel Smith Old Brewery.

It became famous during a period spanning the 1920s to the mid-1950s as a meeting place for many of London's artists, intellectuals and bohemians such as Jacob Epstein, Nina Hamnett, Dylan Thomas, Augustus John, and George Orwell.

It is named either directly or indirectly after the Fitzroy family, Dukes of Grafton, who owned much of the land on which Fitzrovia was built.

The building was originally constructed as the Fitzroy Coffee House, in 1883, and converted to a pub (called "The Hundred Marks") in 1887, by W. M. Brutton. In 1919, Polish emigre Judah Kleinfeld took over the pub and renamed it the Fitzroy Tavern. The licence then passed to his daughter Annie and her husband Charles Allchild who ran it into the 1950s.

His granddaughter Sally Fiber who worked behind the bar from a very young age eventually wrote a history of the pub, The Fitzroy: The Autobiography of a London Tavern with the help of Clive Powell-Williams. There are photographs on the walls of both Michael Bentine and Dylan Thomas drinking in the pub.

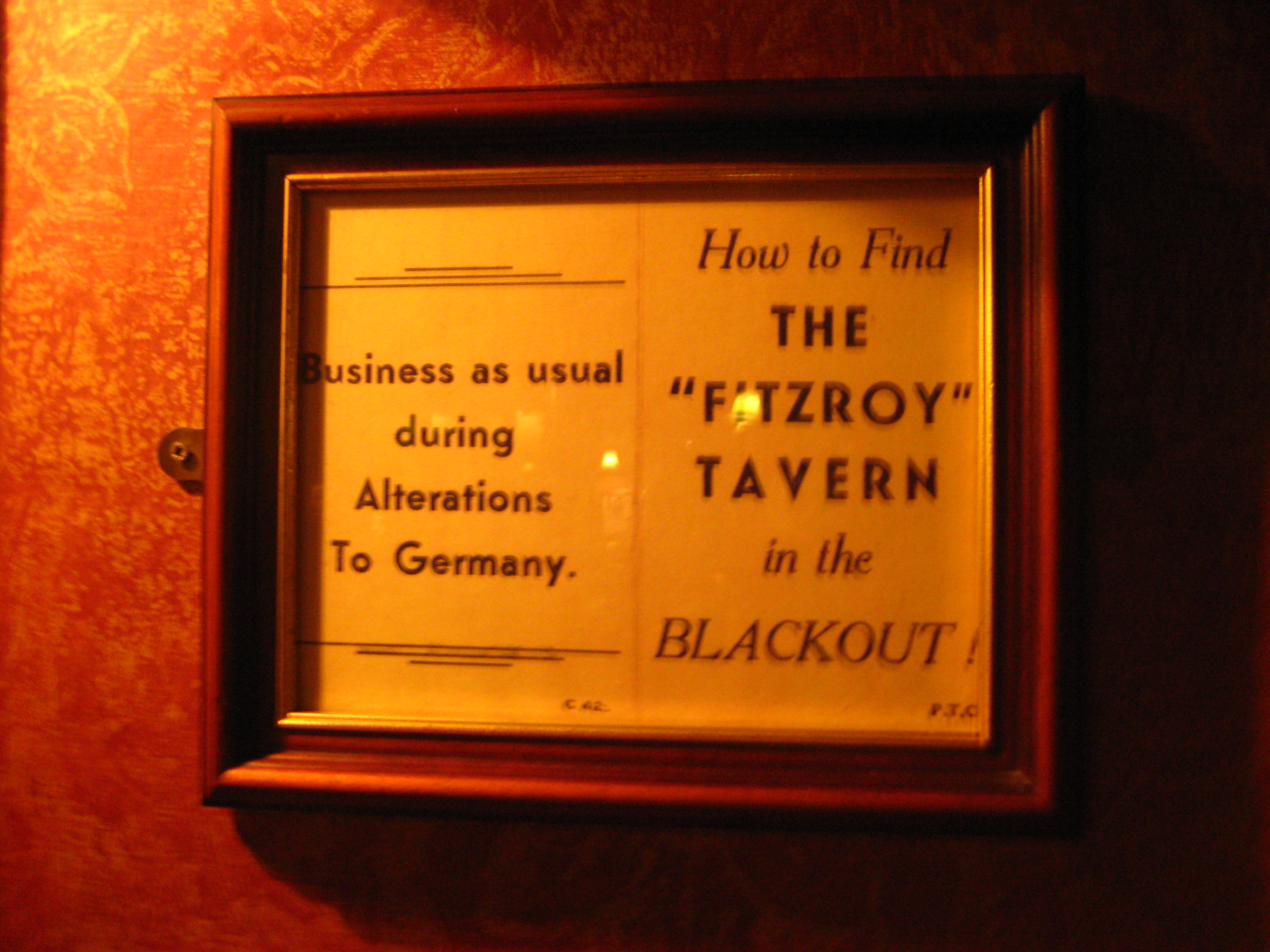
Wartime notice on the wall of the Fitzroy Tavern

By the 1990s, the Fitzroy came to be closely associated with a very small group of Doctor Who fans, who held regular meetings. Many figures associated with the show were regular patrons, including Russell T Davies, Steven Moffat, Paul Cornell, Nicholas Briggs and Robert Shearman. This group contributed to the franchise since the 1990s, beginning as prominent writers in the Virgin New Adventures series of Doctor Who novels, and going on to control production of the show itself after the 2005 revival.

Since 2000 it has been the home of the Pear Shaped Comedy Club which runs every Wednesday in the downstairs bar.

In 2018, the pub was given a pub design award by CAMRA for its 2015 refurbishment, in which its original Victorian appearance was retained and revived. Polished mahogany partitions with acid-etched glass were installed downstairs to recreate the original snugs, while wrought-iron pub signs in keeping with the originals were erected outside.
