= Charlotte Street =

Street in Fitzrovia, London

Coordinates: 51.51959°N 0.13591°W

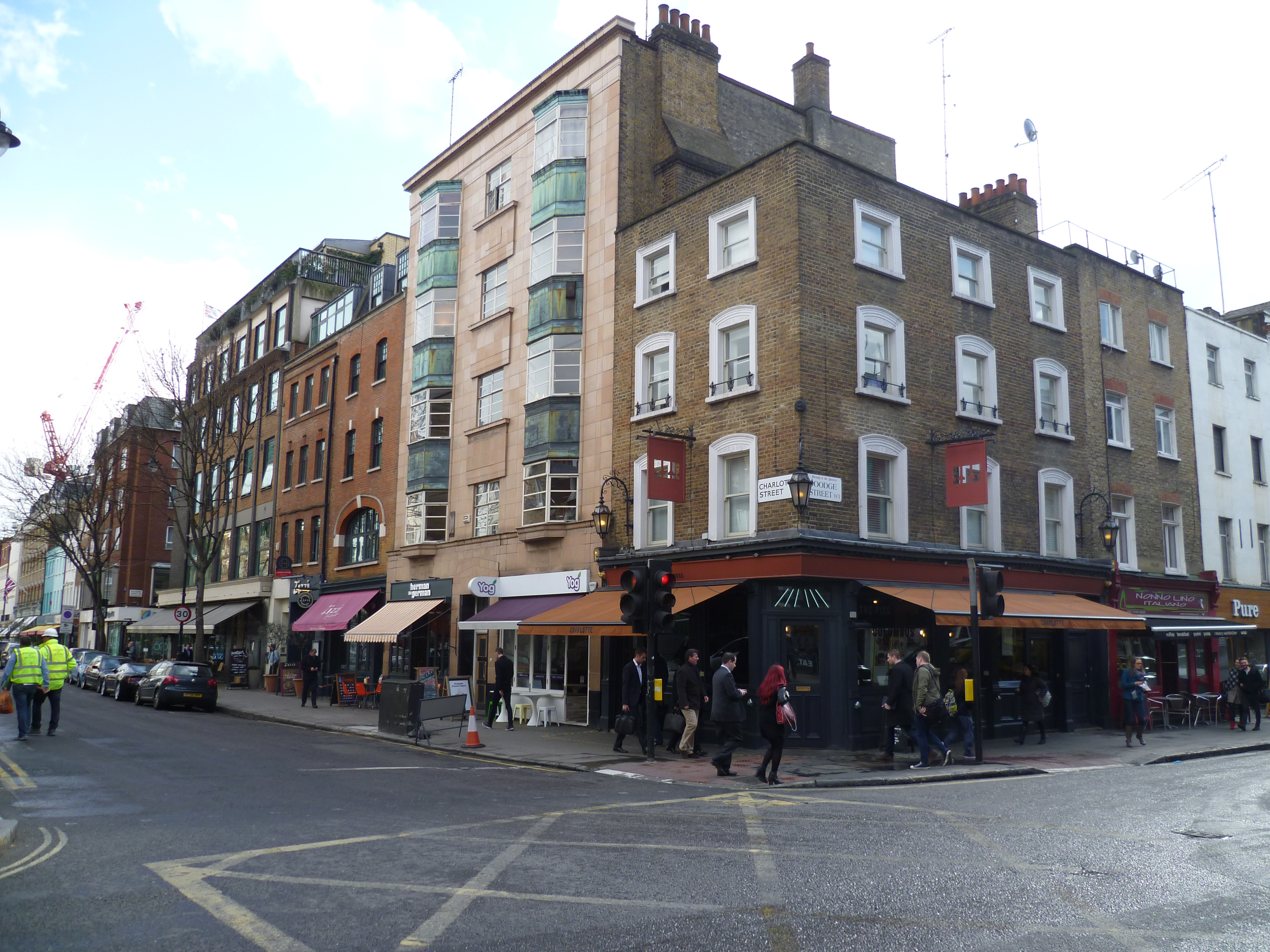
Corner of Charlotte Street and Goodge Street

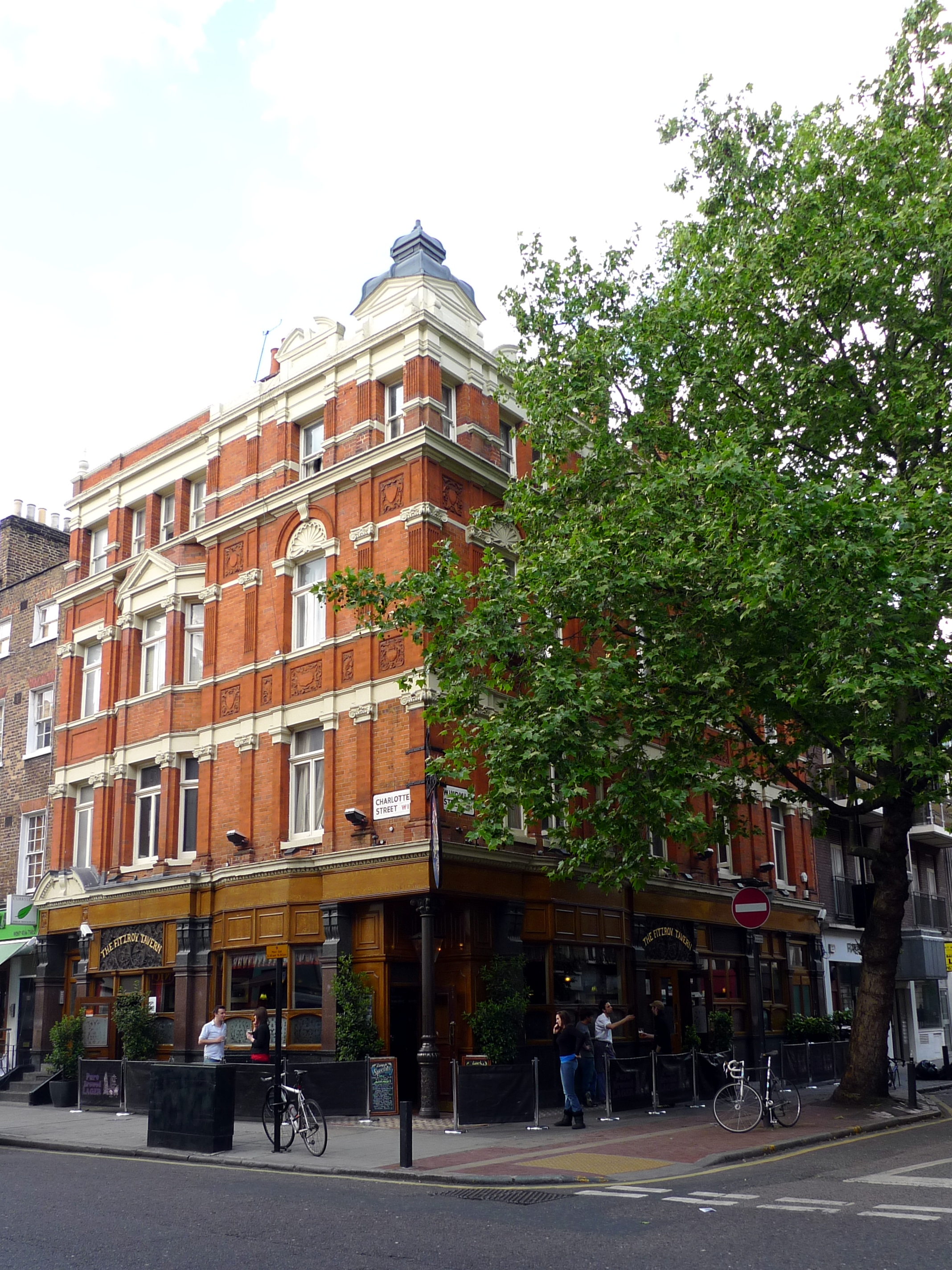
The Fitzroy Tavern, at 16 Charlotte Street

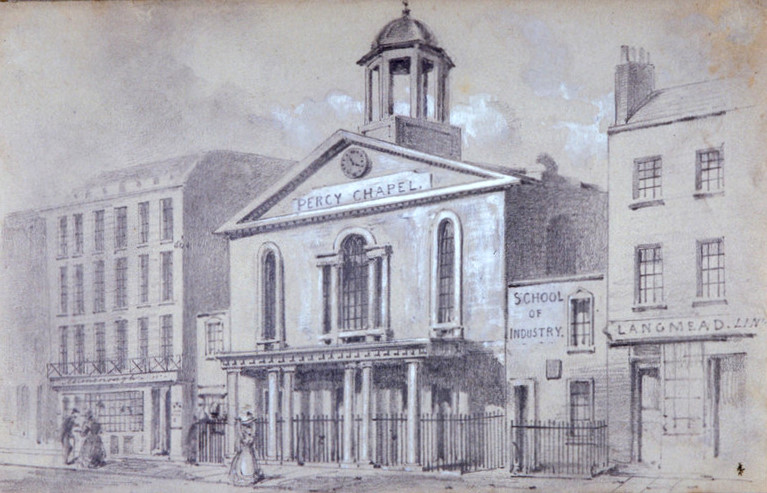
Percy Chapel, Charlotte Street, 1857 (demolished 1867)

Charlotte Street is a street in Fitzrovia, historically part of the parish and borough of St Pancras, in central London. It has been described, together with its northern and southern extensions (Fitzroy Street and Rathbone Place), as the spine of Fitzrovia.

The southern half of the street has many restaurants and cafes, and a lively nightlife; the northern part is more mixed in character, and includes the large office building of the advertising agency Saatchi & Saatchi, and a University College London student hall of residence, Astor College. The street has a significant residential population living above the ground floor. It gives its name to two architectural Conservation Areas: Charlotte Street conservation area (Camden) and Charlotte Street West conservation area (City of Westminster)

== History ==
Charlotte Street, formed in 1763, was named in honour of Queen Charlotte who married King George III in 1761. Together with Charlotte Place (previously Little Charlotte Street), it was one of four streets in and around Fitzrovia which took her name. The other two have since been renamed Hallam Street and Bloomsbury Street. Fitzrovia itself was named after the Fitzroy Tavern, a public house on Charlotte Street.

From the 19th century onward, the parish and borough of St Pancras was home to a large, mostly middle-class, German population. Charlotte Street and the surrounding locality was a thriving centre of this community, and the street acquired the nickname Charlottenstrasse, after its famous Berlin namesake. Other areas of St Pancras which had a large German community included Camden Town, Kentish Town and nearby Kings Cross, where the German Gymnasium (now a restaurant) survives as a legacy.

The parish and borough boundaries of St Pancras (now part of the London Borough of Camden) and the parish and borough of Marylebone ran through the area, mostly along Cleveland Street; these ancient boundaries, which are many centuries old, have been inherited by the modern boroughs. Charlotte Street (and Charlotte Place) were wholly in St Pancras, but a minor adjustment to that boundary around 1900 now means that a small part of the boundary separating the London Borough of Camden and the City of Westminster runs along a short section of Charlotte Street.

== Location ==
The nearest tube station is Goodge Street to the east. Goodge Street itself crosses Charlotte Street halfway up. To the east and parallel with Charlotte Street is Tottenham Court Road. To the south is Oxford Street.

== Notable buildings ==
The street has a mix of eighteenth-, nineteenth- and twentieth-century buildings and has reputation for its numerous restaurants serving a wide range of cuisine.

Sass's Academy, an important art school founded in the early 19th century by Henry Sass, was located in a house at 6 Charlotte Street, on the corner with Streatham Street. Many notable British artists such as William Powell Frith, John Millais, Charles West Cope, William Edward Frost and Dante Gabriel Rossetti received their early training there. In 1842 its management passed to Francis Stephen Cary. (This refers to the Charlotte Street that has since been renamed Bloomsbury Street.)

The Scala Theatre, opened in 1905, was located on Charlotte Street. A theatre first stood on the site in 1772. From 1865 to 1882, the theatre was known as the Prince of Wales's Theatre. It was demolished in 1969, after being destroyed by a fire.

The Fitzroy Tavern at 16 Charlotte Street was built as a coffeehouse in 1883. It became famous during the 1920s to the mid-1950s as a meeting place for artists, intellectuals and bohemians, including Dylan Thomas, Lawrence Durrell, Augustus John, and George Orwell.

The original Channel 4 television headquarters was at 60 Charlotte Street, before the channel moved to 124 Horseferry Road in 1994. The commercial radio station Xfm London originally had its studios in Charlotte Street before moving to Leicester Square.

Gennaro Contaldo's restaurant Passione was at 10 Charlotte Street between 1999 and March 2009.

The Charlotte Street Hotel is a boutique hotel that opened at 15 Charlotte Street in 2000, its interiors decorated with modern British art.

The Charlotte Street Gallery is at 28 Charlotte Street.

== Notable residents ==
- John Constable, the English Romantic painter, died at 76 Charlotte Street on 31 March 1837.
- The artist and traveller Edward Thomas Daniell was born on 6 June 1804 at Charlotte Street.
- The late 18th century painter George Morland lived in Charlotte Street.
- Pierre-Noël Violet, early 19th century miniaturist painter, lived in Charlotte Street.
- Wadham Wyndham purchased a house in Charlotte Street in 1771 and died there in 1812.
- Theresa Berkley was an early 19th-century dominatrix who ran a brothel in at 28 Charlotte Street (now 84–94 Hallam Street), specialising in flagellation.
- The Victorian artist William Powell Frith studied at Sass's Academy.
- The painter R. R. McIan, noted for his romantic portrayals of Scottish Highlanders, lived at No. 36
- The poet Charlotte Mew lived at No. 64
- The architect Sir Robert Smirke lived at No. 81 from 1786 to 1804.

The family home of Christina Rossetti and Dante Gabriel Rossetti, associated with the Pre-Raphaelite Brotherhood, were at 38 Charlotte Street (now 105 Hallam Street) and later at 50 Charlotte Street.

== In fiction ==
Charlotte Street is the address of the W.O.O.C.(P) intelligence organization in the early spy novels by Len Deighton.

Mr “Mybug” from the novel Cold Comfort Farm lives on Charlotte Street

== See also ==
- List of eponymous roads in London
