= Bitten by the Tarantula and other writing =

Bitten by the Tarantula and other writing is a 2005 compilation (ISBN 0948238321) of Julian MacLaren Ross's writings.

It contains the novella "Bitten by the Tarantula", together with stories, fragments of unfinished fiction, six major essays on cinema, pieces on literature, and seven literary parodies. The collection reflects the breadth of his reading, extending from Robert Louis Stevenson to pulp novelist Robert Bloch.

== Reception ==
In a positive review, The Guardian called the piece on A Dance to the Music of Time masterly. It also noted that "The film criticism was ahead of its time in its appreciation of Hitchcock and film noir. The parodies combine precise pastiche with criticism; one attracted a fan letter from PG Wodehouse, another resulted in a libel writ from HE Bates."

The Times Literary Supplement was also generally positive about what it called "by far the strangest and most eclectic" of the posthumous collections. Of the title novella, it said that "despite its brevity, and its apparent lack of anything resembling a coherent plot, it is a triumph". It concluded that the collection, "however bleak and fragmentary, stands as a vital emblem of his endurance and his considerable intellectual panache".
