= Of Love and Hunger =

1947 novel by Julian MacLaren-Ross

First edition

Of Love and Hunger is a novel by Julian MacLaren-Ross, first published in the United Kingdom in 1947 by Allan Wingate. The novel was based on MacLaren-Ross' time as a vacuum cleaner salesman.

== Plot summary ==
Richard Fanshawe sells vacuum cleaners for a living and has an unhappy love affair with Sukie, the wife of his friend.

== Reception ==
John Self of The Times praised it, calling it a "comic masterpiece" and praising the style of the narration. D. J. Taylor, writing for The Guardian described Of Love and Hunger as the "one indisputed masterpiece" of MacLaren-Ross. Elizabeth Bowen stated that the novel proved that MacLaren-Ross was "a writer of the first rank".

BBC broadcast Of Love And Hunger on Book at Bedtime in October 2016.
