= King's Head, Tooting =

Listed pub in London, England

King's Head
- The pub in 2022

General information
- Type: Public house
- Location: 84 Upper Tooting Road, Tooting, London, England
- Coordinates: 51.4341°N 0.1627°W
- Year built: 1896; 130 years ago
- Renovated: 2002 and 2015 (refurbished)
- Owner: Greene King

Design and construction
- Architect: W. M. Brutton
- Designations

Listed Building – Grade II
- Official name: The Kings Head public house
- Designated: 24 July 1981
- Reference no.: 1065499

Website
- Official website

The King's Head is a Grade II listed public house on Upper Tooting Road in Tooting, London, England. Designed by W. M. Brutton and completed in 1896, it is a notable example of gin-palace architecture, retaining a largely intact historic interior. The pub is included in the Campaign for Real Ale (CAMRA)'s National Inventory of Historic Pub Interiors with a three-star rating, and its interior is regarded by CAMRA as being of "outstanding national historic importance".

== History ==
Built in 1896 to the designs of W. M. Brutton, the public house retains a notably complete interior. Its symmetrical design and rich decorative treatment are characteristic of late 19th-century gin-palace architecture.

On 24 July 1981, the King's Head was designated a Grade II listed building. It was included on the Campaign for Real Ale (CAMRA)'s National Inventory of Historic Pub Interiors before the inventory's grading system was revised. Under the revised scheme, it is rated three stars and its interior is regarded as being "of outstanding national historic importance".

A refurbishment carried out in 2002 introduced relatively few changes to the historic interior, the principal alteration being the creation of an opening in the front screen to allow movement between the two sides of the pub. Following its acquisition by Greene King, the pub reopened in August 2015 after a further refurbishment by Spirit Pub Company under its Taylor Walker brand. As of October 2026, the freehold was owned by Greene King.

== Architecture ==
=== Exterior ===
The building is constructed of red brick with stucco ornamentation and has a slate roof. Its principal elevation is arranged around a central three-storey section of three bays, surmounted by a steep hipped roof rising to a dome. A large decorated lucarne above the second floor bears the inscription "The Kings Head". At first-floor level, three pairs of French windows open onto a verandah with an iron balustrade and ogee roof, while the ground floor incorporates a splayed bay containing the bar entrance.

On either side of the central section are two-storey ranges with mansard roofs and pointed dormer windows set behind balustrades. The outer wings are one-and-a-half storeys in height and each contain a single window. The left-hand wing has a ramped parapet pierced by a circular window, while the right-hand wing survives as a façade, with a blind first-floor window carrying the inscription "Rebuilt 1896".

=== Interior ===
The interior retains much of its late Victorian layout and decorative scheme. Tiled corridors run along either side of the building and originally provided access to a series of separate drinking compartments, all served from a large central servery with rounded ends.

At the centre of the servery is an island bar-back distinguished by its finely detailed woodwork and octagonal display feature. Other surviving features include etched glass in both external windows and internal screens, timber and plaster arches spanning the servery, decorative supporting brackets and ornamental friezes of varying designs.

Many of the original drinking areas were relatively small, particularly on the right-hand side of the building. At the rear is a large room lit by rooflights, which is thought to have originally served as a billiard room. Separating this space from the rest of the pub is an elaborate screen incorporating etched-glass panels decorated with swags, ribbons and foliage motifs.

== See also ==
- List of pubs in London
