= Mariano Bovi =

Italian engraver (1757–1813)

- Born: 8 December 1757; Naples, Kingdom of Naples
- Died: 9 April 1813 (aged 55); Messina, Italy
- Education: Francesco Bartolozzi
- Known for: Engraving

Mariano Bovi (8 December 1757 – 9 April 1813) (also Marino, Mno, M.; Bova, Bove) was an Italian engraver, publisher and art dealer.

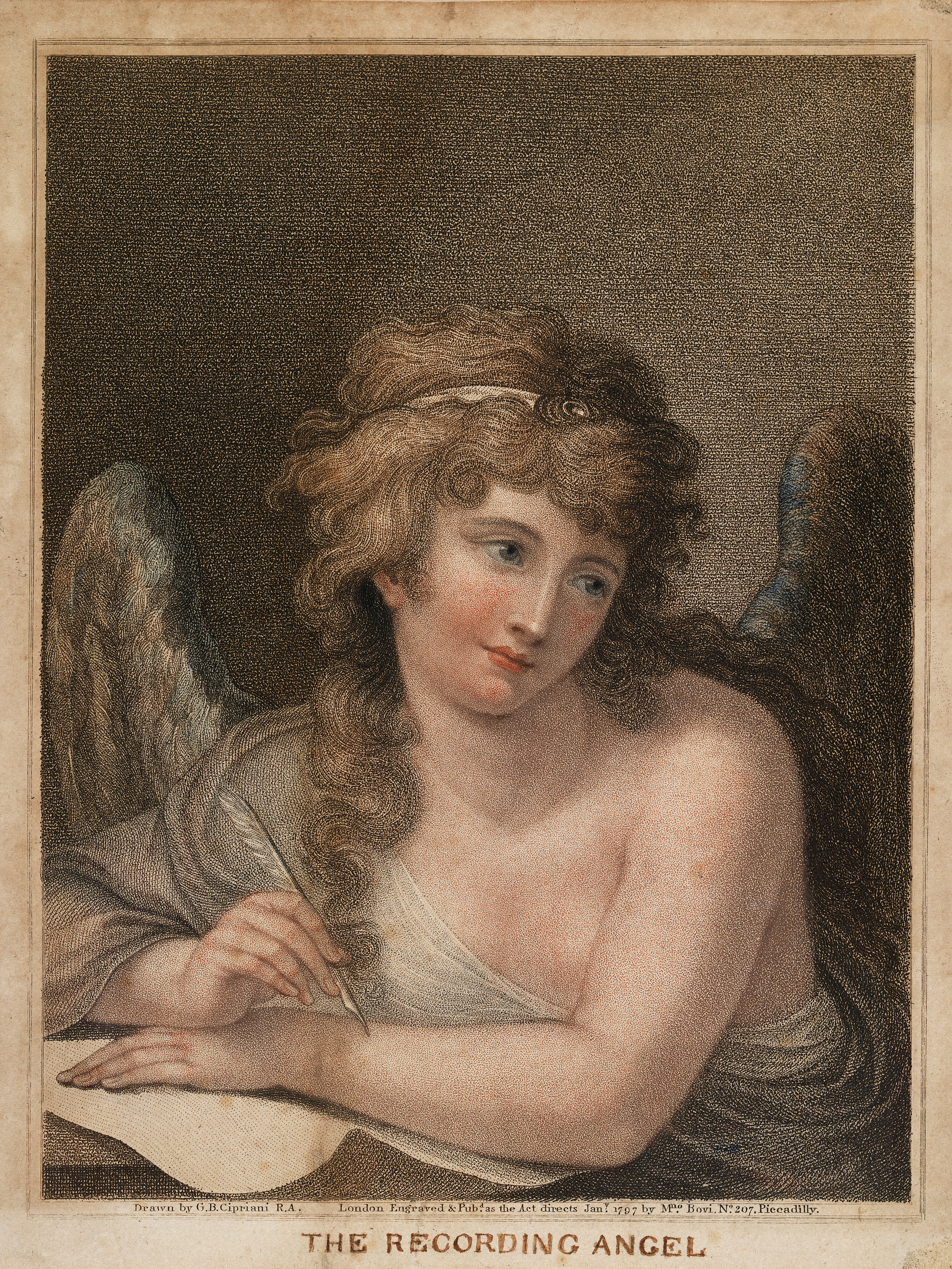
Engraving by Mariano Bovi after Giovanni Battista Cipriani

== Biography ==
Mariano Bovi was born in Naples, Italy, on 8 December 1757. There is a record of him having at least one brother, Rocco Bovi (1743-1831) (who later became a mathematician and mayor of Scilla in Calabria). In 1781 Mariano was sent to London by Ferdinand IV to serve as an apprentice for three years under Francesco Bartolozzi. He later became an art dealer and publisher, going into business with his brother Rocco. His productive period in London was between 1786 and 1791. He went into bankruptcy in 1805 and died in 1813 in Messina.

== Etchings ==
Partial list of prints by Bovi:

- Homeri Caput Integrum ..., after John Brown (published 1780)
- Miss Barker, after Richard Cosway (published c.1780-c.1813)
- Portrait of Giovanni Battista Cipriani, after Francesco Bartolozzi (published 1785)
- Bacchus's Favorite, after Lady Diana Beauclerk (published 1786)
- Henry Swinburne, after Richard Cosway (published 1786)
- Richard Cosway, after Richard Cosway (published 1786)
- Family portrait of Ferdinand IV, King of the Two Sicilies, after Angelica Kauffman (published 1790)
- Bacchante, after Lavinia Spencer, Countess Spencer (published London 1792)
- Mrs Bateman, after Ludwig Guttenbrunn (published 1793)
- The King's departure from his disconsolate family, after Domenico Pellegrini (published 1794)
- The Recording Angel, after Giovanni Battista Cipriani (published 1797)
- Alexandre Souvorov, after Josef Kreutzinger (published 1799)
- Hester Lynch Piozzi (née Salusbury, later Mrs Thrale), after Pierre Noel Violet (published 1800)
- Cupids adorning Venus with flowers, after Lady Diana Beauclerk (published 1803)
- Francesco Maurolico, after Polidoro da Caravaggio
