= Gresse Street =

Street in London

Coordinates: 51°31′2.82″N 0°7′59.35″W

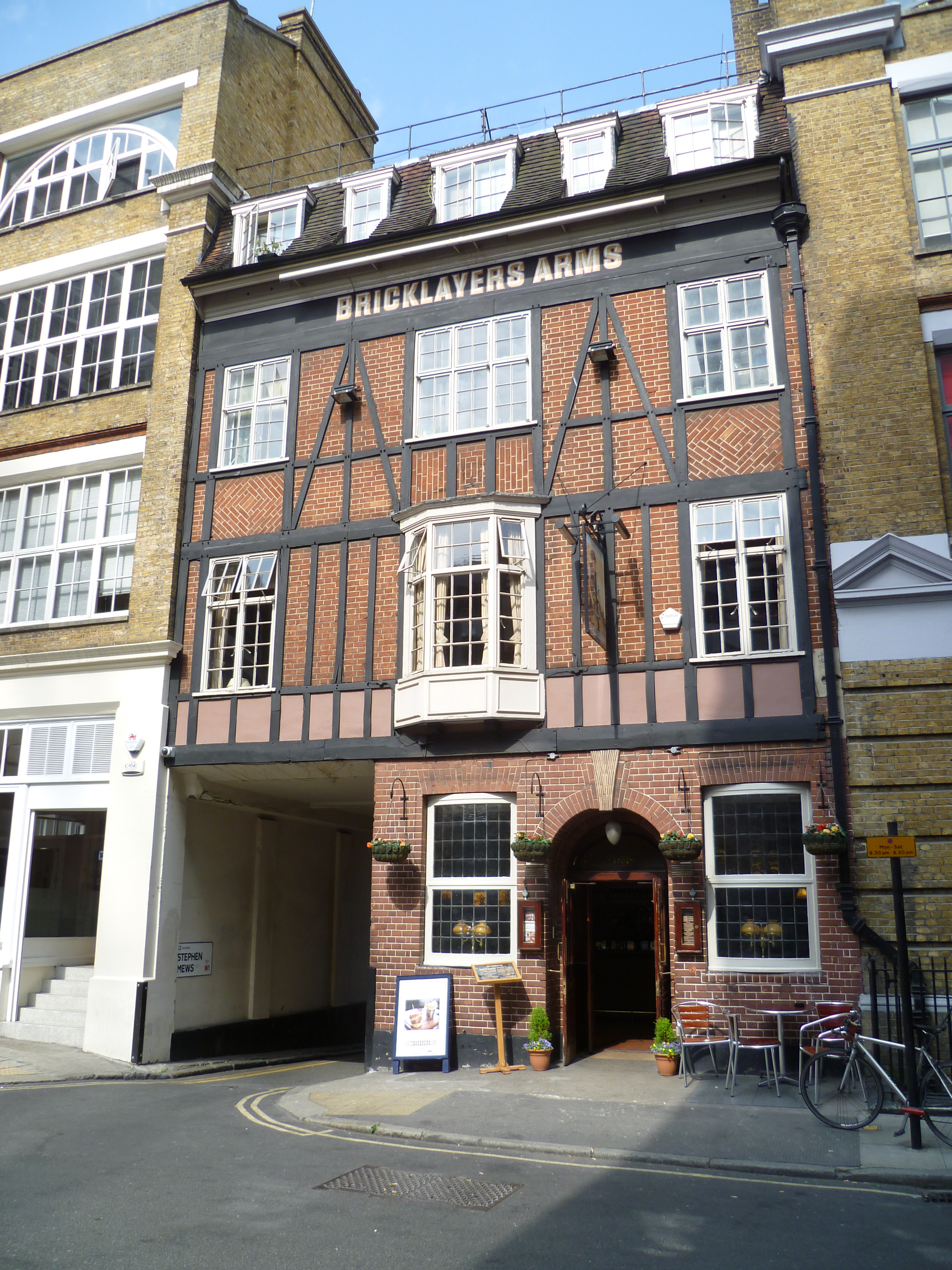
The Bricklayers Arms, Gresse Street.

Gresse Street is a street in London that is on the border between the City of Westminster and the London Borough of Camden, the north and eastern sides being in Camden and the rest in Westminster.

The street is joined by Rathbone Place, Stephen Street and Stephen Mews.

The street stands on land that was once owned by the family of the painter John Alexander Gresse.

The street is the home of the Fashion Retail Academy.
