= Pierre-Noël Violet =

Flemish-French painter (1749–1819)

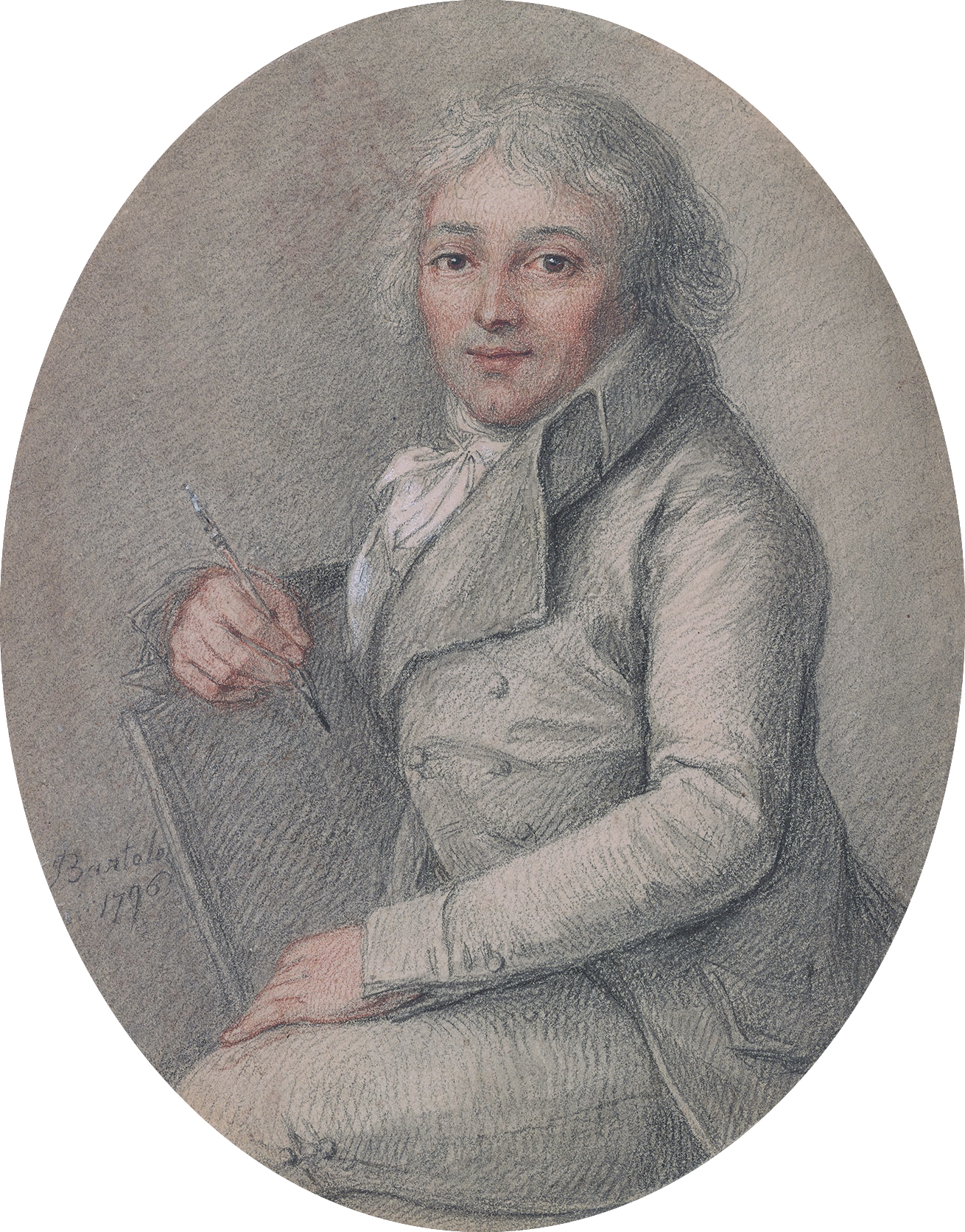
Pierre-Noël Violet, 1776 portrait by Francesco Bartolozzi

Pierre-Noël Violet (1749–1819) was a Flemish-French miniature-painter, who spent the latter part of his life in London.

== Life ==
Born in Flanders, Violet was an artist in Lille, moving to Paris in 1782. He left Paris during the French Revolution, but not before etching portraits of some of the members of the National Assembly in 1789. In that or the following year he settled in London, and in 1790 he exhibited 11 miniatures at the Royal Academy, including a portrait of Marie-Antoinette. He continued to exhibit miniatures.

Violet died in London on 9 December 1819.

== Works ==
Violet from 1798 showed drawings of domestic and fancy subjects at the Royal Academy, every year from 1798 to 1819. His portraits of Louis XVI and Marie-Antoinette, 1790, and George, Prince of Wales, 1791, and other works, were engraved by Francesco Bartolozzi. Other portraits engraved from Violet's miniatures are those Hester Piozzi by Mariano Bovi, and Gaetano Bartolozzi by Thomas Tomkins. A set of etchings of domestic subjects, worked over in stipple by Violet, was published by Moltens in 1810.

Before Violet left France, he published a treatise on miniature-painting, Traité élémentaire de l'art de peindre en miniature (1788). A supplement, containing the author's portrait, was published at Rome in 1788, and the treatise was translated into German in 1795.

== Family ==
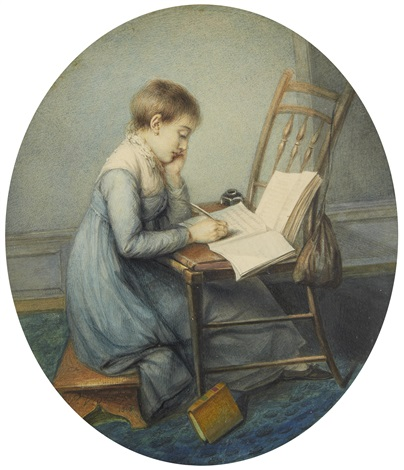
Violet's portrait of his daughter Maria

By 1771, Violet had married Marguerite Becret. They had daughters, Maria, who married James Brook Pulham, an India House clerk and artist, and exhibited at the Royal Academy; and Cecilia, who married Louis Ferrière.
