= Julian MacLaren-Ross =

British writer (1912–1964)

Julian Maclaren-Ross (7 July 1912 – 3 November 1964) was a British novelist, short-story writer, memoirist, screenwriter, and literary critic.

== Background ==
He was born James McLaren Ross in South Norwood, London, in 1912, the youngest of three children. His middle name McLaren was a tribute to the family's landlady Mrs McLaren, who had helped his mother during his birth. His mother, Gertrude, was once described as being from an Anglo-Indian family of English blood, and as "a magnificent Indian lady and the obvious source of his male beauty". His father, John Lambden Ross, came from a prosperous part-Scottish, part-Cuban family that owned a shipping company called the Thistle Line. Although this family money enabled John Lambden Ross to survive without working, it never afforded his family a high standard of living. Together with their two children, they lived in a series of rented houses and flats variously in south London, Bognor Regis, and the Southbourne district of Bournemouth. Their time in Bournemouth is described in Maclaren-Ross's memoir The Weeping and the Laughter (1953).

Lured by the lower cost of living, the family moved to the south of France in August 1921. There, Maclaren-Ross received his only formal education. At the age of 21 he drifted back to England, determined to make a career as a writer. With the help of a modest allowance from his grandfather, he initially lived in London, where he first sampled the bohemian world of Soho and Fitzrovia.

In 1936 he married a young actress and moved to rented accommodation in Bognor Regis, but the marriage did not last long. When his allowance was cut off in 1938, he earned a living as a door-to-door vacuum-cleaner salesman. He continued to write in his spare time. At that time he concentrated on writing radio plays, one of which was broadcast by the BBC.

His breakthrough came in 1940 when Horizon agreed to publish his short story "A Bit of a Smash in Madras". Shortly after its publication, he was conscripted into the army. While stationed in a series of English coastal garrisons, he produced a string of satirical short stories about the army. These appear in Horizon, Penguin New Writing, English Story and the other leading literary magazines of the period, earning him a reputation as one of the rising stars of English writing.

Maclaren-Ross deserted from the army in January 1943. Upon being gaoled, he suffered a breakdown. He was then sent to a military psychiatric hospital in the Northfield district of Birmingham. After a brief period of imprisonment, he settled in London where he soon found a job as a scriptwriter on government propaganda documentaries, working alongside poet Dylan Thomas. Meanwhile, in July 1944 Jonathan Cape published Maclaren-Ross's first book, a collection of short stories entitled The Stuff To Give The Troops. These stories prompted novelist Evelyn Waugh to declare that "Mr Maclaren-Ross's work … shows accomplishment of a rare kind."

Through the post-war 1940s, by which time he had become a ubiquitous and flamboyant presence in the pubs of Fitzrovia and Soho, he established himself as a respected literary critic, writing for The Times Literary Supplement. He published two more short-story collections, in addition to the novel Of Love and Hunger (1947), which Anthony Powell rated as highly as the work of Patrick Hamilton and F. Scott Fitzgerald. Powell was not alone in admiring Maclaren-Ross's fiction; other prominent fans included Graham Greene, Elizabeth Bowen, John Lehmann, V. S. Pritchett, Olivia Manning, and John Betjeman, the last of whom described him as 'one [of] the most gifted writers of his generation".

Maclaren-Ross's career was, however, undermined by his boozy, amphetamine-fuelled, spendthrift way of life. In search of rapid financial rewards, he devoted more and more time to journalism, screenwriting, and French-into-English translation work. The mid-1950s represented the low point of his life. Obsessed by George Orwell's glamorous widow Sonia Orwell, he ended up homeless, sleeping in the waiting-room at Euston station, on underground trains, and on friends' settees. He also had a brief spell in prison for non-payment of debts. Still, his resilience and determination enabled him to rebuild his life over the next few years.

In 1958 he married Diana Bromley, Leonard Woolf's rackety bohemian niece. She gave birth to his only child, Alex. Maclaren-Ross had by then reinvented himself as a writer of popular BBC radio drama, notably the thriller series Until the Day She Dies, which was broadcast on the Light Programme. He also began writing a series of reminiscences for London Magazine. These were conceived as part of what he called his Memoirs of the Forties. Only part of this had been completed when he suffered a fatal heart attack in November 1964 aged 52, his demise probably hastened by years of alcoholism, amphetamine-taking, and stress.

In his obituary in The Times on 6 November 1964, the paper said MacLaren-Ross "was a dedicated and highly professional writer who never quite found the right vein for his talents". It added that his short stories:

took him into the wartime literary world, where he became a conspicuous figure in Soho and Fitzrovia, blossoming out after his demobilization as a tall, slightly theatrical-looking gentleman with a silver-knobbed stick. This appearance, and the formal manners that went with it, were somewhat misleading. His stories of Soho, though aimed at a less important target than their predecessors, were still ironic, often tightly compressed and usually very funny. At the same time he was starting to work as a script-writer in films, a subject which always passionately interested him. Then he turned his attention further back: first to his unhappy prewar period as a salesman, which became the subject of his one really serious novel Of Love and Hunger (1947) then to his childhood as son of a none too prosperous Scottish father, dividing his retirement between France and a melancholy-refined English seaside. The Weeping and the Laughter, the first volume of this autobiography, appeared in 1953 and only took him up to the age of 11; unfortunately it was never followed by others, and from then on he was driven to do a great deal too much occasional work to fulfil his very real potentialities. Unfortunately for him perhaps, he was an admirable contributor of occasional articles and parodies to Punch and a valued reviewer for The Times Literary Supplement, The Sunday Times, and, more recently, The London Magazine. He also did occasional film work and at least two thriller-serials for the Light Programme of the B.B.C. But in spite of his interest in, and encyclopaedic knowledge of, the thriller form in both novel and film his own incursions into the medium were never really successful, either in the artistic or in the commercial sense. His reviews made more demands on him; at least they showed his very wide literary knowledge and interests, which included much that was relentlessly highbrow in both French and English. It was only quite lately that his publisher managed to induce him to embark on Memoirs of the Forties, of which an admirably promising instalment appeared in The London Magazine for November. It was about half finished at the time of his death. For his best and profoundest book was Of Love and Hunger, which was recently republished as a paperback. It is a short, tragic work somewhat in the vein of Patrick Hamilton, but deserves to live in its own right. The army stories were collected in The Stuff to Give the Troops (1944): they are minor historic documents as well as very funny stories. Apart from the autobiography none of his seven other books comes up to this level, but anything he wrote has a certain distinction. His manuscripts were unforgettable, tiny neat writing with a slight slope and the odd baroque decoration, written perhaps in the Mandrake Club or in a pub. Ironic, self-controlled, slightly stilted, yet giving nothing away, they were very like the man himself.

In the wake of Maclaren-Ross's death, his uncompleted Memoirs of the Forties was published by Alan Ross under the London Magazine Editions banner. The book was a critical and commercial success. The reviewer for The Times stated, "He wrote with economy and a formal elegance that marvellously suited his detached attitude to whatever in his surroundings seemed odd, ridiculous or wild; down it all went in curt graphic dialogue and deadpan description. There is nothing else that so conveys the atmosphere of bohemian and fringe-literary London under the impact of war and its immediate hangover. The book is comic, nostalgic and at times even moving, all without the least sense of strain."

Over subsequent years he went on to enjoy a strange, posthumous career as the model for characters in other people's books. The best-known of these are the bohemian novelist X. Trapnel in Anthony Powell's A Dance to the Music of Time (v.10 Books Do Furnish a Room) and as Prince Yakimov in Olivia Manning's The Balkan Trilogy.

Prompted by the publication of Fear and Loathing in Fitzrovia, Paul Willetts's much-praised biography, all of his finest work came back into print, attracting praise from the likes of D. J. Taylor, Lucian Freud, Philip French, Virginia Ironside, Sarah Waters, and Harold Pinter, who dramatised a couple of his short stories for BBC radio. "It was a great treat to discover the writing of Julian Maclaren-Ross. Witty, smart, eccentric—he never ceases to entertain", wrote Sarah Waters. With comparable enthusiasm, critic and novelist D. J. Taylor hailed Maclaren-Ross as "one of the great unsung heroes of the literary 1940s and at his best a figure to rank with Orwell, Connolly and Waugh".

== Works ==
- The Stuff to Give the Troops, Jonathan Cape (1944)
- Better than a Kick in the Pants, Lawson & Dunn, jointly with Hyperion Press (1945)
- Bitten by the Tarantula, Allan Wingate (1946)
- The Nine Men of Soho, Allan Wingate (1946)
- Of Love and Hunger, Allan Wingate (1947)
- The Weeping and the Laughter, Rupert Hart-Davis (1953)
- The Funny Bone, Elek Books (1956)
- Until the Day She Dies, Hamish Hamilton (1960)
- The Doomsday Book, Hamish Hamilton (1961)
- My Name is Love, Times Press (1964)
- Memoirs of the Forties, Alan Ross (1965)
- Collected Memoirs, Black Spring Press (2004)
- Julian Maclaren-Ross: Selected Stories, Dewi Lewis (2004)
- Bitten by the Tarantula and other writing, Black Spring Press (2005)
- Selected Letters, Black Spring Press (2008)
