= Rathbone Place =

Street in London

Coordinates: 51.517501°N 0.133805°W

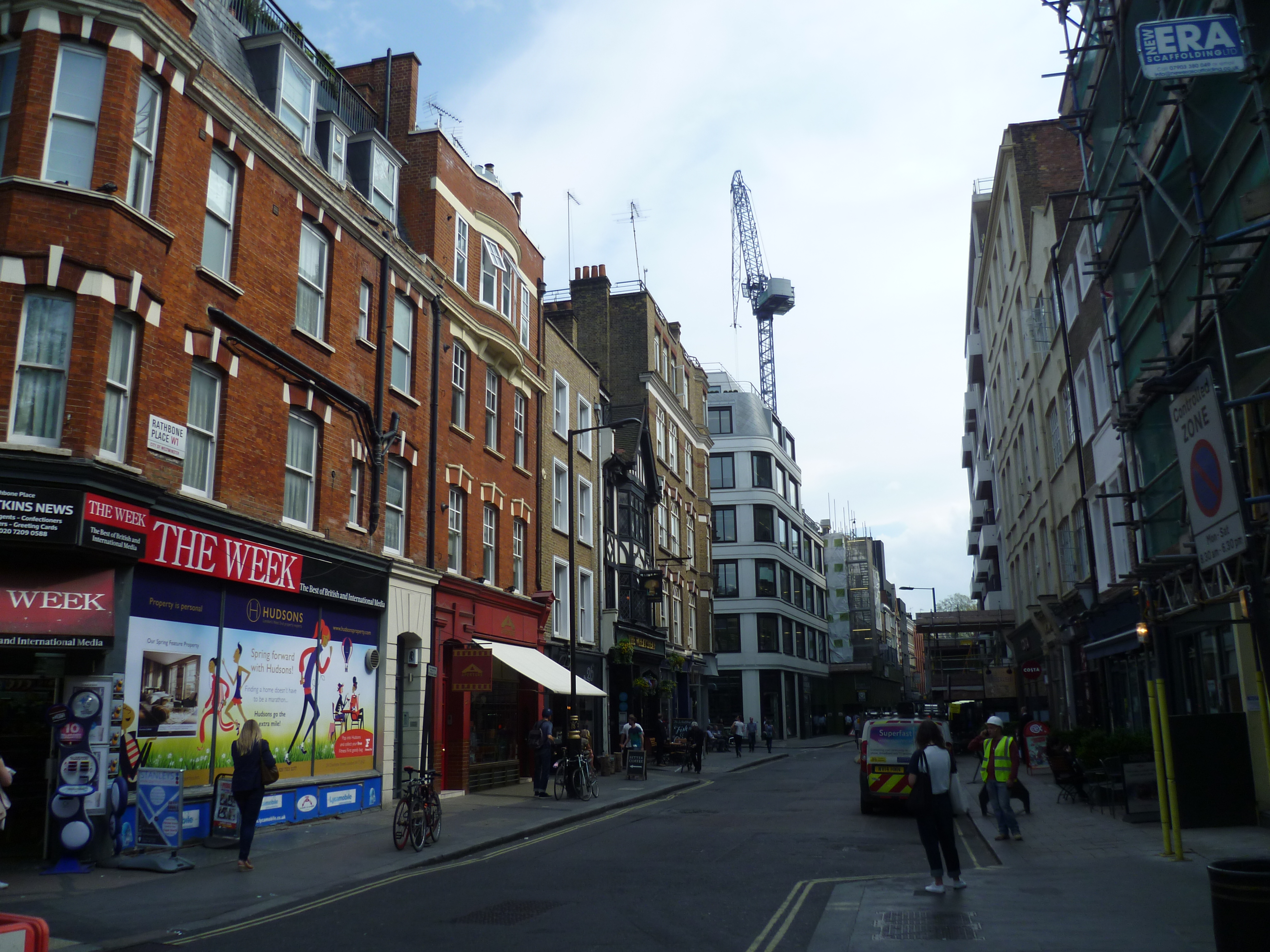
Rathbone Place looking south

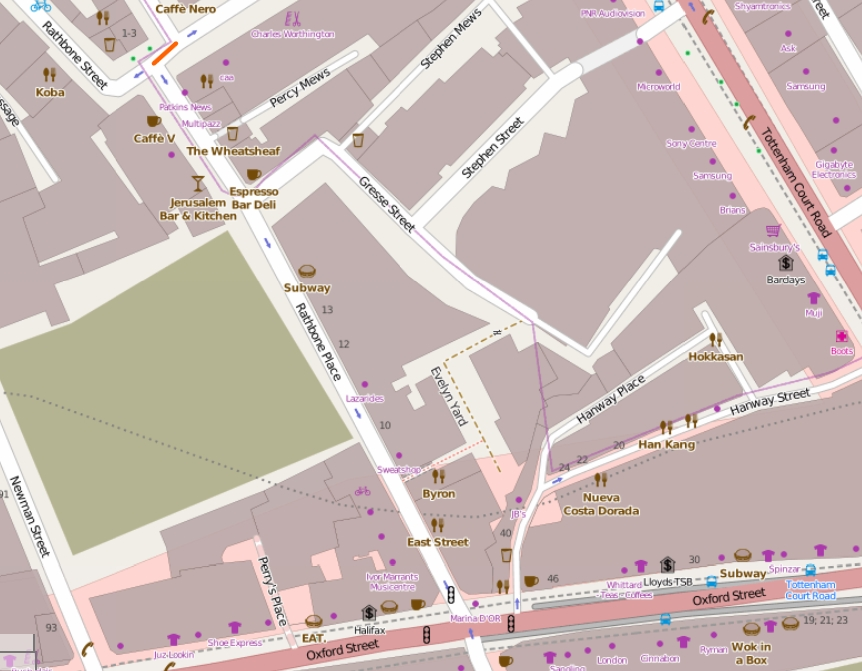
The immediate vicinity of Rathbone Place

Rathbone Place is a street in central London that runs roughly north-west from Oxford Street to Percy Street. it is joined on its eastern side by Percy Mews, Gresse Street, and Evelyn Yard. The street is mainly occupied by retail and office premises.

== History ==
The street was originally known as Glanville Street. It was renamed after Captain Thomas Rathbone, who had owned a house on the street since 1684.

== Inhabitants ==
The essayist and critic William Hazlitt lived at No. 12 from 1802 to 1805, while the painter John Constable lived at No. 50 during this time. The sculptor Gilbert Bayes lived at No. 52 from 1899 to 1900. The wax modeller Emma Peachey lived and had showrooms at No. 35 in the mid-19th century.

Winsor & Newton, makers of artist's supplies, was founded in 1832 at 38 Rathbone Place.

The music-hall publisher Henri D'Alcorn was based in Rathbone Place: at no. 22A in 1855–7, no. 18 in 1857–60 and no. 8 in 1860–67.

== Buildings ==
On the east side, Number 11 was a grade II listed terraced house, built around 1718–20 and refronted in the nineteenth century. The ground floor was converted to commercial premises. It is now the home of Lazarides Gallery.

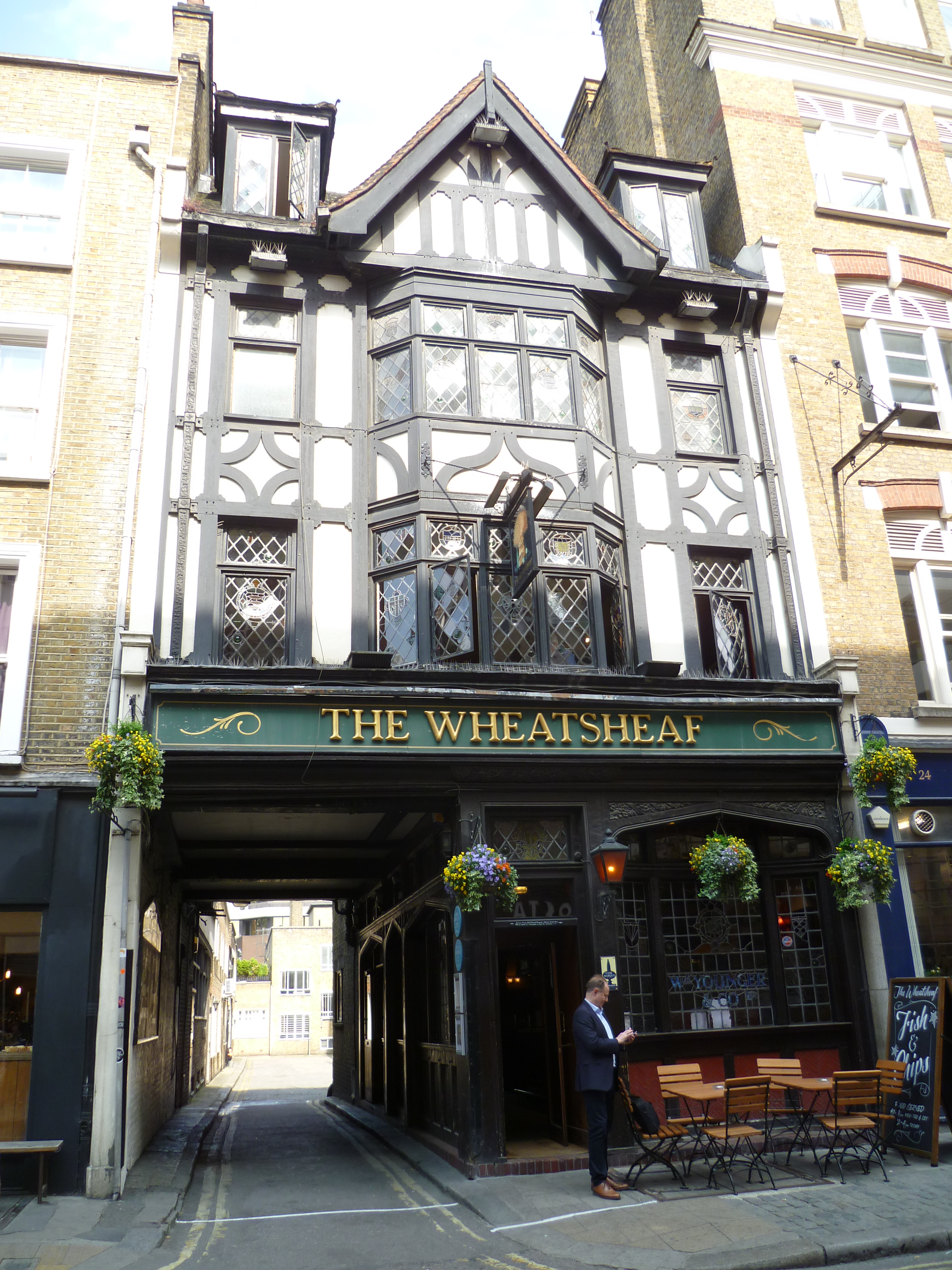
The Wheatsheaf public house

On the same side is The Wheatsheaf public house at number 25 which became one of the principal gathering-places of London's bohemian set before the Second World War and where customers included Dylan Thomas.

On the western side of the street was the former Royal Mail depot, which is now One Rathbone Square; it was redeveloped by Great Portland Estates into a mix of residential, office and retail units.

A sign on a building for Rathbone Place is seen in the last scene of BBC's Sherlock series 4 finale. This is a nod to the actor Basil Rathbone and the building shown is not part of Rathbone Place.
