= Hamilton baronets of Silvertonhill (1646) =

Escutcheon of the Hamilton baronets of Silvertonhill

The Hamilton baronetcy, of Silvertonhill in the County of Lanark, was created in the Baronetage of Nova Scotia in 1646 (or in 1642, according to Cokayne, see note) for Robert Hamilton, a Royalist and favourite of Charles I. He was a descendant of Alexander Hamilton of Silvertonhill, brother of James Hamilton, 1st Lord Hamilton (ancestor of the Dukes of Hamilton and the Dukes of Abercorn).

== Hamilton baronets, of Silvertonhill (1646) ==
- Sir Robert Hamilton, 1st Baronet (died c. 1670), MP for Lanarkshire (1661–1663).
- Col. Sir Robert Hamilton, 2nd Baronet (died 1708), MP for Lanarkshire (1678), served in the Earl of Leven's Regiment.
- Sir John Hamilton, 3rd Baronet (died 1748)
- Lt-Gen. Sir Robert Hamilton, 4th Baronet (died 1786), colonel of the 108th Regiment in 1762, and from 1770 colonel of the 40th Regiment
- Sir Frederic Hamilton, 5th Baronet (1777–1853), who succeeded to the baronetcy directly from his grandfather (his father, John William Hamilton, having predeceased his own father in 1781). According to his father's memorial stone in Chester Cathedral, his father John had been Secretary of the War Department in the Kingdom of Ireland's government, and Frederic was one of eight legitimate children he had with his wife Mary-Anne.
- Sir Robert North Collie Hamilton, 6th Baronet KCB (1802–1887)
- Capt. Sir Frederic Harding Anson Hamilton, 7th Baronet (1836–1919), who served as a Major in the 60th Rifles and succeeded his father in 1887. On 28 September 1865 at St. George's Church, Montreal he married Mary Jane, daughter of Thomas W. Willan, a barrister of Lincoln's Inn and Clerk of the Crown at Quebec, and his wife Julia, fourth daughter of Hon. Louis Gugy, MLC. The couple had two sons and four daughters.
- Maj. Sir Robert Caradoc Hamilton, 8th Baronet (1877–1959)
- Sir (Robert Charles) Richard Caradoc Hamilton, 9th Baronet (1911–2001)
- Sir Andrew Caradoc Hamilton, 10th Baronet (born 1953)

The heir presumptive to the baronetcy is Paul Howden Hamilton (born 1951). He is descended from the younger son of the 7th Baronet.
