= Charles Canning, 1st Earl Canning =

English statesman and Governor-General of India

His Excellency The Right Honourable The Earl Canning KG GCB KCSI PC
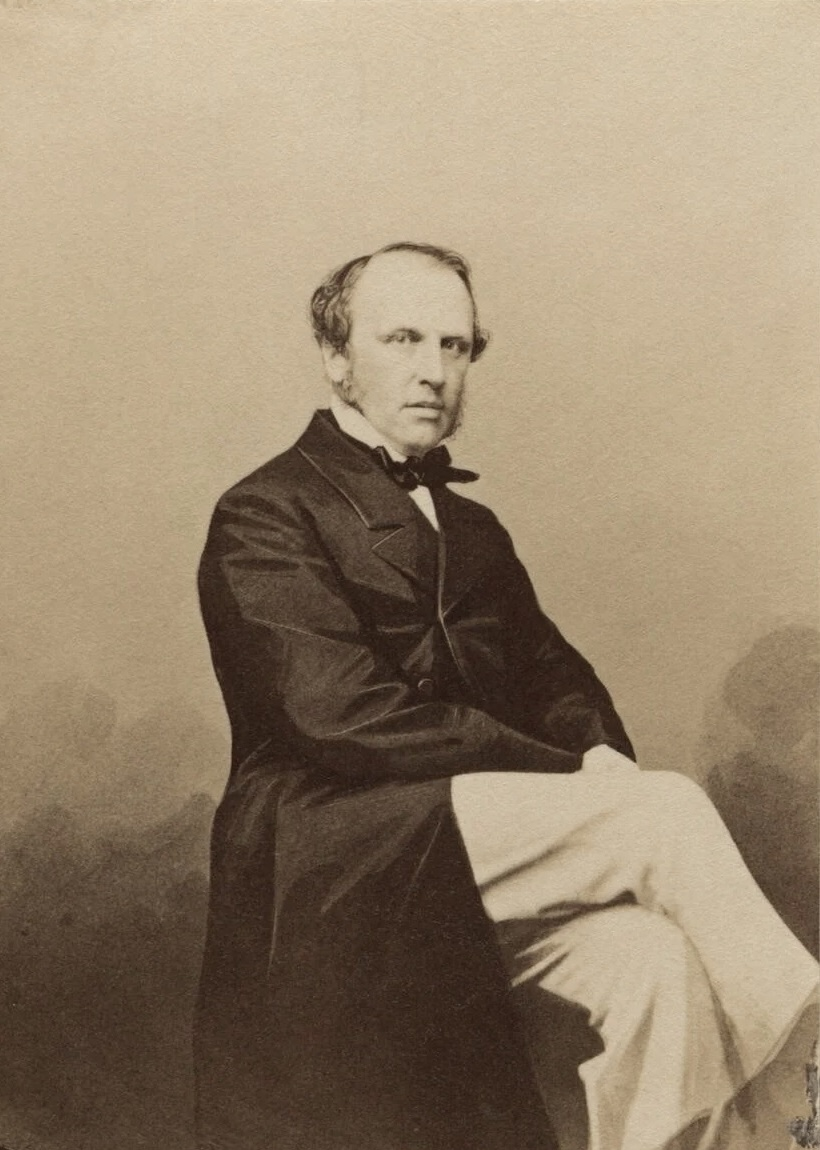
- Portrait by John Jabez Edwin Mayall, c. 1855

Governor-General of India
- In office 28 February 1856 – 31 October 1858
- Monarch: Victoria
- Preceded by: The Marquess of Dalhousie

Viceroy and Governor-General of India
- In office 1 November 1858 – 21 March 1862
- Monarch: Victoria
- Prime Minister: The Viscount Palmerston; The Earl of Derby
- Preceded by: Position established
- Succeeded by: The Earl of Elgin

First Commissioner of Woods and Forests
- In office 2 March 1846 – 30 June 1846
- Monarch: Victoria
- Prime Minister: Sir Robert Peel, Bt
- Preceded by: The Earl of Lincoln
- Succeeded by: Viscount Morpeth

Postmaster General
- In office 5 January 1853 – 30 January 1855
- Monarch: Victoria
- Prime Minister: The Earl of Aberdeen
- Preceded by: The Earl of Hardwicke
- Succeeded by: The Duke of Argyll

Personal details
- Born: 14 December 1812 Brompton, London
- Died: 17 June 1862 (aged 49) Grosvenor Square, London
- Party: Conservative; Peelite
- Spouse: Hon. Charlotte Stuart (m. 1835; died 1861)
- Parent(s): George Canning; Joan Canning, 1st Viscountess Canning
- Education: Christ Church, Oxford

Charles John Canning, 1st Earl Canning (14 December 1812 – 17 June 1862), also styled Viscount Canning and referred to as "Clemency Canning", was a British politician and Governor-General of India during the Indian Rebellion of 1857. He was the first Viceroy of India after the transfer of power from the East India Company to the Crown of Queen Victoria in 1858 after the rebellion was crushed.

Canning is credited for ensuring that the administration and most departments of the government functioned normally during the rebellion and took major administrative decisions even during the peak of the Rebellion in 1857, including establishing the first three modern Universities in India, the University of Calcutta, University of Madras and University of Bombay based on Wood's despatch. Canning passed the Hindu Widows' Remarriage Act, 1856 which was drafted by his predecessor Lord Dalhousie before the rebellion. He also passed the General Service Enlistment Act of 1856.

After the rebellion he presided over a smooth transfer and reorganisation of government from the East India company to the crown, the Indian Penal Code was drafted in 1860 based on the code drafted by Macaulay and came into force in 1862. Canning met the rebellion '"with firmness, confidence, magnanimity and calm" as per his biographer, Sir George Dunbar. Canning was very firm during the rebellion but after that he focused on reconciliation and reconstruction rather than retribution and issued a clemency proclamation.

== Background ==
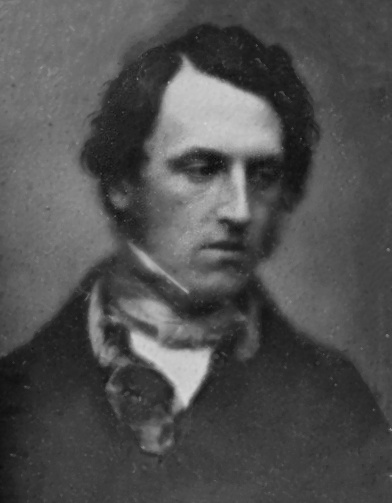
Daguerreotype, c. 1845

Born at Gloucester Lodge, Brompton, near London, Canning was the youngest child of George and Joan Canning. His mother was the daughter of Major-General John Scott. Meanwhile, his father was a Tory Member of Parliament who had been a member of the ministries of William Pitt the Younger and the Duke of Portland (most notably having been Foreign Secretary from 1807 to 1809), but as of Charles's birth was out of government due to personal and policy differences with several leading figures. Over Charles's youth, his father returned to government and held several senior posts, including a second stint as Foreign Secretary 1822-27 and Prime Minister for a few months before his untimely death from illness in 1827. His mother was granted a viscountcy in her own right, becoming the 1st Viscountess Canning, largely in tribute to her late husband.

Charles Canning was educated at Christ Church, Oxford, where he graduated B.A. in 1833, as first class in classics and second class in mathematics.

== Political career ==
In 1836 he entered Parliament, being returned as member for the town of Warwick in the Conservative interest. He did not, however, sit long in the House of Commons; for, on the death of his mother in 1837, he succeeded to the peerage and entered the House of Lords. His first official appointment was that of Parliamentary Under-Secretary of State for Foreign Affairs, in the administration formed by Sir Robert Peel in 1841, his chief being the Earl of Aberdeen. This post he held till January 1846; and from January to July of that year, when the Peel administration was broken up, Lord Canning filled the post of First Commissioner of Woods and Forests.

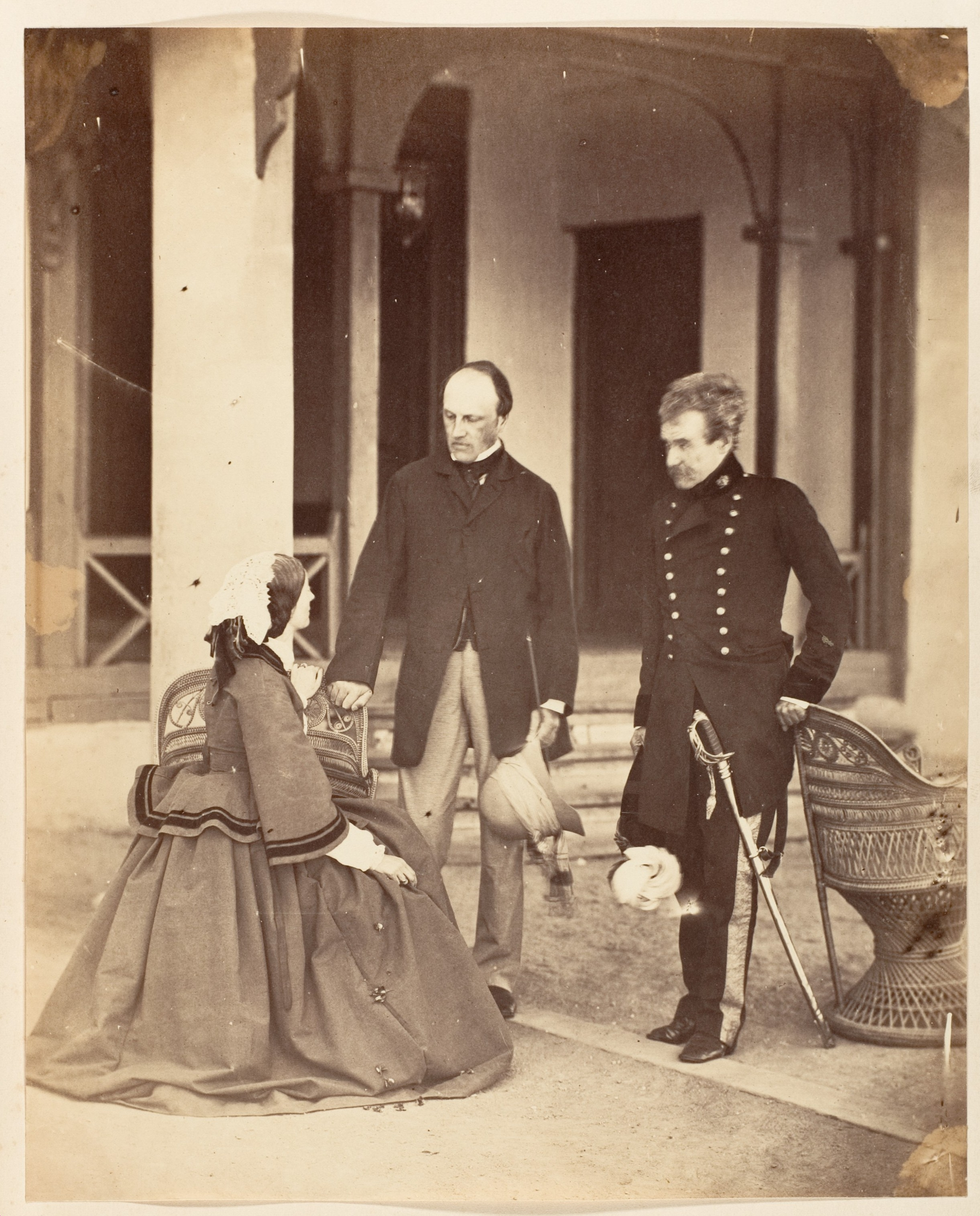
At Simla with his wife and Lord Clyde, Commander-in-Chief, 1860

He served on the Royal Commission on the British Museum (1847–49). He declined to accept office under the Earl of Derby; but on the formation of the coalition ministry under the Earl of Aberdeen in January 1853, he received the appointment of Postmaster General. In this office, he showed not only a large capacity for hard work but also general administrative ability and much zeal for the improvement of the service. He retained his post under Lord Palmerston's ministry until July 1855, when, in consequence of the departure of Lord Dalhousie and a vacancy in the governor-generalship of India, he was selected by Lord Palmerston to succeed to that great position. This appointment appears to have been made rather on the ground of his father's great services than from any proof as yet given of special personal fitness on the part of Lord Canning. The new governor sailed from England in December 1855 and entered upon the duties of his office in India at the close of February 1856.

According to the Encyclopædia Britannica of 1911, "In the year following his accession to office, the deep-seated discontent of the people broke out in the Indian Rebellion of 1857. Fears were entertained, and even the friends of the Governor-General to some extent shared them, that he was not equal to the crisis. But the fears proved groundless. He had a clear eye for the gravity of the situation, a calm judgment, and a prompt, swift hand to do what was really necessary. ... He carried the Indian empire safely through the stress of the storm, and, what was perhaps a harder task still, he dealt wisely with the enormous difficulties arising at the close of such a war. ... The name of Clemency Canning, which was applied to him during the heated animosities of the moment, has since become a title of honour." He was derisively called "Clemency" on account of a Resolution dated 31 July 1857, which distinguished between sepoys from regiments which had mutinied and killed their officers and European civilians, and those Indian soldiers who had disbanded and dispersed to their villages, without being involved in violence. While subsequently regarded as a humane and sensible measure, the Resolution made Canning unpopular at a time when British popular opinion favoured collective and indiscriminate reprisals.

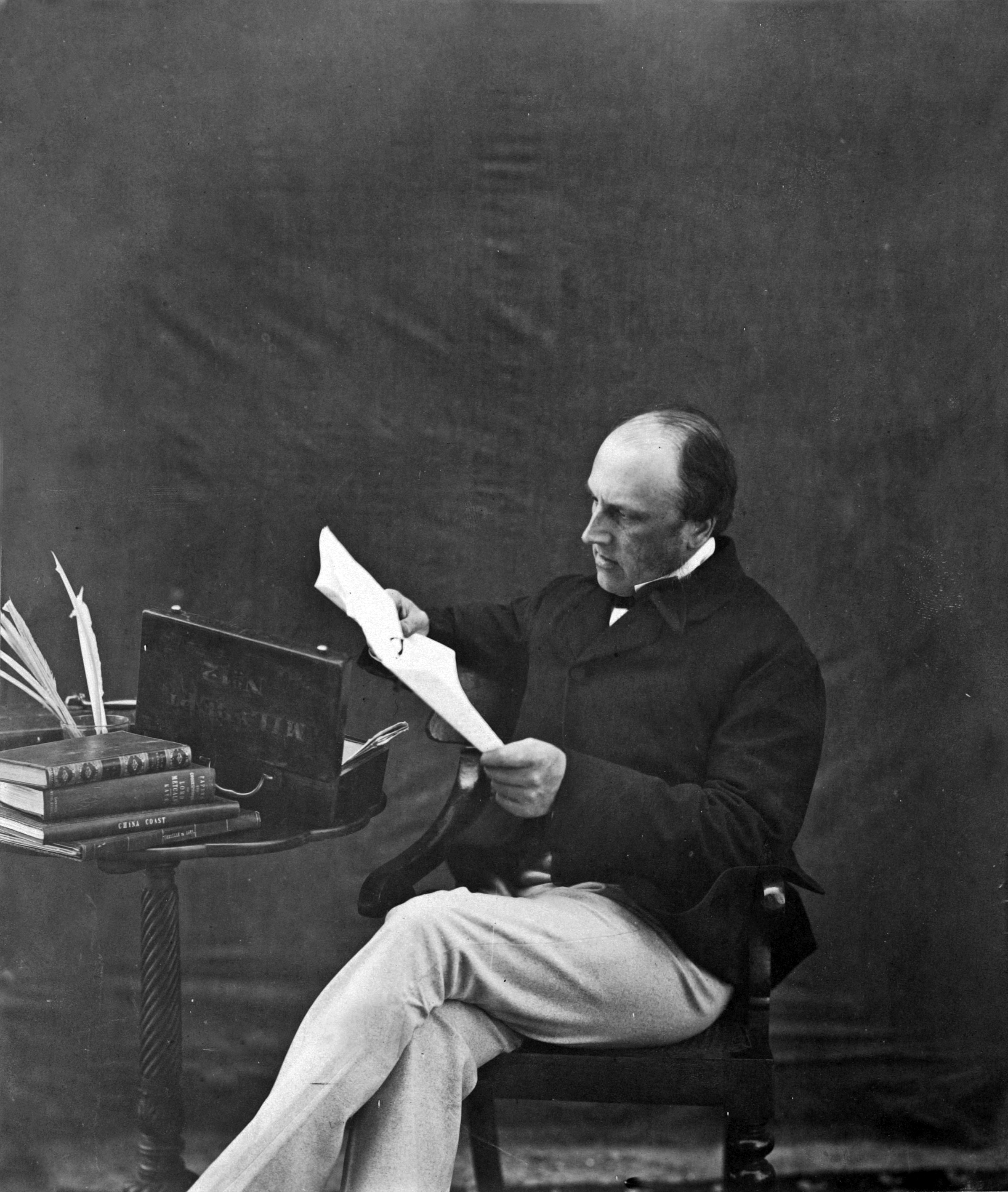
India, 1860

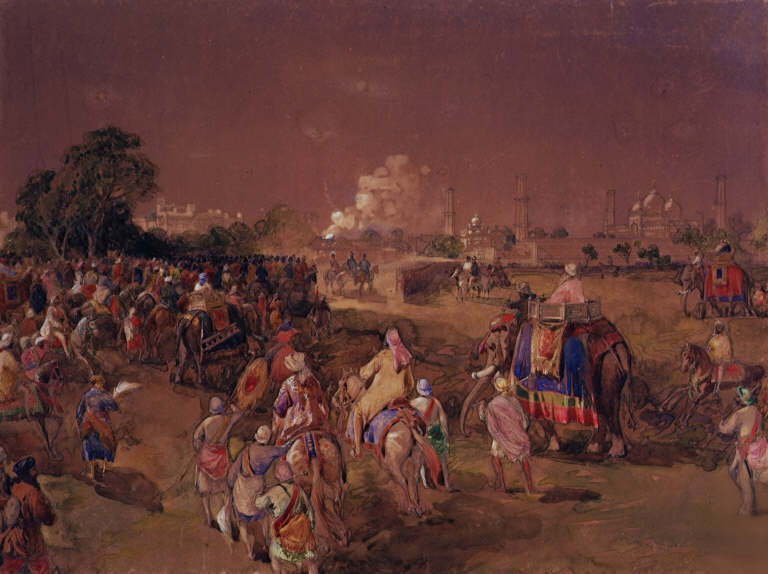
The arrival of Lord Canning at Lahore

The Encyclopædia Britannica of 1911 continues, "While rebellion was raging in Oudh he issued a proclamation declaring the lands of the province forfeited, and this step gave rise to much angry controversy. A secret despatch, couched in arrogant and offensive terms, was addressed to Canning by Lord Ellenborough, then a member of the Derby administration, which would have justified the Governor-General in immediately resigning. But from a strong sense of duty, he continued at his post, and ere long the general condemnation of the despatch was so strong that the writer felt it necessary to retire from office. Lord Canning replied to the despatch, calmly and in a statesman-like manner explaining and vindicating his censured policy" and in 1858 he was rewarded by being made the first Viceroy of India.

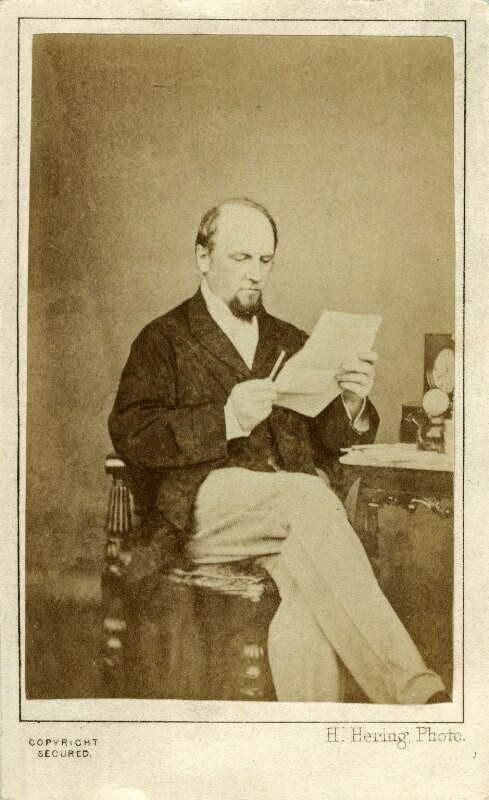
Charles Canning by H. Hering

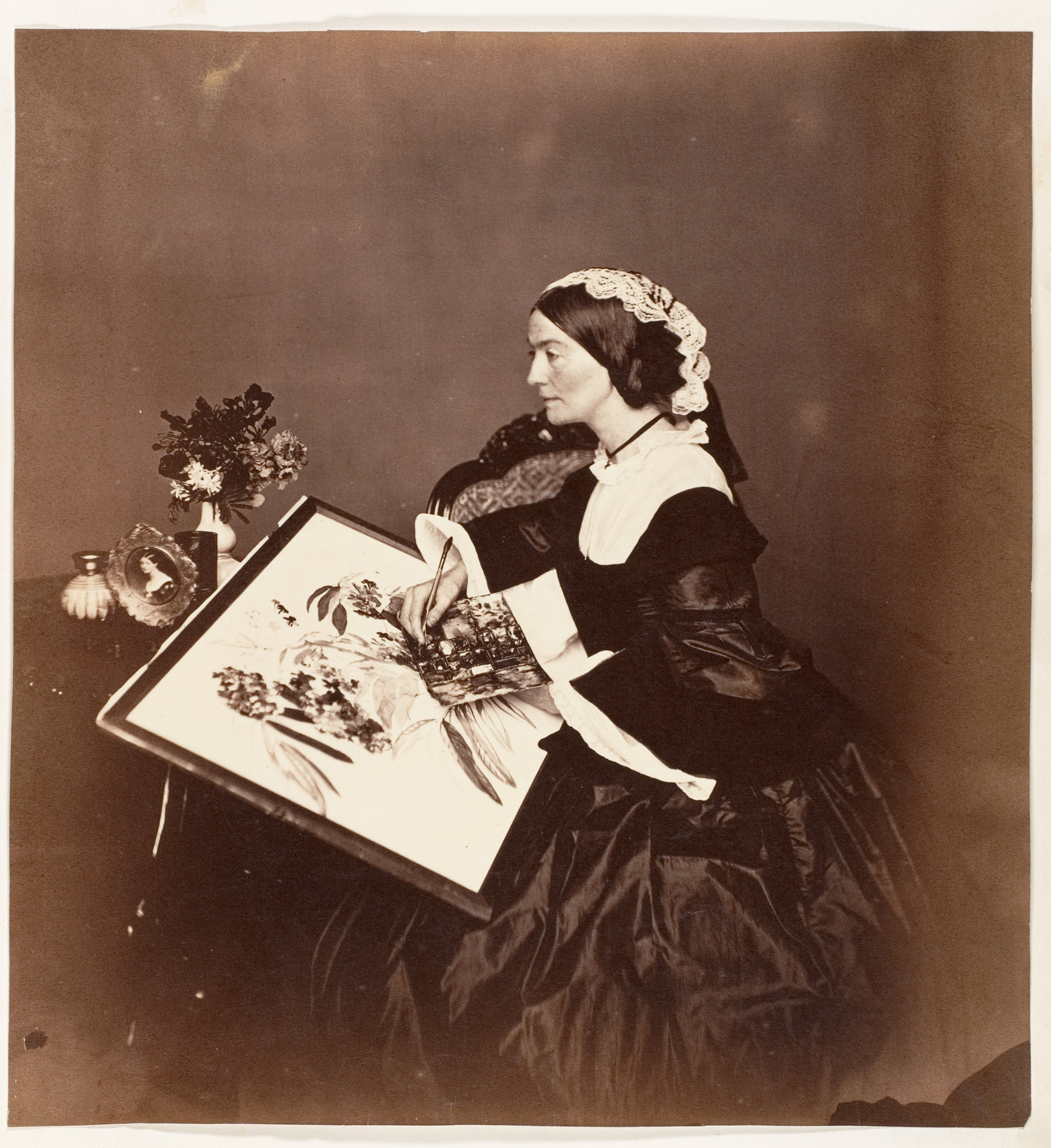
Charlotte Canning, painting in Calcutta, 1861, by H Hering

The Encyclopædia Britannica of 1911 adds, "In April 1859 he received the thanks of both Houses of Parliament for his great services during the rebellion. He was also made an extra civil grand cross of the Order of the Bath, and in May of the same year he was raised to the dignity of an Earl, as Earl Canning. ...By the strain of anxiety and hard work his health and strength were seriously impaired, while the death of his wife was also a great shock to him; in the hope that rest in his native land might restore him, he left India, reaching England in April 1862. But it was too late. He died in London on 17 June. About a month before his death he was created a Knight of the Garter. As he died without issue the titles became extinct."

Prior to the rebellion, Canning and his wife, Charlotte, had desired to produce a photographic survey of Indian people, primarily for their own edification. This project was transformed into an official government study as a consequence of the rebellion, after which it was seen as useful documentation in the effort to learn more about native communities and thereby better understand them. It was eventually published as an eight-volume work, The People of India, between 1868 and 1875.

== Places named after Canning ==
- Canning Road in Croydon, London.
- Canning Town in London
- Fort Canning Hill, a hill in Singapore, is named after Viscount Charles Canning, although many people mistakenly believe that it is named after his father, George Canning,
- Canning Street [ Kolkata]
- Canning Street in Kemptown, Brighton is named after Viscount Canning
- Cannington, a neighbourhood in Prayagraj (Allahabad), Uttar Pradesh, India, now known as Civil Lines
- Canning, South 24 Parganas in West Bengal, India
- University of Lucknow, India, was formerly named Canning College
- Canning Street in Melbourne, Australia
- Rua Canning in Ipanema, Rio de Janeiro, Brazil
- Canning Road, Rawalpindi, Pakistan

== See also ==
- Charlotte Canning, Countess Canning
- Canning in West Bengal

Parliament of the United Kingdom
Preceded by Edward Bolton King; Sir Charles Greville	Member of Parliament for Warwick; 1836–1837; With: Edward Bolton King	Succeeded by Edward Bolton King; William Collins
Political offices
Preceded by Viscount Leveson	Parliamentary Under-Secretary of State for Foreign Affairs; 1841–1846	Succeeded by George Smythe
Preceded by Earl of Lincoln	First Commissioner of Woods and Forests; 1846	Succeeded by Viscount Morpeth
Preceded by The Earl of Hardwicke	Postmaster General; 1853–1855	Succeeded by The Duke of Argyll
Government offices
Preceded by The Earl of Dalhousie	Governor-General of India; 1856–1862	Succeeded by The Earl of Elgin
New creation	Viceroy of India; 1858–1862	Succeeded by The Earl of Elgin
Peerage of the United Kingdom
New creation	Earl Canning; 1859–1862	Extinct
Preceded by Joan Canning	Viscount Canning; 1837–1862	Extinct
