= Meerut mutiny =

First armed resistance during the Indian Rebellion of 1857 at Meerut

- Part of the Indian Rebellion of 1857
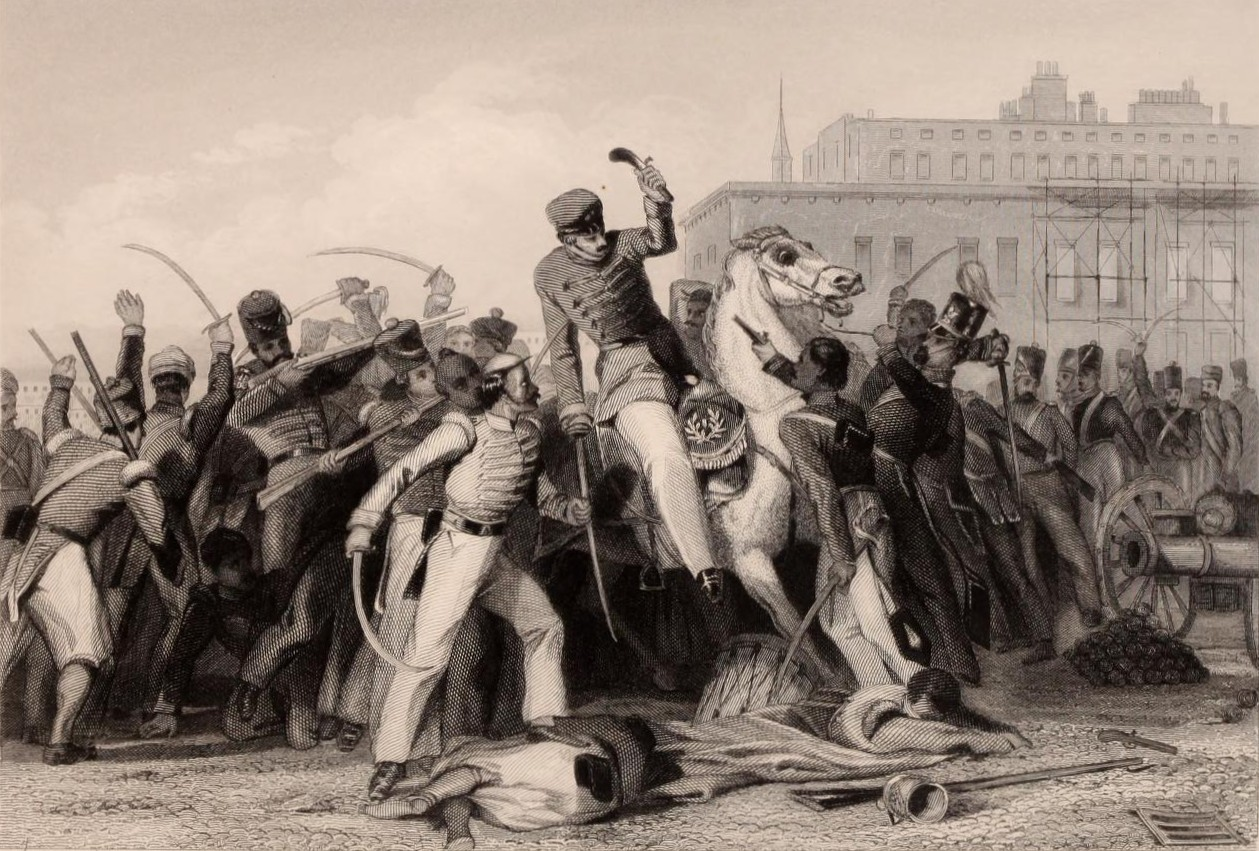
- Death of Colonel Finnis in Meerut (published in 1858)
| Date | 10 and 11 May 1857 |
| Location | Meerut, India |
| Result | Mutineers victory |

Belligerents
| (United Kingdom) British Empire; East India Company | Rebel Company sepoys |

Commanders and leaders
| (United Kingdom) W. H. Hewitt | ? |

The Meerut mutiny was a military mutiny on 10 and 11 May 1857 in the city of Meerut in British-controlled India, the first significant armed action against British military authority which accelerated an outbreak of the Indian rebellion of 1857 and 1858. Most of the Indian native soldiers of whole city garrison, outraged by a severe punishment of their 85 other comrades, raised their weapons against the local British forces and eventually civilians in the city. The event sparked an intense impulse to the other Indian soldiers in British ranks and following rebellion spread to various regions of British-ruled India.

== Prelude ==
In 1857 tensions between the sepoys, native Indian soldiers, and British colonial authority started to rise. Long-standing issues because of accepting men of different castes, service changes of 1856 General Service Enlistment Act, allowing to send sepoys out of the continent for their service, both of that contributed to unrest among sepoy troops. As a serious problem also appeared to be putting the new Enfield Pattern 1853 rifled musket in service in India. Used paper cartridges serving as ammunition were imported pre-greased. While Muslim soldiers believed the paper was greased with pig fat and Hindus thought it was greased with cow one, opening the cartridge during rifle loading by tear-off the top with their teeth would mean to break their religion rules, as Muslims are not allowed to consume pork just as Hindus cannot consume beef. Some sepoys saw it as a direct attempt to dispute Muslim and Hindi traditions.

Due to those circumstances in British colonial forces, on 29 March 1857 sepoy Mangal Pandey of Barrackpore garrison, Bengal, shot at two of his commanding officers, missed, then attempted suicide, failed and was later executed. By April, news about Pandey's deed had spread across North India and reached Meerut, which was then the second-largest East India Company garrison, counting 2,357 Indian sepoys and 2,038 British soldiers stationed there along with 12 British-manned guns. Several hundreds of British civilians were also present living in a separate cantonment, mostly relatives of European-British soldiers.

== Mutiny ==
On 24 April 1857, Meerut's commander, Colonel Carmichael Smyth, paraded 90 Indian sepoys of the 3rd Light Bengal Cavalry Regiment, most of whom of Uttar Pradesh and Bihar descent. Smyth ordered the soldiers to fire the new Enfield cartridges they had been supplied with. Eighty-five soldiers (of total number of 90) refused to touch them when ordered to, which led to their direct imprisonment.

On 9 May the entire garrison of about 4,000 men, both British and Indian, was summoned to the general exercise ground at Meerut Fort to witness the execution of the guilty. The condemned sepoys were lined up on one side of the square; dressed in their red and white uniforms, but barefoot and without weapons. The other Indian regiments carried unloaded rifles. The British regiments were armed with the new Enfield rifles, loaded with the controversial cartridges, and were ordered to point with those weapons on the mutineers, same as the dragoons with sabres. A British officer then stepped forward and read out the sentence against the condemned soldiers, while his words, translated into Hindustani by an Indian officer: most of them were sentenced to 10 years' imprisonment with hard labour, eleven comparatively young soldiers were given five years' imprisonment. After the sentence had been read out, a group of British soldiers walked in front of the line of condemned soldiers and tore the buttons from their uniforms and the coats from their backs and their feet were then chained. The condemned soldiers then raised their arms in appeal to the general. When they were ignored, they turned to the other Indian soldiers and reproached them for not intervening when they saw them being humiliated. The atmosphere was described as very tense. The condemned soldiers were then escorted away.

In the evening some of the Indian soldiers present on the parade during the day were taunted by local prostitutes who refused them their services, which reportedly became another provoking factor for Indians to take revenge on the Europeans. In the city posters were seen calling for rebellion against the British. That same evening, British officer Hugh Gough was warned that sepoys in Meerut were planning the mutiny and massacre the British soldiers and their families. Although Gough immediately reported this matter to his commander George Carmichael-Smyth, no provisions were done.

== 11 May ==
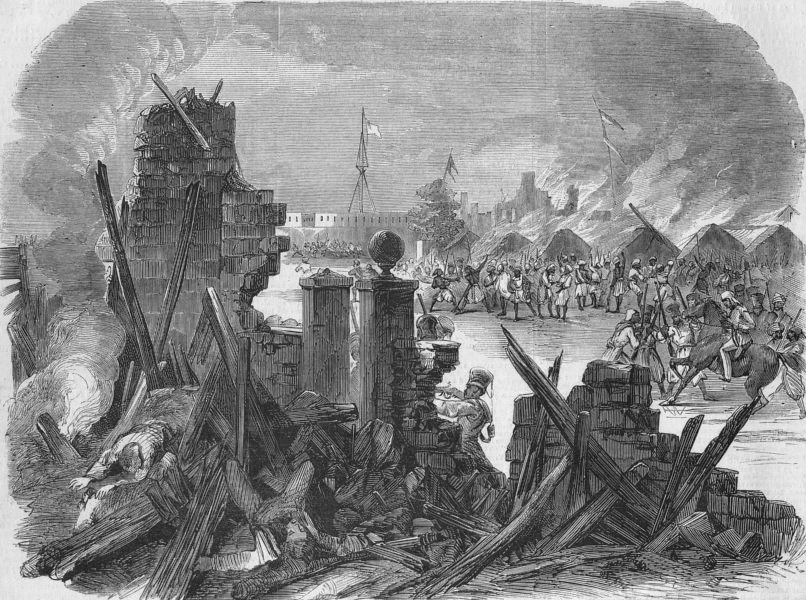
"The Sepoy revolt at Meerut", wood-engraving from the Illustrated London News, 1857

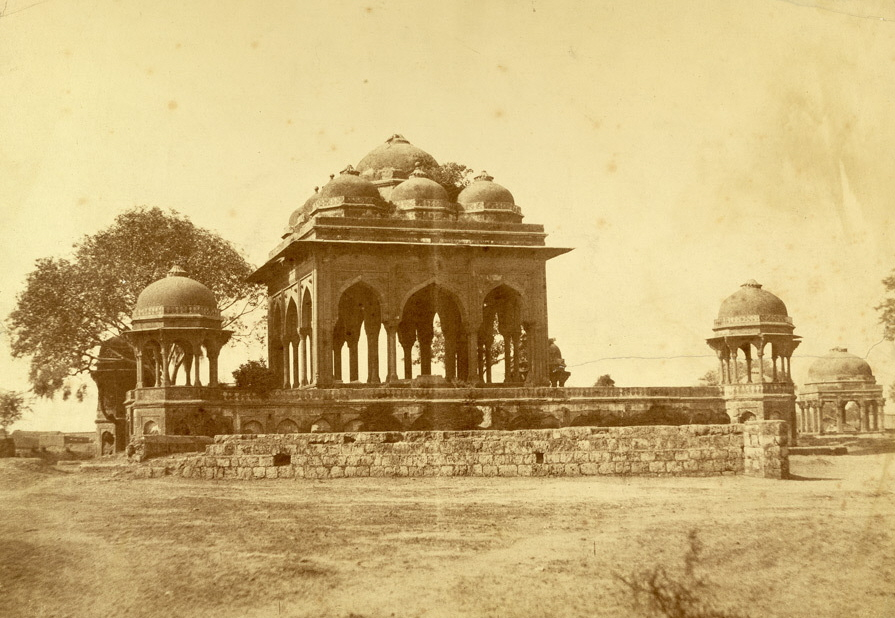
An 1858 photograph by Robert Christopher Tytler and Harriet Tytler of a mosque in Meerut where some of the rebel soldiers may have prayed

On 10 May, Meerut was already met with unrest, with angry protests in the bazaar and some buildings being set on fire. In the evening, most British officers were preparing to attend church, while many of the British soldiers were off duty and had gone into canteens or into the bazaar in Meerut. Also a rumour spread, that British troops were about to disarm more sepoy troops. At this moment, the mutinied Indian troops, led by the 3rd Cavalry, broke into open revolt. British junior officers who attempted to quell the first outbreaks were killed by the rebels. Other numerous officers' and civilians' quarters were attacked, and four civilian men, eight women and eight children were killed. Among the killed officers was Colonel John Finnis, who died on the Meerut parade ground as the first European military victim of the whole conflict.

Crowds in the bazaar attacked off-duty soldiers there. About 50 Indian civilians, some of them officers' servants who tried to defend or conceal their employers, were also killed by the sepoys. While the action of the sepoys in freeing their 85 imprisoned comrades appears to have been spontaneous, some civilian rioting in the city was reportedly encouraged by Kotwal (chief police officer) Dhan Singh Gurjar. Sepoys from the 11th and the 20th Native Infantry Regiments then stormed the general jail and freed their fellow prisoners, who supported them.

== Massacre of civilians ==
On the evening of May 10 mobs attacked the British residential area and staged a massacre of British civilians in their residential quarter, Civil Lines. The British were taken by surprise and sought refuge in the British barracks until the mutineers had left the city on 11 May.

Two of the civilian victims were to become particularly notable: Charlotte Chambers and Mrs Dawson. Twenty-three-year-old Charlotte Chambers, who was pregnant, had her fetus cut out of her womb with a butcher's knife by the butcher Mowla Baksh of Saddar Bazaar. The murder was witnessed by her neighbour Mrs Craigie, who saw Chambers standing alone on the verandah while her house was set on fire. Craigie tried to send her servants to fetch Chambers, but they were unable to reach her until it was too late, and they found her naked, with the fetus cut out of her body and placed on her chest. It later emerged that Charlotte Chambers had previously bought meat from Mowla Baksh but had complained about its quality and said she would tell other British women about it, which threatened his business (he was later arrested and executed). Mrs Dawson and her husband were sick with smallpox, and went out onto the verandah when the mob arrived, where the husband was shot. Because Mrs. Dawson had smallpox, no one wanted to go near her because of the risk of infection, but the mob instead threw burning torches at her until she caught fire and was burned to death.

Forty-one British civilians were killed in the massacre: 25 men, eight women and eight children. Some of them had clearly been subjected to particularly cruel treatment, and several were found naked. One British soldier had his stomach cut open and his entrails exposed, and a nine-year-old girl had her cheeks cut out and her arms cut off. At least two British women were reported to have been raped, but as rape at that time was considered dishonourable to the victim, their names were kept secret. It is not known whether Charlotte Chambers was one of them, but her body was reportedly found naked. Anglo-Indians, Christian Indians, Indians employed by the British were also targets of the attack.

== Aftermath ==
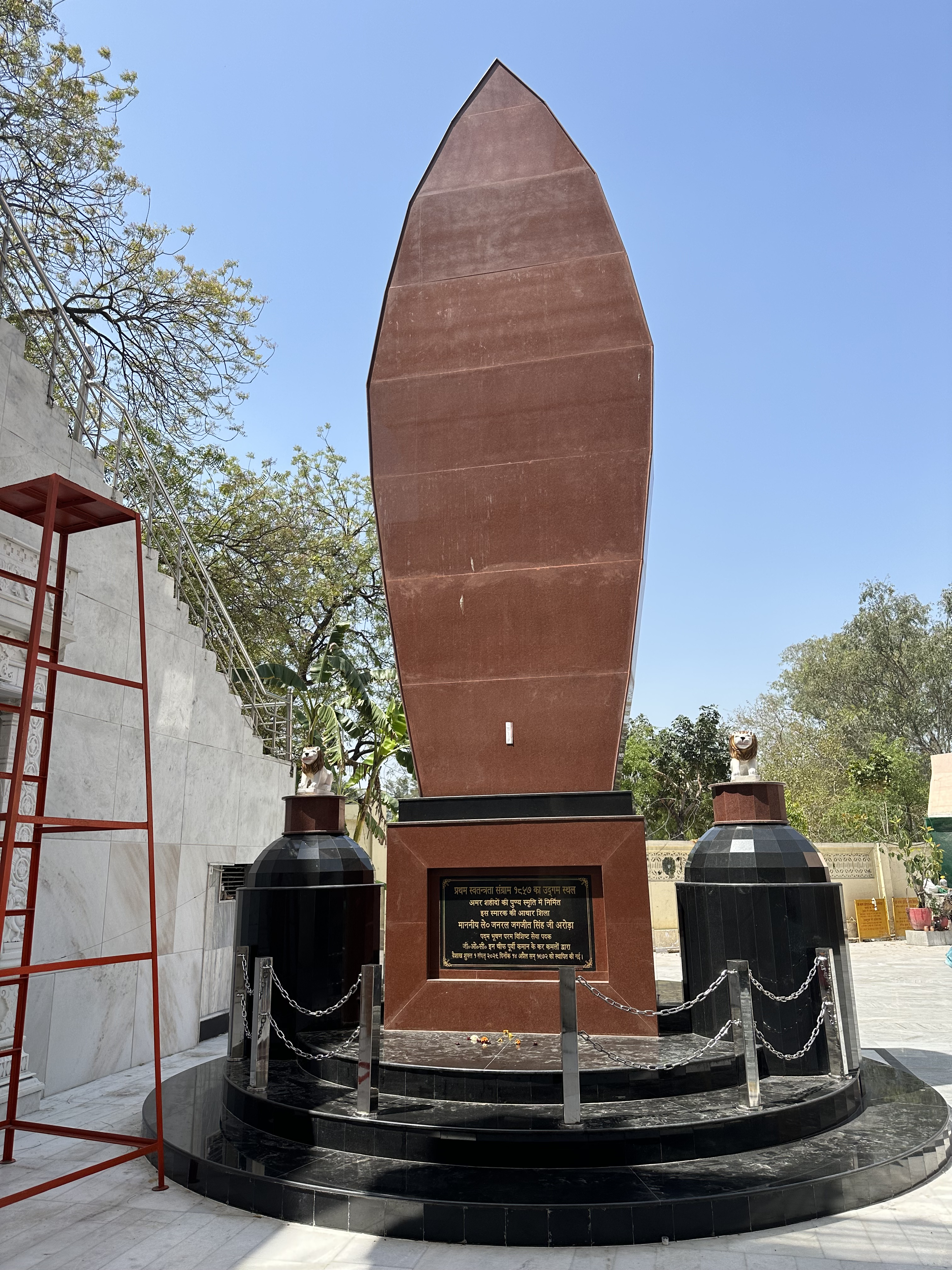
Mutiny memorial at Kali Paltan Mandir temple, Meerut

The sudden mutiny and massacre caught many senior British officers, many of whom were older men who had not been in active combat for many years, by surprise. The British garrison was not attacked, but officers fortified inside were unable to react adequately and then did little more than guard the civilians while they waited for reinforcements. Troops telegraphed to Shimla, Ambala and Agra, but did not reach Delhi to warn the British garrison there. Major-General W. H. Hewitt was later relieved of his command of the Meerut garrison for his poor handling of the situation.

The next day, 11 May, the rebel troops left Meerut and headed for Delhi, about 40 km east, to hail Bahadur Shah II as the monarch of a united India and to place him at the head of a rebellion against the British. Their arrival triggered the mutiny there, from where the rebellion was spread throughout British North India.

The murders of British civilians in Meerut, particularly the murder of Charlotte Chambers, were used as a battle cry by British soldiers (Remember Mrs Chambers!) during the rebellion until it was surpassed in notoriety by the Bibighar Massacre during the siege of Cawnpore.

== See also ==
- Indian rebellion of 1857
- Mangal Pandey

== Bibliography ==
- David, Saul (2003). The Indian Mutiny: 1857. London: Penguin Books. ISBN 978-0-14-100554-6.
- Edwardes, Michael (1963). Battles of the Indian Mutiny, Pan, ISBN 0-330-02524-4
- Edwardes, Michael (1975). Red Year. London: Sphere Books.
- Hibbert, Christopher (1980), The Great Mutiny: India 1857, London: Allen Lane, ISBN 978-0-14-004752-3
