= John Scott (British Army officer) =

Scottish politician and senior British Army officer

Major-General John Scott (1725–1775), of Balcomie and Scotstarvit, was a Scottish politician and senior British Army officer. He was nicknamed Pawky Scott (Pawky being in Scots dialect "sly, shrewd or one who tricks you").

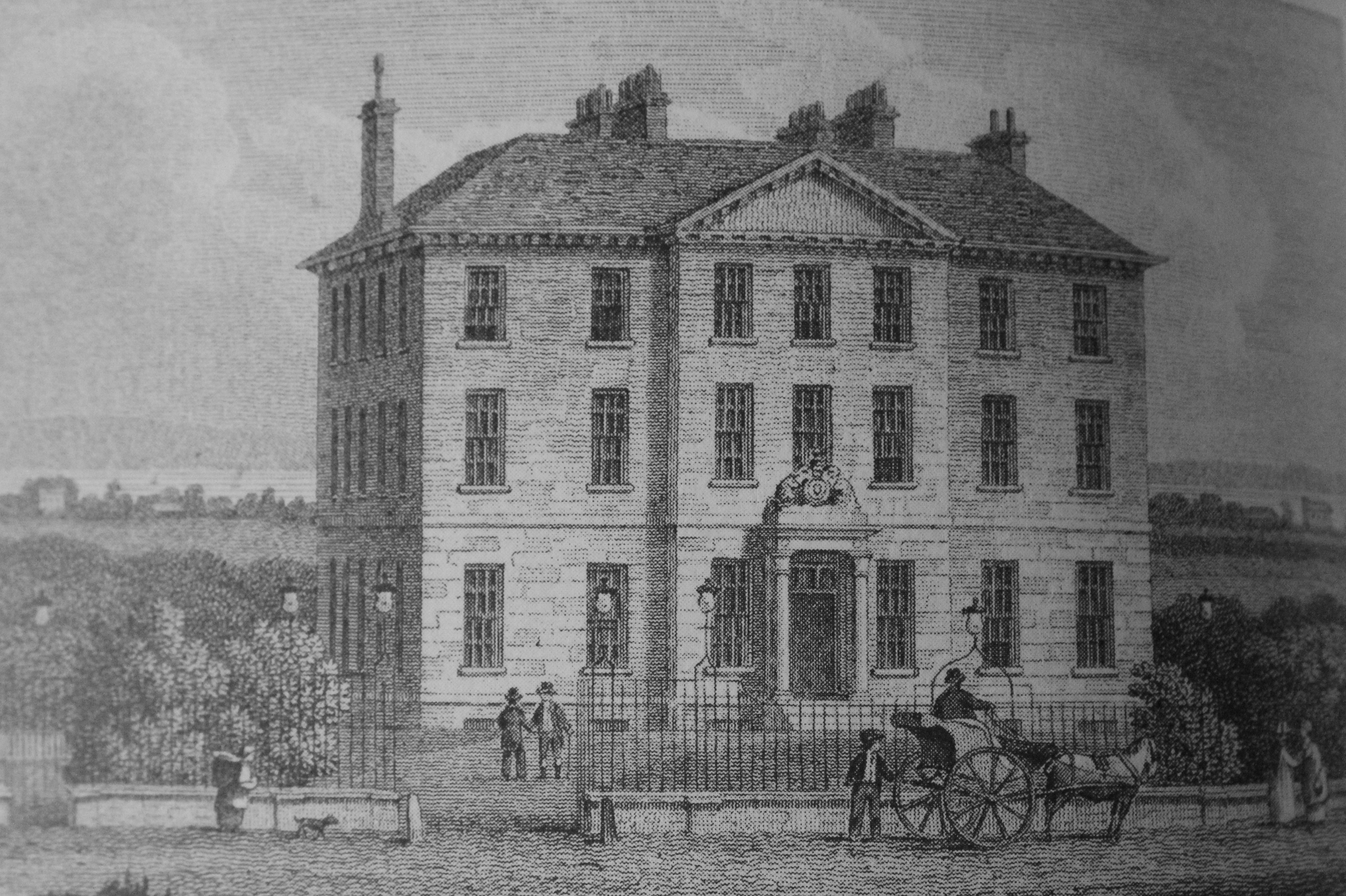
Bellevue Lodge in Edinburgh c.1810

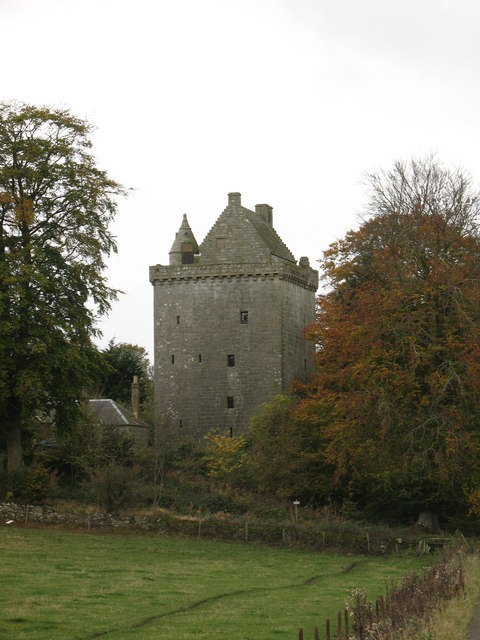
Scotstarvit Tower

== Life ==
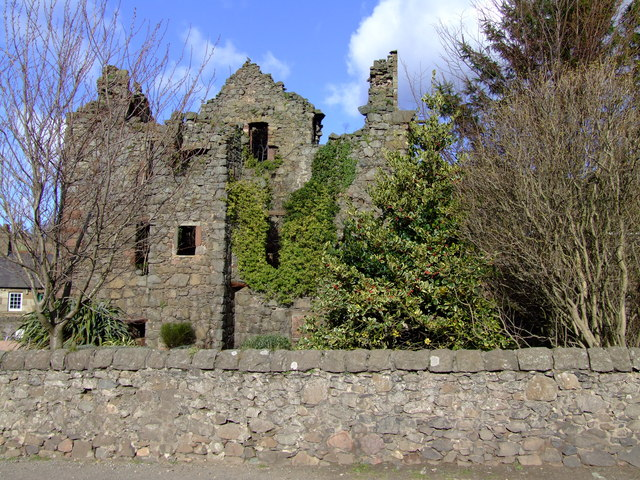
Denmylne Castle

He was born at Balcomie House near Crail in Fife, the son of David Scott of Scotstarvit Tower and his wife Lucy Gordon.

He joined the British Army in 1741 as an ensign in the 12th Regiment of Foot and rose via different regiments to the rank of Major-general in 1770.

He served as Colonel of the 108th regiment of Foot from 1762 to 1763 and as Colonel of the 26th (Cameronian) Regiment of Foot from 1763 to his death.

He was the Member of Parliament (MP) for Caithness from 1754 to 1761, for Tain Burghs from 1761 to 1768, and for Fife from 1768 until his death on 7 December 1775.

Im 1766 he inherited Scotstarvit Tower on the death of his father.

Through a mix of skill and luck he is said to have gained £500,000 through gambling, over and above his other inheritances and military income. This is around £60 million in modern terms.

In 1766 he won a huge bet made with Sir Lawrence Dundas in which he won Dundas House (now the HQ of the Royal Bank of Scotland). Dundas negotiated that he instead built Scott a new house to the north, on the site of Provost George Drummond's house: and this house was called Bellevue Lodge. This became Scott's Edinburgh home.

A successful gambler, he purchased Denmylne Castle in Fife in 1772. Not requiring the castle itself he allowed it to fall into a state of disrepair.

He died at Scotstarvit in 1775.

Bellevue House was converted to the Edinburgh Excise House after his death. It was demolished in 1842 to facilitate the construction of Scotland Street tunnel underneath.

== Gambling ==
George Devol asserted that -

General Scott, the father-in-law of George Canning, made one of the largest winnings ever known. He won at White's one million dollars [sic], owing to his sobriety and knowledge of the game of whist.

== Family ==
On 5 November 1770, he married Lady Mary Hay, daughter of James Hay, 15th Earl of Erroll, then 16 years old; they were divorced in 1771. It is mentioned in one source that she eloped with another man.

He married secondly, on 5 June 1773 the Hon Margaret Dundas, daughter of Robert Dundas, of Arniston, the younger. They had three daughters:

- Henrietta, born 1774, who married William Bentinck, 4th Duke of Portland;
- Lucy, born 28 March 1775, who married Francis Stuart, 10th Earl of Moray;
- Joan, born 15 March 1776 (three months after her father's death), who married George Canning, Prime Minister of the United Kingdom. She became 1st Viscountess Canning in her own right in 1828.

Parliament of Great Britain
Vacant alternating constituency Title last held by Alexander Brodie (to 1747)	Member of Parliament for Caithness; 1754–1761	Vacant alternating constituency Title next held by Viscount Fortrose (from 1768)
Preceded by Sir Harry Munro, 7th Bt	Member of Parliament for Tain Burghs; 1761–1768	Succeeded by Alexander Mackay
Preceded by James Wemyss	Member of Parliament for Fife; 1768–1775	Succeeded by James Townsend Oswald
Military offices
Preceded by Edward Sandford	Colonel of the 26th Regiment of Foot; 1763–1775	Succeeded by Lord Adam Gordon
