= Joan Canning, 1st Viscountess Canning =

Wife of British prime minister

Joan Canning, 1st Viscountess Canning (née Scott; 1776 – 14 March 1837) was the wife of British prime minister George Canning.

She was born in Scotland, the daughter of Major-General John Scott and Margaret Dundas. Her sisters were Henrietta Bentinck, Duchess of Portland and Lucy, wife of Francis Stuart, 10th Earl of Moray.

On 8 July 1800, she married George Canning in St George's, Hanover Square on Hanover Square, London, with John Hookham Frere and William Pitt the Younger as witnesses. They had four children:

- George Charles Canning (1801–1820), died from consumption
- William Pitt Canning (1802–1828), died from drowning in Madeira, Portugal
- Harriet Canning (1804–1876), married Ulick John de Burgh, 1st Marquess of Clanricarde
- Charles Canning (later 2nd Viscount Canning and 1st Earl Canning) (1812–1862)

On 22 January 1828, nearly six months after the death of her husband, Joan was created 1st Viscountess Canning of Kilbraham, with a special remainder to the heirs male of her late husband. She lived with her youngest son in the family's London home in Grosvenor Square.

== Arms ==
Coat of arms of Joan Canning, 1st Viscountess Canning
Coronet That of a Viscountess. Escutcheon Or, on a bend azure a mullet of six points between two crescents of the first differenced by a bordure engrailed gules and a crescent of the last (A difference of Scott of Buccleuch, Scotland). Supporters Dexter a lion Argent charged on the shoulder with three trefoils slipped Vert and holding in the sinister forepaw an arrow point downwards. Sinister a cormorant holding in its beak a branch of laver all Proper.

Peerage of the United Kingdom
New creation	Viscountess Canning; 1828–1837	Succeeded by Charles Canning
