= Edward Greaves (MP) =

British politician

Edward Greaves (21 September 1803 – 6 July 1879) was an English banker and Conservative politician who sat in the House of Commons in two periods between 1852 and 1874.

Greaves was the son of John Greaves of Radford Semele, Warwickshire and his wife Mary Whitehead, daughter of John Whitehead of Barford, Warwickshire. He was a banker at Warwick. He was a J.P. and Deputy Lieutenant for Warwickshire.

At the 1852 general election Greaves was elected Member of Parliament for Warwick. He lost the seat in 1865. He was re-elected for Warwick at the 1868 general election and held the seat until 1874.

Greaves died at the age of 75.

Greaves married in 1828 Anne (1796–1862), the widow of Thomas Ward who was the daughter of John Hobbins of Barford.

Parliament of the United Kingdom
| Preceded by William Collins; Sir Charles Eurwicke Douglas | Member of Parliament for Warwick; 1852–1865; With: George Repton | Succeeded by George Repton; Arthur Peel |
| Preceded by George Repton; Arthur Peel | Member of Parliament for Warwick; 1868–1874; With: Arthur Peel | Succeeded by George Repton; Arthur Peel |
