= George Repton =

British politician

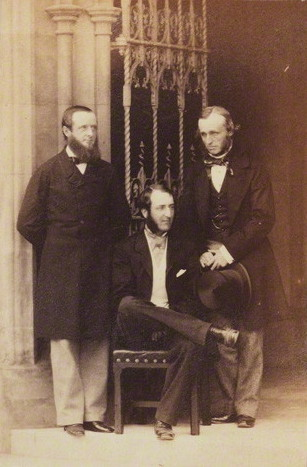
Francis Charles Hastings Russell, 9th Duke of Bedford; Sir Robert Nigel Fitzhardinge Kingscote; George William John Repton by Camille Silvy

George William John Repton (1818 – 30 August 1906) was a British Conservative Party politician who held a seat in the House of Commons for most of the period from 1841 to 1885, first as a Member of Parliament (MP) for St Albans and then for Warwick.

== Family ==
Repton was the son of George Stanley Repton and his wife Lady Elizabeth, daughter of John Scott, 1st Earl of Eldon.

He was educated at University College, Oxford, where he matriculated in 1838, and on 5 September 1848 he married Lady Jane Seymour FitzGerald, the only daughter of the Augustus FitzGerald, 3rd Duke of Leinster, who died on 3 November 1898.

His address was listed in 1881 as Odell Castle, Bedford.

== Career ==
Repton was elected at the 1841 general election as an MP for the borough of St Albans in Hertfordshire, where he was re-elected in 1847. However, a Royal Commission found evidence of extensive bribery in elections at the borough, which was disenfranchised in 1852.

He was returned at the 1852 general election as an MP for the borough of Warwick, where he was re-elected in 1857, 1859, and 1865, but did not stand in 1868. He was again returned to the Commons from Warwick at the 1874 general election, re-elected in 1880, and retired from Parliament when the parliamentary borough of Warwick was abolished at the 1885 general election.

Parliament of the United Kingdom
Preceded by George Muskett; The Earl of Listowel	Member of Parliament for St Albans; 1841–1852; With: The Earl of Listowel to 1846; Benjamin Bond Cabbell 1846–1847; Alexander Raphael 1847–1850; Jacob Bell from 1850	Writ suspended, then borough disenfranchised
Preceded by William Collins; Sir Charles Eurwicke Douglas	Member of Parliament for Warwick; 1852–1868; With: Edward Greaves; Arthur Peel	Succeeded by Edward Greaves; Arthur Peel
Preceded by Edward Greaves; Arthur Peel	Member of Parliament for Warwick; 1874–1885; With: Arthur Peel	Constituency abolished
