= Edward Bolton King =

British politician

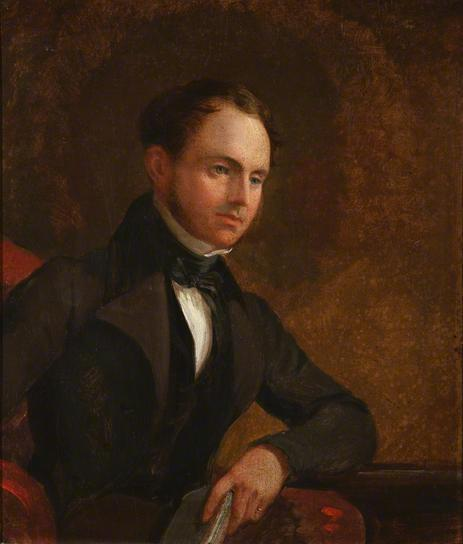
Edward Bolton King 1832

Edward Bolton King (15 July 1800 – 23 March 1878) was a British Whig politician from Umberslade in Nuthurst, Warwickshire.

== Family ==
King was the son of Edward King, Vice-Chancellor of the County Palatine of Lancaster, and the grandson of Rev. James King, Dean of Raphoe. He was the nephew of Captain James King, who accompanied James Cook on his last voyage round the world, the Rt. Rev. Walker King, Bishop of Rochester and of John King, Under-Secretary of State at the Home Office, and Pitt's spy-master during the French Revolution. In 1803, he inherited a fortune from his great uncle, Edward Bolton, of Preston, Lancashire and Askham Hall, Westmoreland. He was educated at Corpus Christi College, Oxford and Lincoln's Inn.

In 1826, he bought the Umberslade estate in Warwickshire from Lady Amherst for £75,000. The house had not been lived in since the death of the last Lord Archer, and so King had to spend some £13,000 on repairs. In 1834, he rebuilt the ancient chapel at Nuthurst, near Hockley Heath and also provided a school and land for a church in Hockley Heath itself. In 1846, he leased out Umberslade and moved to the house that his father-in-law had recently rebuilt at Chadshunt. In 1858, he sold the Umberslade estate to George Frederick Muntz, son of the Polish industrialist, George Muntz.

In 1828 King married Georgiana (d. 1858), the younger daughter and eventual heiress of Robert Knight of Barrells, Warwickshire, by whom he had one surviving son and six daughters. In 1859 he married Louisa Palmer, by whom he had another son and two daughters.

== Career ==
King was High Sheriff of Warwickshire in 1830, and at the 1831 general election he was elected Member of Parliament (MP) for Warwick. He was re-elected in 1832 and 1835, but was defeated at the 1837 general election.

In the 1857 general election, he was returned unopposed as one of the two MPs for South Warwickshire. The nomination process took place at the Shire Hall in Warwick, where King was nominated by Sir Francis Shuckburgh, who described King as "no Radical but a Whig Conservative". In his acceptance speech, King stated that he had pledged himself to be independent of all political parties, but would support Lord Palmerston (the Prime Minister), who he believed deserved credit for the satisfactory conclusion of the Crimean War. He served only two years as MP for South Warwickshire, and did not contest the 1859 general election. He was latterly Chairman of the South Warwickshire Liberal Association.

King died on 23 March 1878, aged 77. His will, dated 24 November 1876, made generous provision for his second wife and his children by her, but left most of the rest of his estate in tail to his only son by his first marriage, Edward Raleigh King. His estate was valued at less than £80,000.

Parliament of the United Kingdom
Preceded by Sir Charles Greville; John Tomes	Member of Parliament for Warwick; 1831–1837; With: John Tomes to 1832; Sir Charles Greville 1832–36; Charles Canning 1836 – March 1837; William Collins from March 1837	Succeeded by Sir Charles Eurwicke Douglas; William Collins
Preceded by Lord Guernsey; Evelyn Shirley	Member of Parliament for South Warwickshire; 1857–1859; With: Evelyn Shirley	Succeeded by Sir Charles Mordaunt, Bt; Evelyn Shirley
