= George Canning (writer) =

- Born: c. 1730; Garvagh, County Londonderry, Ireland
- Died: 11 April 1771 (aged 40–41); Middle Temple, London, England
- Spouse: Mary Ann Costello (m. 1768)
- Children: 3, including George

George Canning (c. 1730 – 11 April 1771) was an Irish writer and father of British prime minister, George Canning.

== Life ==
George Canning was born around 1730 in Garvagh, County Londonderry. He was the eldest of 3 sons of Stratford Canning and Letitia Newburgh. It is believed that Canning's father was incredibly strict, and disinherited him when he was engaged in a relationship which his father did not approve of. After this, Canning was allowed an allowance of £150 a year. His nephew by his brother Stratford, who was also disinherited, went on to be Stratford Canning, 1st Viscount Stratford de Redcliffe. His other brother, Paul, inherited the family estate, and his son was George Canning, 1st Baron Garvagh.

Canning moved to London where he entered the Middle Temple on 23 June 1752. He was then called to the English bar in 1764. He supported the radical politician John Wilkes. Canning was an unsuccessful lawyer, and also a failed wine merchant. In 1762 he published his modern version of Horace's first Satire, followed by a Translation of Anti-Lucretius in 1766, and An appeal to the public against the Critical Review and Poems in 1767.

He married Mary Ann Costello in Marylebone church on 21 May 1768. His literary career was a failure, and he died on 11 April 1771 in the Middle Temple in poverty from inflammation of the bowels. He and Mary Ann had three children, Letitia and Thomas who died in infancy, and a surviving son, George, a Tory politician who became prime minister.

== Selected works ==
- Horace's first Satire (1762)
- Translation of Anti-Lucretius (1766)
- An appeal to the public against the Critical Review (1767)
- Poems (1767)
