= Mary Ann Costello =

Irish actress (1747–1827)

- Born: 1747; Ireland
- Died: 10 March 1827 (aged 79–80); Henrietta Street, Bath
- Occupation: actress
- Known for: George Canning (m. 1768; died 1771) Richard Hunn (m. 1783)
- Children: 13, including George Canning

Mary Ann Costello (1747 – 10 March 1827) was an Irish actress. Her son was the British prime minister George Canning.

== Life ==
Mary Ann Costello was born in Ireland in 1747. Her father was a Connacht squire, Jordan Costello. She appears to have been orphaned at a young age, and was raised in London by her maternal grandfather Col. Guydickens. She was lauded for her beauty, marrying George Canning in 1768 as a love match. Early 1769 Costello gave birth to a daughter, Letitia, who died a few months later. On 22 April 1770, she had the couple's second child, George Canning. By 1771, Costello was widowed and was pregnant again, with no financial support. Her third child, a son Thomas, also died in infancy. To support her young son she became an actress, debuting in Jane Shore at Theatre Royal, Drury Lane, in November 1773. It was not a success, and Costello had to instead work in more provincial theatre in the west and north of England. She then began a six-year relationship with Samuel Reddish, having five children with him, including two sets of twins. She referred to herself as Mrs Reddish, but there is no evidence of their marriage. Her eldest son, George, was removed from her care and went to live with his uncle Stratford Canning. She did not see him for eight years.

Costello married again in February 1783, to a silk mercer from Plymouth, Richard Hunn. The couple had five children, including another two sets of twins. Her acting career continued to attract ire, with a 12-year-old Canning being told she was unfit for respectable society. He continuously looked for ways to save his mother from poverty. In June 1791 he sent her 100 guineas, warning her that her acting could damage his future political career. Costello's marriage to Hunn ended in the 1790s, and she retired from acting. By this time Canning was an MP, and his half-brothers all clamoured for his help. Costello attempted to make money with an eye ointment, Collysium, but it was a failure. She also wrote a novel, The Offspring of Fancy.

Costello was kept at a distance from Canning while his career developed. She received an annual pension of £500 in 1803, and was able to live in greater comfort for the rest of her life. She was finally able to meet Canning's wife and children in 1804, four years after the couple had married. During the height of his career in the 1820s, Costello's past was used against Canning, with claims that her career and private life rendered him unsuitable for high political office. The whig, Lord Grey, declared that being the son of an actress disqualified Canning from serving as the British prime minister. A few months before Canning became prime minister, Costello died at Henrietta Street, Bath, on 10 March 1827.
