= Charles Eurwicke Douglas =

Sir Charles Eurwicke Douglas (12 May 1806 – 21 February 1887) was an English M.P.

== Life ==
Charles Eurwicke Douglas was the natural son of the Right Hon. Charles Philip Yorke.

He was educated at Harrow and St. John's College, Cambridge, where he graduated B.A. 1828, M.A. 1831. In 1832, he married Jane Mary Anne Des Voeux (d.12 November 1873), daughter of Sir Charles Des Voeux, 2nd Bart.

He was private secretary to Lord Ripon from 1830 to 1834, when his lordship was secretary of state for the colonies; was a commissioner of Greenwich Hospital from Aug. 1845 to July 1846; formerly King of Arms of the Order of St. Michael and St. George, on appointment to which office he was knighted. He was a Director of the London and North Western Railway.

He was M.P. for Warwick from 1837 to 1852. In 1853, he unsuccessfully contested Durham City. He sat for Banbury from May 1859 to 1865.

Douglas received a knighthood 12 October 1832.

He lived at 27, Wilton Crescent, London, S.W.

Parliament of the United Kingdom
Preceded by Edward Bolton King; William Collins	Member of Parliament for Warwick; 1837–1852; With: William Collins	Succeeded by George Repton; Edward Greaves
Preceded by Bernhard Samuelson	Member of Parliament for Banbury; 1859–1865	Succeeded by Bernhard Samuelson
