= Arthur Peel, 1st Viscount Peel =

British politician (1829–1912)

The Right Honourable The Viscount Peel PC
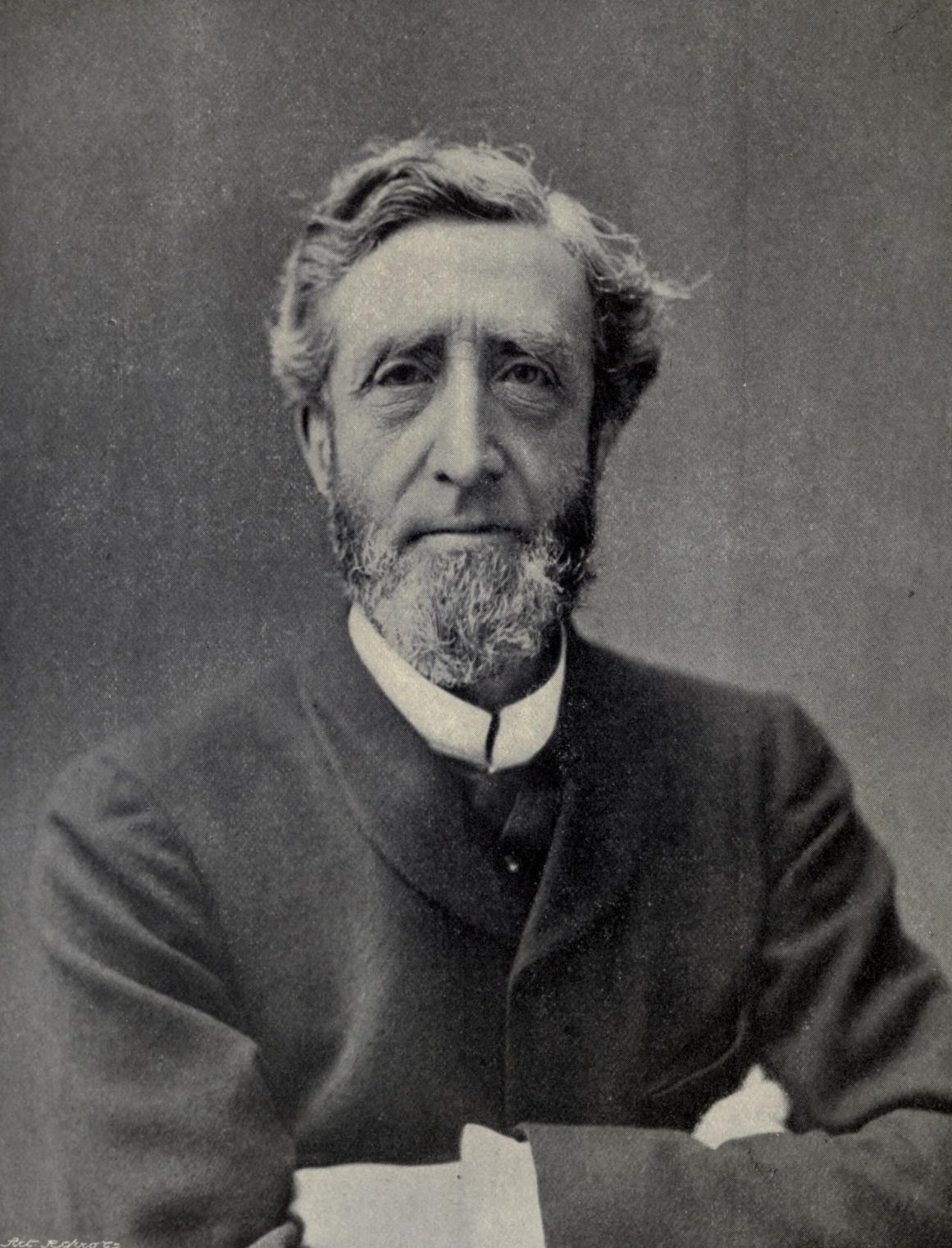
- Peel, c. 1890s

Speaker of the House of Commons of the United Kingdom
- In office 26 February 1884 – 8 April 1895
- Monarch: Victoria
- Prime Minister: William Ewart Gladstone; Robert Gascoyne-Cecil; William Ewart Gladstone; Robert Gascoyne-Cecil; William Ewart Gladstone; Archibald Primrose
- Preceded by: Sir Henry Brand
- Succeeded by: Sir William Gully

Parliamentary Under-Secretary of State for Home Affairs
- In office 28 April 1880 – 1 January 1881
- Prime Minister: William Ewart Gladstone
- Preceded by: Matthew White Ridley
- Succeeded by: Leonard Courtney

Parliamentary Secretary to the Treasury
- In office 1 August 1873 – 17 February 1874
- Prime Minister: William Ewart Gladstone
- Preceded by: George Glyn
- Succeeded by: William Hart Dyke

Parliamentary Secretary to the Board of Trade
- In office 14 January 1871 – 1 August 1873
- Prime Minister: William Ewart Gladstone
- Preceded by: George Shaw-Lefevre
- Succeeded by: George Cavendish-Bentinck

Parliamentary Secretary to the Poor Law Board
- In office 10 December 1868 – 14 January 1871
- Prime Minister: William Ewart Gladstone
- Preceded by: Michael Hicks Beach
- Succeeded by: Office abolished

Member of the House of Lords
- Lord Temporal
- In office 11 May 1895 – 24 October 1912
- Preceded by: Peerage created
- Succeeded by: The 2nd Viscount Peel

Member of Parliament for Warwick and Leamington
- In office 18 December 1885 – 11 May 1895
- Preceded by: Constituency established
- Succeeded by: Alfred Lyttelton

Member of Parliament for Warwick
- In office 24 July 1865 – 18 December 1885
- Preceded by: Edward Greaves
- Succeeded by: Constituency abolished

Personal details
- Born: 3 August 1829
- Died: 24 October 1912 (aged 83)
- Party: Liberal; Liberal Unionist
- Spouse: Adelaide Dugdale (died 1890)
- Children: 7, including William, George, and Sidney
- Parents: Sir Robert Peel; Julia Floyd
- Education: Balliol College, Oxford
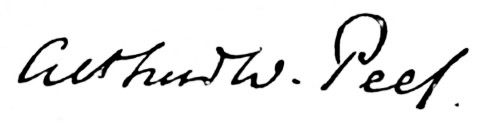
- Signature

Arthur Wellesley Peel, 1st Viscount Peel, PC (3 August 1829 – 24 October 1912), was a British Liberal politician, who sat in the House of Commons from 1865 to 1895. He was Speaker of the House of Commons from 1884 until 1895, when he was raised to the peerage.

== Early life ==
Peel was the fifth and youngest son of the Conservative Prime Minister Sir Robert Peel by his wife, Julia, the daughter of General Sir John Floyd, 1st Baronet. Peel was named after Arthur Wellesley, Duke of Wellington, and was educated at Eton and Balliol College, Oxford.

== Political career ==
Peel was elected Liberal Member of Parliament (MP) for Warwick in the 1865 general election and held the seat until 1885, when it was replaced under the Redistribution of Seats Act 1885 (48 & 49 Vict. c. 23). From 1868 to 1871, he was Parliamentary Secretary to the Poor Law Board and then became Parliamentary Secretary to the Board of Trade. In 1873 to 1874, he was patronage secretary to the Treasury, and in 1880, he became Under-Secretary of State for Home Affairs in William Ewart Gladstone's second government. On the retirement of Sir Henry Brand, Peel was elected Speaker of the House of Commons on 26 February 1884.

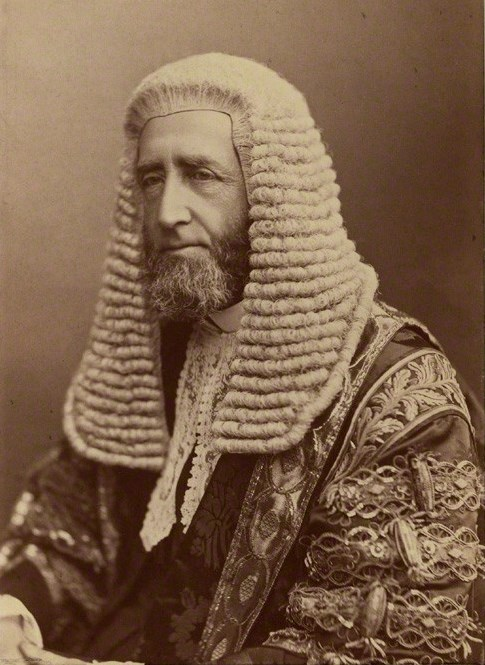
Speaker Peel, c. 1888

In the 1885 general election, Peel was elected for Warwick and Leamington. Throughout his career as Speaker, as the Encyclopædia Britannica Eleventh Edition noted, "he exhibited conspicuous impartiality, combined with a perfect knowledge of the traditions, usages and forms of the House, soundness of judgment, and readiness of decision upon all occasions". Though officially impartial, Peel left the Liberal Party over the issue of Home Rule and became a Liberal Unionist. Peel was also an important ally of Charles Bradlaugh, whose campaigns to have the oath of allegiance changed eventually permitted non-Christians, such as agnostics and atheists, to serve in the House of Commons.

Mr. Speaker's Retirement Act 1895 (Note: Section 3.)
- Act of Parliament
- Parliament of the United Kingdom
- Long title: An Act for settling and securing an Annuity upon the Right Honourable Arthur Wellesley Peel in consideration of his eminent Services.
- Citation: 58 & 59 Vict. c. 10
- Territorial extent: United Kingdom

Dates
- Royal assent: 14 May 1895
- Commencement: 14 May 1895 (Note: The Acts of Parliament (Commencement) Act 1793.)
- Repealed: 27 July 1971
Other legislation
| Repealed by | Statute Law (Repeals) Act 1971 |

Status: Repealed

Text of statute as originally enacted

Peel retired for health reasons prior to the 1895 general election and was created Viscount Peel, of Sandy in the County of Bedford, with a pension of £4,000 for life by Mr. Speaker's Retirement Act 1895 (58 & 59 Vict. c. 10). He was presented with the Freedom of the City of London in July of that year. In 1896, he was chairman of a royal commission into the licensing laws. Other members of the commission disagreed with part of his report, and he resigned the chair, which left Sir Algernon West to complete a majority report. However, the report was published in Peel's name and recommended that the number of licensed houses should be greatly reduced. The report was a valuable weapon in the hands of reformers.

A street in Warwick, Peel Road, was named in his honour.

== Family ==
Peel married Adelaide Dugdale (14 November 1839 – 5 December 1890), daughter of William Stratford Dugdale, in 1862. She died in December 1890 and Lord Peel remained a widower until his death in October 1912, aged 83. They had seven children:

- Julia Beatrice Peel (1864–1949) married the Irish Parliamentary Party MP James Rochfort Maguire
- William [Wellesley] Peel (1867–1937) succeeded as 2nd Viscount; created Earl Peel in 1929
- [Arthur] George [Villiers] Peel (1868–1956), politician and author
- Sidney [Cornwallis] Peel (1870–1938), a colonel and, for four years, an MP, created a baronet in 1936
- Agnes [Mary] Peel (1869x71–1959) married the Conservative MP Sydney Goldman.
- Ella [Frances] Peel (1872–1900)
- Maurice Berkeley Peel (1873–1917), Church of England vicar, later a military chaplain, killed in action in the First World War.

== Notes ==
Parliament of the United Kingdom
| Preceded by George Repton; Edward Greaves | Member of Parliament for Warwick; 1865–1885; With: George Repton 1865–1868, 1874–1885; Edward Greaves 1868–1874 | Constituency abolished |
| New constituency | Member of Parliament for Warwick and Leamington; 1885–1895 by-election | Succeeded by Alfred Lyttelton |
Political offices
| Preceded by Sir Michael Hicks Beach, Bt | Parliamentary Secretary to the Poor Law Board; 1868–1871 | Office abolished |
| Preceded by George Shaw-Lefevre | Parliamentary Secretary to the Board of Trade; 1871–1874 | Succeeded by George Bentinck |
| Preceded by George Glyn | Parliamentary Secretary to the Treasury; 1873–1874 | Succeeded by William Hart Dyke |
| Preceded by Sir Matthew White Ridley, Bt | Under-Secretary of State for the Home Department; 1880–1881 | Succeeded by Leonard Courtney |
| Preceded by Hon. Sir Henry Brand | Speaker of the House of Commons; 1884–1895 | Succeeded by Sir William Gully |
Peerage of the United Kingdom
| New creation | Viscount Peel; 1895–1912; Member of the House of Lords (1895–1912) | Succeeded by William Peel |
