= William Collins (Warwick MP) =

British politician

Member of Parliament for Warwick
- In office 28 March 1837 – 7 July 1852 Serving with Charles Eurwicke Douglas (Jul 1837–1852); Edward Bolton King (Mar. 1837–Jul. 1837)
- Preceded by: Charles Canning; Edward Bolton King
- Succeeded by: George Repton; Edward Greaves

Personal details
- Died: 1859
- Party: Whig

William Collins (died 1859) was a British Whig politician

Collins was elected a Whig Member of Parliament for Warwick at a by-election in 1837—caused by the succession of Charles Canning to the peerage—and held the seat until 1852 when he did not seek re-election.

Parliament of the United Kingdom
Preceded by Charles Canning; Edward Bolton King	Member of Parliament for Warwick; 1837–1852; With: Charles Eurwicke Douglas (Jul 1837–1852); Edward Bolton King (Mar. 1837–Jul. 1837)	Succeeded by George Repton; Edward Greaves
