= Earl Canning =

Title in the Peerage of the United Kingdom

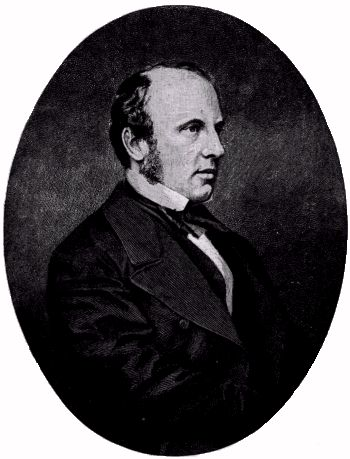
Charles John Canning, 1st Earl Canning

Earl Canning was a title in the Peerage of the United Kingdom. It was created in 1859 for the Conservative politician and then Viceroy of India, Charles Canning, 2nd Viscount Canning. He was the third and youngest son of the noted politician George Canning, Foreign Secretary from 1807 to 1809 and from 1822 to 1827, and Chancellor of the Exchequer and Prime Minister of the United Kingdom in 1827. In 1828 George Canning's widow Joan was raised to the Peerage of the United Kingdom in honour of her husband as Viscountess Canning, of Kilbraham in the County of Kilkenny, with remainder to the heirs male of her body by her late husband. Lady Canning was the daughter of Major-General John Scott.

The first Earl Canning was childless and on his death in 1862 both titles became extinct.

Two other members of the Canning family also gained distinction. Stratford Canning, 1st Viscount Stratford de Redcliffe, and George Canning, 1st Baron Garvagh, were both first cousins of George Canning.

== Viscounts Canning (1828) ==
- Joan Canning, 1st Viscountess Canning (1777–1837)
  - George Charles Canning (1801–1820)
  - William Pitt Canning (1802–1828)
- Charles John Canning, 2nd Viscount Canning (1812–1862) (created Earl Canning in 1859)

== Earls Canning (1859) ==
- Charles John Canning, 1st Earl Canning (1812–1862)

== See also ==
- Viscount Stratford de Redcliffe
- Baron Garvagh
