= George Canning =

Prime Minister of the United Kingdom in 1827

The Right Honourable George Canning FRS
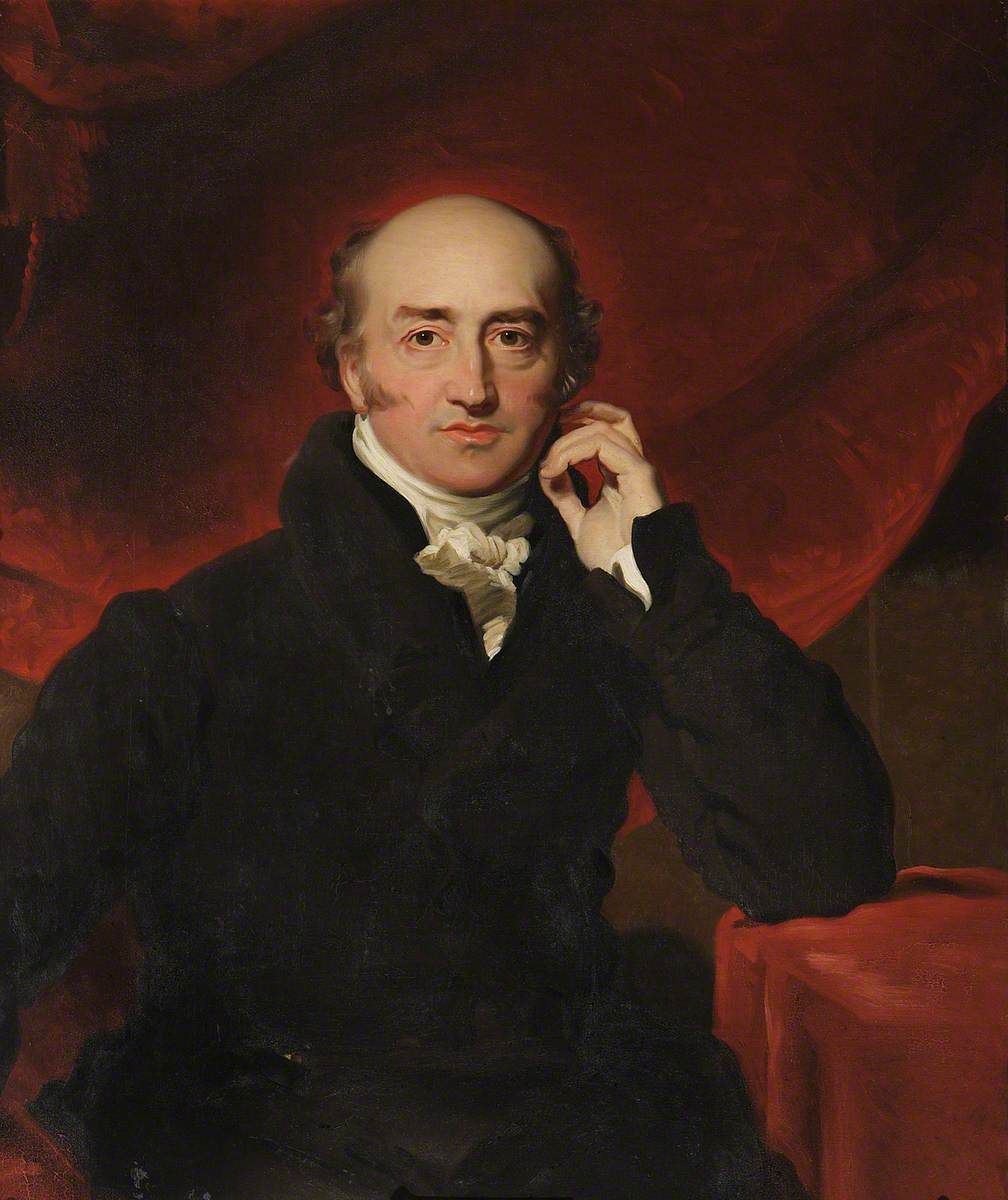
- Portrait by Thomas Lawrence, c. 1822

Prime Minister of the United Kingdom
- In office 12 April 1827 – 8 August 1827
- Monarch: George IV
- Preceded by: The Earl of Liverpool
- Succeeded by: The Viscount Goderich

Chancellor of the Exchequer
- In office 20 April 1827 – 8 August 1827
- Prime Minister: himself
- Preceded by: F. J. Robinson
- Succeeded by: John Charles Herries

Foreign Secretary
- In office 16 September 1822 – 30 April 1827
- Prime Minister: The Earl of Liverpool himself
- Preceded by: The Marquess of Londonderry
- Succeeded by: The Viscount Dudley and Ward
- In office 25 March 1807 – 11 October 1809
- Prime Minister: The Duke of Portland
- Preceded by: Viscount Howick
- Succeeded by: The Earl Bathurst

Leader of the House of Commons
- In office 16 September 1822 – 20 April 1827
- Prime Minister: The Earl of Liverpool; Himself
- Preceded by: The Marquess of Londonderry
- Succeeded by: William Huskisson

President of the Board of Control
- In office 20 June 1816 – 16 January 1821
- Prime Minister: The Earl of Liverpool
- Preceded by: The Earl of Buckinghamshire
- Succeeded by: Charles Bathurst

British Ambassador to Portugal
- In office 10 October 1814 – 6 June 1815
- Appointed by: The Prince Regent
- Preceded by: Sir Charles Stuart
- Succeeded by: Thomas Sydenham

Treasurer of the Navy
- In office 14 May 1804 – 23 January 1806
- Prime Minister: William Pitt the Younger
- Preceded by: George Tierney
- Succeeded by: Richard Brinsley Sheridan

Paymaster of the Forces
- In office 5 July 1800 – 26 March 1801
- Prime Minister: William Pitt the Younger
- Preceded by: Dudley Ryder
- Succeeded by: The Lord Glenbervie

Personal details
- Born: 11 April 1770 Marylebone, Middlesex, England
- Died: 8 August 1827 (aged 57) Chiswick, Middlesex, England
- Resting place: Westminster Abbey
- Party: Tory
- Spouse: Joan Scott (m. 1800)
- Children: 4 (including Charles Canning, 1st Earl Canning)
- Parents: George Canning Sr.; Mary Ann Costello
- Education: Christ Church, Oxford

George Canning (11 April 1770 – 8 August 1827) was a British statesman and Tory politician. He became Prime Minister of the United Kingdom on 12 April 1827, but his premiership was cut short by his death 119 days later on 8 August 1827. Canning also figured prominently in the cabinets of Robert Jenkinson, 2nd Earl of Liverpool, and William Cavendish-Bentinck, 3rd Duke of Portland, serving two terms as Foreign Secretary.

The son of an actress and of a failed businessman and lawyer, Canning was supported financially by his uncle, Stratford Canning, which allowed him to attend Eton College and Christ Church, Oxford. Canning entered politics in 1793 and rose rapidly. He was Paymaster of the Forces (1800–1801) and Treasurer of the Navy (1804–1806) under William Pitt the Younger. Canning was foreign secretary (1807–1809) under the Duke of Portland. Canning was the dominant figure in the cabinet and directed the Battle of Copenhagen, the seizure of the Danish fleet in 1807 to assure Britain's naval supremacy over Napoleon. In 1809, he was wounded in a duel with his rival Lord Castlereagh and was shortly thereafter passed over as a successor to the Duke of Portland in favour of Spencer Perceval. He rejected overtures to serve as foreign secretary again because of Castlereagh's presence in Perceval's Cabinet and he remained out of high office until after Perceval was assassinated in 1812.

Canning served under the new prime minister the Earl of Liverpool as British Ambassador to Portugal (1814–1816), President of the Board of Control (1816–1821) and foreign secretary and Leader of the House of Commons (1822–1827). King George IV disliked Canning and there were efforts to frustrate his foreign policies. Canning gained much public support for his policies. The historian Paul Hayes argues that he achieved several diplomatic coups in relations with Spain and Portugal, by helping to guarantee the independence of the American colonies of Portugal and Spain. His policies ensured a major trading advantage for British merchants and supported the American Monroe Doctrine. The historian G. M. Trevelyan wrote

For five years England had been guided by the genius of Canning, and seldom have so much brilliancy and so much wisdom combined to produce such happy results. The constitutional medium through which that genius worked was the loyal friendship of the prime minister, Lord Liverpool.

When Lord Liverpool resigned in April 1827, Canning was chosen to succeed him as prime minister, ahead of the Duke of Wellington and Sir Robert Peel. Both of them declined to serve under Canning, and as a result the Tories divided into Peel and Wellington's Ultra-Tories and the Canningites. Canning then invited several Whigs to join his cabinet. His health collapsed, and he died of pneumonia at Chiswick House on 8 August 1827, whilst still in office. His tenure in office of 119 days made him the shortest-serving prime minister in history until Liz Truss's 49-day premiership in 2022.

== Early life ==
Canning was born into an Anglo-Irish family at his parents' home in Queen Anne Street, Marylebone, London. Canning described himself as "an Irishman born in London". His father, George Canning of Garvagh, County Londonderry, in Ulster, the northern province in Ireland, was a gentleman of limited means, a failed wine merchant and lawyer, who renounced his right to inherit the family estate in exchange for payment of his substantial debts. George Sr. eventually abandoned the family and died in poverty on 11 April 1771, his son's first birthday, in London. Canning's mother, Mary Ann Costello, who was also Irish, took work as a stage actress, a profession not considered respectable at the time. Indeed, when in 1827 it looked as if Canning would become prime minister, Lord Grey remarked that he "regarded the son of an actress as incapacitated de facto for the Premiership of England".

Because Canning showed unusual intelligence and promise at an early age, family friends persuaded his uncle, London merchant Stratford Canning (father of the diplomat Stratford Canning), to become his nephew's guardian. George Canning grew up with his cousins at the home of his uncle, who provided him with an income and an education. Stratford Canning's financial support allowed the young Canning to study at Hyde Abbey School, Eton College and Christ Church, Oxford. Canning came out top of the school at Eton and left at the age of seventeen. His time at Eton has been described as "a triumph almost without parallel. He proved a brilliant classicist, came top of the school, and excelled at public orations".

Canning struck up friendships with the future Lord Liverpool as well as with Granville Leveson-Gower and John Hookham Frere. In 1789 he won a prize for his Latin poem The Pilgrimage to Mecca which he recited in Oxford Theatre. Canning began practising law after receiving his BA from Oxford in the summer of 1791, but he wished to enter politics.

== Entry into politics ==
Stratford Canning was a Whig and would introduce his nephew in the 1780s to prominent Whigs such as Charles James Fox, Edmund Burke, and Richard Brinsley Sheridan. George Canning's friendship with Sheridan would last for the remainder of Sheridan's life.

George Canning's impoverished background and limited financial resources, however, made unlikely a bright political future in a Whig party whose political ranks were led mostly by members of the wealthy landed aristocracy in league with the newly rich industrialist classes. Regardless, along with Whigs such as Burke, Canning himself would become considerably more conservative in the early 1790s after witnessing the excessive radicalism of the French Revolution. "The political reaction which then followed swept the young man to the opposite extreme; and his vehemence for monarchy and the Tories gave point to a Whig sarcasm,—that men had often turned their coats, but this was the first time a boy had turned his jacket."

Thus, when Canning decided to enter politics, he sought and received the patronage of the leader of the "Tory" group, William Pitt the Younger. In 1793, thanks to the help of Pitt, Canning became a member of parliament for Newtown on the Isle of Wight, a rotten borough. In 1796, he changed seats to a different rotten borough, Wendover in Buckinghamshire. He was elected to represent several constituencies during his parliamentary career.

Canning rose quickly in British politics as an effective orator and writer. His speeches in Parliament as well as his essays gave the followers of Pitt a rhetorical power they had previously lacked. Canning's skills saw him gain leverage within the Pittite faction that allowed him influence over its policies along with repeated promotions in the Cabinet. Over time, Canning became a prominent public speaker as well, and was one of the first politicians to campaign heavily in the country.

As a result of his charisma and promise, Canning early on drew to himself a circle of supporters who would become known as the Canningites. Conversely though, Canning had a reputation as a divisive man who alienated many.

He was a dominant personality and often risked losing political allies for personal reasons. He once reduced Lord Liverpool to tears with a long satirical poem mocking Liverpool's attachment to his time as a colonel in the militia.

== Under Secretary of State for Foreign Affairs ==
On 2 November 1795, Canning received his first ministerial post: Under Secretary of State for Foreign Affairs. In this post he proved a strong supporter of Pitt, often taking his side in disputes with the foreign secretary, Lord Grenville. At the end of 1798 Canning responded to a resolution by George Tierney MP for peace negotiations with France:

I for my part still conceive it to be the paramount duty of a British member of parliament to consider what is good for Great Britain ... I do not envy that man's feelings, who can behold the sufferings of Switzerland, and who derives from that sight no idea of what is meant by the deliverance of Europe. I do not envy the feelings of that man, who can look without emotion at Italy – plundered, insulted, trampled upon, exhausted, covered with ridicule, and horror, and devastation – who can look at all this, and be at a loss to guess what is meant by the deliverance of Europe? As little do I envy the feelings of that man, who can view the peoples of the Netherlands driven into insurrection, and struggling for their freedom against the heavy hand of a merciless tyranny, without entertaining any suspicion of what may be the sense of the word deliverance. Does such a man contemplate Holland groaning under arbitrary oppressions and exactions? Does he turn his eyes to Spain trembling at the nod of a foreign master? And does the word deliverance still sound unintelligibly in his ear? Has he heard of the rescue and salvation of Naples, by the appearance and the triumphs of the British fleet? Does he know that the monarchy of Naples maintains its existence at the sword's point? And is his understanding, and his heart, still impenetrable to the sense and meaning of the deliverance of Europe?

Pitt called this speech "one of the best ever heard on any occasion".

He resigned his position at the Foreign Office on 1 April 1799.

=== The Anti-Jacobin ===
Canning was involved in the founding of the Anti-Jacobin, a newspaper which was published every Monday from 20 November 1797 to 9 July 1798. Its purpose was to support the government and condemn revolutionary doctrines through news and poetry, much of it written by Canning. Canning's poetry satirised and ridiculed Jacobin poetry. Before the appearance of the Anti-Jacobin all the eloquence (except for Burke's) and all the wit and ridicule had been on the side of Fox and Sheridan; Canning and his friends changed this. A young Whig, William Lamb (the future Lord Melbourne, Prime Minister) wrote an 'Epistle to the Editors of the Anti-Jacobin', which attacked Canning:

Who e'er ye are, all hail! – whether the skill
Of youthful CANNING guides the ranc'rous quill;
With powers mechanic far above his age,
Adapts the paragraph and fills the page;
Measures the column, mends what e'er's amiss,
Rejects THAT letter, and accepts of THIS;

=== Subsequent offices ===
In 1799 Canning became a commissioner of the Board of Control for India. Canning wrote on 16 April: "Here I am immersed in papers, of which I do not yet comprehend three words in succession; but I shall get at their meaning by degrees and at my leisure. No such hard work here as at my former office. No attendance but when I like it, when there are interesting letters received from India (as is now the case) or to be sent out there".

Canning was appointed Paymaster of the Forces (and was thus appointed also to the Privy Council) in 1800. In February 1801, Pitt resigned as prime minister due to George III's opposition to Catholic emancipation. Canning, despite Pitt's advice to stay in office, loyally followed him into opposition. The following day, Canning wrote to Lady Malmesbury: "I resign because Pitt resigns. And that is all".

== Backbenches ==
Canning disliked being out of office, and wrote to John Hookham Frere in summer 1801: "But the thought will obtrude itself now and then that I am not where I should be – non-hoc pollicitus." He also claimed that Pitt had done "scrupulously and magnanimously right by everyone but me". At the end of September 1801 Canning wrote to Frere, saying of Pitt: "I do love him, and reverence him as I should a Father – but a Father should not sacrifice me, with my good will. Most heartily I forgive him, But he has to answer to himself, and to the country for much mischief that he has done and much that is still to do." Pitt wished for Canning to enter Henry Addington's government, a move which Canning looked on as a horrible dilemma but in the end, he turned the offer down.

Canning opposed the preliminaries of the Peace of Amiens signed on 1 October. He did not vote against it due to his personal devotion to Pitt. He wrote on 22 November: "I would risk my life to be assured of being able to act always with P in a manner satisfactory to my own feelings and sense of what is right, rather than have to seek that object in separation from him." On 27 May 1802 in the Commons Canning requested that all grants of land in Trinidad (captured by Britain from Spain) should be rejected until Parliament had decided what to do with the island. The threat that it could be populated by slaves like other West Indian islands was real. Canning instead wanted it to have a military post and that it should be settled with ex-soldiers, free blacks and creoles, with the Native American population protected and helped. He also asserted that the island should be used to test the theory that better methods of cultivation in land would lessen the need for slaves. Addington acceded to Canning's demands and the Reverend William Leigh believed Canning had saved 750,000 lives.

At a dinner to celebrate Pitt's birthday in 1802, Canning wrote the song "The Pilot that Weathered the Storm", performed by a tenor from Drury Lane, Charles Dignum:

And oh! if again the rude whirlwind should rise,
The dawnings of peace should fresh darkness deform,
The regrets of the good and the fears of the wise
Shall turn to the Pilot that weathered the Storm.

In November Canning spoke out openly in support of Pitt in the Commons. One observer thought that Canning made incomparably the best speech and that his defence of Pitt's administration "one of the best things, either argumentatively as to matter, or critically and to manner and style" that he could ever remember. On 8 December Sheridan spoke out in defence of Addington and denied that Pitt was the only man who could save the country. Canning replied by criticising the Addington government's foreign policy and claimed that the House should recognise the greatness of the country and Pitt, who ought to be its leader. He argued against those, such as William Wilberforce, who held that Britain could safely maintain a policy of isolation: "Let us consider the state of the world as it is, not as we fancy it ought to be. Let us not seek to hide from our own eyes ... the real, imminent and awful danger which threatens us." Also, he objected to the notion that Britain could choose between greatness and happiness: "The choice is not in our power. We have ... no refuge in littleness. We must maintain ourselves what we are, or cease to have a political existence worth preserving." Furthermore, he openly declared for Pitt and said: "Away with the cant of 'measures, not men., the idle supposition that it is the harness and not the horses that draw the chariot along." Kingdoms rise and fall due to what degree they are upheld "not by well-meaning endeavours ... but by commanding, over-awing talents ... retreat and withdraw as much as he will, he must not hope to efface the memory of his past services from the gratitude of his country; he cannot withdraw himself from the following of a nation; he must endure the attachment of a people whom he has saved." In private Canning was fearful that if Pitt did not return to power, Fox would: "Sooner or later he must act or the country is gone."

Canning approved of the declaration of war against France on 18 May 1803. He was angered by Pitt's desire not to proactively work to turn out the ministry but support the ministry when it adopted sound policies. However, in 1804, to Canning's delight, Pitt began to work against the Addington government. After Pitt delivered a stinging attack on the government's defence measures on 25 April, Canning launched his own attack on Addington, which made Addington furious. On 30 April, Lord Eldon, the Lord Chancellor, asked Pitt to submit a new administration to the King.

== Treasurer of the Navy ==
Canning returned to office in 1804 with Pitt, becoming Treasurer of the Navy. In 1805 he offered Pitt his resignation after Addington was given a seat in the Cabinet. He wrote to Lady Hester to say he felt humiliated that Addington was a minister "and I am – nothing. I cannot help it, I cannot face the House of Commons or walk the streets in this state of things, as I am". Pitt, after reading this letter, summoned Canning to London for a meeting, at which he told him that if he resigned it would open a permanent breach between the two of them as it would cast a slur on his conduct. He offered Canning the office of Chief Secretary for Ireland, but Canning refused on the grounds that this would look like he was being got out of the way. Canning eventually decided not to resign and wrote that "I am resolved to 'sink or swim' with Pitt, though he has tied himself to such sinking company. God forgive him". Canning left office with the death of Pitt; he was not offered a place in Lord Grenville's administration.

== Foreign secretary ==
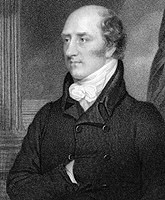
George Canning

Canning was appointed foreign secretary in the new government of the Duke of Portland in 1807. Given key responsibilities for the country's diplomacy in the Napoleonic Wars, he was responsible for planning the attack on Copenhagen in September 1807, much of which he undertook at his country estate, South Hill Park at Easthampstead in Berkshire.

After the defeat of Prussia by the French, the neutrality of Denmark looked increasingly fragile. Canning was worried that Denmark might, under French pressure, become hostile to Britain. On the night of 21/22 July 1807 Canning received intelligence directly from Tilsit (where Napoleon and Tsar Alexander I of Russia were negotiating a treaty) which appeared "to rest on good authority" that Napoleon had proposed to the Tsar a great naval combination against Britain, of which Denmark and Portugal would be members.

On 30 July a military force 25,000 strong set sail for Denmark, with Francis Jackson travelling the day after. Canning instructed Jackson that his overriding aim was to secure the possession of the Danish navy by offering the Danes a treaty of alliance and mutual defence whereby they would be given back their fleet at the end of the war. On 31 July Canning wrote to his wife: "The anxious interval between this day and the hearing the result of his [Jackson's] expedition will be long and painful indeed. Long, I mean, in feeling. In fact, it will be about a fortnight or three weeks ... I think we have made success almost certain. But the measure is a bold one and if it fails – why we must be impeached I suppose – and dearest dear will have a box at the trial". The day after he wrote that he had received a letter the previous night which provided an "account of the French being actually about to do that act of hostility, the possibility of which formed the groundwork of my Baltic plan. My fear was that the French might not be the aggressors – and then ours would have appeared a strong measure, fully justifiable I think and absolutely necessary, but without apparent necessity or justification. Now the aggression will justify us fully ... I am therefore quite easy as to the morality and political wisdom of our plan". Napoleon had on 31 July instructed his foreign minister, Talleyrand, to inform the Danes that if they did not wish for Holstein to be invaded and occupied by Jean Bernadotte they must prepare for war against Britain. Canning wrote to his wife on 1 August: "Now for the execution and I confess to my own love, I wake an hour or two earlier than I ought to, thinking of this execution. I could not sleep after asses' milk today, thought I was not in bed till 1/2 p. 2". On 25 August he wrote to Granville Leveson-Gower: "The suspense is, as you may well imagine, agitating and painful in the extreme; but I have an undiminished confidence as to the result, either by force or by treaty. The latter however is so infinitely preferable to the former that the doubt whether it has been successful is of itself almost as anxious as if the whole depended on it alone".

On 2 September, after Jackson's negotiations proved unsuccessful, the British fleet began bombarding Copenhagen until 7 pm on 5 September, when the Danes requested a truce. On 7 September the Danes agreed to hand over their navy (18 ships of the line, 15 frigates and 31 smaller ships) and naval stores and the British agreed to evacuate Zealand within six weeks. On 16 September Canning received the news with relief and excitement: "Did I not tell you we would save Plumstead from bombardment?" he wrote to the Reverend William Leigh. On 24 September he wrote to George Rose: "Nothing was ever more brilliant, more salutary or more effectual than the success [at Copenhagen]". On 30 September he wrote Lord Boringdon that he hoped Copenhagen would "stun Russia into her sense again". Canning wrote to Gower on 2 October 1807: "We are hated throughout Europe and that hate must be cured by fear". After the news of Russia's declaration of war against Britain reached London on 2 December, Canning wrote to Lord Boringdon two days later: "The Peace of Tilsit you see is come out. We did not want any more case for Copenhagen; but if we had, this gives it us".

On 3 February 1808, the opposition leader George Ponsonby requested the publication of all information on the strength and battle-worthiness of the Danish fleet sent by the British envoy at Copenhagen. Canning replied with a speech nearly three hours long, described by Lord Palmerston as "so powerful that it gave a decisive turn to the debate". Lord Grey said his speech was "eloquent and powerful" but that he had never heard such "audacious misrepresentation" and "positive falsehood". On 2 March the opposition moved a vote of censure over Copenhagen, defeated by 224 votes to 64 after Canning gave a speech, in the words of Lord Glenbervie, so "very witty, very eloquent and very able".

In November 1807, Canning oversaw the Portuguese royal family's flight from Portugal to Brazil.

=== Duel with Castlereagh ===
In 1809 Canning entered into a series of disputes within the government that were to become famous. He argued with the Secretary of State for War and the Colonies, Lord Castlereagh, over the deployment of troops that Canning had promised would be sent to Portugal but which Castlereagh sent to the Netherlands. The government became increasingly paralysed in disputes between the two men. Portland was in deteriorating health and gave no lead, until Canning threatened resignation unless Castlereagh were removed and replaced by Lord Wellesley. Portland secretly agreed to make this change when it would be possible.

Castlereagh discovered the deal in September 1809 and challenged Canning to a duel. Canning accepted the challenge and the Castlereagh–Canning duel was fought on 21 September 1809 on Putney Heath. Canning, who had never previously fired a pistol, widely missed his mark. Castlereagh, who was regarded as one of the best shots of his day, wounded his opponent in the thigh. There was much outrage that two cabinet ministers had resorted to such a method. The ailing Portland shortly afterwards resigned as prime minister, and Canning offered himself to George III as a potential successor. The King appointed Spencer Perceval instead, and Canning left office once more. He took consolation in the fact that Castlereagh also stood down.

Upon the assassination of Spencer Perceval in 1812, the new prime minister, Lord Liverpool, offered Canning the position of foreign secretary once more. Canning refused, as he also wished to be Leader of the House of Commons and was reluctant to serve in any government with Castlereagh. Castlereagh was appointed foreign secretary by Liverpool, replacing Wellesley who had resigned. Castlereagh remained in the post until his suicide in 1822, overseeing British participation in the final years of the Napoleonic Wars and the Congress of Vienna which redrew the map of Europe.

=== Move to Burbage ===
In April 1811, George moved the family from Castle Hill House in Hinckley to the nearby village of Burbage, where he took up residence in a house along Church Street, which in later years the house would become 'Burbage Constitutional Club'.

=== Ambassador to Lisbon ===
In 1814 Canning became the British Ambassador to Portugal, recently liberated from the French by Wellington's forces. He returned to Britain the following year. He received several further offers of office from Liverpool.

== President of the Board of Control ==
In 1816 he became President of the Board of Control.

Canning resigned from office once more in 1820, in opposition to the treatment of Queen Caroline, estranged wife of the new King George IV. Public opinion strongly supported the Queen and thereby Canning was strengthened.

On 16 March 1821, Canning spoke in favour of William Plunket's Catholic Emancipation Bill. Liverpool wished to have Canning back in the Cabinet, but the King was strongly hostile to him due to his actions over the Caroline affair. The King would only allow Canning back into the Cabinet if he did not have to deal personally with him. This required the office of Governor-General of India. After deliberating on whether to accept, Canning initially declined the offer but then accepted it. On 25 April he spoke in the Commons against Lord John Russell's motion for parliamentary reform and a few days later Canning moved for leave to introduce a measure of Catholic Emancipation (for lifting the exclusion of Catholics from the House of Lords). This passed the Commons but was rejected by the Lords.

== Foreign secretary and Leader of the House ==
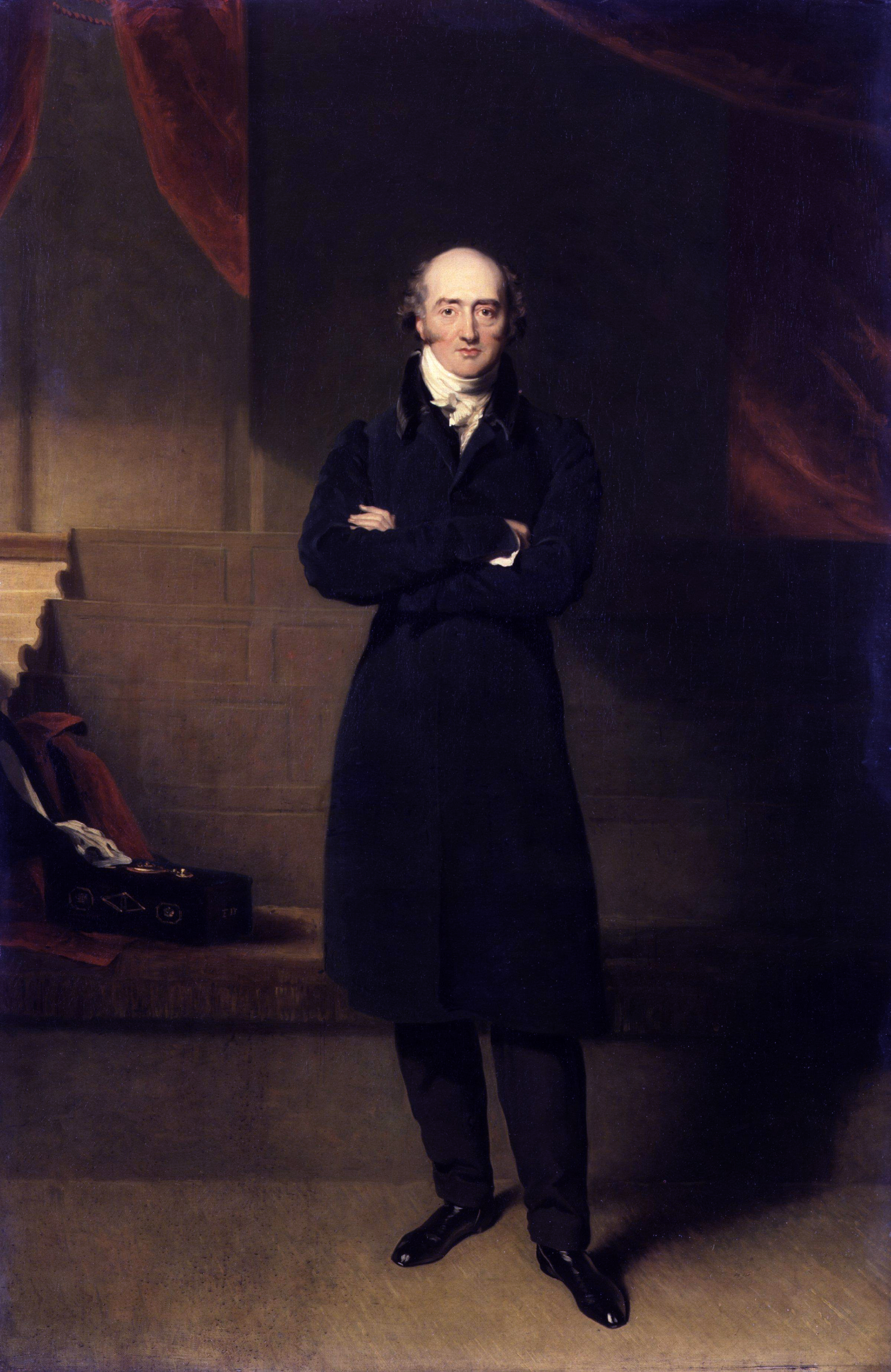
Canning by Richard Evans, circa 1825

In August 1822, Castlereagh committed suicide. Instead of going to India, Canning succeeded him as both foreign secretary and Leader of the House of Commons.

In a surprise to contemporaries, Canning continued many of Castlereagh's foreign policies, such as the view that the powers of Europe should not be allowed to meddle in the affairs of other states. This policy enhanced public opinion of Canning as a liberal, even if the man successfully moved to empower British capitalism and international influence particularly in oceanic trade. His most significant difference from Castlereagh as foreign minister was in Canning's abolitionism – as Castlereagh had been ambivalent toward slavery. It also is unlikely that Castlereagh, were he still alive, would have sided with anti-monarchic Spanish liberals or recognized new South American republics that had broken away from Spain in the 1820s as Canning did.

=== Southeast Asia ===
Canning signed the Anglo-Dutch Treaty of 1824 which resolved outstanding matters from the previous treaty intended to redistribute colonies formerly administered by the Dutch East India Company in the East Indies, which had been seized during the Napoleonic Wars by the British East India Company owing to Britain's position in the wake of the Napoleonic conquest of the Netherlands of recognising its holdings as hostile territory; the most violent conquest resulting from this policy was the 1811 invasion of Java led by Stamford Raffles. After the war, Raffles' extra-legal establishment of a trading post in Singapore, a vassal of the Dutch-backed Johor Sultanate, formed the flashpoint for the 1824 renegotiation.

This treaty's impact has lasted until the present day, with the established borders essentially being those between the modern nation-states of Malaysia and Indonesia; Singapore also was ruled directly by the EIC from that point on, with the former arrangement of equal control between Sultan Hussein Shah, Temenggong Abdul Rahman and Resident of Singapore William Farquhar declared null and void in its aftermath.

=== Latin America ===
During his first period in the Foreign Office (1807–1809), Canning became deeply involved in the affairs of Spain, Portugal and Latin America. In his second term of office, he sought to prevent South America from coming into the French sphere of influence, and in this he was successful. He helped guarantee the independence of Brazil and the Spanish colonies, thereby acting in support of the Monroe Doctrine and aiding British merchants to open new markets across South and Central America.

Britain had a strong interest in ensuring the demise of Spanish colonialism, and opening the newly independent Latin American colonies to its trade. The Latin Americans received a certain amount of unofficial aid – arms and volunteers – from outside, but no outside official help at any stage from Britain or any other power. Britain refused to aid Spain and opposed any outside intervention on behalf of Spain by other powers. Royal Navy veterans were a decisive factor in the struggle for independence of certain Latin American countries.

In 1825 Mexico, Argentina and Colombia were recognised by means of the ratification of commercial treaties with Britain. In November 1825 the first minister from a Latin American state, Colombia, was officially received in London. "Spanish America is free," Canning declared, "and if we do not mismanage our affairs she is English ... the New World established and if we do not throw it away, ours." Also in 1825, Portugal recognised Brazil (thanks to Canning's efforts, and in return for a preferential commercial treaty), less than three years after Brazil's declaration of independence.

On 12 December 1826, in the House of Commons, Canning was given an opportunity to defend the policies he had adopted towards France, Spain and Spanish America, and declared: "I resolved that if France had Spain it should not be Spain with the Indies. I called the New World into existence to redress the balance of the Old."

He also prevented the United States from opening trade with the British West Indies.

By granting recognition to Argentina, Colombia, Mexico and Brazil he brought these new states into the European system of trade and diplomacy, while blocking further colonization. Recognition was greeted with enthusiasm throughout Latin America. Canning was the first British foreign secretary to devote a large proportion of his time and energies to the affairs of Latin America (as well as to those of Spain and Portugal) and to foresee the important political and economic role the Latin American states would one day play in the world.

At the Pan-American Centennial Conference of 1926 which took place in Panama City and celebrated the centenary of the South American movement to Independence, it was declared that:

Great Britain lent to the liberty of Spanish America not only the support of its diplomacy, represented by Canning, but also an appreciable contingent of blood and it may be asserted that there was no battlefield in the War of Independence in which British blood was not shed.

In 1826 he was elected a Fellow of the Royal Society.

== Prime minister ==
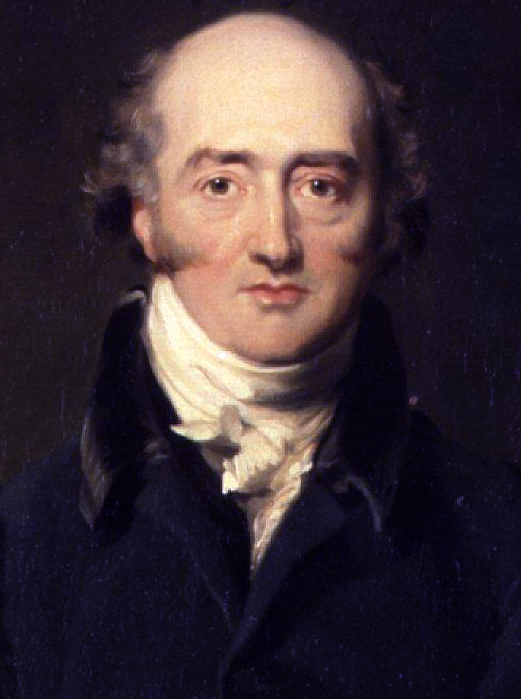
- Premiership of George Canning; 12 April 1827 – 8 August 1827
- Monarch: George IV
- Cabinet: Canning ministry
- Party: Tory
- Seat: 10 Downing Street
- Coat of arms of HM Government

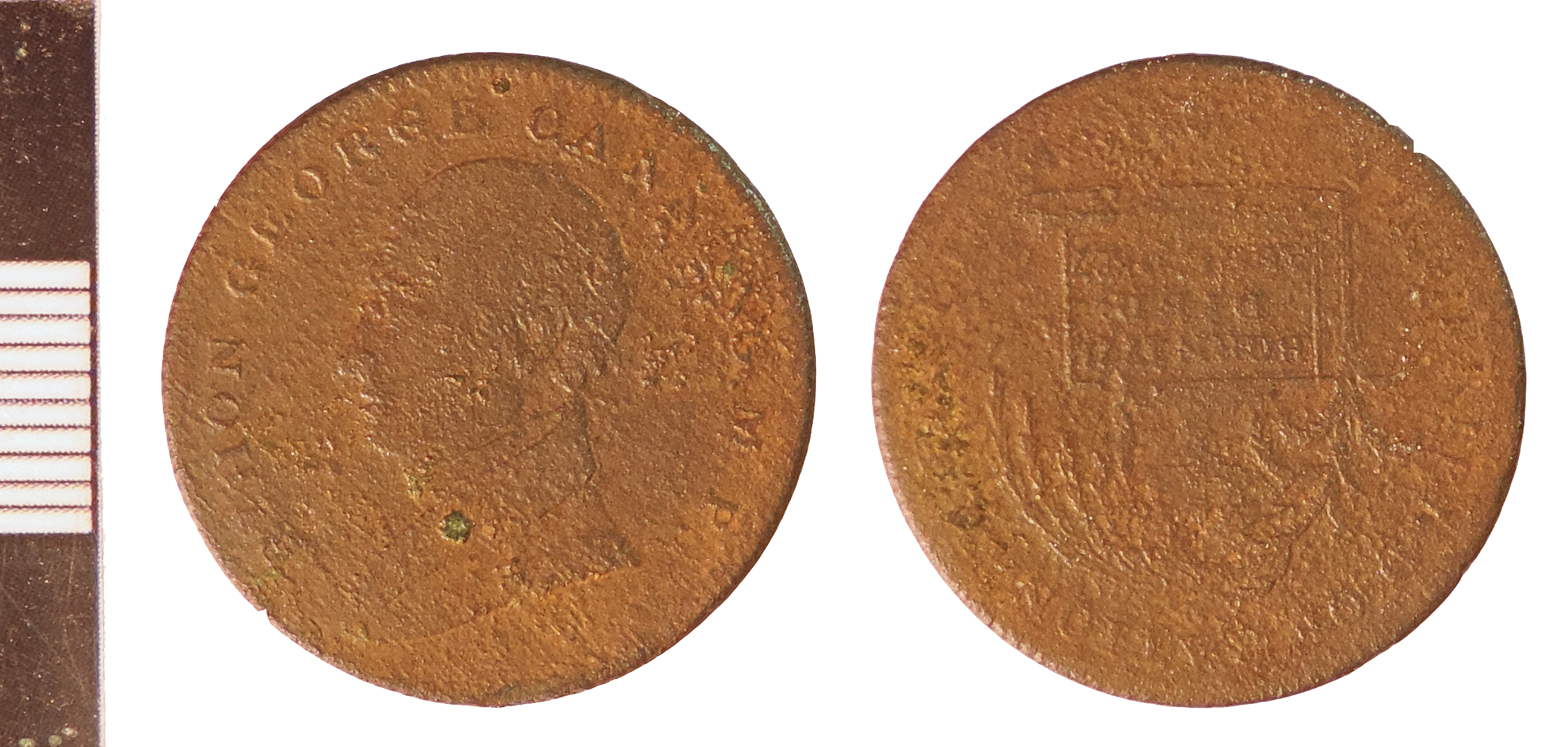
A worn copper-alloy medal depicting Canning

In 1827, Liverpool stood down as prime minister after suffering a severe stroke; he died the following year. Canning, as Liverpool's right-hand man, was chosen by George IV to succeed him, in preference to the Duke of Wellington or Sir Robert Peel. Neither man agreed to serve under Canning, and they were followed by five other members of Liverpool's Cabinet and 40 junior members of the government. The Tory party was now heavily split between the "High Tories" (or "Ultras", nicknamed after the contemporary party in France) and the moderates supporting Canning, often called "Canningites". Consequently, Canning found it difficult to form a government, and chose to invite a number of Whigs to join his Cabinet, including Lord Lansdowne. The government agreed not to discuss the difficult question of parliamentary reform, which Canning opposed but the Whigs supported.

However, Canning's health by this time was in steep decline: at the funeral of Frederick, Duke of York, which was held during a January night at St George's Chapel, Windsor Castle, he became so ill that it was thought he might not recover. He died from tuberculosis later that year, on 8 August 1827, in the room where Charles James Fox had died 21 years earlier. Canning's total period in office was 119 days, the shortest of any prime minister of the United Kingdom who had formed a government until Liz Truss, who was forced to resign after 49 days in 2022. His last words were "Spain and Portugal". Canning is buried in Westminster Abbey.

== Legacy ==
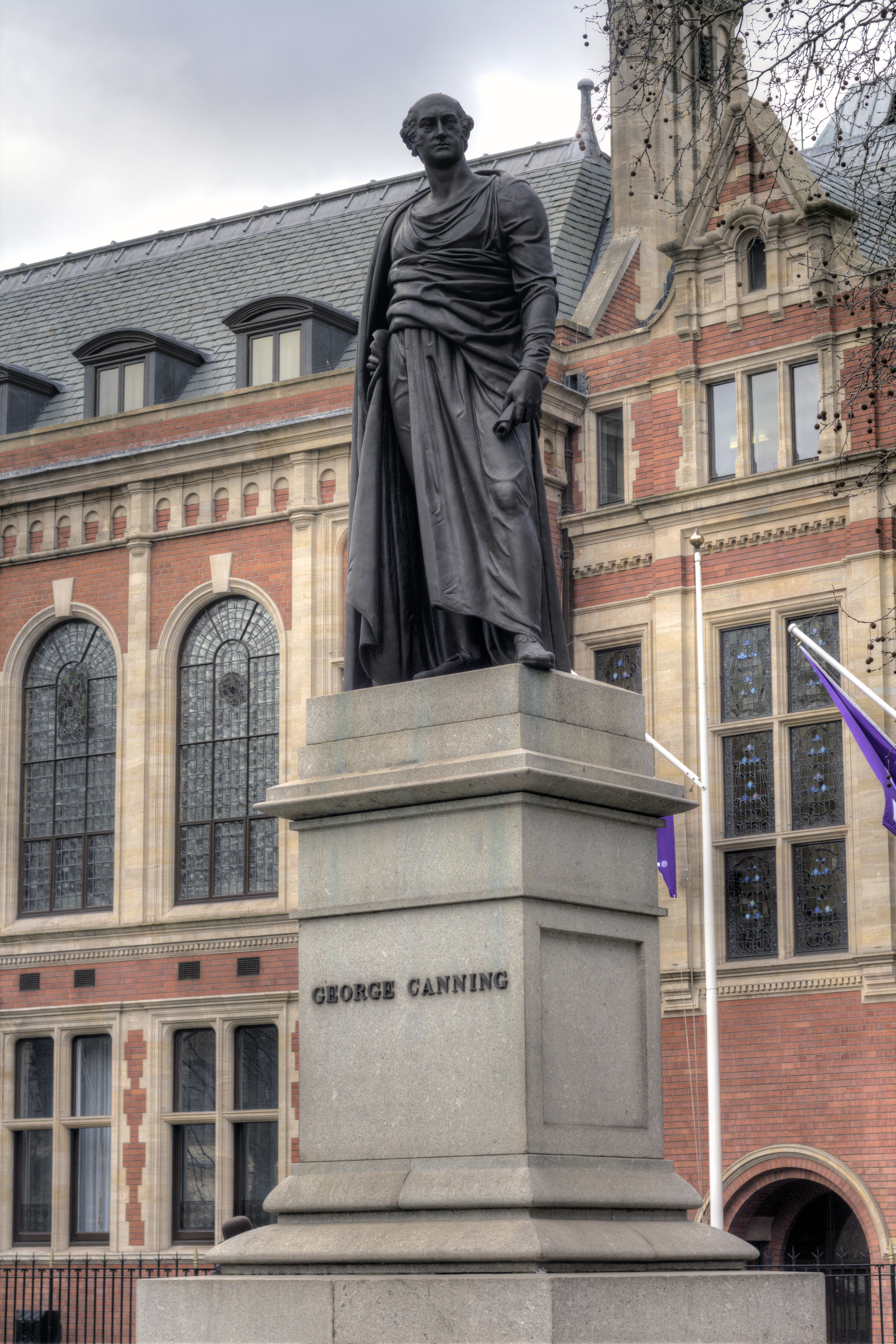
Statue of Canning in Parliament Square, London, by Sir Richard Westmacott. Erected in 1832

Canning has come to be regarded as a "lost leader", with much speculation about what his legacy could have been had he lived. His government of Tories and Whigs continued for a few months under Lord Goderich but fell apart in early 1828. It was succeeded by a government under the Duke of Wellington, which initially included some Canningites but soon became mostly "High Tory" when many of the Canningites drifted over to the Whigs. Wellington's administration was soon defeated. Some historians have seen the revival of the Tories from the 1830s onwards, in the form of the Conservative Party, as the overcoming of the divisions of 1827. What the course of events would have been had Canning lived is highly speculative.

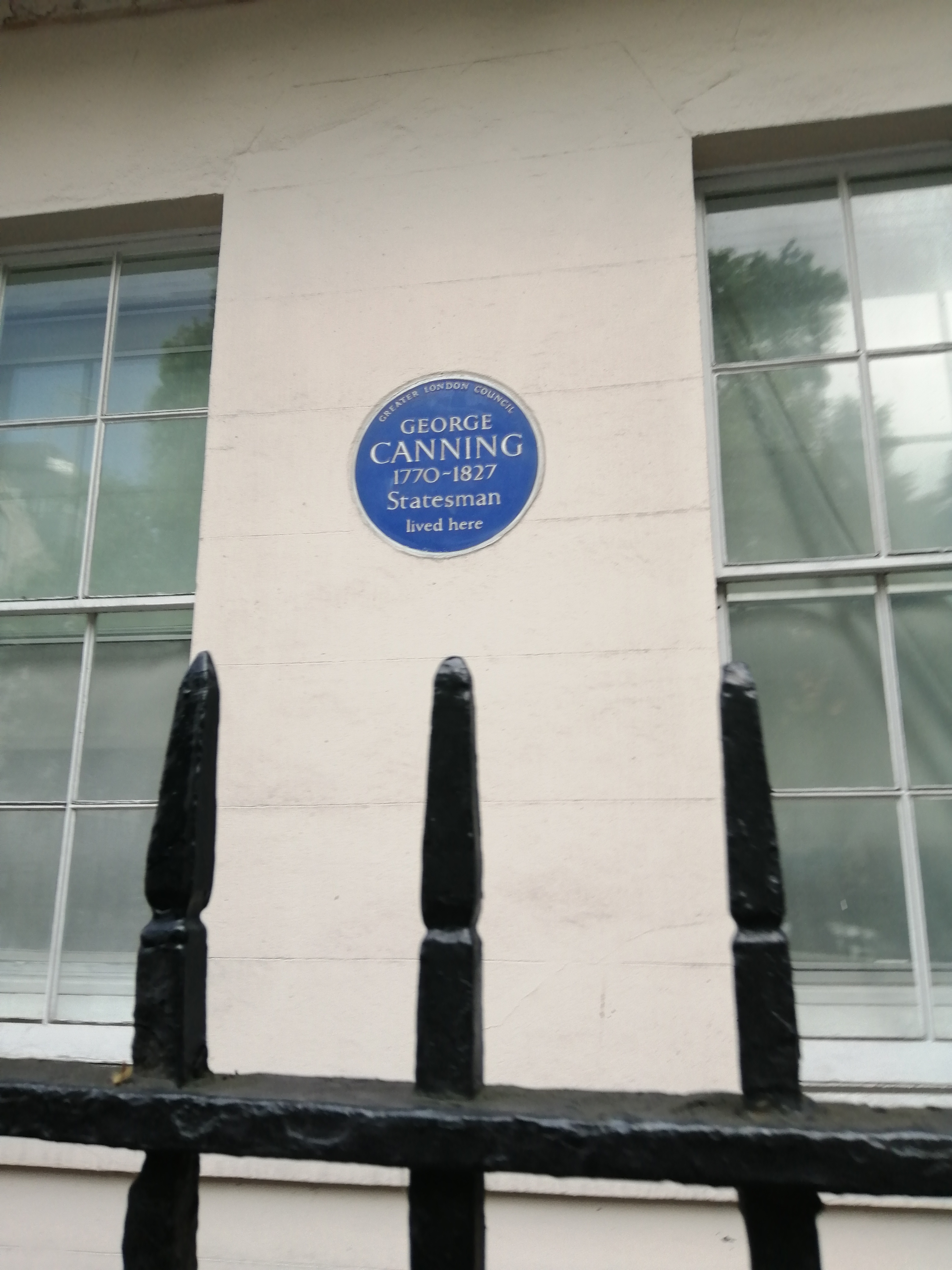
Blue plaque at George Canning's home

Rory Muir has described Canning as "the most brilliant and colourful minister, and certainly the greatest orator in the government at a time when oratory was still politically important. He was a man of biting wit and invective, with immense confidence in his own ability, who often inspired either great friendship or deep dislike and distrust ... he was a passionate, active, committed man who poured his energy into whatever he undertook. This was his strength and also his weakness ... the government's ablest minister". Greville recorded of Canning on the day after his death:

He wrote very fast, but not fast enough for his mind, composing much quicker than he could commit his ideas to paper. He could not bear to dictate, because nobody could write fast enough for him; but on one occasion, when he had gout in his hand and could not write, he stood by the fire and dictated at the same time a despatch on Greek affairs to George Bentinck and one on South American politics to Howard de Walden, each writing as fast as he could, while he turned from one to the other without hesitation or embarrassment.

Canning was the arch-enemy of the Concert of Europe system set up by the conservative powers at the Congress of Vienna in 1815. Hayes says that in terms of foreign affairs:

His most important achievement was the destruction of the system of the neo-Holy Alliance which, if unchallenged, must have dominated Europe. Canning realized it was not enough for Britain to boycott conferences and congresses; it was essential to persuade the Powers that their interests could not be advanced by a system of intervention based upon principles of legitimacy, anti-nationalism and hostility to revolution.

Temperley summarises his policies, which formed the basis of British foreign policy for decades:

non-intervention; no European police system; every nation for itself, and God for us all; balance of power; respect for facts, not for abstract theories; respect for treaty rights, but caution in extending them ... a republic is as good a member of the comity of nations as a monarch. "England not Europe". "Our foreign policy cannot be conducted against the will of the nation." "Europe's domain extends to the shores of the Atlantic, England's begins there."

The Anglo-Dutch Treaty of 1824, negotiated by Canning and Charles Williams-Wynn, is responsible for the borders of the modern nation-states of Singapore, Malaysia and Indonesia.

=== Places named after Canning ===
==== Britain ====
- The Canning Club, a gentlemen's club in central London. Founded in 1911 as the Argentine Club for expatriate businessmen, it was renamed in 1948 as the club extended its remit to the rest of Latin America, in honour of Canning's strong ties to the region. The club currently shares the premises of the Naval and Military Club in St. James's Square.
- Canning House in Belgravia is the seat of the Hispanic and Luso Brazilian Council. It houses a research library and is used for a range of cultural and educational events.
- There are pubs (public houses) named after him. One in Brixton, on the corner of Effra Road and Brixton Water Lane, bore his name until it became the Hobgoblin in the late 1990s and the Hootananny in 2008. Another in Camberwell, on Grove Lane near Denmark Hill station, is still named the George Canning.
- Canning Circus is an area at the top of Zion Hill in Nottingham. Canning Terrace was erected as almshouses and a gatehouse to the adjacent cemetery.
- Canning is a district of Liverpool also known as the Georgian Quarter, and includes Canning Street. Canning Place in Liverpool One was the site of the Liverpool Sailors' Home. Canning Dock and Canning Half Tide Dock on the River Mersey are also named after Canning.
- Canning Street in Belfast is named after George Canning.
- Canning Crescent, Oxford.
- Canning's View, Cliveden.
- Canning Street, Hinckley.

==== Australia ====
- The Canning River in Western Australia, which flows into the Swan River south of Perth. A number of districts on its banks are named after the river, rather than Canning himself; for example Cannington and Canning Vale.
- In Queensland, Canning Creek (the watercourse, the locality and the pastoral run) were all named after him.
- Elsewhere in Australia, there is a street in Carlton North named after him.

==== Canada ====
- The village of Canning in the Annapolis Valley of Nova Scotia
- Cannington, Ontario, is a small village in Brock Township.

==== South America ====
- In Buenos Aires, Argentina, a street has been on-and-off named after Canning since 1893, changing away from the name (to Scalabrini Ortiz) in 1985. A nearby subway station also bore his name from 1930 to 1985 (when it was changed to Malabia). There is also a neighbourhood in southwestern Buenos Aires named after Canning; it began as a station, and today is occupied by many 'country clubs' where richer people live.
- In Montevideo, Uruguay, there is a street named Jorge Canning, the location of the British Residence.
- There is a street named after him in the district of Ipanema, Rio de Janeiro, Brazil.
- In Santiago, Chile, there are two streets named Jorge (Spanish for George) Canning; one in the commune of San Joaquin and a smaller one in the commune of Ñuñoa.

==== Greece ====
- A square in downtown Athens, Greece, is named after Canning (Πλατεία Κάνιγγος, Plateía Kánningos, Canning Square), in appreciation of his supportive stance toward the Greek War of Independence (1821–1830).

==== Places named after other Cannings ====
- Fort Canning, on a hill in Singapore, is actually named after Canning's son Viscount Charles Canning, although many mistakenly believe that it was named after George Canning himself. The hill was previously known simply as Government Hill and earlier as Bukit Larangan (Malay for Forbidden Hill) as it was once the seat for Malay royalty. It was demolished in 1907, but the Fort Canning Bunker was built into the hill before the Second World War, and eventually became a museum.
- Canning Town in London is often thought of as being named after George Canning, but was in fact named after his son Charles Canning, 1st Earl Canning, Governor-General of India during the Indian Mutiny.

== Family ==
Canning married Joan Scott (later 1st Viscountess Canning) (1776–1837) on 8 July 1800, with John Hookham Frere and William Pitt the Younger as witnesses.

George and Joan Canning had four children:

- George Charles Canning (1801–1820), died from consumption
- William Pitt Canning (1802–1828), died from drowning in Madeira, Portugal
- Harriet Canning (1804–1876), married Ulick de Burgh, 1st Marquess of Clanricarde
- Charles John Canning (later 2nd Viscount Canning and 1st Earl Canning) (1812–1862)

== Arms ==
Coat of arms of George Canning
Crest A demi-lion rampant argent charged with three trefoils vert holding in the dexter paw an arrow pheoned and flighted proper shaft or. Escutcheon Argent, three moors' heads couped in profile proper wreathed around the temples of the first and azure. Motto Ne cede malis sed contra (Yield not to adversity, but to the contrary).

== Canning's government, April–August 1827 ==
- George Canning – First Lord of the Treasury, Chancellor of the Exchequer and Leader of the House of Commons
- Lord Lyndhurst – Lord Chancellor
- Lord Harrowby – Lord President of the Council
- The Duke of Portland – Lord Privy Seal
- William Sturges Bourne – Secretary of State for the Home Department
- Lord Dudley – Secretary of State for Foreign Affairs
- Lord Goderich – Secretary of State for War and the Colonies and Leader of the House of Lords
- William Huskisson – President of the Board of Trade and Treasurer of the Navy
- Charles Williams-Wynn – President of the Board of Control
- Lord Bexley – Chancellor of the Duchy of Lancaster
- Lord Palmerston – Secretary at War
- Lord Lansdowne – Minister without Portfolio

Changes

- May 1827 – Lord Carlisle, the First Commissioner of Woods and Forests, enters the Cabinet
- July 1827 – The Duke of Portland becomes a minister without portfolio. Lord Carlisle succeeds him as Lord Privy Seal. W. S. Bourne succeeds Carlisle as First Commissioner of Woods and Forests. Lord Lansdowne succeeds Bourne as home secretary. George Tierney, the Master of the Mint, enters the cabinet.

== See also ==
- British Blue Book
- List of statues and sculptures in Liverpool
- Stratford Canning, 1st Viscount Stratford de Redcliffe his protege

== Notes ==
Political offices
Preceded by Dudley Ryder; Thomas Steele	Paymaster of the Forces; 1800–1801; With: Thomas Steele	Succeeded by Thomas Steele; The Lord Glenbervie
Preceded by George Tierney	Treasurer of the Navy; 1804–1806	Succeeded by Richard Brinsley Sheridan
Preceded by Viscount Howick	Foreign Secretary; 1807–1809	Succeeded by The Earl Bathurst
Preceded by The Earl of Buckinghamshire	President of the Board of Control; 1816–1821	Succeeded by Charles Bathurst
Preceded by The Marquess of Londonderry	Foreign Secretary; 1822–1827	Succeeded by The Viscount Dudley and Ward
Preceded by The Marquess of Londonderry	Leader of the House of Commons; 1822–1827	Succeeded by William Huskisson
Preceded by The Earl of Liverpool	Prime Minister of the United Kingdom; 1827	Succeeded by The Viscount Goderich
Preceded by Frederick John Robinson	Chancellor of the Exchequer; 1827	Succeeded by John Charles Herries
Parliament of Great Britain
Preceded by Sir John Barrington, Bt; Sir Richard Worsley	Member of Parliament for Newtown (Isle of Wight); 1793–1796; With: Sir John Barrington, Bt	Succeeded by Sir Richard Worsley; Charles Shaw Lefevre
Preceded by John Barker Church; Hugh Seymour-Conway	Member of Parliament for Wendover; 1796–1801; With: John Hiley Addington	Succeeded by Parliament of the United Kingdom
Parliament of the United Kingdom
Preceded by Parliament of Great Britain	Member of Parliament for Wendover; 1801–1802; With: John Hiley Addington	Succeeded by Charles Long; John Smith
Preceded by Arthur Moore	Member of Parliament for Tralee; 1802–1806	Succeeded by Maurice FitzGerald
Preceded by Sir Robert Barclay, Bt; James Paull	Member of Parliament for Newtown (Isle of Wight); 1806–1807; With: Sir Robert Barclay, Bt	Succeeded by Barrington Pope Blachford; Dudley Long North
Preceded by Sir William Fowle Middleton, Bt; Sir John Nicholl	Member of Parliament for Hastings; 1807–1812; With: Sir Abraham Hume, Bt	Succeeded by Sir Abraham Hume, Bt; James Dawkins
Preceded by Hylton Jolliffe; Booth Grey	Member of Parliament for Petersfield; 1812; With: Hylton Jolliffe	Succeeded by Hylton Jolliffe; George Canning
Preceded by Isaac Gascoyne; Banastre Tarleton	Member of Parliament for Liverpool; 1812–1823; With: Isaac Gascoyne	Succeeded by Isaac Gascoyne; William Huskisson
Preceded by Nicholas Vansittart; Charles Bathurst	Member of Parliament for Harwich; 1823–1826; With: John Charles Herries	Succeeded by John Charles Herries; Nicholas Conyngham Tindal
Preceded by Charles Duncombe; John Stuart	Member of Parliament for Newport (Isle of Wight); 1826–1827; With: William Henry John Scott	Succeeded by William Henry John Scott; Hon. William Lamb
Preceded by John Fitzgerald; Augustus Frederick Ellis	Member of Parliament for Seaford; 1827; With: John Fitzgerald	Succeeded by John Fitzgerald; Augustus Frederick Ellis
