= 108th Regiment of Foot (1761) =

Infantry regiment of the British Army

The 108th Regiment of Foot was an infantry regiment of the British Army from 1761 to 1763. It was raised in October 1761 from a cadre of the 31st Regiment of Foot, and was disbanded in 1763.

== Regimental colonels ==
Regimental colonels were:

- 1761–1762: Lt-Col. Patrick M'Douall
- 1762: Sir Robert Hamilton, 4th Baronet of Silvertonhill
- 1762–1763: Maj-Gen. John Scott
