= General Service Enlistment Act =

Indian law

The General Service Enlistment Act was a general order issued by the Government of India on 25 July 1856.

It required every soldier enlisting in the Bengali Army from that point forward to go overseas for deployment if required. The order was brought just before the Anglo-Persian War. The British were reluctant to send a force overland to Herat since they were reminiscent of the disasters of the First Anglo-Afghan War. Instead, the Government of India decided to launch a maritime expeditionary force to attack the general area of Bushehr, the primary port of entry to Persia at the time.

For that reason, Lord Canning, the Governor-General of India, decided to pass the act that forced deployment literally overseas, as he was aware of the resistance he would face because of the kala pani taboo. It was thus one of the main causes for the Indian Rebellion of 1857.
