= Bassetlaw Wapentake =

Former division of Northamptonshire, England

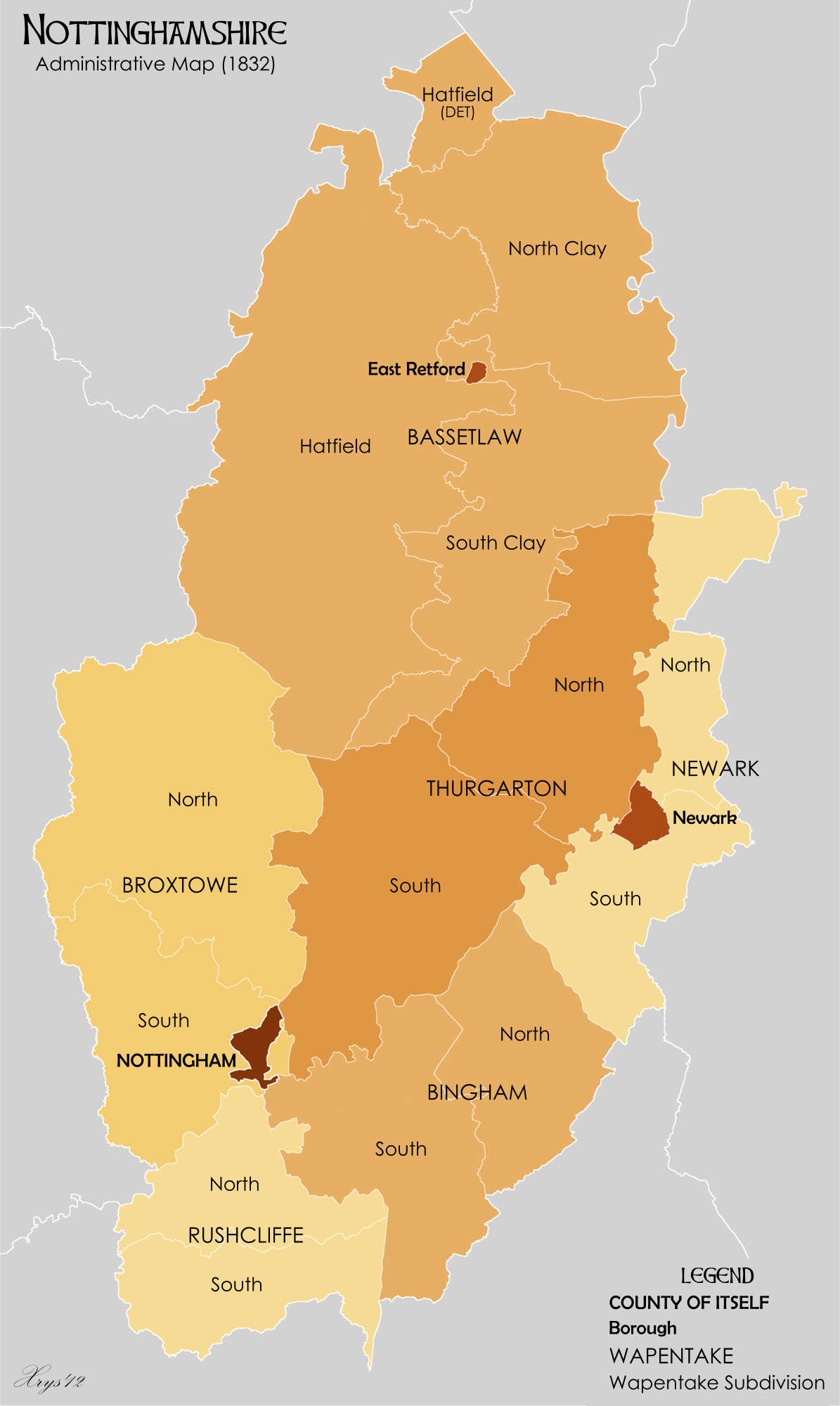
Map showing the Bassetlaw wapentake

Bassetlaw was a wapentake (equivalent to a hundred) in the English county of Nottinghamshire. The wapentake covered an area in the north of the county, roughly equivalent to the modern Bassetlaw local government district. The wapentake was divided into the divisions of Hatfield, North Clay and South Clay.

The place name Bassetlaw means the hill of the people of Bersa. Bersa was an early Anglo-Saxon leader who settled in the area.

The chief town in the hundred was East Retford. Other towns were Tuxford, Worksop and Ollerton (the latter of which is in the modern Newark and Sherwood district).

The original meeting place of the wapentake was Blyth Low Hill, while another moot place was an enclosure at East Markham. At some point between 1610 and 1719, it absorbed the Oswaldbeck wapentake, which became the North Clay division. This may originally have met at an enclosure at Gringley-on-the-Hill.

== Parishes ==
The following ancient parishes were included in the wapentake:

- Askham
- Babworth, Beckingham, Bevercotes, Bilsthorpe, Blyth (part) (Barnby Moor, Hodsock, Ranskill, Styrrup, Torworth), Bole, Bothamsall, Boughton
- Carlton in Lindrick
- Clarborough, Clayworth (including Wiseton)
- Darlton, Dunham
- Eakring, Eaton, East Drayton, East Markham, East Retford, Edwinstowe (including Budby, Carburton, Clipstone, Ollerton, Perlethorpe), Egmanton, Elkesley, Everton (including Scaftworth)
- Part of Finningley (Auckley)
- Gamston, Gringley on the Hill, Grove
- Habblesthorpe, Harworth, Haughton, Hayton, Headon cum Upton
- Kirton, Kneesall (part) (Ompton)
- Laneham, Laxton, Littleborough
- Mattersey, Misson, Misterton (including West Stockwith)
- North Wheatley, Norton Cuckney (including Cuckney, Holbeck, Nether Langwith, Norton), North Leverton
- Ordsall
- Ragnall, Rampton, Rufford (extra-parochial)
- Saundby, Scrooby, South Leverton (including Cottam), South Wheatley, Stokeham, Sturton le Steeple, Sutton cum Lound
- Treswell, Tuxford
- Walesby, Walkeringham, Wallingwells (extra-parochial), Warsop (including Sookholme), Welbeck (extra-parochial), Wellow
- West Burton, West Drayton, West Markham, West Retford, Woodhouse Hall (extra-parochial), Worksop
