= Norton, Cuckney, Holbeck and Welbeck =

Coordinates: 53.249°N 1.153°W

- Civil parish
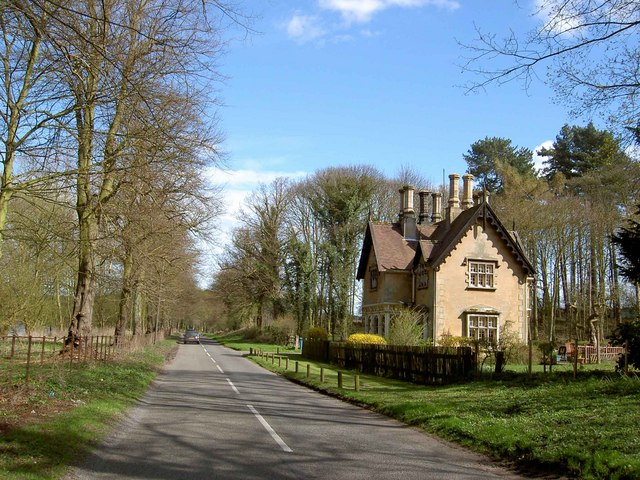
- Welbeck Estate House

- Location within Nottinghamshire
- Interactive map of Norton, Cuckney, Holbeck and Welbeck
- Area: 11.13 sq mi (28.8 km^{2})
- Population: 530 (2021)
  - Density: 48/sq mi (19/km^{2})
- Created: 2023
- OS grid reference: SK 564732
  - London: 120 mi (190 km) SE
- District: Bassetlaw
- Shire county: Nottinghamshire
- Region: East Midlands
- Country: England
- Sovereign state: United Kingdom
- Settlements: Cuckney: Holbeck; Holbeck Woodhouse; Norton; Welbeck
- Post town: WORKSOP
- Postcode district: S80
- Dialling code: 01623 / 01909
- Police: Nottinghamshire
- Fire: Nottinghamshire
- Ambulance: East Midlands
- UK Parliament: Bassetlaw
- Website: nortoncuckneyholbeckwelbeckparishcouncil.gov.uk

Norton, Cuckney, Holbeck and Welbeck is a civil parish in the Bassetlaw district of Nottinghamshire, England.

The Norton and Cuckney, and the Holbeck and Welbeck parishes ceased to exist on 31 March 2023 (2 years ago), after which they were merged into the present entity.

At the time of the 2011 census, the total population of the then independent civil parishes was 550, and this dropped to 530 in the 2021 census.

== Profile ==
The parish lies within northern Nottinghamshire and contains a number of areas and villages.

=== Cuckney ===
Cuckney is a village to the south west of the parish, lying where the A60 and the A616 roads meet midway between Worksop and Mansfield. It rests at the foot of Cuckney Hill, close to the Welbeck estate, the ducal seat for the Dukes of Portland. St Mary's Church, Norton Cuckney was established in Norman times, and is adjacent to the site of the ancient Cuckney Castle, a 12th-century motte and bailey fortification. Close to the church is the Greendale Oak Inn, named after an oak tree through which a hole was reputedly cut for the first Duke of Portland to drive through with a coach and horses to win a bet.

=== Norton ===
Norton is located less than a mile to the north east of Cuckney, and is central south of the parish. Norton is a linear settlement on an old packhorse trail from Mansfield to Worksop. Norton formerly was once a bustling resting place, with three public houses and a brewery. In time, its importance lessened as turnpikes and eventually modern A roads moved it away from key routes, with it becoming a quiet village, although in recent times it can be a peak time alternative route to key trunk roads.

=== Welbeck ===
Welbeck village comprises its Abbey, Welbeck Woodhouse, a number of lodges, associated stable blocks and estate residences. The Abbey came into the ownership of the Portland family in the 17th century, the current building is Grade I listed with its formal grounds designated a Grade II Registered park and garden. Welbeck Estates, the local main landowner has established an award-winning art gallery, farm shop, brewery and bakery, attracting visitors and providing services for residents. Newer buildings and the refurbishment and use of existing estate buildings has formed an industrial hub with 50 small businesses operating from the village.

=== Holbeck ===
Holbeck is a sizeable area, yet thinly populated, containing hamlets such as Woodhouse. Holbeck is historically connected to Welbeck, having been purchased by the Duke of Portland from Earl Manvers in 1810.

== History ==
=== Welbeck ===
The Welbeck Estate is around 23 square miles (60 km^{2}; 6,000 ha), and within the parish it covers approximately 11 square miles (28 km^{2}; 2,800 ha), taking up the vast majority of owned land. Within the centre of the Welbeck Estate is Welbeck Abbey, which is a Grade I listed building, privately owned from 1608, and was a former residence of the Dukes of Portland. It is surrounded by a Registered Park which is Grade II listed (which was created in 1748), along with Welbeck Village, which is a grouping of ancillary buildings of high conservation and architectural value (Grade I and II listed). A portion of Welbeck was used by an educational facility of the British Army for many years until their withdrawal in 2005.

After the Ministry of Defence vacated in 2005, Welbeck Estates redeveloped the central core of buildings to cater to business and retail use. The Harley Art Gallery is now a tourist destination that was expanded in 2016. It is complemented by the Welbeck Farm Shop, a bakery, a craft school, coffee shop and brewery. The wider estate also incorporates a deer park, lakes, ancient woodlands and forestry, farmland and grazing. Towards the southern boundary of the parish area is the site of the former Welbeck Colliery, which closed in 2010, and there are plans to regenerate this area for a range of employment and residential uses. Welbeck remains a working estate owning the large majority of residential properties in the villages of Cuckney, Norton, Holbeck and Welbeck, the home farm, local tenant farms and commercial and industrial premises. Much of the areas used as playing fields, parks and open spaces are also held by Welbeck Estates, with leases or informal arrangements in place to allow their use by locals.

=== Cuckney ===
There have been Important routes of communication north and south through Cuckney from very early times. There is some evidence of a battle in 632AD near St Mary's Church. The existing church was built in the 12th century. There is archaeological evidence of a motte and bailey castle in the area until about 1148. The River Poulter flows through Cuckney and Norton from west to east. In the 1800s there was a cotton mill and corn mill. The cotton mill was since redeveloped to be the primary school. Close to the school is a mill dam and dam meadow. The meadow is an area of wetland, and is designated a local wildlife site. It has the old mill stream running through it to a weir. The dam and meadow encourage river and wetland birds to thrive all year round. Cuckney facilities and services include the aforementioned church, pub, primary school with sports hall, cricket ground and village hall. Only 5 residences have been built in the last 40 years until the 2020s.

=== Holbeck ===
The hamlet was not recorded in Domesday Book and there is no documentary evidence of an early church or chapel. in 1329 it had ecclesiastical connections to John Hotham, Bishop of Ely, who held free warren there as well as 114 acres. Also in that year, the bishop of Ely granted the whole manor of Cuckney and its hamlets, including Holbeck, to Welbeck Abbey. Following the English Reformation parts were separated and Holbeck became the property of Earl Manvers. In 1810 it, along with Bonbusk (a local hamlet) was transferred to the Duke of Portland, in exchange for Bilhaugh Wood near Thoresby Park. In 1844 an oratory for Catholics was at Holbeck Woodhouse and it had been converted into a Protestant chapel by the Duke. The church of St Winifred was built between 1913 and 1916, being originally a private chapel in the Church of England and was a traditional burial place for the dukes, it was built entirely by labour from the estate.

Holbeck Woodhouse and Holbeck village contain clusters of farm buildings and houses which served the Welbeck estate, along with the land and buildings associated to the former abbey. Several of the houses are listed, as well as is the Portland family church of St Winifred, built in the early 20th century. There are seven bungalows in Holbeck Woodhouse which attract interest when they on occasion become available. No new housing developments had taken place within Holbeck for 40 plus years until the conversion of the barns at Holbeck Woodhouse in 2020 has brought five dwellings onto the market, although the Welbeck estates chose to make these holiday lets rather than residential. Holbeck includes the location of former stable buildings and houses for tenants of the estate, with much of these being listed due to their notable architectural style. Lady Margaret Hall is located off the A60. This is the largest of the local community buildings and has recently been refurbished. The playing field at Holbeck is leased to Bassetlaw District Council.

=== Norton ===
Norton came under the same parallel ownership and history as Cuckney, which was considered the chief local town by the 1800s. It later developed Welbeck estate workers houses and farm buildings. The village has since had ten buildings designated as listed. In Norton during World War Two, a prisoner of war camp in woods to the north of the village was built. Eleven bungalows in Norton built in 1962 by Welbeck Estates and since quickly attract interest when one occasionally becomes available. The small play area at Norton and playing field at Holbeck are leased to Bassetlaw District Council.

=== Welbeck Colliery ===
Welbeck Colliery opened in 1912 and closed in 2010, it employed 1500 workers at its peak and extracted 1.5 million tonnes of coal per year.

== Governance ==
The villages and rural parish area, these were managed at the first level of public administration by Norton, Cuckney, Holbeck and Welbeck Parish Council.

At district level, the wider area is managed by Bassetlaw District Council, and by Nottinghamshire County Council at its highest tier.

== Landmarks ==
=== Listed buildings ===
Over 90 buildings and structures throughout the parish are listed as features of historical interest. The key buildings are Welbeck Abbey, the country house for the estate and St Mary's Church, both listed at Grade I. Other notable structures include buildings in the gardens or grounds of the abbey. a school, a dam, a public house, a number of lodges, church lychgate and monuments.

=== Tourism ===
Welbeck Abbey has facilities for seasonal visitors, there is also a nearby art gallery and garden centre on the estate. The Robin Hood Way path passes through the villages of Norton, Holbeck and Holbeck Woodhouse before crossing the Shrubbery Lake just north of the abbey.

== Religious sites ==
There are three Anglican places of worship in the area, the Church of England parish church of St Mary at Cuckney was built in the 12th century. St Winifred's Church in Holbeck was built in the 20th century, there is a chapel at Welbeck Abbey.
