= Welbeck (Bassetlaw electoral ward) =

- Electoral ward
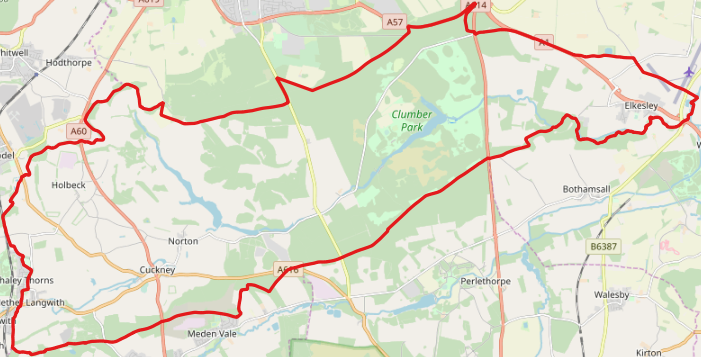
- Electorate: 1,531 (2019)
- District: Bassetlaw
- Region: East Midlands
- Country: England
- Sovereign state: United Kingdom
- Postcode district: S80
- Postcode district: NG20
- UK Parliament: Bassetlaw
- Councillors: 1

Welbeck is an electoral ward in the district of Bassetlaw. The ward elects one councillor to Bassetlaw District Council using the first past the post electoral system for a four-year term in office. The number of registered voters in the ward is 1,531 as of 2019.

It consists of the villages of Elkesley, Hardwick (within the parish of Clumber and Hardwick which also includes Clumber Park), Carburton, Norton, Cuckney, Holbeck, Nether Langwith and Welbeck.

The ward was created in 1979 following a review of ward boundaries in Bassetlaw by the Local Government Boundary Commission for England. A subsequent review of electoral arrangements in 2002 resulted in minor changes to the boundaries of the ward.

== Councillors ==
Interactive map of ward boundaries.

The ward elects one councillor every four years. Prior to 2015, Bassetlaw District Council was elected by thirds with elections taking place every year except the year in which elections to Nottinghamshire County Council took place.

Election	Councillor
1979	Mary Stokes (Conservative)
1983	Mary Stokes (Conservative)
1987	Mary Stokes (Conservative)
1991	Mary Stokes (Conservative)
1995	Mary Stokes (Conservative)
1999	Mary Stokes (Conservative)
2002	Mary Stokes (Conservative)
2003	Mary Stokes (Conservative)
2007	Mary Stokes (Conservative)
2011	Pat Douglas (Labour)
2015	Kevin Dukes (Labour)
2019	Kevin Dukes (Labour)
2023	Charles Adams (Labour)

== Elections ==
=== 2023 ===
Welbeck (1)
Party	Candidate	Votes	%	±%
Labour	Charles Adams	335	55.6%	▼4.7%
Conservative	Matthew Evans	241	40.0%	▲0.3%
Liberal Democrats	Steffi Harangozo	27	4.5%	NEW
Turnout		609	40.5%	
Labour hold		Swing		

=== 2019 ===
Welbeck (1) 2 May 2019
Party	Candidate	Votes	%	±%
Labour	Kevin Dukes*	324	60.3%	▲13.1
Conservative	Matthew Evans	213	39.7%	▼4.1
Turnout		563	36.8%	
Labour hold		Swing		

=== 2015 ===
Welbeck (1) 7 May 2015
Party	Candidate	Votes	%	±%
Labour	Kevin Dukes	479	47.2%	
Conservative	Julian Watts	445	43.8%	
Liberal Democrats	Helen Cooper	91	9.0%	
Turnout			67.3%	
Labour hold		Swing		

=== 2011 ===
Welbeck (1) 5 May 2011
Party	Candidate	Votes	%	±%
Labour	Pat Douglas	457	57.6%	
Conservative	Mary Stokes	337	42.4%	
Turnout		794	51.3%	

=== 2007 ===
Welbeck (1) 3 May 2007
Party	Candidate	Votes	%	±%
Conservative	Mary Stokes	401	59.1%	
Labour	Robin Carrington-Wilde	277	40.9%	
Turnout		678	41.1%	

=== 2003 ===
Welbeck (1) 1 May 2003
Party	Candidate	Votes	%	±%
Conservative	Mary Stokes	377	58.6%	
Labour	Robert Payne	266	41.4%	
Turnout		643	39.6%	
