= Norton and Cuckney =

- Civil parish
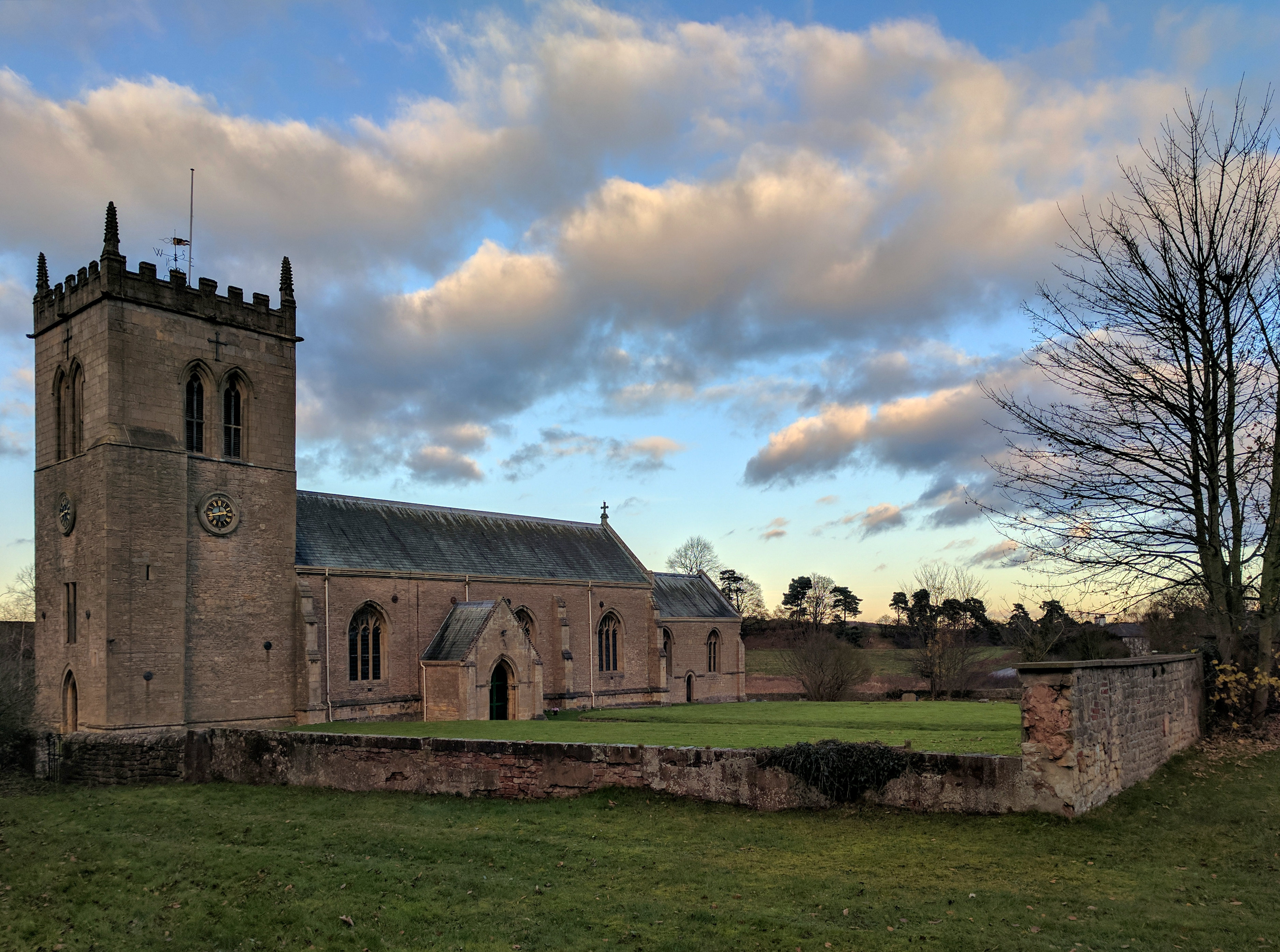
- St Mary's, Cuckney
- Interactive map of Norton and Cuckney
- Coordinates: 53.239°N 1.152°W
- Country: England
- Parish: Norton, Cuckney, Holbeck and Welbeck
- Primary council: Bassetlaw
- County: Nottinghamshire
- Region: East Midlands
- Status: Parish
- Main settlements: Norton, Cuckney

Government
  - Type: Parish Council
  - UK Parliament: Bassetlaw

Area
  - Total: 4.26 sq mi (11.03 km^{2})

Population (2011)
  - Total: 351
  - Density: 82.4/sq mi (31.8/km^{2})

Map

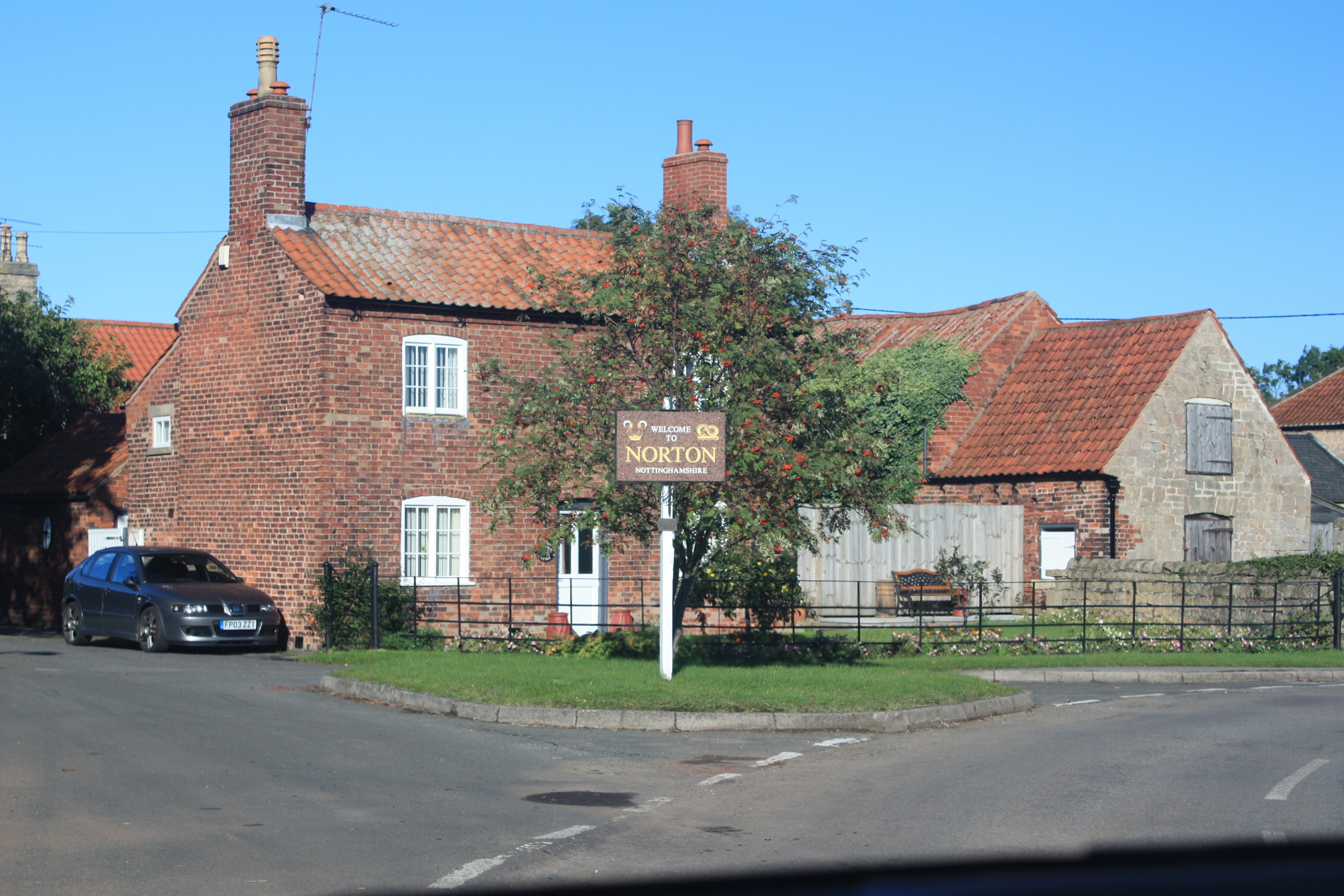
Norton village green

Norton and Cuckney is a former civil parish, now in the parish of Norton, Cuckney, Holbeck and Welbeck, in the Bassetlaw district, within the county of Nottinghamshire, England. The overall area had a population of 351 at the 2011 census. The parish lay in the north west of the county, and south west within the district. The parish lies close to the county border with Derbyshire. It is 125 miles north west of London, 20 miles north of the city of Nottingham, and 5 miles north of the market town of Mansfield. The area was bordering Sherwood Forest and has associations with mining interests and the Welbeck Estate.

== Toponymy ==
Cuckney was Cuchenai at the time of Domesday, and is possibly derived from the Old English for "The fast running stream, or brook" which is nearby.

Norton was "The north town, or habitation" or "North farm", considering it lay above Cuckney.

The previously independent parishes were merged in April 2015.

== Geography ==
=== Location ===
The parish lay along the north east boundary of the Nottinghamshire and by the Lincolnshire border.

It was surrounded by the following local areas:

- Welbeck and Worksop to the north
- Church Warsop and Meden Vale to the south
- Budby and Carburton to the east
- Holbeck, Whaley Thorns and Nether Langwith to the west.

=== Settlements ===
The parish consisted of two settlements, being estate villages affiliated to Welbeck Abbey:

- Cuckney
- Norton

==== Cuckney ====
This is the larger village in the area. It is located in the centre left of the parish. Cuckney lies where the A60 and the A616 roads meet about halfway between Worksop and Mansfield. The historic village sits at the foot of Cuckney Hill, close to the Welbeck Estate, the seat of the Dukes of Portland. The Church of St Mary's has its origins in Norman times, and sits adjacent to the site of the ancient Cuckney Castle, a 12th-century motte and bailey fortress.

==== Norton ====
Norton is situated three quarters of a mile to the north east of Cuckney, near the northern boundary of the parish. It is a linear settlement on the old packhorse trail from Mansfield to Worksop. Property boundaries are generally very attractive, including stone walls, green verges and estate fencing. The small village green at the corner of Carburton Road is a focal point. Architectural interest, in terms of form, detailing and materials is strong throughout the settlement and the layout and form of buildings ensures that there is a unified historic character.

=== Landscape ===
Predominantly, many of the parish residents were clustered around the villages. Outside of these is a scattering of farms, farmhouses and cottages amongst a wider rural setting. There are several lodges affiliated to the Welbeck Estate dotted throughout, mainly alongside the lake area. Some substantial wooded areas exist to the north (part of Welbeck Park), south and particularly east of the parish, primarily alongside the A616 Sheffield-Ollerton-Newark road, these are close to or considered part of Budby North Forest and the wider Sherwood Forest.

==== Water features ====
- The River Poulter runs through the parish, passing alongside both villages
- Welbeck Great Lake lies along the north border
- Cuckney Dam lies along the river south of the village, by the Mill
- Carburton Dam lies along the Great Lake area of the river.

==== Land elevation ====
The parish was relatively low-lying. The land height ranges from 45 metres (148 ft) in the north of the parish by the Great Lake region, and rises towards the villages and beyond. The peak of the parish was at Cuckney Hill on the south boundary of the parish, at 100 metres (330 ft).

== Governance ==
Although discrete settlements, these are managed at the first level of public administration by Norton, Cuckney, Holbeck and Welbeck Parish Council.

At district level, the wider area is managed by Bassetlaw District Council, and by Nottinghamshire County Council at its highest tier.

== History ==
The two settlements being so close together have had a shared existence through the ages, and in more recent centuries, ownership. The wider area was an ancient parish until 1866 called Norton Cuckney. It extended eastward from Creswell Crags, in Derbyshire, to near Thoresby Park, and was bounded on the north by Welbeck, and on the south by Church Warsop. It was divided into four townships - Holbeck, Langwith, Cuckney and Norton (Cuckney). These were split into separate parishes and remained as this until 1 April 2015 when the last two were combined into Norton and Cuckney. On 1 April 2023 Norton and Cuckney was abolished and merged with Holbeck and Welbeck to form "Norton, Cuckney, Holbeck and Welbeck".

=== Cuckney ===
Important routes north and south have run through Cuckney from very early times. There is evidence to suggest that there was a battle in 632AD near the site of St Mary's Church. The existing church dates back to 12th century. There is evidence of the motte and bailey Cuckney Castle by the church which existed until about 1148.

Cuckney was held by Sweyn II the Saxon, but after the Norman Conquest it was given to Hugh Fitz-Baldrick and Joceus de Flemaugh, except two carucates, which Gamelbere, an old Saxon knight, was allowed to retain for the service of shoeing the King's palfrey, "as oft as he should lie at his manor of Mansfield." A great part of this parish was given by Sir Henry de Fawkenburg and others to the monks of Welbeck, which at the dissolution of monasteries was sold to Sir George Pierpont, but Earl Bathurst was lord of the manor and principal owner in the Cuckney township till 1844.

Primarily agricultural until the start of the Industrial Revolution, by the 1800s there were 2 mills in operation; a cotton mill and a corn mill. The Sitwell family of Renishaw relocated their iron forge from Carburton to the mill west of the village but the real expansion came with William Toplis from Wirksworth. Toplis had become well known as a textiles merchant in Mansfield from the 1780s and was looking to develop the business, and leased 18 acres of land from Earl Bathurst In 1785. His family built the mill, and converted the furnace previously used by Sitwell Iron Forge into machinery needed for the mill.

Some housing was purpose built for the mill and given local names. Opposite the school, is the Apprentices’ House (now renamed the School Cottages) which housed orphan boys and girls used as labour. They could be as young as six years old and were brought from the Foundling Hospital in London. Further into the village are Bakers Row, Maltkiln Row which was “back to back” housing, and another block known as Ten Row - these held adult workers and their families.

The school was rewired for electricity In the 1950s and the original apprentices register was found in the roof, which recorded all the children who had worked in the mill. Many present-day locals in the village can trace their family history back to these. Between 1786 and 1805, up to 780 foundling children were recorded as having worked there. In 1805 the Worsted Mill was advertised for sale. It was purchased by William Hollins & Sons who had mills at Pleasley Vale and Langwith, and they spun cotton. Hollins became well known for developing Viyella textiles.

On 12 July 1844 the mill was closed, the machinery sold and this caused unemployment and hard times to families in the area. The then Marquis of Titchfield, later becoming the 5th Duke of Portland, purchased much of Cuckney from Earl Bathurst. The Duke was keen to provide education locally and so converted the mill into a school, it opened in 1846 catering for nearly 200 pupils. The Duke and descendants of the family continue to have large landholdings in the area as part of the wider Welbeck Estate since then.

Cuckney Village Hall is a wooden framed, tin clad building, and was originally the church at Holbeck, but moved to Cuckney in the 1920s. It occupies a central site next to St Marys Church.

The Hatfield Plantation forested area is immediately north of the Welbeck Colliery site. It presently is a tree plantation but previously it was an ammunition store for use during World War II.

=== Norton ===
Norton once boasted three public houses, and there may have been a brewhouse that serviced some of the other pubs and may have dispensed drinks to customers, called the “Tivitania” which later became the Doctor's house and surgery, until being converted into a private residence called, “Norton House” around the 1960s.

“The Horse Tiresias” public house was named after a prize Welbeck Estates racehorse from the early 19th century. It was aimed at the wealthy, whilst their servants and horses were housed at the Packhorse Inn about 100 metres away

The main road through the village was moved to its current position as the A60 at the request of the 5th Duke of Portland leaving Norton as a quiet area, but in more recent times it has become an alternative route via Clumber Park to the A1 trunk route.

During World War II there was a prisoner of war camp in woods to the north of the village. It was known as PoW camp 174, but very little remains except for foundations of buildings and hard standings.

There are eight bungalows on Lady Margaret Crescent, as well as three opposite. These were built by Welbeck Estates to house retired workers in 1962.

=== Milnthorpe ===
This was reported in the middle 1800s as a small hamlet ¼ mile east of Norton, but relatively little remains, except for Milnthorpe Lodge which is linked to the Welbeck estate and was built around 1860, which is now a listed building.

=== Welbeck Colliery ===
The former Welbeck Colliery site is by the south boundary of the parish, where it meets the Mansfield district boundary. It opened in 1912 and closed in 2010. At its peak it employed 1,500 workers and extracted 1.5 million tonnes of coal per year.

== Education ==
There is a primary school at Cuckney, housed at the old cotton mill by the River Poulter dam to the west of the village.

== Religion ==
There is one church in Cuckney village, the Church of England parish church of St Mary's. It was built in the 12th century, and restored in 1907.

== Landmarks ==
A county wide long-distance walking path, the Robin Hood Way passes through the northern area and Norton village, and runs along the east border of the parish.

=== Listed buildings and locations ===
Over 40 buildings and structures throughout the parish are listed as features of historical interest, including:

- St Mary's Church in Cuckney (Grade I)
- A monument to Lord George Bentinck near Norton (Grade II)
- A dam by Cuckney Mill (Grade II)

The remains of the motte and bailey Cuckney Castle, by St Mary's Church is registered as a scheduled monument.

=== Village designations ===
Both Norton and Cuckney have district council defined conservation areas.

== Sport ==
Cuckney Cricket Club maintain a local facility built in 2002. It provides 3 indoor cricket lanes as well as rooms of various sizes that can be used for community activities.
