= Cuckney Hill =

Hill in Nottinghamshire, England

Coordinates: 53.221°N 1.153°W

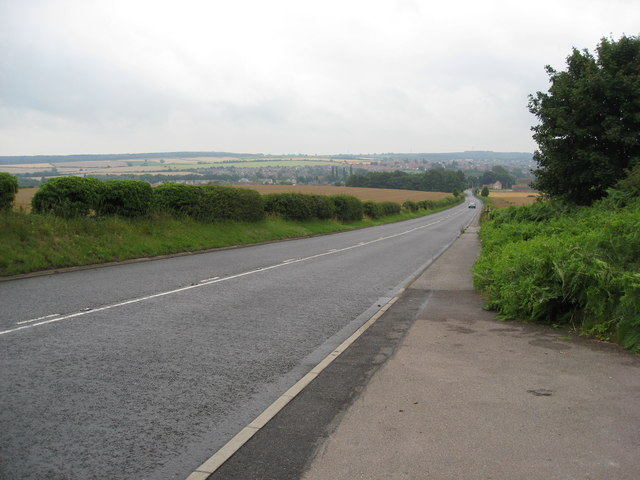
Looking down the A60 road on Cuckney Hill towards Church Warsop

Cuckney Hill is a hill that in England that lies between the village of Cuckney and the village of Church Warsop. In the late 19th century, Cuckney Hill was considered one of the chief points in the range between Worksop and Nottingham. It has been described as an accident blackspot.

== Description ==
Cuckney Hill lies between the village of Cuckney and the village of Church Warsop, in Nottinghamshire, East Midlands, England. The A60 road crosses it.

Cuckney Hill is partly farmland and partly woods. Locals now ironically refer to Cuckney Hill as Cuckney Mountain, as it appears diminished in size adjacent to the pit tip.

Cuckney Hill has been described as an accident blackspot, with many fatal accidents occurring over the years. In 2013, average speed cameras were installed as a means of enforcing a 50 miles per hour (m.p.h.) limitation, which itself was a reduction from the earlier 60mph.

== History ==
In the late 19th century, Cuckney Hill was considered one of the chief points in the range between Worksop and Nottingham. From the top there are good views of the woods of The Dukeries, and of Cuckney village and parish church on one side, and Church Warsop on the other.

In 1872, a field of barley on Cuckney Hill was chosen by the Duke of Portland's land agent as the site for a trial of six horse-drawn reapers. Land on Cuckney Hill was acquired for a cemetery in 1918; it was extended in 1998. The first pits at Welbeck Colliery were sunk in 1912. In the late 1980s, Welbeck and Church Warsop residents campaigned against a plan by British Coal to extend the Welbeck pit tip along Cuckney Hill, saying "They are proposing to put a hill on top of a hill. Cuckney Hill already has a long history of land slippages in wet weather."
