= Welbeck =

Village in Nottinghamshire, England

Coordinates: 53.261°N 1.168°W

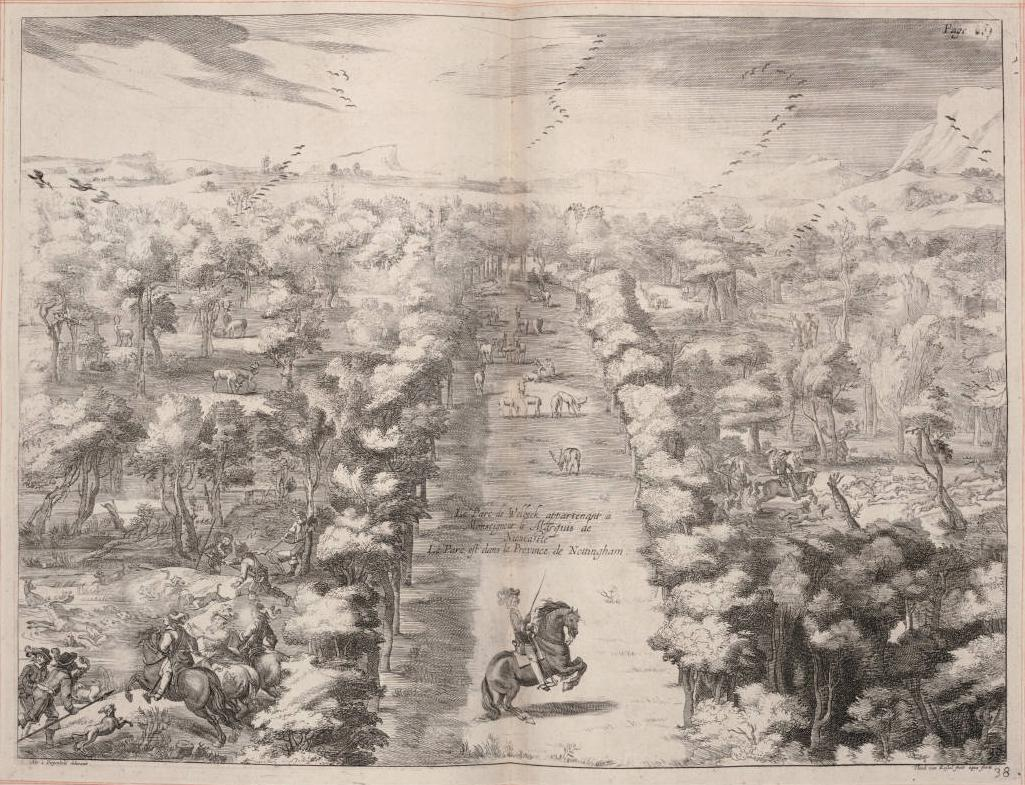
- Le Parc de Welbeck, after Abraham van Diepenbeeck

- Location within Nottinghamshire
- Population: 31 (2001 census)
- Civil parish: Norton, Cuckney, Holbeck and Welbeck
- District: Bassetlaw
- Shire county: Nottinghamshire
- Region: East Midlands
- Country: England
- Sovereign state: United Kingdom
- Website: https://nortoncuckneyholbeckwelbeckparishcouncil.gov.uk/

Welbeck is a village and former civil parish (now in the parish of Norton, Cuckney, Holbeck and Welbeck) within the Welbeck local voting ward of Bassetlaw District Council, in Nottinghamshire, England. It is slightly to the south-west of Worksop. In 2001 the parish had a population of 31.

Welbeck has a famous stately home, Welbeck Abbey, home of the Dukes of Portland, and which was founded in the twelfth century as a monastery.

The cricketer Ted Alletson, who held a batting world record for 50 years, is from Welbeck.

Archduke Franz Ferdinand accepted an invitation from the Duke of Portland to stay at Welbeck Abbey and arrived with his wife, Sophie, by train at Worksop on 22 November 1913. This was almost a year before his assassination, which triggered the First World War. The Archduke narrowly avoided being killed in a freak hunting accident during his stay.

== Civil parish ==
Welbeck was formerly an extra-parochial tract, from 1858 Welbeck was a civil parish in its own right, on 1 April 2023 the parish was abolished and merged with Holbeck, Norton and Cuckney to form "Norton, Cuckney, Holbeck and Welbeck".

== Welbeck Colliery ==
Sharing the same name, Welbeck Colliery operated from 1912 to 2011 at Welbeck Colliery Village (later renamed as Meden Vale), with a maximum of 1,400 miners producing 1.5 million tons per year. It was eventually operated by UK Coal after the dissolution of the National Coal Board. In 2010 UK Coal were fined £1.2 million of safety breaches at Welbeck Colliery that resulted in the death of a worker.

== See also ==
- Listed buildings in Welbeck
