= Cuckney Castle =

Site of former castle in North Nottinghamshire

Cuckney motte and bailey castle
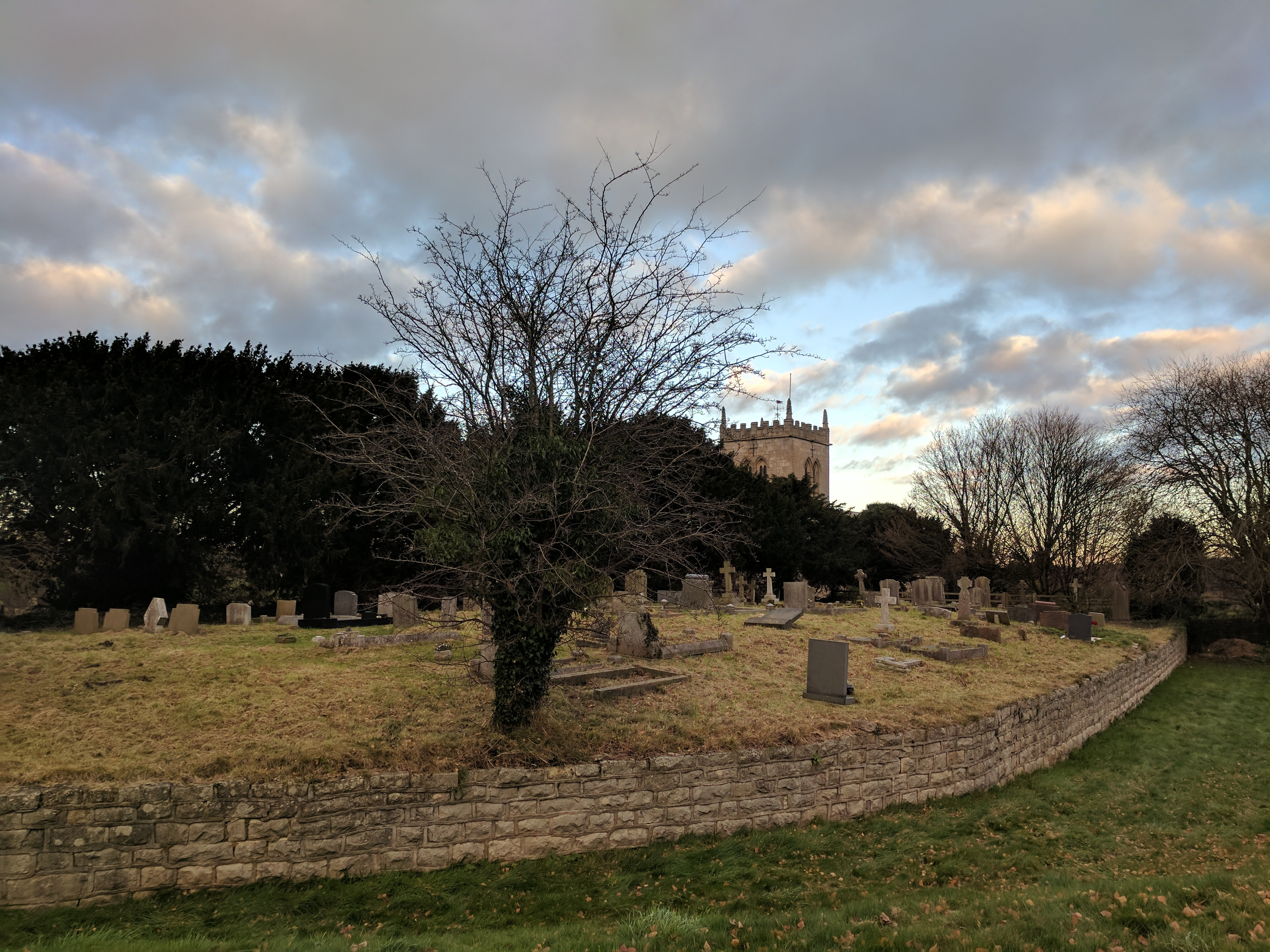
- Cuckney motte and bailey castle, December 2017
- Location: Cuckney, Nottinghamshire
- Coordinates: 53°14′10″N 1°09′15″W
- OS grid reference: SK 56582 71405
- Built: 11th century
- Built for: Thomas de Cuckney

Scheduled monument
- Designated: 28 April 1953
- Reference no.: 1010909

Cuckney Castle was in the village of Cuckney, Nottinghamshire between Worksop and Market Warsop (grid reference SK566714).

It was a motte and bailey fortress founded by Thomas de Cuckney. It was razed after The Anarchy in the reign of King Stephen. There are now the low remains of a motte, partly enclosed by a wide ditch and to the west the faint remnants of a bailey. These remains can be found at the edge of the churchyard of St Mary's Church, Norton Cuckney.

Cuckney motte and bailey castle is listed as a Scheduled Monument by the Department for Digital, Culture, Media and Sport.

In the 1950s, a mass grave of approximately 200 human remains was found in a trench near the churchyard, leading to speculation regarding a battle near the site.

== See also ==
- Adulterine castle
