= Cuckney =

Village in Nottinghamshire, England

Coordinates: 53.235°N 1.154°W

- Village
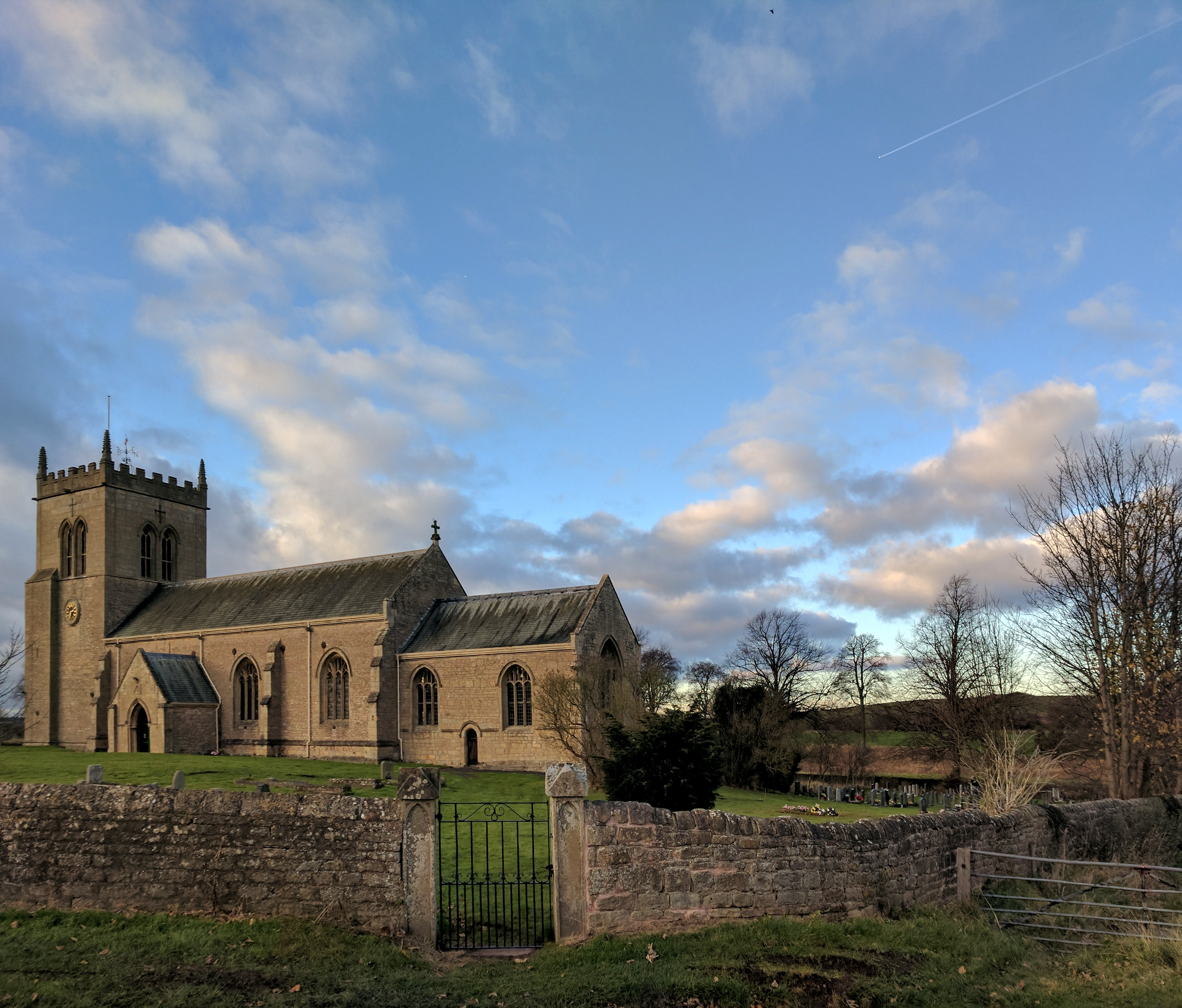
- St Mary’s Church

- Location within Nottinghamshire
- Population: 215 (2001 census)
- Civil parish: Norton, Cuckney, Holbeck and Welbeck
- District: Bassetlaw
- Shire county: Nottinghamshire
- Region: East Midlands
- Country: England
- Sovereign state: United Kingdom
- Post town: MANSFIELD
- Postcode district: NG20
- Dialling code: 01623
- Police: Nottinghamshire
- Fire: Nottinghamshire
- Ambulance: East Midlands
- UK Parliament: Bassetlaw
- Website: https://nortoncuckneyholbeckwelbeckparishcouncil.gov.uk/

Cuckney is a village and former civil parish, now in the parish of Norton, Cuckney, Holbeck and Welbeck, in the Bassetlaw district of Nottinghamshire, England, located between Worksop and Church Warsop. In 2001 the parish had a population of 215.

The A60 road connects Church Warsop and Cuckney via Cuckney Hill.

== History ==
The grounds of Cuckney Parish Church, a Grade I listed building, contain the remains of Cuckney Castle.

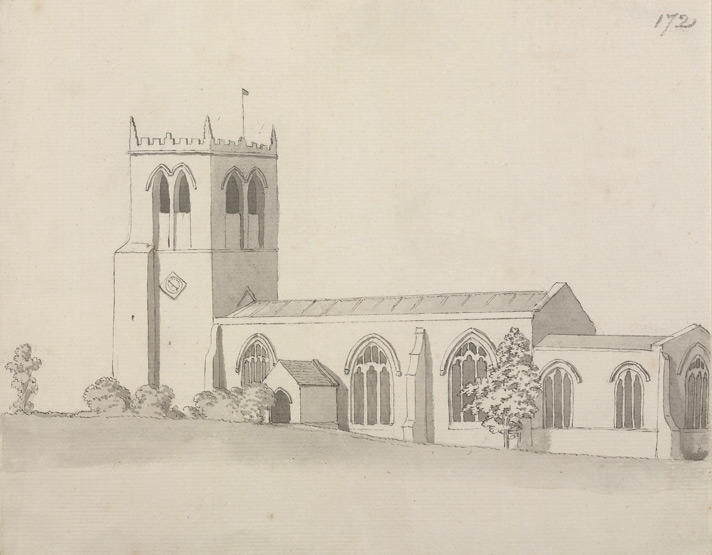
Cuckney Church in the eighteenth century

George Sitwell, Ironmaster mined iron locally and he built a blast furnace here in the seventeenth century.

In 1853 there were two large watermills on the river Poulter in Cuckney, one for cotton, another for corn. An earlier cotton mill had burnt down in 1792.

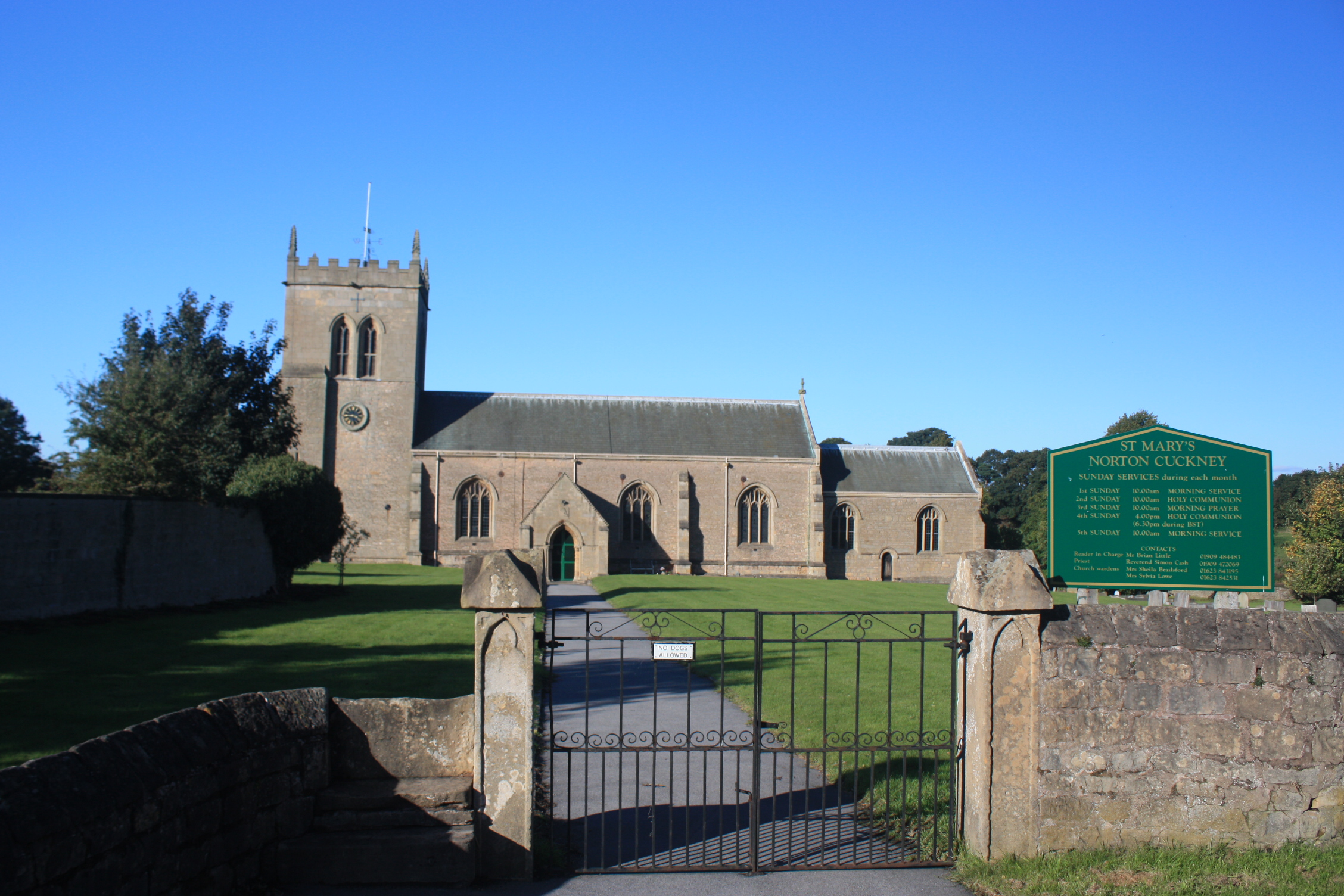
St Mary’s Church Norton/Cuckney

On 1 April 2015 the civil parish was abolished and merged with Norton to form "Norton and Cuckney". On 1 April 2023 it became part of Norton, Cuckney, Holbeck and Welbeck.

It is also believed that the Battle of Hatfield Chase took place close to Cuckney due to the discovery of a mass burial beneath the church, and due to the etymological links of nearby Edwinstowe, named after the king that died in the battle.

== The school ==
The upstream mill is now a primary school. Cuckney Church of England Primary School has 140 pupils on its roll.

== Landmarks ==
Several buildings in Cuckney are listed as features of historical interest, including St Mary's Church (Grade I) and the dam by Cuckney Mill (Grade II)
