= St Mary's Church, Norton Cuckney =

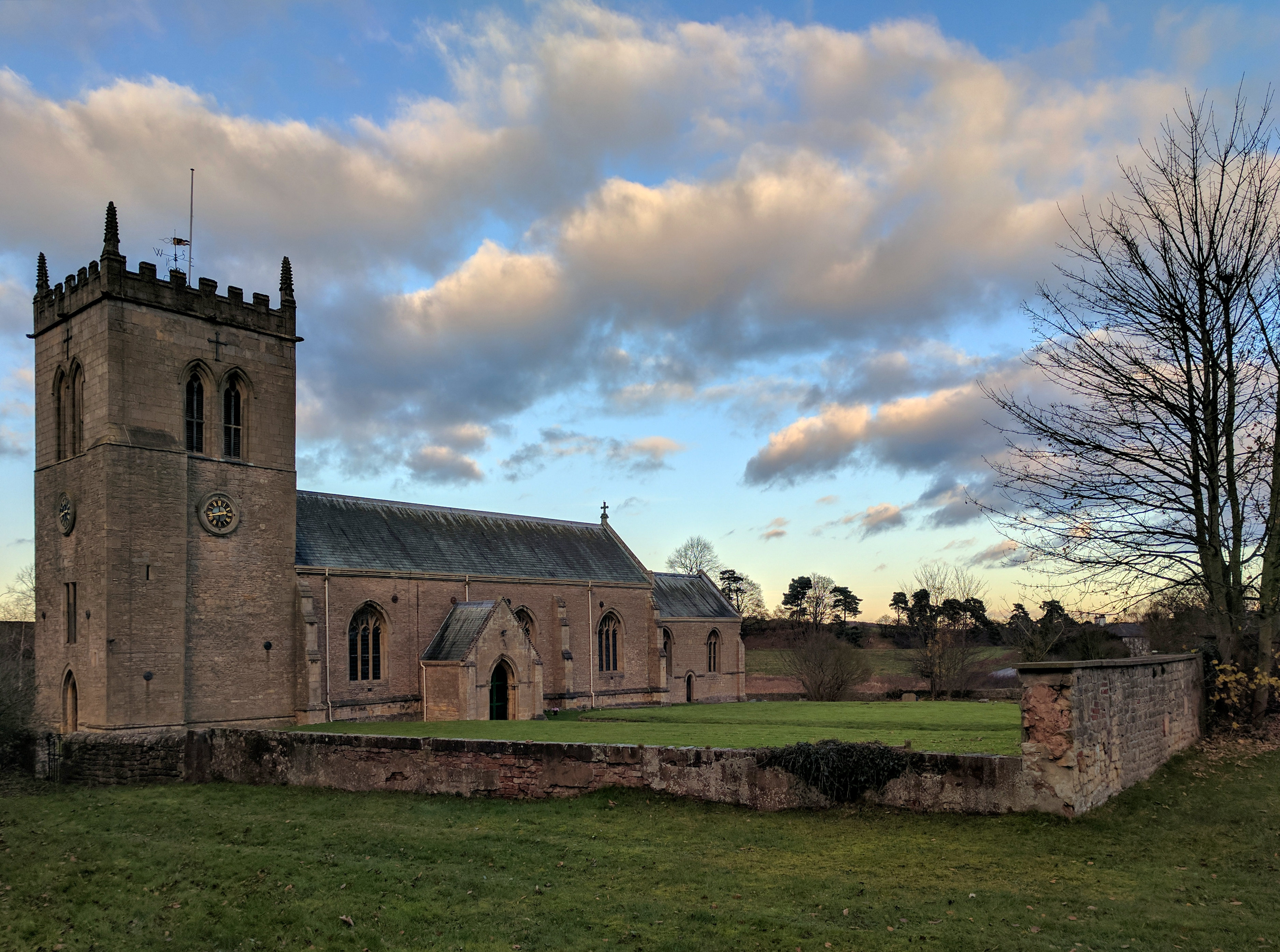
- St Mary's Church, Norton Cuckney
- St Mary's Church, Norton Cuckney
- 53°14′12.16″N 1°9′10.77″W
- OS grid reference: SK 56632 71391
- Location: Cuckney
- Country: England
- Denomination: Church of England

History
- Dedication: St Mary

Architecture
- Heritage designation: Grade I listed

Administration
- Diocese: Diocese of Southwell and Nottingham
- Archdeaconry: Newark
- Deanery: Bassetlaw and Bawtry
- Parish: Norton Cuckney

St Mary's Church, Norton Cuckney is a Grade I listed parish church in the Church of England in Cuckney.

At the edge of the churchyard are the remains of Cuckney Castle, a motte and bailey castle listed as a Scheduled Monument by the Department for Digital, Culture, Media and Sport.

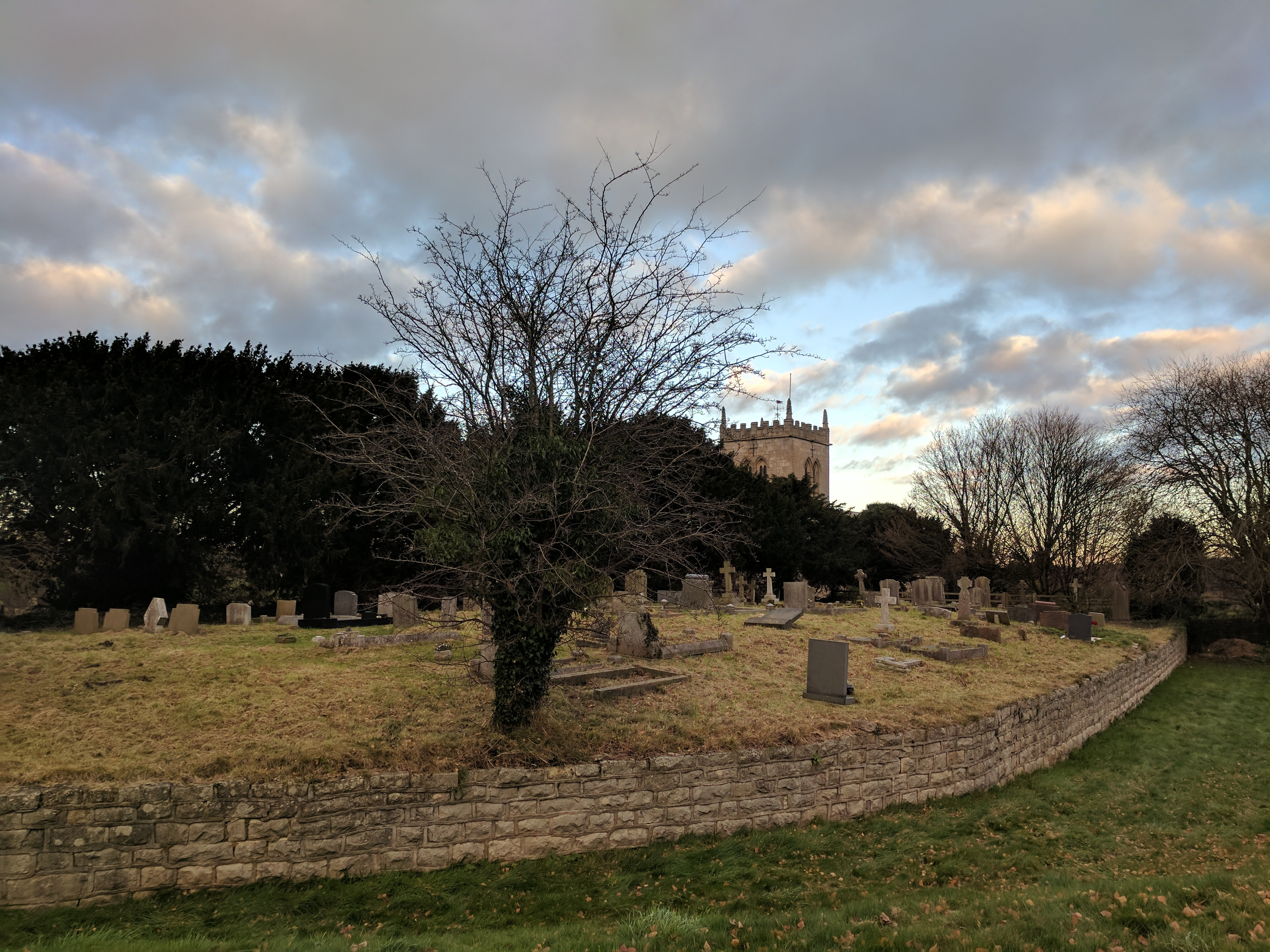
Cuckney motte and bailey castle (Church of St Mary in the background)

== History ==
The church dates from the 12th century, and was restored in 1667, 1892 and 1907.

It is in a joint parish with

- St Winifred's Church, Holbeck
- Welbeck College Chapel

== Memorials ==
In the nave floor is a worn slab of black marble, reputed to be the tomb of Robert Pierrepont, 1st Earl of Kingston-upon-Hull, c.1643.

== Organ ==
The church contains a pipe organ by Brindley & Foster dating from 1877. A specification of the organ can be found on the National Pipe Organ Register.

== See also ==
- Grade I listed buildings in Nottinghamshire
- Listed buildings in Norton and Cuckney

== Gallery ==
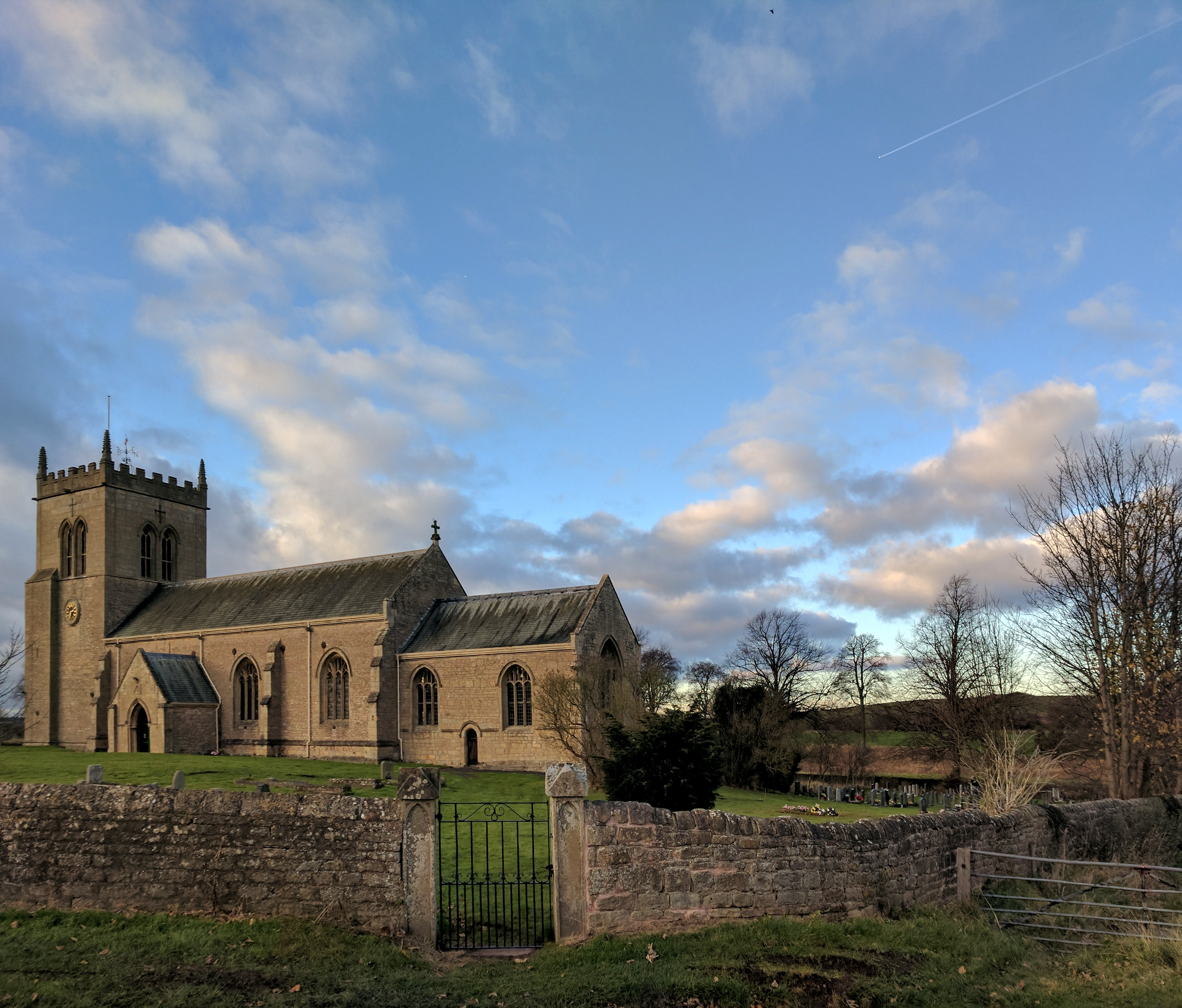
St Mary's Church, Norton Lane, Cuckney

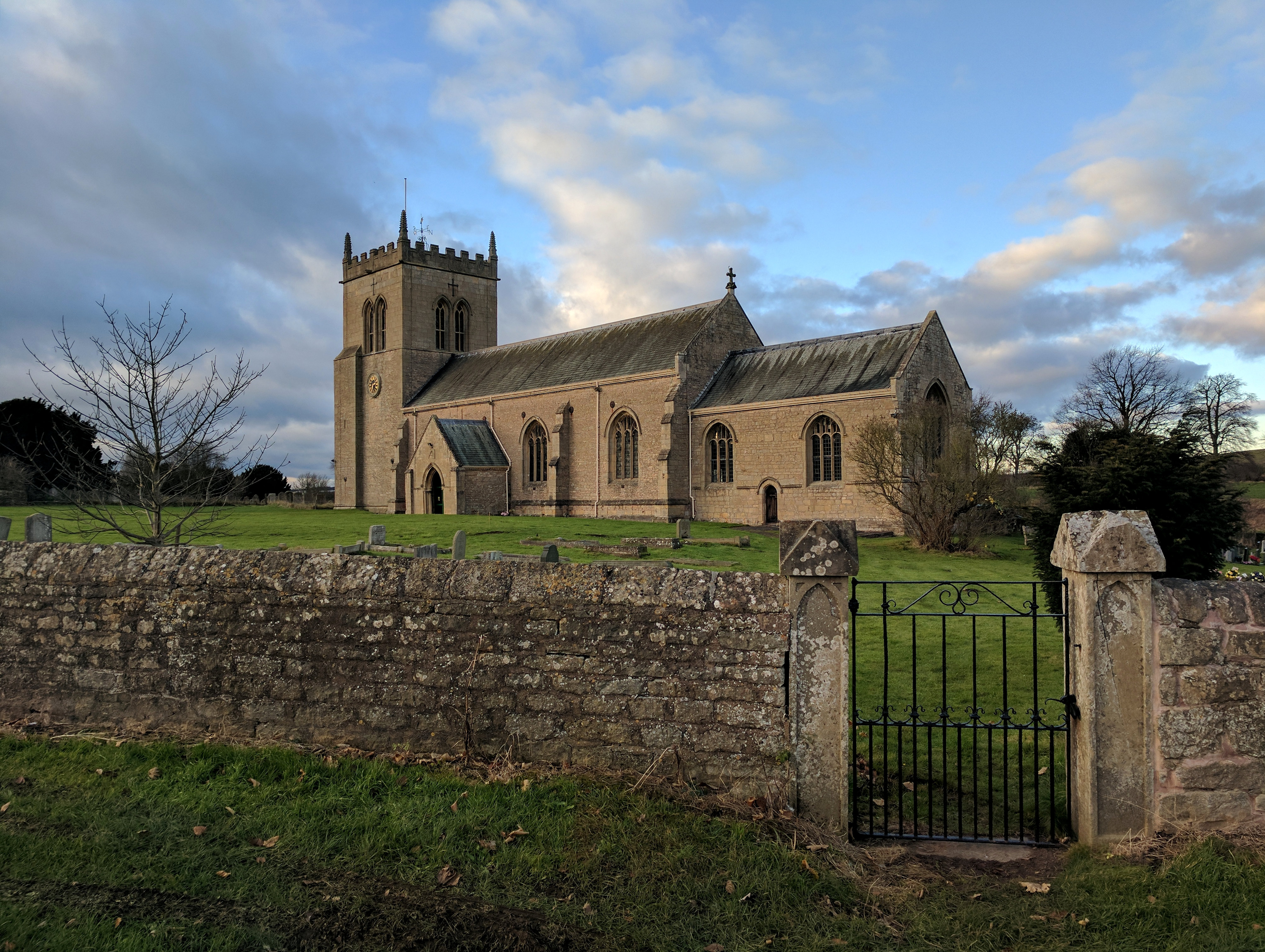
St Mary's Church, Norton Lane, Cuckney

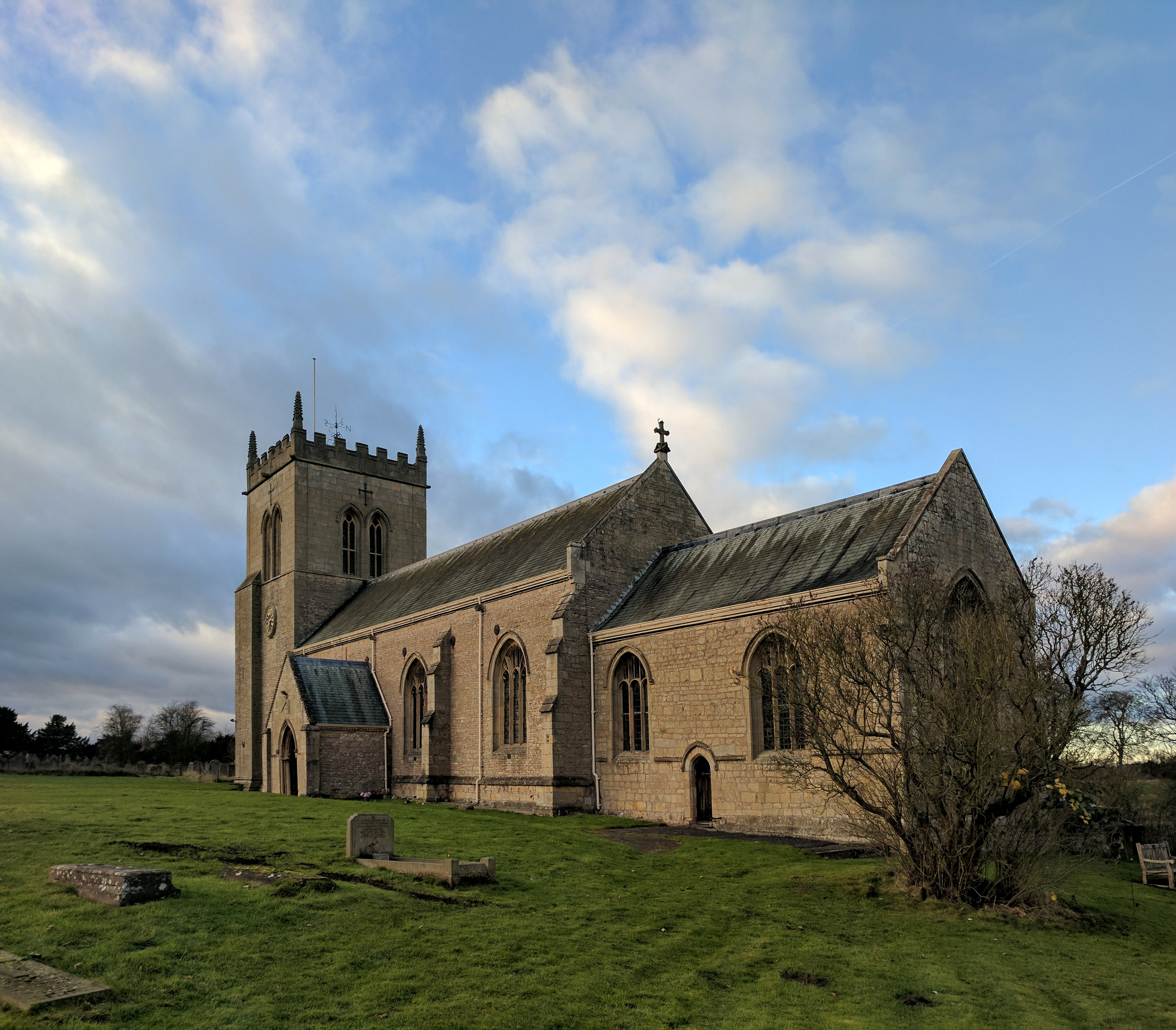
St Mary's Church, Norton Lane, Cuckney

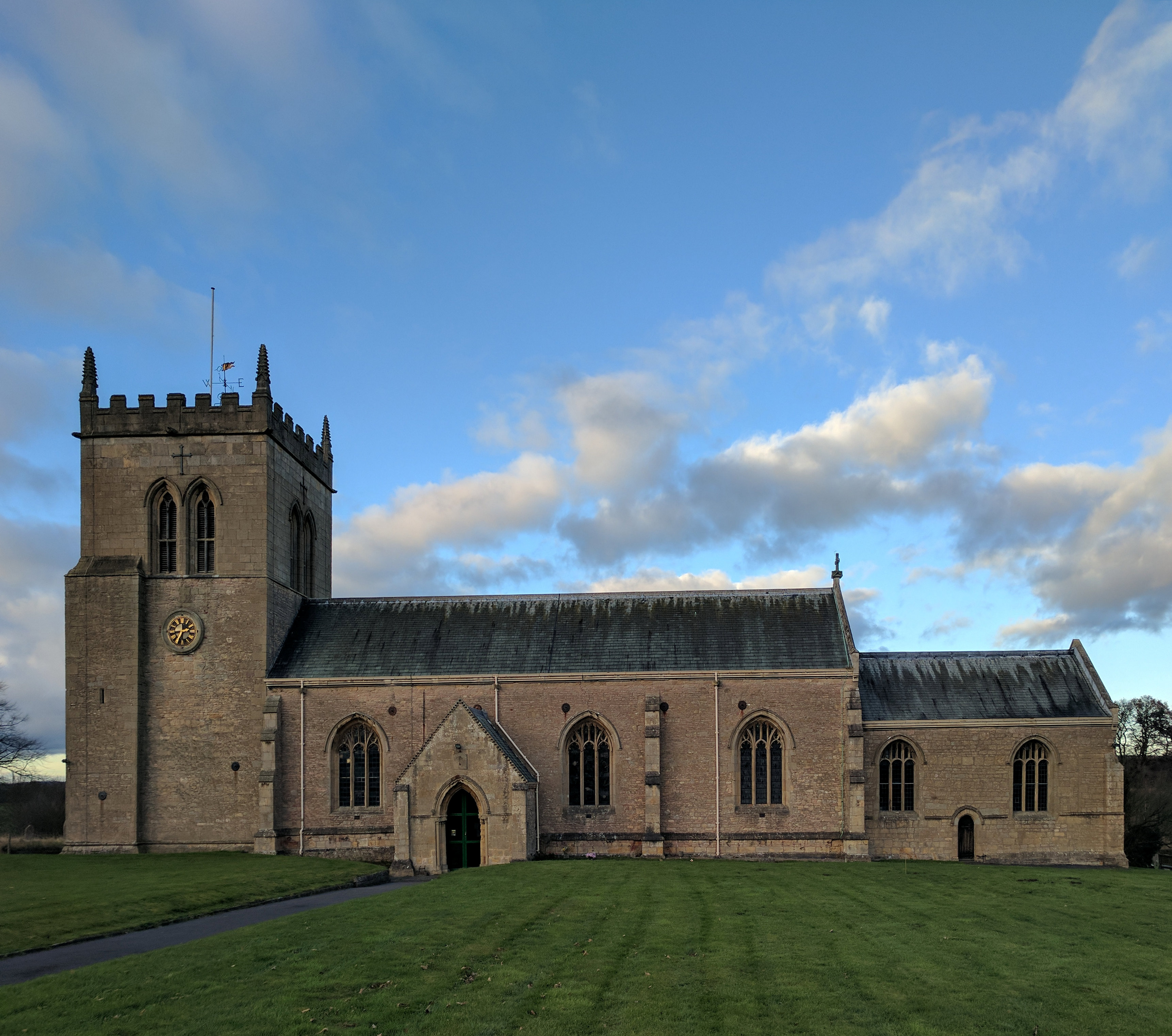
St Mary's Church, Norton Lane, Cuckney

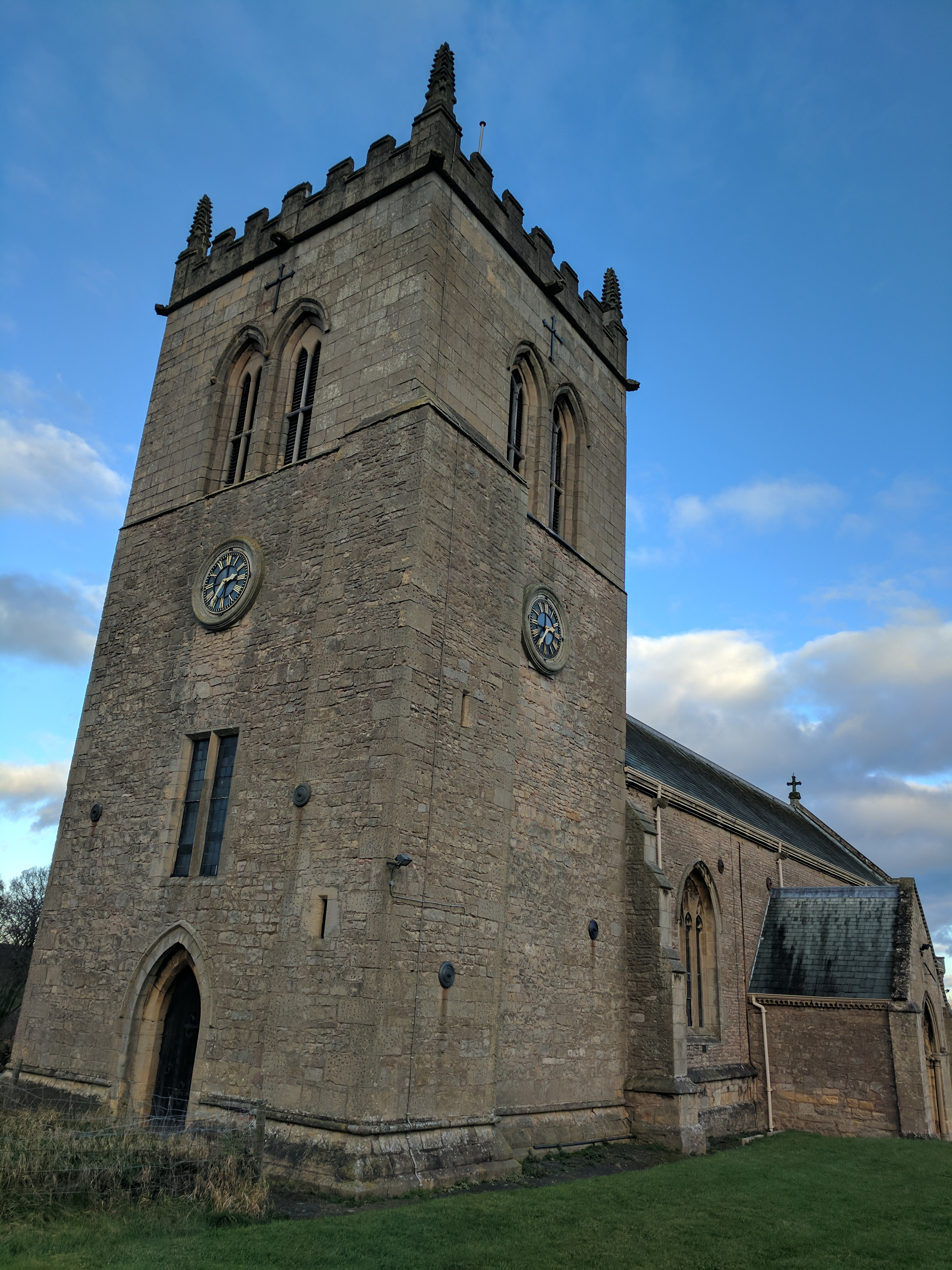
St Mary's Church, Norton Lane, Cuckney

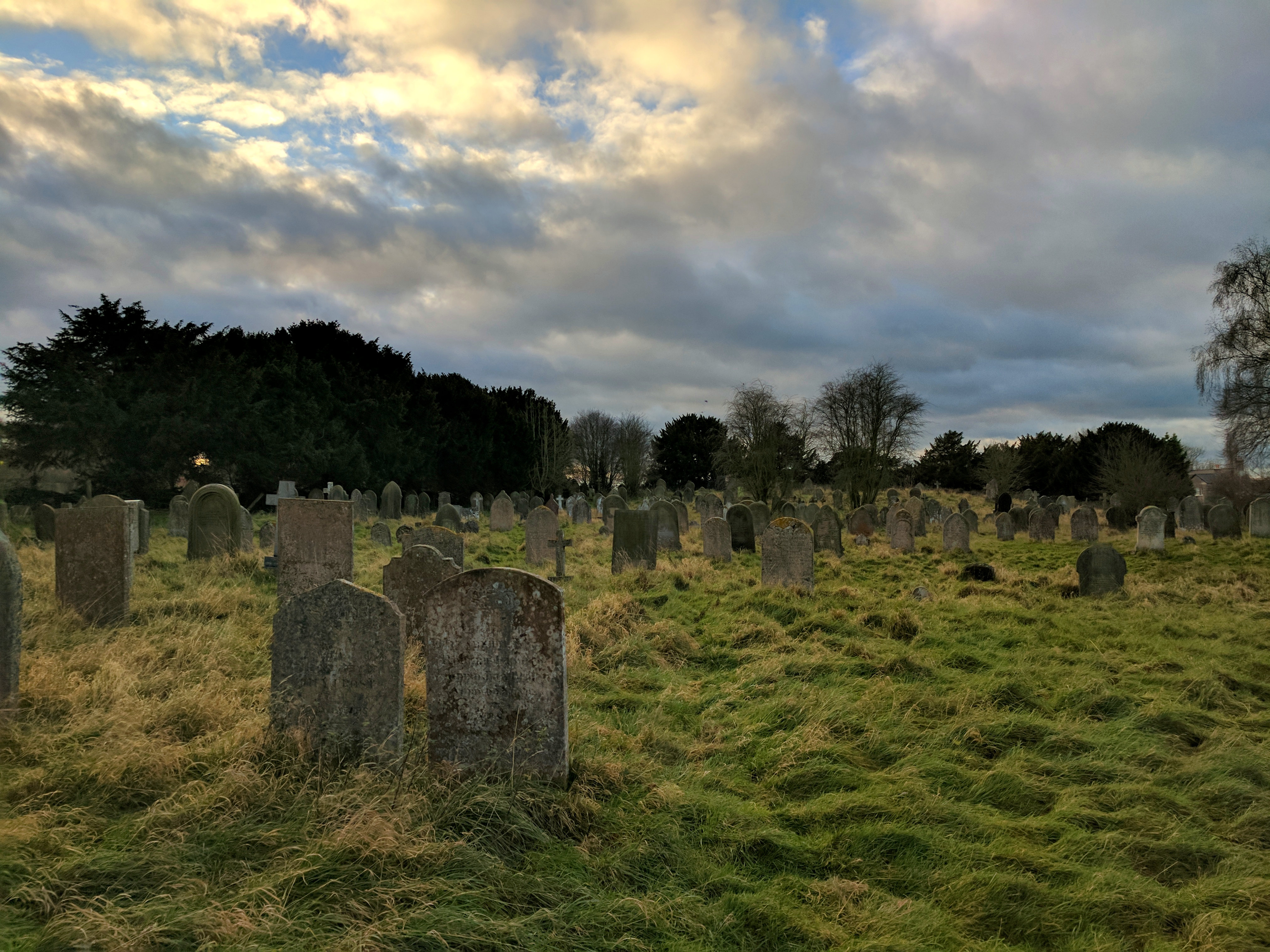
Churchyard of St Mary's Church, Norton Lane, Cuckney

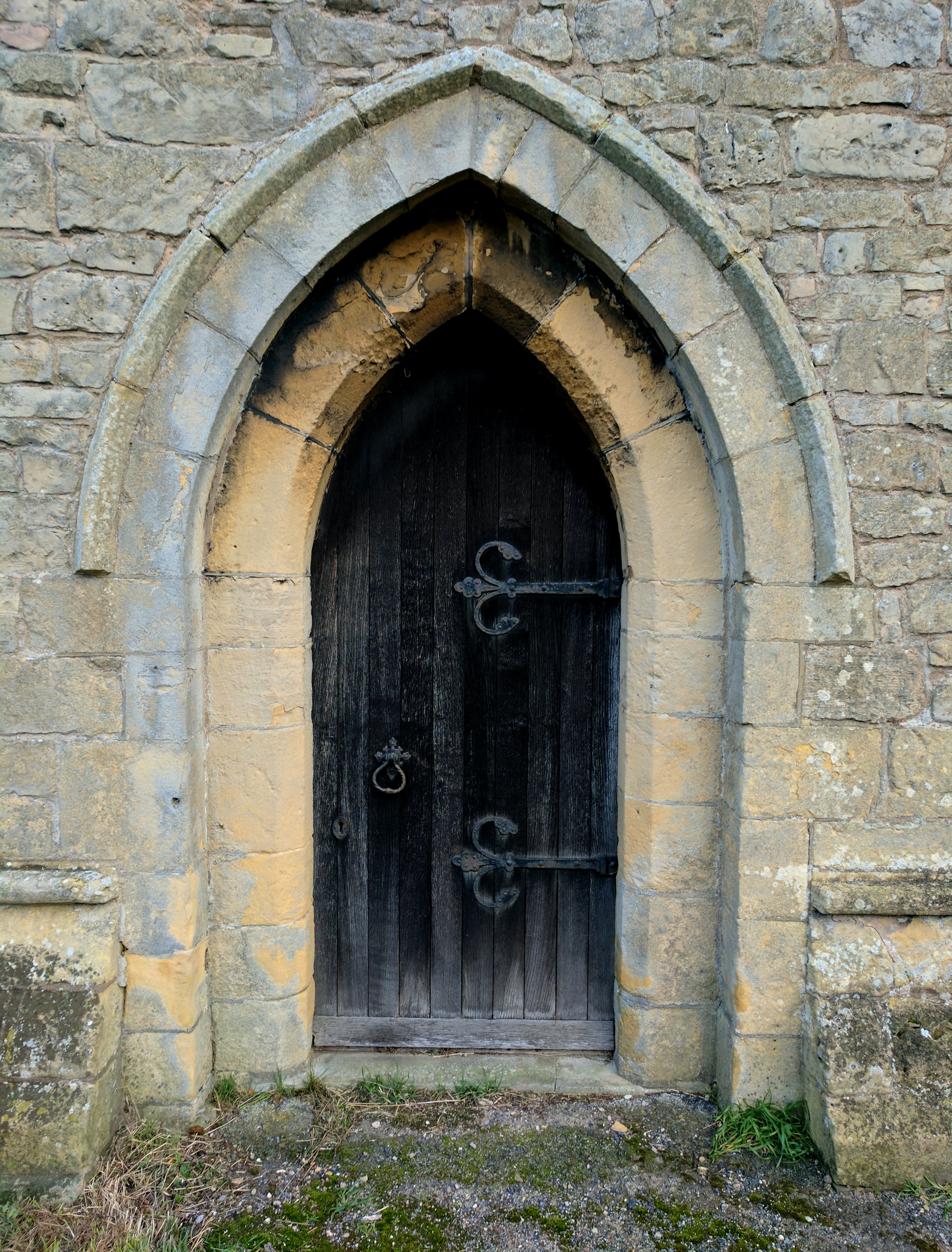
St Mary's Church, Norton Lane, Cuckney

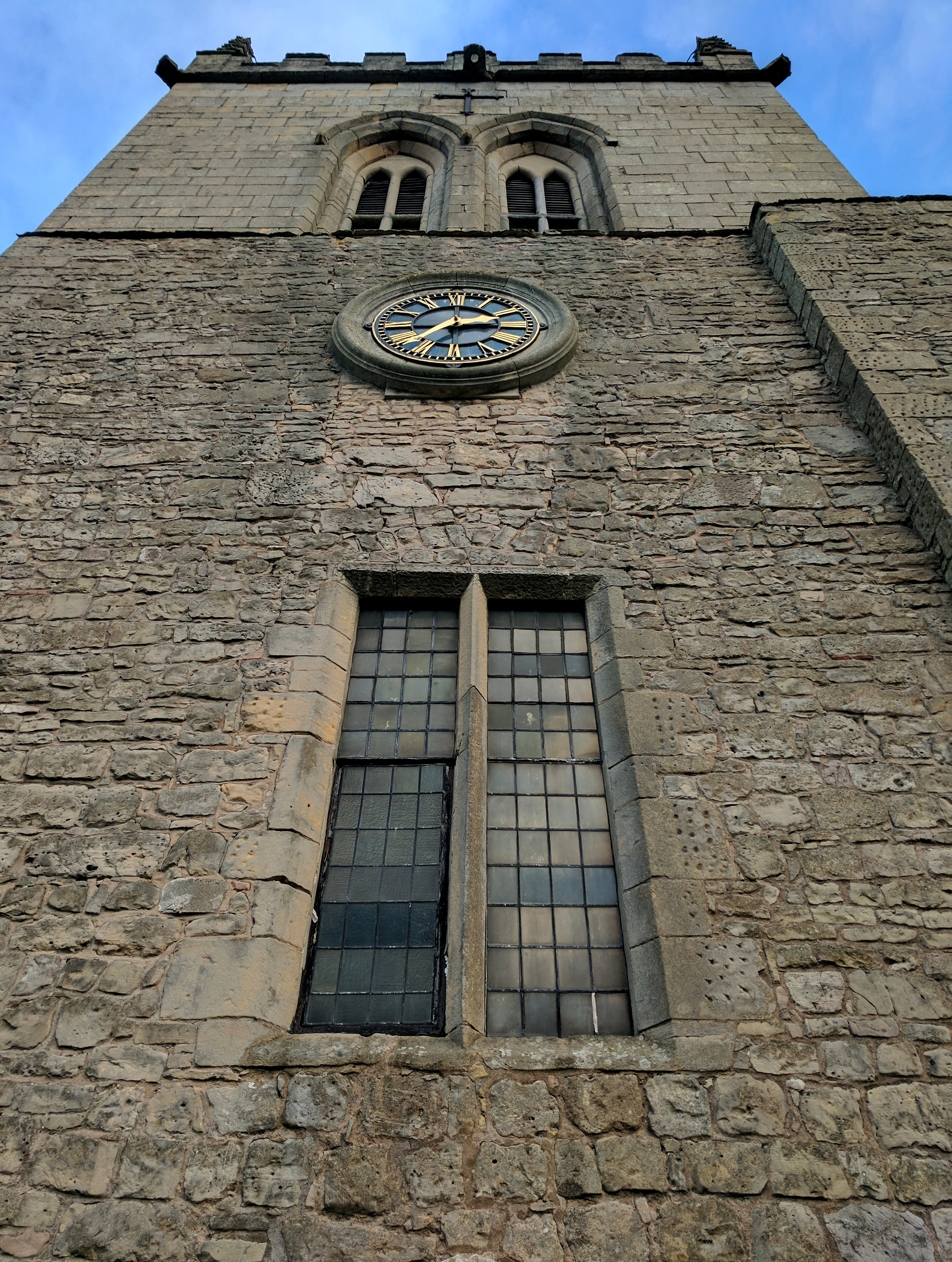
St Mary's Church, Norton Lane, Cuckney

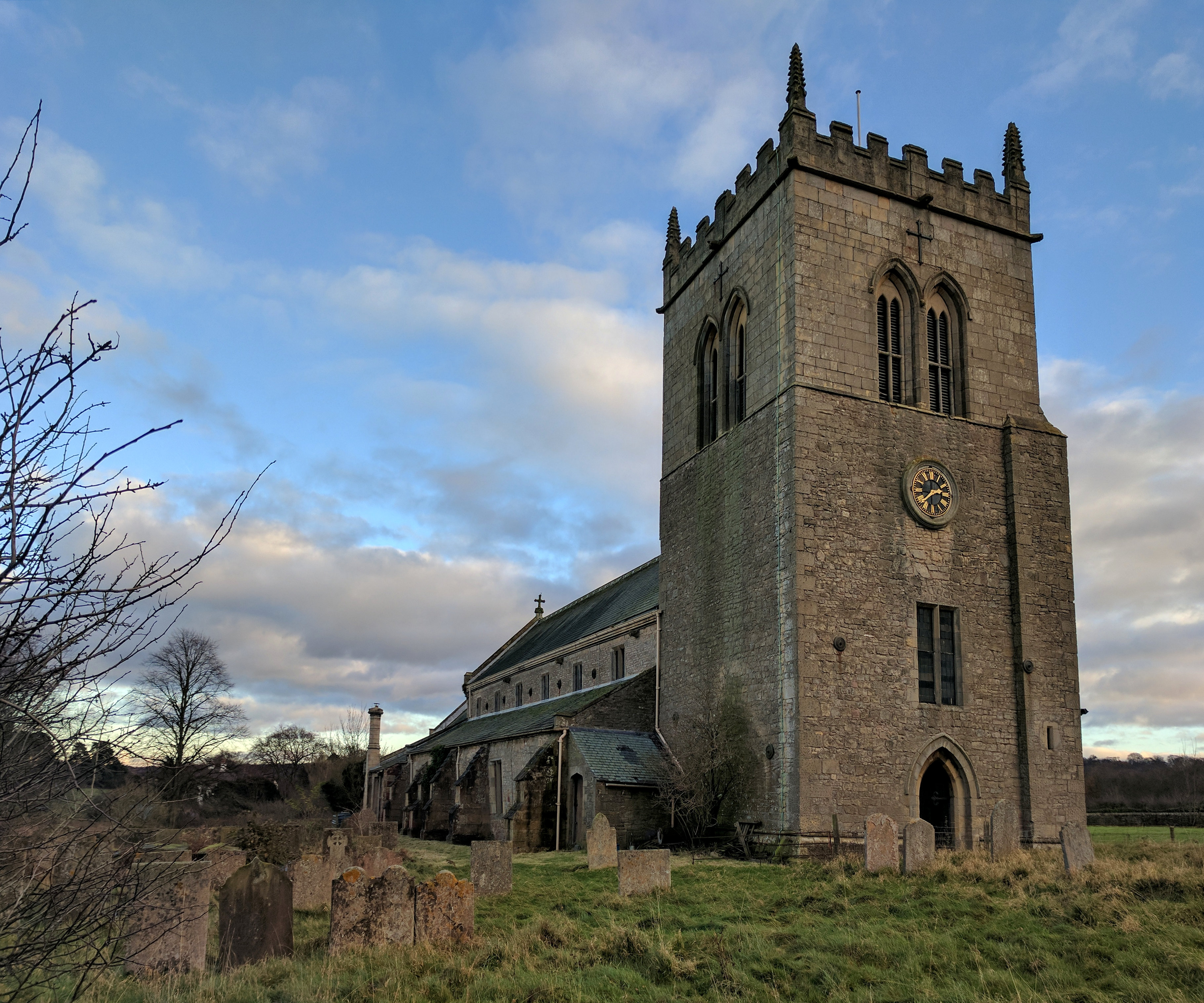
St Mary's Church, Norton Lane, Cuckney

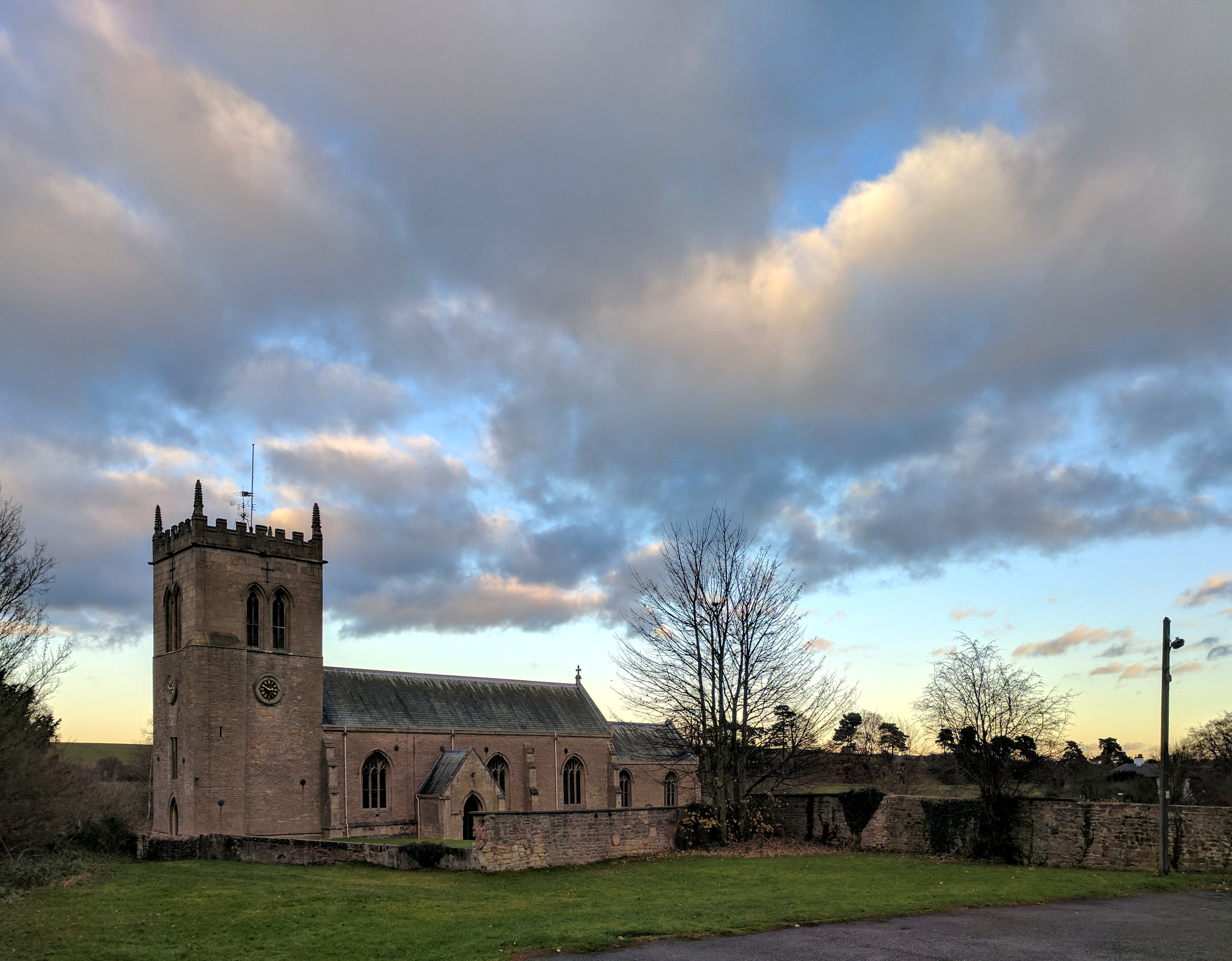
St Mary's Church, Norton Lane, Cuckney

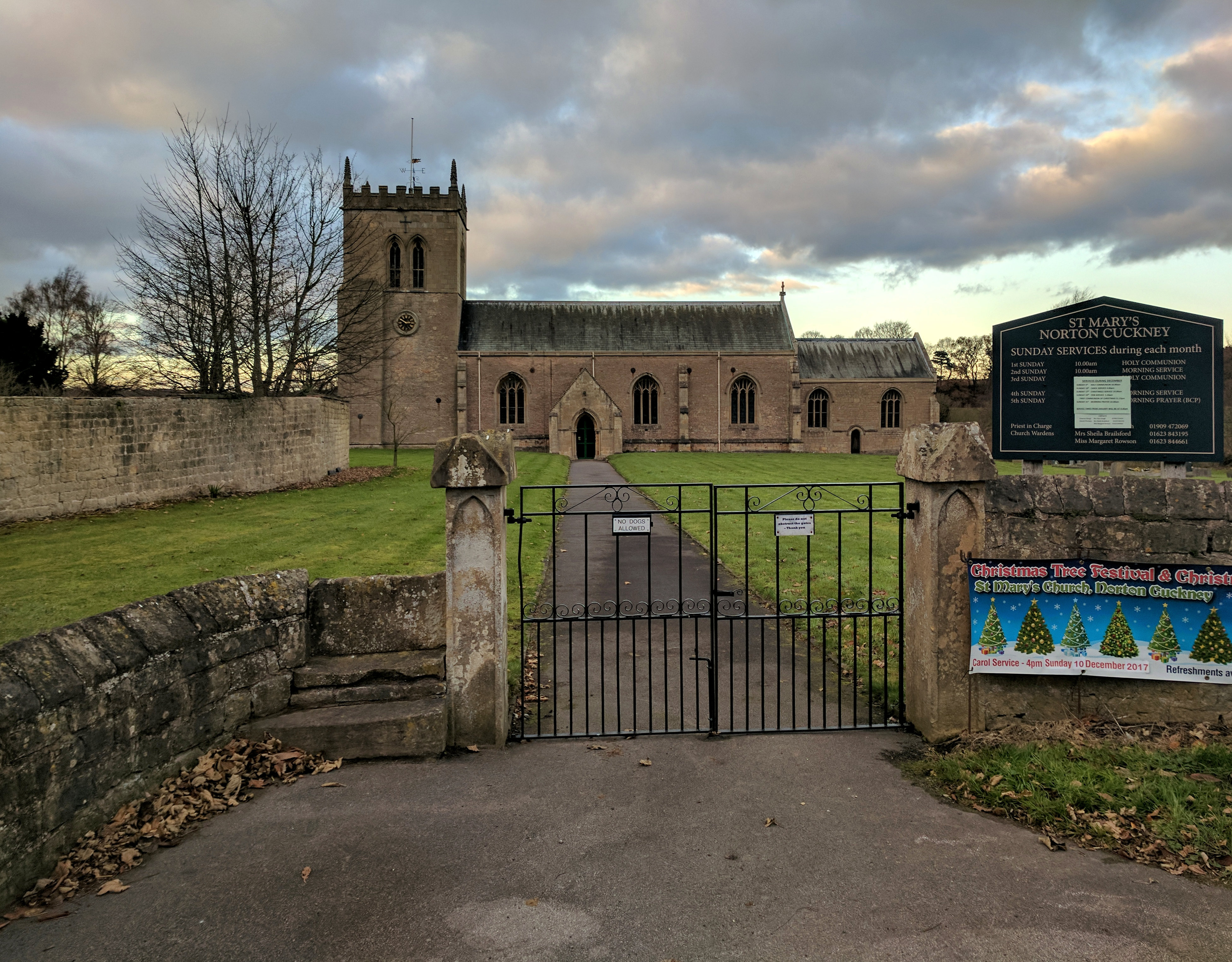
St Mary's Church, Norton Lane, Cuckney

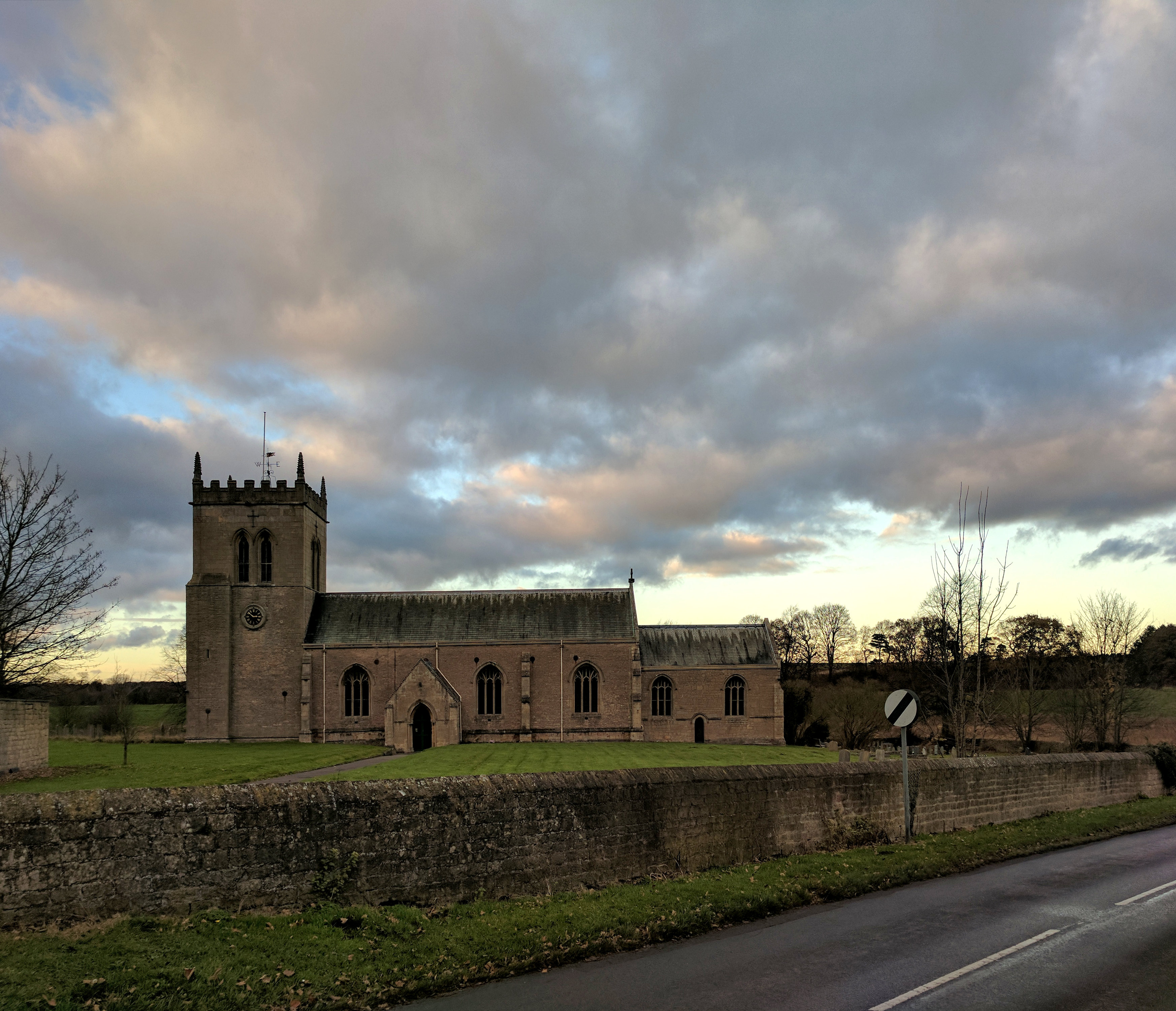
St Mary's Church, Norton Lane, Cuckney

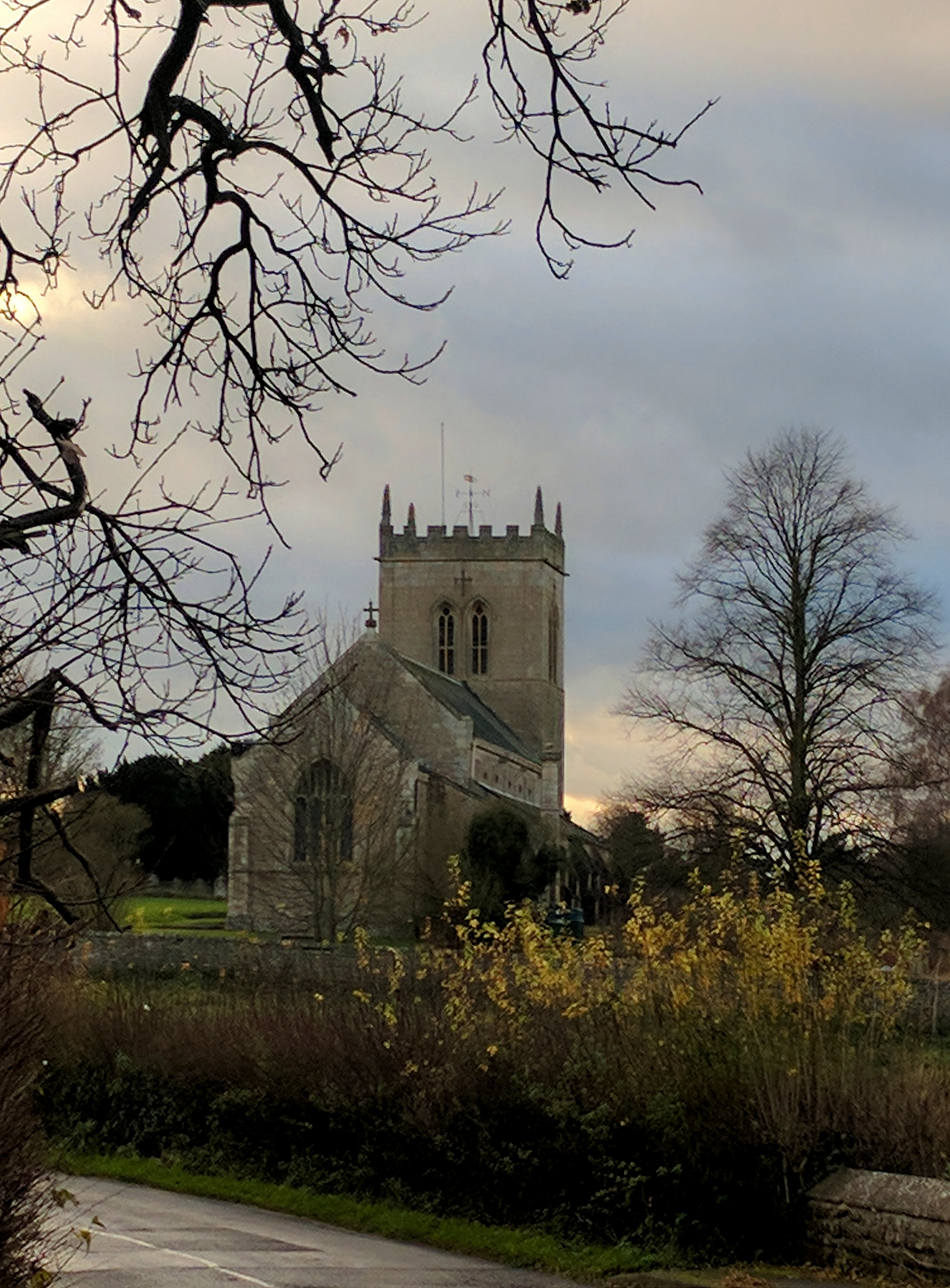
St Mary's Church, Norton Lane, Cuckney

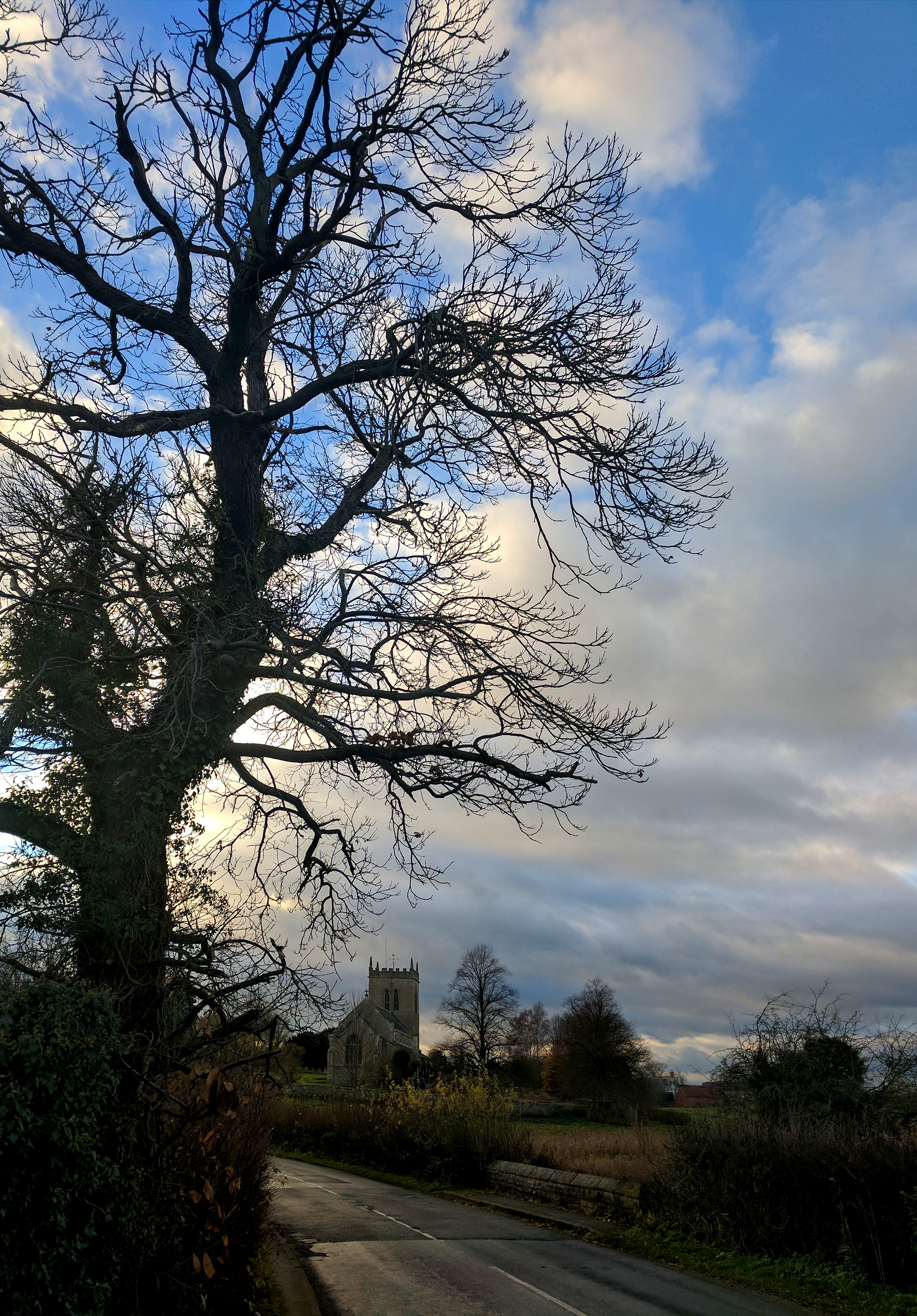
St Mary's Church, Norton Lane, Cuckney

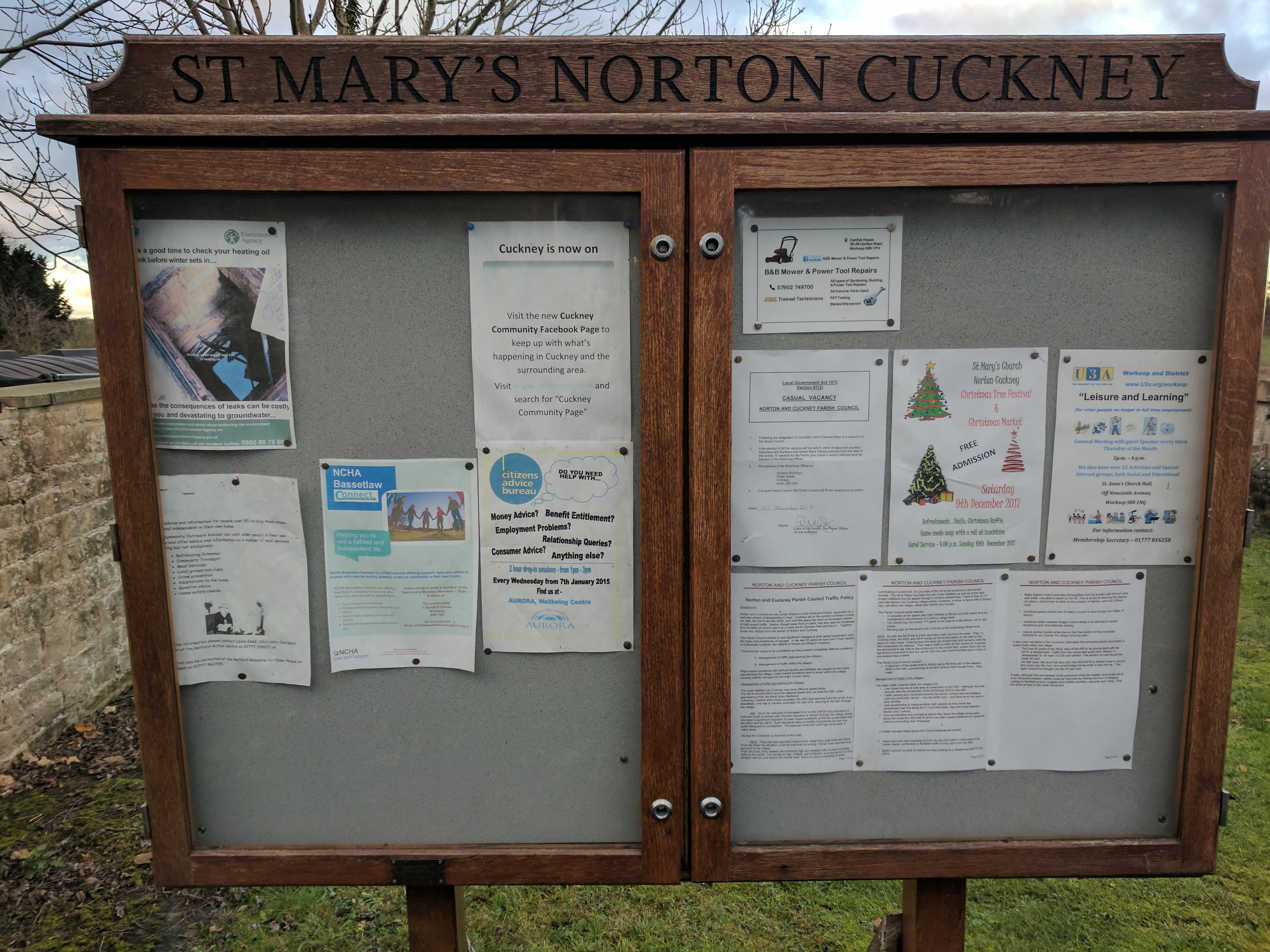
Church Sign at St Mary's Church, Norton Lane, Cuckney

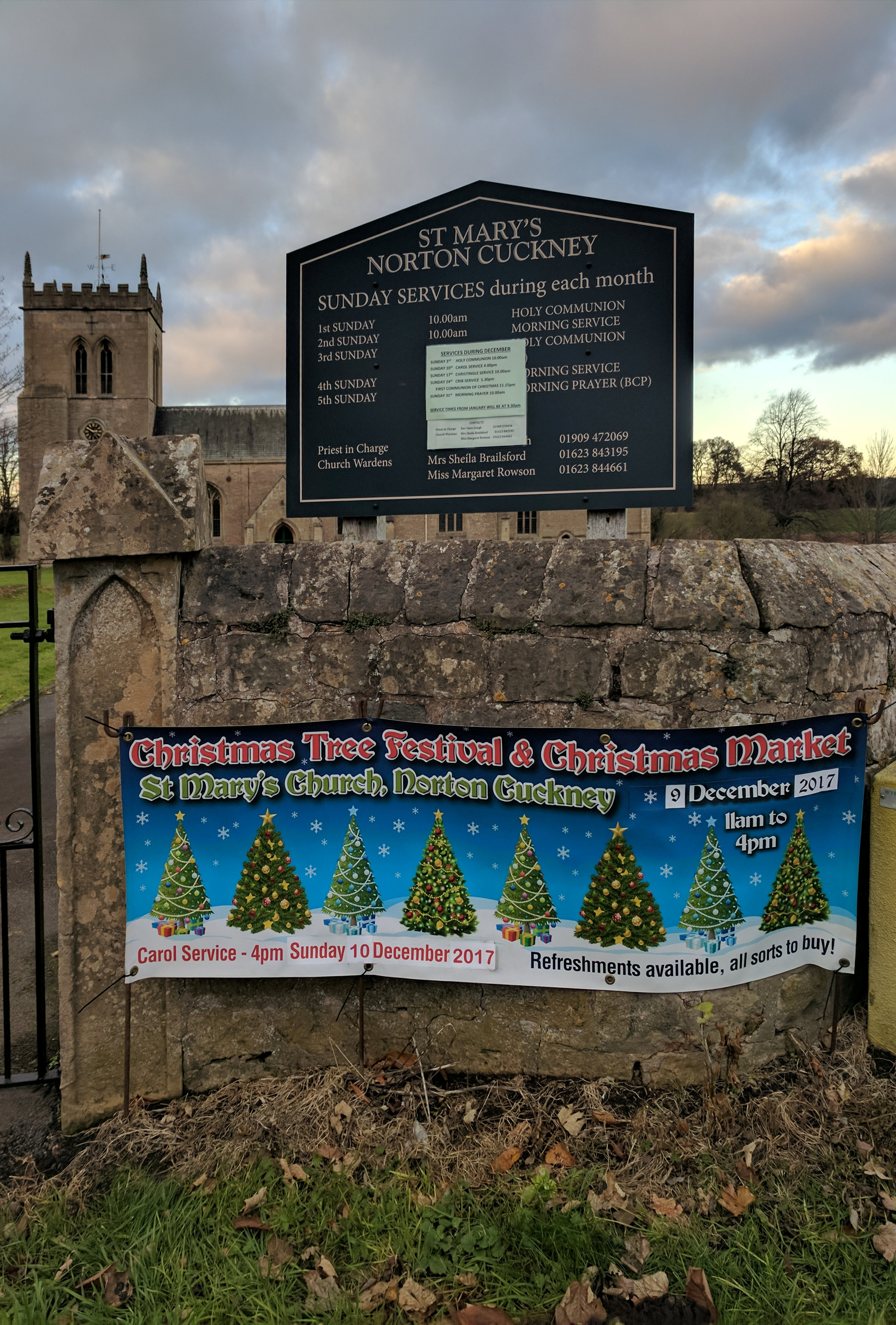
Church Sign at St Mary's Church, Norton Lane, Cuckney
