= Norton, Nottinghamshire =

Village in Nottinghamshire, England

Coordinates: 53.242°N 1.145°W

Norton
- Village
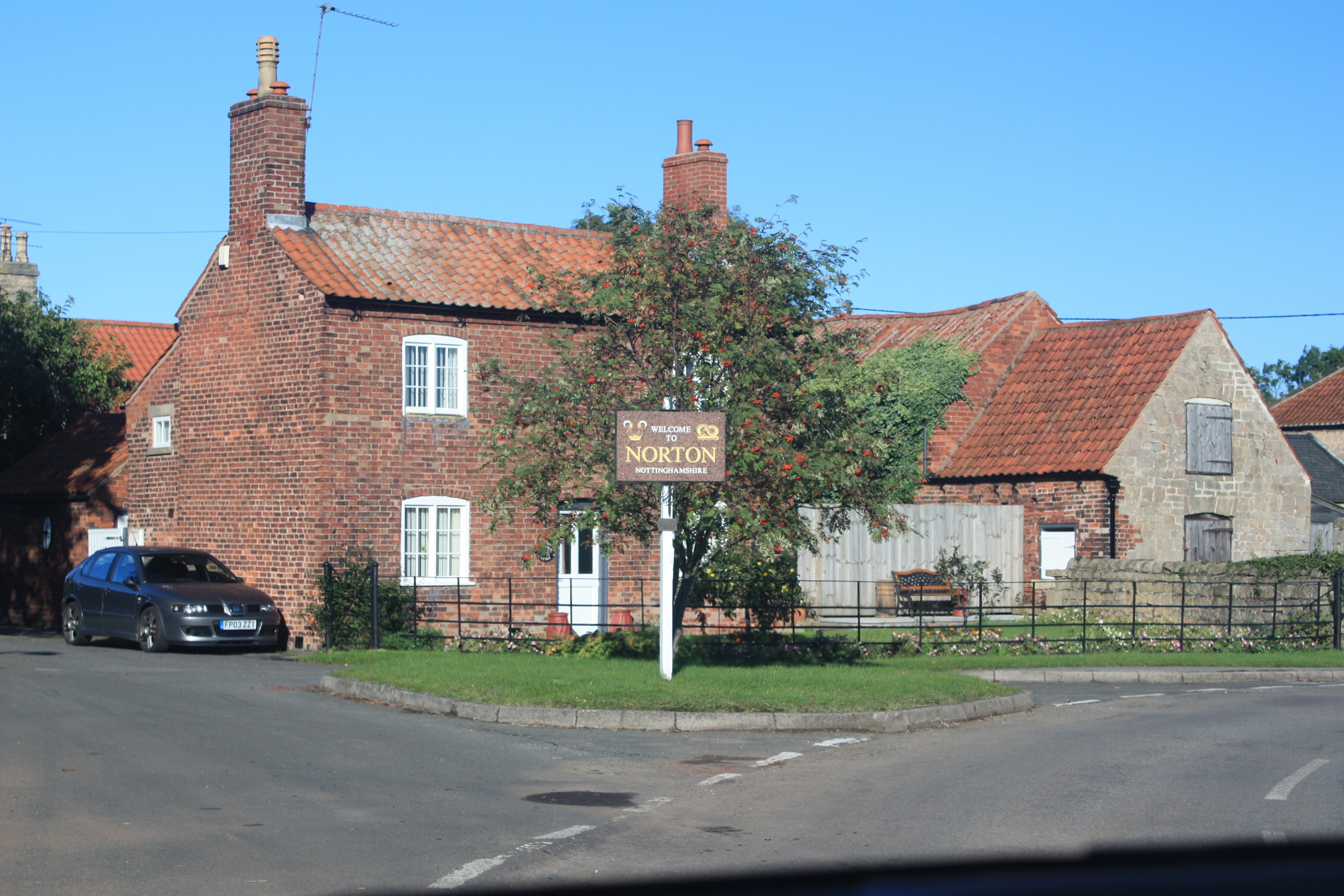
- The centre of Norton Village

- Location within Nottinghamshire
- Population: 140 (2001 census)
- Civil parish: Norton, Cuckney, Holbeck and Welbeck
- District: Bassetlaw
- Shire county: Nottinghamshire
- Region: East Midlands
- Country: England
- Sovereign state: United Kingdom
- Post town: MANSFIELD
- Postcode district: NG20
- Dialling code: 01623
- UK Parliament: Bassetlaw
- Website: https://nortoncuckneyholbeckwelbeckparishcouncil.gov.uk/

Norton is a village and former civil parish, now in the parish of Norton, Cuckney, Holbeck and Welbeck, in the Bassetlaw district, in the county of Nottinghamshire, England. It is just north of Cuckney, and is home to a number of farmsteads. Lying within the original extent of Sherwood Forest, and on its present edge, and lying within the Welbeck Abbey Estate. Norton was formerly a township in the parish of Cuckney, In 2001 the parish had a population of 140. Norton became a civil parish in 1866, on 1 April 2015 the parish was abolished and merged with Cuckney to form "Norton and Cuckney", On 1 April 2023 it became part of Norton, Cuckney, Holbeck and Welbeck. It is located not that far from the county's border with Derbyshire.

== Landmarks ==
Several residences, farms and cottages in the village, including Norton Grange, Norton House and The Rookeries are listed as features of historical interest.
