= Robin Hood Way =

Walking route in central midlands

Coordinates: 53.272°N 1.143°W

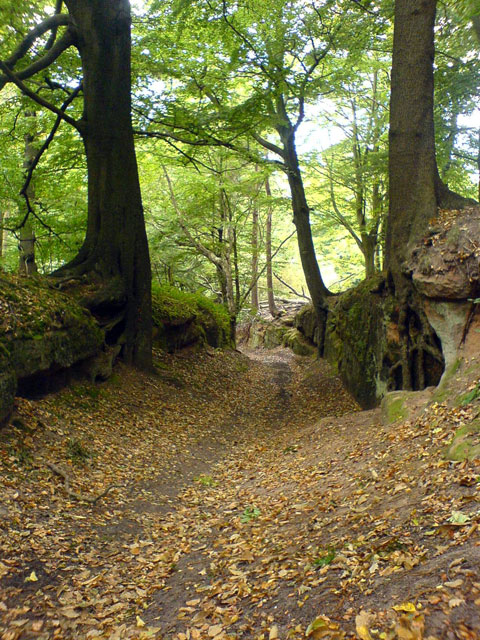
- Robin Hood Way
- Length: 177 km (110 mi)
- Location: Nottinghamshire
- Use: Hiking
- Highest point: 157 metres (515 ft)
- Season: All year Round
- Sights: Sherwood Forest

The Robin Hood Way is a waymarked long-distance footpath in the Midlands of England.

== Length ==
The Robin Hood Way runs for 177 kilometres (110 mi).

== Route ==
The Robin Hood Way commemorates the famous folklore figure Robin Hood and starts from Nottingham Castle running to Edwinstowe.

It passes through Sherwood Forest, taking in Clumber Park, Farnsfield, Greasley, Kimberley, Rainworth, Creswell Crags, Kirton and Bothamsall.
