= Holbeck, Nottinghamshire =

Village in Nottinghamshire, England

Coordinates: 53.25°N 1.18°W

Holbeck
- Village
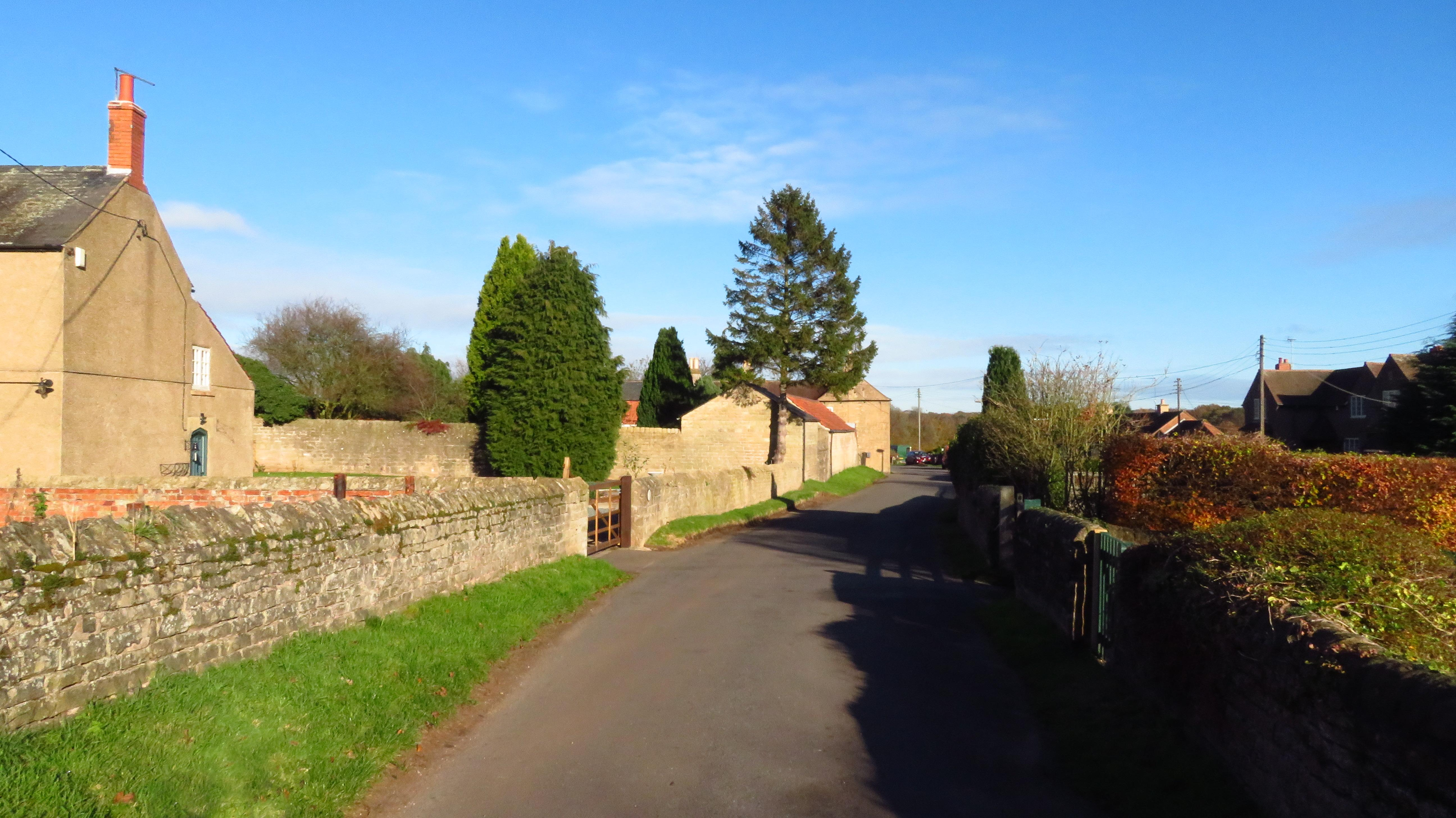
- Holbeck Lane

- Location within Nottinghamshire
- Population: 195 (2011)
- OS grid reference: SK544732
- Civil parish: Norton, Cuckney, Holbeck and Welbeck
- District: Bassetlaw
- Shire county: Nottinghamshire
- Region: East Midlands
- Country: England
- Sovereign state: United Kingdom
- Post town: WORKSOP
- Postcode district: S80
- Police: Nottinghamshire
- Fire: Nottinghamshire
- Ambulance: East Midlands
- UK Parliament: Bassetlaw

Holbeck is a village and former civil parish, now in the parish of Norton, Cuckney, Holbeck and Welbeck, in the Bassetlaw district, in the county of Nottinghamshire, England. It is located 6 miles south-west of Worksop. According to the 2001 census it the parish a population of 449, reducing to 195 (including Holbeck Woodhouse and Welbeck) at the 2011 Census. It is an estate village built for the Dukes of Portland at Welbeck Abbey.

== History ==
Holbeck was formerly a township in the parish of Norton-Cuckney, from 1866 Holbeck was a civil parish in its own right, on 1 April 2023 the parish was abolished and merged with Norton and Cuckney and Welbeck to form "Norton, Cuckney, Holbeck and Welbeck".

== St Winifred's Church ==
The parish church of St Winifred was built between 1913 and 1916, for the benefit of the Dukes of Portland, and as a burial place for the dukes and their families. It also contains the tombstone of Lady Ottoline Morrel.

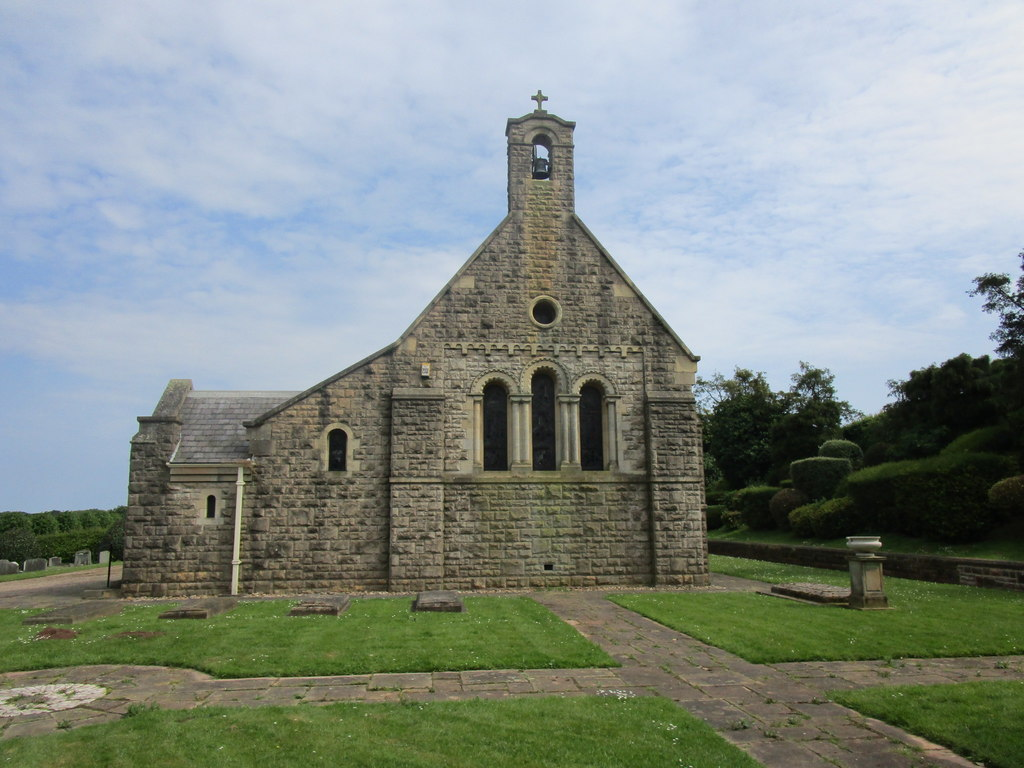
St Winifred’s Church

== Landmarks ==
A number of buildings and structures throughout the village are listed as features of historical interest, including: (all at Grade II)

- St Winifred's Church
- Several halls, farms and houses
- Monuments to Lord George Bentinck and others
