= St Winifred's Church, Holbeck =

St Winifred's Chapel, Holbeck
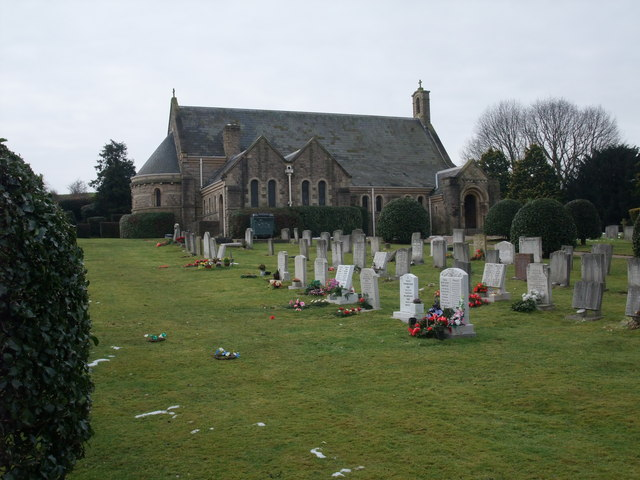
- St Winifred's Chapel, Holbeck
- St Winifred's Chapel, Holbeck
- 53°15′11.79″N 1°10′55.90″W
- OS grid reference: SK 54662 73250
- Location: Holbeck, Nottinghamshire
- Country: England
- Denomination: Church of England

History
- Founder: Duke of Portland
- Dedication: St Winifred

Architecture
- Heritage designation: Grade II listed
- Architect: Mr. McIntyre
- Groundbreaking: 1913
- Completed: 1916

Administration
- Diocese: Diocese of Southwell and Nottingham
- Archdeaconry: Newark
- Deanery: Bassetlaw and Bawtry
- Parish: Holbeck

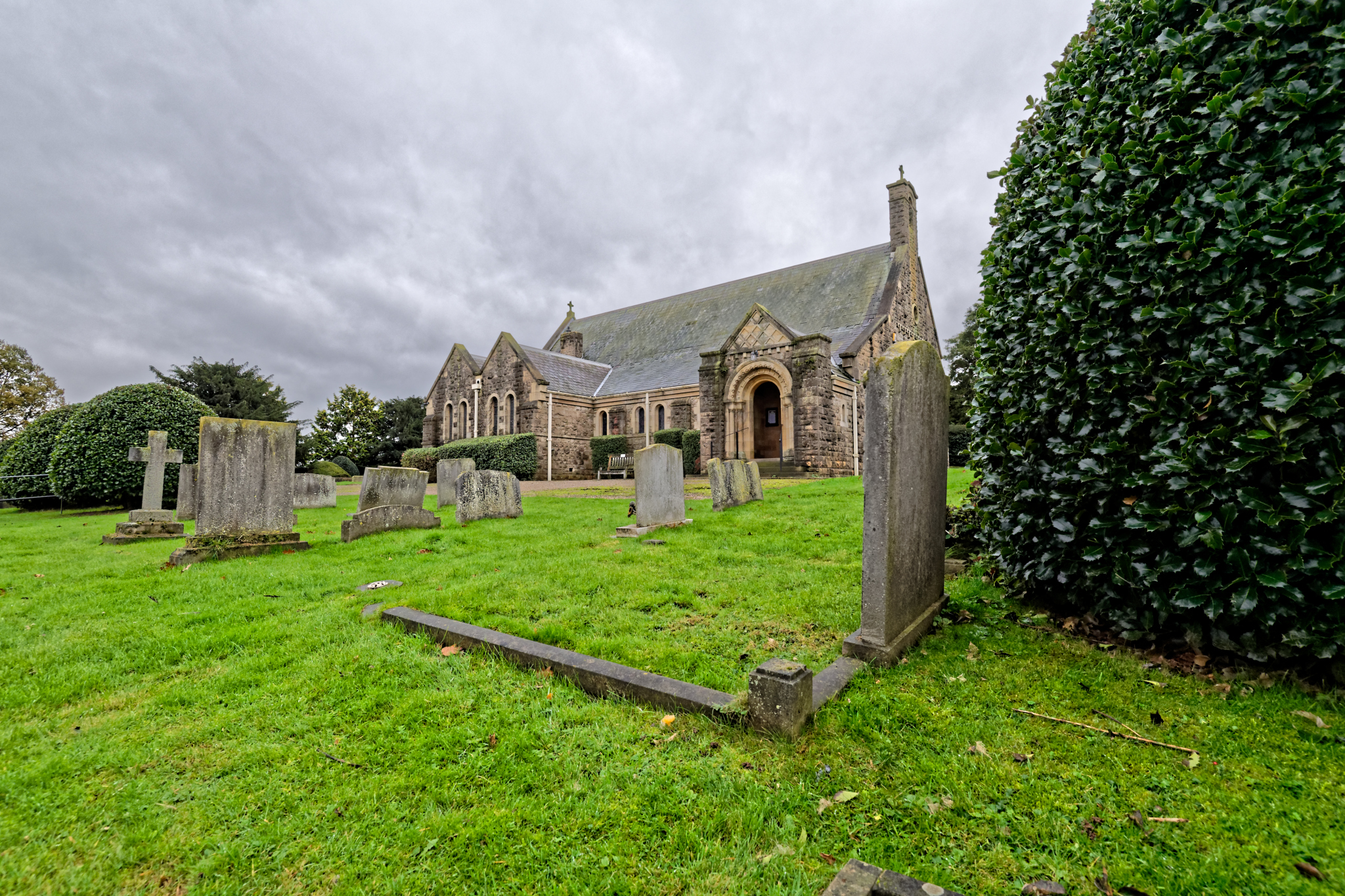
St Winifreds, Holbeck

St Winifred's Chapel, Holbeck is a Grade II listed parish church and former private chapel in the Church of England in Holbeck, Nottinghamshire, south-west of Worksop. Holbeck is an estate village built for the Dukes of Portland at Welbeck Abbey.

== History ==
St Winifred's Church was built between 1913 and 1916 to designs of Mr. McIntyre, approved with a few modifications, by Louis Ambler for the 6th Duke of Portland. Based on Steetley, Derbyshire.

It is in a joint parish with

- St Mary's Church, Norton Cuckney
- Welbeck Abbey Chapel

== Portland family tombs ==
St Winifred's Church was the traditional burial place of the Dukes of Portland at Welbeck Abbey and their families, most of whom are interred in the small churchyard. Those buried here include:

- The 6th Duke of Portland (1857–1943)
- The 7th Duke of Portland (1893–1977)
- Ivy Cavendish-Bentinck, Duchess of Portland (1887–1982), née Gordon-Lennox
- The 9th Duke of Portland (1897–1990), at whose death the dukedom became extinct

Most of their predecessors are buried in London: the 1st Duke and the 2nd Duke in Westminster Abbey, the 3rd Duke in St Marylebone Parish Church and the 5th Duke in Kensal Green Cemetery. The 4th Duke was interred in the ancient Cavendish vault, which had previously been unopened for 138 years.

== Memorials ==
In addition to the graves of the Dukes of Portland, St Winifred's Church also contains memorials for several other people:

- Lady Ottoline Morrell 1939 by Eric Gill, north aisle wall
- Major Lord William Augustus Cavendish Bentinck, south chancel wall

== Organ ==
The church contains a pipe organ by Albert Keates. A specification of the organ can be found on the National Pipe Organ Register.

== See also ==
- Listed buildings in Holbeck, Nottinghamshire
