= Listed buildings in Norton, Cuckney, Holbeck and Welbeck =

Norton, Cuckney, Holbeck and Welbeck is a civil parish in the Bassetlaw District of Nottinghamshire, England. The parish contains 96 listed buildings that are recorded in the National Heritage List for England. Of these, three are listed at Grade I, the highest of the three grades, four at Grade II*, the middle grade, and the remaining 89 are at Grade II, the lowest grade.

The parish contains Welbeck, a historic country estate owned by a long established local family, and its former estate villages of Holbeck, Cuckney and Norton along with their surrounding countryside.

The key buildings are Welbeck Abbey, the country house for the estate and St Mary's Church, both listed at Grade I. Notable structures include buildings in the gardens or grounds of the abbey, a school, a dam, a public house, a number of lodges, church lychgate and monuments in the churchyard. Other listed buildings are houses, cottages, farmhouses and former stables, dairies, a former laundry, a former rectory, almshouses, and a telephone kiosk.

== Key ==
Grade	Criteria
I	Buildings of exceptional interest, sometimes considered to be internationally important
II*	Particularly important buildings of more than special interest
II	Buildings of national importance and special interest

== Buildings ==
Name and location	Photograph	Date	Notes	Grade
St Mary's Church, Norton Cuckney; 53.23655°N 1.15298°W		12th century	The church has been altered and extended through the centuries. It is built in stone with some brick, and has slate roofs. The church consists of a nave, a north aisle, a south porch, a chancel, a north vestry and a west tower. The tower has two stages, a plinth with a moulded band, quoins, a clasping stair turret on the southwest, a string course, seven gargoyles, and an embattled parapet with eight crocketed pinnacles. There is an arched west doorway with a chamfered surround and a hood mould, above which is a two-light window, two clock faces, and two-light bell openings with hood moulds.	I
Welbeck Abbey, picture gallery, chapel and library 53.26222°N 1.15573°W		12th century	A country house on the site of a Premonstratensian abbey that has been altered and enlarged many times through the centuries, including work by Humphry Repton and John Carr. It is built in stone with moulded copper tile roofs. The main range has two storeys, attics and a basement and 14 bays flanked by three-storey pavilions, and it is linked by a curving picture gallery wing to a chapel and a library. The middle three bays project under a pediment, and in the centre is an ornate porte-cochère. Most of the windows are sashes, and there are some mullioned casements. The north front has two storeys and 13 bays, and a balustrade, and it contains a three-storey tower and a domed lantern. The south front has three storeys and 17 bays and contains four-storey towers and pavilions.	I
Cuckney School; 53.23306°N 1.16208°W		1723	The school, originally a mill, is in stone on a plinth, with quoins, and a hipped slate roof. There are three storeys and eight bays. Most of the windows are casements with splayed lintels, those in the central bay also with keystones. On the left is a single-storey single-bay brick extension, and at the rear are later brick additions.	II
Cuckney House; 53.23343°N 1.15789°W		Early 18th century	The house is in stone on a plinth, and has a parapet with a cornice, and a hipped slate roof. There are two storeys and an attic, and five bays. In the centre of the front is a recess containing a doorway with half-columns, a segmental fanlight, and an arched band. The windows on the front are sashes with keystones, and in the attic is a box dormer. At the rear are two bay windows.	II
Smith's Cottage; 53.25512°N 1.18560°W		Early 18th century	The cottage, which was heightened in the 19th century, has a ground floor in stone, an upper floor in red brick, and a pantile roof. There are two storeys and three bays. In the centre is a doorway flanked by horizontally-sliding sash windows, all under segmental brick arches, and in the upper floor are casement windows To the left and recessed is a single-storey three-bay extension, and further to the left is a single-bay outbuilding.	II
1 and 2 Parkers Row; 53.23467°N 1.15856°W		Mid 18th century	A pair of rendered cottages on a stone plinth, with a floor band, and a pantile roof with a rendered coped gable and a stone kneeler on the left. There are two storeys and attics, six bays, and lower two-storey rear extensions. Each cottage has a central doorway, and most of the windows are sashes.	II
Chapel and Titchfield Library; 53.26299°N 1.15707°W	—	Mid 18th century	A service wing converted into a chapel and a library, it is in stone on a plinth, with a raised eaves band, an embattled parapet, and a copper roof with a decorative ridge, stone coped gables, decorative finials and ornate clock cupolas. There are two storeys and 15 bays. The central doorway has a vermiculated rusticated surround, a fanlight with an arched head, and a keystone, flanked by iron lamp brackets. Also on the front are sash windows, and two further doorways, all with raised eared architraves.	I
Former cartshed and outbuilding, Holbeck Hall Farm 53.25424°N 1.18678°W	—	Mid 18th century	The farm buildings are in stone. The cartshed has a roof, corrugated at the front and pantile at the rear. There is a single storey and five bays. Attached to the right is a later single-storey outbuilding with four bays, a raised eaves band and a pantile roof.	II
Greendale Cottage; 53.23513°N 1.15350°W		Mid 18th century	The cottage is rendered, and has red brick dentilled eaves, and a pantile roof with coped gables and kneelers. There are two storeys and attics, three bays, a lean-to on the right with a slate roof, and lean-to extensions at the rear. The doorway is in the centre and the windows are sashes.	II
Pair of lodges flanking North Drive, Welbeck Abbey; 53.26303°N 1.16128°W	—	Mid 18th century	The lodges are in stone on a plinth, and have a moulded band under an embattled parapet. Each lodge has a single storey, a single bay with a projecting bay on each side, and a rectangular plan. The doorways at the front are surrounded by a raised band, and have an ogee arch with a finial, at the rear is a sash window in a similar surround, and on the front facing the drive is a quatrefoil.	II*
Pair of lodges flanking South Drive, Welbeck Abbey; 53.26149°N 1.15933°W	—	Mid 18th century	The lodges are in stone on a plinth, and have a moulded band under an embattled parapet. Each lodge has a single storey, a single bay with a projecting bay on each side, and a rectangular plan. The doorways at the front are surrounded by a raised band, and have an ogee arch with a finial, at the rear is a dummy window in a similar surround, and on the front facing the drive is a quatrefoil. Attached to the road side bay is a single wrought iron, hollow, decorative pier, with coping surmounted by a with decorative scroll.	II*
Pair of lodges flanking the entrance to Glass Court Drive, tunnel entrance and wall 53.26321°N 1.15782°W	—	Mid 18th century	The lodges are in stone on a plinth, and have a moulded band under an embattled parapet. Each lodge has a single storey, a single bay with a projecting bay on each side, and a rectangular plan. The doorways at the front are surrounded by a raised band, and have an ogee arch with a finial, at the rear is a sash window in a similar surround, and on the front facing the drive is a quatrefoil. To the rear of the west lodge is a rusticated and coped wall ending at the tunnel entrance. This has a plinth, impost bands, and a panelled parapet. It contains a large carriage archway with a rusticated surround, shaped voussoirs and a keystone. Over it is a moulded band, and it is flanked by pilasters with urns. Attached is a rusticated and coped wall on a plinth, ending in a coped pilaster with an orb.	II*
Pear Tree Cottages; 53.24343°N 1.14393°W	—	Mid 18th century	A house divided into two cottages, in red brick on a plinth, with a floor band, a dentilled and dogtooth eaves band and a pantile roof. There are two storeys and an attic, and three bays, and at the rear are a lower two-storey extension and a lean-to. In the centre is a segmental arch containing a recessed porch with doorways in the side walls. The windows are mullioned and transomed casements under segmental arches.	II
Sabroan Cottage and The Old Orchard Cottage; 53.25409°N 1.18651°W	—	Mid 18th century	A pair of stone cottages with a tile roof, two storeys and attics, and six bays. On the front are two doorways and horizontally-sliding sash windows, and at the rear are single and two-storey wings and extensions.	II
Wall, fountain lions, seat and summer house southwest of Welbeck Abbey; 53.26143°N 1.15818°W	—	Mid 18th century	The stone coped garden wall runs to the north and the west. Set into the west wall is a stone and marble fountain with two lions standing on the coping, and a curved garden seat with scrolled arms and on claw feet behind. The wall ends in a pedimented summer house, with a copper roof, a single storey and three bays. It contains a loggia with Doric columns, a triglyph and a modillion cornice. The central doorway is flanked by single arched fixed lights.	II
Dam, Cuckney Mill; 53.23300°N 1.16245°W		18th century	The dam is in stone, and extends for 170 metres (560 ft) around three sides of the mill pond. It ends to the south with a red brick boathouse, and there are four sets of sluice gates to the east and west. It is enclosed intermittently by iron railings with alternate spikes and fleuron.	II
5, 6 and 7 Maltkiln Row; 53.23436°N 1.15950°W		Late 18th century	A row of three mill workers' cottages in stone, with quoins and a pantile roof. There are three storeys and attics, and eight bays. Each cottage has a doorway, one with a fanlight, and the windows are a mix of casements and horizontally-sliding sashes. All the openings have stone lintels, and in the attic are two gabled dormers.	II
1 and 2 Pack Horse Row; 53.24006°N 1.14561°W		Late 18th century	A public house, later two cottages, rendered, with a raised eaves band and a pantile roof. There are two storeys and four bays. The doorway has a stone surround and a hood. The windows flanking the doorway, and the upper floor window in the first bay, are tripartite horizontally-sliding sashes, in the third bay is a gabled dormer with a tripartite casement, and the fourth bay contains a single sash window.	II
1–5 School Lane; 53.23288°N 1.16174°W		Late 18th century	A row of five, later four, mill workers' cottages in stone, with quoins and a hipped pantile roof. The main range has two storeys and attics, and nine bays, and the left cottage has two storeys and two bays. Each cottage has a doorway, the windows are sashes, and all the openings in the lower two floors have flush splayed lintels.	II
3–10 Ten Row; 53.23531°N 1.15568°W		Late 18th century	A terrace of eight mill worker's cottages in stone with quoins and a pantile roof. There are two storeys and attics and 16 bays. Each cottage has a doorway, and to the left is a casement window in each floor, the window in the ground floor mullioned and transomed.	II
Barn, cartshed and outbuildings opposite Woodhouse Hall; 53.25418°N 1.17847°W	—	Late 18th century	The farm buildings have tile roofs. The barn is in stone with two storeys, and contains doorways and vents. On the left is a lean-to with quoins, and two carriage arches with imposts. Attached to the barn are brick extension, and a two-storey four-bay outbuilding.	II
Former barn, Holbeck Hall Farm; 53.25432°N 1.18712°W	—	Late 18th century	The former barn is in stone with a corrugated roof. There are two storeys and nine bays. It contains doorways, some with quoined surrounds, a casement window, a horizontally-sliding sash window and slit vents.	II
Hatfield Farmhouse; 53.24153°N 1.14482°W		Late 18th century	The farmhouse is in stone on a plinth, and has a pantile roof. There are two storeys, a double depth plan, three bays, a lean-to with a tile roof on the left, and rear extensions. The central doorway has a stone surround and a hood, and the windows are sashes.	II
Home Farm; 53.24250°N 1.14429°W	—	Late 18th century	The house is in stone with a pantile roof. There are two storeys and three bays, and lower two-storey rear extensions. The central doorway has a fanlight, above it is a recessed panel, and the windows are sashes, all with splayed lintels and keystones.	II
Low Hatfield Grange Farmhouse; 53.23737°N 1.13789°W	—	Late 18th century	A house in red brick with dentilled eaves, and a slate roof with a brick coped left gable and kneeler. There are two storeys, five bays, and a two-storey single-bay extension on the right. The central doorway has a stone surround, the ground floor windows are sashes, and in the upper floor are horizontally-sliding sash windows.	II
Norton House; 53.24154°N 1.14531°W		Late 18th century	Three cottages combined into a house, it is in stone on a plinth, and has a hipped tile roof. There are two storeys, four bays, and two-storey rear extensions. The windows are tripartite sashes, the middle window in the ground floor has a wooden lintel, and the others have segmental heads.	II
Pair of ice houses 53.25811°N 1.15486°W	—	Late 18th century	The ice houses in the grounds of Welbeck Abbey are in stone, and have three entrances, all blocked. There are three ventilators, the left with an iron cap, the middle one with a ventilator shaft in red brick and stone, and the right with a shaft in blue brick.	II
Rookeries; 53.24305°N 1.14436°W	—	Late 18th century	A rendered cottage with a raised eaves band and a slate roof. There are two storeys and three bays. It contains a central doorway and horizontally-sliding sash windows, all the ground floor openings with segmental arches. There is a lean-to extension to the right and two-storey extensions at the rear.	II
The Cottage and Meadow View; 53.23549°N 1.15602°W	—	Late 18th century	A pair of stone cottages, the right cottage painted, with pantile roofs, one storey and attics, and four bays, containing horizontally-sliding sash windows. To the right is a lower wing in stone and brick, with one storey and attics and two bays, containing a casement window and two sash windows. To the left is a later, taller two-storey single-bay wing with sash windows under segmental arches.	II
The Greendale Oak Inn; 53.23543°N 1.15345°W		Late 18th century	The public house, which was extended in the 19th century, is in stone on a rendered plinth, with quoins and a pantile roof. There are two storeys and an attic, and three bays. The windows are sashes, and on the left are external coped steps with an iron handrail. To the right is a rendered two-storey extension on a plinth, with a hipped tile roof, and mullioned and transomed casement windows.	II
The Old Hall; 53.25452°N 1.18611°W	—	Late 18th century	The house is in stone with a raised eaves band and a tile roof. There are two storeys and four bays, the right two bays gabled, and to the left are extensions. The doorway has a fanlight and an open porch with decorative bargeboards, and the windows are sashes.	II
The Ulvers; 53.23527°N 1.15290°W		Late 18th century	The house is rendered, on a plinth, with a slate roof. There are two storeys and an attic, and three bays. The central doorway has an overlight, a traceried fanlight, and side windows. The other windows are sashes, those in the ground floor and above the doorway are tripartite with mullions, and the others have a single light. To the right, and lower, is a two-storey rendered wing with a pantile roof, a tripartite casement window, and a lean-to.	II
Woodhouse Hall; 53.25503°N 1.17843°W	—	Late 18th century	The house is in stone, mainly roughcast, with quoins, a raised eaves band, and a tile roof with stone coped gables, kneelers and a finial. There are two storeys and attics, and four bays, the right bay projecting and gabled. The doorway has a chamfered surround and marginal lights, and the windows are mullioned casements with hood moulds. To the left and recessed is a single-storey single-bay wing with a coped parapet.	II
Farmstead, farmhouse and barn, Hazel Gap Farm; 53.23575°N 1.10979°W		c. 1790	The buildings form a U-shaped plan, with the farmstead and farmhouse parallel, and the barn at the rear. At the ends of the farmstead and farmhouse facing the road are pavilions, and all are in red brick with pantile roofs. On the front and sides of the pavilions are two round arches with imposts. The barn is also in red brick and has dogtooth eaves and a large blocked opening.	II
1–4 Bakers Row; 53.23383°N 1.16044°W		Early 19th century	A row of four cottages in stone, rendered on the front, with a slate roof. There are three storeys, nine bays, and a rear lean-to extension. Each cottage has a doorway, and the windows are sashes.	II
1 Carburton Road; 53.24194°N 1.14452°W		Early 19th century	A cottage in red brick with a dentilled eaves band and a pantile roof. There are two storeys, three bays, and a rear lean-to extension. In the centre is a doorway, the windows are horizontally-sliding sashes, and all the openings have segmental heads.	II
3 Pack Horse Row; 53.24014°N 1.14560°W		Early 19th century	A stone cottage with a slate roof, two storeys and two bays. In the right bay is a doorway, and the windows are sashes with lintels.	II
8 and 9 Maltkiln Row; 53.23444°N 1.15929°W		Early 19th century	A pair of mill worker's cottages in stone with a pantile roof. There are two storeys and attics, and four bays. Each cottage has a doorway in the outer bay, most of the windows are horizontally-sliding sashes, and there is one casement window. All the openings have painted lintels, and in the attic are two gabled dormers.	II
2 Ten Row; 53.23534°N 1.15605°W		Early 19th century	A pair of mill workers' cottages, later combined into one, at the end of a terrace, in stone, with quoins and a pantile roof. There are two storeys and four bays. On the front are two doorways, one blocked, and horizontally-sliding sash windows.	II
Brooms Cottage; 53.24022°N 1.14588°W		Early 19th century	The cottage is rendered, and has dentilled eaves and a pantile roof. There are two storeys and two bays. The doorway is in the right bay, and the windows are sashes.	II
Collingthwaite Farmhouse; 53.24216°N 1.17601°W		Early 19th century	The farmhouse is in stone, on a plinth, with overhanging eaves and a hipped slate roof. There are two storeys and an L-shaped plan, with a front of three bays. The doorway is in the centre, the windows are sashes, and all the openings are under segmental arches.	II
Hillside Cottage; 53.25526°N 1.18491°W		Early 19th century	Two cottages, later combined into one, it is in stone with quoins and a pantile roof. There are two storeys, a three-bay range, a lower two-bay range to the right, and to the left is a single-storey two-bay extension. Most of the windows are casements.	II
Outbuilding, cartshed and barn, Collingthwaite Farm; 53.24239°N 1.17551°W	—	Early 19th century	The farm buildings are in stone and brick, the barn has a pantile roof, and the other roofs are corrugated. The cartshed has two storeys and four brick arches with stone imposts, and the outbuilding contains doorways and casement windows. The barn has two storeys and lofts, and contains a large archway with a quoined surround and a keystone, doorways and vents.	II
Park House Farmhouse; 53.22390°N 1.16385°W	—	Early 19th century	The farmhouse is in painted red brick on a plinth, with dentilled eaves and a slate roof. There are two storeys and an attic, three bays, a lean-to on the left, and two-storey rear extensions. The central doorway has a fanlight, and the windows are sashes with segmental-arched heads.	II
Struan Cottage; 53.24221°N 1.14439°W	—	Early 19th century	A stone cottage with a raised eaves band and a pantile roof. There are two storeys and three bays. The central doorway has a fanlight, above it is a recessed panel, and the windows are sashes with moulded surrounds. To the left is a single-storey, two-bay brick extension with a slate roof, and at the rear are single-storey, single-bay brick extensions.	II
The Vicarage; 53.23676°N 1.15022°W		Early 19th century	A rendered house on a stone plinth, with a raised eaves band, and a hipped slate roof projecting over the eaves. There are two storeys and three bays. The central doorway has a decorative fanlight, and the windows are sashes. Projecting from the right is a single-storey extension with a hipped pantile roof.	II
Woodend Cottage and outbuilding 53.24270°N 1.18817°W	—	Early 19th century	The cottage and outbuilding are in stone, with a raised eaves band and a pantile roof. The cottage has two storeys and an L-shaped plan, with a front range of two bays, and to the right is an outbuilding with one storey and a loft. Both parts contain casement windows, and in the outbuilding are vents.	II
Norton Grange; 53.24407°N 1.14468°W	—	c. 1840	A stone house with quoins, and a tile roof projecting over the eaves on wooden brackets. There are two storeys, three bays, the middle bay gabled, and lower two-storey rear wings. The central doorway has a fanlight, the windows are sashes, and all the openings have splayed lintels and keystones.	II
Entrance walls and piers west of Welbeck Abbey; 53.26202°N 1.15815°W	—	Mid 19th century	Flanking the entrance to the house is a pair of rusticated stone piers on shaped bases, with copper lamps, and at the top is moulded coping surmounted by lions. Extending from the piers on each side is a curved balustraded wall, meeting a small rusticated pier with a copper lamp, continuing at a right angle and ending at another similar pier. Nearer to the house is a pair of similar piers.	II
Glass Court, Camelia House and tunnel entrance 53.26343°N 1.15699°W	—	Mid 19th century	The workshops are in stone, with a moulded eaves band and a slate roof. There is a single storey and 18 bays. Alternating bays contain a doorway with rusticated jambs, and sash windows with eared architraves and keystones. Projecting from the left is Camelia House in glass and iron, with a single storey and three bays. At its rear is a stone wall with a balustraded parapet containing a carriage archway with imposts and a vermiculated keystone and similar voussoirs. There is also an arched doorway flanked by vermiculated rusticated pilasters, and a plain frieze.	II
Grotto; 53.26298°N 1.15619°W	—	Mid 19th century	The grotto in the grounds of Welbeck Abbey is in rough hewn rock. Walls flank the 21 steps down to the arched entrance. Inside, there are single rooms leading off to the right and left.	II
The Kennels, Norton Road; 53.24522°N 1.16157°W	—	Mid 19th century	A pair of stone houses on a plinth with slate roofs, and gables with decorative bargeboards and finials. There are two storeys, and a front range of seven bays, the middle three bays projecting under a gable. The central doorway has a fanlight, and the windows are casements. At the rear are two wings, with four bays, the south bay gabled, quoins, and a gabled porch.	II
The Kennels and linking kennels, Worksop Road; 53.24664°N 1.16301°W	—	Mid 19th century	Two cottages linked to kennels, in stone, with slate roofs and gables with bargeboards and finials. There is a single storey, nine bays at the front, and two-storey, single-bay gabled wings. The doorways and the windows, which are casements, have quoined surrounds. The south front has a rendered plinth, and contains six two-bay kennels divided by stone walls with triangular coping, and cast iron railings with decorative spikes, and at the rear is a similar wall. The cottages have sash windows and a mullioned casement.	II
Tunnel entrance, wall and gateway to Glass Court; 53.26366°N 1.15749°W	—	Mid 19th century	The tunnel entrance is in stone on a plinth, and has impost bands and a moulded parapet. It contains a large carriageway with a keystone, flanked by rusticated pilasters. Attached to each side is a curved coped wall on a plinth with cast iron brackets. On the right is the entrance to Glass Court, which has a coped flat arch flanked by square piers with orb finials.	II
Wall and gateway north of Welbeck Abbey; 53.26289°N 1.15640°W	—	Mid 19th century	The wall is in stone, it is coped, and has 20 bays. Between each bay is a rusticated pilaster, and each bay contains two recessed blind arches with keystones on squat piers. The gateway has a central vermiculated rusticated pier with an orb. On the right is a decorative iron gate, the left gate is missing, and they are flanked by similar piers surmounted by pedestals.	II
Walls, fountains, summer houses and other ornaments south and west of Welbeck Abbey; 53.26227°N 1.15480°W	—	Mid 19th century	The gardens to the south and east of the house have stone balustraded walls containing decorative iron gates. In the south garden is a large copper, marble and stone fountain decorated with cherubs, garlands and mythical heads. The east garden is terraced, and contains decorated terracotta urns, curved and decorated stone seats, lead and stone figures, and a large stone and copper fountain with cherubs' heads, surmounted by a figure and a swan. To the north are two summer houses, the western one with a curved colonnade, a triglyph and a dentilled cornice. The eastern summer house has a semicircular plan, a gabled copper roof, and a central wooden arch with a keystone and decorative ironwork.	II
Abbot House and Hamlyn Lodge; 53.26129°N 1.16772°W	—	c. 1860	A lodge and workshops in stone on a plinth, with a moulded eaves band, and a tile roof with a decorative copper ridge and stone coped gables with kneelers and orb finials. There are two storeys and an attic, and five bays, the outer bays projecting and gabled. In the middle bay is an open three-bay arcade with keystones and a strapwork parapet with orb finials. The flanking bays contain three-bay arcaded porches and inner doorways. The windows are mullioned casements with hood moulds, and here are two gabled dormers. Recessed to the right is a single-storey seven-bay wing with three Tudor arched doorways.	II
Bentinck Lodge; 53.24173°N 1.12748°W		c. 1860	A lodge on the estate of Welbeck Abbey, in stone on a plinth, with quoins, and a decorative tile roof that has gables with decorative bargeboards, finials and pendants. There are two storeys and three bays. The middle bay on the front projects under a gable, and in the lower floor is an arcaded porch on cast iron columns. The doorway has a chamfered surround, and above the porch is a cast iron modillion cornice. The windows are mullioned and transomed casements.	II
Bunkers Hill Lodge and gateway 53.24629°N 1.14843°W		c. 1860	A lodge on the estate of Welbeck Abbey, in stone on a plinth, with quoins, and a decorative tile roof that has gables with decorative bargeboards, finials and pendants. There are two storeys and three bays. The middle bay on the front projects under a gable, and in the lower floor is an arcaded porch on cast iron columns. The doorway has a chamfered surround, and above the porch is a cast iron modillion cornice. The windows are mullioned and transomed casements. Flanking the drive are double iron gates with fretwork and a band of the family shield, and the gate piers are in open ironwork with coping and the family crest. These are flanked by similar iron screens, and to the left is a single coped stone pier and a coped stone wall, both on plinths.	II
Club House and Cottage, north of Headmaster's House; 53.26248°N 1.17078°W		c. 1860	The building is in stone on a plinth, with a moulded eaves band, and a shaped tiled roof with a decorative copper ridge, and coped gables, kneelers and orb finials. There are two storeys and a south front of five bays, the middle and outer bays projecting and gabled. In the centre is a four-light casement window, flanked by three-bay arcades with keystones and a decorative parapet. Elsewhere, there are more casement windows and gabled half-dormers.	II
College Hospital and wall 53.26141°N 1.16802°W	—	c. 1860	A school later used for other purposes, it is in stone on a plinth, with a moulded eaves band, and a shaped tile roof with a decorative copper ridge and stone coped gables with kneelers and orb finials. There are two storeys and an attic, and five bays, the outer and middle bays projecting and gabled, the middle gable shaped. In the centre is a casement window in a recessed panel with a rusticated surround and a keystone. Above it is an oriel window with decorative strapwork, flanked by oeil-de-boeufs, and the other windows are casements with quoined surrounds, mullions and hood moulds. To the left is a stone coped wall containing a window and a Tudor arched doorway with a hood mould.	II
Corunna Lodge; 53.24182°N 1.12356°W		c. 1860	A lodge on the estate of Welbeck Abbey, in stone on a plinth, with quoins, and a decorative tile roof that has gables with decorative bargeboards, finials and pendants. There are two storeys and three bays. The middle bay on the front projects under a gable, and in the lower floor is an arcaded porch on cast iron columns. The doorway has a chamfered surround, and above the porch is a cast iron modillion cornice. The windows are mullioned and transomed casements.	II
Forge Lodge; 53.24382°N 1.11048°W		c. 1860	A lodge on the estate of Welbeck Abbey, in stone on a plinth, with quoins, and a decorative tile roof that has gables with decorative bargeboards, finials and pendants. There are two storeys and three bays. The middle bay on the front projects under a gable, and in the lower floor is an arcaded porch on cast iron columns. The doorway has a chamfered surround, and above the porch is a cast iron modillion cornice. The windows are mullioned and transomed casements.	II
Four dairies and gateway 53.26081°N 1.16932°W	—	c. 1860	There are four dairies, with variations. The north dairy is in stone with slate roofs, shaped coped gables, kneelers and orb finials. It is on a plinth, and has two storeys and five bays. Attached to it is a coped wall on a plinth ending in a coped pier, and a gateway is formed by this pier together with a corresponding pier.	II
Gibraltar Lodge; 53.24398°N 1.10427°W		c. 1860	A lodge on the estate of Welbeck Abbey, in stone on a plinth, with quoins, and a decorative tile roof that has gables with decorative bargeboards, finials and pendants. There are two storeys and three bays. The middle bay on the front projects under a gable, and in the lower floor is an arcaded porch on cast iron columns. The doorway has a chamfered surround, and above the porch is a cast iron modillion cornice. The windows are mullioned and transomed casements.	II
Headmaster's House; 53.26225°N 1.17073°W		c. 1860	The house is in stone on a plinth, with a moulded eaves band, and a shaped tiled roof with a decorative copper ridge, and coped gables, kneelers and orb finials. There are two storeys and a south front of five bays, the middle and outer bays projecting and gabled, the middle gable shaped. In the middle bay is a casement window with a fanlight, a recessed panel with a rusticated arched surround and a bracketed keystone, and above it is an oriel window. To the left is a doorway with a moulded surround, a fanlight and a hood mould. The other windows are mullioned with hood moulds.	II
Laundry Cottage, Laundry Lodge and wall 53.26212°N 1.17265°W		c. 1860	A laundry, later converted into a house and a lodge, it is in stone on plinths, with moulded eaves bands, and a shaped tile roof with coped gables, kneelers, orb finials and a cupola. There is a single storey and attics. The house has seven bays, one bay projecting with a shaped gable, the flanking bays each with a balustraded and decorative parapet. Projecting from the house is a lodge with three bays, the middle bay projecting and gabled, and it contains a doorway with a Tudor arch. The windows in both parts are casements, some with mullions, and most with hood moulds. Attached are coped walls with a decorated cornice, and five entrances flanked by rusticated pilasters, some with flat arches and some surmounted by urns.	II
Milnthorpe Lodge; 53.24446°N 1.13551°W		c. 1860	A lodge on the estate of Welbeck Abbey, in stone on a plinth, with quoins, and a decorative tile roof that has gables with decorative bargeboards, finials and pendants. There are two storeys and three bays. The middle bay on the front projects under a gable, and in the lower floor is an arcaded porch on cast iron columns. The doorway has a chamfered surround, and above the porch is a cast iron modillion cornice. The windows are mullioned and transomed casements.	II
Millwood Lodge; 53.27261°N 1.17552°W	—	c. 1860	The lodge is in stone on a plinth, with quoins and a decorated tile roof. There are two storeys and three bays. The upper floor of the middle bay projects over cast iron columns, under which is an arcaded porch with a cast iron modillion cornice, and the doorway has a chamfered surround. The windows are mullioned and transomed casements, the middle window in the upper floor with a Tudor hood mould. The flanking windows are gabled, with bargeboards, finials and pendants.	II
Motor Yard, Bursars Court, Japonica Lodge and attached buildings 53.26179°N 1.17029°W		c. 1860	A group of stone buildings on a plinth, with moulded eaves bands, and a shaped tile roof with coped gables, kneelers and orb finials. They have a single storey and attics, and form a quadrangle, and a projecting wing and lodge form an adjacent small quadrangle. The buildings contain a carriage archway with a vermiculated rusticated surround and a keystone, flanked by vermiculated rusticated pilasters carrying an architrave with half-finials, and the doorways are round-headed with rusticated surrounds and keystones. The east front has 13 bays, two of them projecting and gabled, and the lodge has three bays. The windows are a mix of sashes and casements.	II
Park Lodge; 53.24862°N 1.15535°W		c. 1860	The lodge is in stone on a plinth, with quoins and a decorated tile roof. There are two storeys and three bays. The upper floor of the middle bay projects over cast iron columns, under which is an arcaded porch with a cast iron modillion cornice, and the doorway has a chamfered surround. The windows are mullioned and transomed casements, the middle window in the upper floor with a Tudor hood mould. The flanking windows are gabled, with bargeboards, finials and pendants.	II
Pair of lodges, walls and piers 53.26125°N 1.16823°W	—	c. 1860	The lodges are in stone, and each has a shaped tile roof with three coped gables, kneelers and orb finials. They have two storeys and attics, and fronts of three bays. In the centre is a doorway with a chamfered surround, a Tudor arch and a hood mould. The windows are casements with hood moulds, those in the upper floor mullioned. Attached to the lodges are coped walls on plinths, ending in coped piers, and attached to the left lodge is a wall containing a doorway with a chamfered surround and a Tudor arch.	II
Shrubbery Lodge; 53.26625°N 1.16002°W	—	c. 1860	The lodge is in stone on a plinth, with quoins and a decorated tile roof. There are two storeys and three bays. The upper floor of the middle bay projects over cast iron columns, under which is an arcaded porch with a cast iron modillion cornice, and the doorway has a chamfered surround. The windows are mullioned and transomed casements, the middle window in the upper floor with a Tudor hood mould. The flanking windows are gabled, with bargeboards, finials and pendants.	II
South Carr Lodge; 53.24343°N 1.15828°W		c. 1860	A lodge on the estate of Welbeck Abbey, in stone on a plinth, with quoins, and a decorative tile roof that has gables with decorative bargeboards, finials and pendants. There are two storeys and three bays. The middle bay on the front projects under a gable, and in the lower floor is an arcaded porch on cast iron columns. The doorway has a chamfered surround, and above the porch is a cast iron modillion cornice. The windows are mullioned and transomed casements.	II
Stable Court; 53.26211°N 1.17161°W		c. 1860	The stables, which have been converted into flats, are in stone on a plinth, with moulded eaves bands, and shaped tile roofs with coped gables, kneelers and orb finials. There is a single storey and attics, and four ranges round a quadrangle, with fronts of eleven bays. The middle bay of the south front projects, it is gabled, and has a decorative cupola and a weathervane. It contains a large carriage entrance with a vermiculated rusticated surround and a keystone, flanked by vermiculated rusticated pilasters carrying an architrave with half-finials. Above it is a sash window with a keystone, a scroll at each corner, and a hood on consoles, over which is a clock face. The outer bays contain blind rusticated arches with keystones, impost bands and fanlights, and in the upper floor are sash windows.	II
Stables, lodges, walls, piers and outbuildings 53.26104°N 1.17041°W		c. 1860	The buildings are in stone, and have tile roofs with decorative copper ridges, and coped gables with kneelers. In the centre is a three-storey pavilion with floor bands, a moulded cornice and a shaped roof, containing an arched doorway with a rusticated surround. This is flanked by seven single-storey bays with arcades containing casement windows with mullions and hood moulds. Each lodge contains a Tudor arched doorway and casement windows, and extending from them are coped wall ending in coped piers surmounted by a bird. At the front is a coped wall on a plinth, with two gate piers, one with an orb, containing a Tudor arched doorway. At the rear are outbuildings, each containing a doorway with a quoined surround.	II
Tile Kiln Wood Lodge; 53.25051°N 1.17079°W		c. 1860	A lodge on the estate of Welbeck Abbey, in stone on a plinth, with quoins, and a decorative tile roof that has gables with decorative bargeboards, finials and pendants. There are two storeys and three bays. The middle bay on the front projects under a gable, and in the lower floor is an arcaded porch on cast iron columns. The doorway has a chamfered surround, and above the porch is a cast iron modillion cornice. The windows are mullioned and transomed casements.	II
Tunnel Entrance and walls north of the College Hospital; 53.26197°N 1.16865°W	—	c. 1860	The tunnel entrance is in stone, and it contains a central large carriage entrance with a vermiculated rusticated surround, flanked by vermiculated rusticated pilasters rising to a moulded cornice. On each side is a coped wall ending in a round pier, the left with an orb finial.	II
Welbeck Estate office 53.25987°N 1.16904°W	—	c. 1860	Originally the rectory, the office is in stone on a plinth, with a dentilled eaves band, and a shaped tile roof with decorative copper ridge, and gables with decorative bargeboards and finials. There are two storeys and an attic, and three bays, the right bay projecting and gabled. In the centre is a gabled porch, and a doorway with a pointed arch and an arched fanlight. The windows are casements, one with a mullion, and there is a dormer. To the right and recessed is a single-storey single-bay lean-to with a decorative bargeboard, and further right is a porch with a coped parapet.	II
Works Department; 53.25503°N 1.17843°W		c. 1860	This consists of a quadrangle with a lodge at each corner, joined by walls. The lodges are in stone and have shaped tile roofs with coped gables, kneelers and orb finials. They have two storeys and attics, and three bays. In the centre of each is a Tudor arched doorway with a hood mould, and the windows are casements with hood moulds, some with mullions. The north wall is coped, with seven bays, each bay containing a blind arch with a rusticated arch, and divided by vermiculated rusticated pilasters surmounted by an orb or a pineapple finial.	II
Riding School; 53.26256°N 1.16938°W	—	1869	The riding school, later converted for other purposes, is in stone, cast iron and glass, on a plinth, with a moulded eaves band and a shaped tile roof. There are two storeys, a quadrangle plan, and fronts of 19 and five bays. The middle and outer bays of the main front project under coped gables with orb finials. In the centre is a large carriage entrance with a rusticated surround and a keystone, flanked by vermiculated rusticated pilasters and an entablature with finials. The outer bays contain blind arches with rusticated surrounds and keystones. In the upper floor are fixed lights with eared surrounds and keystones.	II*
Strong Room; 53.26128°N 1.16720°W	—	c. 1870	The building is in stone on a plinth, with a moulded eaves band, and a slate roof with coped gables, kneelers and orb finials. There is a single storey and attics, and five bays, the middle bay projecting under a gable. The central doorway is arched and has a vermiculated rusticated surround and a keystone, and is flanked by vermiculated rusticated pilasters and an entablature with finials. The windows are sashes with raised surrounds and keystones, and the window above the doorway has a decorative scroll at each corner.	II
Water Department; 53.26082°N 1.16642°W	—	c. 1870	A group of service buildings in stone, with a moulded eaves band, and slate roofs with coped gables, kneelers and orb finials. There is a single storey and attics, and they form a quadrangle plan, with three ranges of seven bays, the quadrangle completed by a coped and stepped wall with buttresses. The central doorway has rusticated jambs, a flat arch and a keystone, the windows are sashes, and there is one oeil-de-boeuf with four keystones.	II
The Winnings and sundial 53.25860°N 1.17057°W		1890	A row of six almshouses in stone, with a moulded band under coped parapets, and a tile roof with shaped gables. There are two storeys and twelve bays, the middle two bays on a plinth. The porches are paired, with round-arched heads and columns, and the inner doorways have Tudor arches. The windows are casements with mullions and hood moulds, and in the roof are gabled dormers. In the apex of the central gable is a datestone and a pediment, and in all the gables is a crest. In the centre of the front garden is a sundial with cherub's heads.	II
Sunken Garden and Rose Arbor; 53.26271°N 1.15973°W	—	Late 19th century	The sunken garden contains two summer houses in red brick with rough hewn stone facing. The south summer house has a balustraded base, and the roof is supported by four herms. The other summer house has a copper roof, a pediment on columns, a modillion cornice and a clock face. Around the edges of the pools and the tennis court are coped piers. The rose arbor has partly rusticated walls, stone rose troughs and a glazed roof.	II
Weir and gateway 53.26121°N 1.15295°W	—	Late 19th century	The weir in Shrubbery Lake is crossed by a road, and at the east end is a gateway. The weir has a single central arch, and the road has balustraded parapets ending in piers with urns. The gateway is in iron, and contains gates with decorative fretwork, flanked by hollow iron piers surmounted by coping and a family crest. Outside these on each side are three sets of decorative iron screens, diminishing in size, divided by, and ending in, round piers.	II
Cricket pavilion 53.25965°N 1.15595°W	—	1908	The cricket pavilion is in stone and wood, with a moulded eaves band and a slate roof. There are two storeys and seven bays, the middle five bays projecting under a pediment containing a coat of arms. In the centre is an archway with impost blocks, a keystone and an iron gate, and stairs lead to the upper floor. The windows are casements, those in the upper floor divided by Doric columns. At the rear is a single storey and a basement and seven bays, the middle three bays under a gable containing an oval window with four keystones. The doorway has a segmental pedimented hood on wooden brackets, and the windows are the rear are sashes.	II
Monument to Lord George Bentinck; 53.24201°N 1.12719°W		1912	The monument, near the site where Lord George Bentinck died, is in stone, and consists of a square column in a paved area, partly enclosed by a semicircular wall. The column is on a plinth, and on the front is an inscribed lead tablet with a sculpted head on the top, and an apron containing a lion's head spout feeding a curved stone trough. Above the tablet is a stone shield with a coat of arms, on the sides of the column are inscribed stone plaques, and on the top is a decorated urn.	II
St Winifred's Church; 53.25343°N 1.18216°W		1913–16	The church was built for the 6th Duke of Portland. It is in stone with slate roofs, and consists of a nave, a north aisle, a north porch, a north vestry and organ chamber, and a chancel with a round apse. On the west gable is a bellcote.	II
Lych gate, St Winifred's Church; 53.25377°N 1.18162°W		1913–16	The lych gate at the entrance to the churchyard is in stone, and has a slate roof with coped gables and kneelers. It contains a round arch in a recessed panel, flanked by two engaged columns with cushion capitals and moulded imposts. There are three orders, one with chevron, one with bobbin and the other with nailhead decoration.	II
Telephone kiosk 53.26204°N 1.16975°W	—	1935	The K6 type telephone kiosk in Welbeck Estate Village was designed by Giles Gilbert Scott. Constructed in cast iron with a square plan and a dome, it has three unperforated crowns in the top panels.	II
Boat house 53.26462°N 1.15373°W	—	Early 20th century	The boat house on Shrubbery Lake is in brick, with a wood tiled roof, hipped at the rear with overhanging eaves. The exterior is clad in wood, simulating the effect of a log cabin. There is a single storey and three bays, with flanking projecting bays at the rear, and it contains three large sliding doors.	II
Monument to Augusta Mary Elizabeth Baroness Bolsover; 53.25334°N 1.18192°W	—	Early 20th century	The monument in the churchyard of St Winifred's Church consists of a low stone table tomb. It is rectangular with four bulbous feet, decorated with eight carved shields, and standing on a rectangular paved area. On the top is a decorative stylised cross carved in relief, and an inscription.	II
Monument to Elizabeth Sophia Cavendish Bentinck; 53.25333°N 1.18199°W	—	Early 20th century	The monument in the churchyard of St Winifred's Church consists of a low stone table tomb. It is rectangular with four bulbous feet, decorated with eight carved shields, and standing on a rectangular paved area. On the top is a decorative stylised cross carved in relief, and an inscription.	II
Monument to Lieutenant General Arthur Cavendish Bentinck; 53.25335°N 1.18195°W	—	Early 20th century	The monument in the churchyard of St Winifred's Church consists of a low stone table tomb. It is rectangular with four bulbous feet, standing on a rectangular paved area. The monument is decorated around the edges with grapes and vine leaves, and on the top is a stylised decorative cross in an open background with an inscription.	II
Monument to Lord William Augustus Cavendish Bentinck; 53.25334°N 1.18188°W	—	Early 20th century	The monument in the churchyard of St Winifred's Church consists of a low stone table tomb. It is rectangular with four bulbous feet, standing on a rectangular paved area. The monument is decorated around the edges with grapes and vine leaves, and on the top is a stylised decorative cross in an open background with an inscription.	II
