= William Henry Cavendish-Bentinck =

William Henry Cavendish-Bentinck may refer to:

- William Henry Cavendish Cavendish-Bentinck, 3rd Duke of Portland (1738–1809), British Whig and Tory statesman and Prime Minister
- Lord William Bentinck (1774–1839), British statesman and governor of India
- William Henry Cavendish-Bentinck, Marquess of Titchfield (1796–1824), British Member of Parliament
