= The Underground Man (novel) =

1997 novel by Mick Jackson

- First edition (publ. Picador)
- Author: Mick Jackson
- Language: English
- Publication date: 1997

The Underground Man (1997) is a novel by Mick Jackson. Critically acclaimed, it was shortlisted for the Booker Prize for that year. It shows the life of an eccentric and reclusive Victorian Duke, loosely modelled on William Cavendish-Scott-Bentinck, 5th Duke of Portland. His latest scheme involves building a set of tunnels beneath his estate.

In 2016 it was adapted for the stage by Nick Wood for Nottingham Playhouse.
