= Harcourt House, London =

Former palatial residence on Cavendish Square, London

Coordinates: 51.5163°N 0.1439°W

Harcourt House was a palatial residence built in about 1722 by Thomas Archer on Cavendish Square. The main structure was largely demolished in 1906 leaving only the southern wing on the corner with Margaret Street, now Flanders House. The southern wing of the building survives today as 1A Cavendish Square.

The palladian residence Archer designed was the centre-piece of the east side of Cavendish Square, London for nearly two centuries. Archer's building was built for Robert Benson, 1st Baron Bingley, but was renamed to Harcourt House after it was bought by Simon Harcourt, 1st Viscount Harcourt. The house was significantly altered by his grandson Simon Harcourt, 1st Earl Harcourt. It was later the residence of William Cavendish-Scott-Bentinck, 5th Duke of Portland, Lord of the Manor of Marylebone, and John Campbell, 2nd Marquess of Breadalbane.

The house was empty till 1906 when the centre and north of the house was demolished to make way for a development of luxury flats, also called Harcourt House. LaSalle Investment Management sold that building, occupying two thirds of the original site, to the Sunley Group in 2013.

A 3D reconstruction of the original building was made by Survey of London in 2015.
