= John Walpole =

British soldier and politician (1787–1859)

The Honourable Colonel John Walpole
- Born: 17 November 1787
- Died: 10 December 1859 (aged 72)
- Burial place: Kensal Green Cemetery
- Military career
- Allegiance: United Kingdom
- Branch: British Army
- Service years: 1804–1825
- Rank: Colonel
- Unit: Coldstream Guards
- Conflicts: Napoleonic Wars; Siege of Cádiz; Battle of Barrosa; Siege of Ciudad Rodrigo; Battle of Salamanca; Siege of Burgos (WIA); Hundred Days

Colonel John Walpole (17 November 1787 – 10 December 1859) was a soldier and diplomat, a younger son of Horatio Walpole, 2nd Earl of Orford.

He served with the Guards during the Peninsular War, and was wounded at the Siege of Burgos. He was Member of Parliament for King's Lynn from 1822 to 1831. Walpole served as private secretary to Lord Palmerston from November 1830 to August 1833, when he was appointed British Consul-General and Plenipotentiary at Santiago in Chile. Walpole was promoted to Chargé d'affaires in May 1841, and retired in March 1849.

Parliament of Great Britain
Preceded by Lord Walpole; Marquess of Titchfield	Member of Parliament for King's Lynn; 1822–1831; With: Marquess of Titchfield 1822–1824; Marquess of Titchfield 1824–1826; Lord William Bentinck 1826–1828; Lord George Bentinck 1828–1831	Succeeded by Lord William Lennox; Lord George Bentinck
Diplomatic posts
Preceded by Digby Wrangham	Principal Private Secretary to the Secretary of State for Foreign Affairs; 1830–1833	Succeeded by Stephen Henry Sulivan
Preceded by John White	British Consul-General and Plenipotentiary at Santiago; 1833–1841	Promotion
New title	British Chargés d'Affaires in Chile; 1841–1849	Succeeded by Stephen Henry Sulivan
