= Henrietta Bentinck, Duchess of Portland =

British noble (1774-1844)

Henrietta Bentinck, Duchess of Portland (née Scott; 1774 – 24 April 1844) was the wife of William Bentinck, 4th Duke of Portland.

Henrietta was born in Edinburgh, Scotland, and was the eldest daughter and the heiress of Major-General John Scott of Fife and his second wife, the former Margaret Dundas. Prior to her marriage, she was sometimes referred to as "the rich Miss Scott", to differentiate her from her two younger sisters. Her sisters were Lucy, wife of Francis Stuart, 10th Earl of Moray, and Joan, suo jure Viscountess Canning, wife of George Canning, Prime Minister of the United Kingdom.

Henrietta married the future duke in London on 4 August 1795, when he was styled Marquess of Titchfield. The marquess obtained Royal Licence to take the name and arms of Scott in addition to that of Cavendish-Bentinck. They had nine children:

- William Henry, Marquess of Titchfield (22 October 1796 – 5 March 1824)
- Lady Margaret Harriet Cavendish-Scott-Bentinck (1798-1882), who died unmarried
- Lady Caroline Cavendish-Scott-Bentinck (1799-1828)
- William Cavendish-Scott-Bentinck, 5th Duke of Portland (1800-1879)
- Lord George Frederick Cavendish-Scott-Bentinck (1802-1848), who died unmarried
- Lord Henry William Cavendish-Scott-Bentinck (1804-1870), who died unmarried
- Lady Charlotte Cavendish-Scott-Bentinck (1806-1889), who married John Evelyn Denison, 1st Viscount Ossington
- Lady Lucy Joan Cavendish-Scott-Bentinck (1807-1899), who married Charles Ellis, 6th Baron Howard de Walden, and had children
- Lady Mary Cavendish-Scott-Bentinck (1809-1874), who married Lt.-Col. Sir William Topham

The marquess inherited his father's dukedom in 1809, and Henrietta became Duchess of Portland. Their family home was Welbeck Abbey, Nottinghamshire, where the duke kept racehorses and carried out extensive irrigation works.

Two of the couple's sons predeceased their parents: the Marquess of Titchfield died of a brain lesion, aged 27, and Lord George Bentinck of a heart attack. The duchess predeceased her husband, who died at Welbeck Abbey in March 1854, aged 85.
