= Statue of Lord George Bentinck =

Statue in London, England

Coordinates: 51.5162°N 0.1449°W

Lord George Bentinck
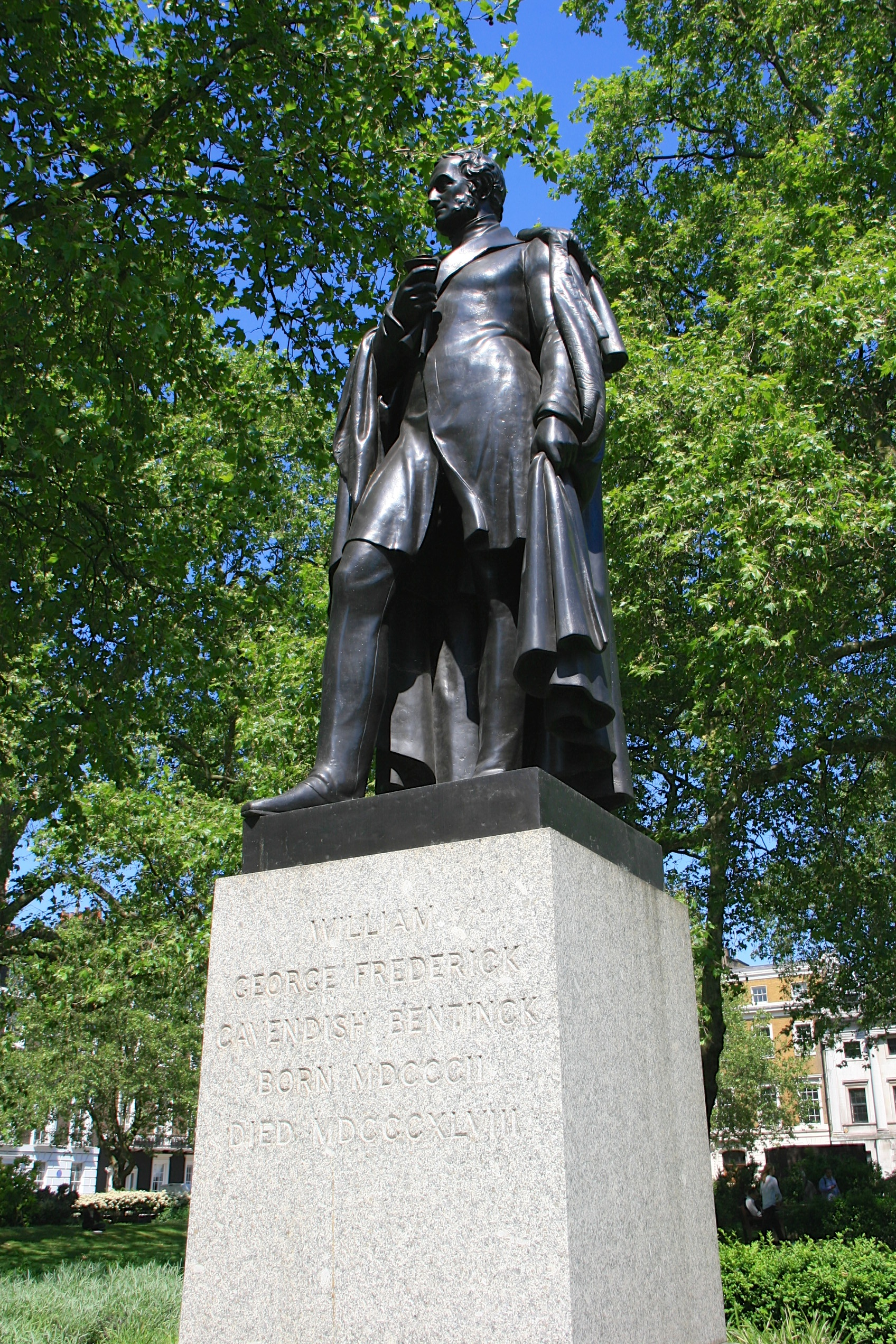
- Artist: Thomas Campbell
- Completion date: 1851
- Subject: Lord George Bentinck
- Location: London

Listed Building – Grade II
- Official name: Statue of Lord George Bentinck (At South End of Square Garden)
- Designated: 1 December 1987
- Reference no.: 1066308

The statue of Lord George Bentinck is a Grade II listed statue at the southern end of Cavendish Square in Marylebone, London.

Lord George Bentinck was a prominent politician but was also known for his interest in horse-racing and hunting. It is said that he would attend Parliament wearing his hunting coat. Bentinck fought strongly for protectionist policies against Robert Peel as a supporter of the Corn Laws. At his death all ships within the Port of London flew their flags at half mast.

The statue is designed by Thomas Campbell and was unveiled in 1851. It shows Bentinck wearing a frock coat and cloak.
