= Mick Jackson (author) =

British writer from England (born 1960)

Mick Jackson (born 1960) is a British writer from England, best known for his novel The Underground Man (1997). The book, based on the life of William Cavendish-Scott-Bentinck, 5th Duke of Portland, was shortlisted for the Man Booker Prize and for the 1997 Whitbread Award for best first novel.

== Overview ==
Mick Jackson was born in 1960, in Great Harwood, Lancashire, and educated at Queen Elizabeth's Grammar School, Blackburn.

Jackson worked in local theatre, studied theatre arts at Dartington College of Arts, and played in a rock band called The Screaming Abdabs and an urban folk band, The Dinner Ladies. In 1990, he enrolled in a creative writing course at the University of East Anglia, and began working on The Underground Man. He has been a full-time writer since 1995.

He is best known for his novel The Underground Man (1997), based on the life of William Cavendish-Scott-Bentinck, 5th Duke of Portland. The book was shortlisted for the Man Booker Prize, and for the 1997 Whitbread Award for best first novel.

Jackson's other works are the novels Five Boys (2002) The Widow's Tale (2010) and Yuki Chan in Bronte Country (2016), and the short story collections Ten Sorry Tales (2006) and The Bears of England (2009). He has also written several books for children; While You're Sleeping, We're Going Places, Ava Jay Does It Her Way and The Red Sledge. Under the pseudonym Kirkham Jackson, he wrote the screenplay for the 2004 television film Roman Road. He lives in Brighton.
