= Lord George Bentinck =

British politician

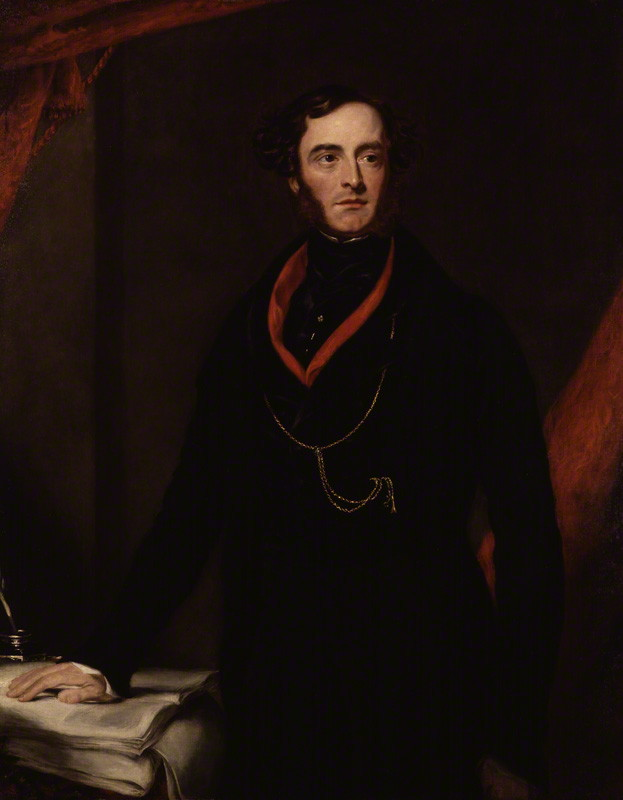
- Portrait by Samuel Lane, 1836

Member of Parliament for King's Lynn
- In office 1828–1848
- Preceded by: William Henry Cavendish-Bentinck; John Walpole
- Succeeded by: Edward Stanley; Viscount Jocelyn

Personal details
- Born: 27 February 1802 Welbeck Abbey, Nottinghamshire
- Died: 21 September 1848 (aged 46) The Dukeries, Nottinghamshire
- Party: Whig
- Other political affiliations: Conservative
- Parents: William Bentinck (father); Henrietta Scott (mother)

Lord William George Frederick Cavendish-Scott-Bentinck (27 February 1802 – 21 September 1848), better known as Lord George Bentinck, was an English Conservative politician and racehorse owner noted for his role (with Benjamin Disraeli) in unseating Sir Robert Peel over the Corn Laws.

== Family ==
Bentinck was born into the prominent Bentinck family, the fifth child and third son of William Bentinck, 4th Duke of Portland and Henrietta (née Scott). His mother was the daughter, and along with her two sisters, the heiress, of the rich General John Scott of Fife.

Bentinck was known by the name George, as all the men in his family were given the first name William. He was educated privately and grew up on his father's Welbeck Abbey estate in Nottinghamshire and at Fullarton House, near Troon, Ayrshire, where his father developed the docks.

== Early career ==
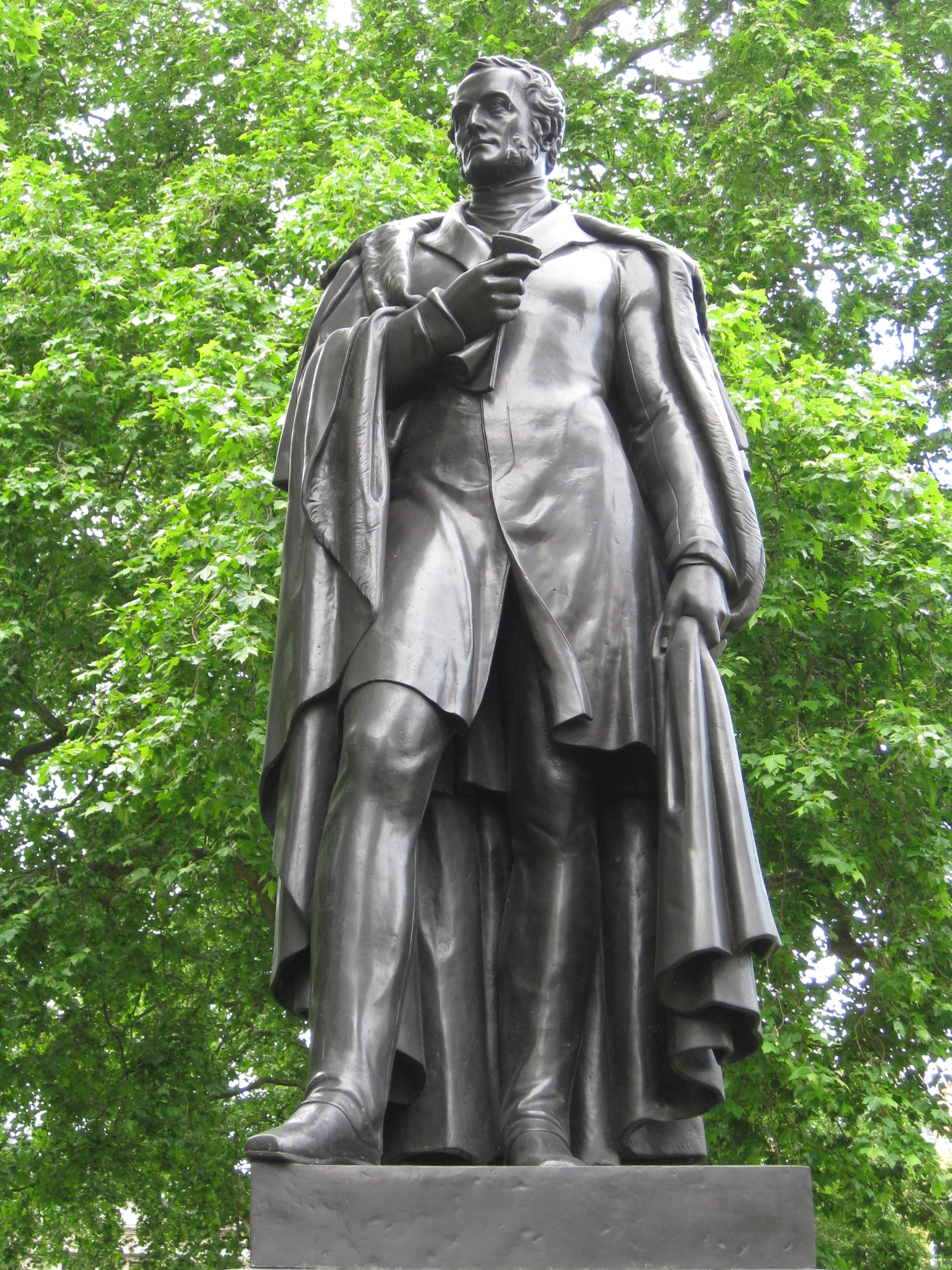
Statue in Cavendish Square, London

In 1818, Bentinck and his older brother John joined the army, but personal conflicts derailed his military career. As an officer in the 9th Lancers, he called his superior officer, Captain John Ker, a "poltroon", in February 1821. Ker levelled charges against Bentinck of "inattention to duty and contemptuous, insubordinate and disrespectful behaviour." Bentinck requested an inquiry into the charges and was ultimately cleared. However, the incident would not die and in May 1821 in Paris, Bentinck and Ker were prepared to duel. Bentinck's uncle George Canning interceded and stopped the event.

Bentinck returned to England and exchanged regiments with the plan of going to India. In May 1822, he was assigned as aide-de-camp to Canning, who had accepted the position of Governor-General of India. Instead, Canning became foreign secretary after the Marquess of Londonderry committed suicide. Canning requested both George and John be his non-stipendiary private secretaries "to wean them from their too great zeal in the chase and too great idleness in every other respect." John declined, joining the Life Guard Regiment, but George accepted the position.

In 1824, the death of their eldest brother, Henry, the Marquess of Titchfield, caused another change of plans. John became the Marquess of Titchfield and George took his place in the Life Guards, "it being the duke of Portland's wish that he should now take to the army as his profession."

Once again conflicts arose; in July 1825, Bentinck engaged a junior officer in a bloodless duel over an incident related to the mess accounts. Bentinck then left the regiment and took half-pay with the rank of major.

In 1828, he ran unopposed as the Whig representative for King's Lynn before moving over to join the Conservative Party (via the Derby Dilly parliamentary faction) by about 1835–6. Bentinck held King's Lynn until his death.

== Horse racing ==
Before his interest in active politics in the 1840s, Bentinck was far better known for his interest in "the Turf." He was a notorious gambler, often losing substantial amounts. Bentinck owned several successful racehorses and his stable, which he established at Goodwood, was renowned for its quality. During the 1845 season, it was estimated that he had won more than £100,000.

Bentinck made strenuous efforts to eliminate fraud in the sport (although his own behaviour in fixing odds was not always scrupulous). In 1844, having exposed the winner of the Derby as a fraud, he proposed a set of rules to cover horse racing. By a series of legal actions he also limited the corruption involved in making and settlement of bets, deriving from outdated legislation. He is also credited with inventing the flag start at a race meeting at Goodwood. Prior to that races had been started by the starter shouting. Although something of a "self-appointed vigilante", he is now seen as a great innovator and reformer of the sport.

Though he was an "aristocratic dandy" who wore a new silk scarf every day, Bentinck's volatile temper again got him in trouble. He nearly lost his life in a duel over an unpaid debt. He fired his pistol in the air as his opponent, Squire Osbaldeston, an expert marksman, was flustered and missed, shooting Bentinck cleanly through the hat.

Despite his success in horse racing, his father reportedly strongly disapproved of this activity, and the duke was delighted when his son returned to "the more elevated occupations of political society." To commit himself to his political career, in 1846, Bentinck sold his entire stables and racing team for the bargain price of £10,000.

== Leader of the Protectionists ==
Bentinck first became prominent in politics in 1846 when he, with Disraeli, led the protectionist opposition to the repeal of the Corn Laws. Until he rose to speak against their repeal, he had not spoken a word in 18 years in Parliament. Historians see Bentinck's participation as vital, for the majority of those who opposed repeal were country gentlemen, who were far more likely to follow the son of a Duke than Disraeli, an Anglicized Sephardic-Jewish literary figure, then of dubious repute. The Bentinck-Disraeli relationship culminated in Bentinck offering to provide a £25,000 loan for Disraeli's purchase of Hughenden Manor in 1848.

Although Bentinck and Disraeli did not prevent the repeal of the Corn Laws, they did succeed in forcing Peel's resignation some weeks later over the Irish Coercion Bill. The Conservative Party broke in half; some hundred free-trade Peelites followed Peel, while 230 protectionists formed the new Conservative Party, with Stanley (later the Earl of Derby) as overall leader. Bentinck became leader of the party in the House of Commons. He unsuccessfully led calls upon the government of Lord John Russell to alleviate suffering in Ireland arising from the Great Famine of Ireland by investing in a substantial railway construction programme.

Bentinck resigned the leadership in 1848, his support of Jewish emancipation being unpopular with the bulk of the party, and was succeeded by the Marquess of Granby.

== India ==
Lord George Bentinck alongside Thomas Macaulay downgraded John Stuart Mill's proposal that Indian philosophy and language should be a part of the education for India at that time, preferring the exaltation of English literature, thought and science.

== Death and legacy ==
On 21 September 1848, Bentinck left his father's home at Welbeck Abbey at 3 pm, intending to walk 6 miles (9.7 km) through "The Dukeries" to Thoresby Hall to dine with Charles Pierrepont, 2nd Earl Manvers. A search party was sent to look for him when he did not arrive at Thoresby, and his body was ultimately found at 9 p.m. He was aged 46.

Initial reports stated it appeared he died of "apoplexy," but it is believed he died of a heart attack. Although there were rumours of suicide (or even murder), his autopsy clearly showed emphysema and congestion of the lungs. Bentinck, who was unmarried (there were rumours that he and his brother Lord Henry were, in the phraseology of the time, "woman haters"), was buried in the Duke of Portland vault at Marylebone Old Church in London.

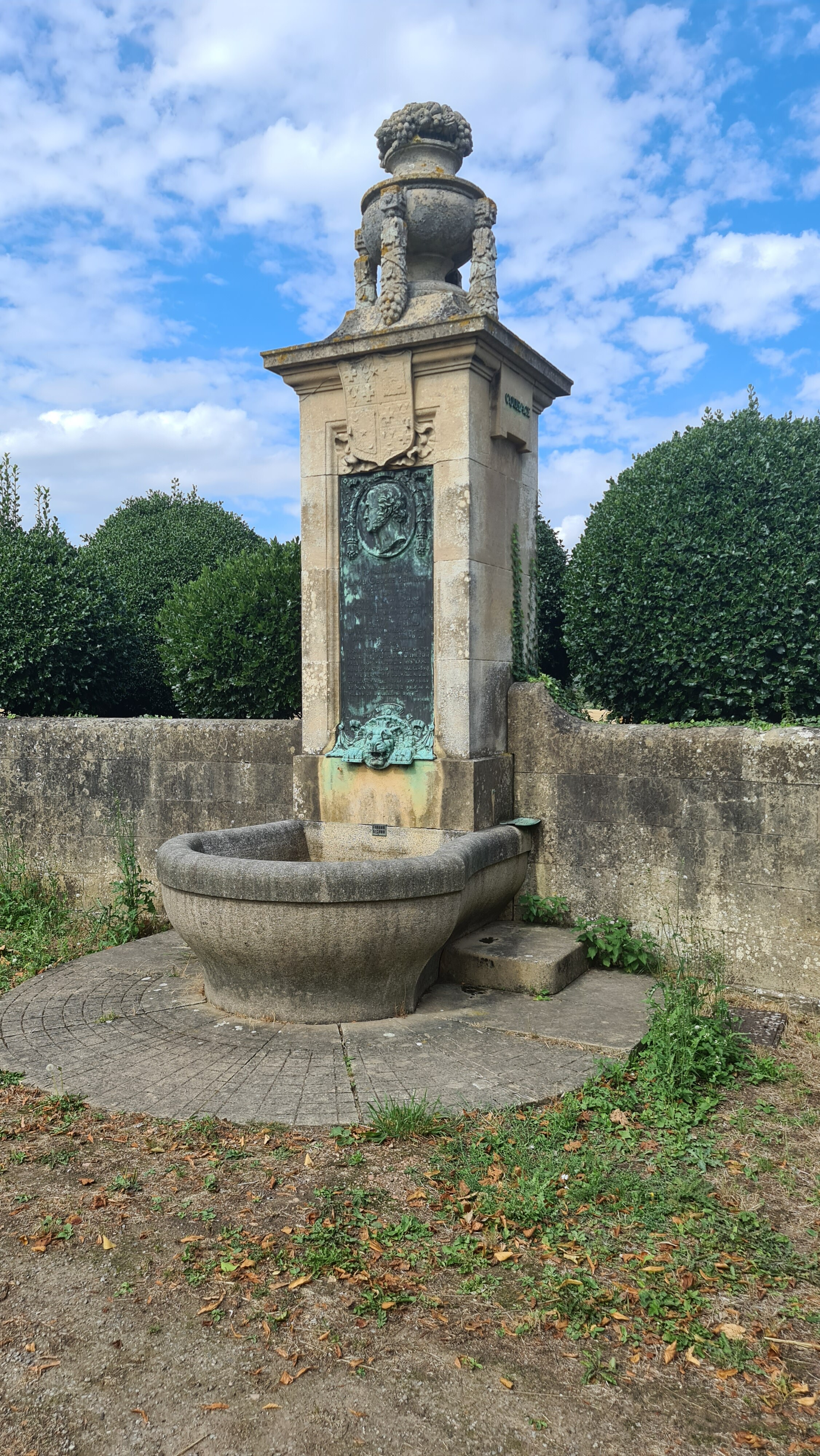
Lord George Bentinck Memorial, Welbeck Abbey

He is commemorated with a statue in London's Cavendish Square Gardens, a memorial close to the spot where he died near Worksop, and a large gothic memorial by Thomas Chambers Hine erected in Mansfield.

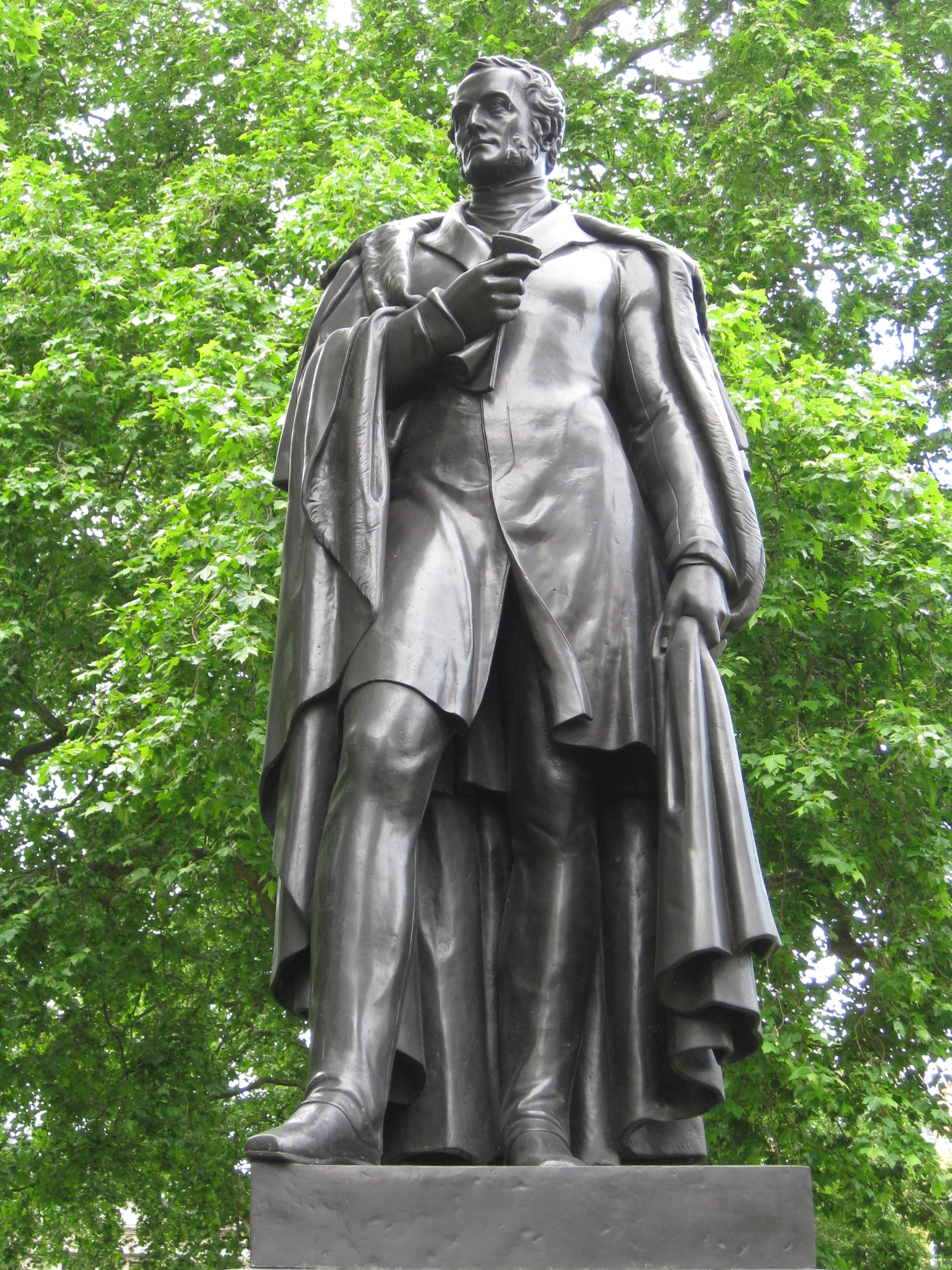
George Bentinck-Cavendish Statue, Cavendish Square

Charles Greville (who had once been a partner of Bentinck in a horse-racing syndicate) wrote of him after his death: "He brought into politics the same ardour, activity, industry and cleverness which he had displayed on the turf . . . having once espoused a cause and espoused a party, from whatever motive, he worked with all the force of his intellect and a superhuman power of application in what he perceived to be the interest of that party and that cause . . . [However] I have not the least doubt that, for his own reputation and celebrity, he died at the most opportune period; his fame had probably reached its zenith, and credit was given him for greater abilities than he possessed."

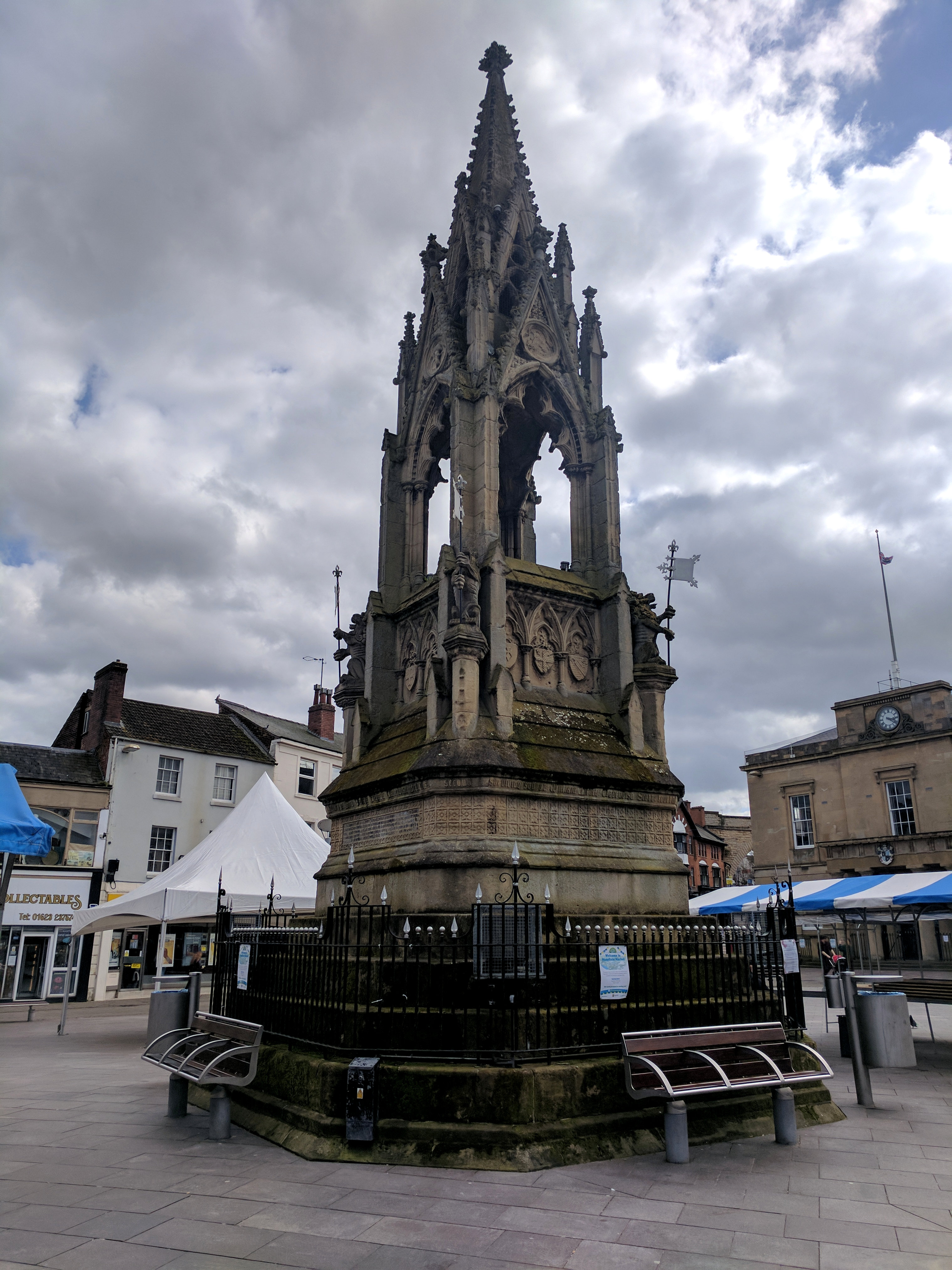
The Cavendish Monument, Mansfield, Nottinghamshire

The Department of Manuscripts and Special Collections at the University of Nottingham holds the correspondence and personal papers of Lord George Bentinck, as part of the Portland (Welbeck) Collection.

Diplomatic posts
Preceded by George Seymour	Principal Private Secretary to the Secretary of State for Foreign Affairs; 1822–1824	Succeeded by Augustus Stapleton
Parliament of the United Kingdom
Preceded by Lord William Bentinck; John Walpole	Member of Parliament for King's Lynn; 1828–1848; With: John Walpole to 1831; Lord William Lennox 1831–1835; Sir Stratford Canning 1835–1842; Viscount Jocelyn 1842–1854	Succeeded by Edward Stanley; Viscount Jocelyn
Party political offices
Preceded by Sir Robert Peel, Bt	Conservative Leader of the Commons; 1846–1847	Succeeded by Marquess of Granby
