= Cavendish Square =

Public square in the West End of London

Coordinates: 51.5165°N 0.1450°W

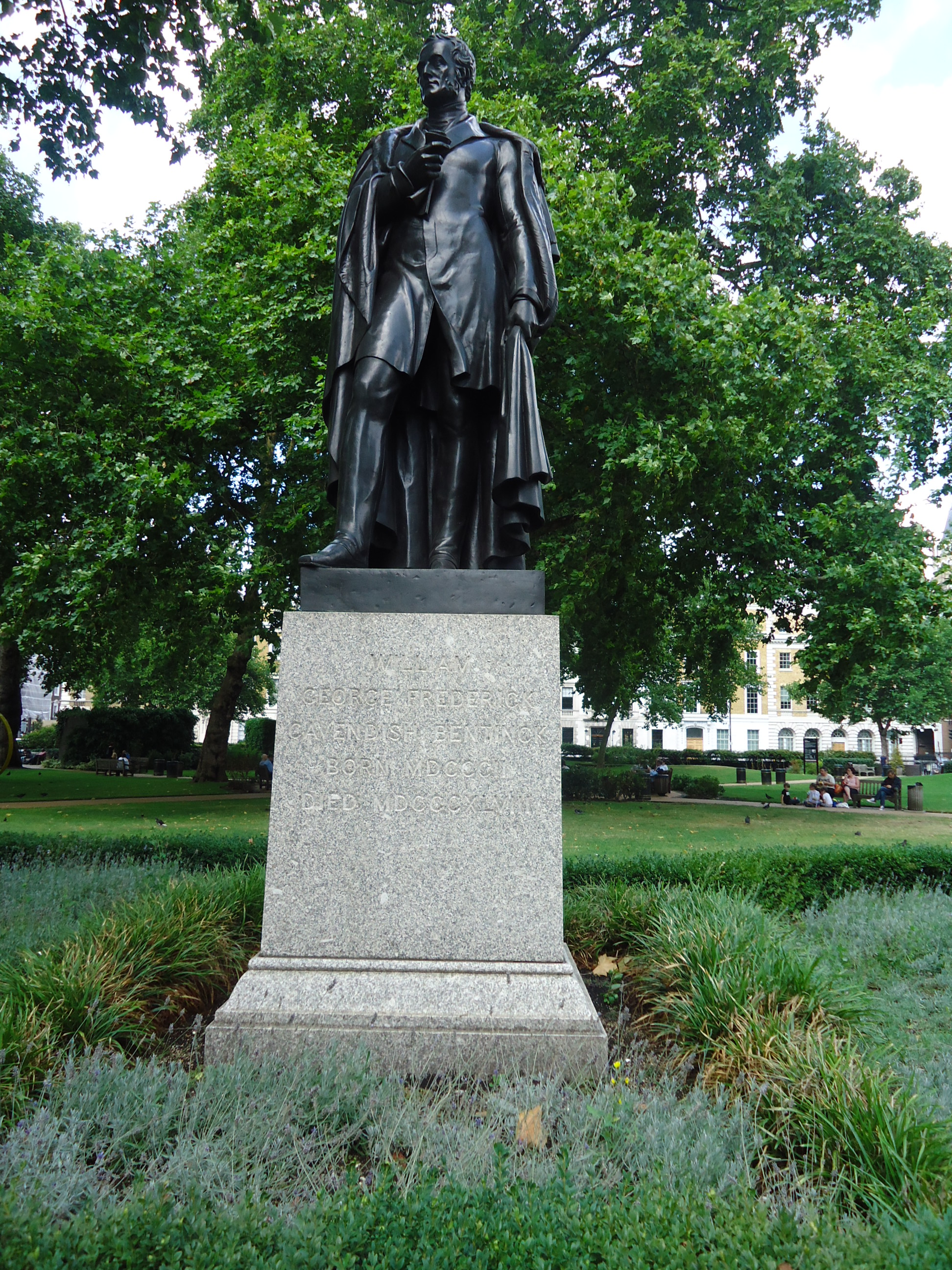
Cavendish Square

Cavendish Square is a public garden square in Marylebone in the West End of London. It has a double-helix underground commercial car park. Its northern road forms the ends of four streets: Wigmore Street, which runs to Portman Square in the much larger Portman Estate to the west; Harley Street, which runs a similar distance; Chandos Street, which runs for one block; and Cavendish Place, which runs the same. The south side of the square is modern, including the rear façade and accesses to a flagship department store and an office block. On the ground floors facing are Comptoir Libanais, Royal Bank of Scotland and Pret a Manger premises.

Oxford Circus 150m south-east is where two main shopping streets meet. Only the south is broken by a full-width street, Holles Street. which also runs one block only; the north is broken by Dean's Mews in which Nos. 11–13 exist, the office conversion of a nunnery, retaining a chapel in its rear.

Planning permission was granted in April 2020 for a subterranean health and wellbeing development of 280,000 square feet across four storeys below ground level.

== History ==
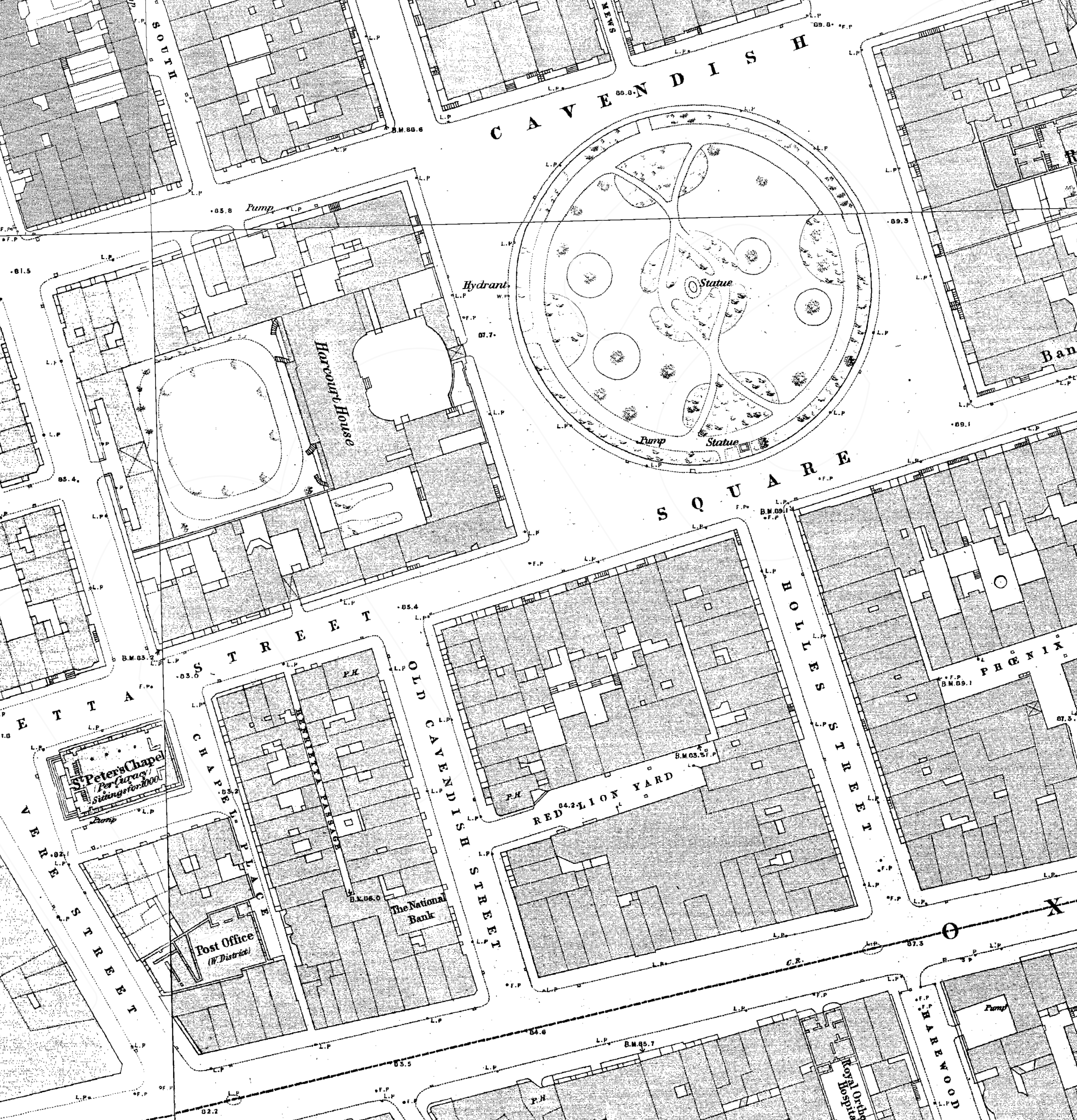
Plan of Cavendish Square in the 1870s

It was first laid out for the 2nd Earl of Oxford by architect John Prince, beginning in 1717 as the first development on the Earl's London estate. It was named after the Earl's wife Henrietta Cavendish-Holles, but the South Sea Bubble delayed further work. It included nobles' London rentals and longer leases including James Brydges, 1st Duke of Chandos (whose house was never completed), Princess Amelia (in which house she died), and the Lane Baronets. The heir to the main landowner, Duke of Portland lived his London life here. It measures 124–128 m (408–420 ft) across.

A map showing the Cavendish ward of St Marylebone Metropolitan Borough as it appeared in 1916.

A blue plaque from 1951 commemorates H. H. Asquith, Prime Minister of the United Kingdom from 1908 to 1916, who had lived at No. 20. Another is to Quintin Hogg, founder of what is now the University of Westminster, the flagship building of the university backs on to his former family home. The square hosts the Royal College of Nursing headquarters and Harcourt House, London. Near to Harley Street, some of the grand townhouses accommodate medical practices such as those of James Paget. Artist Robert William Sievier lived on the square, and David Williams, founder of the Royal Literary Fund, ran a chapel. Frances Fanshawe, wife of Rev. Dr. Abraham Blackborne, grandson of Richard Levett, Lord Mayor of London, died at her home on Margaret Street, an approach way, in 1795 and was buried at Kew.

The square features in Robert Louis Stevenson's novel Dr Jekyll and Mr Hyde as the home of Dr Lanyon, Jekyll's former best friend.

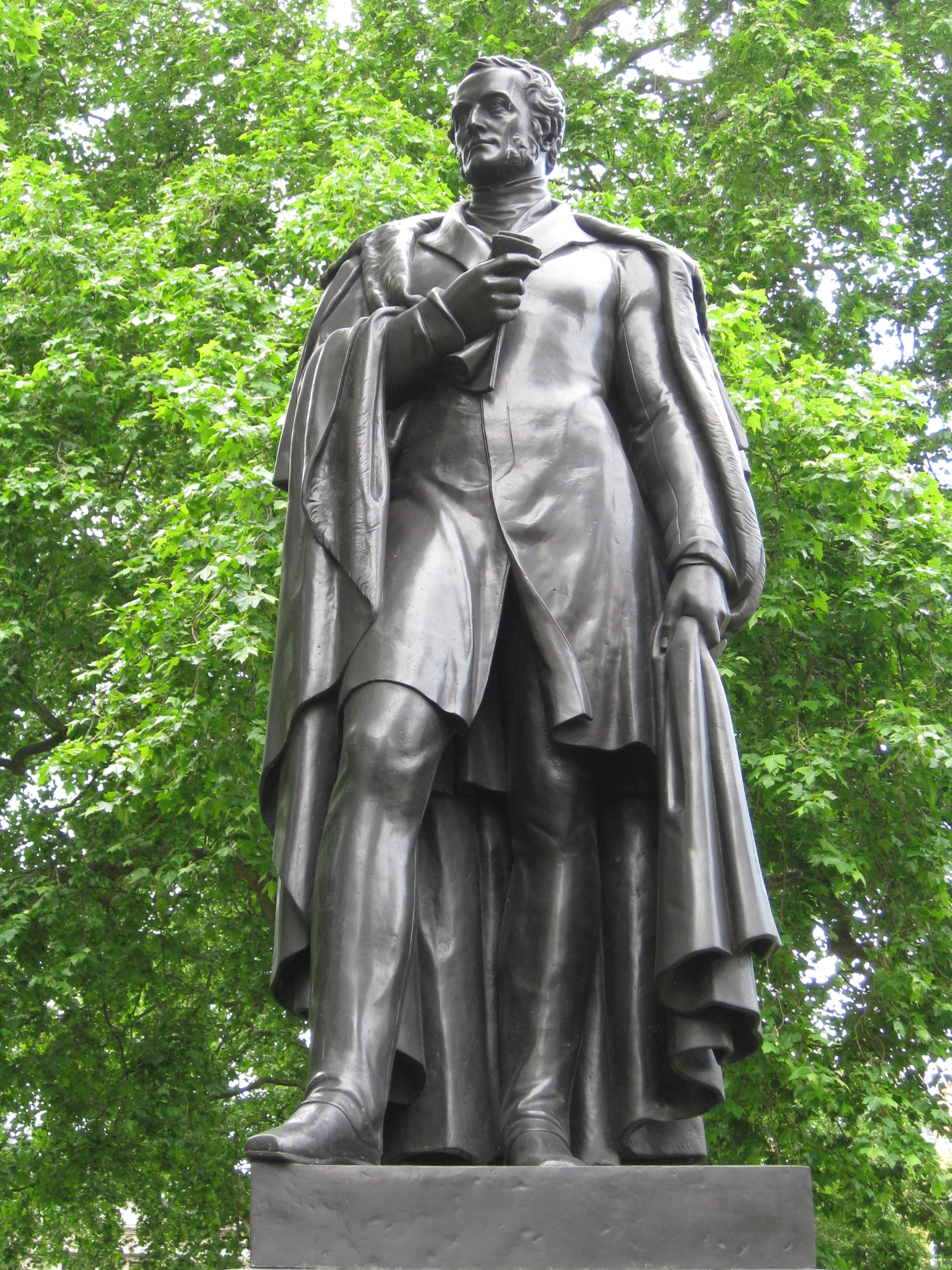
Statue of Lord George Bentinck on the south side by Thomas Campbell.

There is a bronze statue of Lord George Bentinck on the south side of the square. Bentinck (1802–1848) was MP for King's Lynn, Norfolk. The statue is by Thomas Campbell and was erected in 1851. A statue of Prince William, Duke of Cumberland was erected in 1770, following his defeat of Charles Edward Stuart at Culloden in 1746, but was removed in the 1860s after public opinion of him had changed. The plinth remained empty until 2012, when it housed a temporary artwork Written in Soap, A Plinth Project; a similar sculpture but made in soap gradually eroded until it was removed in 2016.

The square was targeted on 17 December 1992 by the Provisional Irish Republican Army, 15 minutes after another small bomb at John Lewis. Four people were injured in total.

== Parking ==
Underground is vehicle parking for 521 cars and 83 motorcycles. Operated by Q-Park, it is promoted for Oxford Street. It unusually has the form of a double helix (a twin-start screw). Vehicles are parked on either side of a continuously descending right-hand helix with one-way traffic. At the bottom, cars are directed diametrically across, to find a left-hand one way ascending helix, with parking on either side sandwiched between the turns of the descending helix. Parking near the beginning or end makes for the shortest walk. But having hoped for the latter and finding them full will result in the need for a second pass. Oxford Circus (corner-to-corner 150 m south-east), a slightly longer journey by any southern approach along John Prince's Street, is where two main shopping streets meet.

By 2022 a pedestrian lift had been installed, which rises to an exit on the south side of Cavendish Square. The excavated location under most of the middle of Cavendish Square was originally dug as an access shaft for construction of the Victoria Line Underground in the mid-1960s, with a further horizontal access tunnel towards Oxford Circus station. The excavation was adapted for the car park after completion of this.

== Listed structures ==
=== Buildings ===
Anticlockwise from south-east corner; note traffic goes clockwise. Grade II:

East side

- No. 1 (no frontage to square) and 1A (Flanders House) representative office of Flanders
- No. 4
- Nos. 12 and 14 Cavendish Place (both with oblique views of the square, only listed buildings of their short street)

North side

- No. 15
- No. 16

West side

- Nos. 19 and 19A (Harcourt House) a pair of joined mirror-image mansion flats in Edwardian Baroque style, completed in 1909, designed by the firm of Gilbert and Costanduros with "an impressive Portland stone frontage in Edwardian Baroque style". The flats are decorative externally with stone octagonal domed roof pavilions and classical features including carved pediments, Ionic columns and pilasters and cast iron lamp standards; some ingenuity exists in variation of ceiling heights of the flats; one apartment has 1943-painted wall murals in Classical style by war artist Rupert Shephard;
- No. 20 (Royal College of Nursing)
- Nos. 1, 3 and 5 Harley Street – see Harley Street (with oblique view of the square)
- No. 17

At Grade II*:

East side

- No. 3
- No. 5 of about 1740 with next two centuries alterations
- No. 7. Converted to offices. Built 1910–12 by James Gibson for Arthur Ridley Bax.

West side

- No. 18

=== Epstein statue and bridge ===
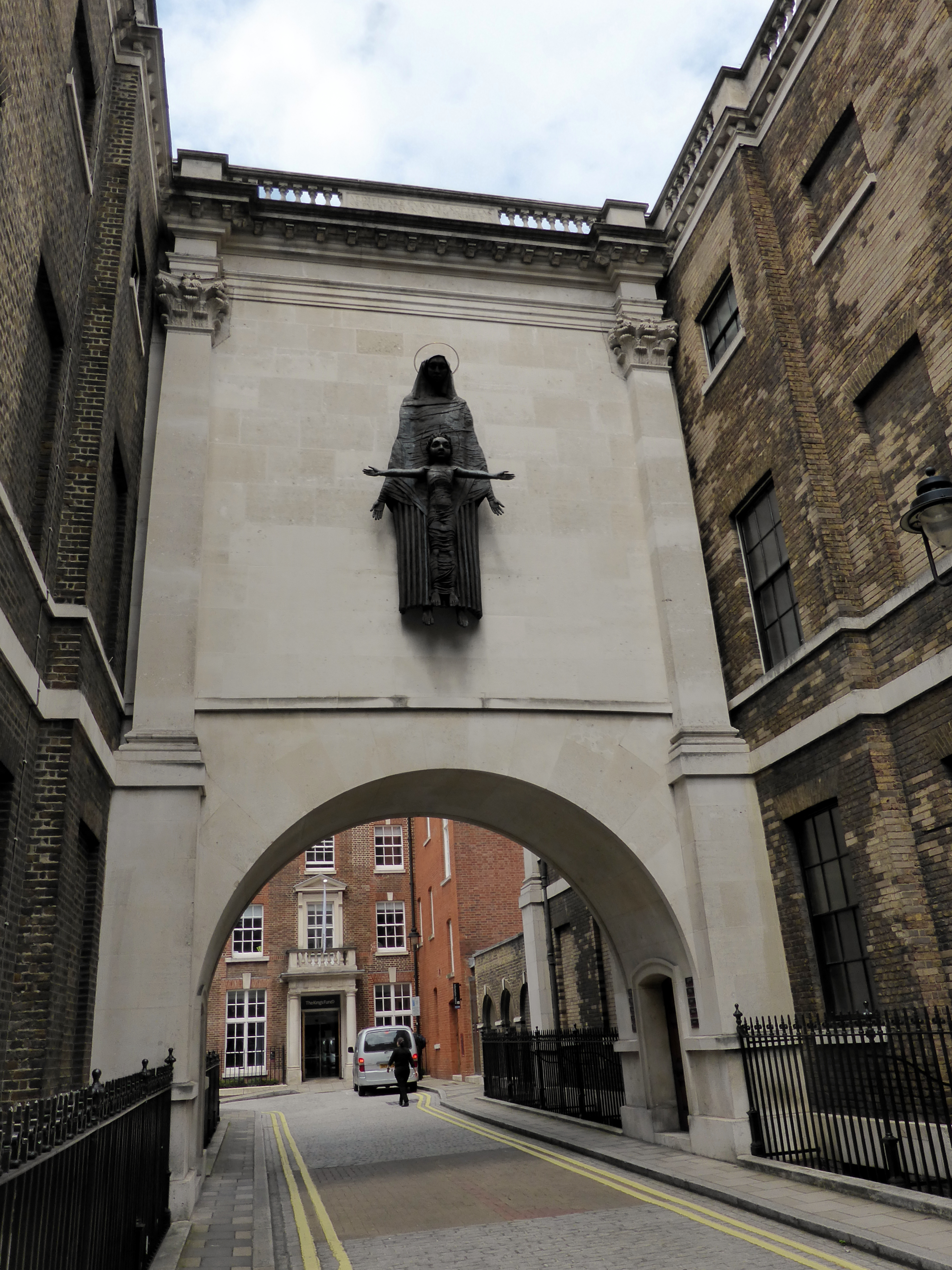
Epstein's Madonna and Child

In the 19th century, No.s 11, 12 and 13 on the middle of the northern range had become a convent with an interconnecting tunnel, under Dean's Mews. After damage in the London Blitz the nuns commissioned architect Louis Osman to restore the building and create a bridge between the two. He approached Jacob Epstein for a Virgin and Child that would "levitate" above the arch and specified that it should be cast in lead which was plentiful from the bombed roofs. However, Osman did not inform the mother superior that the sculptor was Jewish, which may have been an objection among some Catholics at the time. The Arts Council congratulated her on her "innovative choice of artist" and Epstein's work was unveiled in 1953. The structure and artwork work is Grade II* listed.

== Notable occupants ==
- No. 1a (Flanders House) – the Representative Office of Flanders and Visit Flanders office
- No. 4 – the Embassy of East Timor
- No. 5 – As of 27 February 2017 hosts a headquarters of Lifescience Dynamics Ltd
- Nos. 11–13 – Heythrop College, University of London, followed by the King's Fund think tank and award giver.
- No. 20 – the Royal College of Nursing and its library and heritage centre
- No. 37 – the highest number having an oblique view of the square, The Phoenix public house.

== See also ==
- List of eponymous roads in London
