= William Cavendish-Scott-Bentinck, Marquess of Titchfield =

British noble & politician (1796-1824)

Marquess of Titchfield

Member of Parliament for Bletchingley
- In office 27 February 1819 – 9 January 1822
- Preceded by: George Tennyson; Sir William Curtis
- Succeeded by: Lord Francis Leveson-Gower; Edward Henry Edwardes

Member of Parliament for King's Lynn
- In office 9 January 1822 – 5 March 1824
- Preceded by: Sir Martin ffolkes Lord Walpole
- Succeeded by: John Walpole; Marquess of Titchfield

Personal details
- Born: 21 August 1796 Welbeck Abbey, Nottinghamshire
- Died: 5 March 1824 (aged 27) St. James's Square, London
- Parent(s): William Bentinck, 4th Duke of Portland; Henrietta Scott
- Education: Christ Church, Oxford

William Henry Cavendish-Scott-Bentinck, Marquess of Titchfield (21 August 1796 – 5 March 1824)—styled Viscount Woodstock until 1809—was a British Member of Parliament (MP) and son of a duke. Born into the noble Bentinck family, his grandfather William Cavendish-Bentinck, 3rd Duke of Portland, served as both Prime Minister of Great Britain and Prime Minister of the United Kingdom. Expected to succeed his father as the fifth Duke of Portland, Titchfield died at only 27 years old.

== Biography ==
Henry was the first child of William Cavendish-Bentinck, 4th Duke of Portland, and his wife Henrietta (née Scott). His father was the grandson of William Cavendish, 4th Duke of Devonshire, while his mother, Henrietta, was one of three daughters and heiresses born to Scottish General John Scott. Upon their marriage, the family name became Cavendish-Scott-Bentinck.

In honour of the birth of his first grandson, the Third Duke of Portland commissioned the Portland Baptismal Font, the only known gold font commissioned for private use in England. Designed by landscaper Humphrey Repton and crafted by Paul Storr, it stayed in the Bentinck family until 1986, when it was acquired by the British Museum.

Henry – referred to by his second name as all the males in the family were named William – was styled as the Marquess of Titchfield in 1809, when his father succeeded to the dukedom.

After private education at home, Titchfield went to Christ Church, Oxford, in 1815. Under headmaster Edmund Goodenough, Titchfield excelled academically and distinguished himself in classical literature. "Few men entered the 'world's great stage' with brighter prospects before them. His character, thus eminent and unsullied at the place of his education, was afterwards destined to display itself with no less brilliancy in the senate of his country, to which an honourable ambition incited him to display the talents, so useful and conspicuous, with which nature and application had endowed him," praised the Rev. Thomas Maurice after his death.

His Oxford classmate George Agar-Ellis, who later became a close friend, wrote in his diary in 1815 that Titchfield was a "stripling marquess" and a "horrid bore ... an empty talkative coxcomb, with the Devonshire bad, affected manner."

His uncle Charles Greville, however, believed that Titchfield's education at home created a disadvantage he was forced to overcome:

The superior indulgences and early habits of authority and power in which he was brought up, without receiving correction from any of those levelling circumstances which are incidental to public schools, threw a shade of selfishness and reserve over his character, which time, the commerce of the world, and a naturally kind disposition had latterly done much to correct.

— Charles Greville, The Greville Memoirs

Another uncle, the Prime Minister George Canning, later praised his character: "He is really the best of creatures— so right minded and so warmhearted, and so full of native good sense."

In 1819, Titchfield joined the Nottinghamshire Yeomanry Cavalry as a captain. That same year, he was elected to the House of Commons as MP for Bletchingley, and held that seat until 1822. He was then elected for King's Lynn in 1822, a seat he held until his death. He is known to have given only one speech in Parliament, on 14 May 1819, when he criticized the Game Laws. He also voted against public lotteries and for inquiry into the abuse of charitable foundations.

He died at the family home in London in March 1824, at age 27; his early death was attributed to a brain abscess. He was interred in the family vault at Marylebone Parish Church in London.

His younger brothers, the eccentric John and temperamental George, also served as MPs. John succeeded him as both the Marquess of Titchfield and the MP for King's Lynn, and eventually became the fifth Duke of Portland.

== Titles ==
- Viscount Woodstock (1796–1809)
- Marquess of Titchfield (1809–1824)

== See also ==
- Duke of Portland

Parliament of the United Kingdom
Preceded by George Tennyson; Sir William Curtis	Member of Parliament for Bletchingley; 1819–1822; With: Sir William Curtis to 1820; Edward Henry Edwardes from 1820	Succeeded by Lord Francis Leveson-Gower; Edward Henry Edwardes
Preceded by Sir Martin ffolkes Lord Walpole	Member of Parliament for King's Lynn; 1822–1824; With: Lord Walpole 1822; John Walpole 1822–1824	Succeeded by John Walpole; Marquess of Titchfield
