= Edward Henry Edwardes =

English MP (1798-1829)

Member of Parliament for Bletchingley
- In office 6 March 1820 – 19 June 1826

Personal details
- Born: 5 November 1798
- Died: 16 August 1829 (aged 30)
- Education: Eton College
- Alma mater: Christ Church, Oxford; St John's College, Cambridge

Edward Henry Edwardes (5 November 1798 – 16 August 1829) was an English politician. He served as a Member of Parliament (MP) for Bletchingley.

== See also ==
- List of MPs elected in the 1820 United Kingdom general election
