= William Bentinck, 4th Duke of Portland =

British politician (1768–1854)

His Grace The Duke of Portland PC
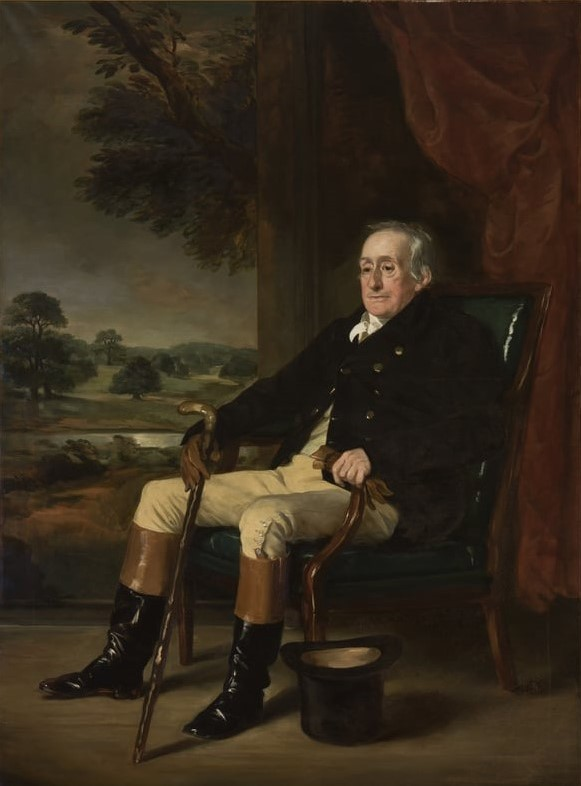
- Portrait of the Duke of Portland by Francis Grant, c. 1852

Lord Privy Seal
- In office 30 April 1827 – July 1827
- Monarch: George IV
- Prime Minister: George Canning
- Preceded by: The Earl of Westmorland
- Succeeded by: The Earl of Carlisle

Lord President of the Council
- In office 17 August 1827 – 21 January 1828
- Monarch: George IV
- Prime Minister: The Viscount Goderich
- Preceded by: The Earl of Harrowby
- Succeeded by: The Earl Bathurst

Member of Parliament for Petersfield
- In office 29 December 1790 – 18 April 1791
- Preceded by: Hon. George North; William Jolliffe
- Succeeded by: Welbore Ellis; William Jolliffe

Member of Parliament for Buckinghamshire
- In office 18 April 1791 – 30 October 1809
- Preceded by: The Earl Verney; James Grenville
- Succeeded by: Earl Temple; William Selby Lowndes

Personal details
- Born: William Henry Cavendish-Bentinck; 24 June 1768 London, England
- Died: 27 March 1854 (aged 85) Welbeck Abbey, Nottinghamshire, England
- Party: Conservative
- Spouse: Henrietta Scott (m. 1795; died 1844)
- Children: 9, including William, John, George, and Henry
- Parent(s): William Cavendish-Bentinck, 3rd Duke of Portland; Lady Dorothy Cavendish

William Henry Cavendish-Scott-Bentinck, 4th Duke of Portland, PC (24 June 1768 – 27 March 1854), styled Marquess of Titchfield until 1809, was a British politician who served in various positions in the governments of George Canning and Lord Goderich.

== Background and education ==
Portland was the eldest son of Prime Minister William Cavendish-Bentinck, 3rd Duke of Portland and Lady Dorothy, daughter of William Cavendish, 4th Duke of Devonshire and Charlotte Boyle, Baroness Clifford. He was the elder brother of Lord William Bentinck and Lord Charles Bentinck.

He was educated first in Ealing under the tutelage of Samuel Goodenough graduating in 1774, followed by Westminster School (1783). He attended Christ Church, Oxford for two years but did not take a degree. The third Duke, who spared no expense for his heir, sent him to The Hague in 1786 for experience working with the crown's envoy, Sir James Harris. He returned in 1789.

He later received an honorary degree of Doctor of Civil Law from Oxford in 1793. He also served as a Family Trustee of the British Museum; in 1810, he loaned the famed Portland Vase to the museum.

== Political career ==
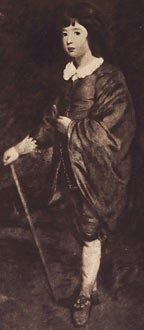
William Henry Cavendish-Scott-Bentinck, 4th Duke of Portland, as a child

Portland was Member of Parliament for Petersfield between 1790 and 1791 and for Buckinghamshire between 1791 and 1809.

He served under his father as a Lord of the Treasury between March and September 1807. He remained out of office until April 1827 when he was appointed Lord Privy Seal by his brother-in-law George Canning. He was sworn of the Privy Council the same year. When Lord Goderich became Prime Minister in August 1827, Portland became Lord President of the Council, an office he retained until the government fell in January 1828. Over time the Duke became less of a staunch Conservative, softening to some of the more liberal stances of Canning.

Portland also held the honorary post of Lord Lieutenant of Middlesex between 1794 and 1841.

== Family ==
Portland married Henrietta, eldest daughter and heiress of Major-General John Scott of Fife and his wife Margaret (née Dundas), in London on 4 August 1795. At the time of his marriage he obtained Royal Licence to take the name and arms of Scott in addition to that of Cavendish-Bentinck. They were parents of nine children:

- William Henry Cavendish-Scott-Bentinck, Marquess of Titchfield (22 October 1796 – 5 March 1824)
- Lady Margaret Harriet Cavendish-Scott-Bentinck (21 April 1798 – 9 April 1882)
- Lady Caroline Cavendish-Scott-Bentinck (6 July 1799 – 23 January 1828)
- William John Cavendish-Scott-Bentinck, 5th Duke of Portland (12 September 1800 – 6 December 1879)
- Lord William George Frederick Cavendish-Scott-Bentinck (27 February 1802 – 21 September 1848)
- Lord Henry William Cavendish-Scott-Bentinck (9 June 1804 – 31 December 1870)
- Lady Charlotte Cavendish-Scott-Bentinck (14 Jan 1806 – 30 September 1889), married Evelyn Denison, 1st Viscount Ossington
- Lady Lucy Joan Cavendish-Scott-Bentinck (27 August 1807 – 29 July 1899), married Charles Ellis, 6th Baron Howard de Walden
- Lady Mary Cavendish-Scott-Bentinck (8 July 1809 – 20 July 1874), married Sir William Topham

== Death and legacy ==
The Duchess of Portland died on 24 April 1844. Nearly 10 years later, Portland died at the family seat of Welbeck Abbey, Nottinghamshire, in March 1854, aged 85. Two of their sons predeceased their parents; their eldest dying of a brain lesion and their third son dying of a heart attack.

The duke expressed a desire to be buried in the open churchyard in Bolsover, Derbyshire, near the other family seat at Bolsover Castle. However, he was instead interred in the ancient Cavendish vault, that had previously been unopened for 138 years.

He was succeeded in the dukedom by his second son (but the eldest surviving), William.

The department of Manuscripts and Special Collections, The University of Nottingham holds a number of papers relating to Portland: His personal and political papers are part of the Portland (Welbeck) Collection while the Portland (London) Collection contains papers relating to his estate business. The Portland Estate Papers held at Nottinghamshire Archives also contain items relating to Portland's properties.

== Arms ==
Coat of arms of William Bentinck, 4th Duke of Portland
Notes The title Duke of Portland was created by George I in 1716 . Coronet A Coronet of a Duke Crest Out of a ducal coronet proper two arms counter-embowed vested Gules, on the hands gloves Or, each holding an ostrich feather Argent (Bentinck); A snake nowed proper (Cavendish) Escutcheon Quarterly: 1st and 4th, Azure a cross moline Argent (Bentinck); 2nd and 3rd, Sable three stags' heads cabossed Argent attired Or, a crescent for difference (Cavendish) Supporters Two lions double queued, the dexter Or and the sinister sable Motto Craignez Honte (Fear Dishonour)

== Titles ==
His full titles were Duke of Portland, Marquess of Titchfield, Earl of Portland, Viscount Woodstock, and Baron Cirencester.

- The Most Honourable William Cavendish-Bentinck, Marquess of Titchfield (1768–1795)
- The Most Honourable William Cavendish-Scott-Bentinck, Marquess of Titchfield (1795–1809)
- His Grace The Duke of Portland (1809–1854)

== Ancestors ==
Ancestors of William Bentinck, 4th Duke of Portland

8. Henry Bentinck, 1st Duke of Portland
4. William Bentinck, 2nd Duke of Portland
9. Lady Elizabeth Noel
2. William Cavendish-Bentinck, 3rd Duke of Portland, Prime Minister of Great Britain
10. Edward Harley, 2nd Earl of Oxford and Earl Mortimer
5. Lady Margaret Cavendish Harley
11. Lady Henrietta Cavendish Holles
1. William Bentinck, 4th Duke of Portland
12. William Cavendish, 3rd Duke of Devonshire
6. William Cavendish, 4th Duke of Devonshire, Prime Minister of Great Britain
13. Catherine Hoskins
3. Lady Dorothy Cavendish
14. Richard Boyle, 3rd Earl of Burlington
7. Charlotte Boyle, 6th Baroness Clifford
15. Lady Dorothy Savile

== See also ==
- English Education Act 1835

Parliament of Great Britain
Preceded by Hon. George North; William Jolliffe	Member of Parliament for Petersfield; 1790–1791; With: William Jolliffe	Succeeded by Welbore Ellis; William Jolliffe
Preceded by The Earl Verney; James Grenville	Member of Parliament for Buckinghamshire; 1791–1800; With: James Grenville 1790–1797; Earl Temple 1797–1800	Succeeded by Parliament of the United Kingdom
Parliament of the United Kingdom
Preceded by Parliament of Great Britain	Member of Parliament for Buckinghamshire; 1801–1809; With: Earl Temple	Succeeded by Earl Temple; William Selby Lowndes
Political offices
Preceded by The Earl of Westmorland	Lord Privy Seal; 1827	Succeeded by The Earl of Carlisle
Preceded by —	Minister without Portfolio; 1827	Succeeded by —
Preceded by The Earl of Harrowby	Lord President of the Council; 1827–1828	Succeeded by The Earl Bathurst
Honorary titles
Preceded by In Commission	Lord Lieutenant of Middlesex; 1794–1841	Succeeded by The Marquess of Salisbury
Preceded by Henry Dundas	Custos Rotulorum of Middlesex; 1794–1841	Succeeded by The Marquess of Salisbury
Peerage of Great Britain
Preceded by William Cavendish-Bentinck	Duke of Portland; 1809–1854	Succeeded by William Cavendish-Scott-Bentinck
