= John Bentinck, 5th Duke of Portland =

British Army officer and politician (1800–1879)

His Grace The Duke of Portland
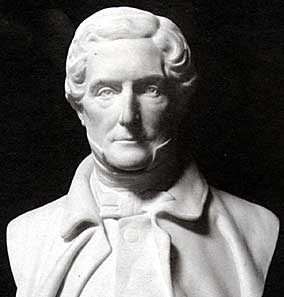
- Marble bust of the 5th Duke of Portland (1880) by Sir E. Boehm, c.1906

Member of Parliament for King's Lynn
- In office 9 March 1824 – 7 June 1826
- Preceded by: Marquess of Titchfield
- Succeeded by: Lord William Bentinck

Personal details
- Born: 17 September 1800 London, England
- Died: 6 December 1879 (aged 79) Harcourt House, London, England
- Party: Whig
- Parents: William Bentinck (father); Henrietta Scott (mother)

William John Cavendish-Scott-Bentinck, 5th Duke of Portland (17 September 1800 – 6 December 1879), styled Lord John Bentinck before 1824 and Marquess of Titchfield between 1824 and 1854, was a British Army officer and politician best known for his eccentric behaviour. A recluse who preferred to live in seclusion, he had an elaborate underground maze excavated under his estate at Welbeck Abbey near Clumber Park in North Nottinghamshire.

== Life ==
He was born in London, the second son of William Bentinck, 4th Duke of Portland, and his wife Henrietta, daughter of General John Scott. He was baptised at St George's Church, Hanover Square, on 30 September. One of nine children, he was known by his second Christian name, John, as all the male members of the family were named William. He was the brother of Charlotte Denison, future wife of Evelyn Denison, 1st Viscount Ossington.

Cavendish-Scott-Bentinck was educated at home rather than at school. Known as Lord John Bentinck, he served in the army from 1818, entering as an ensign in the Foot Guards and later transferred to the 7th Light Dragoon Guards in 1821, where he became a captain, then the 2nd Life Guards in 1823. He reportedly suffered from lethargy due to his "delicate health".

In 1824, he became known as Marquess of Titchfield following the death of his elder brother William Henry, and was elected Tory member of parliament (MP) to succeed his brother in King's Lynn, a seat traditionally held by a member of his family.

He remained an MP until 1826, when he surrendered his seat on grounds of ill-health to his uncle Lord William Bentinck.

From 1824 to 1834, he also held the rank of captain in the Royal West India Rangers, on half pay, a sinecure, since this regiment had been disbanded in 1819.

After leaving the army, he spent some time in continental Europe, his health being occasionally poor. His ailments included short-term memory loss and sciatica.

On 27 March 1854, he succeeded his father as 5th Duke of Portland. Although the title also gave him a seat in the House of Lords, it took him three years to take his seat, not taking the oaths until 5 June 1857. He showed little interest in taking an active role in politics, although he supported the Whigs and Robert Peel. From 1859 until his death he was also Deputy Lord Lieutenant of Nottinghamshire.

== Welbeck Abbey ==
The duke's major building operations and developments at his estate of Welbeck Abbey in which he took an active involvement appealed strongly to the popular imagination. They cost an enormous sum of money and employed thousands of men from the local area, both skilled and unskilled. While there were occasional labour disputes over wages and hours, the duke was on very good terms with his many employees and earned the nickname "the workman's friend".

=== Grounds ===
The house's kitchen gardens covered 22 acres (8.9 ha) encased in high walls with recesses in which braziers could be put to ripen fruit. One of the walls, for peaches, measured over 1,000 ft (300 m) in length.

An immense riding house was constructed, 396 ft (121 m) long, 108 ft (33 m) wide, and 50 ft (15 m) high. It was lit by 4,000 gas jets. His stables held 100 horses but he never rode them in his riding house.

When roller skating became popular, he had a rink installed near the lake for the benefit of his staff, whom he encouraged to use it.

=== House ===
The duke had all the rooms of Welbeck Abbey stripped of furniture, including tapestries and portraits, which he had stored elsewhere. He occupied a suite of four or five rooms in the west wing of the mansion which were sparsely furnished. By 1879, the building was in a state of disrepair, with the duke's rooms the only habitable ones. All the rooms had been painted pink, with bare parquetry floors and no furniture apart from a commode in one corner.

=== Underground ===
The duke's father, believing there would be a shortage of oak, had hundreds of trees planted. His son used the wood to construct a complex of underground rooms and tunnels. The tunnels under the estate were reputed to have totalled 15 mi (24 km), connecting various underground chambers and above-ground buildings. They included a 1,000 yd (910 m) long tunnel between the house and the riding house, wide enough for several people to walk side by side. A more roughly constructed tunnel ran parallel to this for the use of his workmen. A 1.25 mi (2 km) long tunnel ran north-east from the coach house, to emerge at the south Lodge, which was supposedly wide enough for two carriages. It had domed skylights (readily visible on the surface) and by night was illuminated by gaslight.

The underground chambers—all of which were painted pink—included a great hall 160 ft (49 m) long and 63 ft (19 m) wide, which was originally intended as a chapel, but which was instead used as a picture gallery and occasionally as a ballroom. The ballroom reportedly had a hydraulic lift that could carry 20 guests from the surface and a ceiling that was painted as a giant sunset. The duke never organised any dances in the ballroom.

Other subterranean rooms included a 250 ft (76 m) long library, an observatory with a large glass roof, and a vast billiards room. He constructed so many tunnels that he was probably the inspiration for Mr. Badger in Kenneth Grahame's The Wind in the Willows.

== Eccentricity ==
The duke was highly introverted and well known for his eccentricity; he did not want to meet people and never invited anyone to his home. He employed hundreds through his various construction projects, and though well paid, the employees were not allowed to speak to him or acknowledge him. The one worker who raised his hat to the duke was promptly dismissed. The tenants on his estates were aware of his wishes and knew they were required to ignore him if they passed by. His rooms had double letterboxes, one for in-coming and another for out-going mail. Only his valet was permitted to see him in person in his quarters—he would not even let the doctor in, while his tenants and workmen received all their instructions in writing.

His business with his solicitors, agents, and the occasional politician was handled by post. The duke maintained an extensive correspondence with a wide-ranging network of family and friends, including Benjamin Disraeli and Lord Palmerston. He is not known to have kept company with any ladies and his shyness and introverted personality increased over time. His reclusive lifestyle led to rumours that the duke was disfigured, mad, or prone to wild orgies, but contemporary witnesses and surviving photographs present him as a normal-looking man.

He ventured outside mainly by night, when he was preceded by a lady servant carrying a lantern 40 yards (37 m) ahead of him. If he did walk out by day, the duke wore two overcoats, an extremely tall hat, an extremely high collar, and carried a very large umbrella behind which he tried to hide if someone addressed him.

If the duke had business in London, he would take his carriage to Worksop where he had it loaded onto a railway wagon. Upon his arrival at his London residence, Harcourt House in Cavendish Square, all the household staff were ordered to keep out of sight as he hurried into his study through the front hall.

He insisted on a chicken roasting at all hours of the day and the servants brought him his food on heated trucks that ran on rails through the tunnels.

== Children ==
There is evidence to believe that the duke had a daughter, Fanny (later Fanny Lawson; 1855–1917), and possibly two sons, William (c. 1852–1870) and Joseph, all of them illegitimate. Fanny had two sons, George and Bertram Lawson, both of whom served with distinction in the military during World War I, and has numerous descendants living today. The duke had numerous intimate and discreet relationships during his lifetime, and his family was told that due to an accident in his youth he would probably be unable to have children. That diagnosis was incorrect; a modern medical opinion considers infertility "unlikely" as a result of that accident.

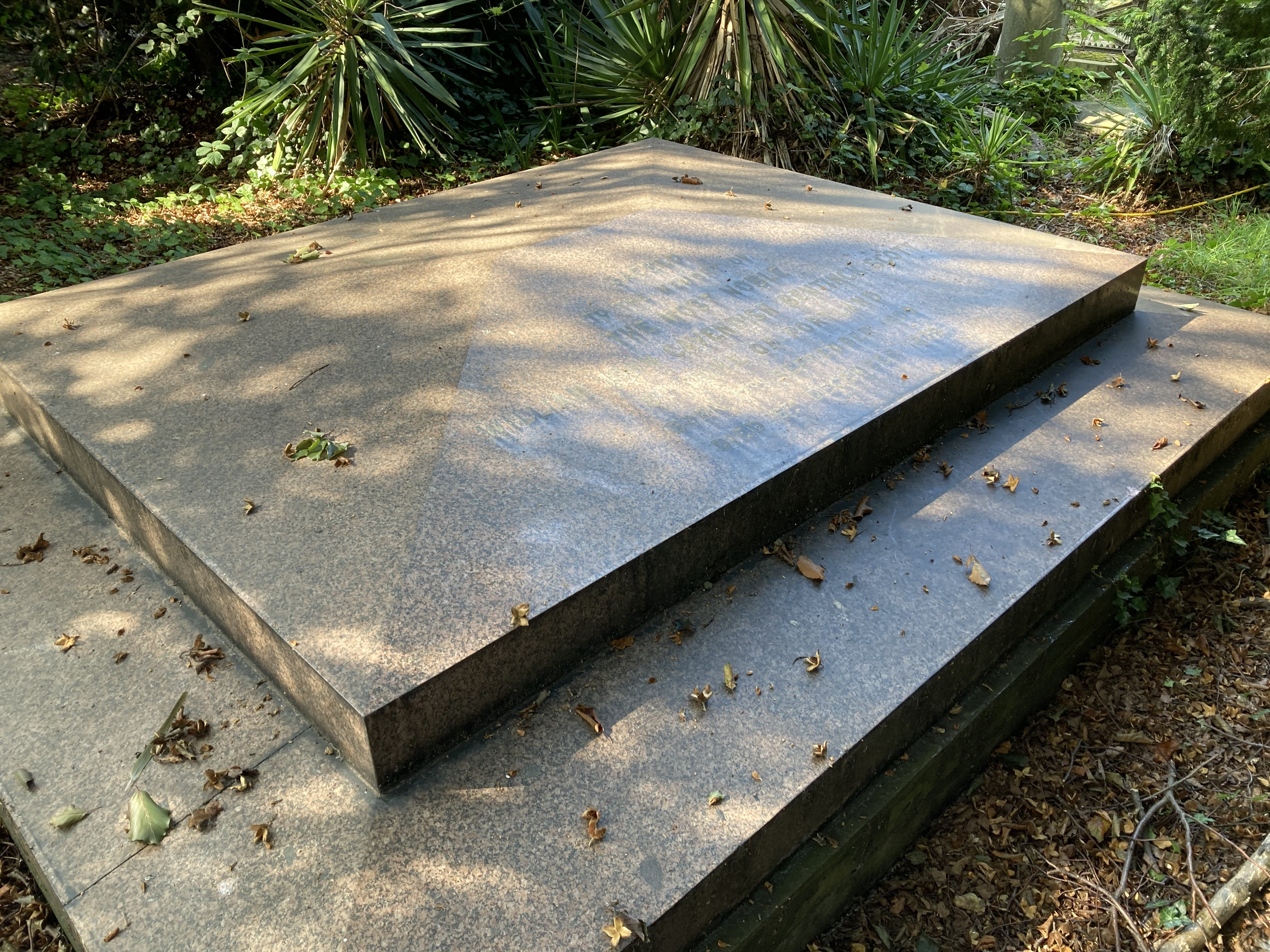
Grave of the Duke of Portland in Kensal Green Cemetery

== Death ==
The duke died on 6 December 1879 at his London residence, Harcourt House. He was buried in a simple grave in a large plot at Kensal Green Cemetery close to the Anglican chapel. As his younger brother, Henry William, had died without male issue on 31 December 1870, the title of Duke of Portland devolved upon his cousin William Cavendish-Bentinck.

The department of Manuscripts and Special Collections, The University of Nottingham, holds a number of papers relating to the 5th Duke: the 5th Duke's personal and political papers (Pw K) are part of the Portland (Welbeck) Collection; and the Portland (London) Collection (Pl) contains papers relating to the estate business of the 5th Duke, and to the "Druce Case". The Harley Gallery shows exhibitions from the Portland Collection, in the museum which is situated in the converted site of the Fifth Duke's Gas Works.

The Portland Estate Papers held at the Nottinghamshire Archives also contain items relating to the 5th Duke's properties.

== Druce case ==
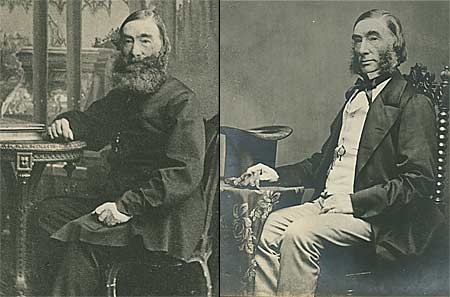
Photographs of T.C. Druce, 1860s [Pl L1/2/4/41 & Pl L1/2/4/43]

In 1897, a widow, Anna Maria Druce, claimed that the duke had led a double life as her father-in-law, Thomas Charles Druce of the furniture business Druce & Co., who had supposedly died in 1864. The widow claimed that the duke had faked the death of his alter ego Druce to return to a secluded aristocratic life and that therefore her son was heir to the Portland estate. Her application to have Druce's grave in Highgate Cemetery opened to show that the coffin buried in it was empty and weighted with lead was blocked by Druce's executor. The case became the subject of continuing and unsuccessful legal proceedings.

When it was discovered that Druce's children by a former wife were living in Australia, Anna Maria Druce's claims were backgrounded, but she was placed in an asylum in 1903. The case was taken up by George Hollamby Druce from 1903 onwards, who set up companies to finance his legal proceedings in 1905, and in 1907 even instituted a charge of perjury against Herbert Druce, the elder son of Thomas Charles Druce by his second wife, for having sworn that he had witnessed his father's death in 1864. Herbert had been born before his parents' marriage and thus was not eligible to claim the Portland title even if his father had been the duke.

The photograph which illustrates this article is that produced by the prosecution as being of the duke, but the defence denied this and said it was of Druce. Evidence of a fake burial was given by a witness named Robert C. Caldwell of New York and others, and it was eventually agreed that Druce's grave should be opened. This was done on 30 December 1907 under the supervision of Inspector Walter Dew and Druce's body was found present and successfully identified. Caldwell's evidence was so unreliable that the prosecution disowned him during the trial, and it transpired that he had habitually appeared in court giving sensational, and false, testimony. He was found insane and died in an asylum in 1911. Several witnesses were in turn charged with perjury.

== In popular culture ==
- R. Austin Freeman's crime novel Dr. Thorndyke Intervenes (1933) was based on the Druce-Portland case.
- 'The Portland Millions', episode 3 of the 1976 Granada television series Victorian Scandals, is entirely devoted to the case.
- In 1997, Mick Jackson published a book loosely based on the duke's life called The Underground Man, which was shortlisted for the Booker Prize.
- Bill Bryson discusses him in some detail during a visit to Welbeck Abbey in the travel book Notes from a Small Island.
- The Druce-Portland case is the subject of detailed examination in the book The Dead Duke, His Secret Wife, and the Missing Corpse, published in September 2014.

== Arms ==
Coat of arms of John Bentinck, 5th Duke of Portland
Notes The title Duke of Portland was created by George I in 1716. Coronet A Coronet of a Duke Crest 1st, out of a marquess's coronet proper, two arms counter-embowed, vested gules, on the hands gloves or, each holding an ostrich feather or (Bentinck); 2nd, a snake nowed proper (Cavendish). Escutcheon Quarterly: 1st and 4th grand quarters: quarterly, 1st and 4th azure, a cross moline argent (Bentinck); 2nd and 3rd, sable, three stags' heads cabossed argent, a crescent for difference (Cavendish); 2nd and 3rd grand quarters: or, on a bend azure, a star of six points between two crescents gold, within a bordure engrailed gules (Scott). Supporters Two lions double queued, the dexter Or and the sinister sable Motto Craignez Honte (Fear Dishonour)

== Titles ==
- Lord John Bentinck (1800–1824)
- Marquess of Titchfield (1824–1854)
- His Grace The Duke of Portland (1854–1879)

== Notes ==
Parliament of the United Kingdom
Preceded by Marquess of Titchfield; John Walpole	Member of Parliament for King's Lynn; 1824–1826; With: John Walpole	Succeeded by Lord William Henry Cavendish-Bentinck; John Walpole
Peerage of the United Kingdom
Preceded by William Cavendish-Scott-Bentinck	Duke of Portland; 1854–1879	Succeeded by William Cavendish-Bentinck
