= Listed buildings in Perlethorpe cum Budby =

Perlethorpe cum Budby is a civil parish in the Newark and Sherwood district of Nottinghamshire, England. The parish contains 62 listed buildings that are recorded in the National Heritage List for England. Of these, one is listed at Grade I, the highest of the three grades, two are at Grade II*, the middle grade, and the others are at Grade II, the lowest grade. The parish contains the villages of Perlethorpe and Budby, and the surrounding area. The most important and substantial building in the parish is Thoresby Hall, which is listed, together with associated structures, and buildings in the garden and park. Most of the other listed buildings are estate cottages, and the rest include a church and items in the churchyard, private houses, farmhouses and farm buildings, bridges, estate lodges, a pillarbox, former almshouses, a war memorial and a telephone kiosk.

== Key ==
Grade	Criteria
I	Buildings of exceptional interest, sometimes considered to be internationally important
II*	Particularly important buildings of more than special interest
II	Buildings of national importance and special interest

== Buildings ==
Name and location	Photograph	Date	Notes	Grade
White Moor House; 53.23165°N 1.02090°W	—	Late 17th century	The farmhouse is in partly rendered brick with stone dressings, plain and moulded eaves bands, a coped parapet to the south, and a hipped slate roof. There are two storeys and attics, and a square plan, with fronts of four and five bays. On the south front is a single-storey extension containing a central doorway with a rusticated surround, a pulvinated frieze, a triple keystone, and a pediment. The windows are sashes, and in the attics are dormers, some gabled, some with segmental heads, and some pedimented. On the west front is a single-storey canted bay window, and the east front has a two-storey canted bay window with a parapet and a French window.	II
Cascade; 53.22905°N 1.04615°W		c. 1685	The cascade at the east end of Thoresby Lake, which was altered in 1791 by Humphry Repton, consists of two channels of natural stone flanking a central island. On the north side is an incomplete clapper bridge.	II
Statue, Thoresby Hall; 53.23509°N 1.04503°W		c. 1685	The statue of a sphinx is by C. G. Cibber. It is in stone, and is on a rectangular plinth in rendered brick with a moulded stone base.	II
Group of four headstones 53.23195°N 1.03341°W	—	Early 18th century	The headstones are in the churchyard of St John's Church, Perlethorpe, to the southeast of the church. They have different shaped heads and inscriptions, and are dated between 1706 and 1749.	II
Ice house southeast of Thoresby Hall; 53.23035°N 1.04392°W	—	Early 18th century	The ice house is in stone and brick. To the east are the remains of a doorway with a segmental head and brick piers. The ice house has a barrel vaulted chamber, with two doorways to the north, one with a round head.	II
Sundial, Thoresby Hall; 53.23289°N 1.04488°W	—	Early 18th century	The sundial in the garden to the south of the hall was made by Thomas Wright, and is in stone. It consists of a baluster stem with a moulded foot and head. On the top is an inscribed bronze dial.	II*
The Kennels; 53.23652°N 1.02902°W		Mid 18th century	A gatehouse and kennels, it was altered in about 1789 by John Carr, and later converted into a house. It is in rendered stone on a plinth, with stone dressings, a moulded cornice, an eaves band, and slate roofs. The main block is pedimented, and has two storeys and three bays. On the front are four giant diced pilasters, and in the centre is a moulded arch with a keystone. The windows in the ground floor are round-headed sashes, and the upper floor contains flat-headed casements. The flanking walls are coped, with three bays containing round-headed dummy sash windows, corner pilasters and fluted vase finials. To the right is a rendered boundary wall containing a pair of gate piers with bands, paterae and square domed caps.	II
Urn, Thoresby Hall; 53.23367°N 1.04439°W	—	1773	The urn was moved to the east forecourt lawn in 2012. It is in stone and has a square base with a moulded plinth and cornice. The urn is in the form of a draped egg cup on a square base, with feather ornament, a turned foot and cap, and a partially erased inscription.	II
Pierrepont Bridge; 53.22537°N 1.07022°W	—	Late 18th century	The bridge carries a road over the River Meden and is in stone. It consists of a single segmental arch, with a moulded soffit and parapet, and a plain string course. The parapet walls are splayed, with moulded coping, and they contain four square piers with rebated corners, moulded plinths and caps. The east side has a low parapet with fragments of a former balustrade.	II
Poplars Farmhouse; 53.22270°N 1.07571°W	—	Late 18th century	The farmhouse is in rendered brick, with a floor band, corbelled eaves and a pantile roof. There are two storeys and attics, three bays, and a continuous rear outshut. The windows are casements, some with Gothick tracery. In the centre is a doorway with a segmental head, and at the rear is a single-storey wash house and brick porch.	II
Memorial cross 53.22251°N 1.06075°W	—	1788	The cross was erected in Thoresby Park to commemorate victory in the Battle of the Nile, and is in gritstone. It has a square base, and an octagonal section with domed ends. On the cross is an inscription, and on the base are later inscriptions relating to the Diamond Jubilee of Queen Victoria in 1897.	II
Budby Castle; 53.22306°N 1.07145°W	—	1789	An eyecatcher, later an estate cottage, designed by John Carr in the form of a castle. It is in stone and brick on a plinth, with stone dressings, a moulded string course and eaves, embattled parapets, and slate roofs. There are two storeys and three bays, in two square blocks with round corner towers. The windows are of mixed types, Gothick, Moorish and casements, some with projecting architraves and most with hood moulds, and the doorways have pointed heads.	II
Ceres Lodge Farmhouse, cottages and stable 53.21919°N 1.05993°W	—	c. 1800	The buildings are in brick, partly rendered and colourwashed, on a plinth, with an impost band, moulded eaves, cornice and pediment, and hipped slate roofs. There are two storeys, and a C-shaped plan, with five bays at the front. The middle bay of the farmhouse projects under a pediment, and has a porch with a round-arched opening and a parapet, and the windows are casements. The stable to the west has two storeys, three bays, and cogged eaves. Some of the windows in the cottage to the south are Gothick casements, and there is a further cottage to the north.	II
Monument to Nelson's Navy; 53.22590°N 1.05663°W	—	c. 1800	The monument was erected in Thoresby Park to commemorate victory in the Battle of the Nile, it is in stone, and stands on a square base of two steps. The monument consists of a pedestal with a moulded plinth and cornice, and a hipped cap. On the south side is a partially erased verse inscription.	II
The Nelson Pyramid; 53.22417°N 1.06387°W	—	c. 1800	The monument was erected in Thoresby Park to commemorate victory in the Battle of the Nile. It is in stone with cladding in Westmorland slate, and in the form of a pyramid. On the north side is a portico that has Etruscan columns with square capitals, and an inscribed frieze. Inside the portico are inscribed names and a verse, and inside the monument is a round domed chamber with a bench and doors.	II
Urn in Ice House Wood; 53.22628°N 1.04585°W	—	1802	The urn is by Coade and Sealy, and is in Coade stone. It has a square stone plinth of two steps, on which is a square pedestal with a moulded plinth and cornice, and a partly erased inscription. The urn is egg-shaped in Adam style, with swags and a domed top.	II
Castle View and adjoining cottage 53.22249°N 1.07579°W	—	c. 1807	A pair of estate cottages in rendered brick on a stone plinth, with a floor band, deep eaves and a hipped slate roof. There are two storeys, four bays and a square plan. Most of the windows are Gothick casements. There are two gabled porches each with square columns, a dentilled pediment and an oval-headed door, and at the rear are two gabled timber porches.	II
North Farmhouse; 53.22573°N 1.07616°W		c. 1807	The farmhouse is in rendered brick and stone on a rendered plinth, with a partial floor band and a hipped tile roof. Thee are two storeys, three bays and a rear wing. Most of the windows are Gothick casements. The middle bay on the front is bowed, it contains three round-arched openings and a recessed doorway, and above it is a gable with applied timber framing.	II
Park View and adjoining cottage 53.22375°N 1.07571°W		c. 1807	A pair of estate cottages in rendered brick on a stone plinth, with deep eaves and slate roofs. There are two storeys, three bays, and a cruciform plan with canted ends. Most of the windows are Gothick casements, and at the rear is a gabled dormer. Also at the rear is a single-storey outbuilding with two bays.	II
Former Village Room; 53.22354°N 1.07572°W	—	1807	Originally a school and later a private house, it is in rendered brick on a stone plinth, with stone dressings and a hipped slate roof. There are two storeys, three bays, and a rear lean-to. In the centre is a canted portico with three round-arched openings, a band and a coping parapet containing inscribed plaques. Most of the windows are Gothick casements, and there are dormers, one with a flat roof and two with hipped roofs.	II
Woodview and adjoining cottage 53.22336°N 1.07572°W	—	c. 1807	A pair of estate cottages in rendered brick on a stone plinth, with corbelled eaves and a hipped slate roof. There are two storeys, three bays, and a cruciform plan with canted ends. Most of the windows are Gothick casements, and at the rear is a single-storey outbuilding with two bays and a pantile roof.	II
Monument to Spencer Perceval; 53.22950°N 1.04311°W	—	1812	The monument commemorating Spencer Perceval consists of a stone sarcophagus on a base. The base is recangular and has an inscribed plinth anda moulded cornice. The sarcophagus has scalloped rounded ends, scrolled reeded cradles, and a hipped lid.	II
Sarcophagus, St John's Church, Perlethorpe; 53.23185°N 1.03358°W	—	1812	The sarcophagus at the east end of the churchyard is in stone on a brick supporting wall with stone coping. It has an inscribed plinth, a rectangular base with a partly erased inscription, and a moulded cornice. The sarcophagus has a hipped lid and ball feet.	II
1 Main Street, Budby; 53.22675°N 1.07903°W	—	Early 19th century	An estate cottage in rendered brick on a rendered plinth, with a partial band, deeply rebated eaves, and a hipped pantile roof. There is a single storey and attics, a single bay, and a square plan. The windows are Gothick casements. On the south front is a canted bay window, and the roof is extended to form a porch with a canted doorway. In the roof are gabled dormers.	II
2 and 3 Main Street, Budby; 53.22647°N 1.07871°W	—	Early 19th century	A pair of estate cottages in rendered brick and partly colourwashed, on a rendered plinth, with pantile roofs. There is a single storey with attics, and an L-shaped plan with gabled rear wings. Most of the windows are Gothick casements. On the south front is a projecting cross wing with a gabled porch containing a canted doorway and canted blank openings on the sides, and there is another gabled porch on the east front with a canted doorway. In the roof are gabled dormers.	II
Budby Bridge; 53.22480°N 1.07535°W		Early 19th century	The bridge carries Worksop Road (A616 road) over the River Meden. It is in stone, and consists of three semicircular arches, the central arch larger. The bridge has plain piers, a string course, and a splayed parapet with saddleback coping.	II
Cameleon Lodge; 53.23080°N 1.06315°W		Early 19th century	The lodge to Thoresby Hall is in colourwashed rendered brick, on a plinth, with moulded and modillion eaves and a hipped Westmorland slate roof. There are two storeys, three bays flanked by single-storey pavilions with pyramidal roofs, a double depth square plan, and a rear wing. Most of the windows are Gothick casements. In the centre is a porch with a round-arched doorway, a parapet and a recessed door.	II
Carey's Cottage and Green Meadows; 53.22350°N 1.07736°W		Early 19th century	A pair of estate cottages in rendered brick with roofs of pantile and slate. There are two storeys, and an L-shaped plan, they are two bays wide and five bays deep. Most of the windows are Gothick casements. On the south front is a latticed iron porch and a doorway with moulded jambs. The east front has a lean-to porch, a single-storey outbuilding and a timber shed.	II
Barn and stables, Ceres Lodge Farm; 53.21942°N 1.06005°W	—	Early 19th century	The farm buildings are in brick with roofs in slate and corrugated sheet. They are in one and two storeys, and consist of a three-bay stable, a three-bay barn containing a central doorway and casement windows, and to the right is a four-bay stable containing a stable door and casement windows, all with segmental heads.	II
Home Farmhouse, wall and outbuilding 53.23252°N 1.02950°W		Early 19th century	The farmhouse is in colourwashed rendered brick, with deep rebated eaves and a hipped slate roof. There are two storeys, an L-shaped plan, a front range of three bays, and a single-bay service wing to the right. In the centre is a canted porch with three round-arched openings and a hipped roof, and most of the windows are Gothick casements. In the service wing is a gabled dormer. To the east is an outbuilding with a pantile roof, and to the north is a stable range with 15 bays, containing a gabled carriage entry with an elliptical head and bargeboards. Outside is a curved stone dwarf wall with an iron railing, containing two pairs of fluted gate piers with ball finials, and iron gates with scroll tops.	II
Meden Cottage; 53.22575°N 1.07659°W		Early 19th century	An estate cottage in rendered brick on a stone plinth, with a hipped tile roof. There are two storeys, three bays, and lean-to wings. The windows are casements, some with Gothick tracery. In the right recessed bay is a round-headed doorway, and at the rear is a gabled dormer. To the south is a boundary wall containing doorways with round and segmental heads, and to the east is a coped wall linking to an outbuilding with a single storey and three bays.	II
Meden View and Wayside; 53.22621°N 1.07823°W	—	Early 19th century	A pair of estate cottages in rendered brick on a rendered plinth, with deep eaves and pantile roofs. There is a single storey and attics and an L-shaped plan, with a front of three bays, the right bay a projecting gabled cross-wing, a lean-to extension on the right, and rear outbuildings. The windows are casements, some with Gothick tracery. In the left bay is a gabled porch with a canted opening and a recessed doorway, in the lean-to is a blank canted opening, and in the attic is a gabled dormer.	II
Rose Cottage; 53.22529°N 1.02274°W	—	Early 19th century	An estate cottage in colourwashed rendered brick, with deep eaves and a hipped slate roof. There are two storeys, three bays, and a cruciform plan with canted ends. The windows are casements, some with Gothick tracery. There are round-headed recesses, some blank and the others containing windows, and in an angle at the rear is a porch.	II
Sharida and wall 53.22358°N 1.07621°W	—	Early 19th century	The house is in rendered brick with roofs of pantile and slate. There are two storeys, a T-shaped plan, a front of two bays, and a service wing to the west. Most of the windows are Gothick casements, and the central doorway has a tiled hood on brackets. The boundary wall to the left is in brick with stone coping, and at the north front is a dwarf wall with an iron railing and a scroll-top iron gate.	II
Sherwood House, wall and railings 53.22365°N 1.07659°W		Early 19th century	The house, which was later extended and divided, is in rendered brick on a stone plinth, with shaped eaves brackets, and roofs of pantile, lead and slate. There are two storeys, the main block has fronts of three and five bays, to the west is a single-storey extension with two bays, and to the south are two extensions, each with two storeys and a single bay. Most of the windows are Gothick casements. In the centre is a canted porch with a hipped roof containing three round-arched openings and a recessed doorway. Adjoining the house is a dwarf stone boundary wall with an iron railing and a gate.	II
South Farmhouse; 53.22323°N 1.07768°W		Early 19th century	The farmhouse is in rendered brick and has a slate roof. There are two storeys and attics, a double depth plan, three bays, and a single-storey extension to the north. Most of the windows are Gothick casements. In the centre is a canted porch with a hipped roof containing three round-arched openings and a recessed doorway.	II
The Archers; 53.22599°N 1.07782°W	—	Early 19th century	An estate cottage in rendered brick on a rendered plinth, with overhanging rebated eaves and pantile roofs. There is a single storey and attics, two bays, and a square plan with lean-tos. The windows are Gothick casements, and there are gabled dormers. The doorway has a canted head, and there is a porch in a return angle.	II
The Buck Gates; 53.22282°N 1.02254°W		Early 19th century	A pair of ornamental gate piers in rendered brick on a chamfered plinth, that were moved to their present site in 1959. Each pier has a central round-headed opening, an impost band, and a moulded cornice, and above is a rectangular base formerly carrying a statue.	II
The Chaplain's House; 53.23341°N 1.02802°W		Early 19th century	Two cottages combined into one house, it is in colourwashed rendered brick, with deep eaves and a slate roof. There are two storeys, three bays, and a square plan with a rear wing. The windows are casements, some with Gothick tracery, and the lintels have splayed heads.	II
The Green Bridge; 53.23103°N 1.04202°W		Early 19th century	The bridge carries a track over the River Meden, it is in stone and consists of a single segmental arch. The bridge has flanking pilasters, and a moulded soffit and keystone. There is a pair of curved, stepped flanking walls with a dentilled cornice, on which is a cast iron balustrade with guilloché-work open piers, and four double-size end piers with square stone bases.	II
The White Lodge; 53.22310°N 1.02281°W	—	Early 19th century	The lodge is in colourwashed rendered brick on a rendered plinth, with stone dressings, sill and floor bands, moulded and dentilled eaves, and a slate roof. There are two storeys and a T-shaped plan, with a front range of five bays, and a double-gabled rear wing. Most of the windows are Gothick casements. On the front is a projecting pedimented bay containing a gabled porch with bargeboards, and a doorway with a segmental head. At the west end is a conservatory.	II
Woodland View; 53.22411°N 1.07614°W		Early 19th century	An estate cottage in rendered brick on a stone plinth, with a hipped slate roof. There are two storeys, three bays, and a square plan with a lean-to extension on the west. Most of the windows are casements, some with Gothick tracery. The middle bay in the east front is recessed and flanked by square piers, it contains a porch with a hipped roof, and to the south is a doorway with a moulded surround. To the west is a single-storey outbuilding in brick and a toilet block, both with pantile roofs.	II
Perlethorpe Bridge; 53.23361°N 1.02960°W		1847	The bridge carries a road over the River Meden, and is in brick with stone dressings. It consists of a single segmental arch with a stone soffit and keystone, and a brick parapet with stone coping and four square piers with pyramidal caps.	II
Boundary wall, 1–6 Main Street, Budby; 53.22653°N 1.07895°W	—	Mid 19th century	The boundary and retaining wall is in rock-faced stone with half-round coping. It contains twelve gate piers, and extends for about 150 metres (490 ft).	II
Garden urn, Castle View; 53.22250°N 1.07561°W	—	Mid 19th century	The urn in the front garden is in stone on a square base with a moulded plinth and cornice. It has a ringed stem and a gadrooned bowl.	II
Bridge east of Green Bridge; 53.23318°N 1.03944°W		Mid 19th century	The bridge carries a road over the River Meden in Thoresby Park. It is in stone, and consists of a single segmental arch with a chamfered and rebated soffit and string course. The bridge has a curved coped balustrade with square corner piers and eight ball finials.	II
Ice House on Island; 53.22863°N 1.04774°W	—	Mid 19th century	The ice house is in brick with stone dressings. The L-plan entrance has ramped brick retaining walls with chamfered coping, and the doorway has a segmental head. On the top is a pentagonal capstone.	II
Meadow Cottages, 1 and 2 Post Office Drive; 53.23506°N 1.03068°W		Mid 19th century	A pair of ornamental mirror-image estate cottages in coloured brick on a plinth, with dressings in buff brick and stone, a cogged floor band, and steep patterned tile roofs with gables and bargeboards, a decorated ridge and finials. There are two storeys, a T-shaped plan, a front of two bays, and a double-gabled rear wing. Most of the windows are casements. In the ground floor are canted bay windows, flanked by doorways with hoods on curving brackets, and the upper floor contains two oriel windows on moulded corbels with hipped roofs.	II
Meadow Cottages, 3 and 4 Post Office Drive; 53.23522°N 1.03076°W		Mid 19th century	A pair of ornamental mirror-image estate cottages in coloured brick on a plinth, with dressings in buff brick and stone, a cogged floor band, and steep patterned tile roofs with gables and bargeboards, a decorated ridge and finials. There are two storeys, a T-shaped plan, a front of two bays, and a double-gabled rear wing. Most of the windows are casements. In the ground floor are canted bay windows, flanked by doorways with hoods on curving brackets, and the upper floor contains two oriel windows on moulded corbels with hipped roofs.	II
Pillarbox; 53.22387°N 1.07614°W		c. 1860	The pillarbox, which was designed by John Penfold, is in cast iron on a moulded plinth. It has a hexagonal plan, and contains a horizontal slit, the Royal Arms and a monogram, and has a corniced ogee domed cap with a lotus bud finial.	II
Boundary wall and lych gate, St John's Church, Perlethorpe; 53.23156°N 1.03437°W		1861	The wall is the older, with the lych gate dating from 1918. Enclosing the churchyard is a dwarf stone wall containing gabled intermediate piers and larger cross-gabled corner piers. On the wall is patterned wrought iron railing with fleur-de-lys heads. The gate piers are cross-gabled, and the gates match the railing. The lych gate has two stone piers, each with a brass memorial tablet, and four timber posts carrying a slate roof with a trussed gable and bargeboards. To the south is a four-centred arched opening with an inscribed transom, and the gates are wooden with iron crosses.	II
North lamp at west gate, St John's Church, Perlethorpe; 53.23175°N 1.03494°W	—	c. 1861	The lamp is in sheet and cast iron on a rendered brick plinth. It has a ringed round stem with an octagonal foot, and an openwork octagonal lantern with a finial.	II
South lamp at west gate, St John's Church, Perlethorpe; 53.23168°N 1.03492°W	—	c. 1861	The lamp is in sheet and cast iron on a rendered brick plinth. It has a ringed round stem with an octagonal foot, and an openwork octagonal lantern with a finial.	II
Thoresby Hall, outbuildings, gate and railings 53.23362°N 1.04492°W		1864–71	A country house, later a hotel, designed by Anthony Salvin. It is in stone with slate roofs, and forms four ranges around a courtyard. The windows are mullioned or mullioned and transomed, and other features include chamfered rusticated quoins, panelled parapets with pierced decoration and strapwork, shaped gables, urns, bay windows and dormers. The entrance front has three storeys and attics and nine bays. In the centre is a three-storey porte cochère containing three round-arched openings and a two-storey canted oriel window, and above it is a bell tower with a domed octagonal cupola. On the left corner is a tower with two square domed cupolas, and the right corner has a narrower tower with a single cupola. The entrance court is flanked by walls with parapets and urns, and to the east is a dwarf boundary wall with wrought iron railings, gate piers, gates and lamp brackets.	I
Terrace walls and gazebos, Thoresby Hall; 53.23292°N 1.04412°W		1864	The terrace walls and gazebos were designed by Anthony Salvin and are in stone. There are parallel walls on two levels, with pilasters, moulded plinths and copings, and on them are obelisk and lion finials, and urns. The lower wall has a projecting square central bay, and at the corners are octagonal gazebos with round-headed openings, and strapwork parapets.	II
Fountain south of Thoresby Hall; 53.23268°N 1.04485°W		1865	The fountain, which was designed by Anthony Salvin, is in stone. It has an octagonal basin with a moulded rim, and four small moulded semicircular flanking basins, each with an animal mask spout. The central jet is carved and moulded, with scroll brackets and a shallow bowl.	II
Stable court, stable cottages and riding school, Thoresby Hall; 53.23514°N 1.04509°W		1865	The buildings were designed by Anthony Salvin and are in stone with slate roofs. The stable block consists of four ranges around a courtyard, and to the north are cottages and a riding school. The east front has two storeys and seven bays, and a central gabled porch with a round-headed arch, octagonal flanking turrets, pepperpot domes and finials. In the outer bays are large bracketed dormers containing round-headed loading doors, and small gabled dormers. The windows in the block are mullioned casements. The head gardener's cottage to the north has two storeys and five bays, the stable cottage has four bays, and the riding school has six bays.	II
Round stable, Thoresby Hall; 53.23575°N 1.04440°W		Late 19th century	The stable block is in brick with a gabled slate roof and a lead ridge. There is a single storey, ten bays, and a circular plan around a small yard. The stable doors have segmental rubbed brick heads, and the windows are bottom-hinged casements with timber lintels.	II
St John's Church, Perlethorpe; 53.23176°N 1.03449°W		1876	The church was designed by Anthony Salvin, and it was restored in 1904. It is built in stone with a slate roof, and consists of a nave with a clerestory, north and south aisles, a south porch, a chancel, an organ chamber, a vestry, and a west steeple. The steeple has a tower with three stages, clasping buttresses, three string courses, a traceried panel band, an embattled parapet with four gabled crocketed pinnacles and four gargoyles, and a recessed octagonal spire with moulded arrises, two tiers of gabled lucarnes, and a finial. On the west side is a doorway with a moulded surround, shafts and a hood mould, the middle stage contains a square window with a quatrefoil, and the bell openings have two lights and a linked hood mould.	II*
The Almshouses And Tudor Lodge; 53.23182°N 1.03077°W	—	1894	Two houses, originally almshouses, in brick, on a plinth with applied timber framing with colourwashed plaster infill, and tile roofs. There are two storeys, five bays, alternate bays projecting and gabled, and an E-shaped plan. The doorways have ogee rubbed brick heads, and the windows are cross and mullioned casements, At the north end is a link to a former wash house with a single storey and three bays.	II
Budby War Memorial; 53.22419°N 1.07548°W		1921	The war memorial stands in a triangular area surrounded by road, south of Busby Bridge. It is in Clipsham stone, and consists of a cross with a wreath carved in relief, on a square plinth. On the plinth are two plaques with inscriptions and the names of those lost in the two World Wars. The war memorial is on a stone platform with steps, and stone bollards linked by a chain.	II
Telephone kiosk 53.22392°N 1.07632°W		1935	The K6 type telephone kiosk in Budby was designed by Giles Gilbert Scott. Constructed in cast iron with a square plan and a dome, it has three unperforated crowns in the top panels.	II
