= A616 road =

Road in England

A616

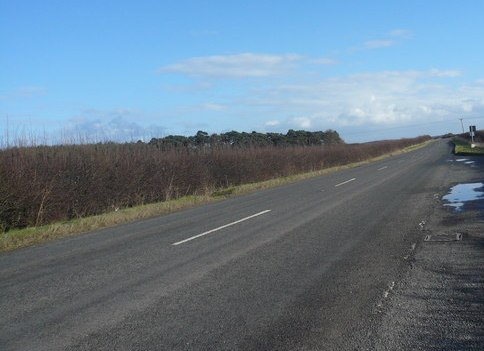

Major junctions
- East end: Newark-on-Trent; 53.0836°N 0.8167°W
- A46 A617 A6075 A614; A60 A632 A618 A619 A6135; M1; A61 A629 A6102 A628 A635 A6024; A62
- West end: Huddersfield; 53.6424°N 1.7842°W

Location
- Country: United Kingdom
- Primary destinations: Barlborough, Sheffield, Stocksbridge

Road network
- Roads in the United Kingdom; Motorways; A and B road zones

The A616 is a road that links Newark-on-Trent, Nottinghamshire, to the M1 motorway at Junction 30, then reappears at Junction 35A and goes on to Huddersfield, West Yorkshire.

The road originally ran continuously from Newark to Huddersfield, via Sheffield city centre. The section of route between the M1 Junction 30 and Sheffield was re-numbered A6135, and the route north-west of Sheffield largely renumbered the A6102.

== Route ==
=== Newark to Barlborough ===
Similar to the A57, this section of the road is used to connect traffic heading to and from West and South Yorkshire with routes for the A1 to the south-east. The advantages of the A616 are that it is less well known than the A57 as a through-route and does not pass through large centres of population.

It starts in the south at the busy roundabout with the A617 and A46 (Newark bypass), known as the Cattle Market Island. This is the third position of its southern terminus. When the A1 ran through Newark, before July 1964, it met the A1 further towards Newark Castle railway station, by continuing from its present route down Debdale Hill then through Kelham, where it met the A617, and along the present-day A617 near what is the present-day Trent Valley Way. After the A1 bypass was built, the A1 through Newark became the A6065, and the former A616 became an unclassified road from Toll Bar Farm to Kelham, and the A617 from Kelham to Newark. The A616 then followed a former unclassified road to South Muskham, where it met the A6065. When the Newark Bypass was built in 1989, the A6065 was removed and the A616 extended from South Muskham to Newark along the former A6065.

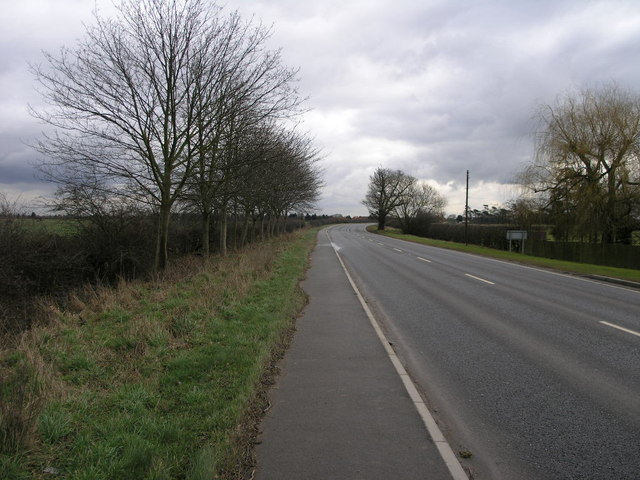
Towards Newark

The former A1 into Newark from the roundabout is the B6326. For just under two miles it follows the former A1 north to South Muskham, passing a large British Sugar sugar beet processing plant on the right. This is now one of the main sugar beet factories left, as many in the region have closed. It runs parallel to the East Coast Main Line, which can be seen to the east. On the former Great North Road, it passes over a causeway built in 1770 by John Smeaton. At Muskham Bridge it crosses the River Trent. At South Muskham the road leaves to the west with the northern former A1 continuing as the B6325. It passes through Little Carlton, part of South Muskham parish. It climbs Debdale Hill and meets a road from Kelham, to the left. It passes Debdale Hill Farm as Ollerton Road. Over the brow of the hill, it enters Caunton parish, where the road has been straightened, leaving lay-bys on both sides of the road. It passes Dean Hall Farm and there is a crossroads for Knapthorpe to the left and Caunton to the right. There is a left turn for Maplebeck near Beesthorpe Hall, and a right turn from Caunton.

It passes Lodge Farm and Caunton Common Farm. On the parish boundary between Kneesall and Kersall, there is a crossroads for Kersall to the left and Laxton and Norwell to the right, near Kersall Lodge. It passes Buckshaw Farm, then a straightened bend with a layby on the right, and then through Kneesall, passing the church of St Bartholomew and the Angel Inn. It is crossed by a 400 kV pylon line and passes through the small village of Ompton. It climbs Grimston Hill, entering the parish of Wellow. It passes through Wellow, meeting a road from the left from Eakring, and passing the Durham Ox. There is an angled crossroads for Rufford (and the Sherwood Castle Holiday Forest) to the left and New Ollerton to the right, and the road passes of a former railway. It enters Ollerton, crossing a railway. There is a roundabout with the A6075, to the left for New Ollerton, with which the road overlaps for a half-mile to the west. The B6461 is to the left, and the road crosses the River Maun. There is a roundabout at Sherwood Heath with the north-south A614 and the A6075 to the south-west for Thoresby Colliery and Edwinstowe, at which there is the Shell Ollerton garage, a fish and chip restaurant, and the Texaco Ollerton Star Service Station.

It passes through what is Sherwood Forest at Bilhaugh in Edwinstowe parish, and meets Swincote Road (B6034) to the left, from Edwinstowe, and overlaps with the road. In Perlethorpe cum Budby, it passes through Budby as Worksop Road and crosses the River Meden to the west of Thoresby Lake. At Budby North Forest the A6034 leaves to the right (the north), and slightly further north is a crossroads with Netherfield Lane. At Hazel Gap the road continues due west and is crossed by the Robin Hood Way near Hazel Gap Farm in the parish of Norton. The road enters Bassetlaw and passes along the northern edge of Gleadthorpe Breck Plantation and Hatfield Plantation, north of Welbeck Colliery. There is a right turn for Norton and the road meets the north–south A60 at Cuckney, where the A632 leaves for Bolsover to the south-west. In the village the road passes the Greendale Oak. It leaves to the west as Creswell Road, crossing the River Poulter.

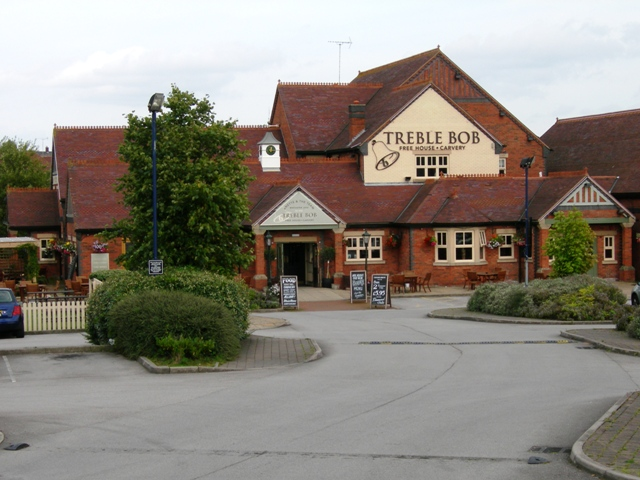
Treble Bob at Barlborough

It passes Woodend Farm and there is a crossroads for Whaley and Holbeck. The road enters Derbyshire and the district of Bolsover, south of Creswell. Entering the (former mining) village of Creswell it meets the B6042 to the right, for Creswell Crags, a limestone gorge. There is a left turn for Elmton Road, for the model village. There is a height indicator across the road with dangling chains for the approaching railway bridge which has a height of 4.1 metres. Towards Clowne the road follows to the north of a disused railway, and passes the Creswell Campus of Chesterfield College, before crossroads, for Elmton to the left. Entering Clowne there is a crossroads where it is crossed by the Archaeological Way. It passes the JET Woodall Garage, and meets the B6418 from the left and the terminus of the A618, Rotherham Road for Killamarsh, to the right. It leaves as Barlborough Road, passing through New Barlsborough. The road used to pass through Barlborough, but now passes to the south. The Crown Carveries De Rodes Arms is on the former roundabout with the A619. It leaves the former route to the left at a roundabout, and there is a roundabout for the Dobbies garden centre and Barlborough Links Golf Club, and another for the Barlborough Links retail park and a large Tesco distribution centre on Barlborough Common. There is a roundabout with the earlier route around Barlborough, where it meets the east-west A619. At this roundabout is the Ibis Chesterfield North hotel and the Treble Bob pub-restaurant. Continuing the earlier diversion around Barlborough, built at the time of the M1 in 1967, it meets the M1 at junction 30, where it continues into Sheffield as the A6135. The route was renumbered when junction 35A of the M1 was built in 1988.

=== Tankersley to Huddersfield ===
The northern section resumes at the end of the slip roads of junction 35A of the M1 at Tankersley, at a roundabout for Warren and a business park. To the north is Tankersley Hall, which featured in the film Kes. At this point it is the boundary between the boroughs of Sheffield (to the south), and Barnsley (to the north), with the road in the borough of Barnsley. To the right is a turn off for Tankersley Park golf club. It skirts the north of New Biggin Plantation and Westwood Country Park, and is crossed by the Barnsley Boundary Walk, and the Trans Pennine Trail. At Upper Tankersley there is a busy roundabout with Westwood New Road (A61) at the Shell Wentworth Park Service Station, and to the north is the Wentworth Industrial Park. There is a Premier Inn on the right, next door to one of Britain's seven Taybarns pubs. From here the Sheffield-Barnsley boundary follows the A61 southwards to the A629 junction. It crosses the Storrs Dike near Bromley. It skirts the south of Copley Wood, and at Wortley meets the A629 at a grade separated junction – one of two junctions of this type along the road. Woodhead Road, for Wadsley Bridge, also joins from the south. Near Gosling Moor Farm, it is crossed by the Trans Pennine Trail and a former railway.

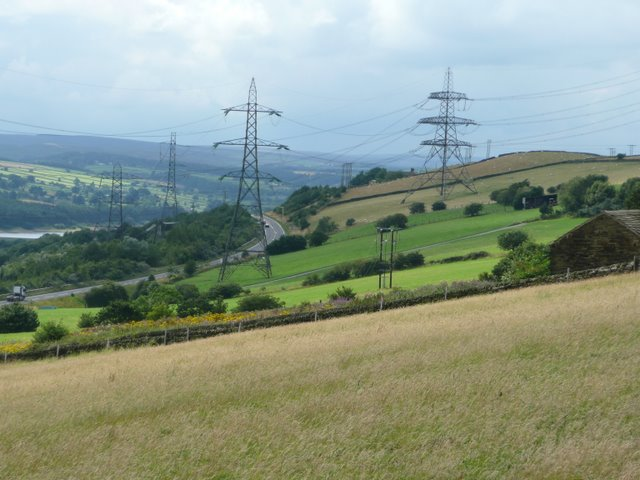
Stocksbridge bypass

It crosses the River Don where it enters the borough of Sheffield. There is a grade-separated junction with the A6102, for Sheffield and the former route, which is the eastern end of the Stocksbridge bypass. The former route through Stocksbridge is the B6088. It passes along the northern edge of Stocksbridge on an escarpment overlooking the town. A 400 kV pylon line follows the road. The road, a downgraded M67, is a 2+1 road. This is not adequate for the quantity of traffic it carries, and would have been originally designed as a dual-carriageway as it is a well-engineered road. It passes Wellhouse Farm and is crossed by Pearoyd Lane, where it overlooks the former steelworks to the south. It passes Cote House Farm, and meets the former route, the B6088, from the left which is the western end of the Stocksbridge bypass, and the end of the upgraded section from the M1. At this point the road re-enters the borough of Barnsley, and the Sheffield-Barnsley boundary follows the southern edge of the road all the way to Langsett.

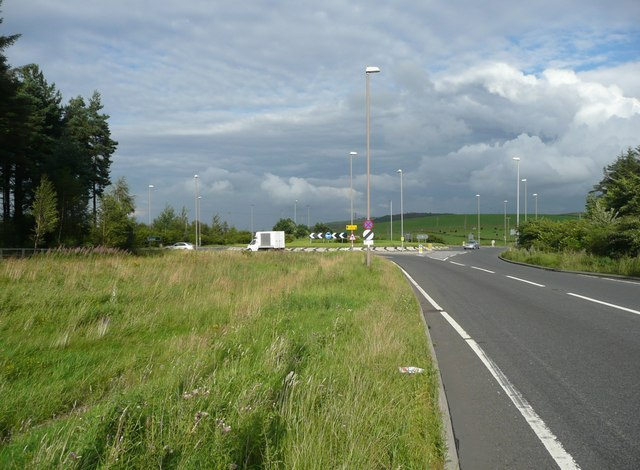
Flouch Roundabout with the A628, looking east

Underbank Reservoir is to the south, and Sheephouse Wood is to the north, with the entrance to Fox Wire on the right. At Midhopestones there is a crossroads, with the left turn for the Ye Olde Mustard Pot pub. The road follows the valley of the Little Don River, where it is followed by the Barnsley Boundary Walk. At Langsett there is a left turn for Upper Midhope, and a right turn, and passes the Bank View Cafe. To the south is Langsett Reservoir and the road skirts the eastern edge of Crookland Wood. It meets the A628 at the Flouch Roundabout. Traffic for Manchester from the M1 follows the A628 to the west – the Woodhead Pass. To the north, the road is untrunked all the way to Huddersfield, and passes the Flouch Hotel next to the former mini-roundabout with the A628.

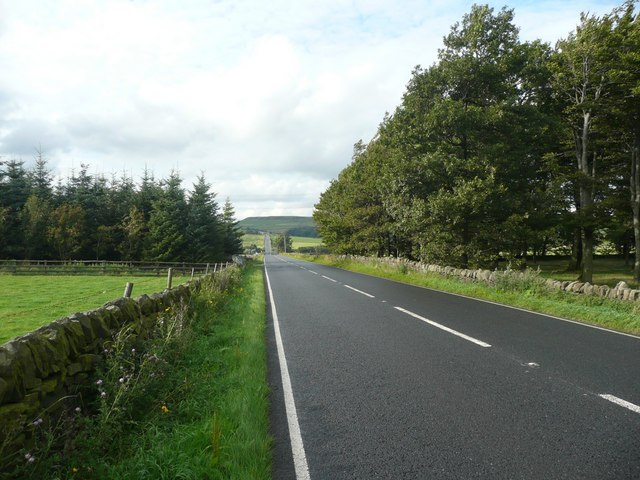
The A616 at Dunford is an exposed section.

It continues as the straight Whams Road across Thurlstone Moors, passing through Hazlehead, in Dunford, where it is crossed by the former Woodhead Line, next to the former Hazlehead Bridge railway station. The Woodhead Tunnel begins around two miles to the west at Dunford Bridge. The Woodhead Line is now the Trans Pennine Trail. From Langsett to the TPT bridge, the A616 is the boundary of the Peak District National Park. It crosses the River Don, and there are crossroads with the B6106. At Crow Edge, it passes the Hepworth pipe works, now owned by Wavin (a Dutch company), and the Prince of Wales Hotel on the right. At Victoria there are crossroads at the Victoria Inn, where the road enters Kirklees, and West Yorkshire. The road becomes more twisty, and passes through Hepworth and Scholes, where it is crossed by the Kirklees Way.

It crosses the A635 at New Mill. It passes through Thongsbridge and meets the Holme Valley at Brockholes as New Mill Road, and passes Brockholes railway station, and the Esso Midlothian Garage and the JET Johnsted Garage. There is a crossroads, with the left turn for Honley and the right turn for Honley railway station and Honley High School. It meets the A6024 from the left and as Huddersfield Road passes the Texaco Alpine Service Station, then becomes Woodhead Road. Entering Huddersfield, there is a crossroads with the left for Armitage Road (B6110 for Meltham) and the right for Berry Brow and its railway station. It passes under the Penistone Line and becomes Bridge Street, where it crosses the River Holme, meeting Meltham Road (B6108). As Lockwood Road it passes the Yorkshire Victoria', and meets St Thomas Road (B6432) then as Folly Hall crosses the River Colne, and meets Colne Road (B6432) from the right. As Chapel Hill it meets Manchester Road (A62) from the left, where it terminates on the A62 Huddersfield ring road.

== Stocksbridge bypass ==
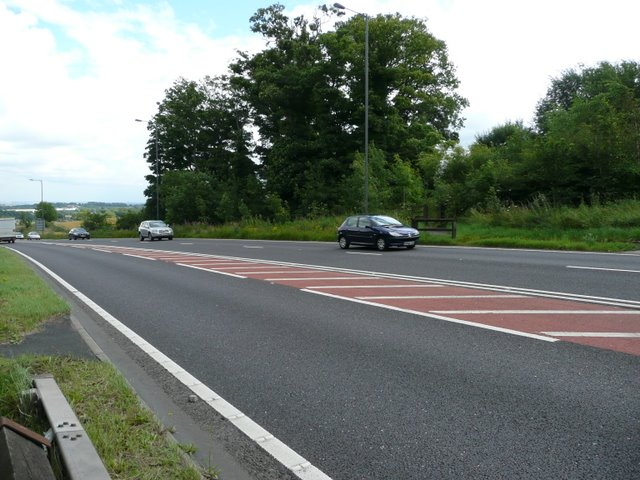
Uphill passing lane on the Stocksbridge bypass.

The bypass was opened on Friday 13 May 1988, by the Transport Secretary, and is a road that links the M1 motorway at Junction 35A (and J36) to the Woodhead Pass (one of the main trans-Pennine roads from Sheffield to Manchester) bypassing the towns of Stocksbridge and Deepcar. It has been said that the Stocksbridge bypass was originally planned to be part of the M67 motorway. It was built by Alfred McAlpine, and designed by Scott Wilson Group. The 7.5 mile section cost £18 million.

In early September 1987, two security guards from Constant Security Services of Cliffe Street, Mexborough encountered a monk figure above the Pearoyd Lane bridge. Two policemen, of South Yorkshire Police, visited the scene in their car two days later, and had a similar experience.

The road is notorious for having many accidents and has been labelled a 'blackspot'. While the South Yorkshire police question the statement and say the road is no more dangerous than any other road of its type in Britain, judges sentencing traffic accidents have declared the road to have been built "on the cheap" and the mayor of Stocksbridge at the time of its construction declared it to be "fearfully dangerous". During the road's construction it was downgraded from a dual carriageway with crash barrier to a single carriage way with a passing lane. Since its completion there has been a 46,000-name petition demanding it be upgraded to dual carriageway. There are frequent head-on collisions on the bypass.

Reports have suggested the road may appear to be safe at speeds above the 60 limit despite not being so. The speed limit on the A616 is enforced using a digital speed camera system called SPECS, which calculates the average speed of a vehicle over the distance travelled between two cameras using automatic number plate recognition (ANPR) technology. After the installation of the cameras, the proportion of people driving above the speed limit on the road dropped from 45% to 4% and only one person died between their installation in 2002 and 2005. This is compared with almost two a year before they were installed. This set of speed cameras is thought by locals not to be in current use, but nonetheless acts as a strong deterrent against speeding. Parts of the road have a double white line but at least two vehicles have been known to cross these leading to fatal crashes.

There are several ghost stories attached to the Stocksbridge Bypass, including reputed apparitions of a monk and phantom children during the road's construction. These claims were featured in a 1994 episode of the paranormal documentary series Strange but True?, hosted by Michael Aspel.
