= Kersall =

Hamlet and civil parish in Nottinghamshire, England

Coordinates: 53.151°N 0.933°W

- Hamlet and Civil parish
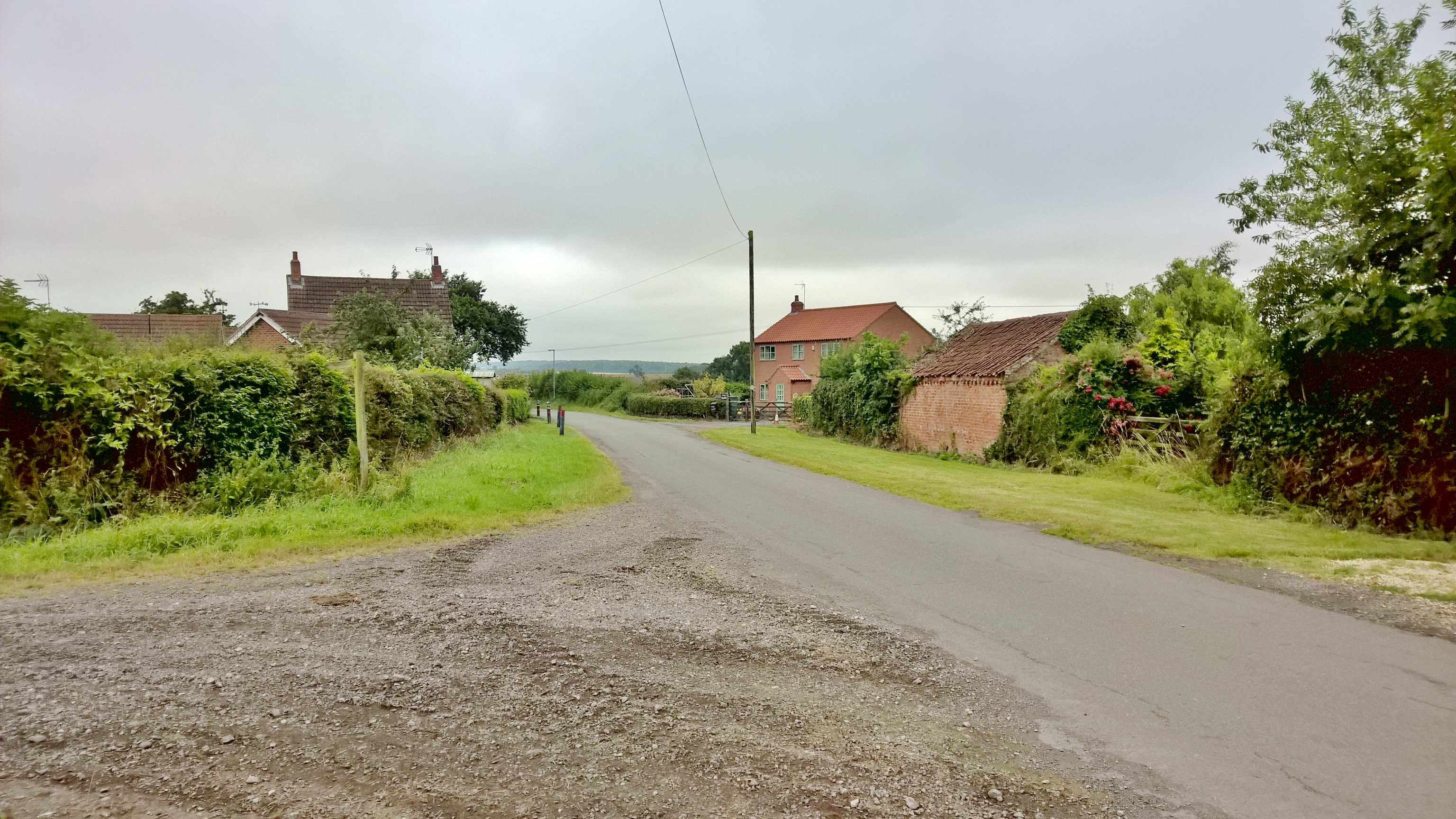
- Approaching Kersall

- Location within Nottinghamshire
- Interactive map of Kersall
- Area: 1.04 sq mi (2.7 km^{2})
- Population: 44 (2021)
  - Density: 42/sq mi (16/km^{2})
- OS grid reference: SK 71420 62117
  - London: 120 mi (190 km) SE
- District: Newark and Sherwood
- Shire county: Nottinghamshire
- Region: East Midlands
- Country: England
- Sovereign state: United Kingdom
- Post town: NEWARK
- Postcode district: NG22
- Dialling code: 01636
- Police: Nottinghamshire
- Fire: Nottinghamshire
- Ambulance: East Midlands
- UK Parliament: Newark
- Website: www.kkopc.org.uk

Kersall is a hamlet and civil parish within the Newark and Sherwood district of central Nottinghamshire, England.

== Geography ==
The area is 11 miles east of Mansfield, 7 miles north west of Newark-on-Trent and 16 miles north east of Nottingham.

It is bounded roughly between the A616 Sheffield-Ollerton-Newark road which passes briefly through the north of the parish, and the Caunton to Eakring road.

Kneesall bounds Kersall to the north, Maplebeck to the south, and Beesthorpe and Caunton to the south east.

Predominantly, the parish is a scattering of farms, farmhouses and cottages amongst a wider rural setting. These are grouped around roads meeting in the heart of the village by Kersall Lane and Wood Lane.

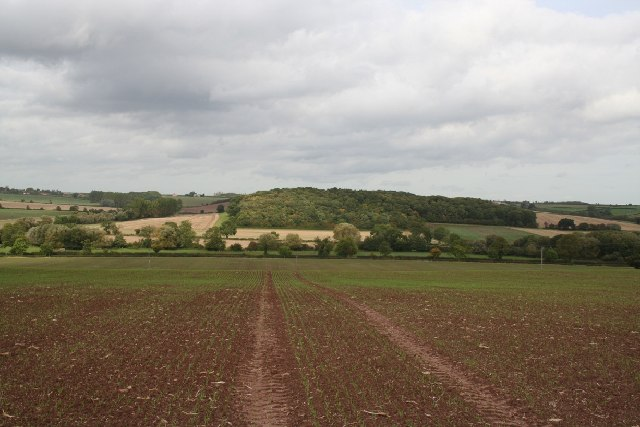
Hare Hill

The Beck stream forms the western and southern boundary of the parish with Maplebeck, before draining into the River Trent. The Eakring Meadows Nature Reserve run by the Nottinghamshire Wildlife Trust, straddles this by the western parish border and has SSSI status.

The area rises from the south towards the highest point of Hare Hill, at 85 metres (279 ft) along the north-western boundary, which is also the largest forested feature. Another treelined area is the Cocked Hat Plantation alongside the A616 road.

== Governance and demography ==
Although a standalone parish, a local parish council is formed with nearby Kneesall and Ompton.

For 2021 census purposes, Kersall's population is reported as totalling 44 people.

Newark and Sherwood district council administer the next layer of services, with Nottinghamshire County Council actioning the highest level of local public duties.

The village has a conservation area designation by the district council which restricts inappropriate development.

== History ==
=== Toponymy ===
The place name Kersall is possibly derived from 'Cynehere's nook of land'. If there was a person named Cynehere in local history is unclear. The nook of land can be a reference to a small valley, dry ground in marsh, the local stream lending weight to this reason. The nook can also mean a piece of land projecting from or detached from the main area of its administrative unit.

=== Legacy ===
Invariably known originally as Cheuersale.or Cheversale and eventually Kernesall and Kersal before its present spelling, it was mentioned in the Domesday Book as under the ownership of Gilbert of Ghent in AD 1086.

At the time of enclosure in 1778, Earl Manvers was being leased land, by the chapter of Southwell. The Duke of Newcastle was lord of the manor at this time. By 1853, Kersall was recorded as under Kneesall parish, with Earl Manvers as Lord of the manor due to the extensive land ownership. The Manvers Pierrepont family sold much of their holdings in the middle and later 20th century.

There was a windmill in the village until 1840 when it was blown down during a storm.

There was also a small Methodist chapel which has been unused as such in recent times.

== Community ==
Farming is the key industry with much of the available land and buildings used to support this activity.

Kersall Lodge Farmhouse on the A616 road is the only listed building in the parish, with a Grade II designation. It was built in the late 18th century.

Kersall was briefly in the news in 1981 because of its telephone box, which was the subject of a preservation campaign.
