= Perlethorpe cum Budby =

Civil parish in Newark and Sherwood, Nottinghamshire, England

Coordinates: 53.228°N 1.0514°W

- Civil parish
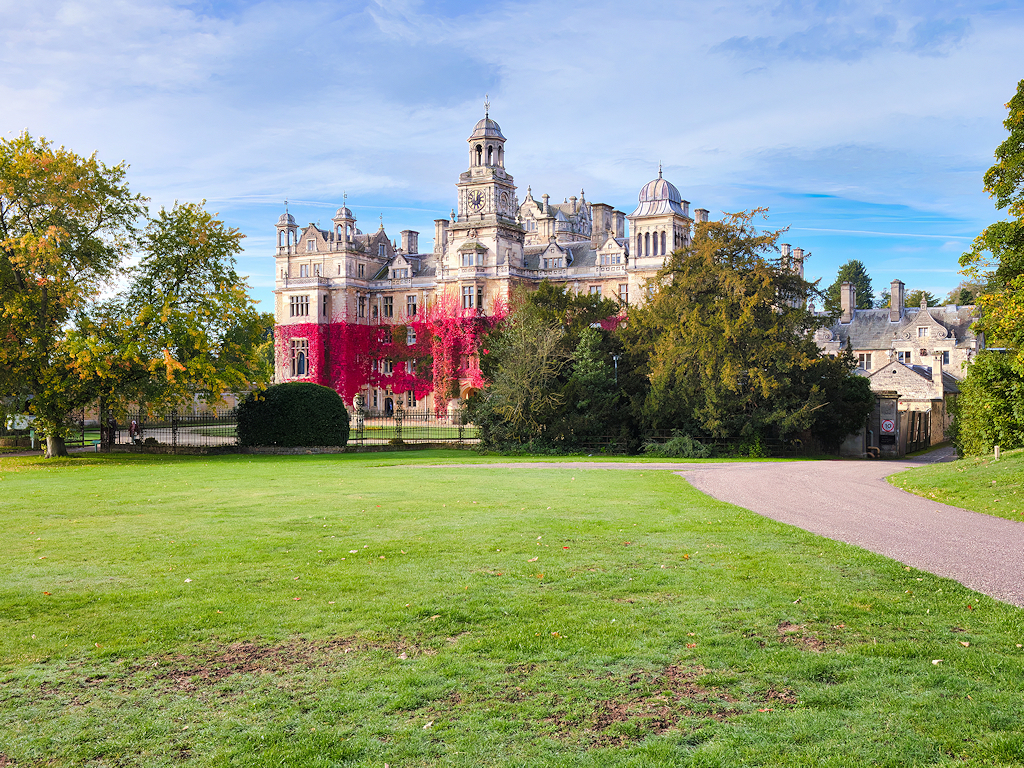
- Thoresby Hall

- Location within Nottinghamshire
- Interactive map of Perlethorpe cum Budby
- Area: 8.64 sq mi (22.4 km^{2})
- Population: 172 (2021)
  - Density: 20/sq mi (7.7/km^{2})
- OS grid reference: SK 634706
  - London: 125 mi (201 km) S
- District: Newark and Sherwood
- Shire county: Nottinghamshire
- Region: East Midlands
- Country: England
- Sovereign state: United Kingdom
- Settlements: Perlethorpe: Budby
- Post town: NEWARK
- Postcode district: NG22
- Dialling code: 01623
- Police: Nottinghamshire
- Fire: Nottinghamshire
- Ambulance: East Midlands
- UK Parliament: Sherwood

Perlethorpe cum Budby is a civil parish in the Newark and Sherwood district, within the county of Nottinghamshire, England. The overall area had a population of 172 at the 2021 census. The parish lies in the north west of the county and district. It is 125 mi (201 km) north of London, 8 mi (13 km) north east of Mansfield and 20 mi (32 km) north of the city of Nottingham. The parish and wider area is at the heart of Sherwood Forest, which is associated with the Robin Hood legend. Thoresby Hall, which is a notable ducal country house and estate is also within the boundaries of the parish.

== Geography ==
=== Settlements ===
The parish consists of two settlements all on the Thoresby Estate:

- Perlethorpe
- Budby

==== Perlethorpe ====
Perlethorpe is based in the eastern portion of the parish, lying just to the left of the A614 Blyth to Ollerton road. It was an estate village for workers at Thoresby Hall clustered around a square layout of roads, with a notable church and estate hall.

==== Budby ====
This is 2 miles south west of Perlethorpe. It is a hamlet lying alongside the A616 Newark-Ollerton-Barlborough Road. It too was an estate village associated to Thoresby Hall, and notable for its pink houses used in the limewash used to paint their exteriors.

=== Thoresby Hall ===
The Grade I hall is now a commercial country hotel, but was once the seat of the Pierrepont & Manvers families until the latter part of the 20th century. The estate through a trust still maintain nearby amenities such as the nearby courtyard, stables, parkland and forestry.

=== Landscape ===
The area of the parish is traditionally part of Sherwood Forest, and it still maintains much forested land, notably the historical Bilhaugh and Birklands forests in the south. Budby North and South Forests take up the west portion of the parish. Thoresby Park with some landscaped areas and farmland take up the central portion, with the southern reaches of Clumber Park in the north.

Predominantly, many of the parish residents are clustered around the villages. Outside of these is a scattering of farms, farmhouses and cottages amongst the wider rural forested setting.

The Robin Hood Way long distance path runs along the western and eastern boundaries of the parish.

==== Water features ====
Two watercourses run through the area:

- River Meden which splits off within the area to the tributary:
- Riven Maun

The Thoresby Lake near the hall was created by damming the Meden.

==== Land elevation ====
The parish is relatively low-lying. The land height varies from 35 metres (115 ft) by the River Meden meeting the north eastern parish boundary, to 95 metres (312 ft) in the south west area by Hanger Hill.

== Facilities ==
The Thoresby Estate is a family trust who maintain ownership of all the land and facilities within the parish. They manage several locations such as:

- The Thoresby Hall courtyard, which maintains craft shops and a gallery.
- Sherwood Hideway, which is an old World War II army camp converted into a local holiday village, consisting of several lodges hired out for short breaks. There is access to various local activities and amenities.
- A solar farm is based in the Budby North Forest, along with other local environmental schemes and initiatives.

== See also ==
- Listed buildings in Perlethorpe cum Budby
