= Perlethorpe =

Village in Nottinghamshire, England

Coordinates: 53.233°N 1.028°W

- Village
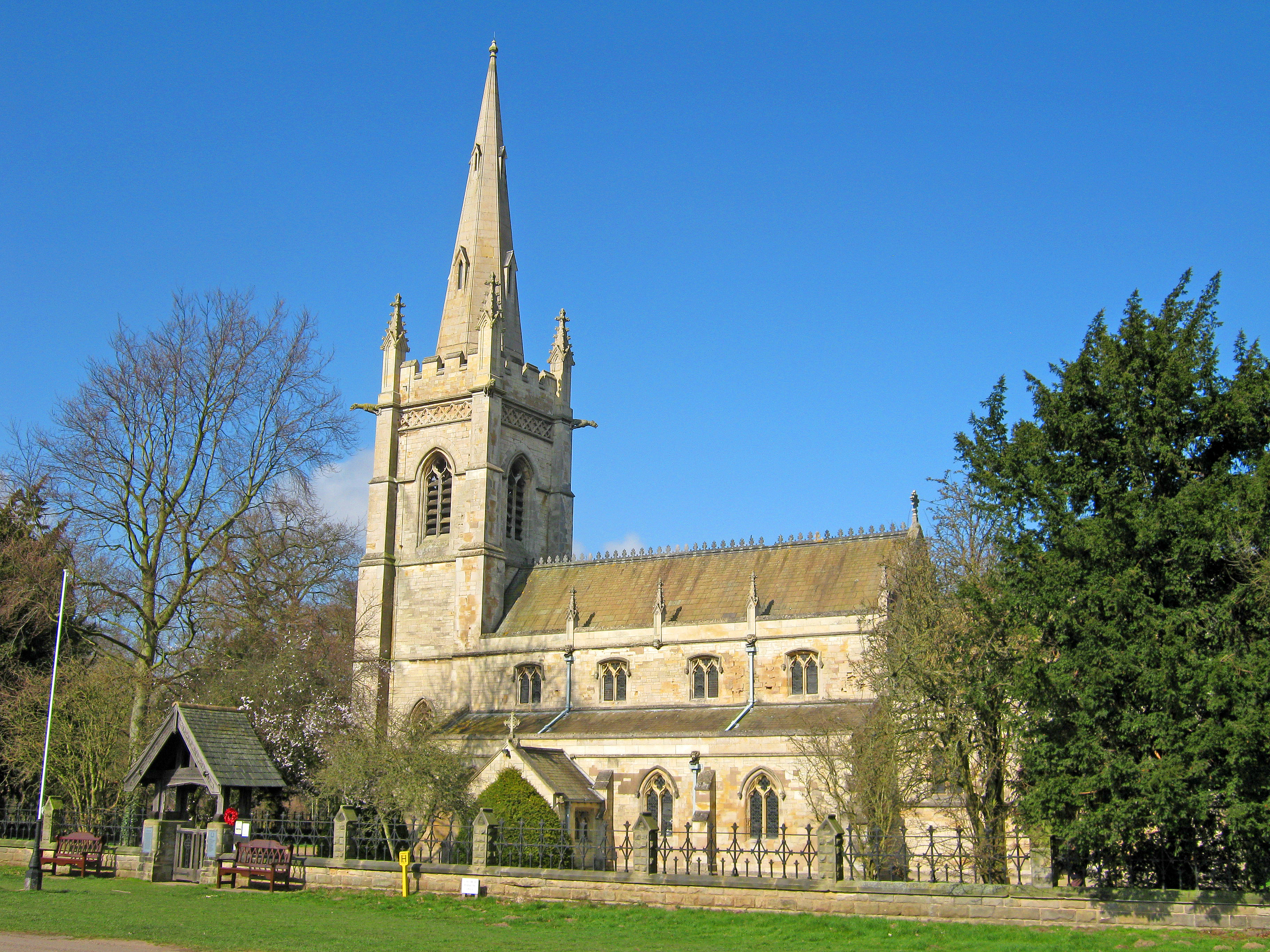
- St John’s Church, Perlethorpe.

- Location within Nottinghamshire
- OS grid reference: SK648711
- Civil parish: Perlethorpe cum Budby
- District: Newark and Sherwood
- Shire county: Nottinghamshire
- Region: East Midlands
- Country: England
- Sovereign state: United Kingdom
- Post town: NEWARK
- Postcode district: NG22
- Dialling code: 01623
- Police: Nottinghamshire
- Fire: Nottinghamshire
- Ambulance: East Midlands
- UK Parliament: Sherwood

Perlethorpe is a small estate village and former civil parish, now in the parish of Perlethorpe cum Budby, in the Newark and Sherwood district, in the county of Nottinghamshire, England. Nearby is Thoresby Hall, the former home of the Earl Manvers and the village remains entirely owned by the Thoresby Estate. In 1891 the parish had a population of 139.

== Etymology ==
Perlethorpe is from Old Norse thorp/þrop "village", a place-name element common in Nottinghamshire, and nearby Lincolnshire. The first element of the name, perle is unknown, and toponymists can only speculate as to its origin. However, there are three particularly popular suggestions. The first is "rush of water" from the Old English and Middle English perle. The second is that it's a deviation from the possible original name Palethorpe, pale meaning "area enclosed by a boundary". Lastly it may have been a deviation from Peverelthorpe as William Peverel was a powerful landowner in the area during the reign of Henry II.

== Geography and history ==
The village itself is located about a quarter of a mile west of the A614, about half a mile north of Ollerton and 10 miles north east of Mansfield. The River Meden runs nearby. The village contains a large green, a village hall, the Estate Office for Thoresby Estate and a large church (of Saint John the Evangelist). There was once a primary school in the village but that has since been closed down and the building used as an Environmental Education Centre to teach children from many schools about the countryside.

Although the village has a much longer history, the oldest buildings which now remain date back only as far as the late of the 18th century. The church of Saint John was built in 1876 and became the parish church in 1877. The half-timbered Almshouses near the church were built by Walter Owen Hickson c. 1890. Perhaps the most striking buildings are the "Redbrick" buildings, dating from the 1950s which are found clustered around the village green. These, like many of the older dwellings, were used exclusively for workers at Thoresby Hall when they were first built. Roman coins were found in the village in the 2000s. The parish records date from 1529, some 10 years before it became law for them to be kept, making them some of the oldest in the country.

Perlethorpe was formerly a township and chapelry in the parish of Edwinstowe, from 1866 Perlethorpe was a civil parish in its own right, on 1 October 1899 the parish was abolished to form Perlethorpe cum Budby.

== See also ==
- Listed buildings in Perlethorpe cum Budby
