= Snowsill =

Snowsill is a rare and unusual surname which has nothing whatever to do with "snow". It is in fact Old English locational and derives from the parish of Kneesall, near Ollerton in Nottinghamshire, England. Notable people with the surname include:

- Elinor Snowsill (born 1989), Welsh rugby player
- Emma Snowsill (born 1981), Australian triathlete
