= Budby =

Hamlet in Nottinghamshire, England

Coordinates: 53.224°N 1.075°W

- Hamlet
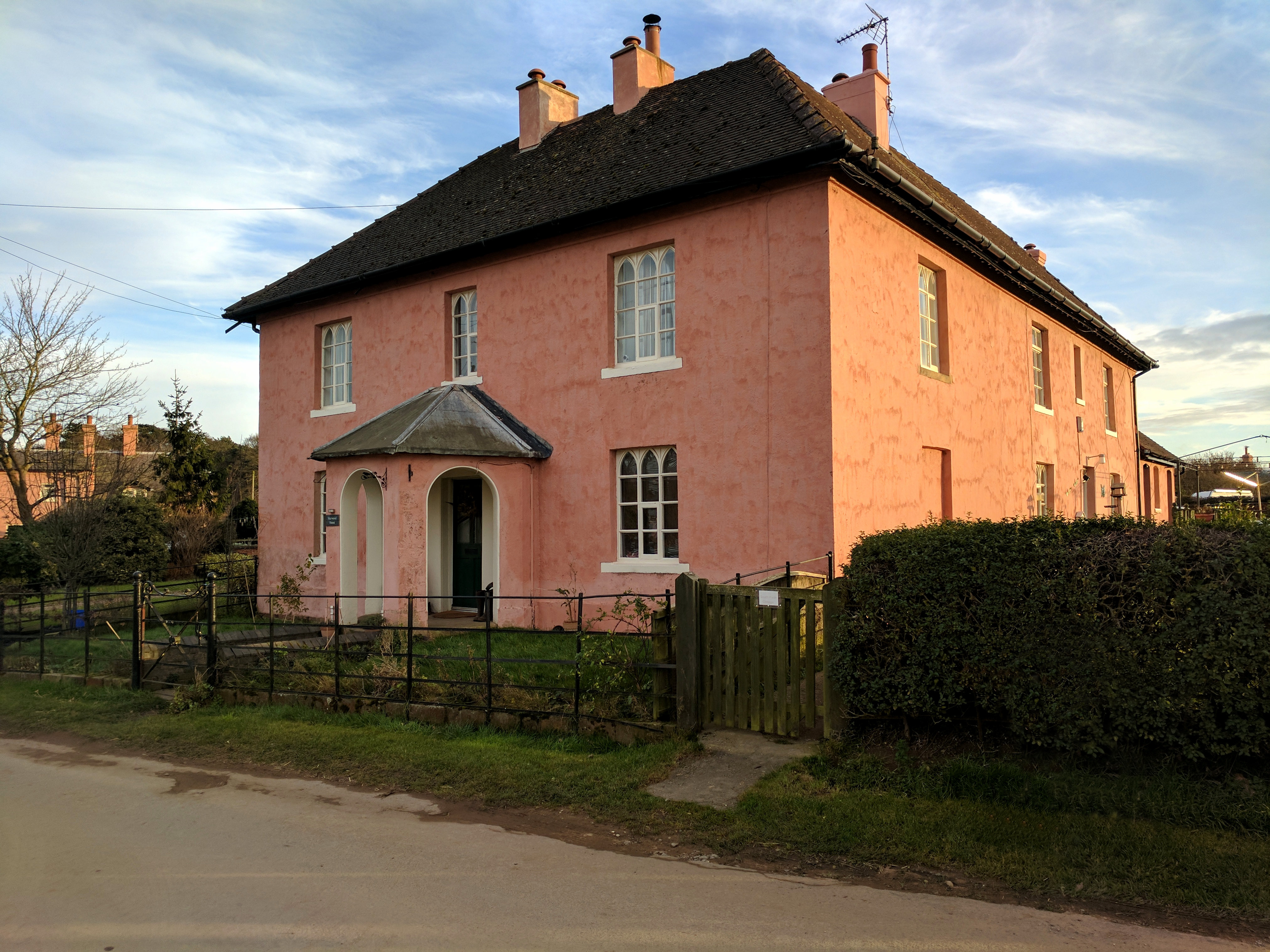
- Sherwood House

- Location within Nottinghamshire
- Civil parish: Perlethorpe cum Budby
- District: Newark and Sherwood
- Shire county: Nottinghamshire
- Region: East Midlands
- Country: England
- Sovereign state: United Kingdom
- Post town: Newark
- Postcode district: NG22
- Police: Nottinghamshire
- Fire: Nottinghamshire
- Ambulance: East Midlands
- UK Parliament: Sherwood

Budby is a hamlet and former civil parish, now in the parish of Perlethorpe cum Budby, in the Newark and Sherwood district, in the county of Nottinghamshire, England. Budby is about 2 miles (3 km) north of Edwinstowe. Nearby is Thoresby Hall, the former home of the Earl Manvers, which is now a hotel however the village, remains wholly owned by the Thoresby Estate. In 1891 the parish had a population of 121.

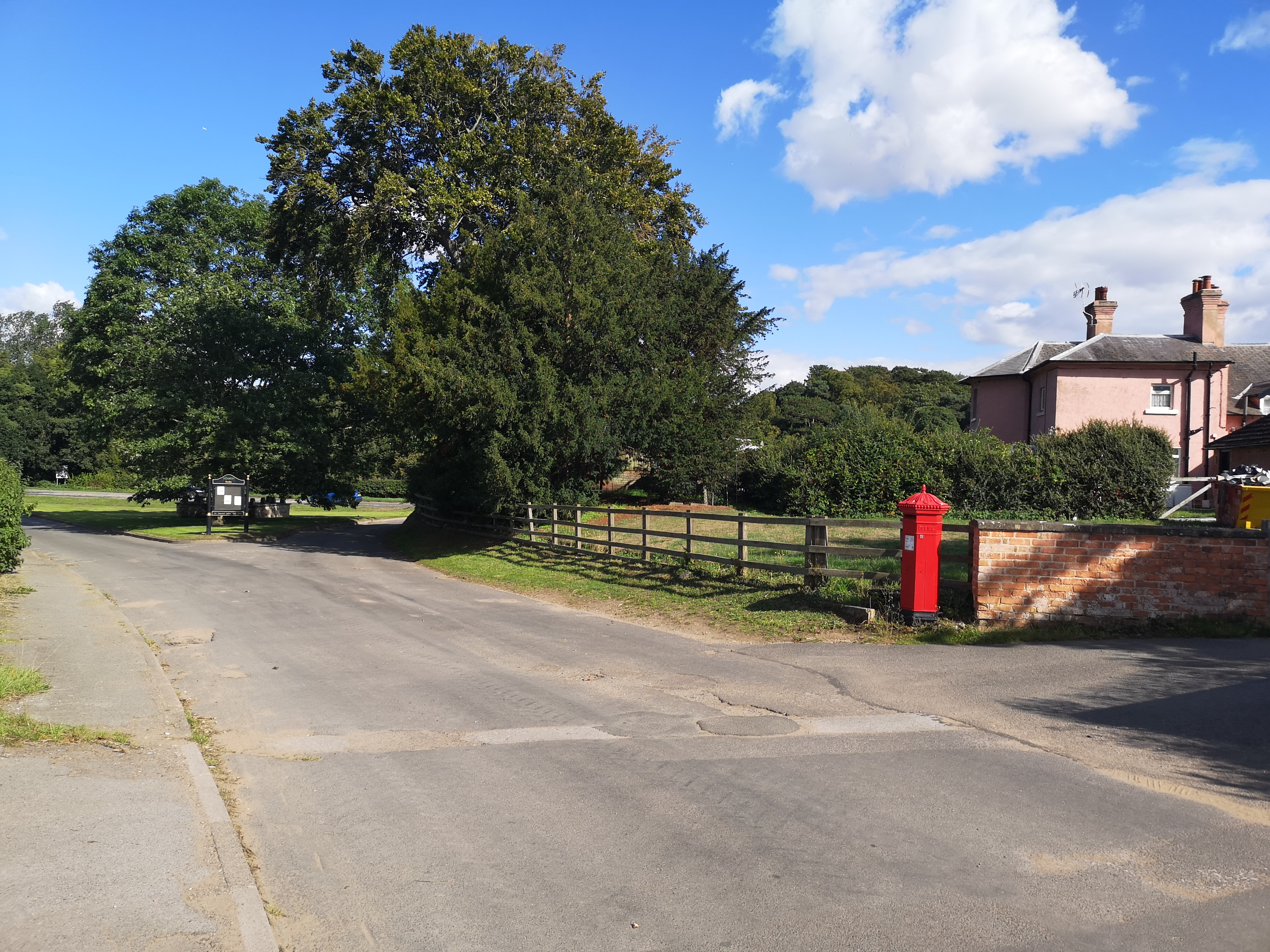
Penfold-type post box in Budby

== Geography and history ==
The hamlet itself is by the A616 road and the River Meden.

Budby was mentioned in Domesday Book in 1086 with the land being owned by King William the Conqueror. The area of Sherwood Forest was a Royal Forest used for hunting by the kings.

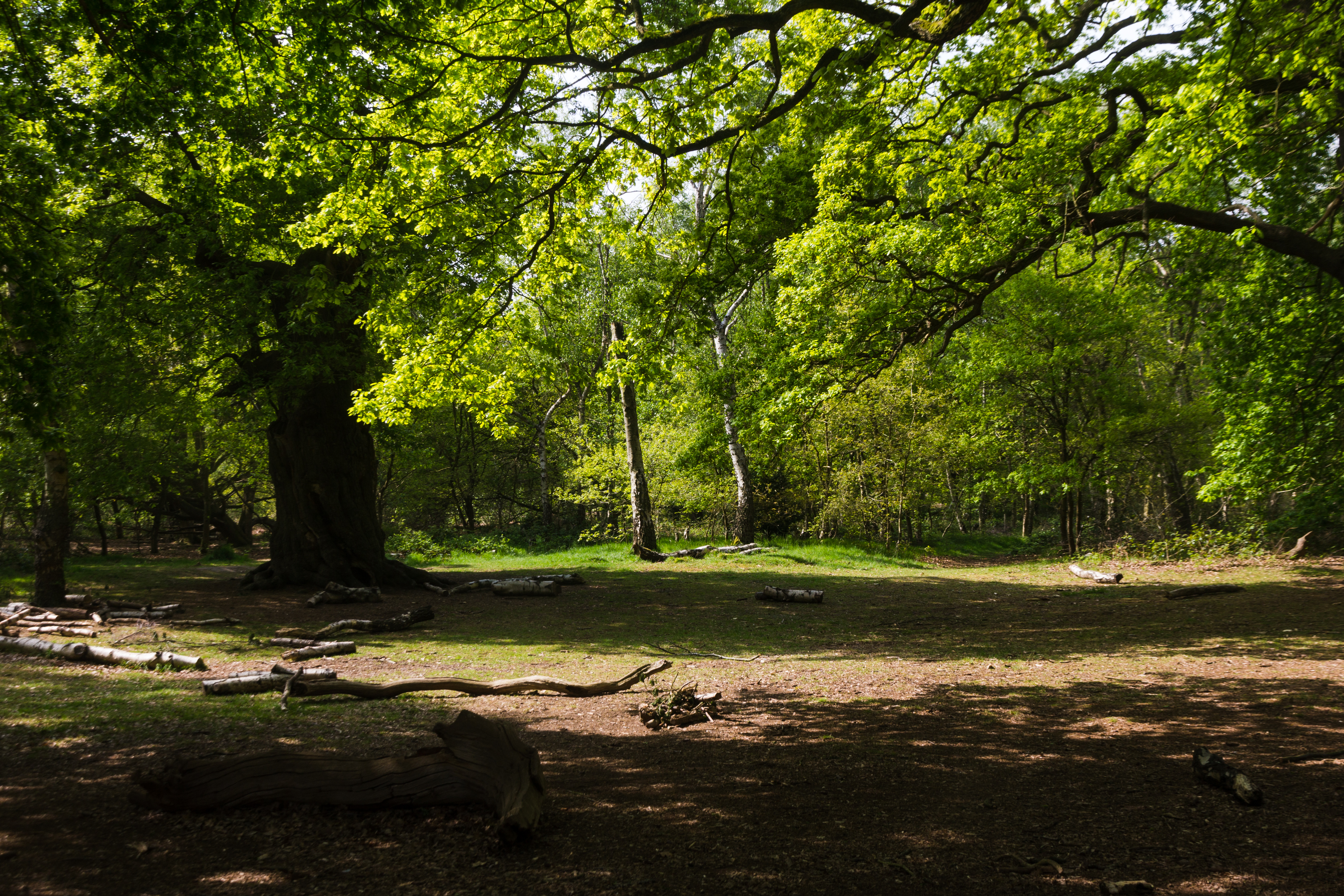
Sherwood Forest

In 1662, Budby was part of Sherwood Forest though most of the forest has since been cleared for agriculture. It consists of two farms and 23 cottages built for estate workers many of which are still used by employees or tenants of the Estate.

Budby has a mid-Victorian Penfold-type post box.

Budby was formerly a township in the parish of Edwinstowe, from 1866 Budby was a civil parish in its own right, on 1 October 1899 the parish was abolished to form Perlethorpe cum Budby.

Royal Society for the Protection of Birds south forest nature reserve is located nearby in Sherwood Forest.

== See also ==
- Listed buildings in Perlethorpe cum Budby
