= A632 road =

Major road in Derbyshire and Nottinghamshire, England

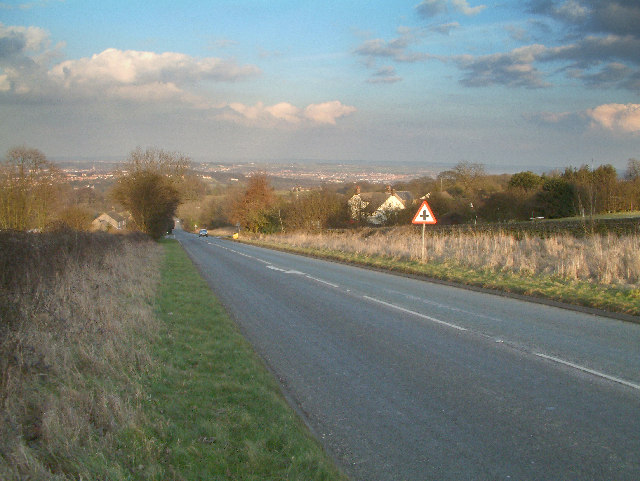
View looking downhill towards Slatepit Dale and with Chesterfield visible in the distance.

The A632 is a major road in Derbyshire and Nottinghamshire, England. It starts in Matlock (53.1347°N 1.5485°W) and joins the town with Chesterfield. From there, it goes through Bolsover and then onto the A616 at the village of Cuckney (53.2336°N 1.1543°W).
