= Thomas Wright (mathematical instrument maker) =

British mathematical instrument maker

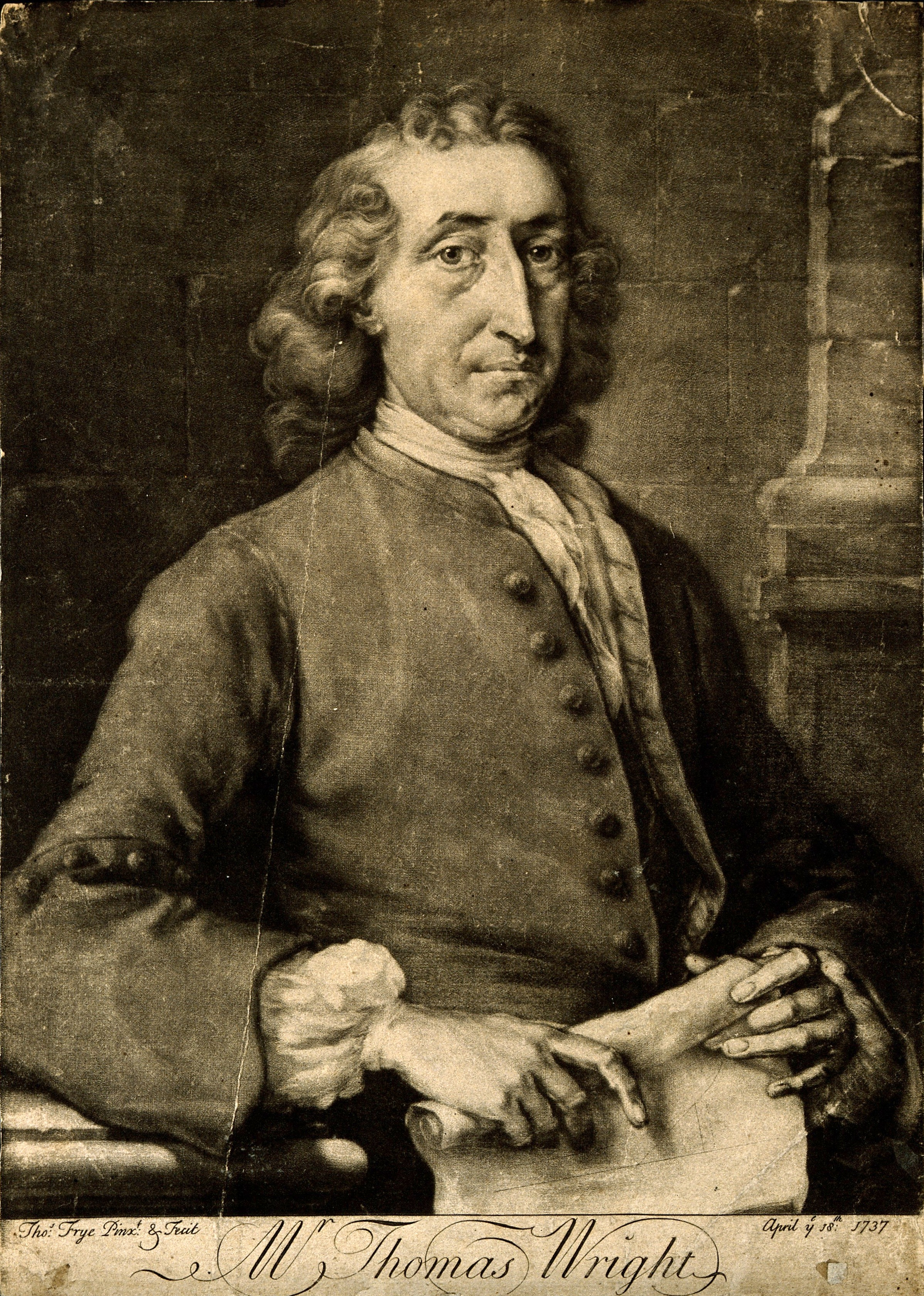
Mezzotint of “Mr. Thomas Wright” by Thomas Frye, 1737

Thomas Wright (1693-1767) was a British mathematical instrument maker working in London in the early 18th century. He was appointed "Mathematical Instrument Maker" to the Prince of Wales from 1718 (later King George II on this succession to the throne in 1727).

== Early life ==
Thomas Wright was born c. 1693 in Southwark, London, the son of William Wright, a clockmaker. He was apprenticed to John Rowley in the Company of Broderers, who was Master of Mechanics to George I. Wright continued to work for him after being made free in 1715 and he took over the business in 1728 on Rowley's death.

== Career ==
Wright's premises were at “the sign of the Orrery and Globe”, near Salisbury Court, Fleet Street, London, the same address as his Master, John Rowley, who had made a very early orrery to the design of the clockmaker George Graham, who lived above the shop.

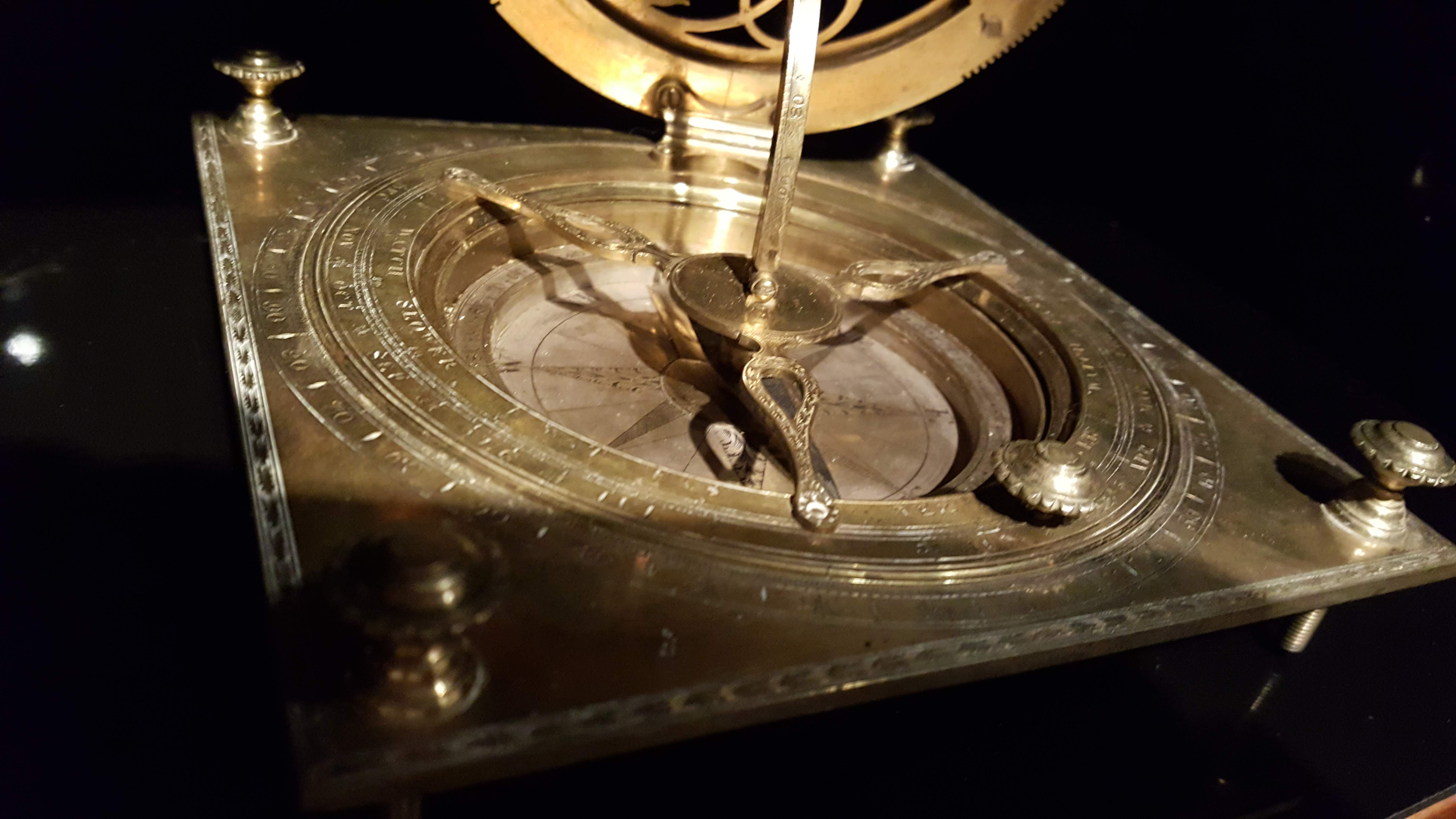
Portable sundial by Thomas Wright

Thomas Wright made many types of instruments - for example, amongst the instruments signed by him at the History of Science Museum, Oxford there is an orrery, a theodolite, a waywiser, a drainage level and several portable sundials. Royal Museums Greenwich has a horizontal sundial, circumferentor (surveyor's compass) as well as a drawing set in its collection. The collection in the Science Museum, London includes a planetary model, horary quadrant, callipers, and a flexible drawing curve and he was credited with expanding the Grand Orrery at the Science Museum to include Saturn. A fine mechanical equinoctial dial is in the collection of the Metropolitan Museum of Art, New York.

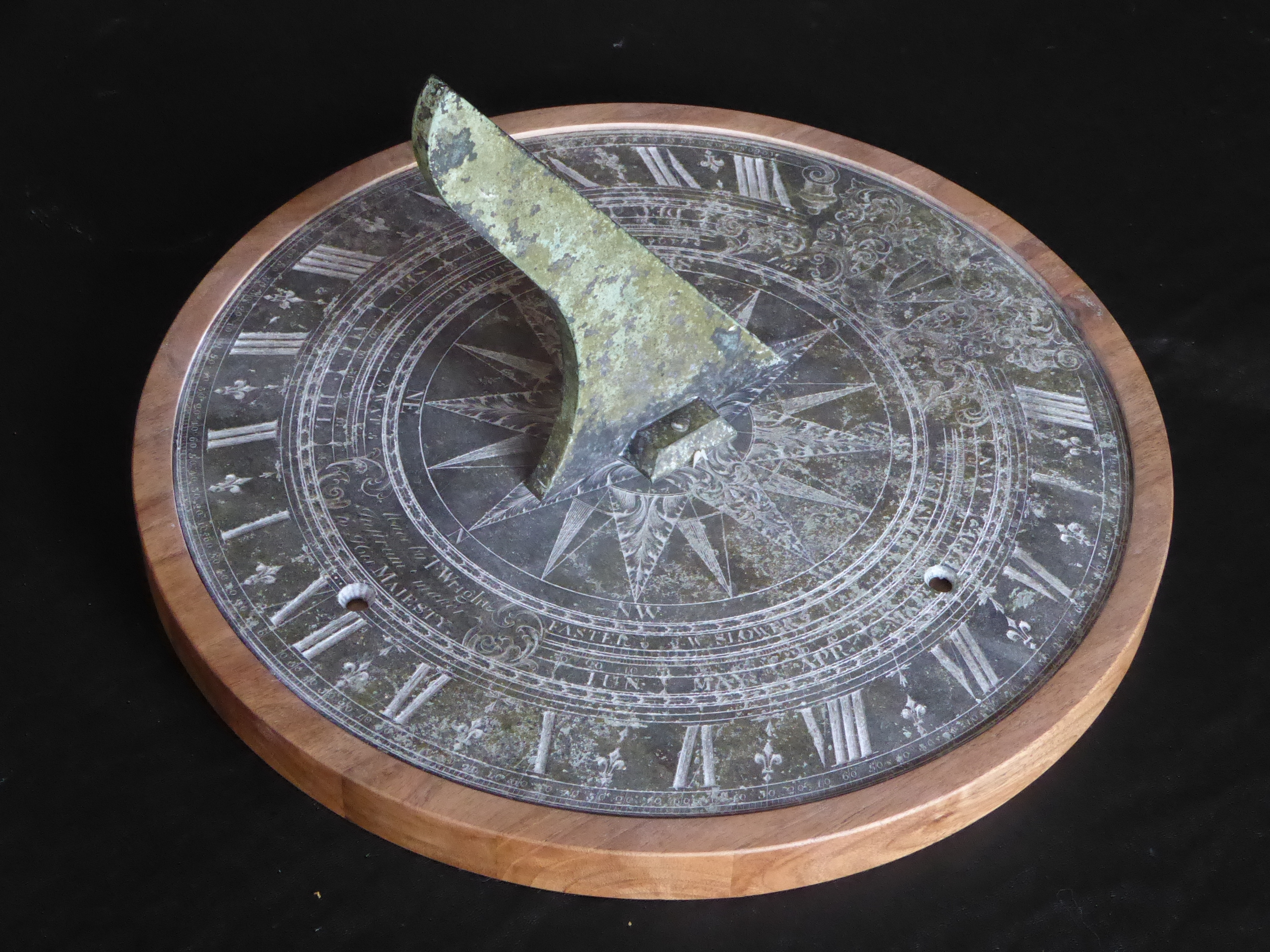
A horizontal sundial by Thomas Wright c1730

The British Sundial Society maintains a list of extant horizontal sundials signed by Wright. These were documented in the Society's Bulletin in 2004, when 9 were described and updated in 2022 with the list expanded to 27 dials.

In 1731 Thomas Wright and Richard Cushee printed a book by Joseph Harris titled "The Description and Use of the Globes, and the Orrery: To Which Is Prefixed, By Way Of Introduction, A Brief Account Of The Solar System" which includes a lengthy description of an orrery and an advertisement: "The great encouragement Mr. Wright has had for many years past in making large Orreries, with the motions of all the Planets and Satellites, and the true motion of Saturn’s Ring, has made him so ready and perfect, that Gentlemen may depend on having them made reasonable and sound, not liable to be out of Order."

== Attribution ==
Thomas Wright is a common name and he can be confused with several other instrument makers with the same name, most commonly Thomas Wright (astronomer) of Durham, England. It is not uncommon to find works by Thomas Wright (instrument maker) to be incorrectly attributed to Thomas Wright (astronomer), who was also briefly involved with instrument making whilst in London as a 19 year old. The mezzotint of “Mr. Thomas Wright” signed Thomas Frye and dated 1737 showing "a mature man in his fifties" is sometimes described as showing Thomas Wright the astronomer.

== Retirement and death ==
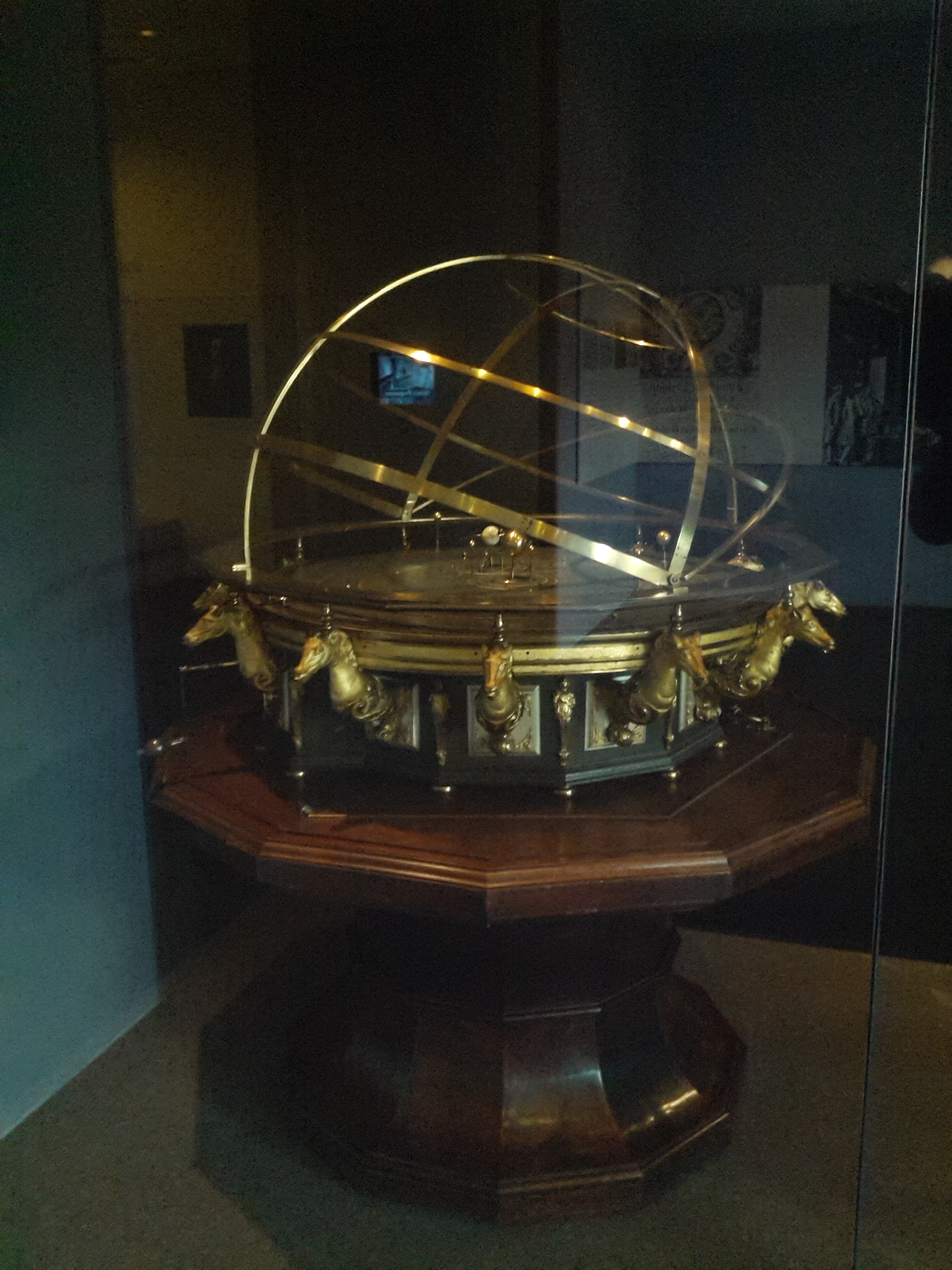
Orrery by Thomas Wright

Wright died in 1767. His will describes him as “Citizen and Embroiderer of London, and by trade a Mathematical Instrument Maker” and was written on 14 May 1763 and proved on 19 June 1767. It mentions his wife Susanna but no children. Since he retired in 1747/8, this would indicate a lengthy 20-year period of retirement, unusual in the 18th century.
