= Ompton =

Hamlet and civil parish in Nottinghamshire, England

Coordinates: 53.18°N 0.97°W

- Hamlet and civil parish
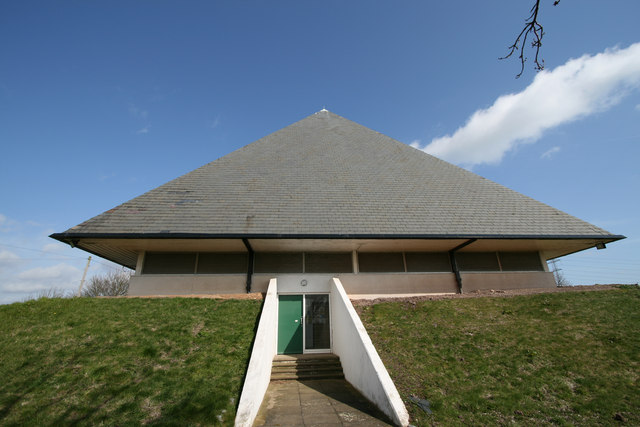
- Ompton Pumping Station

- Location within Nottinghamshire
- Interactive map of Ompton
- Area: 0.95 sq mi (2.5 km^{2})
- Population: 52 (2021)
  - Density: 55/sq mi (21/km^{2})
- OS grid reference: SK 688651
  - London: 120 mi (190 km) SSE
- District: Newark and Sherwood
- Shire county: Nottinghamshire
- Region: East Midlands
- Country: England
- Sovereign state: United Kingdom
- Post town: RETFORD
- Postcode district: NG22
- Dialling code: 01623
- Police: Nottinghamshire
- Fire: Nottinghamshire
- Ambulance: East Midlands
- UK Parliament: Newark

Ompton is a hamlet in Nottinghamshire, England, three miles south-east of Ollerton. It is in the civil parish of Ompton. The population count was 52 at the 2021 census. Kneesall lies to the southwest, and Wellow to the north west. It has a red-brick chapel of 1860. About half a mile to the west is a water pumping station, built 1965–1968 as a tiled pyramid on a glazed plinth.
