= River Meden =

River in Nottinghamshire, England

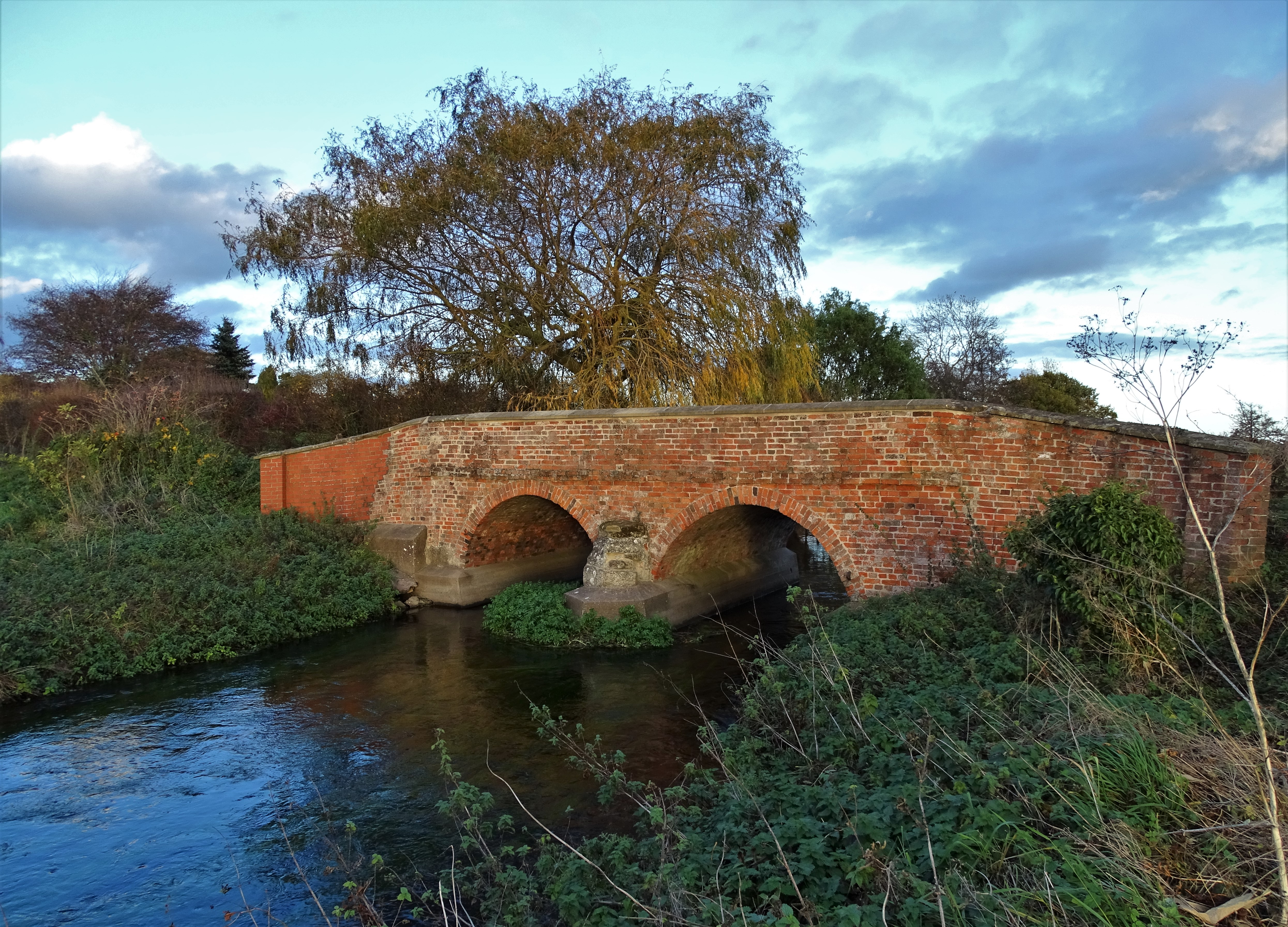
- The river at Bothamsall.

Location
- Country: England
- County: Nottinghamshire

Physical characteristics
- Source
  - location: Huthwaite
- Mouth: River Idle
  - location: Markham Moor
  - coordinates: 53°16′6″N 0°56′52″W

Basin features
- Tributaries
  - left: Sookholme Brook
  - right: The Bottoms

The River Meden is a river in Nottinghamshire, England. Its source lies just north of Huthwaite, near the Derbyshire border, and from there it flows north east through Pleasley and Warsop before merging temporarily with the River Maun near Bothamsall. The rivers divide after a short distance and go on separately to a point near Markham Moor where they once more combine to form the River Idle.

The river was a source of water power for mills in Pleasley Vale from the 1760s until the 1980s. Three huge cotton mills and their associated mill ponds still dominate the Vale. The buildings were bought by Bolsover District Council in 1992, and have become a centre for light industry. On a much smaller scale was the water mill at Warsop, which still retains much of its internal machinery.

== Route ==
The river rises as two main streams to the north of Huthwaite, above the 200-foot (61 m) contour, on the coal measures that run along the western edge of Nottinghamshire. Both are crossed by dismantled railway lines, before they unite and flow in a north-easterly direction to the north of Stanton Hill and Skegby. After crossings by two more redundant railways, the river is joined by a stream which flows from the Car Ponds on the edge of the Hardwick Hall estate. The county boundary between Nottinghamshire and Derbyshire follows the course of the stream, and continues along the river as it passes to the south of Pleasley and under the A617 road. Just before the bridge are two large ponds, the second one constrained by a grade II listed dam, 66 feet (20 m) long by 10 feet (3.0 m) wide, with vertical wooded sluice gates on the upstream side. The adjacent two-arched bridge was built in 1800, although it was modified somewhat in the twentieth century, and its function has been partially superseded by the A617 bypass. Next the river passes through Pleasley Vale, where the water has cut through the underlying limestone escarpment to form a deep, narrow valley, much of which is wooded. Several mill buildings were constructed here out of local limestone. Two large mill ponds remain, with two mill buildings, while a third building is located on a stream which flows from the north to join the Meden at this point.

After passing under the Robin Hood Line, which runs from Worksop to Nottingham, the county border leaves the river, which continues in a north-easterly direction. Beyond the B6407 Sookholme Road bridge, it is joined by The Bottoms, which rises in Mansfield Woodhouse and flows northwards to the junction. The freight line to Shirebrook crosses the river, and also crosses Sookholme Brook, which has two sources near Shirebrook, and after they have joined, flows parallel to the Meden to its junction near Warsop Vale. The river passes between Church Warsop and Market Warsop, where it is crossed by the A60 road. Just below the bridge is Warsop watermill, much of which dates from 1767. The building is grade II listed, and internally, the machinery and rolling mill date from the nineteenth century. There is also an early twentieth century water turbine. The mill bridge and weir are also listed structures. Turning eastwards, the river passes through Budby and into Thoresby Park, where it has been dammed to form a large ornamental lake called Thoresby Lake. The difference in height between the lake and the river below it at the eastern end was sufficient for Earl Manvers, the owner of Thoresby Hall, to install two water turbines in 1941. They were supplied by Newtons of Derby and were of 22 kVA and 5 kVA capacity. The electricity generated supplied the hall. The generator house was demolished in the late 20th century. Below the lake, the river passes the hamlet of Perlethorpe, to be joined by the River Maun, flowing northwards, and here called Whitewater. The Robin Hood Way, a long-distance footpath, crosses soon afterwards, and a weir creates two channels again, the south one deemed to be the Maun and the north one the Meden. They remain roughly parallel as they are crossed by the B6387 road near Bothamsall, a freight railway and the Robin Hood Way again. They diverge to the west of Markham Moor roundabout on the A1 road, pass under the road, and combine to form the River Idle. Just below the junction, the River Poulter swells the flow.

== Mills ==
The river near Pleasley Vale has been utilised to provide power since at least 1767, when two forges and a corn mill are known to have been operating. The forges were run by George Sitwell, and were called Nether and Upper forge. The engineered river channel made it a good site for further development, and a consortium of businessmen from Nottingham and drapers from Mansfield leased the vale and Pleasley Park in 1782, in order to construct water-powered cotton mills. The Upper Mill (now called Mill 1) was built first, on the site of the previous corn mill, and was operational by 1785. The Lower Mill (now Mill 3) was completed seven years later at a cost of £1,190, and was much bigger. A manager's house and a row of ten houses for the workers were also completed in 1792. The mills supplied cotton to the expanding East Midland hosiery industry. One of the original three businessmen was Henry Hollins, and by the early 18th century, the mills were run by William Hollins and Co. They were the first and one of the most successful cotton producers in the East Midlands.

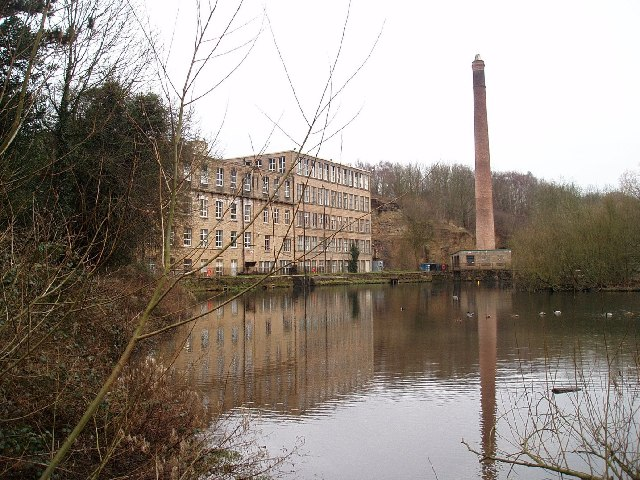
The Upper Mill (now Mill 1) at Pleasley Vale, with the mill pond in the foreground

The Hollins family managed the mills for many years, but from the 1830s were joined by the Pagets, who introduced steam power to the mills. Fire destroyed the Upper Mill on 25 December 1840, but it was rebuilt by 1844. The Lower Mill also burnt down, and was replaced in 1847. Newer equipment fitted as part of the rebuilding enabled the mills to stay competitive. William Hollins lived at Pleasley Vale, and oversaw the expansion of the community, with the construction of more houses for the workers, the provision of public facilities including a school, wash house, and a cooperative society, and attention to leisure activities by the establishing of a Mechanics Institute, a library and a cricket club. A company farm was also established. St Chad's Chapel and the vicarage were commissioned by Charles Paget in 1876. The chapel was opened in 1881, but was reputedly built in 1861 at Stuffynwood, Derbyshire, and later moved to its present site. It has a small bell turret at its western end, and a number of its features mimic thirteenth and fourteenth century styles. Internally, there is a brass memorial to Paget and his wife Helen Elizabeth.

From the 1890s, the mills produced Viyella, a mixture of cotton with Merino wool, which produces a soft fabric. They continued to flourish, as various extensions show. The Upper Mill was extended in the 1890s, when a fourth storey was added, and again, probably in 1913, when extensions were added to the north and rear. A large combing shed, where cotton fibres were straightened and aligned prior to the production of fabric, was built just below it in 1913. This was a two-storey building, with a single storey wing at the back. It was extended in 1952, when an extra two floors were added to the main shed, and a three-storey block was added at the side. At this point, it became a mill, and is now called Mill 2. The Lower Mill was also extended, but because it was much larger than the Upper Mill when it was built, and the extensions were relatively small, it retains more of its original character. There were 980 workers employed at the site in 1934, but decline gradually set in. The first workers houses were demolished in 1961, to be followed by the school, the baths and the Mechanics Institute. By 1987, production had moved abroad, and the mills closed. Bolsover District Council bought the mill buildings in 1992, using compulsory purchase powers, and they have been revitalised, to be used for light industry and offices. The mill ponds have also survived.

== Water quality ==
The Environment Agency measures water quality of the river systems in England. Each is given an overall ecological status, which may be one of five levels: high, good, moderate, poor and bad. There are several components that are used to determine this, including biological status, which looks at the quantity and varieties of invertebrates, angiosperms and fish. Chemical status, which compares the concentrations of various chemicals against known safe concentrations, is rated good or fail.

The water quality of the Meden and its tributaries was as follows in 2019.

Section	Ecological Status	Chemical Status	Length	Catchment
Meden from Source to Sookholme Brook	Good	Fail	14.8 miles (23.8 km)	20.25 square miles (52.4 km^{2})
Sookholme Brook Catchment (trib of Meden)	Poor	Fail	2.3 miles (3.7 km)	4.09 square miles (10.6 km^{2})
Meden from Sookholme Brook to Maun	Poor	Fail	9.2 miles (14.8 km)	16.06 square miles (41.6 km^{2})

Water quality in the upper river has improved but has deteriorated in the lower river, as both were moderate in 2016. Like most rivers in the UK, the chemical status changed from good to fail in 2019, due to the presence of polybrominated diphenyl ethers (PBDE) and mercury compounds, neither of which had previously been included in the assessment.

== Points of interest ==
Point	Coordinates (Links to map resources)	OS Grid Ref	Notes
Meden and Maun form Idle	53.2685°N 0.9478°W	SK702751	mouth
Meden and Maun join and split	53.2410°N 1.0143°W	SK658720	
Thoresby Lake	53.2287°N 1.0496°W	SK635706	
A60 bridge, Church Warsop	53.2111°N 1.1497°W	SK568685	
Robin Hood Line bridge	53.1823°N 1.2043°W	SK532653	
Pleasley Vale and Mills	53.1792°N 1.2261°W	SK518649	
Springs	53.1417°N 1.3072°W	SK464607	source
Springs	53.1355°N 1.2728°W	SK487600	source

== Bibliography ==
- Butler, Terry (1997). "Countryside Appraisal - Magnesian Limestone Ridge (Section:1, 3)". Nottinghamshire County Council. Archived from the original on 20 March 2012.
- CAMS (2006). The Idle and Torne Catchment Abstraction Management Strategy (PDF). Environment Agency. Archived from the original (PDF) on 15 January 2018.
- Mansfield (January 2009). "Pleasley Park and Vale Conservation Area". Mansfield District Council, Bolsover District Council. Archived from the original on 24 April 2014.
