= Thoresby Hall =

Grade I listed hotel in Newark and Sherwood, United Kingdom

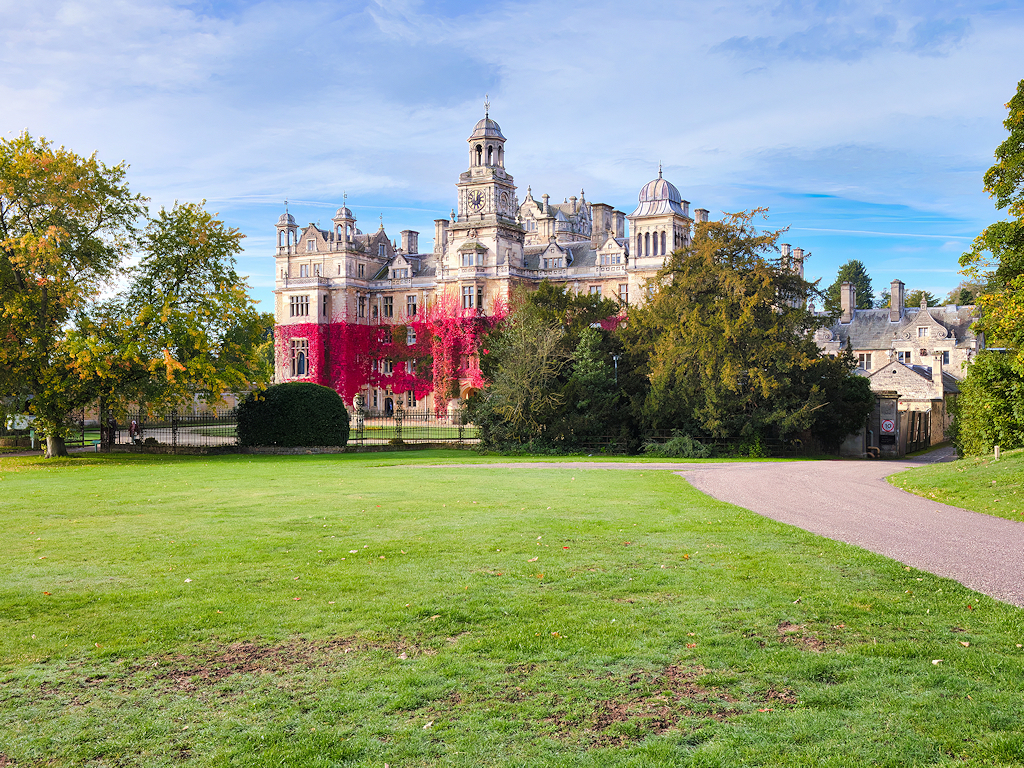
- A view of the hall

- Location within Nottinghamshire

General information
- Location: Thoresby Estate, Netherfield Lane, Budby, Nottinghamshire, NG22 9EP
- Coordinates: 53.233101°N 1.044147°W
- Current tenants: Warner Leisure Hotels; The Royal Lancers and Nottinghamshire Yeomanry Museum (Part of Courtyard)
- Construction started: 1864
- Completed: 1871
- Client: Sydney Pierrepont, 3rd Earl Manvers
- Owner: Warner Leisure Hotels
- Landlord: Warner Leisure Hotels

Design and construction
- Architect: Anthony Salvin

Website
- thoresby.com

Listed Building – Grade I
- Official name: Thoresby Hall
- Designated: 11 August 1961
- Reference no.: 1045449

National Register of Historic Parks and Gardens
- Designated: 1 January 1986
- Reference no.: 1000361

Thoresby Hall is a 19th-century country house and park in Budby, Nottinghamshire, some 2 miles (4 km) north of Ollerton. It is one of four neighbouring country houses and estates in the Dukeries in north Nottinghamshire all occupied by dukes at one time during their history. The hall is constructed of rock-faced ashlar with ashlar dressings. It is built in four storeys with a square floor plan surrounding a central courtyard, nine window bays wide and eight bays deep.

== History ==
Robert Pierrepont, 1st Earl of Kingston-upon-Hull acquired the Thoresby lands in 1633, but was killed in the Civil War in 1643. His son Henry Pierrepont, the 2nd Earl, built the first grand house, attributed to the architect Talman, about 1670. The house was remodelled for William Pierrepont, the 4th Earl, during 1685–87, probably by Benjamin Jackson, after the earl had been granted the right in 1683 to create the park by enclosure from Sherwood Forest. The house was the birthplace of Lady Mary Pierrepont, wife of Edward Wortley Montagu, in 1689.

The estate passed to Evelyn Pierrepont, 2nd Duke of Kingston-upon-Hull (1711–1773), who fought at the Battle of Culloden in 1746 and during whose ownership the house was destroyed by fire that same year. Twenty years later the architect John Carr during 1767–1772 built a new house on the same site. Humphry Repton landscaped the park at the same time.

When the 2nd Duke died in 1773 he left the estate to his wife, Elizabeth Chudleigh, the former wife of the Earl of Bristol. After a very public court case, she was declared married bigamously to the duke and obliged to surrender the property on her death in 1786 to the duke's nephew, Charles Medows, a Royal Navy officer. He adopted the name Pierrepont and later became the 1st Earl Manvers.

In 1868, Sydney Pierrepont, the 3rd Earl Manvers, commissioned the celebrated country house architect Anthony Salvin to demolish the house after just a hundred years and replace it with the present house, erected 500 metres (550 yd) to the north. Completed in 1871, it measures 55 metres (180 ft) on its east and south fronts and 48 metres (157 ft) on its west front. The impressive Great Hall, with minstrels' gallery at the west end, is 19 metres (62 ft) long and 14 metres (46 ft) high. The house descended to Gervas Pierrepont, 6th Earl Manvers who died in 1955 without a male heir and the title thereby became extinct. The house remained with his wife, Countess Manvers, and their daughter Lady Rozelle Raynes.

To minimise a perceived threat from coal mining subsidence the buildings were sold to the National Coal Board in 1979 and sold on the open market ten years later. In 2020 these fears came to light when abandoned mine workings subsided below the property, which required repairs from the Coal Authority. The core of the Thoresby furniture collection was retained by the family who built a new house on the other side of the lake, while the remainder was sold at auction by Sotheby's in 1989. After a number of owners it was acquired by Warner Leisure Hotels. The 8,400-square-metre (90,000 sq ft) Salvin house had a new bedroom wing added before opening as a 200-room country house hotel with spa facilities in 2000.

The Royal Lancers and Nottinghamshire Yeomanry Museum occupies part of the courtyard which is now open to the public as a retail space.

== Amenities ==
Thoresby Park is open to visitors. The courtyard has a cafe and there are several gift shops.

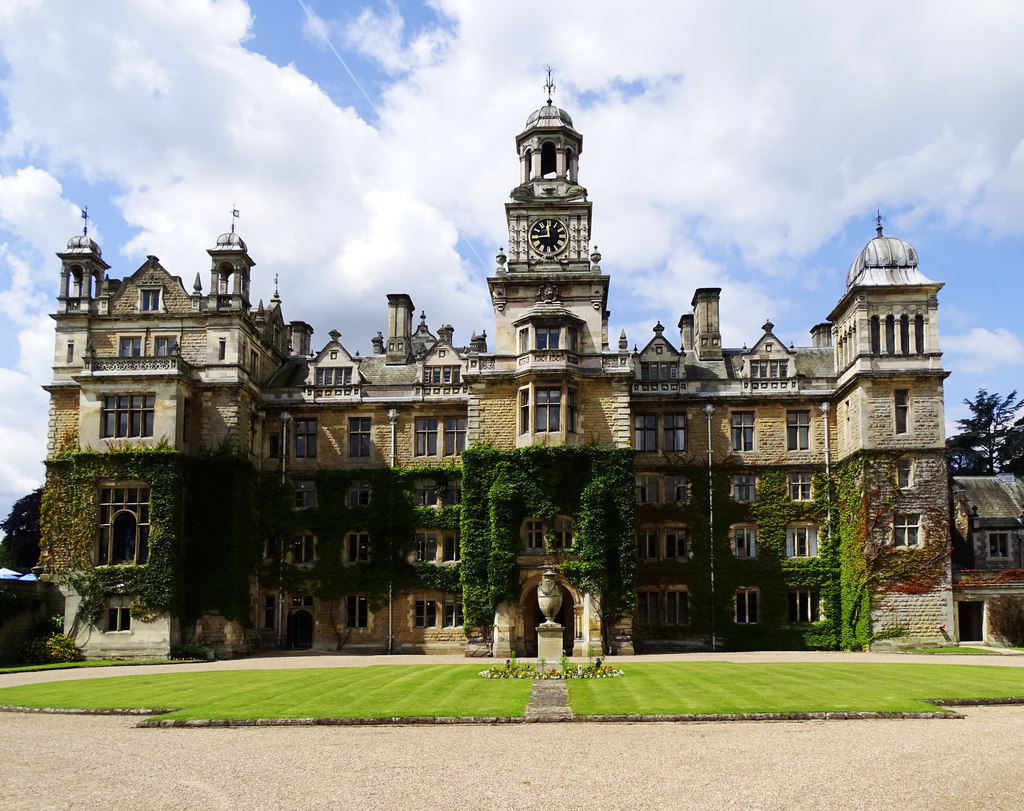
Thoresby Hall, East Elevation

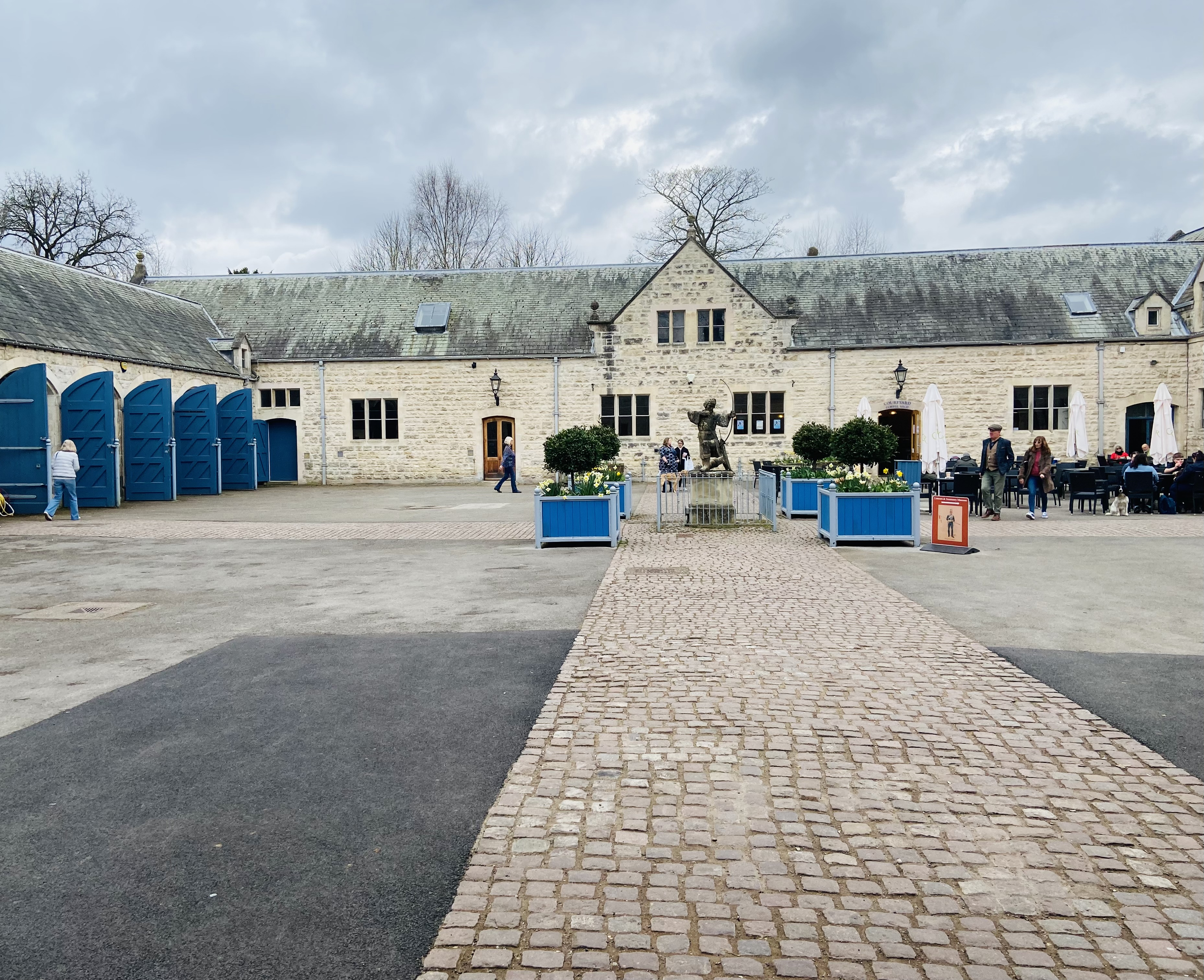
Thoresby Hall Courtyard

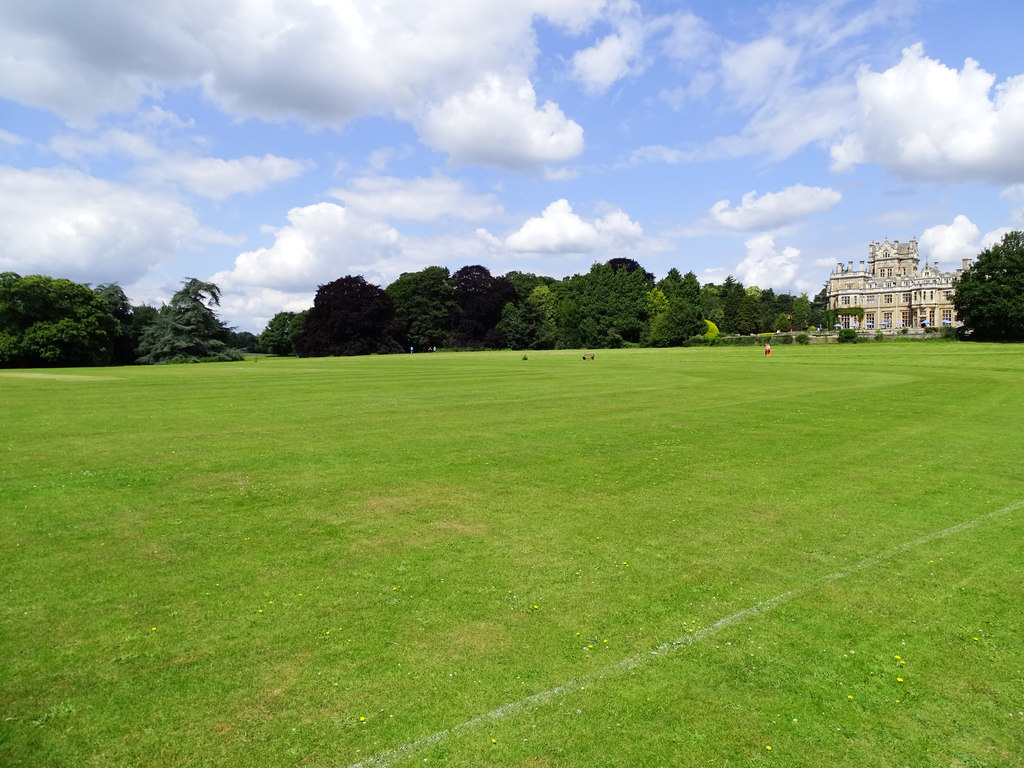
Thoresby Park and cricket field

== See also ==
- Grade I listed buildings in Nottinghamshire
- Listed buildings in Perlethorpe cum Budby
