= Kneesall =

Village and civil parish in Nottinghamshire, England

Coordinates: 53.171°N 0.948°W

- Village and civil parish
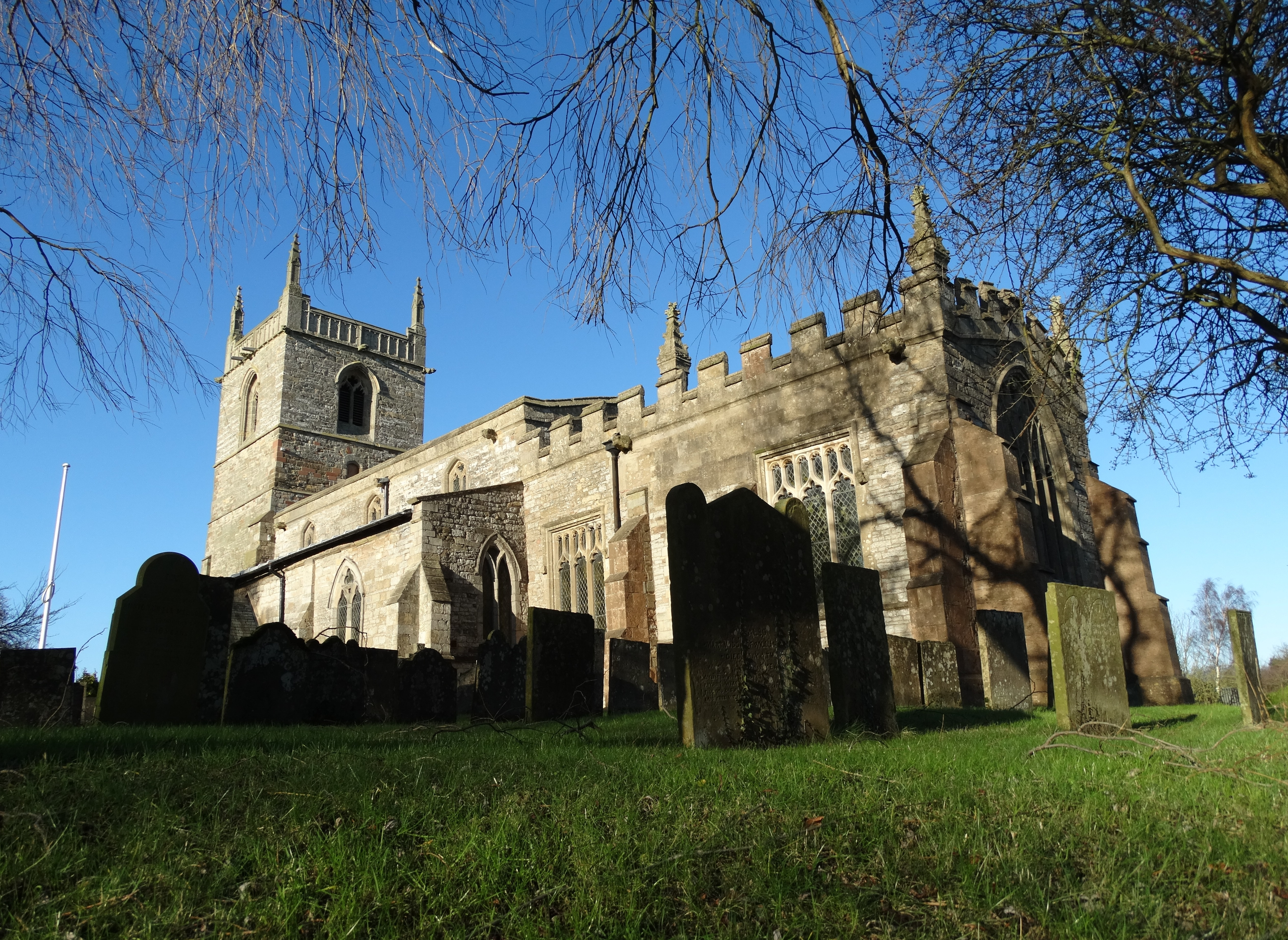
- St Bartholomew's church

- Location within Nottinghamshire
- Interactive map of Kneesall
- Area: 3.6 sq mi (9.3 km^{2})
- Population: 227 (2021)
  - Density: 63/sq mi (24/km^{2})
- OS grid reference: SK 703643
  - London: 120 mi (190 km) SSE
- District: Newark and Sherwood
- Shire county: Nottinghamshire
- Region: East Midlands
- Country: England
- Sovereign state: United Kingdom
- Post town: NEWARK
- Postcode district: NG22
- Dialling code: 01623
- Police: Nottinghamshire
- Fire: Nottinghamshire
- Ambulance: East Midlands
- UK Parliament: Newark
- Website: https://www.kkopc.org.uk/

Kneesall is a village and civil parish in the East Midlands of England in the county of Nottinghamshire. The population of the civil parish at the 2011 census was 221, increasing slightly to 227 at the 2021 census. Forming part of the Newark and Sherwood district, Kneesall is situated on the A616 road between Newark-on-Trent and Ollerton. The village is three miles from neighbouring Eakring and four miles from Laxton.

Kneesall has a small C of E primary school teaching children from many of the surrounding villages, and making up a part of the 3KANDO network, along with Averham, and Dean Hole C of E Primary. Kneesall was once well known for its one pub, The Angel Inn. The Angel has changed management multiple times in the last decade, most recently reopening in summer 2014. Though having no shops, the village did have a post office, that was closed in 1995. The centre of the villages activities are in the Church, which in 2004 was partly converted into the Bill Helmsley Community Centre, which continues to host local clubs and many events. Kneesall is home to Old Hall, built c. 1515–1540 and likely to be the oldest brick building in Nottinghamshire.

There was a windmill beside the Newark Road, marked on a 1774 map, which replaced an earlier mill known as Mettam's Mill. In 1795 the mill belonged to William Taylor.

Though Kingston farm has not been active in Kneesall since 2003, Kneesall is surrounded by open fields that are still farmed by a contractor producing crops such as wheat and rape seed, and still has a dairy farm, providing milk for local villages.

The village, though having a 30 mph speed limit throughout, has seen many car accidents, some of which have been fatal.
