= UK house =

UK house may refer to:

- House music in the United Kingdom
- United Kingdom House, building in London
- Housing in the United Kingdom

== See also ==
- Parliament of the United Kingdom
  - House of Commons of the United Kingdom, lower house
  - House of Lords of the United Kingdom, upper house
- Royal houses of UK monarchs:
  - House of Stuart (1707–1714)
  - House of Hanover (1714–1901)
  - House of Saxe-Coburg and Gotha (1901–1936)
  - House of Windsor (1936–present)
