= Oxford Street =

Major street in the City of Westminster in London, England

- View down the pedestrianised section of Oxford Street. October 2026.

- Location within City of Westminster
- Former name: Via Trinobantina Tyburn Road
- Maintained by: Transport for London
- Length: 2 km (1.2 mi)
- Location: London, United Kingdom
- Postal code: W1
- Nearest tube station: Marble Arch; Bond Street; Oxford Circus; Tottenham Court Road
- Coordinates: 51°30′55″N 00°08′31″W
- West end: Marble Arch
- East end: Tottenham Court Road / Charing Cross Road

Other
- Known for: 100 Club; Debenhams; HMV; House of Fraser; John Lewis & Partners; Marble Arch; Oxford Circus; Selfridges
- Website: oxfordstreet.co.uk

Oxford Street is a major road in the City of Westminster in the West End of London, running between Marble Arch and Tottenham Court Road via Oxford Circus. It marks the notional boundary between the areas of Fitzrovia and Marylebone to the north, with Soho and Mayfair to its immediate south. It is Europe's busiest shopping street, with around 300,000 daily visitors, and as of 2012 had approximately 300 shops. It is designated as part of the A40, a major road between London and Fishguard, though it is not signed as such, and traffic is regularly restricted to buses and taxis, including a section that has been completely pedestrianised.

The road was originally part of the Via Trinobantina, a Roman road between Essex and Hampshire via London. It was known as Tyburn Road through the Middle Ages when it was notorious for public hangings of prisoners at Tyburn Gallows. It became known as Oxford Road and then Oxford Street in the 18th century and began to change from residential to commercial and retail use, attracting street traders, confidence tricksters, and prostitution. Department stores began to dominate the streetscape in the early 20th century, the most imposing of all being Selfridges (which opened in 1909). The street suffered heavy bombing during World War II, and several longstanding stores including John Lewis & Partners were completely destroyed and rebuilt from scratch.

Despite competition from out-of-town shopping centres and online retailers, Oxford Street remains in high demand as a retail location, with many British retail chains having their flagship stores on the street, and having a number of listed buildings. Unlike nearby shopping streets such as Bond Street, it has retained an element of downmarket trading alongside more prestigious retail stores. Generally speaking, the eastern end of Oxford Street features a higher proportion of more downmarket retailers, fast food restaurants, and souvenir shops whilst more exclusive and upmarket stores can be found towards its western end which passes close to the wealthy Mayfair district. The construction of Crossrail (known subsequently as the Elizabeth line) in the 2010s and early 2020s has changed the eastern end of Oxford Street markedly, with several major buildings having to be demolished completely to facilitate its construction, which in turn has brought new retailers and entertainment venues to the area. The annual switching on of Christmas lights by a celebrity has been a popular event since 1959.

As a popular retail area and a main thoroughfare for London buses and taxis, Oxford Street has suffered from traffic and pedestrian congestion, a poor safety record, and pollution. Various traffic management schemes have been implemented by Transport for London (TfL) and others, including a ban on private vehicles during daytime hours on weekdays and Saturdays (in place since the 1970s), widened pavements, and improved pedestrian crossings.

Half of Oxford Street was closed to all road traffic including public transport and bicycles in October 2026. The pedestrian zone stretches westwards from Great Portland Street to Orchard Street (near Selfridges).

== Location ==
Oxford Street runs for approximately 1.2 mi (1.9 km), of which 0.6 mi (0.97 km) is pedestrianised. It is entirely within the City of Westminster. The road begins at St Giles Circus as a westward continuation of New Oxford Street, meeting Charing Cross Road, Tottenham Court Road (next to Tottenham Court Road station). It runs past Rathbone Place, Wardour Street, and Great Portland Street to Oxford Circus, where it meets Regent Street. From there it continues past New Bond Street, Bond Street station, and Vere Street, ending at Marble Arch. The route continues as Bayswater Road and Holland Park Avenue towards Shepherd's Bush.

The road is within the London congestion charging zone. It is part of the A40, most of which is a trunk road running from London to Fishguard (via Oxford, Cheltenham, Brecon, and Haverfordwest). Like many roads in Central London that are no longer through routes, it is not signposted with that number.

Prior to 2026, numerous bus routes ran along Oxford Street, including the 55, 73, 94, 98, 159, 390, and Night Buses N8, N55, N73, N98 and N207.

== History ==
=== Early history ===
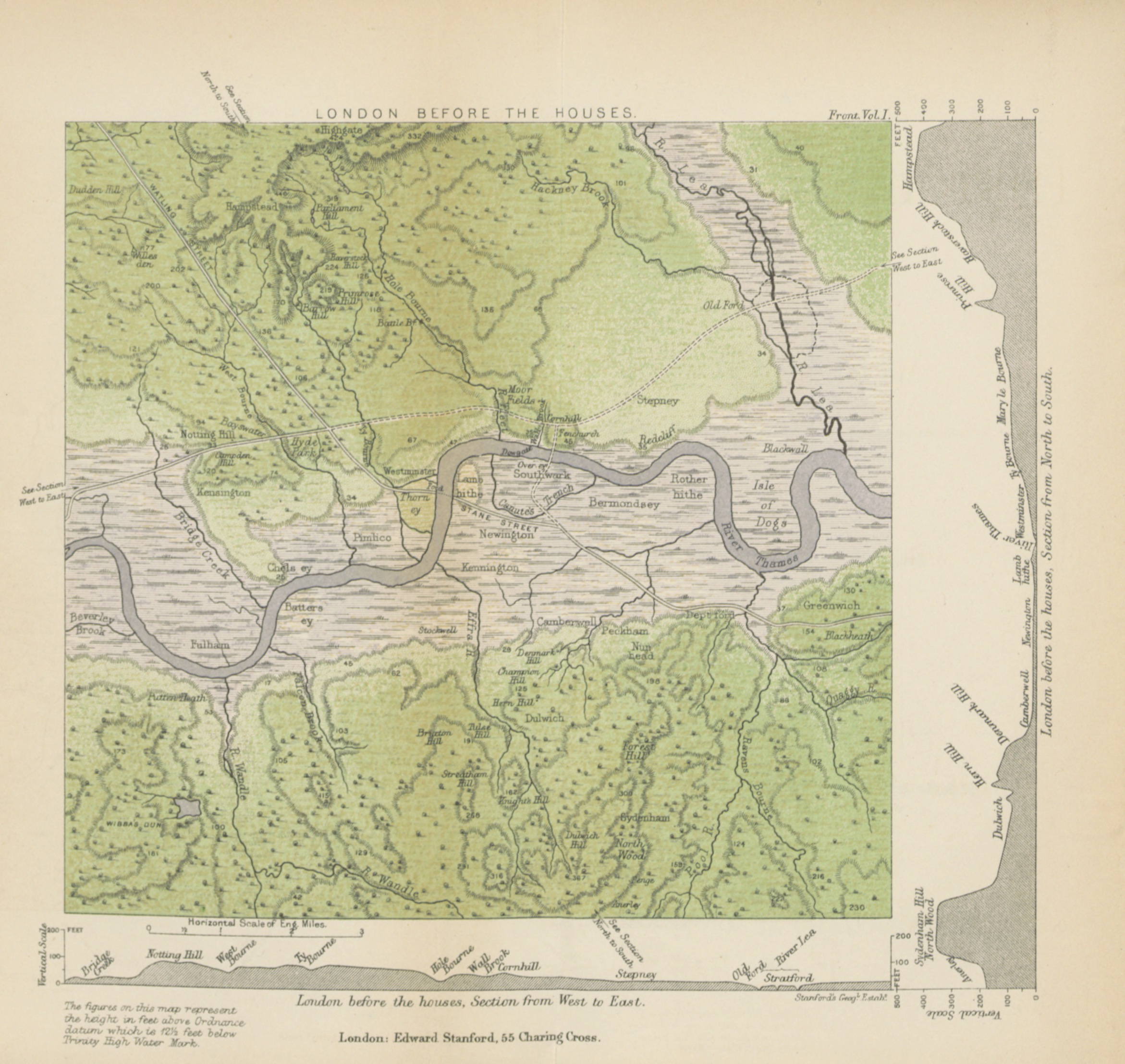

Map of the local area before urbanisation

Oxford Street follows the route of a Roman road, the Via Trinobantina, which linked Calleva Atrebatum (near Silchester, Hampshire) with Camulodunum (now Colchester) via London and became one of the major routes in and out of the city.

Between the 12th century and 1782, it was variously known as Tyburn Road (after the River Tyburn that crossed it north to south), Uxbridge Road (the name still used for the road between Shepherd's Bush and Uxbridge), Worcester Road, and Oxford Road. On Ralph Aggas' "Plan of London", published in the 16th century, the road is described partly as "The Waye to Uxbridge" followed by "Oxford Road", showing rural farmland at the present junction of Oxford Street and Rathbone Place. By 1678 it was known as the "King's Highway", and the "Road To Oxford" by 1682.

Tyburn Parish Church stood on the north side of the road, at the point where it crossed the river (which ran alongside what is now Marylebone Lane). This church (the earliest documented building on Oxford Street) was demolished in 1400, a replacement church having been built further to the north. Later a court house was constructed on the site, which went on to serve as vestry hall for the parish; it continued to function as such until 1920, when it was superseded by Marylebone Town Hall. Tyburn gallows, near where Marble Arch now stands, was a place of public execution from 1388 to 1783.

=== The Georgian era ===
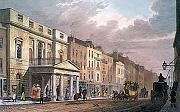
Oxford Street in the late 18th century (with the Pantheon on the left)

Though a major coaching route, there were several obstacles along it, including the bridge over the Tyburn. A turnpike trust was established in 1721 to improve the upkeep of the road. It became notorious as the route taken by prisoners on their final journey from Newgate Prison to the gallows at Tyburn. Spectators jeered as the prisoners were carted along the road, and could buy rope used in the executions from the hangman in taverns. By about 1729, the road had become known as Oxford Street.

Development began in the 18th century after many surrounding fields were purchased by the Earl of Oxford. In 1739, a local gardener, Thomas Huddle, built property on the north side. After Lord Oxford's death the estate was inherited by his daughter the Duchess of Portland; it then passed down to successive dukes as the Portland Estate, before becoming the Howard de Walden Estate in 1879 (by way of the 5th Duke's sister). The Howard de Walden Estate progressively sold off its Oxford Street holdings (which lay on the north side between Marylebone Lane and Wells Street) in the first half of the twentieth century. Other landowning estates held sway over the western end of Oxford Street: most of the northern side west of Duke Street was and is owned by the Portman Estate, while facing it (on the southern side) most of the land west of Davies Street was and is part of the Grosvenor estate; east of both of these, the smaller but significant Conduit Mead Estate (which encompasses Stratford Place and New Bond Street) has been held by the City of London Corporation since the twelfth century. John Rocque's Map of London, published in 1746, shows urban buildings extending as far west as North Audley Street (on the south side) and Marylebone Lane (on the north side), but only intermittent rural property beyond. Further development to the west occurred between 1763 and 1793 when building began on the Portman Estate.

The Pantheon, a place for public entertainment, opened at No. 173 in 1772. The street became popular for entertainment including bear-baiters, theatres, and public houses. However, it was not attractive to the middle and upper classes due to the nearby Tyburn gallows and the notorious St Giles rookery, or slum. The gallows were removed in 1783, and by the end of the century, Oxford Street was built up from St Giles Circus to Park Lane, containing a mix of residential houses, shops and places of entertainment.

Oxford Circus was designed as part of the development of Regent Street by the architect John Nash in 1810. It was later rebuilt (the four quadrants of the circus as seen today were designed by Sir Henry Tanner and constructed between 1913 and 1928).

The Pantheon closed as an entertainment venue in 1814 (twenty years later it was reopened as a covered bazaar); this prompted another bazaar (across the road at No. 150) to close, and in 1836 the Princess's Theatre opened on the site.

=== Retail and transport development ===
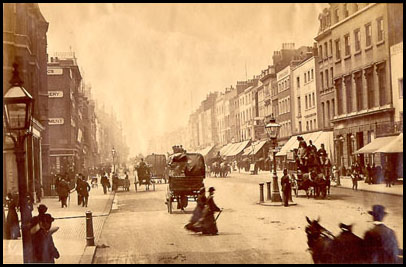
Oxford Street in 1875 (looking towards the present-day site of Selfridges on the right)

Oxford Street changed in character from residential to retail towards the end of the 18th century. Recording an evening visit to the street in 1786, Sophie von La Roche described a multitude of shops lit by Argand lamps behind 'handsome glass windows': confectioners, fruiterers, watchmakers, silversmiths, 'spirit booths' (selling strong drink), glass shops, china shops, silk shops, lamp shops and others. There were also clothing retailers of various sorts, and furniture-makers (such as Gillow & Co., established in 1769). Street vendors sold tourist souvenirs during this time.

A plan in Tallis's London Street Views, published in the late 1830s, remarks that almost all the street, save for the far western end, was primarily retail. Peter Robinson opened his draper's shop at 103 Oxford Street in the 1830s; by the 1890s the shop had expanded to fill the entire block between Great Portland Street and Regent Street. Likewise Marshall & Snelgrove opened on Vere Street in 1837; within 40 years it had expanded to fill the entire block between that street and Marylebone Lane, and was housed (from 1870) in a new building designed by Horace Jones and Octavius Hansard.

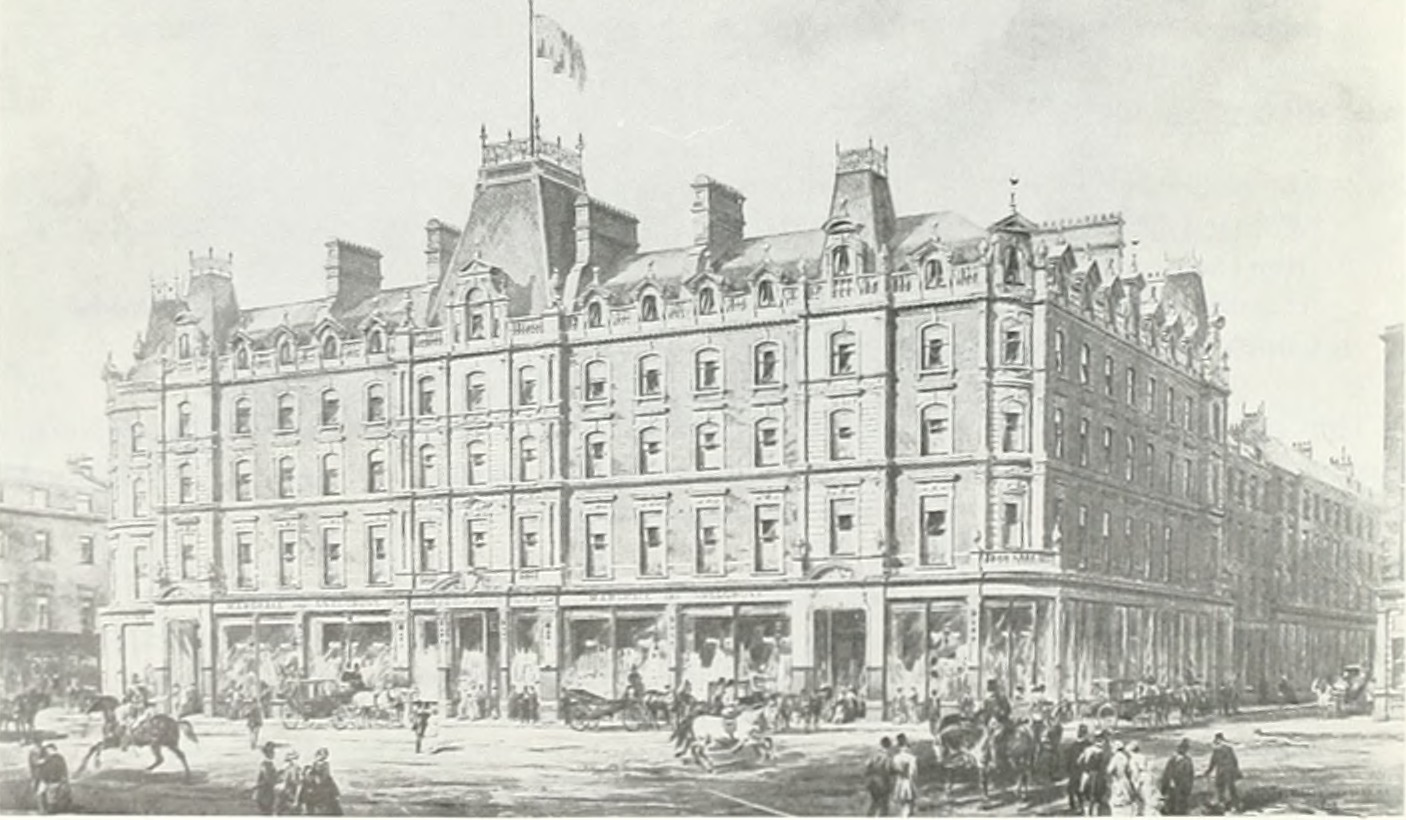
Marshall & Snelgrove's department store building of 1870

What would now be called department stores began to appear on Oxford Street in the 1870s (the rebuilt Marshall & Snelgrove being one of the first). John Lewis started in 1864 in a small shop at No. 132; he took on an adjacent property in 1878, and over the next twenty years expanded further and began rebuilding. Dan Harries Evans opened a small draper's shop at No. 147 in 1879; as D H Evans the business swiftly expanded, taking in more than a dozen properties either side of Old Cavendish Street and becoming one of London's largest drapery establishments by the mid-1890s. At the same time, smaller independent retailers continued to thrive alongside their larger counterparts, specialising in all sorts of different goods, trades, and services.

Meanwhile, construction of the Central London Railway (now the Central line of the London Underground), which runs under Oxford Street for part of its course, began in 1896, which necessitated the development of four new station buildings on or near the street, at Marble Arch, Bond Street, Oxford Circus, and Tottenham Court Road. Of the three chief engineers of the project, only Benjamin Baker lived to see the railway completed. On 27 June 1900, the Prince of Wales (who became King Edward VII the following year) ceremonially opened the line and public services began on 30 July. The line's route below Oxford Street made it the first railway to provide a direct service to the theatre and shopping areas of the West End and the City. The Bakerloo line came to Oxford Circus on 10 March 1906, and the Hampstead line to Tottenham Court Road on 22 June 1907 (it became the Northern line thirty years later).

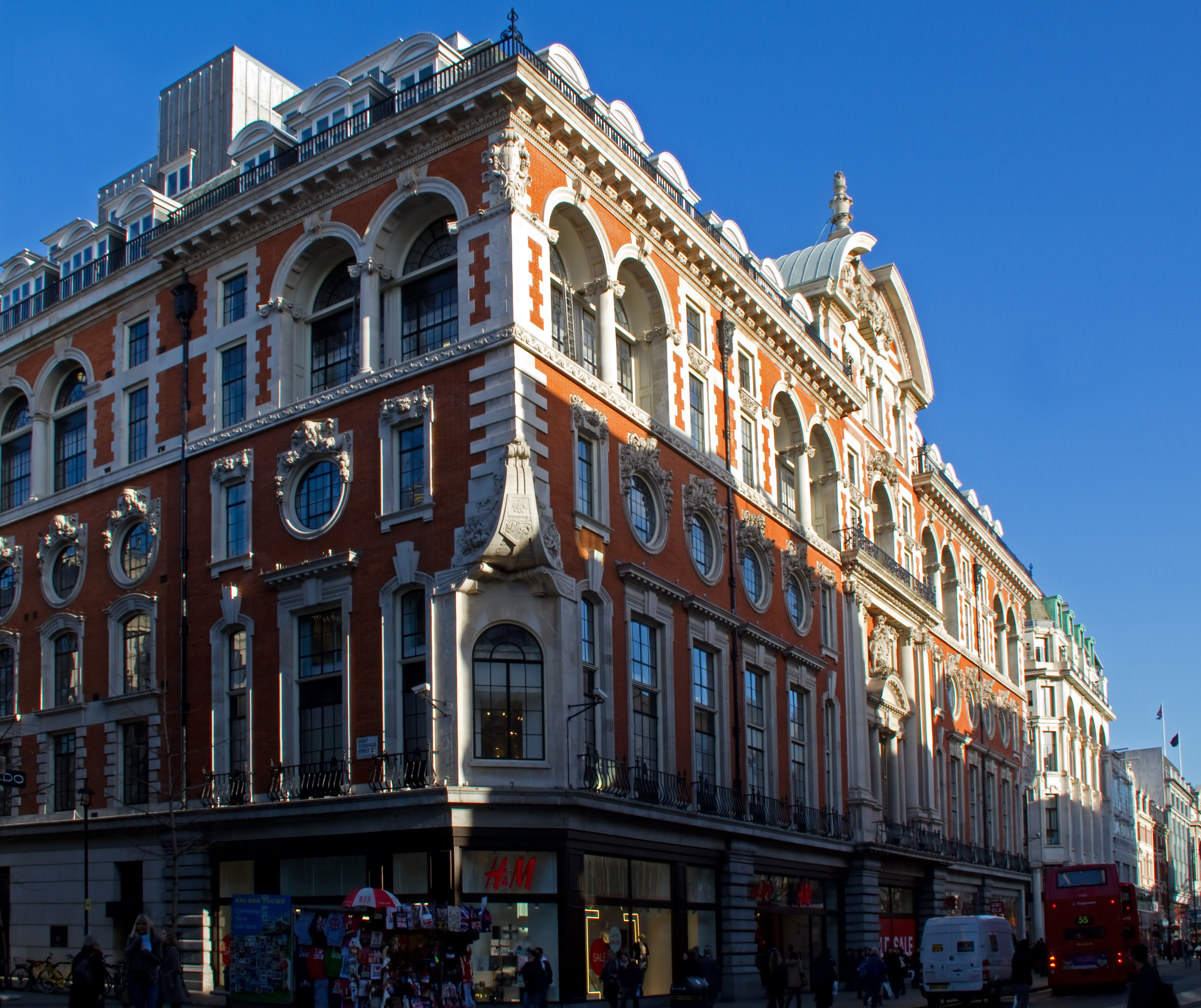
Former Waring & Gillow store of 1906 ('United Kingdom House')

Development continued through the first half of the 20th century, with Bourne & Hollingsworth opening in 1902. When Waring & Gillow opened their new store in 1906 it became the first West End store to occupy an entire city block. Selfridges opened on 15 March 1909 at No. 400; it promptly had a 'transformative influence on Britain's retail scene, elevating the concept of a department store as a social and cultural institution open to everyone, with innovative window dressing, exceptional customer service and masterly advertising'. Shoemakers Lilley & Skinner acquired the lease of 358–360 Oxford Street in 1914; they later expanded into Nos. 356–366, reputedly becoming the world's largest shoe store in 1921. In 1922 C&A purchased Nos. 376–384 (before long C&A had three stores on Oxford Street, which remained the case until their withdrawal from the UK market in 2001).

It is notable that all the aforementioned department stores were or are on the north side of the street. Whether this was down to a preference for south-facing shop fronts, or there being better access routes to the north for deliveries and services, or something akin to coincidence remains an open question. Some large stores were opened on the south side of the street in the 20th century: Woolworths opened its first West End store at No. 311 in 1925, followed by a handful of others in the 1930s (for example Littlewoods, which opened its first Central London store at Nos. 207–213 in 1937, later expanding into Nos. 197–205; it was rebuilt in the early 1960s but closed in the early 2000s).

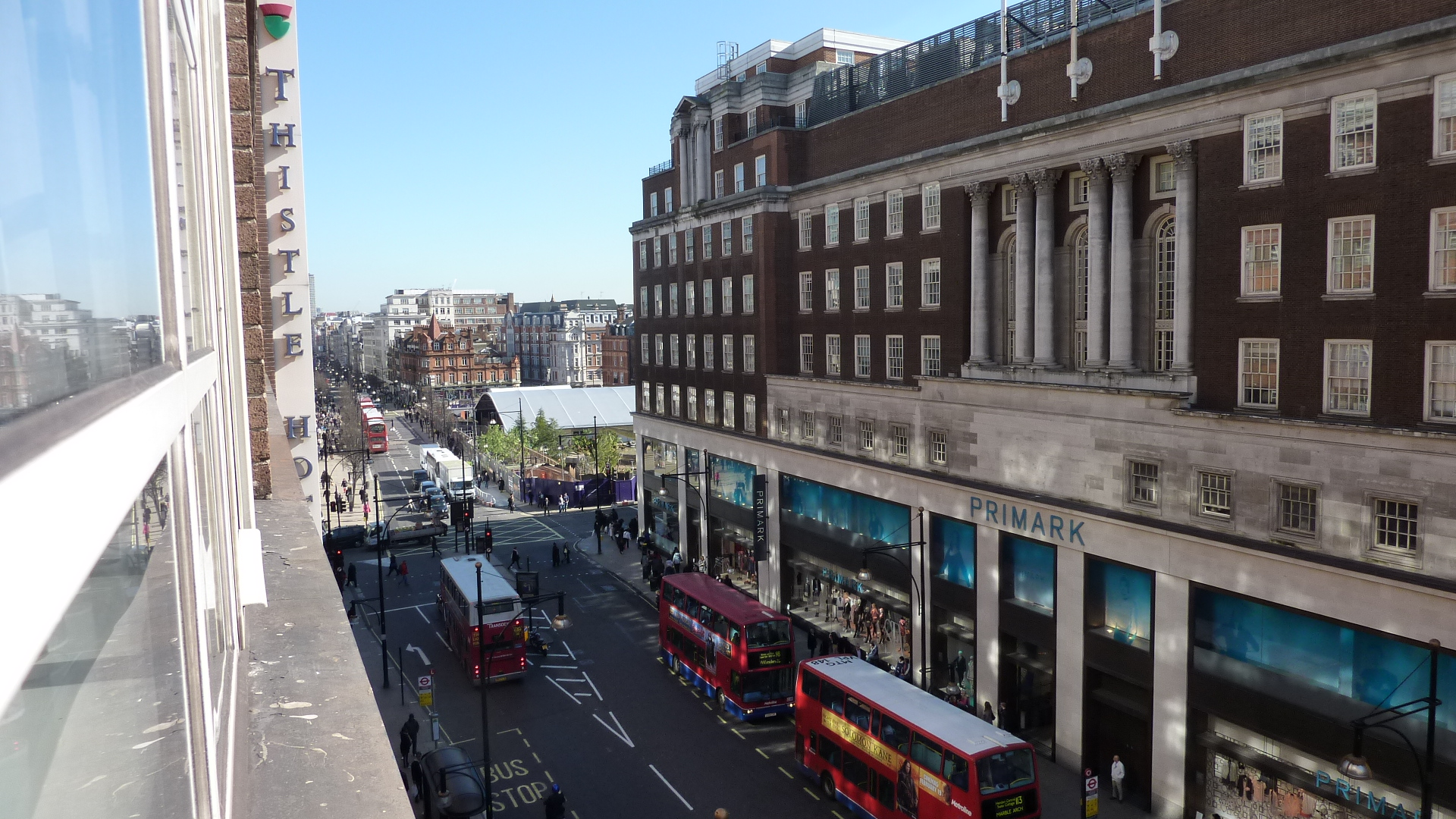
Hereford House of 1928–1930: flats and department store on the south side of the Street (Primark, formerly C&A).

By the 1930s the street was almost entirely retail, a state that still exists today. However, unlike nearby streets such as Bond Street and Park Lane, there remained a seedy element including street traders and prostitutes. Gradually, as the century progressed, independent retailers began to be replaced by chain stores.

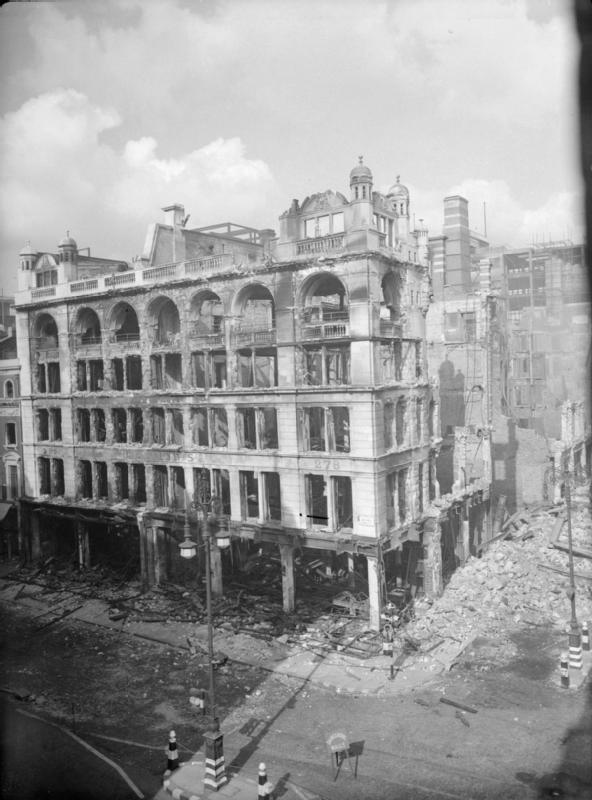
Bomb-damaged shell of John Lewis following an air raid, September 1940

During the Second World War, Oxford Street was bombed several times. Overnight and in the early hours of 17 to 18 September 1940, 268 Heinkel He 111 and Dornier Do 17 bombers targeted the West End, particularly Oxford Street. Many buildings were damaged, either from direct hits or subsequent fires, including four department stores: John Lewis, Selfridges, Bourne & Hollingsworth, and Peter Robinson. George Orwell wrote in his diary on 24 September that Oxford Street was "completely empty of traffic, and only a few pedestrians", and saw "innumerable fragments of broken glass". John Lewis caught fire again on 25 September and was reduced to a shell. It remained a bomb site for the remainder of the war and beyond, finally being demolished and rebuilt between 1958 and 1960. Peter Robinson partially reopened on 22 September, though the main storefront remained boarded up. The basement was converted into studios for the BBC Eastern Service. Orwell made several broadcasts here from 1941 to 1943.

Selfridges was bombed again on 17 April 1941, suffering further damage, including the destruction of the Palm Court Restaurant. The basement was converted to a communications base, with a dedicated line running along Oxford Street to Whitehall. The line allowed British Prime Minister Winston Churchill to make secure and direct telephone calls to US President Franklin D. Roosevelt. The store was damaged again on 6 December 1944 after a V2 rocket exploded on nearby Duke Street, causing its Christmas tree displays to collapse into the street outside. Damage was repaired, and the shop reopened the following day.

=== Postwar ===
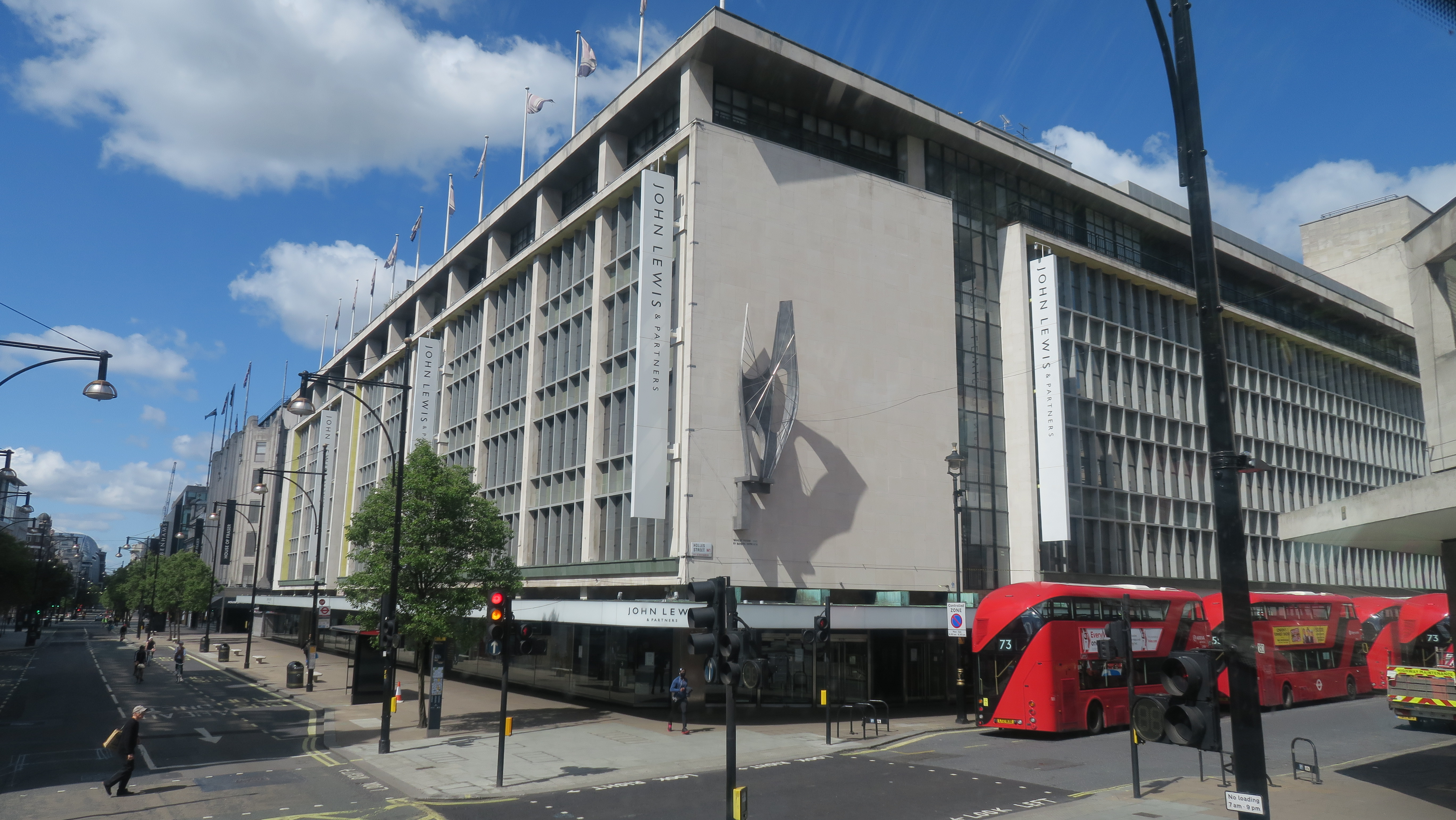
The rebuilt John Lewis, with its Winged Figure sculpture by Barbara Hepworth

After its main store was destroyed, John Lewis operated from properties on the other side of Holles Street (i.e. to the east) until the completion of its new store to the west. Relinquishing these properties then enabled it to purchase the whole of the west side.

1960s office/retail complex: BHS and the London College of Fashion.

Subsequently, the entire block between Holles Street and John Prince's Street was sold by the Howard de Walden Estate to Land Securities for redevelopment: designed by T. P. Bennett & Partners, it would provide small units of retail accommodation on either side of a central flagship department store (namely British Home Stores, until its closure in 2016). Atop the Oxford Street frontage a six-storey block was constructed to house the London College of Fashion, behind which a cluster of taller tower blocks provided office space. Begun in 1959 the work was largely completed within two years; it was one of the largest post-war redevelopment projects to be undertaken in the West End.

From August 1963 until April 1968 part of Oxford Street had to be closed to traffic so that Oxford Circus tube station could be rebuilt to incorporate the new Victoria line, which began serving the station on 7 March 1969, its official opening.

In September 1973 a shopping-bag bomb was detonated by the Irish Republican Army (IRA) at the offices of the Prudential Assurance Company, injuring six people. A second bomb was detonated by the IRA next to Selfridges in December 1974, injuring three people and causing £1.5 million worth of damage. Oxford Street was again targeted by the IRA in August 1975; an undiscovered bomb that had been booby trapped exploded without any injuries.

On 26 October 1981 Kenneth Howorth, an explosives officer with the Metropolitan Police, was killed while defusing a bomb planted by the IRA in the basement toilet of a Wimpy Bar on Oxford Street. The IRA also detonated a bomb at the John Lewis department store in December 1992, along with another in nearby Cavendish Square, injuring four people.

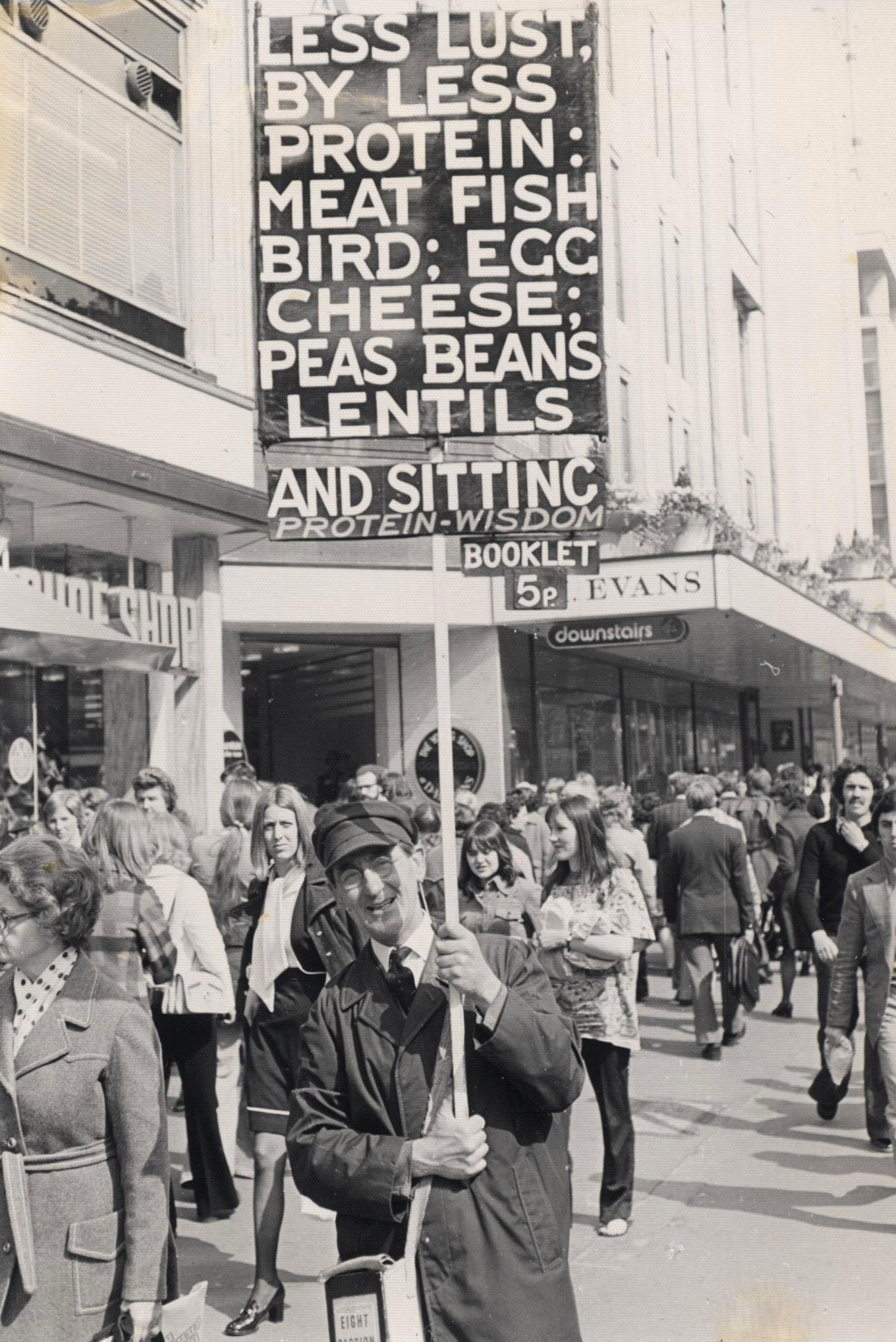
Stanley Green advertising on Oxford Street in 1974

The human billboard Stanley Green began selling on Oxford Street in 1968, advertising his belief in the link of proteins to sexual libido and the dangers therein. He regularly patrolled the street with a placard headlined "less passion from less protein", and advertised his pamphlet Eight Passion Proteins with Care until his death in 1993. His placards are now housed in the British Museum.

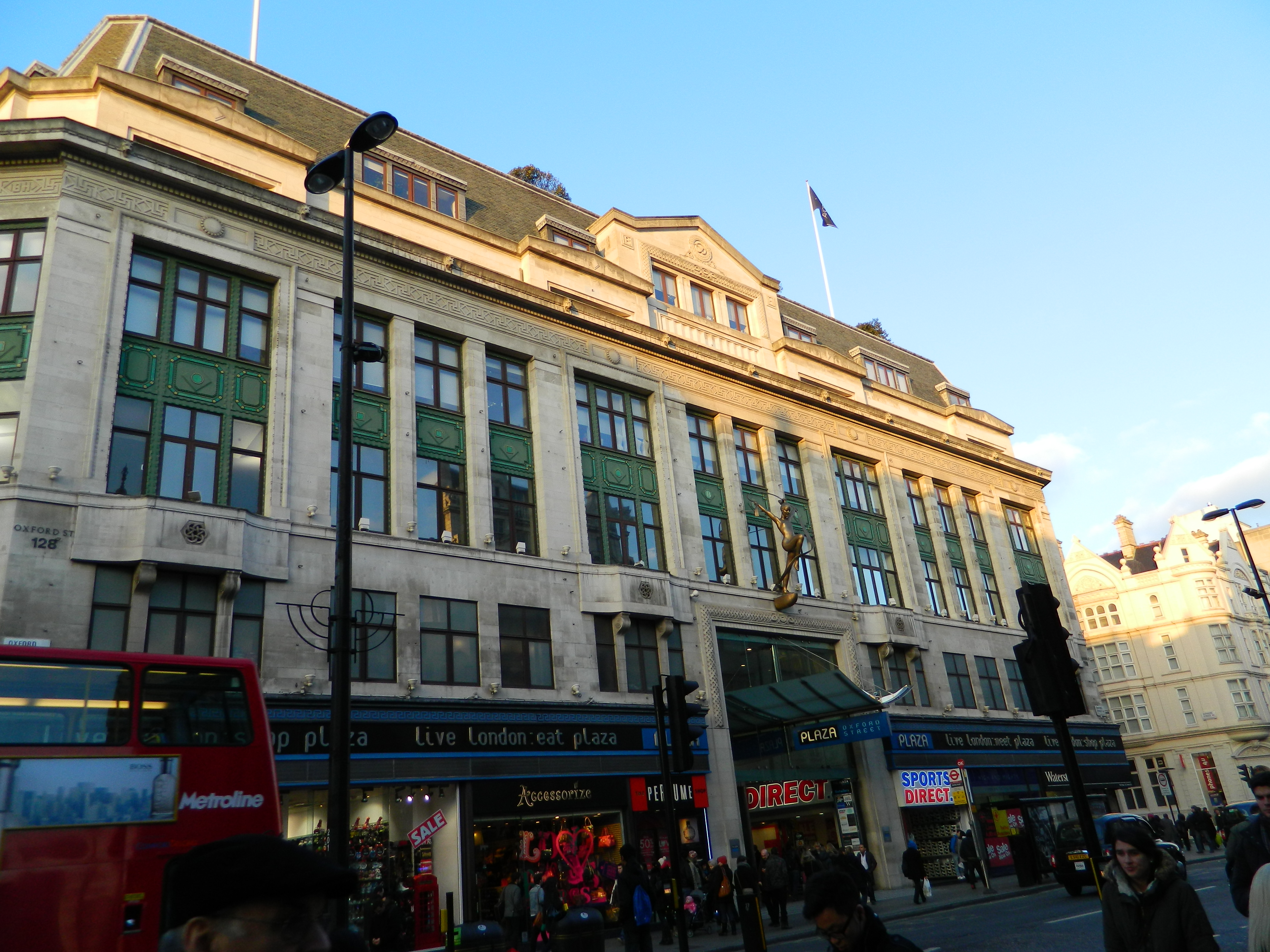
The Plaza shopping centre (ex-Bourne & Hollingsworth) in 2011

The opening of Britain's first out-of-town shopping centre at Brent Cross in 1976 prompted experiments with mall-style shopping precincts on Oxford Street. West One was developed by the Grosvenor Estate on the corner of Davies Street as part of the rebuilding of Bond Street tube station for the Jubilee line in 1979; it opened the following year. In 1986 The Plaza shopping centre was opened within the walls of the former Bourne & Hollingsworth department store building (dating from 1925–1928), the latter having closed three years earlier. The Plaza itself closed in 2016 and a flagship Next store was opened on the site.

=== COVID pandemic and subsequent changes ===
The principal Topshop store by Oxford Circus shut in late 2020 after its parent company, Arcadia Group, went into administration, and Debenhams' flagship store closed (during the third COVID lockdown) in January 2021. A year later, following the spread of the SARS-CoV-2 Omicron variant, the Government introduced new lockdown restrictions, which caused problems with businesses along Oxford Street, which had been hampered by the pandemic since the previous year. The House of Fraser store closed in January 2022 as a result. An analyst at GlobalData said the street "has been forever changed by the closure, or in some cases, downsizing of long-standing department stores".

By 2023 over 15% of retail premises on the street were vacant, and among those that remained open there had been a proliferation of 'American candy stores' and vape shops. Subsequently the situation improved, in particular at the eastern end of the street (following completion of the new Tottenham Court Road Station), and in 2024 Westminster City Council announced a number of improvement measures. As of 2024, the former Debenhams and House of Fraser department stores were being converted into office buildings (with the ground floor retained for retail), and Marks & Spencer received planning permission to demolish their flagship Marble Arch store and replace it with a ten-storey office scheme (again with some space retained for retail). John Lewis, however, reversed an earlier decision to turn half its building into office space, and instead reopened across all six floors.

In December 2023, pro-Palestinian demonstrators marched along Oxford Street during the busy Christmas shopping season, blocking traffic and disrupting retail activity. The protest, which included calls for boycotts of brands such as Zara and Puma, was part of wider rallies across London and the UK linked to the Gaza war.

== New Oxford Street ==
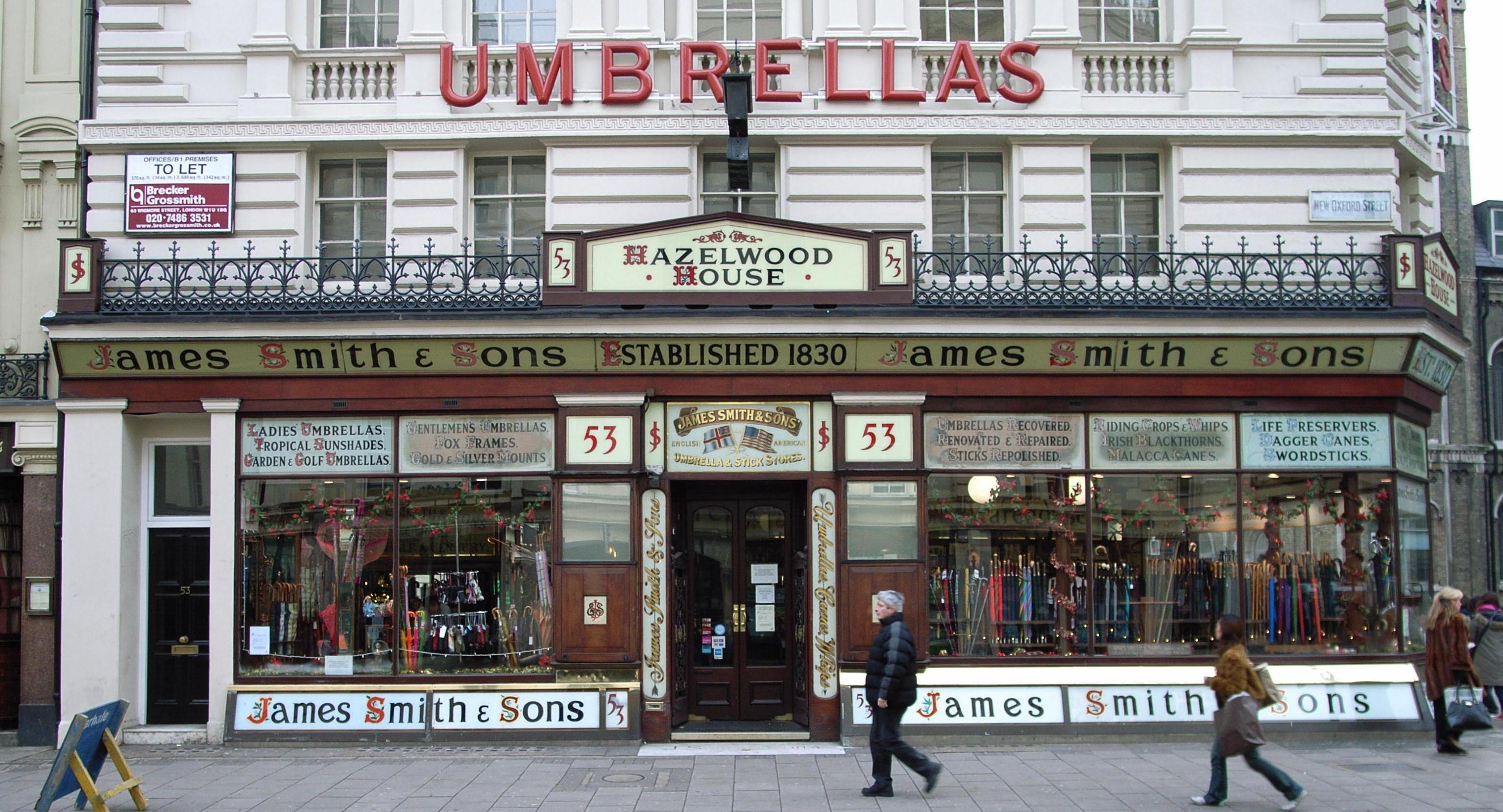
James Smith & Sons has been at 53 New Oxford Street since 1867.

New Oxford Street was built in 1847, in accordance with a plan of James Pennethorne, to link the eastern end of Oxford Street with High Holborn. It extends the axis of Oxford Street eastwards from St Giles Circus. Previously, the route into the City of London had deviated southwards at this point, to skirt around the ancient settlement of St Giles with its leper hospital. The building of the new street involved much slum clearance, but did not entirely eradicate the notorious old rookeries. Once a fashionable shopping street, a preponderance of office buildings has led to New Oxford Street no longer sharing the activity or ambience of its namesake; but in its central section a number of original 1840s stuccoed buildings have survived, providing a glimpse of its former character.

Centre Point, at the corner of New Oxford Street and Charing Cross Road, was one of London's first skyscrapers (designed by R. Seifert & Partners and completed in 1966). The 121-metre (397 ft) tower was built by property developer Harry Hyams (with support from the London County Council planning department) as a speculative investment; left empty for over a decade, it was occupied for a time by protesters, demonstrating against a lack of suitable accommodation in central London. In 2015, building work began to convert it into residential flats; the restoration and conversion was completed in March 2018. Much as had been the case at its original opening, the refurbished tower remains largely empty, with few windows lit in the evenings, the rest in darkness, despite at least half its units being sold; this has led to its being called one of London's "ghost towers".

== Buildings ==
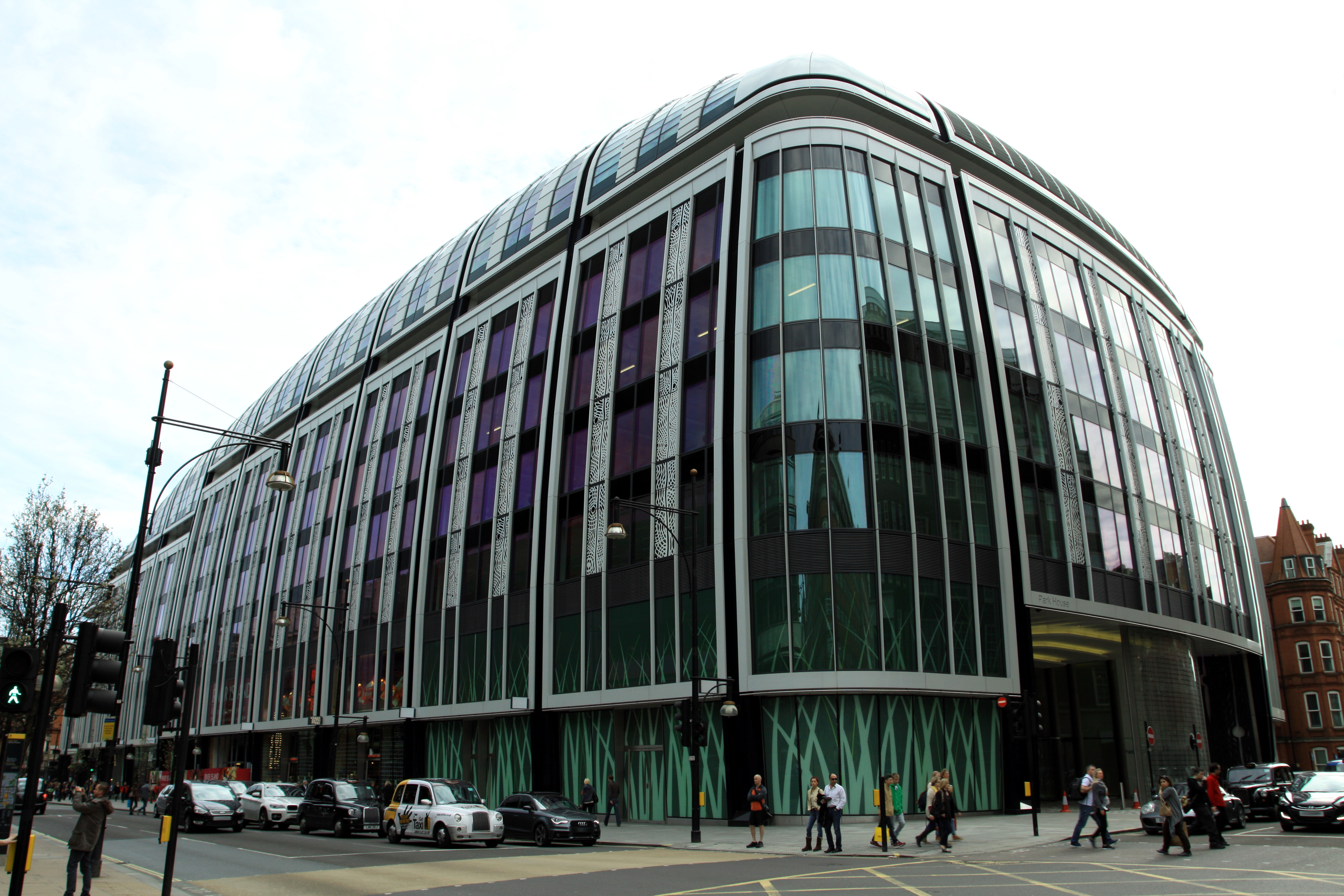
Park House (2012): the latest of many new buildings to have stood here since this parcel of land was first developed in the 1760s.

Oxford Street is home to a number of major department stores and flagship retail outlets, containing over 300 shops as of 2012. It is the most frequently visited shopping street in Inner London, attracting over half a million daily visitors in 2014, and is one of the most popular destinations in London for tourists, with an annual estimated turnover of over £1 billion. It forms part of a shopping district in the West End of London, along with other streets including Covent Garden, Bond Street and Piccadilly.

The New West End Company, formerly the Oxford Street Association, oversees stores and trade along the street; its objective is to make the place safe and desirable for shoppers. The group has been critical of overcrowding and the quality of shops and has clamped down on abusive traders, who were then refused licences.

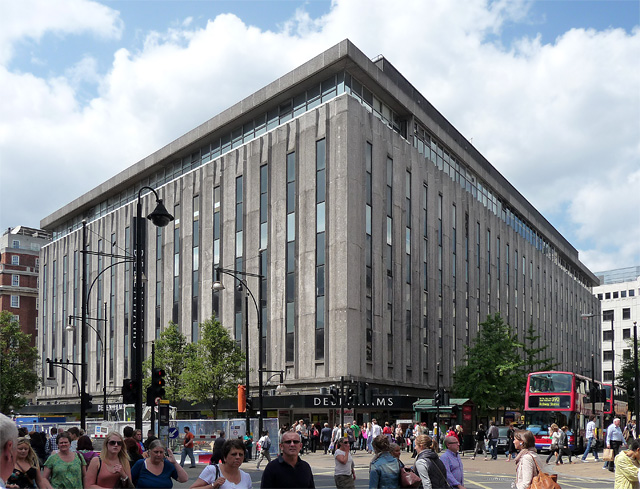
Debenhams, 1969–1975: 'big and dispiriting', according to Pevsner.

Several British retail chains regard their Oxford Street branch as the flagship store. In 1919 Marshall & Snelgrove merged with Debenhams (which had opened in nearby Wigmore Street in 1778). The Oxford Street store continued to trade as Marshall & Snelgrove until 1972, when the rebuilt premises were reopened as Debenhams. (Debenhams' flagship Oxford Street store closed in 2021.)

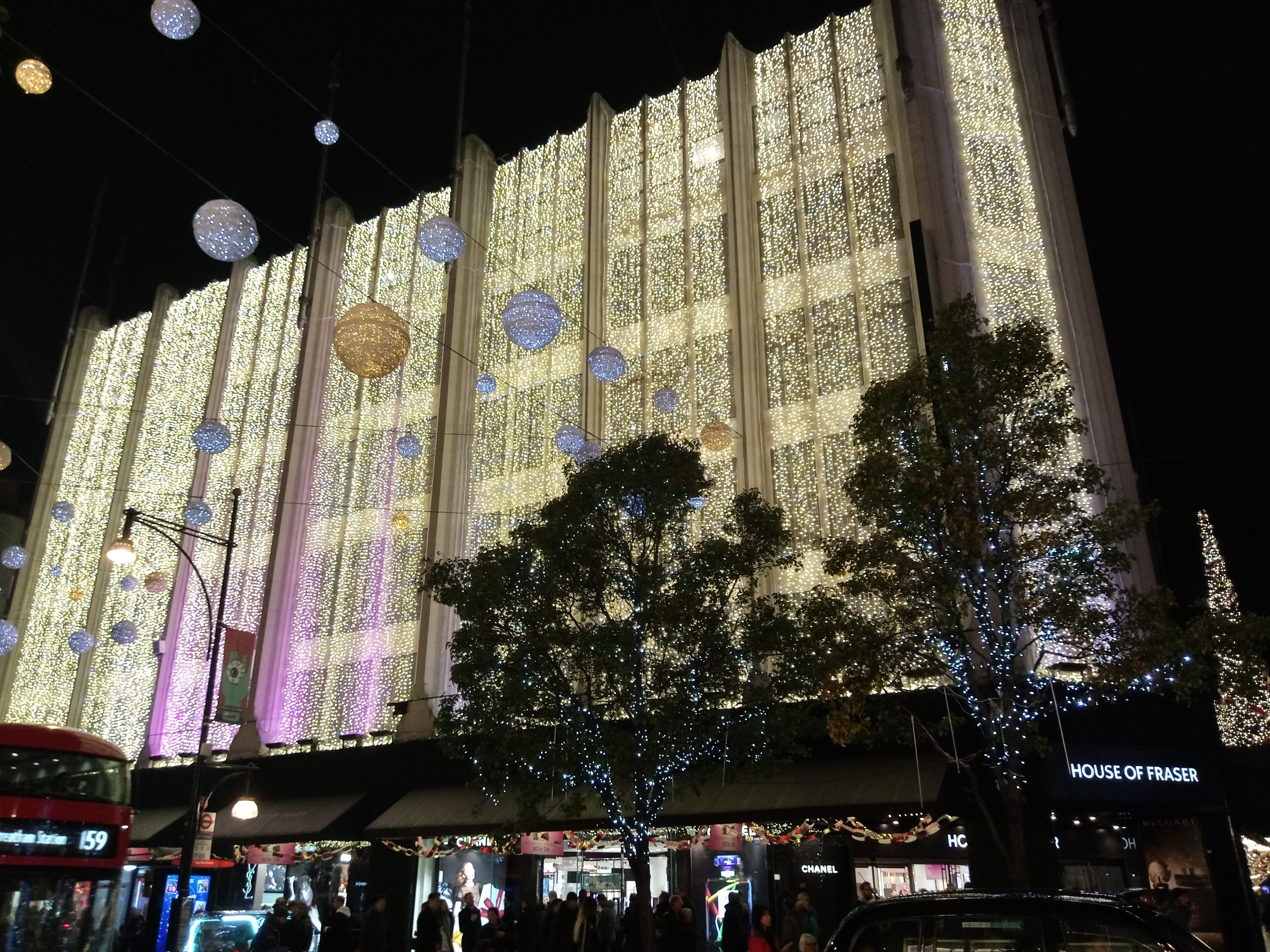
House of Fraser (with Christmas illuminations) in 2017

The London flagship store of House of Fraser began as D. H. Evans in 1879; its current premises were designed by Louis Blanc and opened in 1937. It was the first department store in the UK with escalators serving every floor. It retained the D. H. Evans name until 2001, when it was rebranded as House of Fraser (the name of the parent company). House of Fraser closed in 2022.

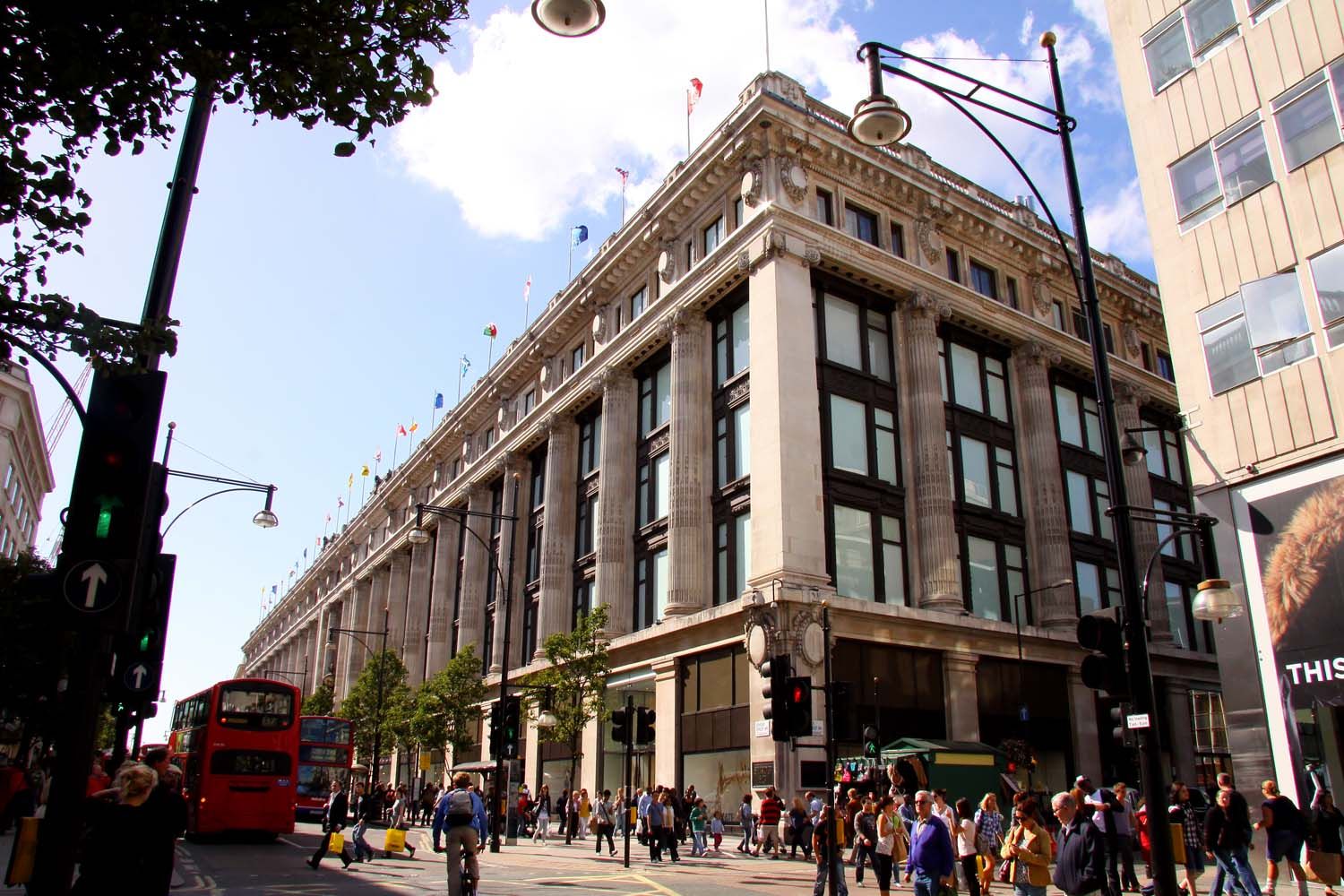
Selfridges, 'extraordinary temple of the retail trade', was built in stages between 1906 and 1928.

Selfridges, Oxford Street, the second-largest department store in the UK and the flagship of the Selfridges chain, has been trading in Oxford Street since 1909. The building was erected in four stages over a twenty-two year period, having been designed by a combination of architects including D. H. Burnham & Company, Frank Atkinson, Sir John Burnet and Thomas Tait. Its construction was influenced by American high rise technology: steel framing and reinforced concrete were employed to create a large and adaptable retail space, and their use was subsequently widely adopted across the UK's high streets. The frontage to Oxford Street was, on completion, the largest shop façade in London.

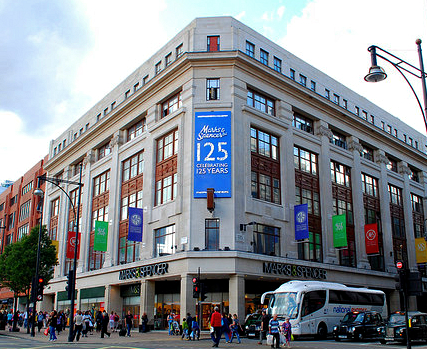
Marks & Spencer, Marble Arch: the 1929 Art Deco building has been threatened with demolition since 2021.

Marks & Spencer has two stores on Oxford Street. The first, Marks & Spencer Marble Arch, is at the junction with Orchard Street; it was opened in 1930. The second branch, which opened eight years later, is between Regent Street and Tottenham Court Road, on the former site of the Pantheon. Both premises were significantly expanded in the second half of the 20th century.

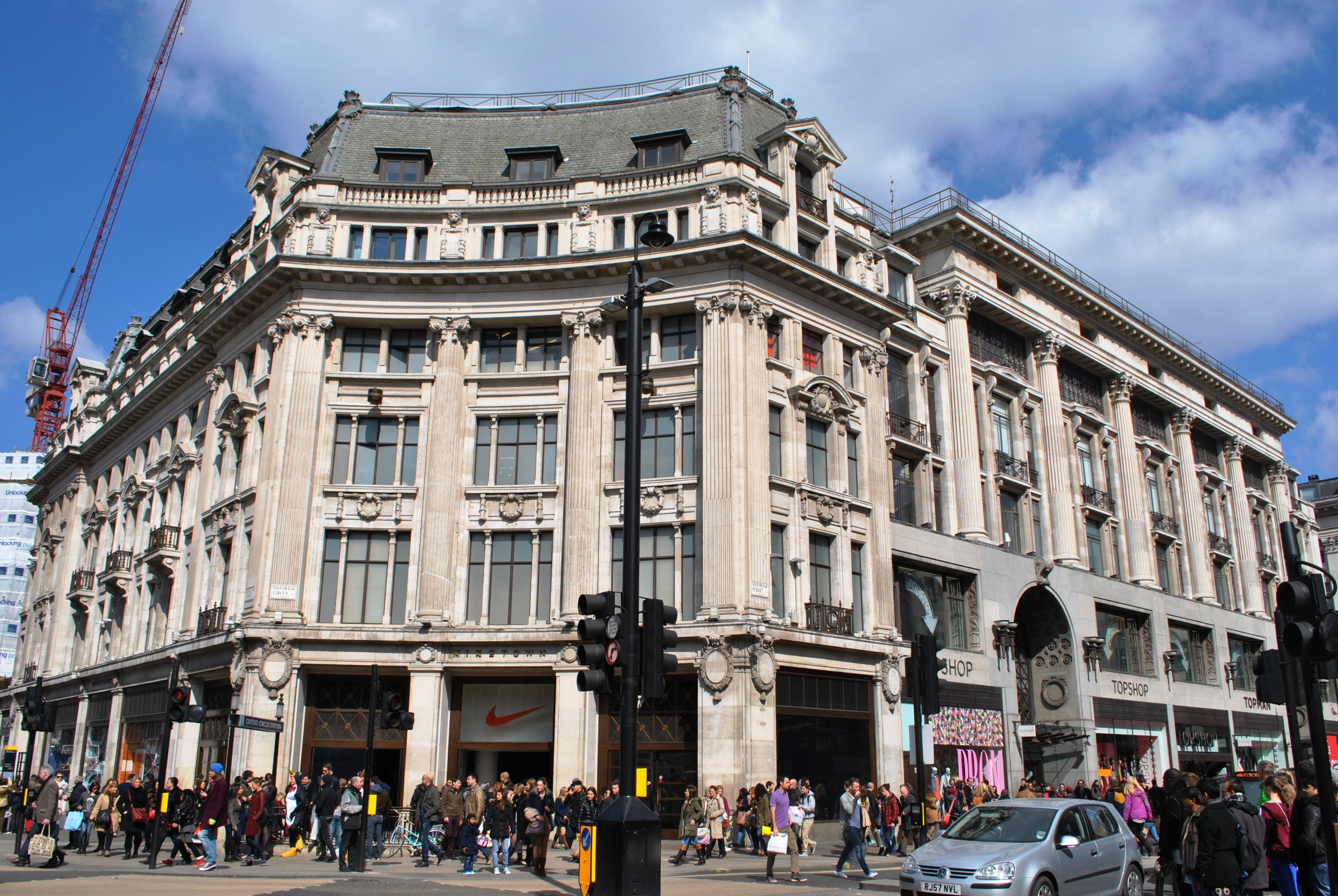
The former Peter Robinson / Topshop store adjoining Oxford Circus

Topshop was conceived in the 1960s as a youth brand for Peter Robinson, and a sizeable Topshop department was opened within the flagship store on Oxford Street (which had been rebuilt in the 1920s as part of the Oxford Circus improvements). Gradually Topshop took over more of the premises, operating alongside Peter Robinson for a time in the 1970s before the latter brand was withdrawn. It remained Topshop's flagship store until 2021 when (the parent company Arcadia having gone into administration) it closed. From 1970 to 1991, the fourth floor of this building was occupied by AIR Studios recording production facilities. Ikea announced they would open a store on the former TopShop site in 2023. However, this was later pushed back to spring 2025.

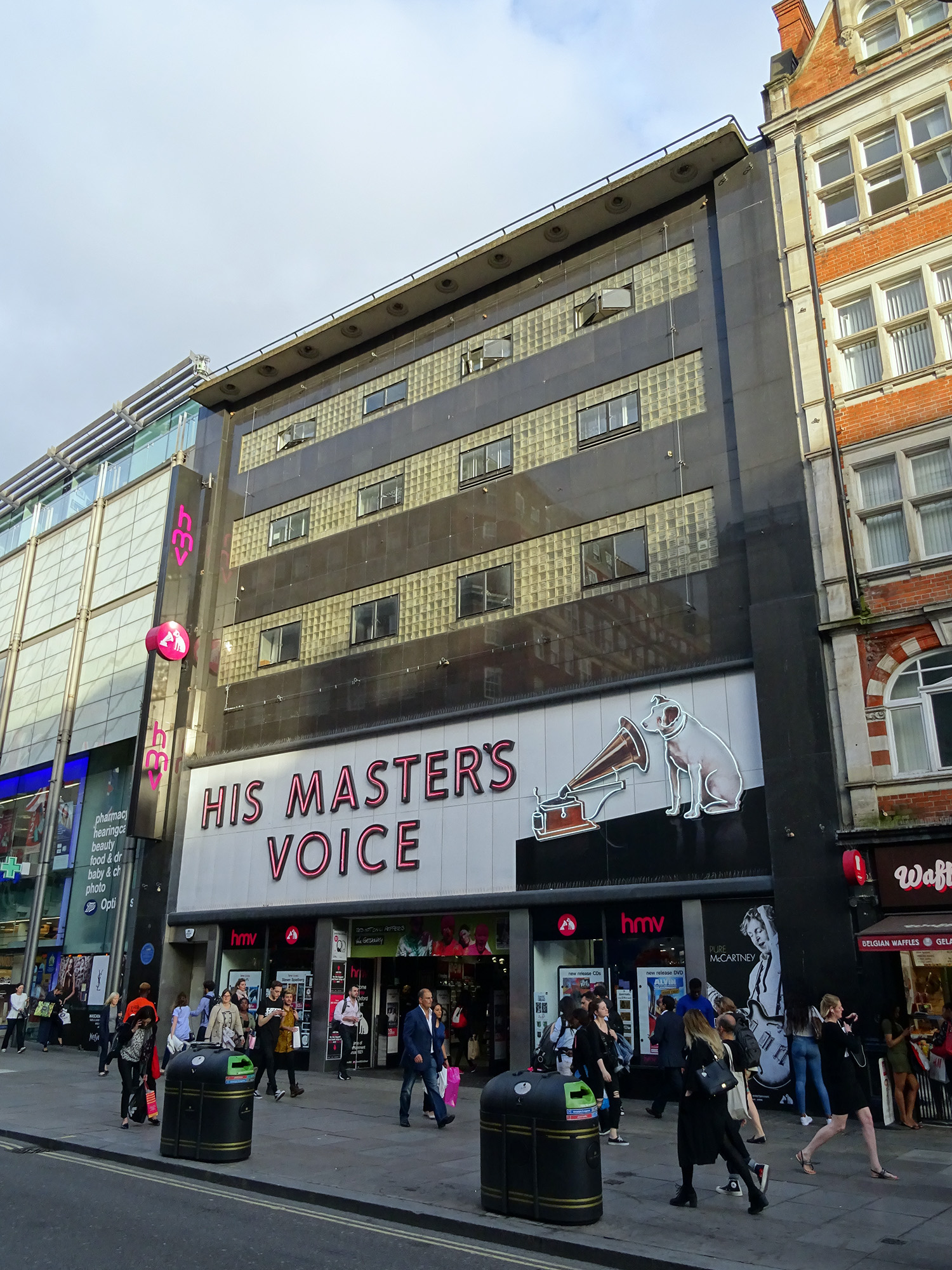
HMV at 363 Oxford Street: 'one of the architectural highlights of Oxford Street'.

The music retailer HMV was opened at No. 363 Oxford Street in 1921 by Sir Edward Elgar; the premises were twice rebuilt by Joseph Emberton in the moderne style, first in 1935 and then again in 1938–1939 (following a fire). The Beatles made their first recording in London in 1962, when they cut a 78 rpm demo disc in the store. A larger store at No. 150 (site of the old Princess's Theatre) was opened in 1986 by Bob Geldof, and was the largest music shop in the world, at 60,000 sq ft (6,000 m^{2}). As well as music and video retail, the premises supported live gigs in the store. Because of financial difficulties, the store closed in 2014, with all retail moving to No. 363 (which itself closed in 2020). In November 2023 the store at No. 363 was reopened, branded as 'The HMV Shop'.

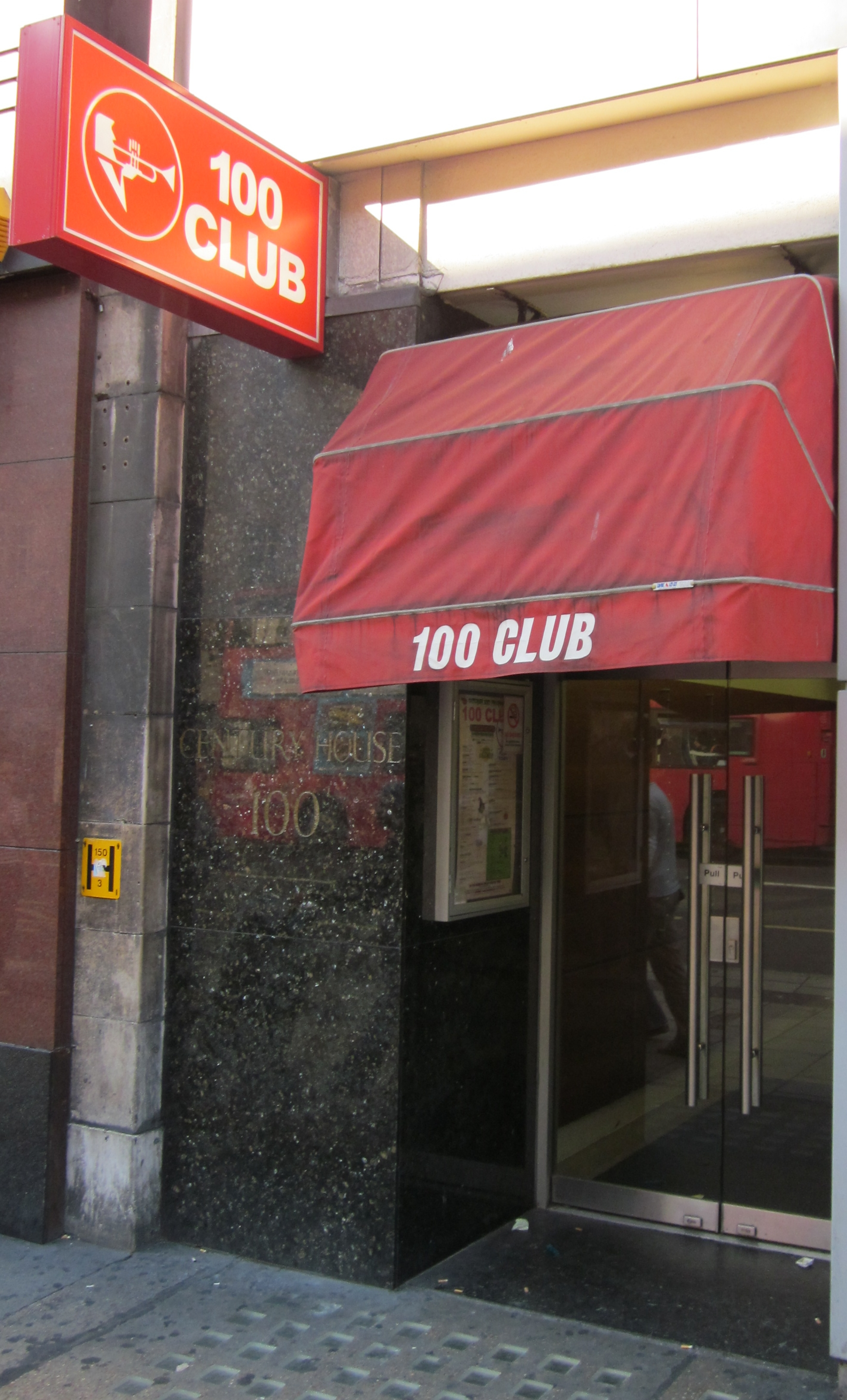
The 100 Club has been a live music venue in the basement of No. 100 Oxford Street since 1942, and has been an important venue for trad jazz and punk bands.

The 100 Club, in the basement of No. 100, has been run as a live music venue since 24 October 1942. It was thought to be safe from bombing threats because of its underground location, and played host to jazz musicians, including Glenn Miller. It was renamed the London Jazz Club in 1948, and subsequently the Humphrey Lyttelton Club after he took over the lease in the 1950s. Louis Armstrong played at the venue during this time. It became a key venue for the trad jazz revival, hosting gigs by Chris Barber and Acker Bilk. It was renamed the 100 Club in 1964 after Roger Horton bought a stake, adding an alcohol licence for the first time. The venue hosted gigs by several British rock bands, including the Who, the Kinks and the Animals. It was an important venue for punk rock in the UK and hosted the first British punk festival on 21 September 1976, featuring the Sex Pistols, the Damned and the Buzzcocks.

The Flying Horse (formerly The Tottenham) is a Grade II* listed pub at No. 6 Oxford Street, near Tottenham Court Road. It was built in the mid-19th century and is the last remaining pub in the street, which once had 20.

The London College of Fashion has an Oxford Street campus on John Prince's Street near Oxford Circus. The college is part of the University of the Arts London, formerly the London Institute.

The Salvation Army opened Regent Hall, its first Central London venue, at Nos. 275–279 Oxford Street in 1882. It served as a base for poverty relief, street missions and a Salvation Army band. Rebuilt in 1959–1960, the hall remains in Salvation Army use.

The cosmetics retailer Lush opened a store in 2015. Measuring 9,300 sq ft (860 m^{2}) and containing three floors, it is the company's largest retail premises.

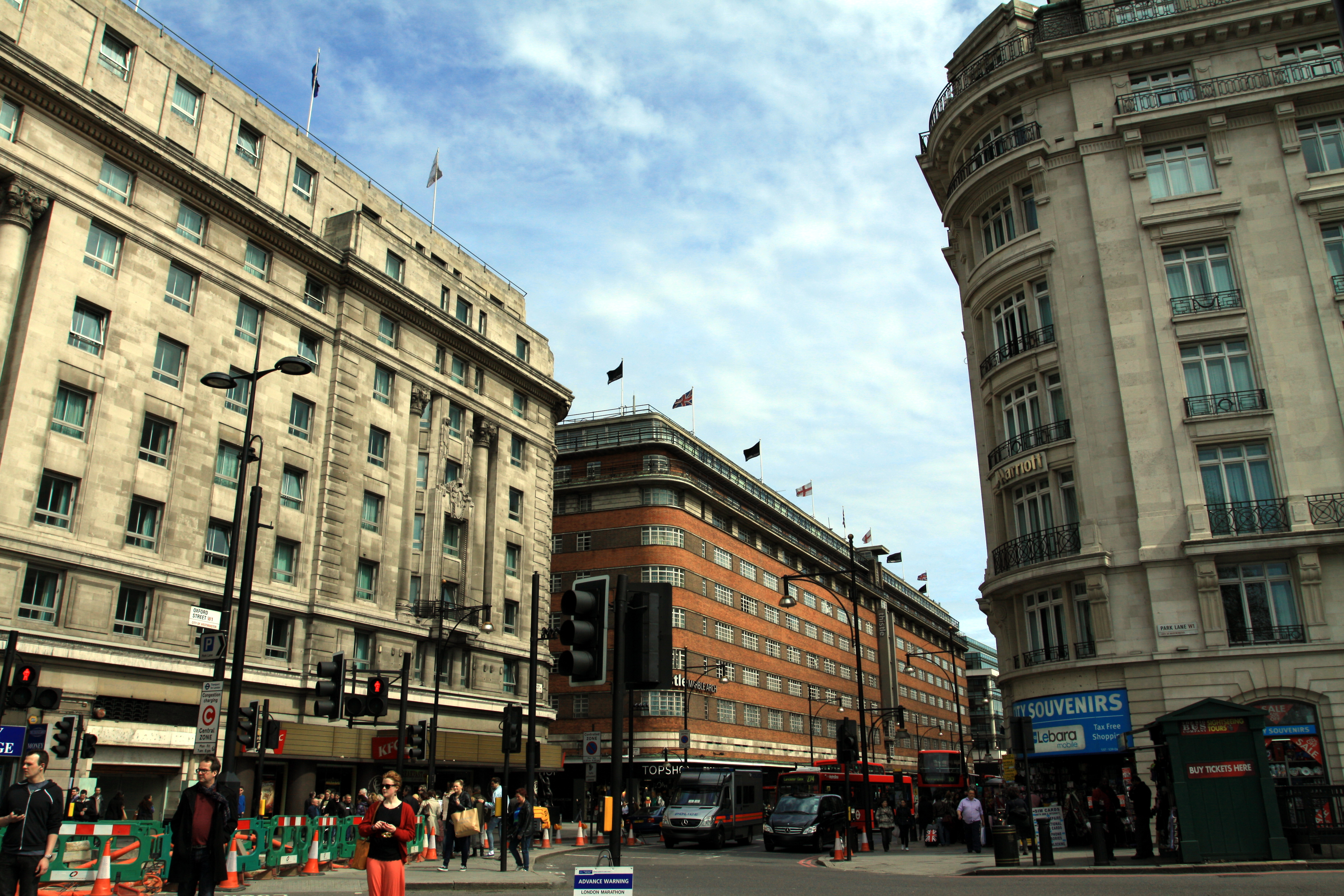
The Cumberland (left) and Mount Royal (right) hotels at the top end of Oxford Street

Two large hotels dominate the western (Marble Arch) end of the street: the red brick Mount Royal Hotel (now the Amba) was built in 1933–1934 to a design by Francis Lorne; while the Portland stone-fronted Cumberland Hotel, by F. J. Wills, opened in 1933 (it was renamed the Hard Rock Hotel in 2018).

=== Listed buildings ===
Oxford Street has several Grade II listed buildings. In addition, the façades to Oxford Circus tube station are also listed.

Number	Grade	Year listed	Description
6	II*	1987	The Flying Horse Public House
14–16	II	2009	Former Lyons Corner House of 1926–1927 by F. J. Wills.
34–36	II	1987	Built 1912
35	II	2009	Built for Richards & Co. jewellers in 1909
54–62	II	1987	Evelyn House, designed by H. Percy Adams and Charles Holden (1909).
105–109	II	1986	Built c. 1887 for the hatter Henry Heath
133–135	II	2009	Pembroke House, built 1911
147	II	2009	Built in 1897 for the chemist John Robbins.
156–162	II*	1975	Built 1906–08 for Mappin & Webb; an early example of a steel-framed structure
164–182	II	1973	Former Waring & Gillow department store
173	II	2009	The Pantheon, now Marks and Spencer
214–234	II	1973	The former Peter Robinson building at Oxford Circus
219	II	2001	Built 1951–52 and decorated with relief sculptural plaques celebrating the Festival of Britain
313	II	1975	Built c. 1870–1880
360–366	II	1987	Built 1919–1921 for Lilley & Skinner
368–370	II	2008	Early 20th-century construction with 1930s façade
400	II*	1970	Selfridges, built in stages from 1906–1928.

Gallery of listed buildings
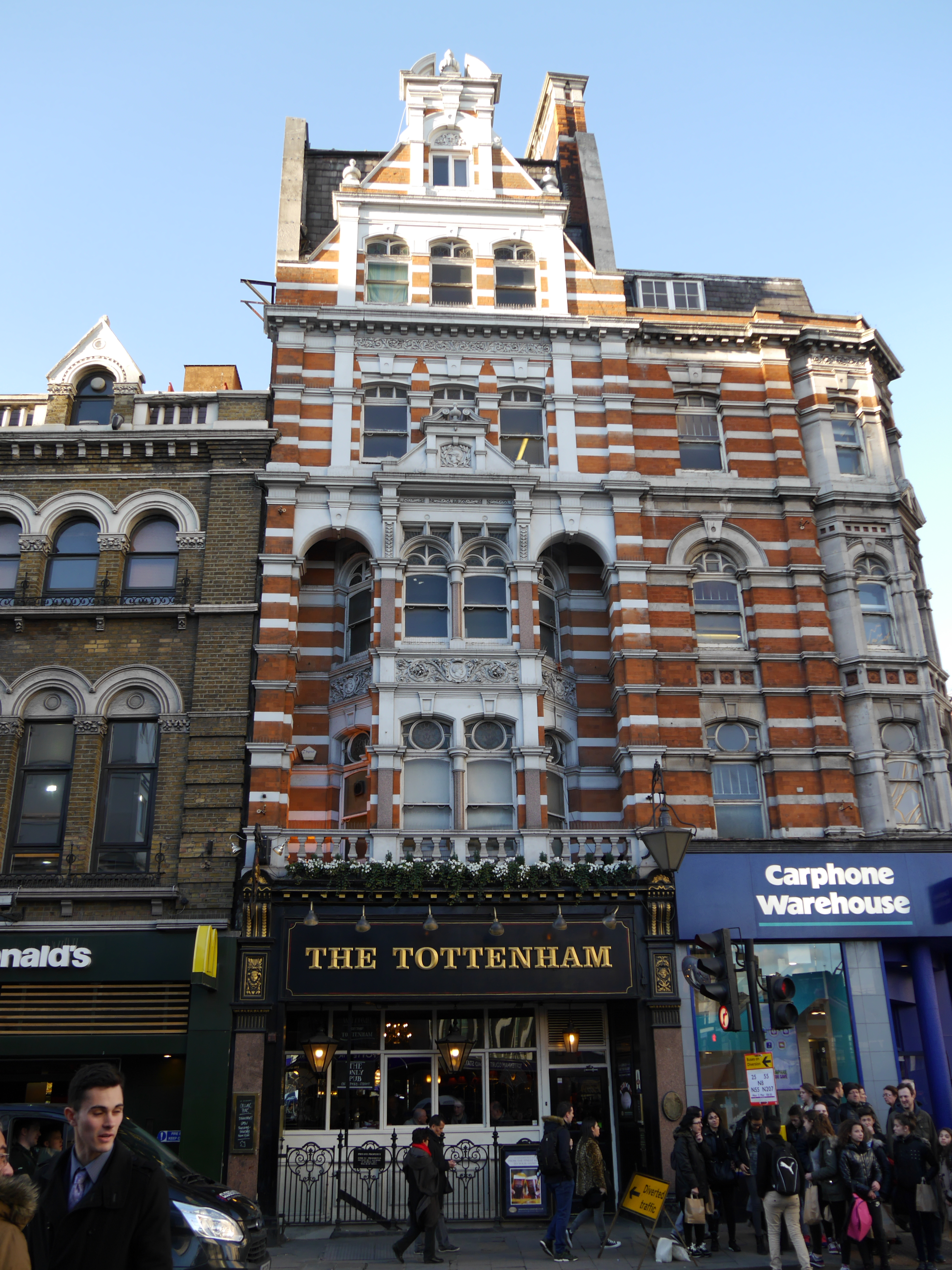
No. 6

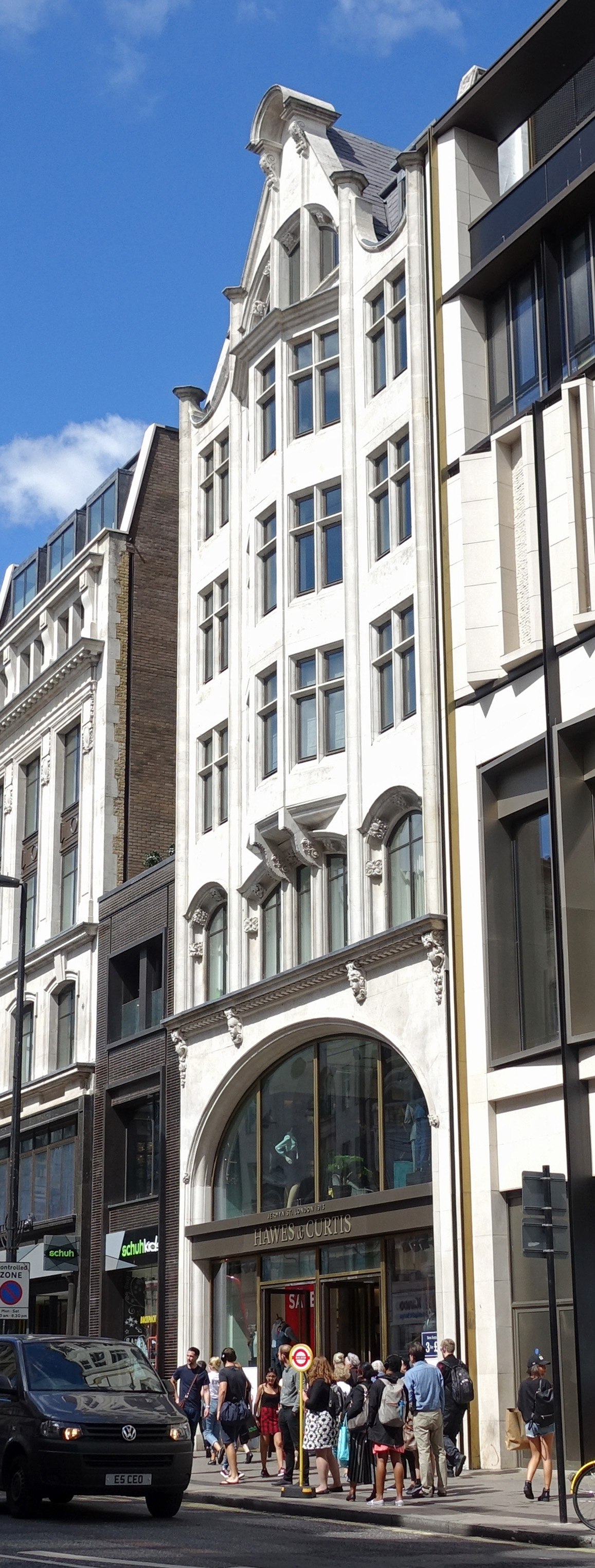
No. 34 & 36

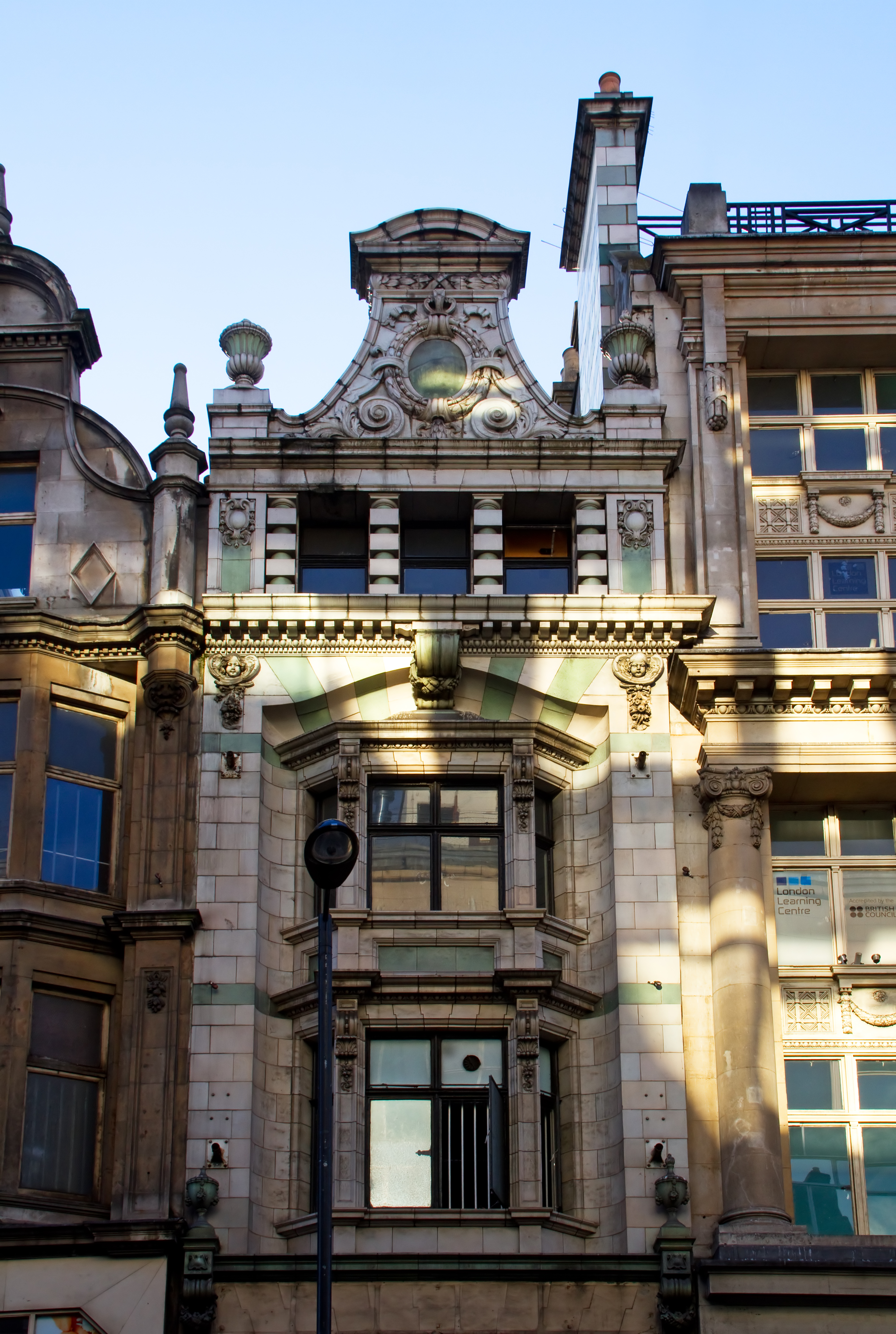
No. 35

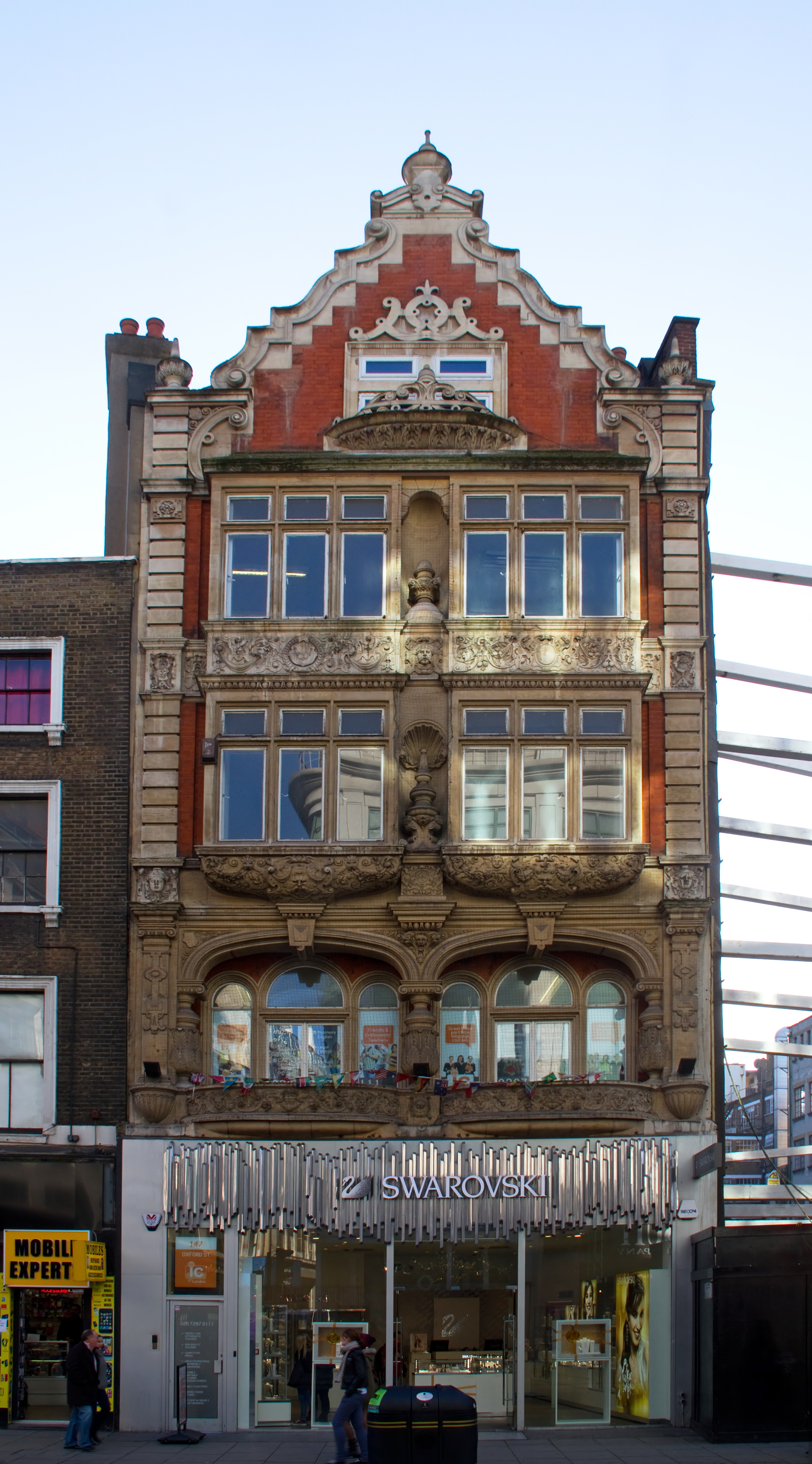
No. 147

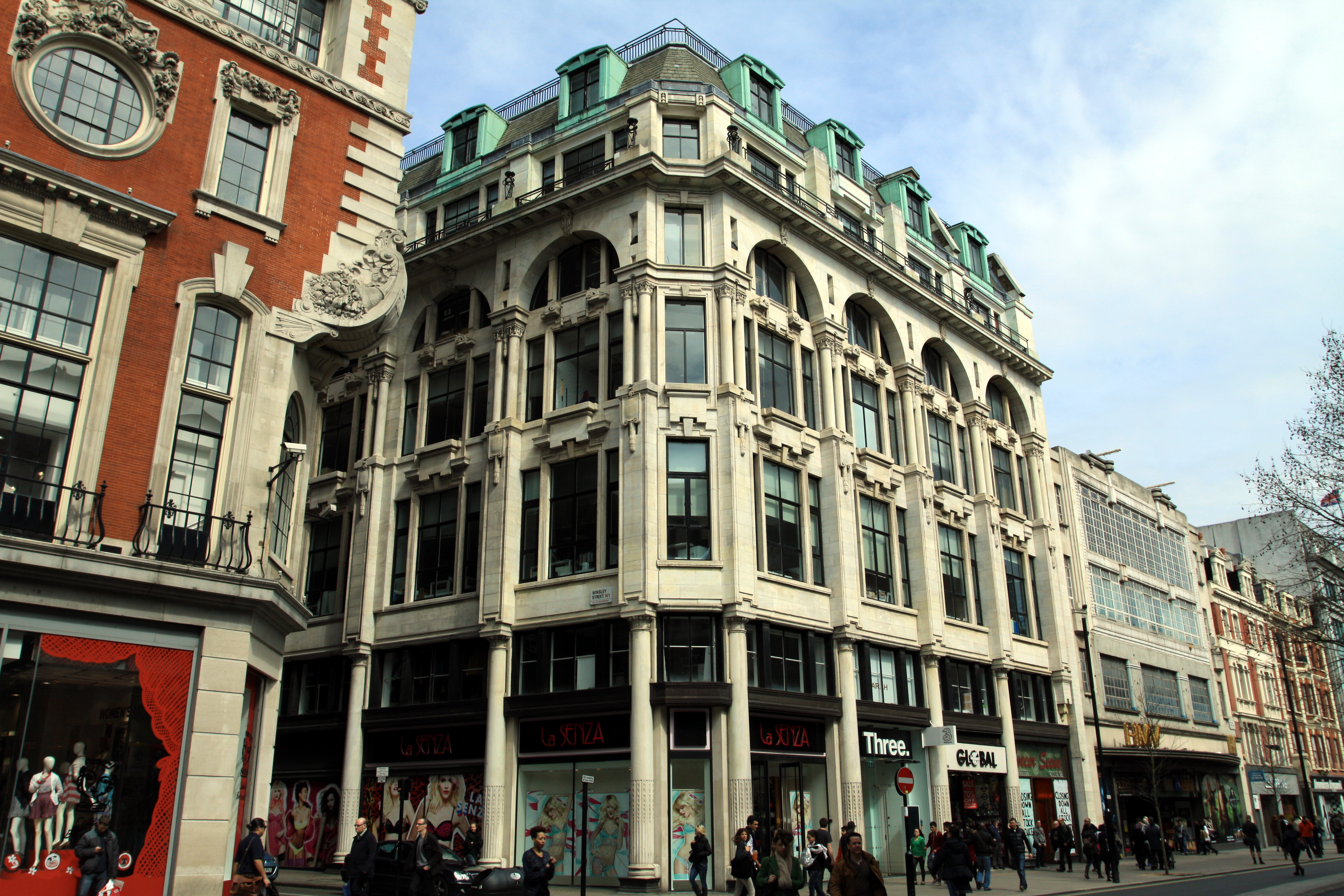
No. 156–162

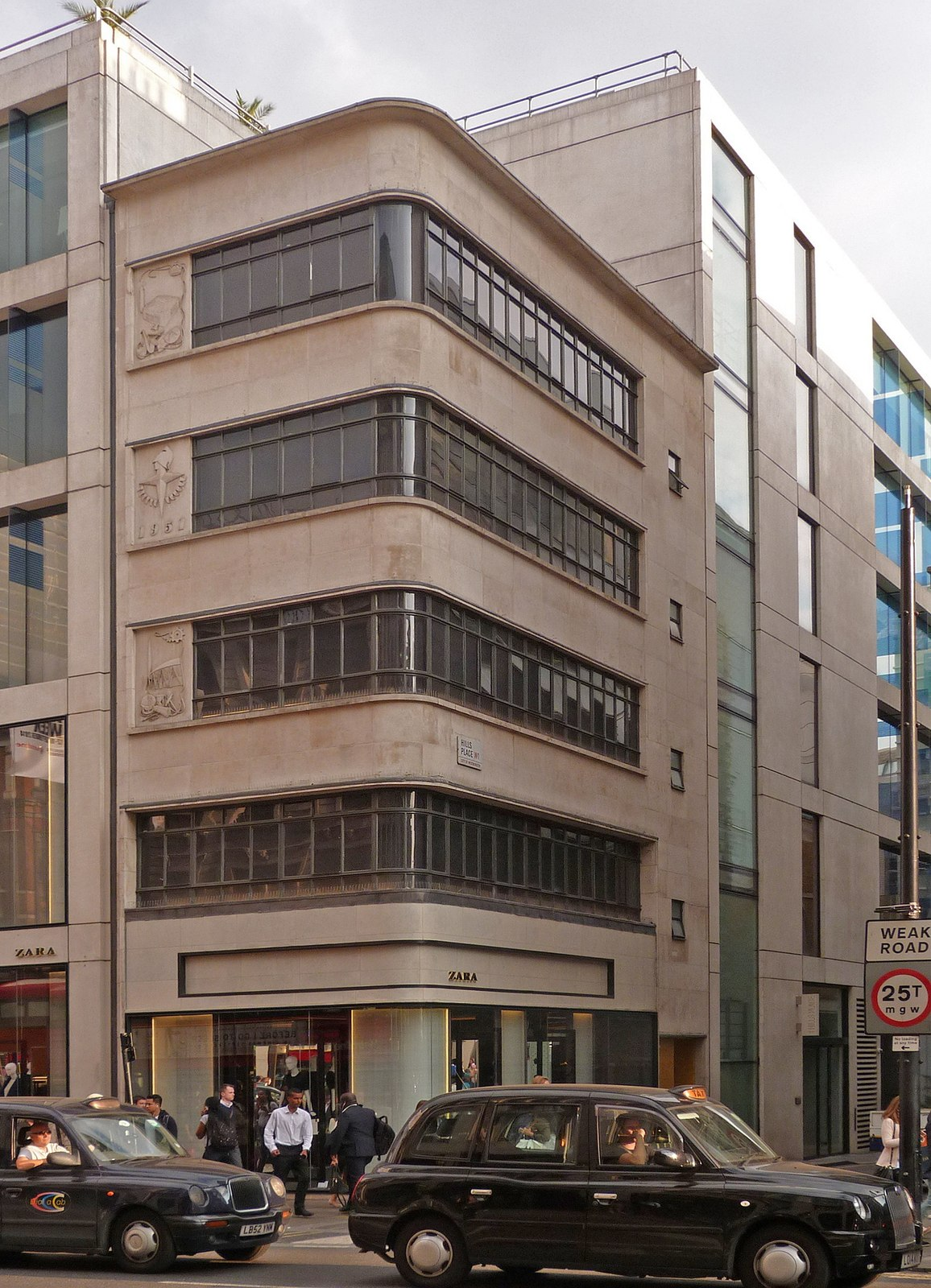
No. 219

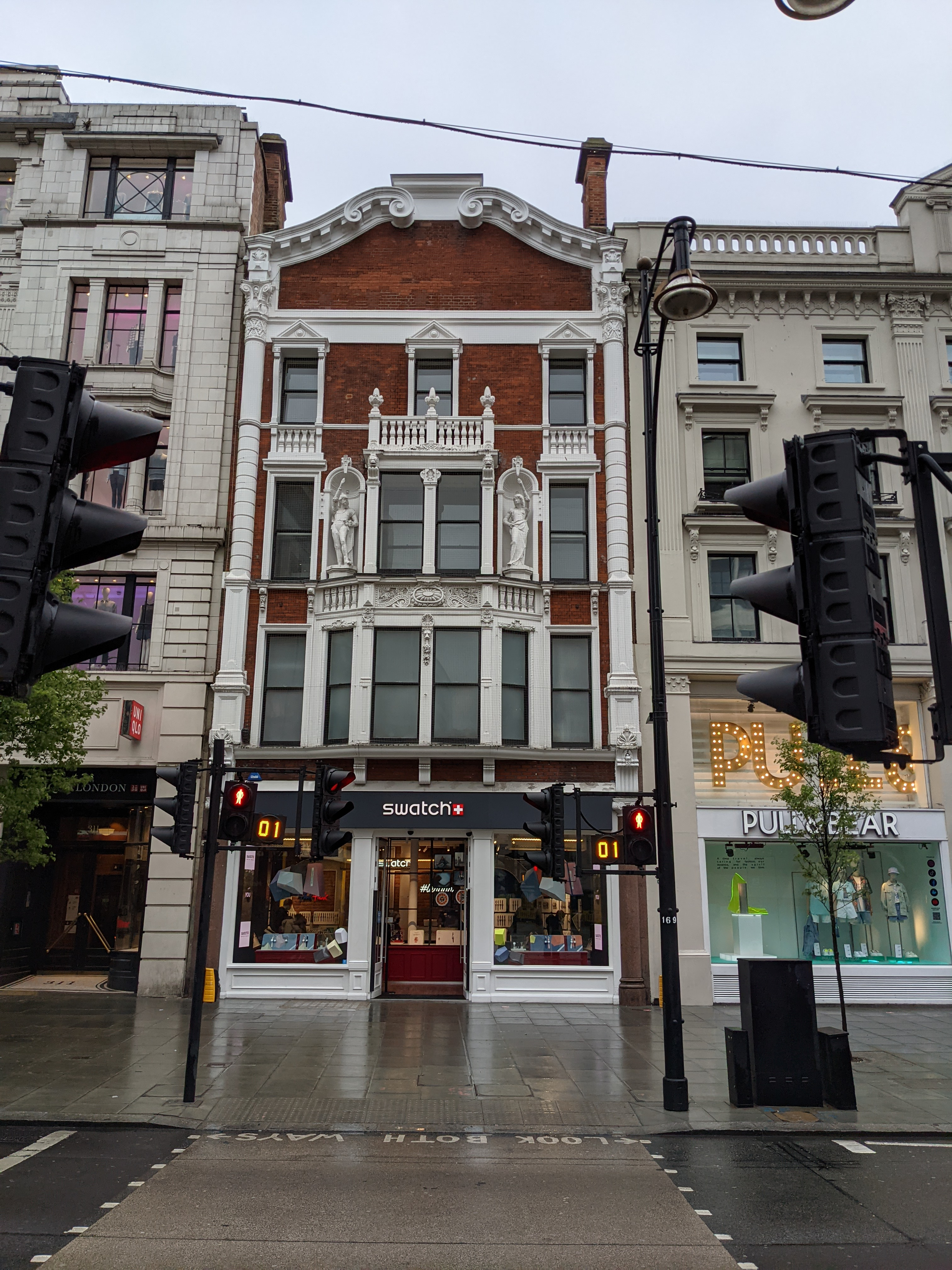
No. 313

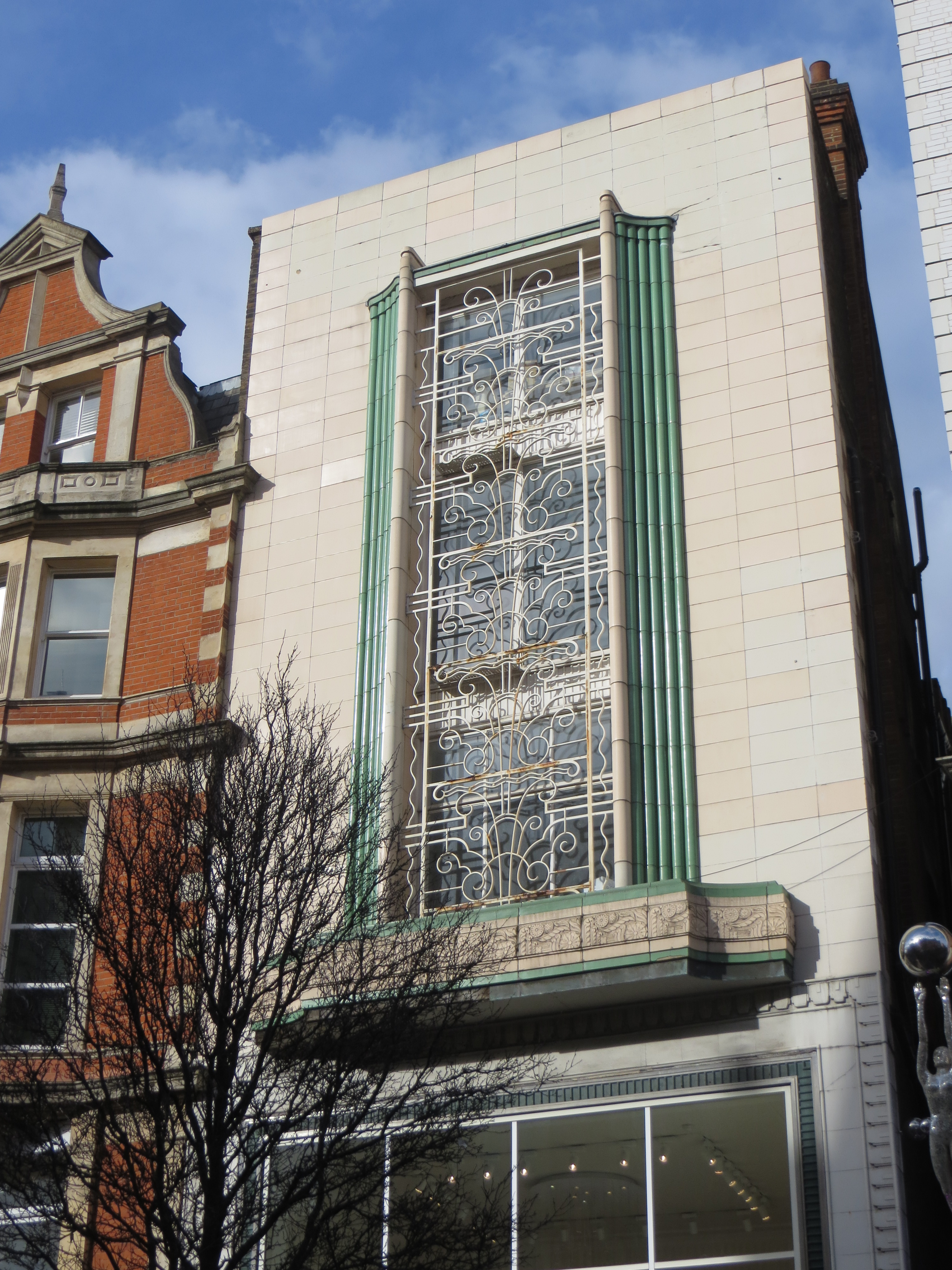
No. 368–370

== Transport links ==
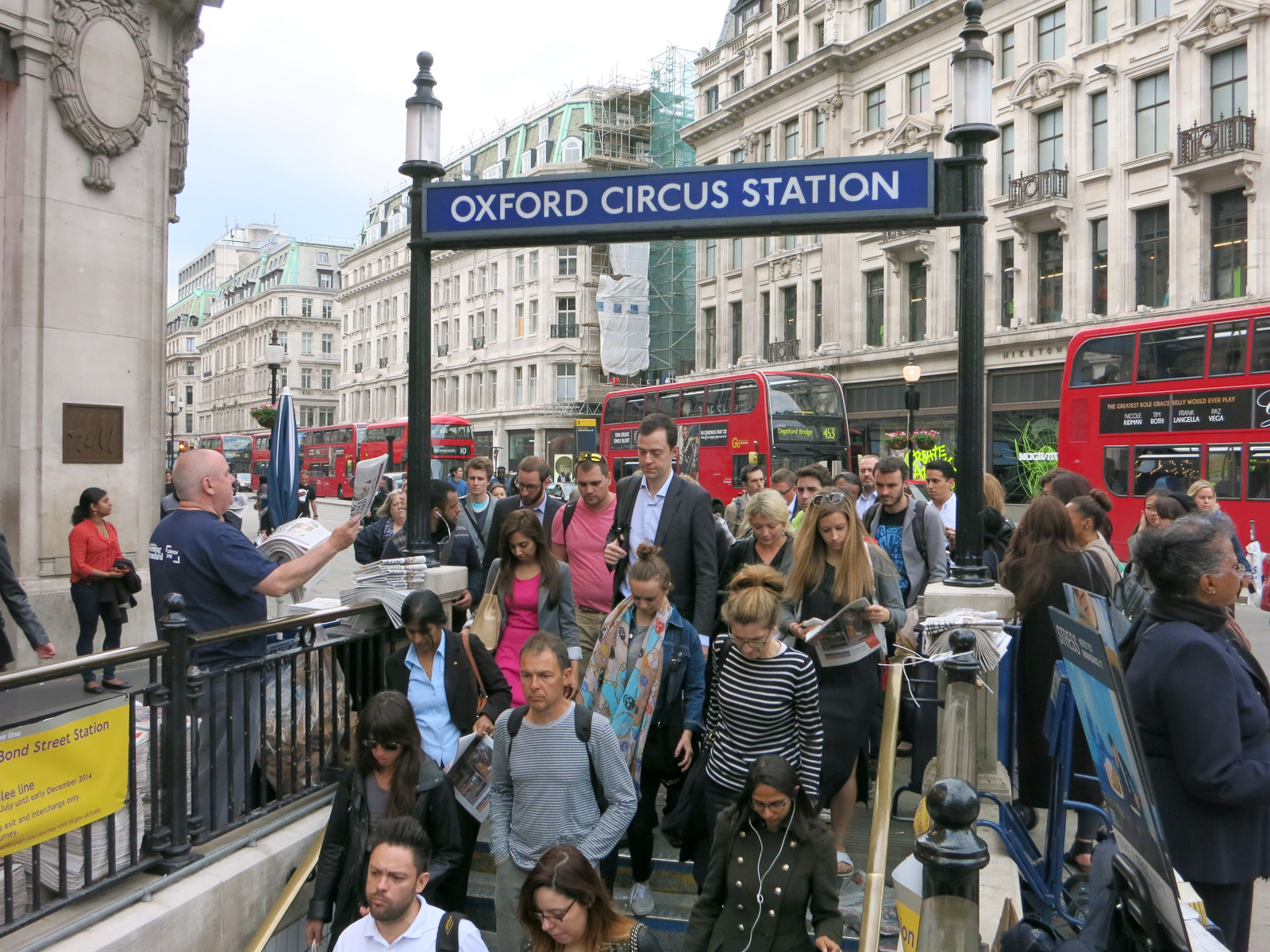
Oxford Circus tube station, one of the street's four stations

Oxford Street is served by four tube stations of the London Underground (all on the Central line). From Marble Arch eastwards, the stations are:

- Marble Arch, on the Central line.
- Bond Street, on the Central line, Jubilee line, and the Elizabeth line.
- Oxford Circus, on the Bakerloo line, Central line and Victoria line.
- Tottenham Court Road, on the Central line, Northern line and the Elizabeth line.

The four stations serve an average of 100 million passengers every year, with Oxford Circus being the busiest.

The Elizabeth line has two stations serving Oxford Street: at Bond Street and Tottenham Court Road. Each station is "double-ended", with exits through the existing tube station and also some distance away: to the east of Bond Street, in Hanover Square near Oxford Circus; to the west of Tottenham Court Road, in Dean Street.

== Traffic ==
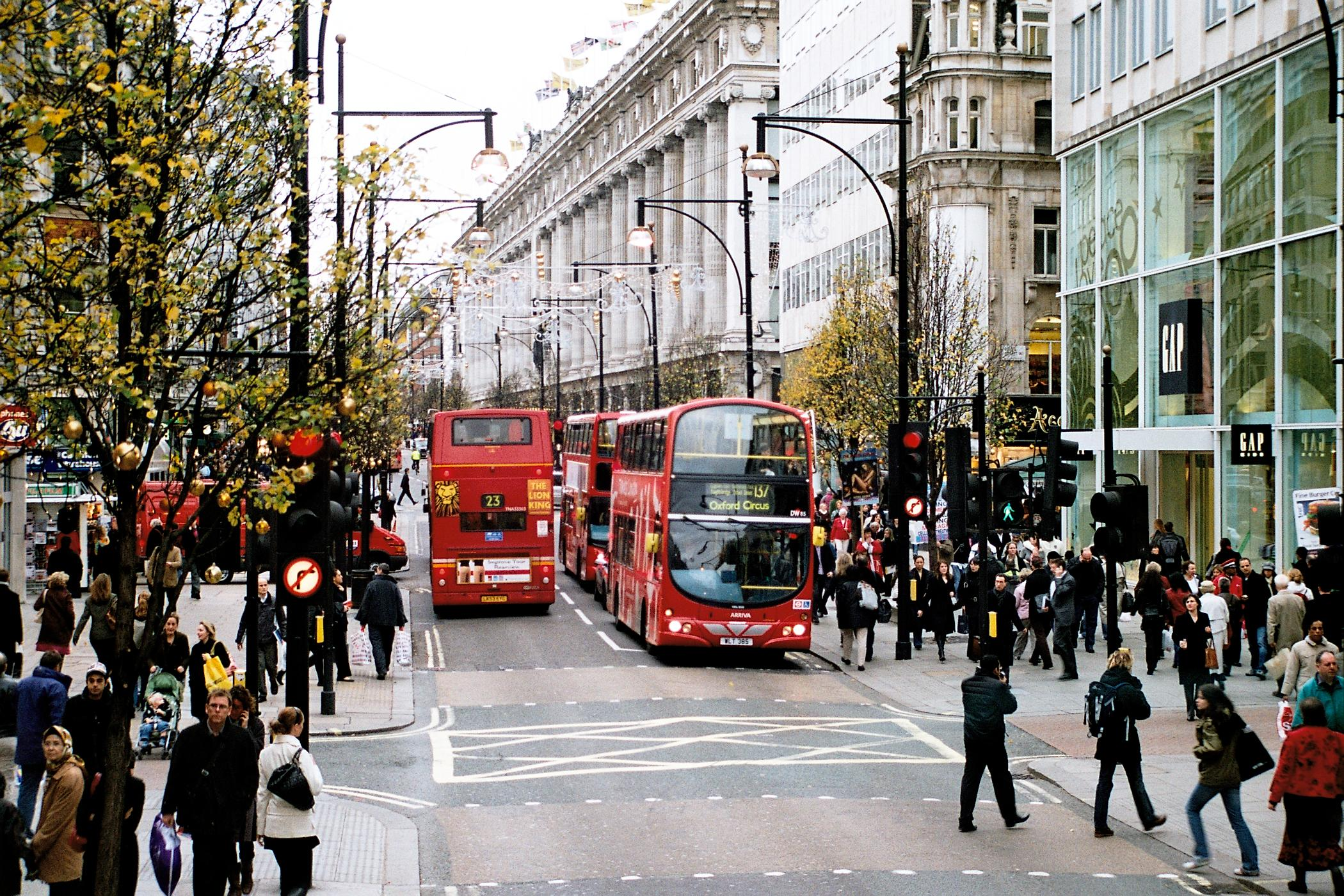
On average, half a million people visit Oxford Street every day, and foot traffic is in severe competition with buses and taxis.

Oxford Street has been ranked as the most important retail location in Britain and the busiest shopping street in Europe. The pavements are congested because of shoppers and tourists, many of whom arrive at a tube station, and the roadway is regularly blocked by buses.

There is heavy competition between foot and bus traffic on Oxford Street, which is the main east–west bus corridor through Central London. Around 175,000 people get on or off a bus on Oxford Street every day, along with 43,000 further through passengers. Taxis are popular, particularly along the stretch between Oxford Circus and Selfridges. Between 2009 and 2012, there were 71 accidents involving traffic and pedestrians. In 2016, a report suggested buses generally did not travel faster than 4.6 mph (7.4 km/h), compared to a typical pedestrian speed of 3.1 mph (5.0 km/h).

There have been several proposals to reduce congestion on Oxford Street. Horse-drawn vehicles were banned in 1931, and traffic signals were installed the same year. To prevent congestion of buses, most of Oxford Street is designated a bus lane during peak hours and private vehicles are banned. This is only open to buses, taxis and two-wheeled vehicles between 7:00am and 7:00pm on all days except Sundays.

The ban was introduced experimentally in June 1972 and was considered a success, with an estimated increase of £250,000 in retail sales. However, the area is popular with unregulated rickshaws, which are a major cause of congestion in the area. Their slow speed, coupled with the narrowness of the street (buses are unable to pass them, causing long traffic queues), only adds to the traffic woes. In 2009, a new diagonal crossing opened at Oxford Circus, allowing pedestrians to cross from one corner of Oxford Street to the opposite without needing to cross twice or use an underpass. This doubles the pedestrian capacity at the junction.

=== Pedestrianisation ===
Oxford Street before and after being closed to traffic on 25 October 2026

In 2003, Danish urban planner Jan Gehl was invited to spend 18 months analysing London's streetscape. In June 2004 he published a 120-page report entitled "Towards a Fine City for People", highlighting a lot of work that could be done to improve the city, in particular for pedestrians and children. Among his recommendations was the full pedestrianisation of Oxford Street, with a city-wide plan implemented by 2015. From 2005 to 2012, Oxford Street was closed to motor traffic on VIP Day, (Very Important Pedestrians), one Saturday before Christmas. The scheme was popular, boosting sales significantly.

In 2006, the New West End Company and the mayor of London, Ken Livingstone, proposed to pedestrianise the street with a tram service running end to end. The next mayor, Boris Johnson, elected in 2008, announced that the scheme was not cost-effective, was too disruptive and would not go ahead. In response to a request from Johnson, Transport for London (TfL) reduced bus flow by 10% in both 2009 and 2010. The New West End Company called for a 33% reduction in bus movements.

In 2013, the New West End Company announced that the VIP day would not go ahead, as it wanted to do "something new". In March 2014, TfL suggested that pedestrianisation may not be a suitable long-term measure due to Crossrail reducing the demand for bus services on the street and proposed banning all traffic except buses and cycles during peak shopping times. Optimisation of traffic signals, including pedestrian countdown signals, was also proposed. TfL was concerned that long-term traffic problems may affect trade in the area, which competes with shopping centres such as Westfield London, Westfield Stratford City and the Brent Cross Shopping Centre. In November 2014, Liberal Democrat members of the London Assembly proposed the street be pedestrianised by 2020.

In 2015, while campaigning for election as London Mayor, Labour's Sadiq Khan favoured pedestrianisation, which was supported by other parties. After winning the election, he pledged the street would be completely pedestrianised by 2020. In 2017, the project was brought forward to be completed by the end of the following year. The plan was disapproved by local stakeholders and residents and the Fitzrovia Business Association, and in 2018 Westminster City Council blocked it.

Following his re-election as mayor on 2024, Khan announced a new scheme for pedestrianisation of the street between Oxford Circus and Marble Arch. These proposals, whereby the scheme ready to be built by the City of Westminster was scrapped, drew criticism. The Oxford Street Development Corporation was established by the mayor on 1 January 2026. TfL's consultation regarding transport and highways changes to enable Oxford Street pedestrianisation closed shortly thereafter on 16 January.

Works towards pedestrianisation began at the start of September 2026, and a section of the street was closed to all vehicular traffic from 26 October. Bicycles, ebikes, and e-scooters are not allowed; the only motorised vehicles permitted are mobility scooters and emergency vehicles. The pedestrian zone stretches westwards from Great Portland Street (just east of Oxford Circus) to Orchard Street (near Selfridges), a distance of around 0.6 mi (0.97 km), which is about half of the length of the whole street. In November 2026, early data suggested that footfall and spending in shops had increased after the pedestrianisation.

== Pollution ==
In 2014, a report by a scientist at King's College London showed that Oxford Street had the world's highest concentration of nitrogen dioxide pollution, at 135 micrograms per cubic metre of air (μg/m^{3}). The figure was an average that included night-time, when traffic was much lower. At peak times during the day, levels up to 463 μg/m^{3} were recorded – over 11 times the permitted EU maximum of 40 μg/m^{3}. Because of diesel-powered traffic (buses and taxis), annual average nitrogen dioxide concentrations are around 180 μg/m^{3}. This is 4.5 times the EU target of 40 μg/m^{3} (Council Directive 1999/30/EC).

== Crime ==
Oxford Street has suffered from high crime rates. In 2005, an internal Metropolitan Police report named it as the most dangerous street in Central London. In 2012, an analysis of crime statistics revealed that Oxford Street was the shopping destination most surrounded by crime in the UK. During 2011, there were 656 vehicle crimes, 915 robberies, 2,597 violent crimes and 5,039 reported instances of anti-social behaviour.

In 2014, the United Arab Emirates issued a travel advisory, warning Emirati citizens to avoid Oxford Street and other areas of Central London such as Bond Street and Piccadilly due to "pickpocketing, fraud and theft". The advent of closed-circuit television has reduced the area's attraction to scam artists and illegal street traders.

In 2021, police seized 17,500 items including fake designer goods, unsafe toys and incorrectly-labelled nicotine products as part of Operation Jade. 4,000 items were removed from an unregistered food trader, including two bags with a quantity of Tetrahydrocannabinol over the legal limit. Trading Standards also took 11,000 goods and 2,500 souvenirs from unlicensed businesses and street traders.

In 2023, Oxford Street received much attention in the media over a number of import candy shops which had moved in, with it being alleged that the businesses were front companies for organised crime, particularly money laundering. Efforts by Westminster City Council in curtailing the shops' operations were also highlighted, as it was found that many of the businesses implicated had been engaging in tax evasion by refusing to pay the local business rate. Westminster City Council conducted raids on several businesses, with at least 24 under active investigation for fraud and money laundering.

== Christmas lights ==
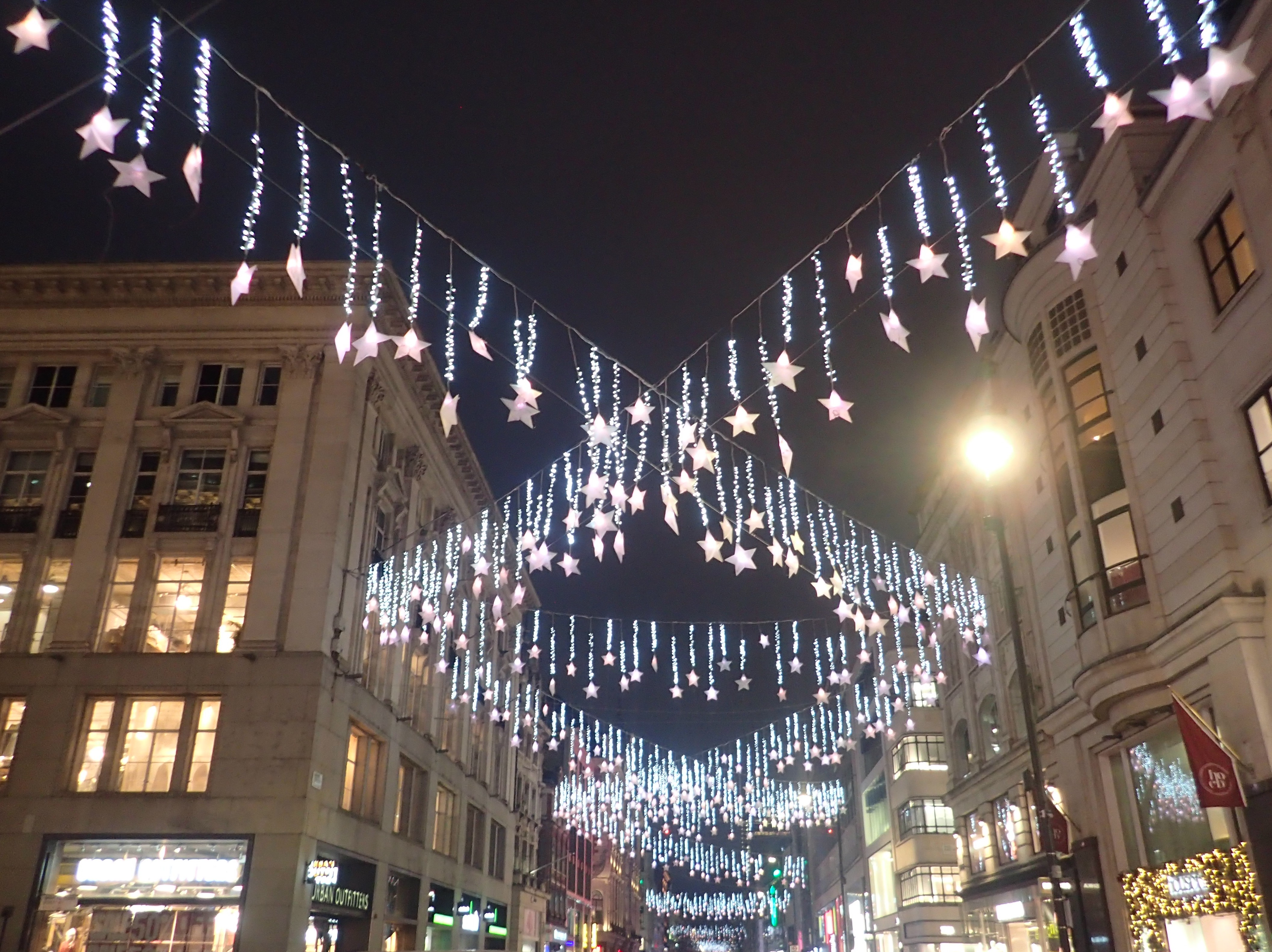
The 2025 Oxford Street Christmas lights

Every Christmas, Oxford Street is decorated with festive lights. The tradition of Christmas lights began in 1959, five years after neighbouring Regent Street. There were no light displays in 1976 or 1977 because of economic recession, but the lights returned in 1978 when Oxford Street organised a laser display, and have continued every year since.

In order to fund the Christmas lights, the displays have often been themed with promotional tie-ins with both commercial and charity partners. For example, Marmite sponsored the displays in 2012, and the NSPCC and Sky Cinema were partners for the 2016 and 2017 Christmas displays. In 2020, the lights honoured volunteers who had helped London residents through the ongoing COVID-19 pandemic. In 2026, it was announced that the Christmas lights that year would be Harry Potter themed to promote the airing of the HBO Harry Potter TV series, and the opening of a new Harry Potter flagship store on the street. In response, a petition was launched by the Good Law Project calling on Khan to cancel the display, noting that promoting work by J. K. Rowling, who has caused controversy over her views on transgender people, ran contrary to previous statements made by the Mayor that "trans rights are human rights" and that "London will remain a safe, welcoming city for trans people".

Current practice involves a celebrity turning the lights on in mid- to late-November, and the lights remain until 6 January (Twelfth Night). The festivities were postponed in 1963 because of the assassination of John F. Kennedy and in 1989 to fit with Kylie Minogue's touring commitments. In 2015, the lights were switched on earlier, on Sunday 1 November, resulting in an unusual closure of the street to all traffic.

== Cultural references ==
De Quincey refers to "Oxford-street" as a "stony hearted step-mother" in Confessions of an English Opium-Eater (1821), the first part of which is set there.

Oxford Street is mentioned in several Charles Dickens novels. In A Tale of Two Cities, as Oxford Road, it is described as having "very few buildings", though it was heavily built up by the late 18th century. It is also mentioned in Sketches by Boz and Bleak House.

Oxford Street is one of the London poet Letitia Elizabeth Landon's Scenes in London. In this poem the busy bustle of commercial life is interrupted by and contrasted with the procession of a military funeral.

The street is a square on the British Monopoly game board, part of the green set (together with Regent Street and Bond Street). The streets were grouped together as they are all primarily retail areas.

"Oxford St, W1", the B-side to the Television Personalities' 1978 debut single "14th Floor", refers to the street. In 1991, music manager and entrepreneur Malcolm McLaren produced The Ghosts of Oxford Street, a musical documentary about life and history in the local area.

== See also ==
- List of eponymous roads in London
- Somerset House (demolished 1915), on the corner of Oxford Street and Park Lane

== Bibliography ==
- Bracken, G. Byrne (2011). Walking Tour London: Sketches of the city's architectural treasures ... Marshall Cavendish. ISBN 978-981-4435-36-9.
- Glinert, Ed (2012). The London Compendium. Penguin. ISBN 978-0-7181-9204-4.
- Green, Oliver (1987). The London Underground: An Illustrated History. Ian Allan. ISBN 0-7110-1720-4.
- Weinreb, Ben; Hibbert, Christopher; Keay, John; Keay, Julia, eds. (2008) [1983]. The London Encyclopaedia (Third ed.). Macmillan. ISBN 978-1-405-04924-5.
- Hayward, Arthur (2013). The Dickens Encyclopaedia. Routledge. ISBN 978-1-135-02758-2.
- Inwood, Stephen (2012). Historic London: An Explorer's Companion. Pan Macmillan. ISBN 978-0-230-75252-8.
- Kronenburg, Robert (2013). Live Architecture: Venues, Stages and Arenas for Popular Music. Routledge. ISBN 978-1-135-71916-6.
- Moore, Tim (2003). Do Not Pass Go. Vintage. ISBN 978-0-09-943386-6.
- Piper, David; Jervis, Fionnuala (2002). The Companion Guide to London. Companion Guides. ISBN 978-1-900639-36-1.
- Sullivan, Edward (2000). Evening Standard London Pub Bar Guide 1999. Simon and Schuster. ISBN 978-0-684-86840-0.
- Swinnerton, Jo (2004). The London Companion. Robson Books. p. 24. ISBN 978-1-86105-799-0. "esther rantzenoxford street christmas lights."
- London's street family: Theory and case studies (PDF) (Report). Transport for London. 2014. p. 138. Archived (PDF) from the original on 28 March 2014.
