= United Kingdom House =

Building on Oxford Street, London, England

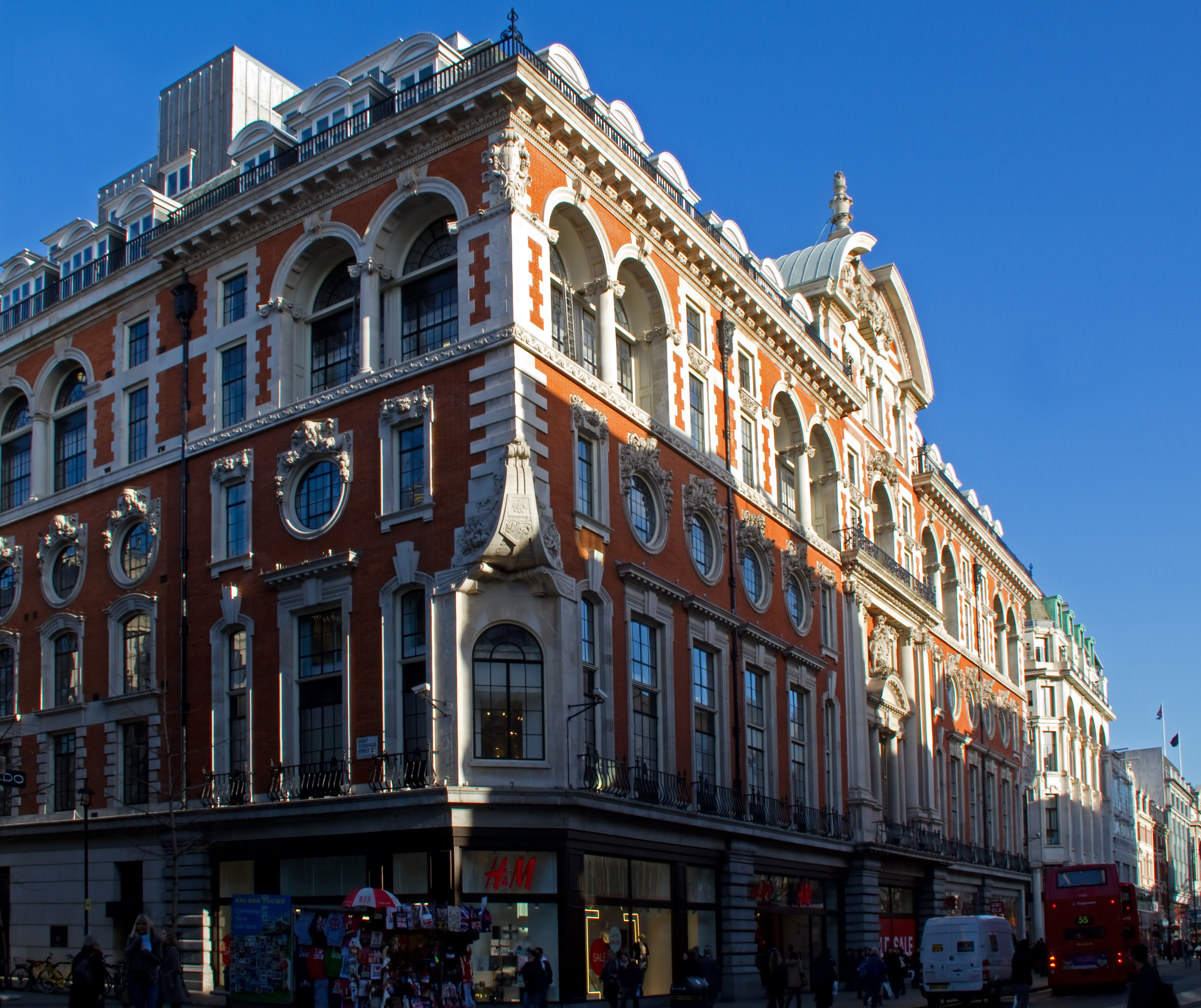

General information
- Architectural style: Edwardian Baroque
- Location: City of Westminster, England
- Coordinates: 51°30′57″N 0°8′20″W
- Construction started: 1905–06

Design and construction
- Architect: Frank Atkinson
- Awards: Listed as Grade II by Historic England

United Kingdom House at 164–182 Oxford Street in the City of Westminster, London, is a grade II listed former Waring and Gillow's department store completed in 1906 to the design of Frank Atkinson with advice from Richard Norman Shaw. It is now used as retail and offices premises.

== History ==
In 1895, S. J. Waring established a branch on Oxford Street at the current site of United Kingdom House. Following the expiration of the lease on the Gillow's location near Marble Arch, where the company had been trading since c. 1765, the two companies merged.

Work began on the current building in 1901 to the design of Frank Atknison and would first open in 1906. An extension on Great Titchfield Street would be completed in 1933. The upper levels of the building would be converted into offices by R. Seifert and Partners between 1977 and 1978.
