= R. Frank Atkinson =

British architect (1869–1923)

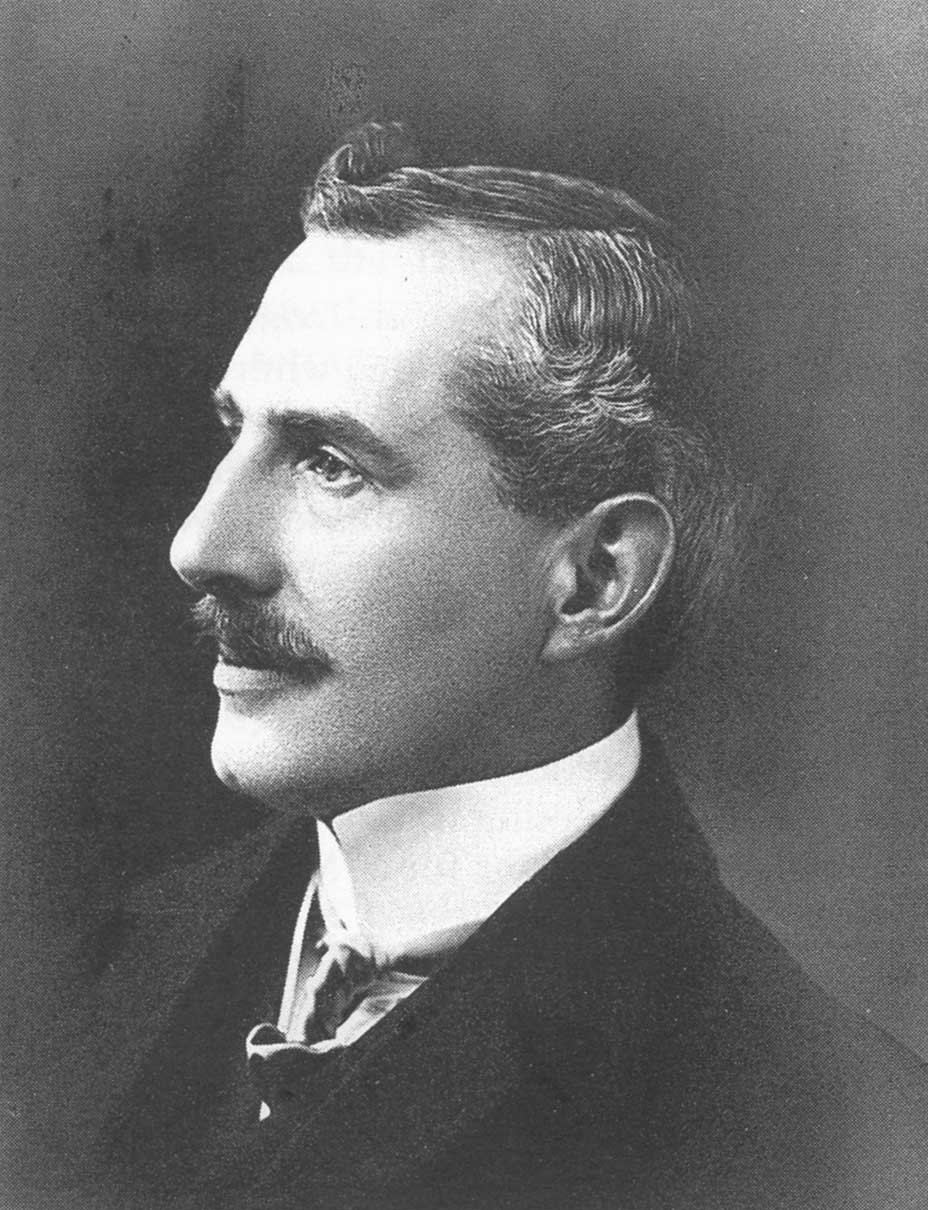
R. Frank Atkinson in 1912

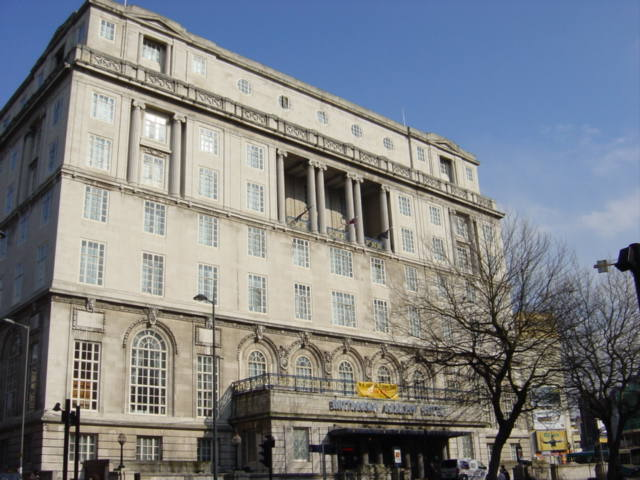
Adelphi Hotel, Liverpool

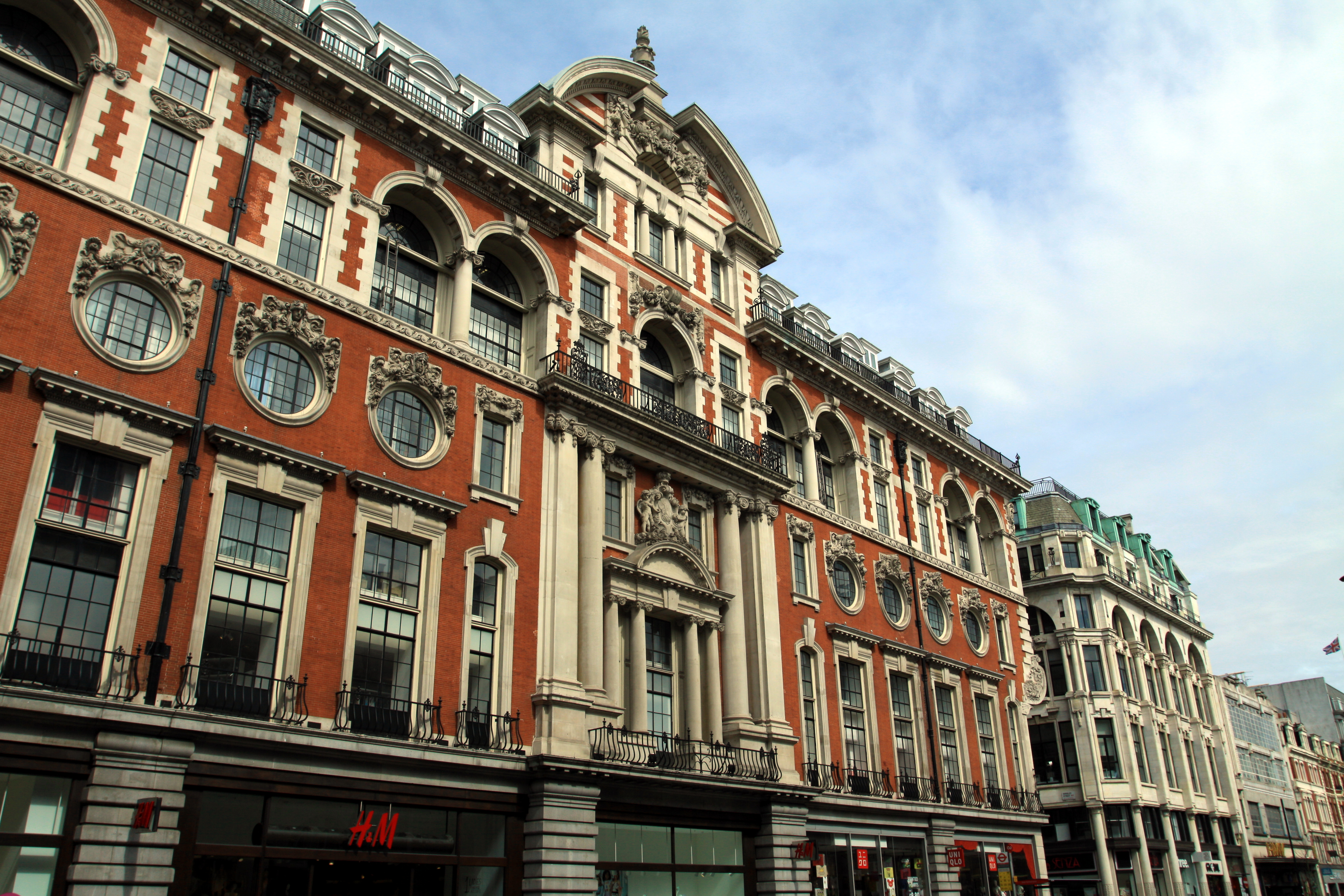
Waring & Gillow's former department store, Oxford Street, London

Robert Frank Atkinson (1869 – 15 June 1923) was a British architect.

== Career ==
Atkinson was born in Liverpool and began his career as an articled apprentice to John Francis Doyle in the same city. He remained as Doyle's assistant for 6 years after completing his apprenticeship, before opening his own office in Liverpool in 1897, and in London in 1901. At his London office he had as an assistant Robert Atkinson (no known relation) who went on to become a famous architect. He died on 15 June 1923 in Leeds.

== Notable works ==
Atkinson designed the Waring & Gillow department store at 164–182 Oxford Street. It was built in 1905–06 and was made a Grade II listed building in 1973.

In 1907, Atkinson collaborated with the Chicago architect Daniel H. Burnham on the design of the steel-framed Selfridges store in London.

In 1912 six leading architects of the day were chosen to submit designs for Whiteley Village, Surrey, by the trustees of Whiteley Homes. Each architect received £50 for the plans they submitted. The winning architect was Atkinson, who received a prize of £150. Although a number of his original designs were altered because of cost, his distinctive octagonal "spider's web" design for the central portion of the village was retained.

Also in 1912 Atkinson designed the Adelphi Hotel in Liverpool for the Midland Railway Company. On its opening in 1914 it was described as "the world's most palatial hotel" and is still the city's largest hotel.
