= William Cavendish-Bentinck, 3rd Duke of Portland =

Prime Minister of the United Kingdom from 1807 to 1809

His Grace The Duke of Portland KG PC FRS
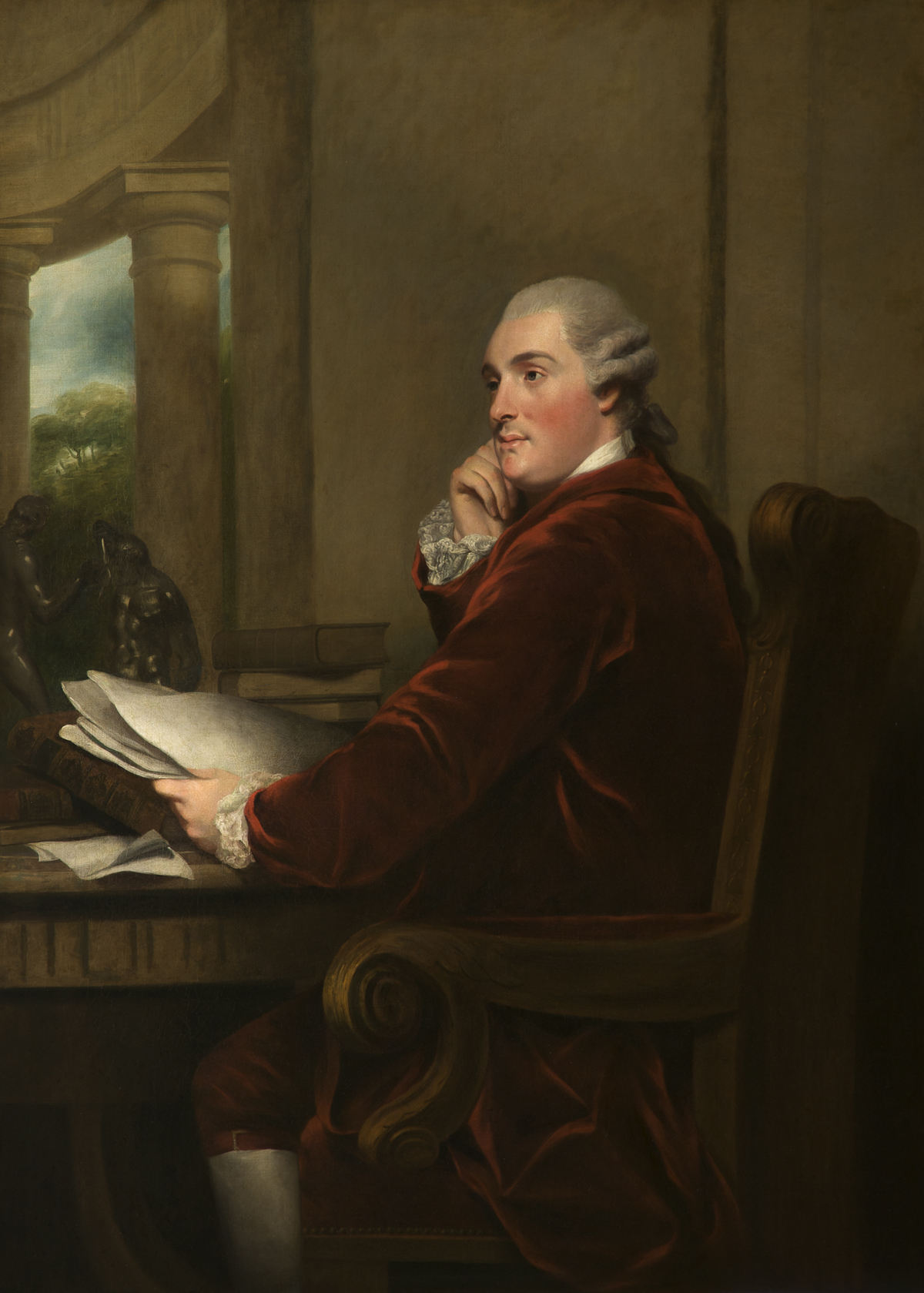
- Portrait by John Powell, c. 1782

Prime Minister of the United Kingdom
- In office 31 March 1807 – 4 October 1809
- Monarch: George III
- Preceded by: The Lord Grenville
- Succeeded by: Spencer Perceval

Prime Minister of Great Britain
- In office 2 April 1783 – 18 December 1783
- Monarch: George III
- Preceded by: The Earl of Shelburne
- Succeeded by: William Pitt the Younger

Lord President of the Council
- In office 30 July 1801 – 14 January 1805
- Prime Minister: Henry Addington; William Pitt the Younger
- Preceded by: The Earl of Chatham
- Succeeded by: The Viscount Sidmouth

Home Secretary
- In office 11 July 1794 – 30 July 1801
- Prime Minister: William Pitt the Younger
- Preceded by: Henry Dundas
- Succeeded by: Lord Pelham

Leader of the House of Lords
- In office 2 April 1783 – 18 December 1783
- Prime Minister: Himself
- Preceded by: The Earl of Shelburne
- Succeeded by: The Earl Temple

Lord Lieutenant of Ireland
- In office 8 April 1782 – 15 August 1782
- Prime Minister: The Earl of Shelburne
- Preceded by: The Earl of Carlisle
- Succeeded by: The Earl Temple

Lord Chamberlain of the Household
- In office 1765–1766
- Monarch: George III
- Preceded by: The Earl Gower
- Succeeded by: The Earl of Hertford

Personal details
- Born: 14 April 1738 Bulstrode Park, Gerrards Cross, Buckinghamshire, England
- Died: 30 October 1809 (aged 71) Westminster, England
- Resting place: St Marylebone Parish Church
- Party: Whig (Foxite) (1761–1794); Tory (Pittite) (1794–1809)
- Spouse: Lady Dorothy Cavendish (m. 1766; died 1794)
- Children: 6, including: William Cavendish-Scott-Bentinck, 4th Duke of Portland; Lord William Cavendish-Bentinck; Lord Charles Cavendish-Bentinck; Lord Frederick Bentinck
- Parents: William Bentinck, 2nd Duke of Portland; Margaret Cavendish-Harley
- Education: Christ Church, Oxford

William Henry Cavendish Cavendish-Bentinck, 3rd Duke of Portland (14 April 1738 – 30 October 1809) was a British Whig and later Tory politician during the late Georgian era. He served as chancellor of the University of Oxford (1792–1809) and as Prime Minister of Great Britain (1783) and then of the United Kingdom (1807–1809). The gap of 23 years between his two terms as prime minister is the longest of any British prime minister. He is also an ancestor of Queen Elizabeth II and King Charles III, through his great-granddaughter Cecilia Bowes-Lyon, Countess of Strathmore and Kinghorne.

Portland was known before 1762 by the courtesy title Marquess of Titchfield. He held a title for every degree of British nobility: duke, marquess, earl (Earl of Portland), viscount (Viscount Woodstock), and baron (Baron Cirencester). He was the leader of the Portland Whigs faction, which broke with the Whig leadership of Charles James Fox and joined with William Pitt the Younger in the wake of the French Revolution.

== Early life and education ==
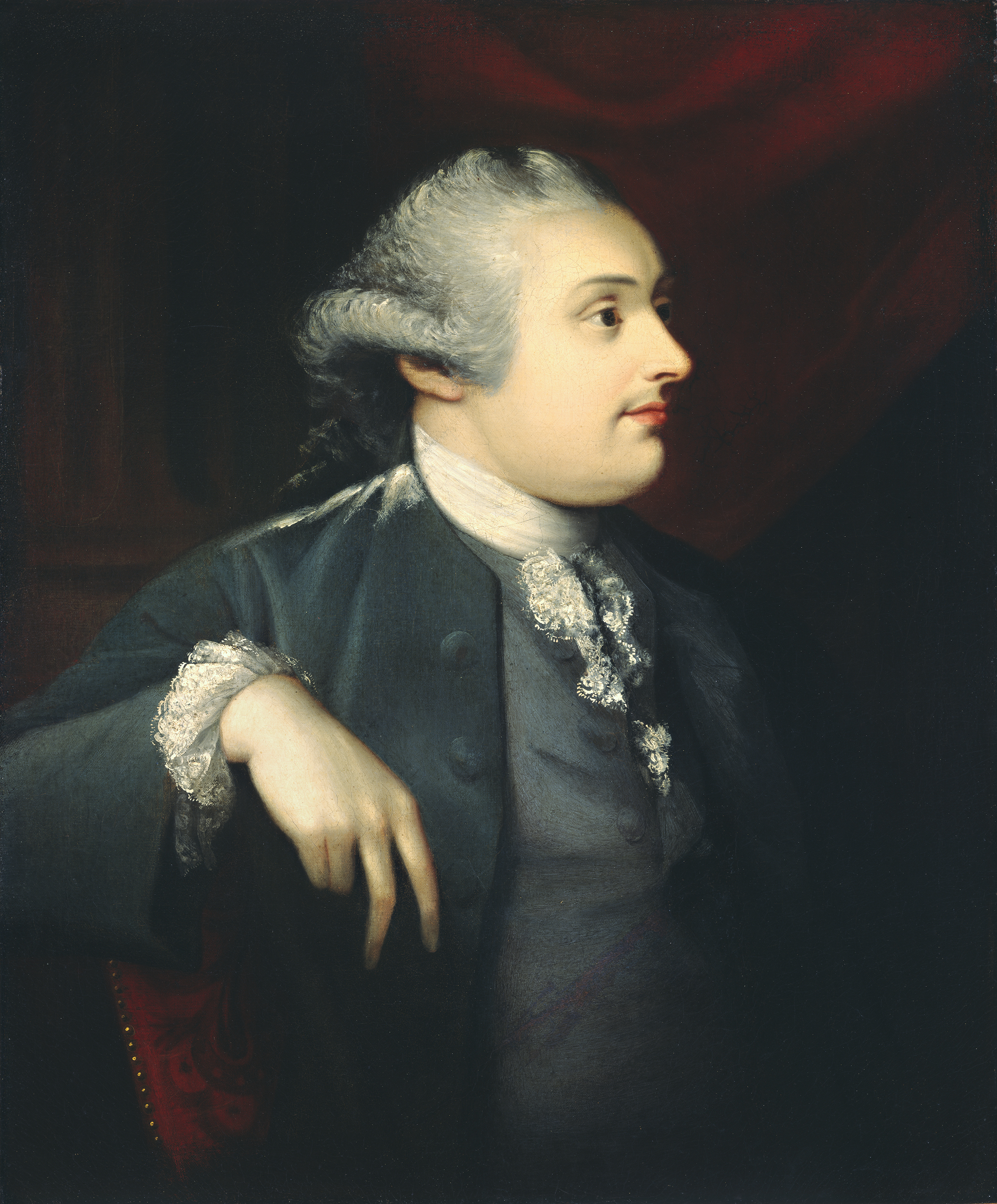
3rd Duke of Portland, by Matthew Pratt, c. 1774

William Henry, Lord Titchfield, was born on 14 April 1738 at Bulstrode Park in Buckinghamshire. He was the eldest son of William Bentinck, 2nd Duke of Portland and "the richest woman in great Britain", Lady Margaret Cavendish-Harley, and inherited many lands from his mother and his maternal grandmother, who was the daughter of John Holles, 1st Duke of Newcastle. He was educated at Westminster School and Christ Church, Oxford, where he graduated MA in 1757.

In December 1757, the nineteen-year-old Lord Titchfield was sent to study under Lord Stormont for a year in Warsaw, accompanied by Stormont's secretary, Benjamin Langlois. Stormont was to superintend all expenditures on his equipage, while Langlois was to hire local masters and direct the studies of the teenaged Titchfield. The books he directed him to read were ancient history, modern history and general law.

In 1759, Titchfield travelled with Langlois through Germany to Italy, spent a year in Turin, and then went on to Florence. When Stormont was appointed ambassador to Vienna in 1763, Langlois went with him as Secretary of the embassy.

== Marriage and children ==
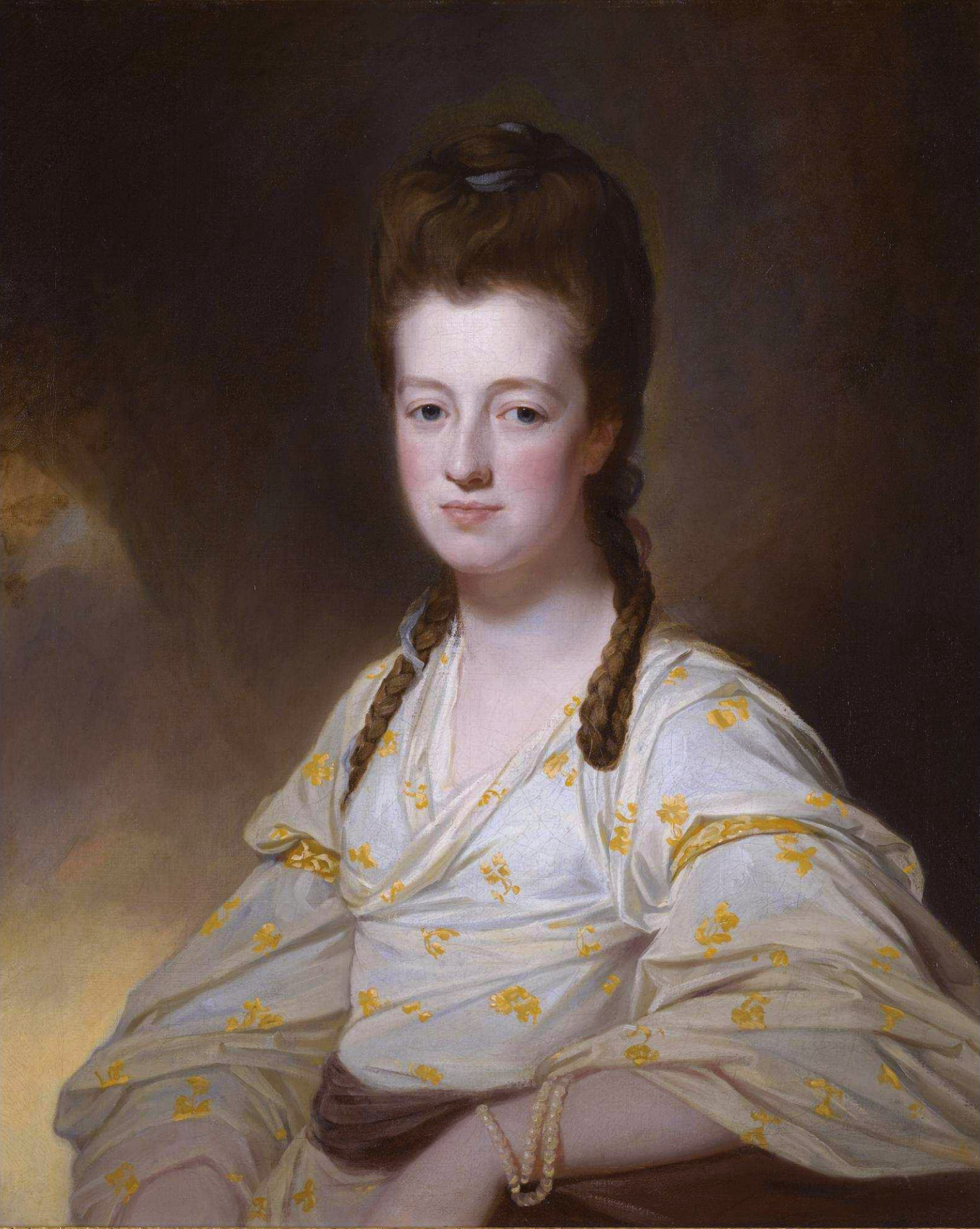
Lady Dorothy Cavendish, by George Romney, c. 1772

On 8 November 1766, Portland married Lady Dorothy Cavendish, only daughter of William Cavendish, 4th Duke of Devonshire and Lady Charlotte Boyle. They were parents of nine children, six of whom survived to adulthood:

- William Henry Cavendish-Scott-Bentinck, 4th Duke of Portland (24 June 1768 – 27 March 1854)
- Lt Gen Lord William Henry Cavendish-Bentinck (14 September 1774 – 17 June 1839)
- Lady Charlotte Cavendish-Bentinck (2 October 1775 – 28 July 1862), who married Charles Greville.
- Lady Mary Cavendish-Bentinck (13 March 1779 – 6 November 1843)
- Lord William Charles Augustus Cavendish-Bentinck (20 May 1780 – 28 April 1826), an ancestor of the 6th Duke of Portland and Queen Elizabeth the Queen Mother.
- Lord Frederick Cavendish-Bentinck (2 November 1781 – 11 February 1828), an ancestor of the 8th and 9th Duke of Portland.

== Political career ==
Portland was elected to sit in the Parliament of Great Britain for Weobley in 1761 before he entered the House of Lords after he succeeded his father as Duke of Portland the next year. He was associated with the aristocratic Whig Party of Lord Rockingham and served as Lord Chamberlain of the Household in Rockingham's first government (1765–1766).

=== Lord Lieutenant of Ireland ===
Portland served as Lord Lieutenant of Ireland in Rockingham's second ministry (April–August 1782). He faced strong demands for conciliatory measures following years of coercion and taxation brought about by the British government's engagement in the American Revolutionary War. Portland resolved to make concessions and, overcoming the resistance of Lord Shelburne, the Home Secretary to whom he reported, convinced Parliament to repeal the Declaratory Act and to modify Poynings' Law. Following Rockingham's death, Portland resigned from Lord Shelburne's ministry along with other supporters of Charles James Fox.

=== Prime Minister: 1783 ===
In April 1783, Portland was selected as the titular head of a coalition government as Prime Minister, whose real leaders were Charles James Fox and Lord North. He served as First Lord of the Treasury in the ministry until its fall in December that same year. During his tenure, the Treaty of Paris was signed, which formally ended the American Revolutionary War. The government was brought down after it had lost a vote in the House of Lords on its proposed reform of the East India Company after George III had let it be known that any peer voting for the measure would be considered his personal enemy.

In 1789, Portland became one of several vice presidents of London's Foundling Hospital. The charity had become one of the most fashionable of the time, with several notables serving on its board. At its creation, 50 years earlier, Portland's father, William Bentinck, 2nd Duke of Portland, had been one of the founding governors, as listed on the charity's royal charter granted by George II. The hospital had a mission to care for the abandoned children in London, and it achieved rapid fame through its poignant mission, its art collection donated from supporting artists and the popular benefit concerts by George Frideric Handel. In 1793, Portland took over the presidency of the charity from Lord North.

=== Home Secretary ===
Along with many other conservative Whigs such as Edmund Burke, Portland was deeply uncomfortable with the French Revolution; he broke with Fox over that issue and joined Pitt's government as Secretary of State for the Home Department in 1794. When the British fleets at Spithead and the Nore mutinied between April and June 1797, Portland sent magistrates to investigate and report on any connections to seditious societies, though none were found. As Home Secretary, Portland oversaw the administration of patronage and financial inducements, which were often secret, to secure the passage of the Act of Union 1800. He continued to serve in the cabinet until Pitt's death in 1806, from 1801 to 1805 as Lord President of the Council and then as a Minister without Portfolio.

=== Prime Minister: 1807–1809 ===
In March 1807, after the collapse of the Ministry of all the Talents, Pitt's former supporters returned to power, and Portland was once again an acceptable figurehead for a fractious group of ministers that included George Canning, Lord Castlereagh, Lord Hawkesbury and Spencer Perceval.

Portland's second government saw the United Kingdom's complete isolation on the continent but also the beginning of its recovery with the start of the Peninsular War. In late 1809, with Portland's health poor and the ministry rocked by the scandalous duel between Canning and Castlereagh, Portland resigned and died shortly thereafter.

He was Recorder of Nottingham until his death.

== Death and burial ==
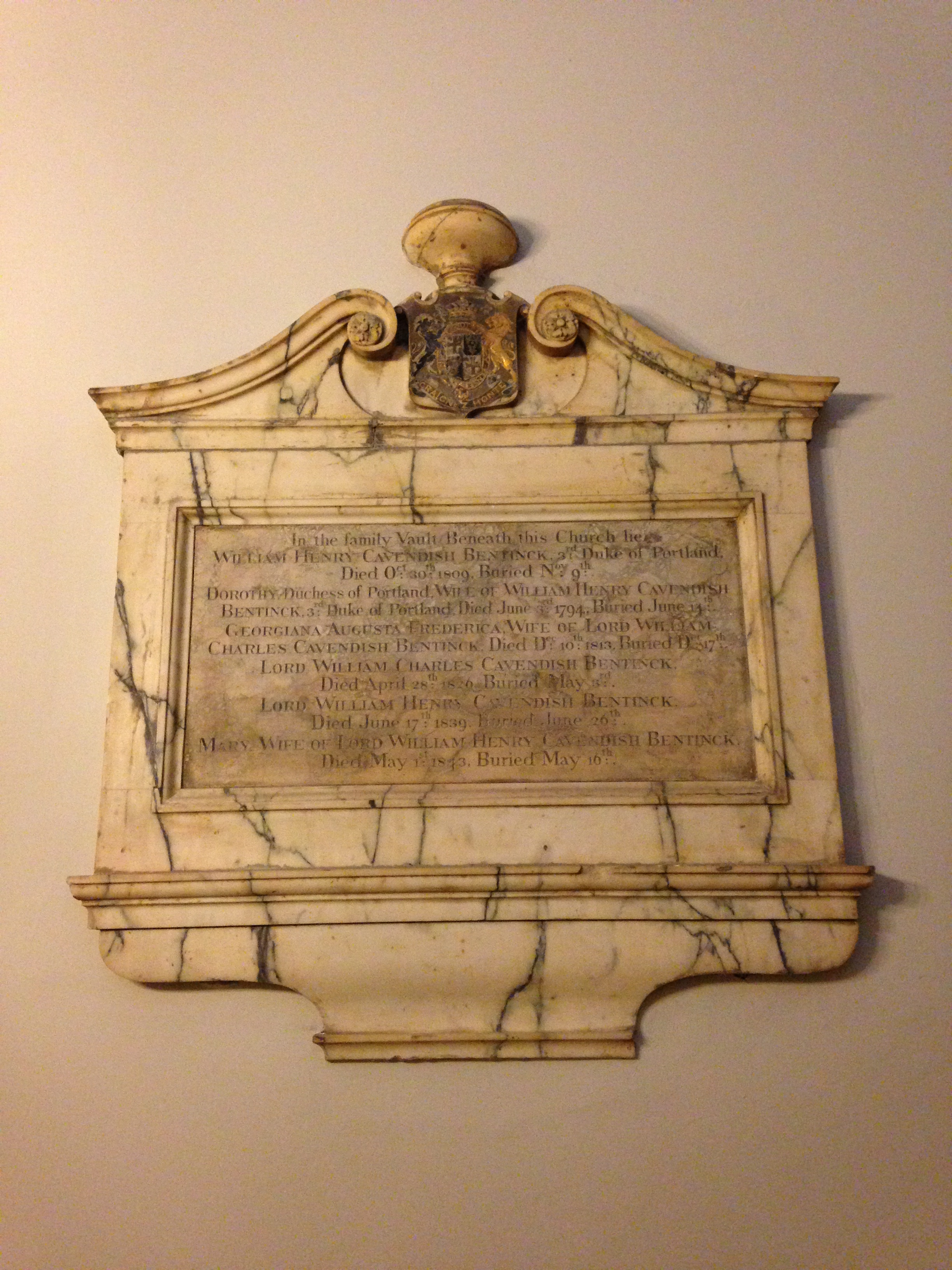
Memorial to the 3rd Duke of Portland at the family vault in St Marylebone Parish Church

He died on 30 October 1809 at Burlington House, Piccadilly, after an operation for a kidney stone, and was buried at St Marylebone Parish Church, London.

He had lived expensively: with an income of £17,000 a year (worth £791,000 in 2017), he had debts at his death computed at £52,000 (£2.42 million in 2017), which were paid off by his succeeding son by selling off some property, including Bulstrode Park.

Along with Sir Robert Peel, Lord Aberdeen, Benjamin Disraeli, Marquess of Salisbury, Sir Henry Campbell-Bannerman, Bonar Law and Neville Chamberlain, he was the first of eight British prime ministers to die while his direct successor was in office.

== Legacy ==
The Portland Vase of Roman glass was given its name because it was owned by Portland at his family residence at Bulstrode Park.

Portland Parish, in Jamaica, was named after him. Titchfield High School, founded in 1786, is in the parish and is also named in his honour. The school's crest is derived from his personal crest.

Great Portland Street in Marylebone is named after him. It was built on land that the family once owned. Great Portland Street tube station, opened in 1863, takes its name from the latter.

North Bentinck Arm and South Bentinck Arm were named for the Bentinck family by George Vancouver in 1793, along with other names on the British Columbia Coast, such as the Portland Canal.

Portland Bay in Victoria, Australia was named in 1800 by the British navigator James Grant. The city of Portland is located on the bay.

The department of Manuscripts and Special Collections, The University of Nottingham holds a number of papers relating to him. His personal and political papers (Pw F) are part of the Portland (Welbeck) Collection, and the Portland (London) Collection (Pl) contains his correspondence and official papers, especially in series Pl C.

The Portland Estate Papers held at Nottinghamshire Archives also contain items relating to the 3rd Duke's properties.

The Portland Collection, of fine and decorative art includes pieces owned and commissioned by him, including paintings by George Stubbs.

== Arms ==
Coat of arms of William Cavendish-Bentinck, 3rd Duke of Portland
Notes The title Duke of Portland was created by George I in 1716. Coronet A Coronet of a Duke Crest Out of a ducal coronet proper two arms counter-embowed vested Gules, on the hands gloves Or, each holding an ostrich feather Argent (Bentinck); A snake nowed proper (Cavendish) Escutcheon Quarterly: 1st and 4th, Azure a cross moline Argent (Bentinck); 2nd and 3rd, Sable three stags' heads cabossed Argent attired Or, a crescent for difference (Cavendish) Supporters Two lions double queued, the dexter Or and the sinister sable Motto Craignez Honte (Fear Dishonour)

== Cabinets as Prime Minister ==
=== First Ministry, April – December 1783 ===
- The Duke of Portland—First Lord of the Treasury
- Lord Stormont—Lord President of the Council
- Lord Carlisle—Lord Privy Seal
- Lord North—Secretary of State for the Home Department
- Charles James Fox—Secretary of State for Foreign Affairs
- The Viscount Keppel—First Lord of the Admiralty
- Lord John Cavendish—Chancellor of the Exchequer
- The Viscount Townshend—Master-General of the Ordnance
- Lord Northington—Lord-Lieutenant of Ireland
- The Great Seal is in Commission

=== Second Ministry, March 1807 – October 1809 ===
- The Duke of Portland—First Lord of the Treasury
- Lord Eldon—Lord Chancellor
- Lord Camden—Lord President of the Council
- Lord Westmorland—Lord Privy Seal
- Lord Hawkesbury, after 1808, Lord Liverpool – Secretary of State for the Home Department
- George Canning—Secretary of State for Foreign Affairs
- Lord Castlereagh—Secretary of State for War and the Colonies
- Lord Mulgrave—First Lord of the Admiralty
- Spencer Perceval—Chancellor of the Exchequer and of the Duchy of Lancaster
- Lord Chatham—Master-General of the Ordnance
- Lord Bathurst—President of the Board of Trade

Changes

- July 1809—Lord Harrowby, the President of the Board of Control, and Lord Granville Leveson-Gower, the Secretary at War, enter the Cabinet

== Ancestry ==
Ancestors of William Cavendish-Bentinck, 3rd Duke of Portland

8. William Bentinck, 1st Earl of Portland
4. Henry Bentinck, 1st Duke of Portland
9. Anne Villiers
2. William Bentinck, 2nd Duke of Portland
10. Wriothesley Noel, 2nd Earl of Gainsborough
5. Lady Elizabeth Noel
11. The Hon. Catherine Greville
1. William Cavendish-Bentinck, 3rd Duke of Portland
12. Robert Harley, 1st Earl of Oxford and Earl Mortimer
6. Edward Harley, 2nd Earl of Oxford and Earl Mortimer
13. Elizabeth Foley
3. Lady Margaret Cavendish Harley
14. John Holles, 1st Duke of Newcastle
7. Lady Henrietta Cavendish Holles
15. Lady Margaret Cavendish

Parliament of Great Britain
Preceded by John Craster; George Venables-Vernon	Member of Parliament for Weobley; 1761–1762; With: Hon. Henry Thynne	Succeeded by William Lynch; Hon. Henry Thynne
Political offices
Preceded by The Earl Gower	Lord Chamberlain; 1765–1766	Succeeded by The Earl of Hertford
Preceded by The Earl of Carlisle	Lord Lieutenant of Ireland; 1782	Succeeded by The Earl Temple
Preceded by The Earl of Shelburne	Prime Minister of Great Britain; 2 April 1783 – 18 December 1783	Succeeded by William Pitt the Younger
Preceded by The Earl of Shelburne	Leader of the House of Lords; 1783	Succeeded by The Earl Temple
Preceded by Henry Dundas	Home Secretary; 1794–1801	Succeeded by Lord Pelham
Preceded by The Earl of Chatham	Lord President of the Council; 1801–1805	Succeeded by The Viscount Sidmouth
New office	Minister without Portfolio; 1805–1806	Succeeded by The Earl FitzWilliam
Preceded by The Lord Grenville	Prime Minister of the United Kingdom; 31 March 1807 – 4 October 1809	Succeeded by Spencer Perceval
Academic offices
Preceded by The Earl of Guilford	Chancellor of the University of Oxford; 1792–1809	Succeeded by The Lord Grenville
Honorary titles
Preceded by Lord North	President of the Foundling Hospital; 1793–1809	Succeeded by The Prince of Wales later became King George IV
Preceded by The 3rd Duke of Newcastle-under-Lyne	Lord Lieutenant of Nottinghamshire; 1795–1809	Succeeded by The 4th Duke of Newcastle-under-Lyne
Peerage of Great Britain
Preceded by William Bentinck	Duke of Portland; 1762–1809	Succeeded by William Cavendish-Scott-Bentinck
