= Old Cavendish Street =

Street in Marylebone, London

Coordinates: 51°30′55.09″N 0°8′45.38″W

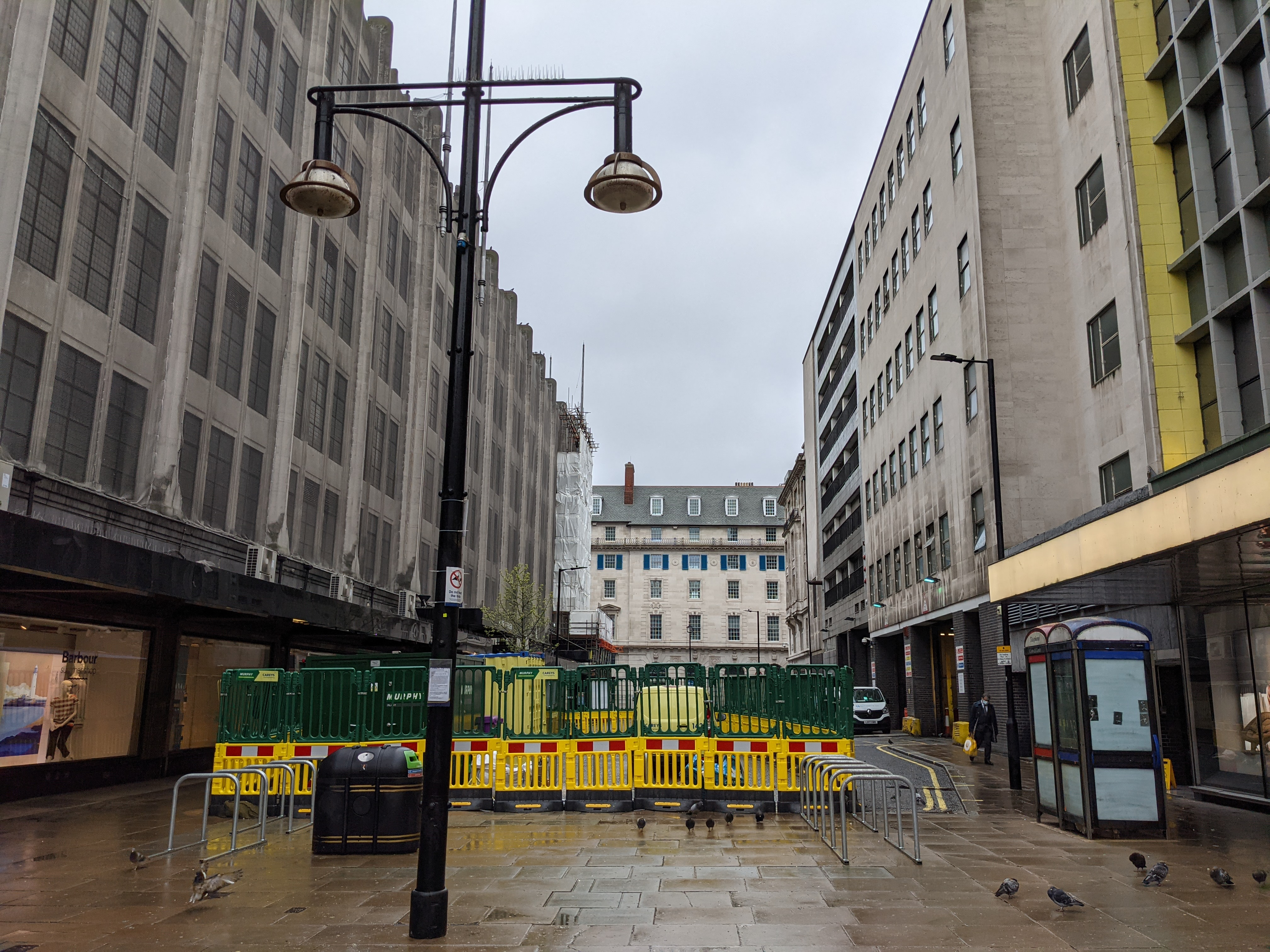

Old Cavendish Street, originally Cavendish Street, is a street in Marylebone in the City of Westminster in central London that runs from Henrietta Place in the north to Oxford Street in the south.

== History and buildings ==
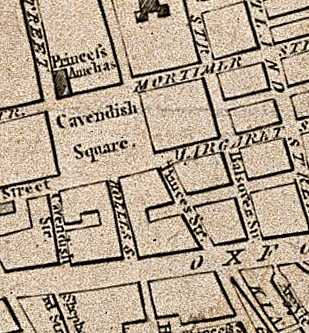
Cavendish Square and Cavendish Street on a 1764 map.

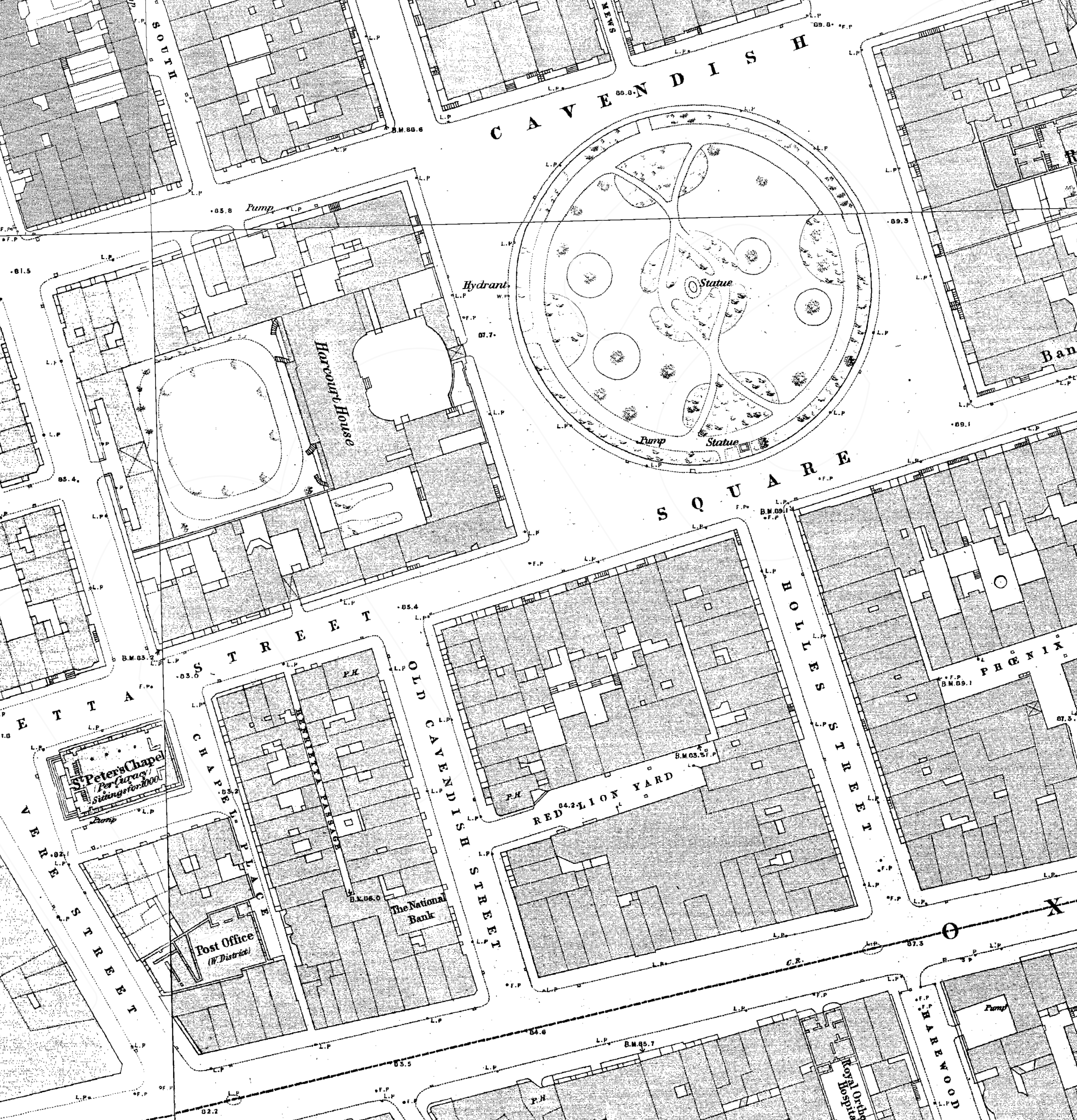
Cavendish Square and Old Cavendish Street (bottom centre) on an 1870s Ordnance Survey map.

The street was one of those laid out in the early 1700s when the area north of Oxford Street was urbanised on a grid pattern. It was named after Lady Henrietta Cavendish, the heiress to the Manor of Marylebone lands and the wife of Edward Harley after whom Harley Street was named.

It was renamed Old Cavendish Street to distinguish it from the much longer New Cavendish Street to the north.

In the 1870s it included two public houses, the Red Lion at No. 5 (rebuilt 1879), on the east side, and the Crown at No. 12A (rebuilt 1885–6) and was a throughway to Oxford Street but it has since been pedestrianised at the southern end. The cul-de-sac Red Lion Yard, later known as Cavendish Buildings, ran from the eastern side before the construction of the House of Fraser (previously D.H. Evans) store in Oxford Street. Today, the street is entirely taken up by the House of Fraser department store on its western side and the John Lewis store on the east, both of which front Oxford Street.
