= Holles Street =

Street in Marylebone, London

Coordinates: 51°30′57.1″N 0°8′40.89″W

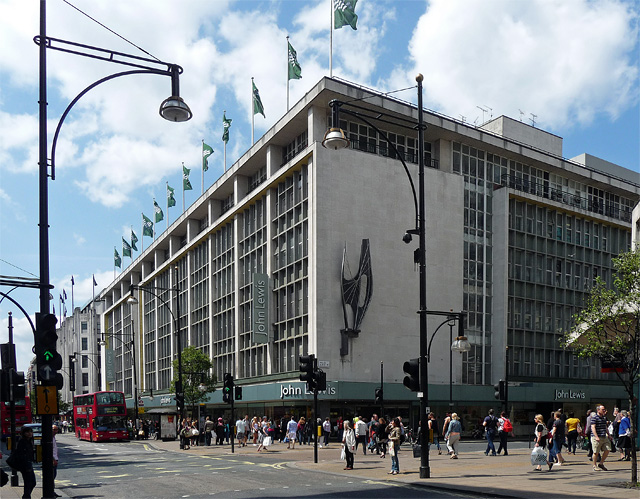
Oxford Street (left) and Holles Street (right)

Holles Street is a street in Marylebone in the City of Westminster in central London that runs from the south side of Cavendish Square to Oxford Street.

== History ==
The street was one of those laid out around 1729 when the area north of Oxford Street was urbanised on a grid pattern. It was named after John Holles, 1st Duke of Newcastle, who in 1710 purchased the Manor of Marylebone. His daughter was Henrietta Harley, Countess of Oxford and Countess Mortimer who married Edward Harley after whom Harley Street was named and who built Holles Street.

Lord Byron was born on the street on 22 January 1788 – his birthplace is now supposedly occupied by a branch of the department store John Lewis.

== Today ==
Once the location of small shops and houses, the street is now almost entirely taken up the John Lewis department store on the western side and the former British Home Stores department store (1962–63) and other commercial units on the east, both of which have their main entrances on Oxford Street. The John Lewis store was started in 1936 but damaged by bombing during the Second World War and rebuilt in 1958–60.

Barbara Hepworth's sculpture Winged Figure (1963) is on the Holles Street side of the John Lewis department store.

== Gallery ==
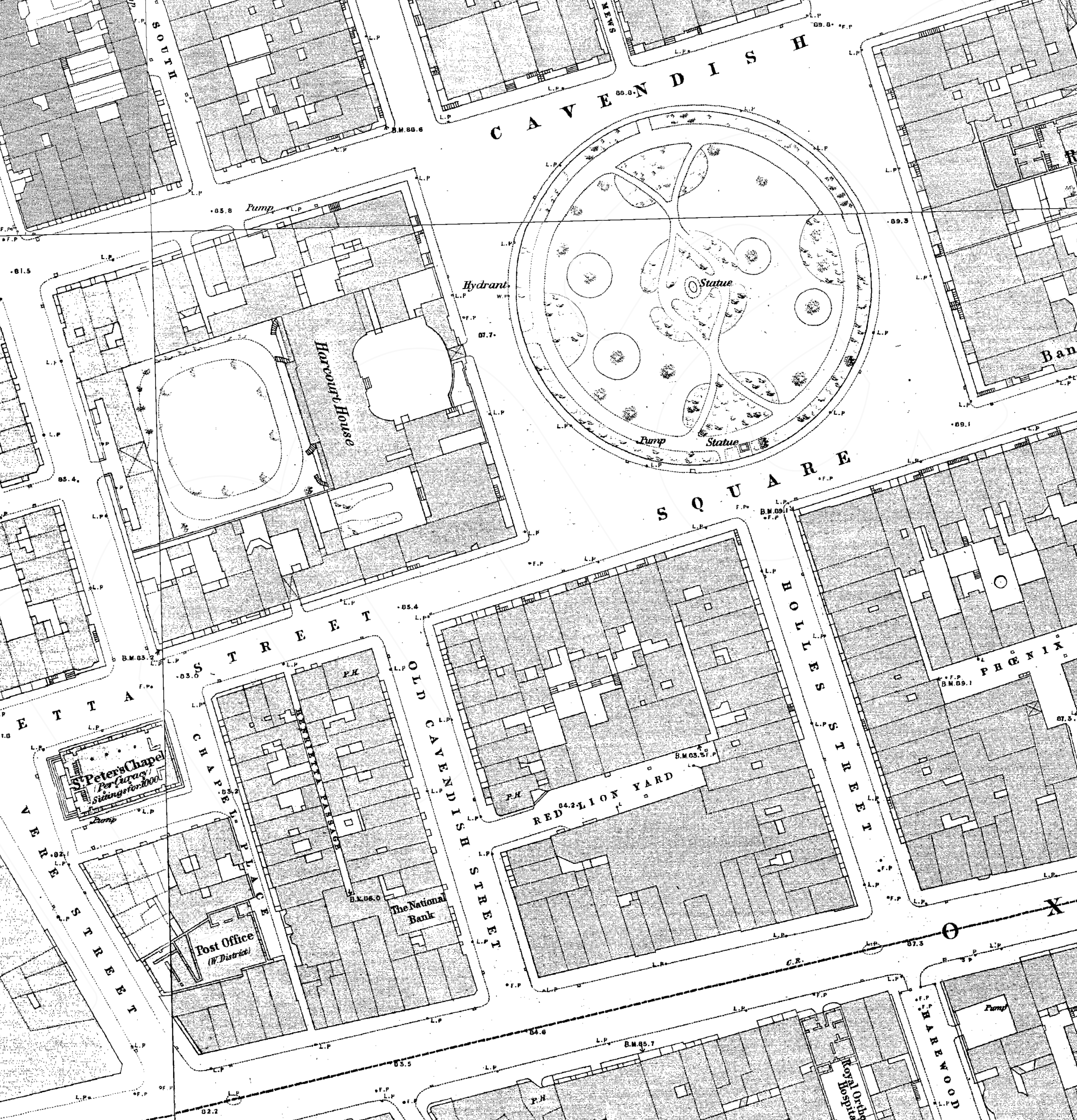
Holles Street (centre right) on an 1870s Ordnance Survey map.

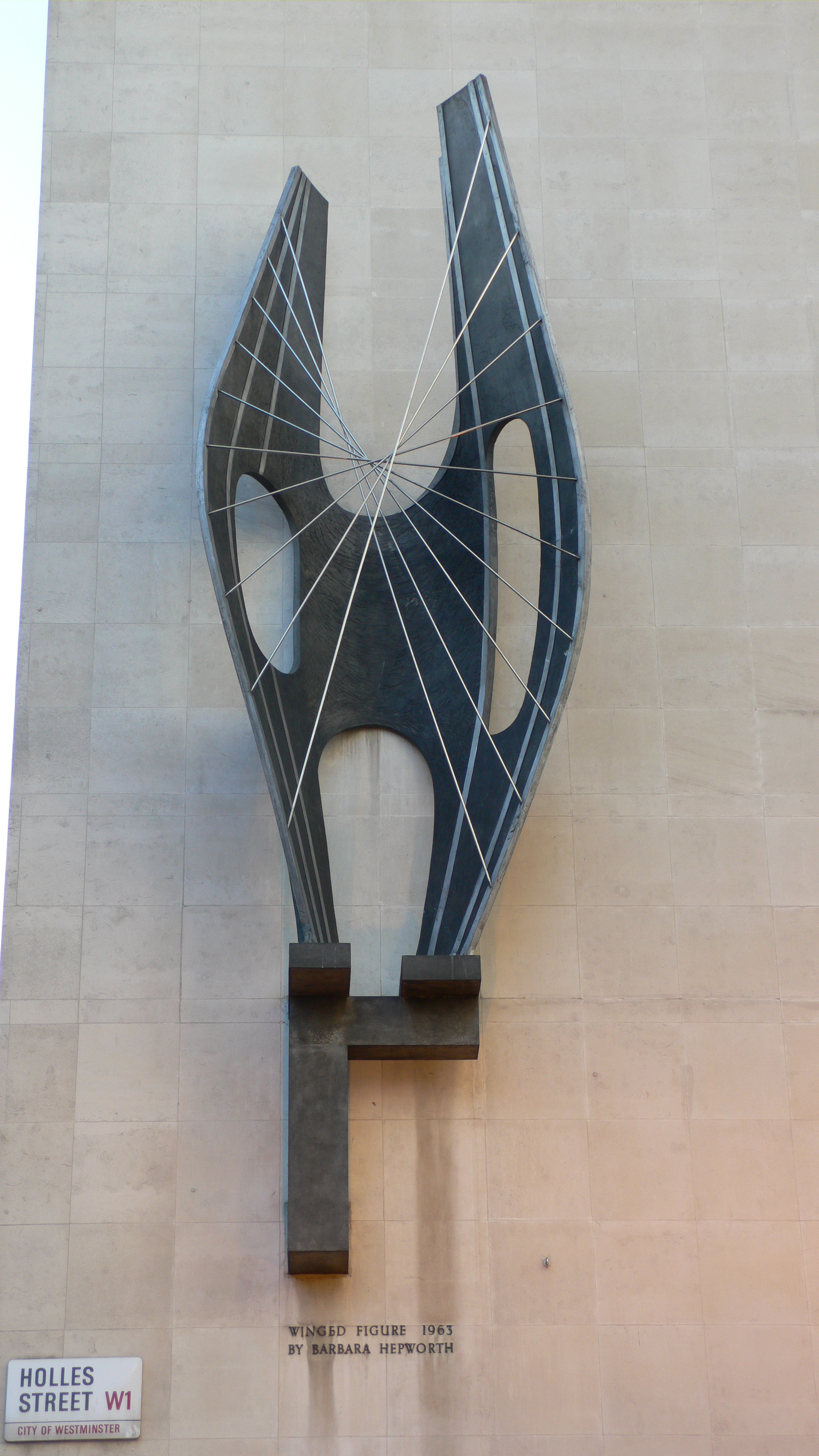
Barbara Hepworth's Winged Figure, 1963, on the side of the John Lewis department store in Holles Street and Oxford Street.
