= Henrietta Place =

Street in Marylebone, London

Coordinates: 51.51587°N 0.14581°W

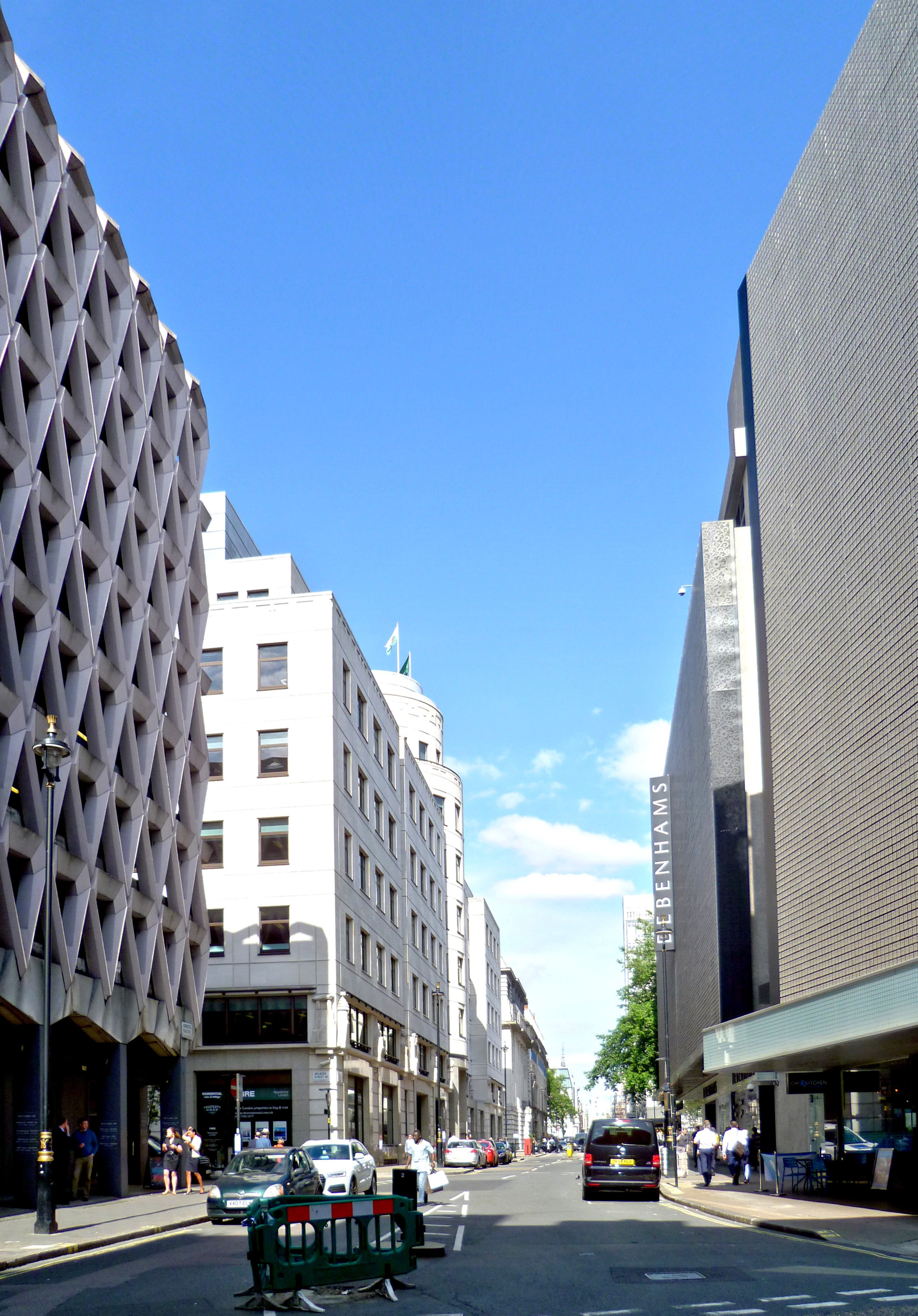
- Henrietta Place from Marylebone Lane
- Interactive map of Henrietta Place
- Former name: Henrietta Street
- Location: City of Westminster, Greater London, United Kingdom
- Postal code: W1
- Nearest tube station: Bond Street
- West end: Marylebone Lane
- East end: Cavendish Square

Other
- Known for: Debenhams; House of Fraser; St Peter, Vere Street

Henrietta Place, originally known as Henrietta Street, is a street in Marylebone in the City of Westminster in central London that runs from Marylebone Lane in the east to Cavendish Square in the west. It is joined on the north side by Welbeck Street and Wimpole Street, and on the south side by Vere Street, Chapel Place, and Old Cavendish Street.

== History ==
Henrietta Street, now Place, was named after Lady Henrietta Cavendish, the 18th century heiress to the Manor of Marylebone lands and the wife of Edward Harley after whom Harley Street was named. The street was laid out around 1729 when the area, which was previously rural, was urbanised using a grid plan.

During the nineteenth century the street fell out of favour and in the twentieth century parts of the western end were redeveloped when the Marshall & Snelgrove department store on the south side was redeveloped as Debenhams and the Welbeck Street car park built for the store on the north side.

== Buildings ==
On the north side of the street used to be the Welbeck Street car park (since demolished) and The Royal Society of Medicine which has its entrance in Wimpole Street. Between them is Henrietta House which is owned by Lazari Investments and occupied by property firm CBRE Group since 2011 after Diageo moved out. It was designed by Christopher Haddon of the Building Design Partnership and incorporates at first floor level on the exterior a series of fifteen Portland stone sculptures by Keir Smith commissioned by the Public Art Development Trust to show the architectural history of Britain. The project was the winner of the Royal Society of Arts Art for Architecture award in 1990. At the Cavendish Square end on the north side is the Royal College of Nursing.

The south side of the street is dominated by the back of retail premises on Oxford Street such as the Debenhams - now replaced by the M Building - and House of Fraser (previously D.H. Evans) department stores. The Debenhams store was built in the late 1960s or early 1970s to replace a Marshall & Snelgrove store on the same site. Between them is the church of St Peter, Vere Street, a grade I listed building also known as the Oxford Chapel or the Marylebone Chapel, the architect of which was James Gibbs who also lived in the street. Henrietta Passage once ran south into the centre of the buildings that were on the site now occupied by House of Fraser.

Between 1724 and 1732, Gibbs designed and built four houses in the street, living in number 5 from 1731 until his death in 1754 and letting numbers 9, 10, and 11. Number 11 was demolished in 1956 when the site was acquired by Debenhams. The parlour from the house was donated to the Victoria & Albert Museum where it is now on display.

== Notable inhabitants ==
- James Gibbs, architect
- Countess of Mornington, mother of the Duke of Wellington
- William Theed, sculptor, creator of the group "Asia" on the Albert Memorial.
- Honorable Lady Grace Cosby (née Montagu) (1687- 23 Dec 1767), Daughter of British Royal Descent to Lady Elizabeth Pelham and Hon. Edward Montagu, MP. And widowed wife of Brig-Gen. Sir William Cosby, 24th Governor of New York Province, New Jersey & Territories, Colonial America.

== Gallery ==
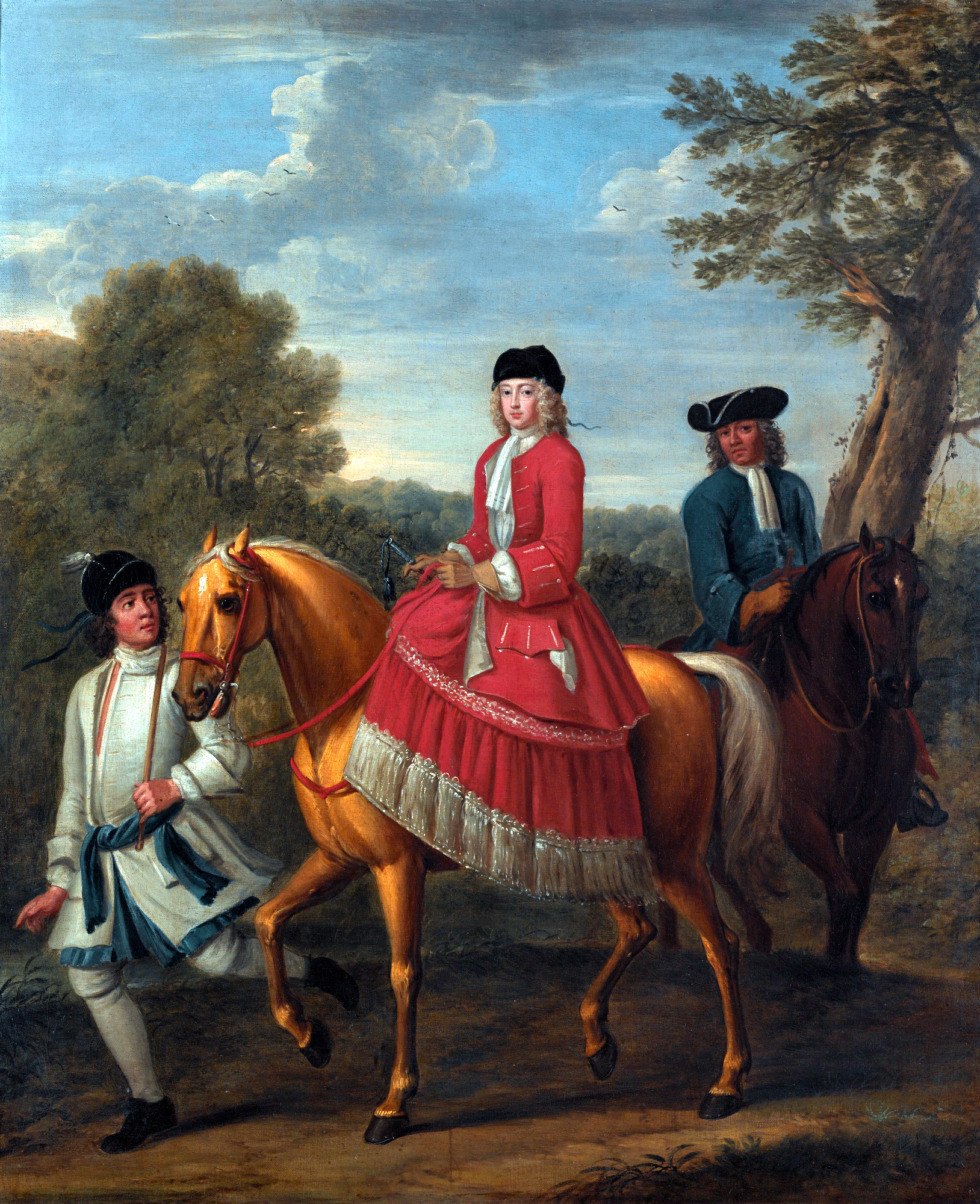
Portrait of Henrietta Harley, after whom the street is named, by John Wootton.

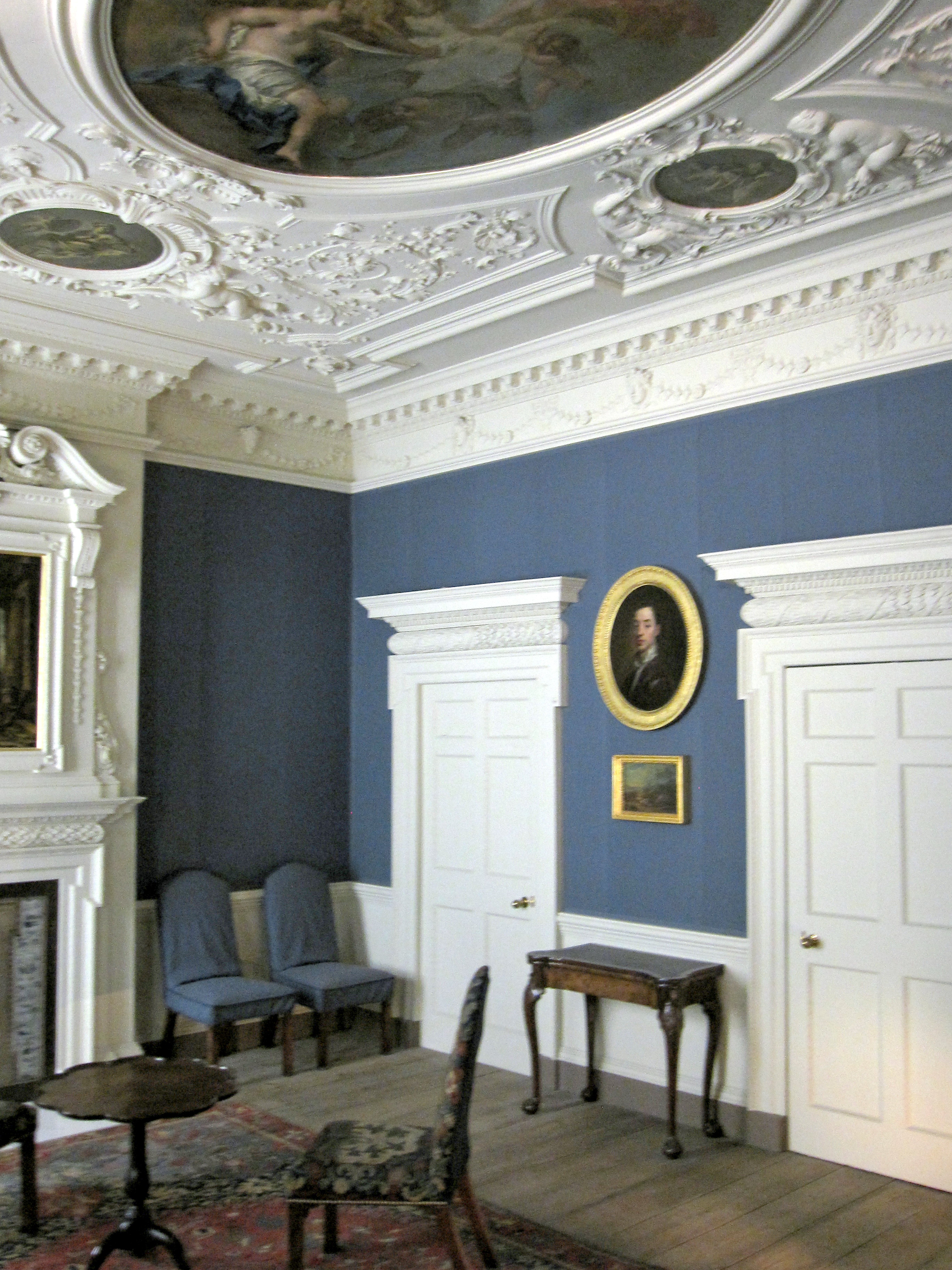
Parlour from 11 Henrietta Street

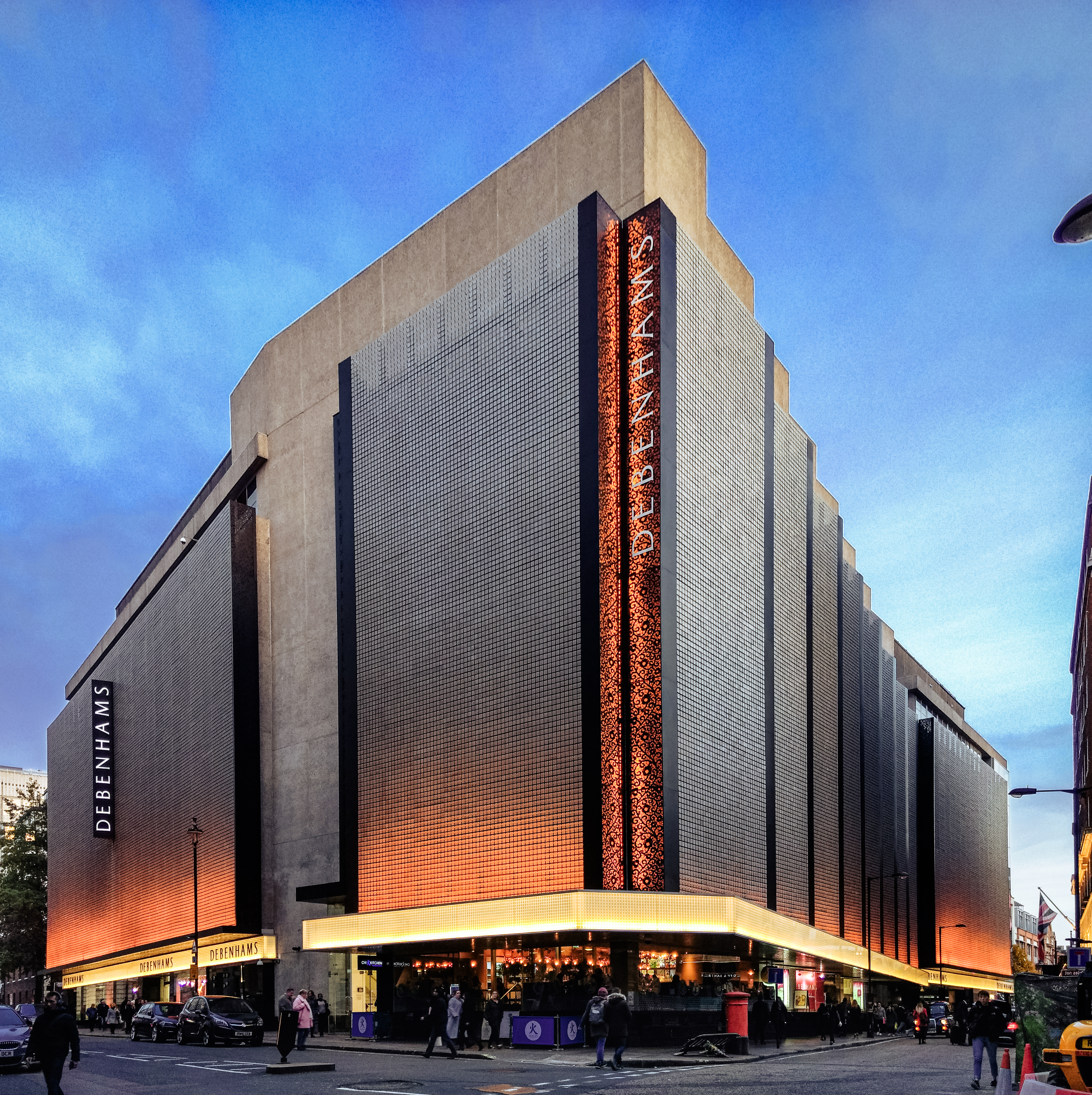
Debenhams on the corner with Marylebone Lane

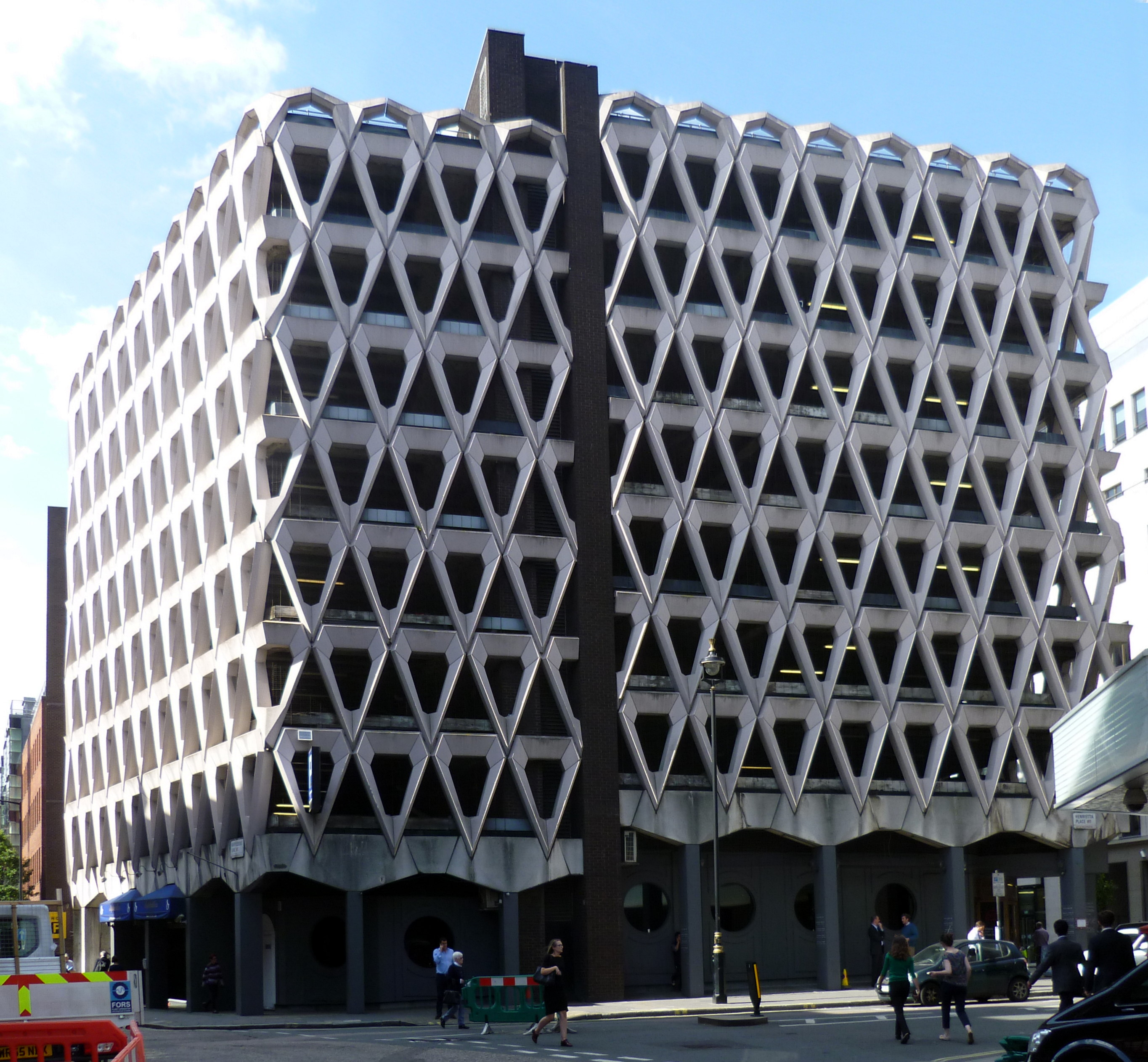
Welbeck Street car park

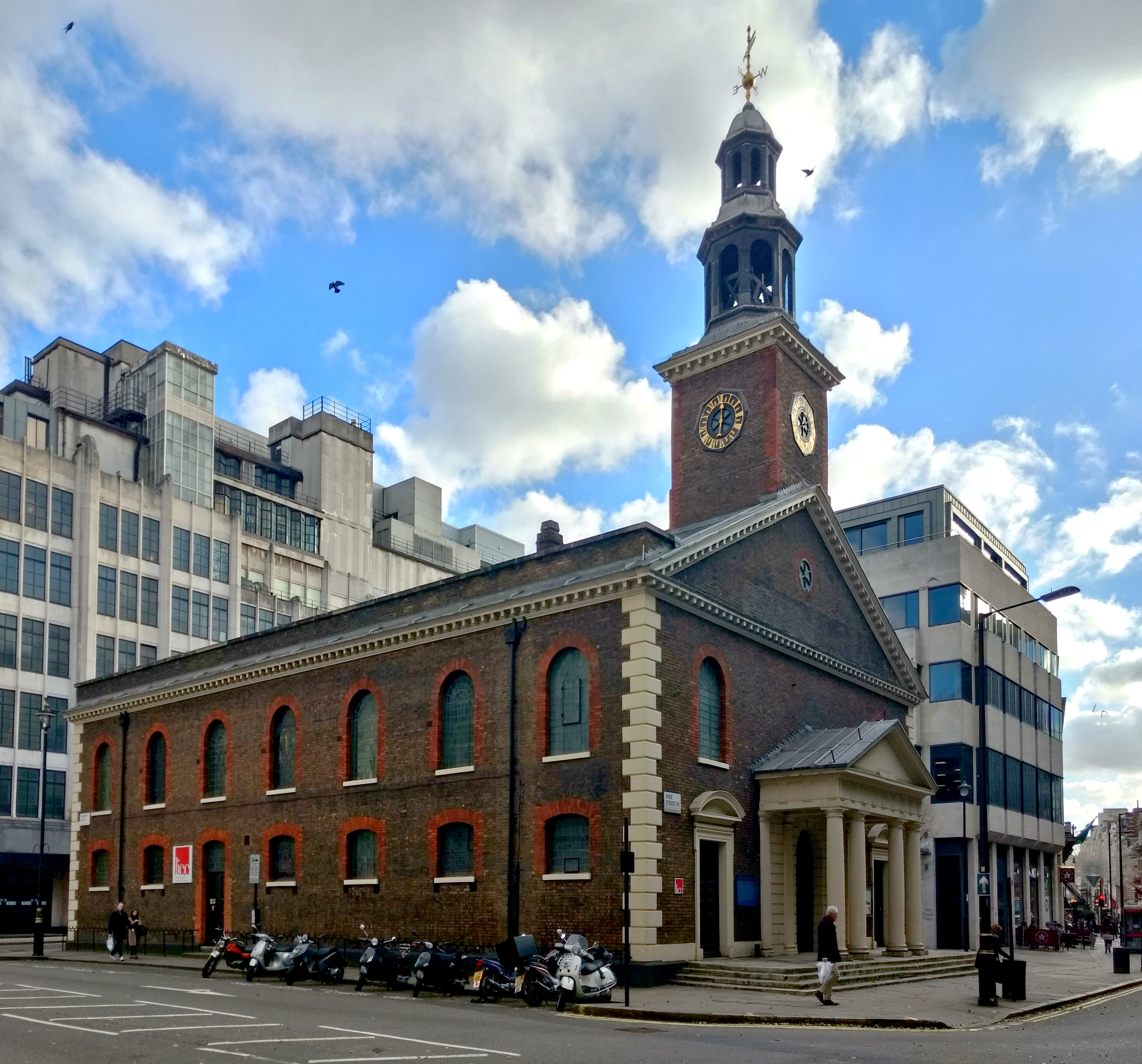
St Peter, Vere Street

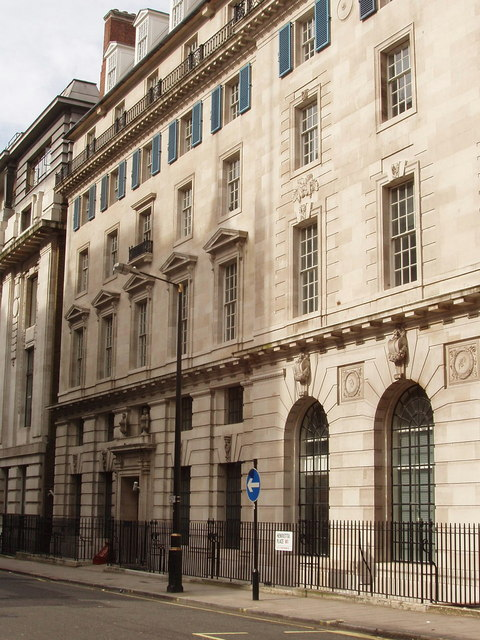
Royal College of Nursing

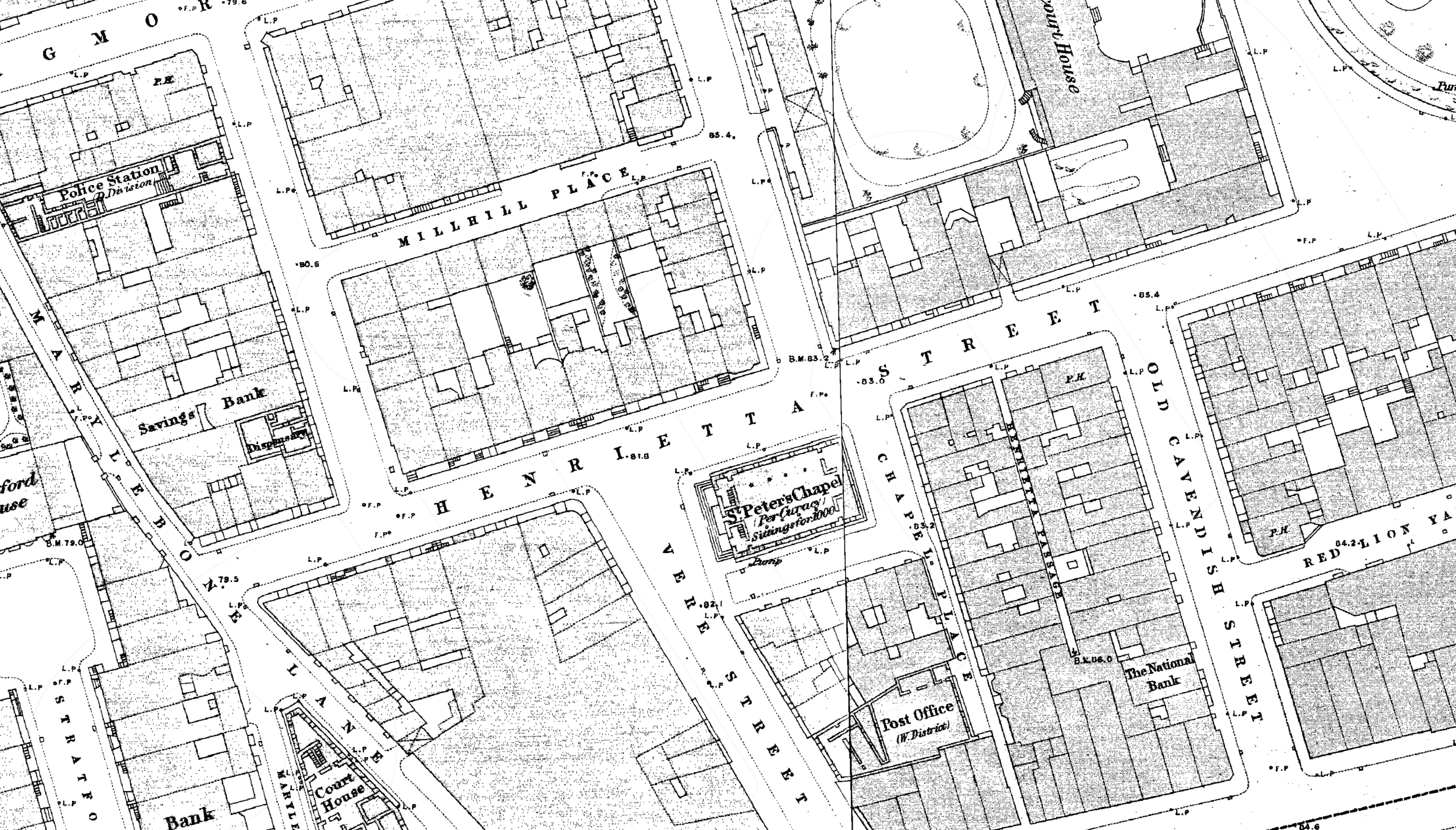
Henrietta Place marked as Henrietta Street on an 1870s Ordnance Survey map
