= 1st Duke of Newcastle =

The Duke of Newcastle is a title that has been created thrice in British history. The first Duke may refer to:

- William Cavendish, 1st Duke of Newcastle (1592–1676), English polymath and aristocrat
- John Holles, 1st Duke of Newcastle (1662–1711), English peer
- Thomas Pelham-Holles, 1st Duke of Newcastle (1693–1768), British Whig statesman
