= Shiva Hotels =

Shiva Hotels is a privately owned United Kingdom based hotel group founded in 2003 by former Lehman Brothers derivatives trader Rishi Sachdev.

== History ==
In 2013, the company purchased the Millennium Bridge House hotel from American private equity firm The Carlyle Group, for £87.6m.

In 2014, the company purchased the Kingsway Hall Hotel for £96m.

In February 2015, it was reported that the group had placed two Ramada hotels it owned up for sale for £22m free of any brand tie.

In October 2015, it was reported that the group was developing four unbranded luxury hotels in central London.

In 2016, it acquired the site of the Welbeck Street Car Park for redevelopment as a hotel after Historic England decided not to register the structure as a listed building.
