= William Bentinck, 2nd Duke of Portland =

British nobleman

His Grace The Duke of Portland KG
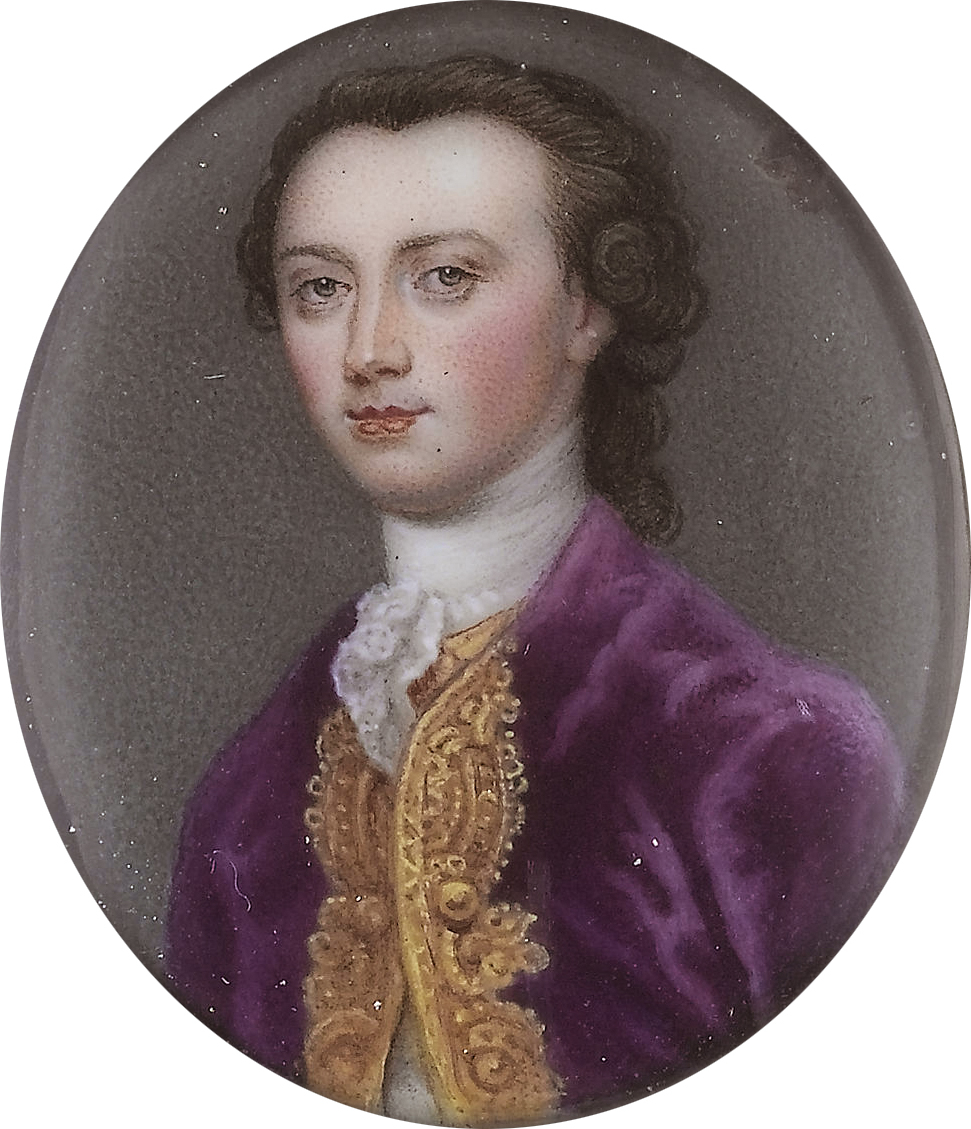
- William Bentinck, 2nd Duke of Portland (Christian Friedrich Zincke)

Personal details
- Born: 1 March 1709
- Died: 1 May 1762 (aged 53)
- Resting place: Westminster Abbey
- Spouse: Lady Margaret Harley
- Children: Elizabeth Thynne, Marchioness of Bath; Henrietta Grey, Countess of Stamford; William Cavendish-Bentinck, 3rd Duke of Portland; Lady Margaret Bentinck; Lady Frances Bentinck; Lord Edward Bentinck
- Parent(s): Henry Bentinck, 1st Duke of Portland; Elizabeth Noel

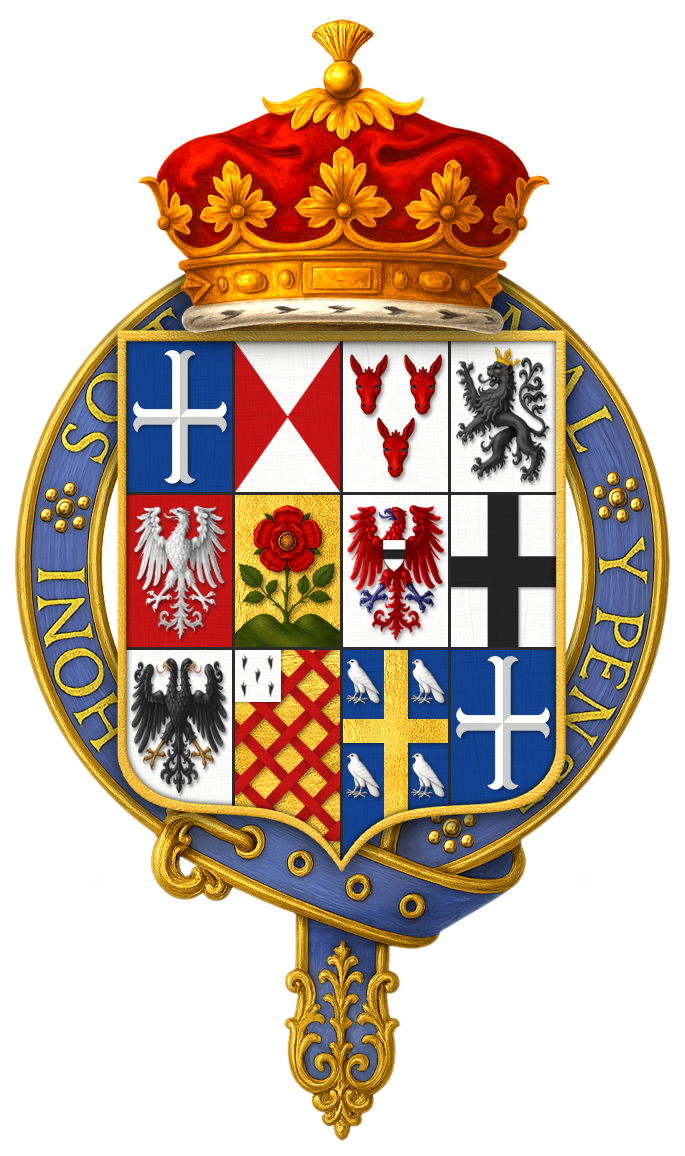
Quartered arms of William Bentinck, 2nd Duke of Portland, KG

William Bentinck, 2nd Duke of Portland KG (1 March 1709 – 1 May 1762), styled Viscount Woodstock from 1709 to 1716 and Marquess of Titchfield from 1716 to 1726, was a British peer and politician.

== Early life ==
Portland was the son of Henry Bentinck, 1st Duke of Portland and his wife Elizabeth Noel, daughter of Wriothesley Baptist Noel, 2nd Earl of Gainsborough. He succeeded his father in the dukedom as a teen in 1726.

== Career ==
He was an original governor of the Foundling Hospital in London, founded in 1739, and was made a Knight of the Garter in 1741.

The Duke did not seek any public office, but focused on his family life at the family seat, Bulstrode Park.

Portland is identified in The Handy-Book of Literary Curiosities (1909) as one of the perpetrators of The Great Bottle Hoax of 1749, in which a large crowd was lured to a London theatre with the expectation of seeing a man jump into a "quart bottle".

== Personal life ==
On 11 June 1734, he married Lady Margaret Harley, daughter of Edward Harley, 2nd Earl of Oxford and Earl Mortimer. They had six children:

- Lady Elizabeth Bentinck (Welbeck Abbey, 27 June 1735 – 25 December 1825, London), who married Thomas Thynne, 1st Marquess of Bath (1734–1796)
- Lady Henrietta Bentinck (8 February 1737 – 4 June 1827), who married George Grey, 5th Earl of Stamford (1737–1819)
- William Henry Cavendish-Bentinck, 3rd Duke of Portland (b. 14 April 1738 – d. 30 October 1809), who married Lady Dorothy Cavendish (1750–1794) daughter of William Cavendish, 4th Duke of Devonshire
- Lady Margaret Bentinck (26 July 1739 – 28 April 1756)
- Lady Frances Bentinck (9 April 1741 – March 1743)
- Lord Edward Charles Cavendish-Bentinck (3 March 1744 – 8 October 1819), married Elizabeth Cumberland (d. 1837)

Portland died in May 1762, aged 53, was buried at Westminster Abbey. He was succeeded in the dukedom by his eldest son William, who became Prime Minister of Great Britain. The Duchess of Portland died in 1785.

Peerage of England
Preceded by Henry Bentinck	Duke of Portland; 1726–1762	Succeeded by William Cavendish-Bentinck
