= Welbeck Street car park =

Car park in Marylebone, London, England

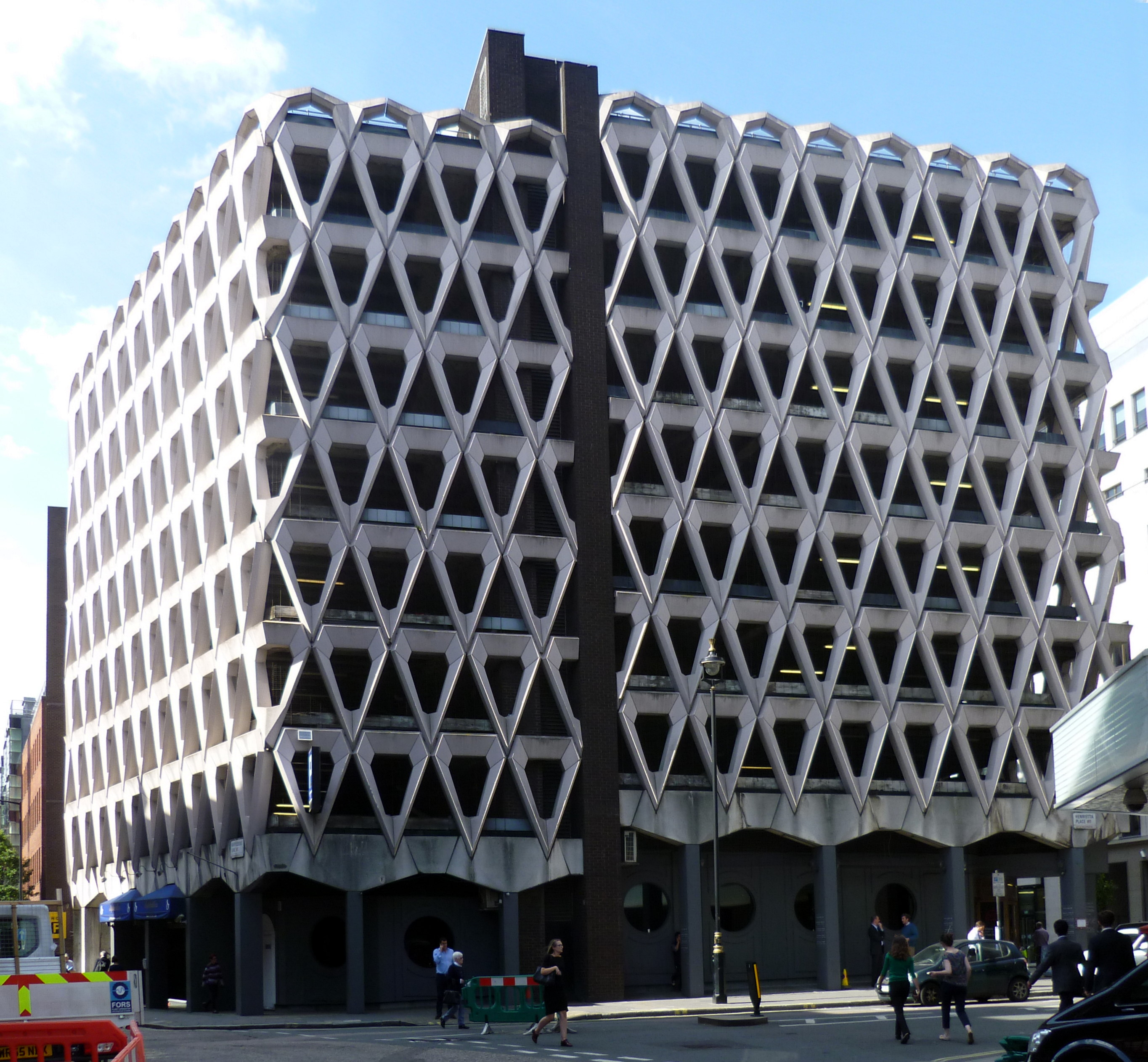
- Welbeck Street car park photographed in 2016
- Interactive map of the Welbeck Street car park area

General information
- Type: Car park
- Architectural style: Brutalist
- Location: Marylebone, City of Westminster, London, England
- Coordinates: 51.5156°N 0.1488°W
- Completed: 1970
- Demolished: 2019

Design and construction
- Architects: Michael Blampied and Partners

Welbeck Street car park was an architecturally notable car park built in the Brutalist style that was found in Marylebone, just north of Oxford Street, in the City of Westminster, London. The entrance was on the east side in Welbeck Street and it also bordered Henrietta Place in the south and Marylebone Lane in the west.

== Construction ==
The car park, designed by Michael Blampied and Partners, was completed in 1970 for the use of the nearby Debenhams store using a design of tessellated concrete polygons.

== Sale and demolition ==
In 2016, the site was sold to Shiva Hotels who were given permission to demolish the car park in 2017. Despite opposition from architects and The Twentieth Century Society, Historic England decided not to register the car park as a listed building and demolition of the structure began in October 2019.
