= Margaret Bentinck, Duchess of Portland =

British duchess (1715-1785)

Her Grace The Duchess of Portland
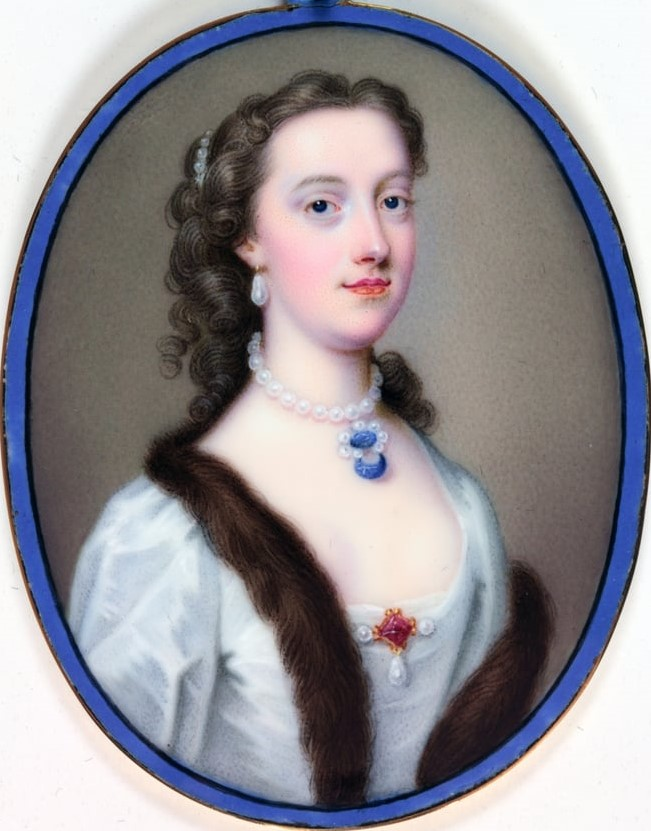
- Margaret Cavendish Bentinck, Duchess of Portland by Christian Friedrich Zincke, 1738

Personal details
- Born: 11 February 1715 Welbeck Abbey, Nottinghamshire
- Died: 17 July 1785 (aged 70) Bulstrode Park, Buckinghamshire
- Spouse: William Bentinck, 2nd Duke of Portland (m. 1734)
- Children: Elizabeth Thynne, Marchioness of Bath; Henrietta Grey, Countess of Stamford; William Cavendish-Bentinck, 3rd Duke of Portland; Lady Margaret Bentinck; Lady Frances Bentinck; Lord Edward Bentinck
- Parent(s): Edward Harley, 2nd Earl of Oxford and Mortimer; Lady Henrietta Holles
- Occupation: Art and natural history specimens collector

Margaret Cavendish Bentinck, Duchess of Portland (11 February 1715 – 17 July 1785) was the richest woman in Great Britain of her time, styled Lady Margaret Harley before 1734, Duchess of Portland from 1734 to her husband's death in 1761, and Dowager Duchess of Portland from 1761 until her own death in 1785.

The duchess, an heiress on a huge scale had the largest natural history collection in the country, complete with its own curator, the parson-naturalist John Lightfoot, and the Swedish botanist Daniel Solander. Her collection included costly art objects such as the Portland Vase. Her ambition for her collection was for it to contain and to describe every living species.

She was a member of the Blue Stockings Society, a group of social intellectuals led by women and founded by her great friend Elizabeth Montagu.

== Early life ==
She was the only surviving child of the 2nd Earl of Oxford and Mortimer, bibliophile, collector and patron of the arts; and the former Lady Henrietta Holles (1694–1755, the only child and heir of the 1st Duke of Newcastle-upon-Tyne and his wife, the former Lady Margaret Cavendish, daughter of 2nd Duke of Newcastle).

Lady Margaret grew up at Wimpole Hall in Cambridgeshire, surrounded by books, paintings, sculpture and in the company of writers such as Alexander Pope, Jonathan Swift and Matthew Prior as well as aristocrats and politicians. As a child, she collected pets and natural history objects (especially seashells) and was encouraged by her father and her paternal grandfather, the 1st Earl of Oxford and Mortimer, to do so.

== Marriage and issue ==
At 19, on 11 July 1734, in Oxford Chapel, Marylebone, she married the 2nd Duke of Portland, her 'Sweet Will', and they later had six children (all born at Welbeck Abbey):

1. Lady Elizabeth Bentinck (Welbeck Abbey, 27 June 1735 – 25 December 1825, London), who married Thomas Thynne, 1st Marquess of Bath (1734–1796)
2. Lady Henrietta Bentinck (8 February 1737 – 4 June 1827), who married George Grey, 5th Earl of Stamford (1737–1819)
3. William Henry Cavendish-Bentinck, 3rd Duke of Portland (14 April 1738 – 30 October 1809).
4. Lady Margaret Bentinck (26 July 1739 – 28 April 1756)
5. Lady Frances Bentinck (9 April 1741 – March 1743)
6. Lord Edward Charles Cavendish-Bentinck (3 March 1744 – 8 October 1819), married Elizabeth Cumberland (d. 1837)

In 1738–1756 the scholar Elizabeth Elstob was their tutor.

== As a collector ==
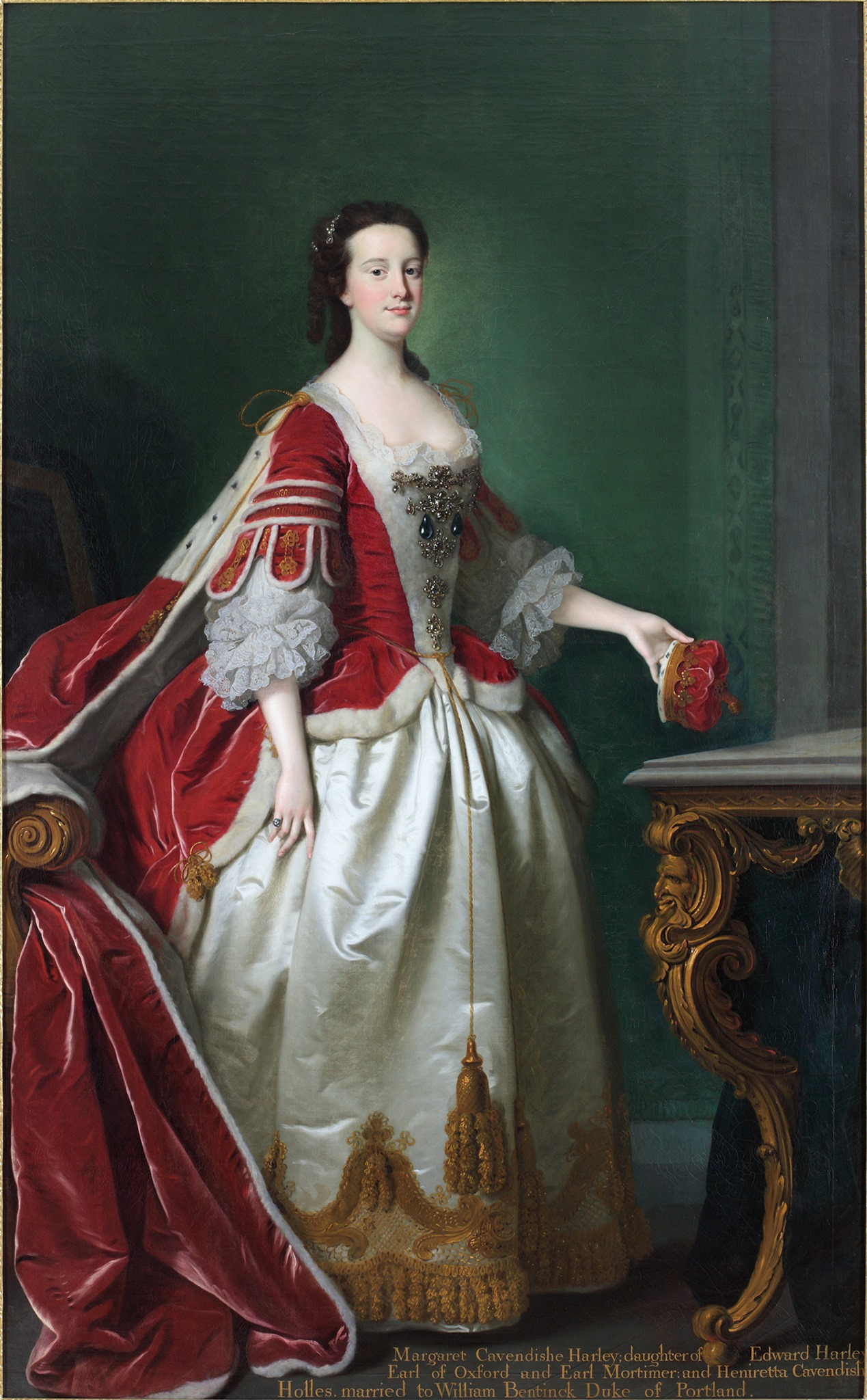
Portrait c. 1744 by Thomas Hudson

By the November following her marriage, her collecting had gathered pace, expanding to include the decorative and fine arts as well as natural history. (She was already heiress to the Arundel collection.) Her home in Buckinghamshire, Bulstrode Hall, provided space to house the results, and her independent fortune meant that cost was no object (on her mother's death in 1755 she also inherited the estates of Welbeck in Nottinghamshire). Bulstrode was known in court circles as "The Hive" for the intense work done there on the collections by the Duchess and her team of botanists, entomologists and ornithologists, headed by herself, Daniel Solander (1736–82, specialising in seashells and insects) and The Revd John Lightfoot (1735–88, her librarian and chaplain, and an expert botanist). Her collection was, unlike many similar contemporary ones, well-curated.

In 1766, the Genevan Romantic and philosopher Jean-Jacques Rousseau met Bentinck, admired her knowledge of botany, despite his opinion that women could not be scientific, and offered his services as her "herborist" (plant collector). She corresponded with Rousseau until she sent him a copy of Georg Rumpf's Herbarium amboinense, a botany of Amboyna in what is now Indonesia, as he felt this opposed his ideal of free nature.

The Portland Museum at Bulstrode was open to visitors, along with its zoo, aviary and vast botanic garden. Many came: scholars, philosophers, scientists and even royalty, and the collection became a cause célèbre. Her fellow collector Horace Walpole commented on it:

Few men have rivalled Margaret Cavendish in the mania of collecting, and perhaps no woman. In an age of great collectors she rivalled the greatest.

or, in the words of Mrs Delany (a botanical artist and longtime friend):

Surely an application to natural beauties must enlarge the mind? This house with all belonging to it is a noble school for contemplations!

Her collecting was also encouraged by her creative milieu: the Duchess and Mary Delany were both members of The Bluestockings, a group of aristocratic women seeking increased intellectual opportunities for members of their sex.

Her natural collection was the largest and most famous of its time, with few geographical bounds; it included objects from both Lapland and the South Seas (she patronised James Cook and bought shells from his second voyage through dealers). She drew and recorded its specimens, sorting them innovatively in type species and displaying them alongside ancient remains such as the Portland Vase, which she bought from Sir William Hamilton.

Lightfoot later wrote in the introduction to the 1786 auction catalogue that it was her "intention to have had every unknown species in the three kingdoms of nature described and published to the world", but this was thwarted by Solander's death in 1783 and her own two years later. On her death, with her children uninterested in the collection, her son's political career to finance and her creditors' demands to be paid, it was her will that it be sold. The collection was entirely dissolved at an auction of over 4,000 lots at her Whitehall residence from 24 April to 3 July 1786. Hundreds of people attended, although some fine and decorative arts were bought back by her family at the auction, including the Portland Vase and pieces from a silver-gilt dessert service the Duchess had designed herself, crawling with exquisitely modelled insects. However, the vast majority went, including the whole natural history collection; Walpole records that only eight days included items other than "shells, ores, fossils, birds' eggs and natural history." Only fragments of the Portland Museum's building survive too, since Bulstrode was demolished in the 19th century.

The department of Manuscripts and Special Collections, The University of Nottingham holds some of the personal papers and correspondence of the Duchess of Portland (Pw E), as part of the Portland (Welbeck) Collection. The Harley Gallery's Treasury Museum shows changing displays of objects from the Portland Collection.

== Foundling Hospital ==
The duchess was one of the twenty-one Signatories to the Ladies' Petition for the Establishment of the Foundling Hospital. These 'ladies of quality and distinction' supported Thomas Coram's campaign to create England's first Foundling Hospital; she signed his petition to King George II on 7 May 1735. Their recognition of the need for a home for orphans and abandoned children was crucial in encouraging male relatives to support Coram's project. As a result of their influence, he gained signatures from the nobility, professionals, gentlemen and the judiciary for two further petitions in 1737. A Royal Charter was granted in 1739 to which her husband, William Bentinck, was one of the first signatories. Her father, Edward Harley, signed Coram's gentlemen's petition on the same day.

== Legacy ==
Margaret Street in central London is named after her.

== See also ==
- List of natural history dealers

== Bibliography ==
- R. G. W. Anderson (ed.), Enlightening the British: Knowledge, Discovery and the Museum in the Eighteenth Century, ISBN 0-7141-5010-X
- Madeleine Pelling, 'Collecting the World: Female Friendship and Domestic Craft at Bulstrode Park' in Journal for Eighteenth-Century Studies, vol. 41, no. 1 (2018), pp. 101–20.
- Madeleine Pelling, 'Selling the Duchess: Narratives of Celebrity in 'A Catalogue of the Portland Museum (1786)' in Early Modern Women, vol. 13 no. 2 (Spring, 2019), pp. 3–32, ISBN 978-0-86698-864-3
- Rebecca Stott, Duchess of Curiosities, The Life of Margaret, Duchess of Portland (The Harley Gallery, Worksop, 2006).
