= The Spanish Friar =

Restoration tragicomedy by John Dryden

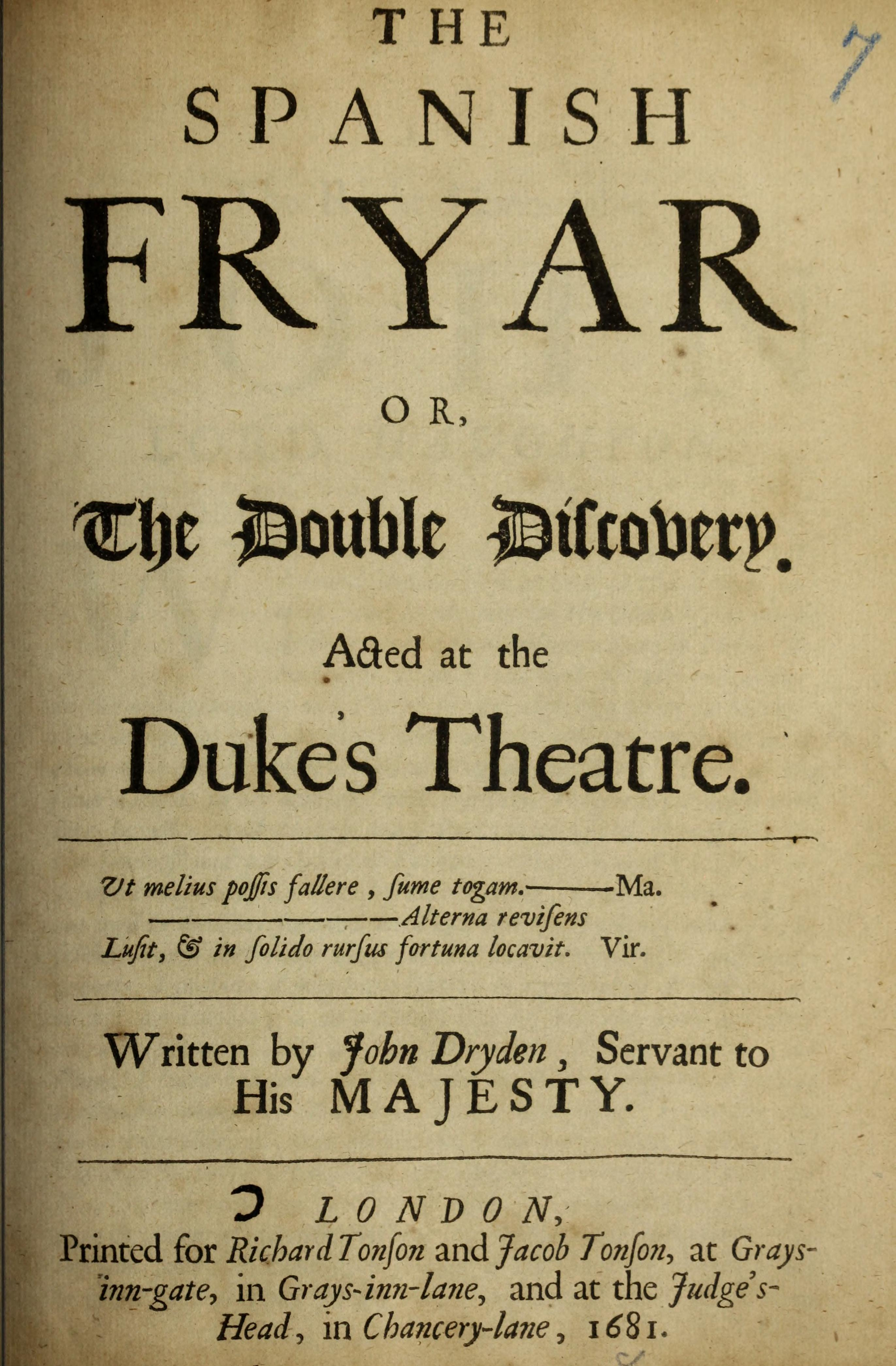
- Title page of the first edition (1681)
- Written by: John Dryden
- Genre: Tragicomedy

Premiere
- Date: 1681

The Spanish Friar, or the Double Discovery is a tragicomedy by John Dryden, produced and published in 1681.

== Characters ==
- Torrismond, Son of Sancho, the deposed King, believing himself Son of Raymond.
- Bertran, a Prince of the blood.
- Alphonso, a general Officer, Brother to Raymond.
- Lorenzo, his Son.
- Raymond, a Nobleman, supposed Father of Torrismond.
- Pedro, an Officer.
- Gomez, an old Usurer.
- Dominick, the Spanish Friar.
- Leonora, Queen of Arragon.
- Teresa, Woman to Leonora.
- Elvira, Wife to Gomez.

== Plot ==
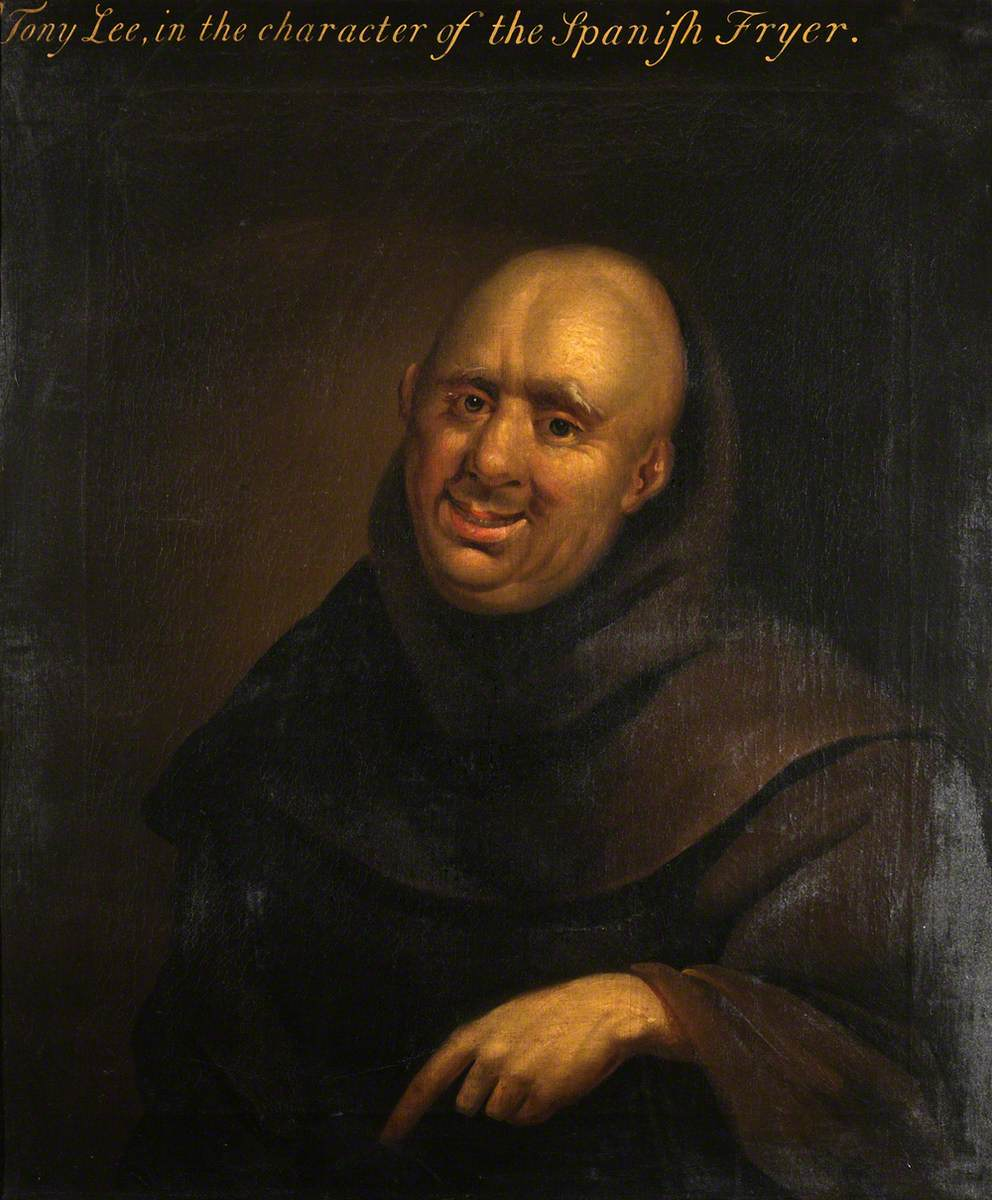
Egbert van Heemskerk II: Tony Lee, in the character of the Spanish Fryer (c. 1700)

The tragic part of the plot concerns a usurpation. Torrismond is, unknowingly, the rightful heir to the Spanish throne. He secretly marries Leonora, the unlawful queen, under whose reign Torrismond's father, the true king, has been killed in gaol.

The comic sub‐plot is commanded by the presence of Father Dominic, the eponymous friar, a corpulent and corrupt official who speaks the language of Dissenters and procures women for the hedonistic and politically liberal Lorenzo. Ironically, it is only through Lorenzo's agency that Torrismond is restored. The girl Lorenzo has been pursuing is revealed to be his sister.

== History ==
The Spanish Friar appears to have been brought out shortly after Thomas Thynne's murder, which is alluded to in the Prologue, probably early in 1681–2. The whimsical caricature, which it presented to the public, in Father Dominic, was received with rapture by the prejudiced spectators, who thought nothing could be exaggerated in the character of a Roman Catholic priest. Yet, the satire was still more severe in the first edition, and afterwards considerably softened. (Note: The Revolter, a tragicomedy, 1687, p. 29.)

It was, as Dryden himself calls it, a Protestant play; Jeremy Collier says it was rare Protestant diversion, and much for the credit of the Reformation. Dryden dedicated the play to his patron, Lord Houghton, with the words "a Protestant play to a Protestant patron". Accordingly, the Spanish Friar was the only play prohibited by James II after his accession.

After the Revolution, the Spanish Friar was the first play represented by order of Mary II, and honoured with her presence; a choice, of which she had abundant reason to repent, as the serious part of the piece gave as much scope for malicious application against herself, as the comic against the religion of her father. An account of the public reaction, with some other particulars, is contained in a letter from the Earl of Nottingham, published by Sir John Dalrymple, from a copy given him by the Bishop of Dromore:

The only day her Majesty gave herself the diversion of a play, and that on which she designed to see another, has furnished the town with discourse for near a month. The choice of the play was The Spanish Friar, the only play forbid by the late K[ing], Some unhappy expressions, among which those that follow, put her in some disorder, and forced her to hold up her fan, and often look behind her, and call for her palatine and hood, and any thing she could next think of; while those who were in the pit before her, turned their heads over their shoulders, and all in general directed their looks towards her, whenever their fancy led them to make any application of what was said. In one place, where the queen of Arragon is going to church in procession, 'tis said by a spectator, 'Very good; she usurps the throne, keeps the old king in prison, and, at the same time, is praying for a blessing on her army;'—And when said, 'That 'tis observed at Court, who weeps, and who wears black for good king Sancho's death,' 'tis said, 'Who is that, that can flatter a Court like this? Can I sooth tyranny? seem pleas'd to see my Royal Master murthered; his crown usurped; a distaff in the throne?'—And 'What title has this queen, but lawless force; and force must pull her down'—Twenty more things are said, which may be wrested to what they were never designed: but however, the observations then made furnished the town with talk, till something else happened, which gave it much occasion for discourse; for another play being ordered to be acted, the queen came not, being taken up with other diversion. She dined with Mrs Gradens, the famous woman in the hall, that sells fine laces and head-dresses; from thence she went to the Jew's, that sells Indian things; to Mrs Ferguson's, De Vett's, Mrs Harrison's, and other Indian houses; but not to Mrs Potter's, though in her way; which caused Mrs Potter to say, that she might as well have hoped for that honour as others, considering that the whole design of bringing the queen and king was managed at her house, and the consultations held there; so that she might as well have thrown away a little money in raffling there, as well as at the other houses: but it seems that my lord Devonshire has got Mrs Potter to be laundress: she has not much countenance of the queen, her daughter still keeping the Indian house her mother had. The same day the queen went to one Mrs Wise's, a famous woman for telling fortunes, but could not prevail with her to tell anything; though to others she has been very true, and has foretold that king James shall came in again, and the duke of Norfolk shall lose his head: the last, I suppose, will naturally be the consequence of the first. These things, however innocent, have passed the censure of the town: and, besides a private reprimand given, the king gave one in public; saying to the queen, that he heard she dined at a bawdy-house, and desired the next time she went, he might go. She said, she had done nothing but what the late queen had done. He asked her, if she meant to make her, her example. More was said on this occasion than ever was known before; but it was borne with all the submission of a good wife, who leaves all to the direction of the k——, and diverts herself with walking six or seven miles a-day, and looking after her buildings, making of fringes, and such like innocent things; and does not meddle in government, though she has better title to do it than the late queen had.

== Bibliography ==
- Birch, Dinah, ed. (2009). "Spanish Friar, The". In The Oxford Companion to English Literature. Oxford University Press. Oxford Reference.
- Coltharp, Duane (1999). "Patriarchalism at Risk in "The Spanish Fryar"". SEL: Studies in English Literature 1500–1900, 39(3): pp. 427–441.
- Scott, Walter, ed. (1808). The Works of John Dryden, Now First Collected in Eighteen Volumes. Vol. 6. Edinburgh: Printed for William Miller by James Ballantyne and Co. pp. 365–486.
- The Spanish fryar, or, The double discovery acted at the Duke's Theatre / written by John Dryden …. London: Printed for Richard Tonson and Jacob Tonson ..., 1681.
