= Margaret Holles, Duchess of Newcastle-upon-Tyne =

English noblewoman

Her Grace The Duchess of Newcastle-upon-Tyne

Duchess consort of Newcastle-upon-Tyne
- Tenure: 1694–1711
- Born: Margaret Cavendish; 22 October 1661
- Died: 24 December 1715/16; London, England
- Buried: Bolsover Castle
- Noble family: Cavendish
- Spouse: John Holles, 1st Duke of Newcastle
- Issue: Henrietta Harley, Countess of Oxford and Countess Mortimer
- Father: Henry Cavendish, 2nd Duke of Newcastle
- Mother: Frances Pierrepoint

Margaret Holles, Duchess of Newcastle-upon-Tyne (née Cavendish; 22 October 1661 – 24 December 1715/16, London) was an English noblewoman.

Margaret was born the third daughter and fourth of six children of Henry Cavendish, 2nd Duke of Newcastle-upon-Tyne and his wife, Frances Pierrepoint.

On 1 March 1690, she married John Holles, Earl of Clare. Her husband was created Duke of Newcastle in 1694, the first creation having become extinct in 1691 when her father died without a male heir (her only brother, Henry Cavendish, Earl of Ogle, died in 1680). They had one child, Lady Henrietta Cavendish Holles (1694–1755), who married the 2nd Earl of Oxford and Mortimer and was mother to Margaret Bentinck, Duchess of Portland.

She died in 1715/16 and was buried at Bolsover Castle.
