= John Holles, 1st Duke of Newcastle =

British peer (1662–1711)

His Grace The Duke of Newcastle KG PC
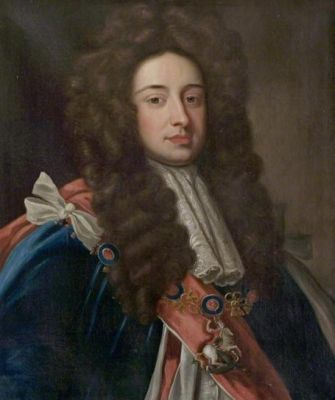
- Holles, Duke of Newcastle-upon-Tyne

Lord Privy Seal
- In office 1705–1711
- Monarch: Anne
- Preceded by: The Duke of Buckingham and Normanby
- Succeeded by: John Robinson

Personal details
- Born: 9 January 1662
- Died: 15 July 1711 (aged 49)
- Spouse: Lady Margaret Cavendish
- Parent(s): Gilbert Holles, 3rd Earl of Clare; Grace Pierrepont
- Relatives: Henry Cavendish, 2nd Duke of Newcastle-upon-Tyne (father-in-law)

John Holles, 1st Duke of Newcastle MP (9 January 1662 – 15 July 1711) was an English peer and politician. He was styled Lord Houghton from 1666 until he became Earl of Clare in 1689. He was created Duke of Newcastle in 1694 in recognition of his loyalty to the Williamite regime, and later served as Lord Privy Seal.

== Early life ==
Holles was born in Edwinstowe, Nottinghamshire, the son of the 3rd Earl of Clare and his wife Grace Pierrepont. Grace was a daughter of The Hon. William Pierrepont and granddaughter of the 1st Earl of Kingston-upon-Hull. He was a patron of John Dryden and in 1681 the playwright dedicated The Spanish Friar to Holles with the words "a Protestant play to a Protestant patron".

== Politics ==
Holles was hostile to James II's regime and was in contact with Everhard van Weede Dijkvelt in 1687. As such, he was a supporter of William of Orange and Mary Stuart during the Glorious Revolution, and in November 1688 waited on William as a representative of the risings in York and Nottingham.

Holles was elected MP for Nottinghamshire as Lord Houghton on 14 January 1689, but was called to the House of Lords two days later when his father died and he became the 4th Earl of Clare. He became a Gentleman of the Bedchamber to William III and was appointed a justice of the peace, Custos Rotulorum of Middlesex and Lord Lieutenant of Middlesex in 1689. He was created the Duke of Newcastle-upon-Tyne, of the 2nd creation, in 1694. The Duke of Newcastle-upon-Tyne is a title which was created three times in British history. The first creation had become extinct when his father-in-law Henry Cavendish, 2nd Duke of Newcastle-upon-Tyne, died without a male heir. On 30 May 1698, he was appointed Knight of the Order of the Garter. In 1699 he was appointed Governor of Kingston-upon-Hull. As Lord Lieutenant of Nottinghamshire he took personal command of the Nottinghamshire Militia.

Described in the The History of Parliament as a "vapouring and wealthy Whig", in 1705 he was appointed Lord Privy Seal and he was sworn of the Privy Council of England on 29 March the same year. In 1706, he was among the commissioners tasked with negotiating the Acts of Union 1707 with Scotland. Despite his limited administrative ability, by this stage Holles was very influential and controlled at least ten members of parliament. He was retained in his offices by the Harley ministry following the 1710 British general election, but died the following year.

== Family ==
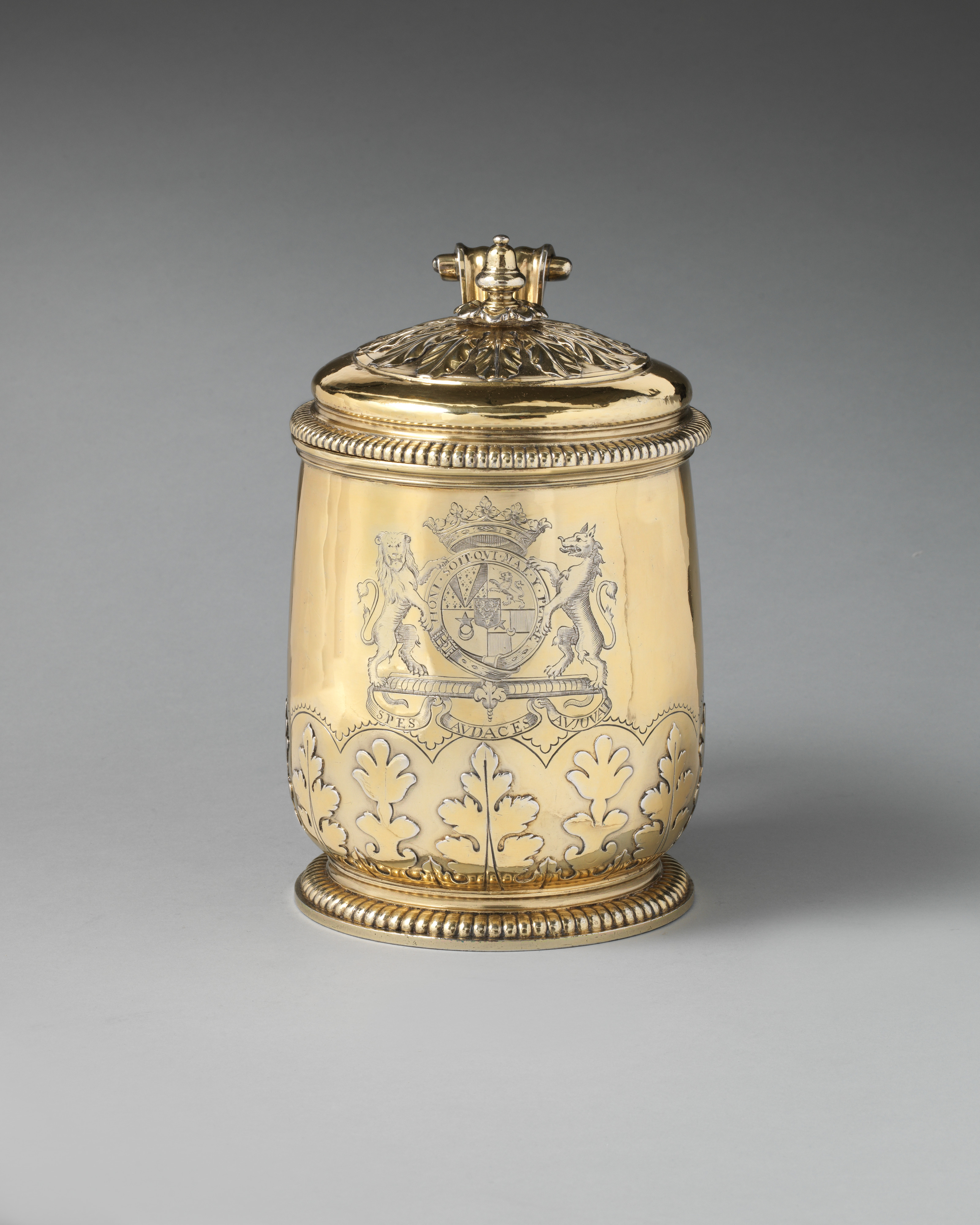
Tankard with the arms, supporters, coronet, and motto of Holles

On 1 March 1690, Holles married his first cousin, Lady Margaret Cavendish, a daughter of Henry Cavendish, 2nd Duke of Newcastle. As his favourite daughter, she was the heiress of all of the duke's estates in the East Midlands and Northumberland. This inheritance was subsequently challenged unsuccessfully by Lady Margaret's sisters. Holles inherited more estates from his relative, Denzil Holles, 3rd Baron Holles. By 1694, his income was reckoned to be £40,000 per year.

Holles and Cavendish had one child, Lady Henrietta Cavendish Holles (1694–1755), who married the 2nd Earl of Oxford and Mortimer and was mother to Margaret Bentinck, Duchess of Portland.

In 1710 he purchased Wimpole Estate in Cambridgeshire and the Manor of Marylebone. The Marylebone lands passed to his son-in-law Harley who named Holles Street in his memory.

A rivalry was formed between Holles and his sister, Elizabeth, when she married Christopher Vane, 1st Baron Barnard.

== Death ==
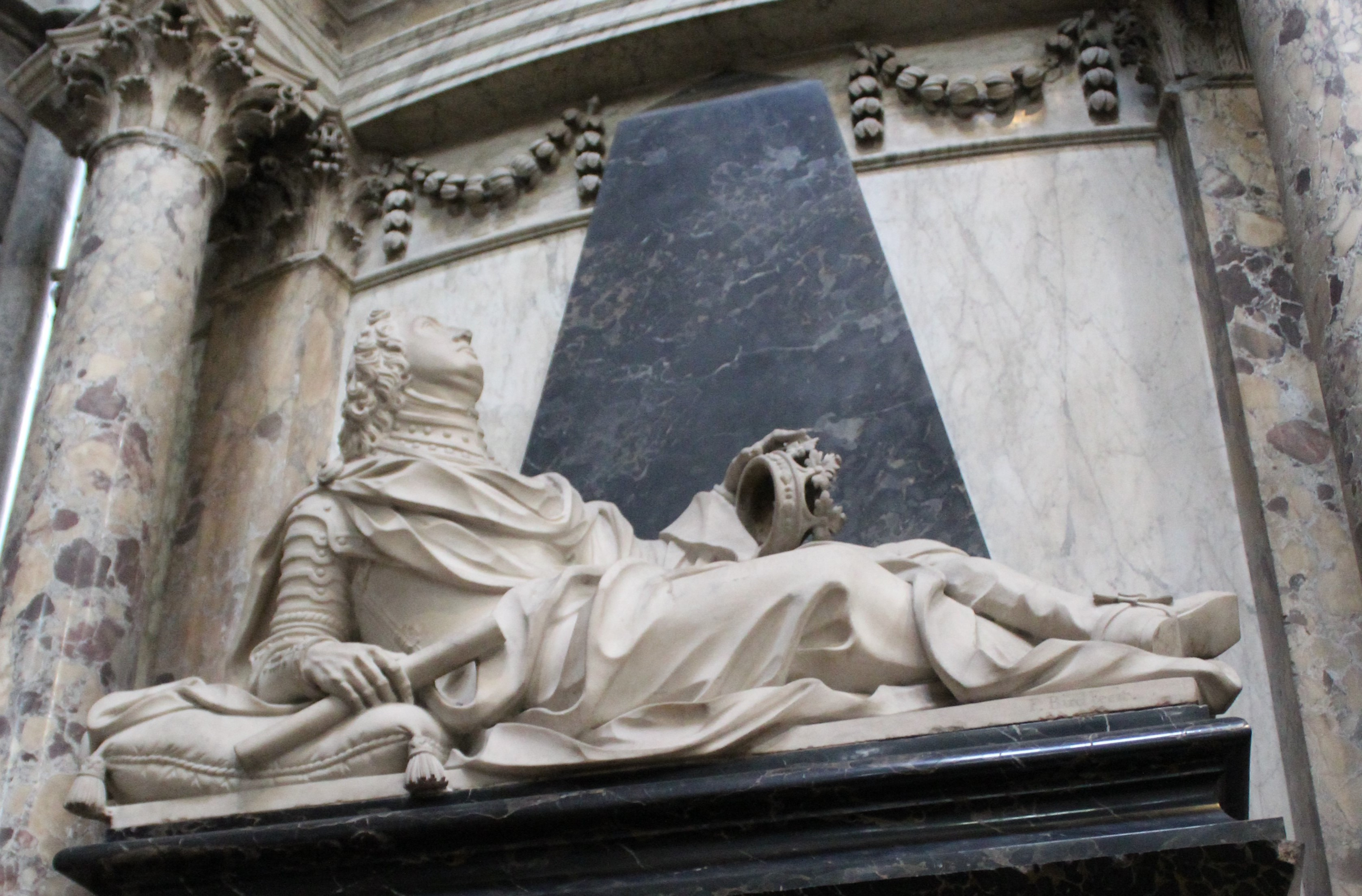
Detail of the monument to Holles in Westminster Abbey

The duke died in 1711 from injuries received in a fall from his horse while hunting near Welbeck. He left his Cavendish estates to his son-in-law, Edward Harley (later 2nd Earl of Oxford and Earl Mortimer) and the remainder of his property to his nephew Thomas Pelham, subsequently 1st Duke of Newcastle (third creation) and prime minister. He was buried on 9 August 1711 in St. John's Chapel in Westminster Abbey. A large monument to Holles stands in the north transept of the abbey. Designed by James Gibbs and carved by Francis Bird with the aid of John Michael Rysbrack, it consists of a reclining figure of Holles flanked by statues representing Wisdom and Sincerity.

== Records ==
Correspondence and estate records of John Holles, including letters to his wife, are held at the department of Manuscripts and Special Collections, The University of Nottingham, principally in the Holles Papers (Pw 2), part of the Portland (Welbeck) Collection.

== Coat of arms ==
Coat of arms of John Holles, 1st Duke of Newcastle
Coronet A coronet of a Duke. Crest A boar passant azure tusked and bristled or (not shown here). Escutcheon As based on his grace's Garter stall plate: Quarterly of twelve, 1st Ermine two piles conjoined Sable (Holles); 2nd Argent a lion rampant Gules a crescent Or for difference (Ashley); 3rd Argent on a chevron between three crosses crosslet Sable three crescents Argent (Scopham); 4th quarterly Or and Gules overall on a bend Sable three crosses pattee fitchee Argent (Hanham); 5th Sable between the horns of a crescent a mullet Argent (Denzell); 6th Argent a chevron between three blackamoors' heads couped Sable (Wenlock); 7th Argent three chevronels Sable (Archdeacon); 8th Argent a saltire Sable between twelve cherries Gules slipped Vert (Sergeaux); 9th quarterly Gules and Or in the first quarter a mullet Argent a crescent for difference on the centre point Sable (de Vere); 10th Vert a lion rampant Argent vulned on the shoulder Gules (Bolebec); 11th barry wavy of six Argent and Azure (Sanford); 12th Argent a fess between two bars gemel Gules (Badlesmere); overall an inescutcheon of pretence Sable three stags' heads cabossed Argent attired Or (Cavendish). Supporters Dexter: a lion or; sinister, a tiger or (not shown here). Motto Spes audaces adjuvat (not shown here).

Political offices
Preceded by The Duke of Buckingham and Normanby	Lord Privy Seal; 1705–1711	Succeeded by The Bishop of Bristol
Military offices
Preceded by The Marquess of Carmarthen	Governor of Kingston-upon-Hull; 1699–1711	Succeeded by Richard Sutton
Legal offices
Preceded by The Duke of Devonshire	Justice in Eyre north of the Trent; 1711	Succeeded by The Duke of Leeds
Honorary titles
Preceded by The Earl of Craven	Lord Lieutenant of Middlesex; 1689–1692	Succeeded by The Earl of Bedford
Preceded by The Earl of Craven	Custos Rotulorum of Middlesex; 1689–1692	Succeeded by The Earl of Bedford
Preceded by The Duke of Devonshire	Lord Lieutenant of Nottinghamshire; 1694–1711	Vacant Title next held by The Earl of Clare
Vacant Title last held by The Earl of Kingston-upon-Hull	Custos Rotulorum of Nottinghamshire; 1694–1711	Vacant Title next held by The Earl of Clare
Preceded by The Duke of Leeds	Lord Lieutenant of the East Riding of Yorkshire; 1699–1711	Vacant Title next held by Marquess of Carmarthen
Preceded by The Duke of Leeds	Custos Rotulorum of the East Riding of Yorkshire; 1699–1711	Succeeded by Marquess of Carmarthen
Preceded by The Duke of Buckingham and Normanby	Lord Lieutenant of the North Riding of Yorkshire; 1705–1711	Succeeded by The Duke of Buckingham and Normanby
Peerage of England
New creation Title last held by Henry Cavendish	Duke of Newcastle-upon-Tyne; 2nd creation 1694–1711	Extinct
Preceded by Gilbert Holles	Earl of Clare; 1689–1711	Extinct
