= Henrietta Harley, Countess of Oxford and Countess Mortimer =

English noblewoman

The Right Honourable Countess of Oxford and Countess Mortimer
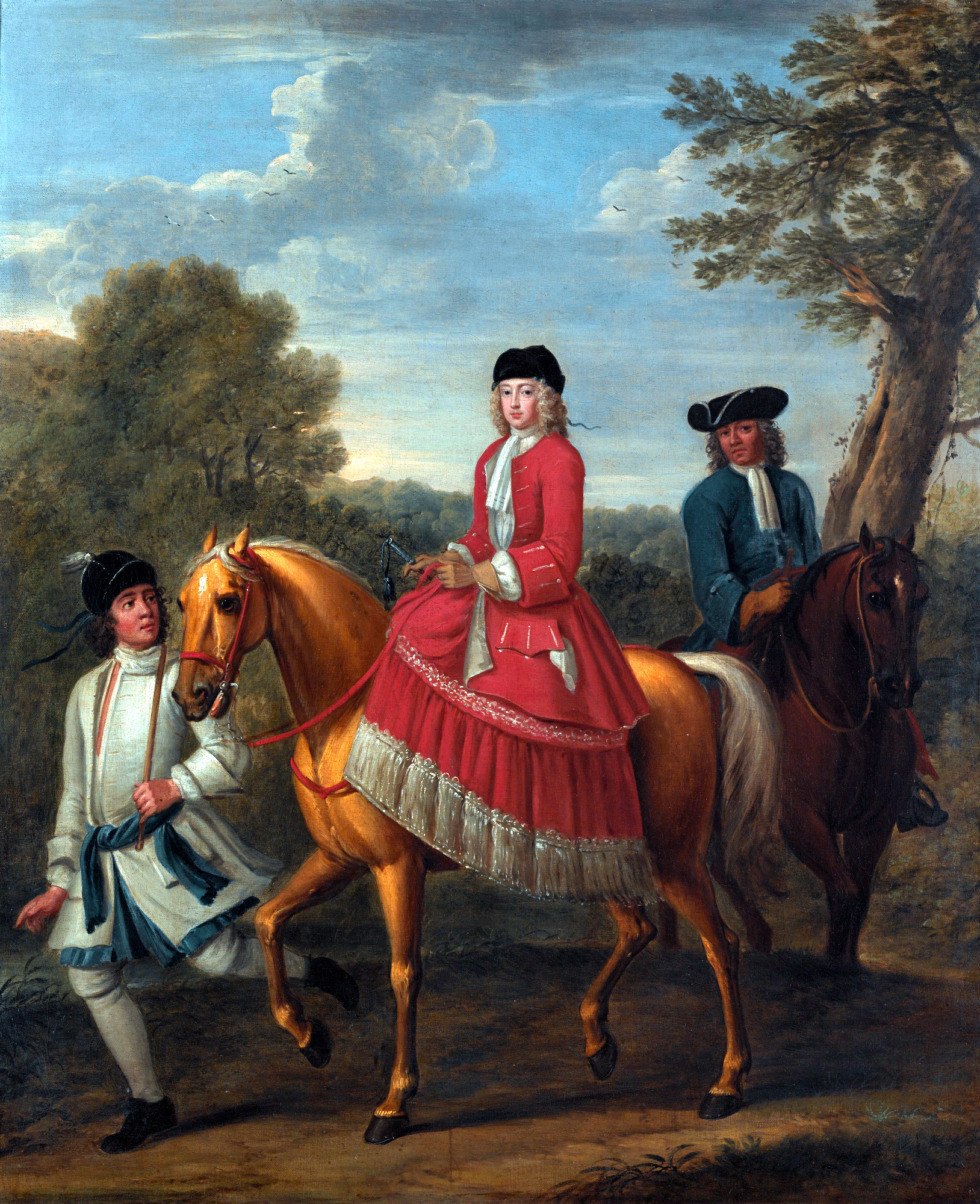
- Henrietta Harley, Countess of Oxford and Countess Mortimer (1694–1755), by John Wootton
- Born: Lady Henrietta Cavendish Holles; 11 February 1694
- Died: 9 December 1755 (aged 61)
- Buried: Westminster Abbey
- Spouse: Edward Harley, 2nd Earl of Oxford and Earl Mortimer (m. 1713; died 1741)
- Issue: Henry Cavendish Harley, Lord Harley; Margaret Bentinck, Duchess of Portland
- Parents: John Holles, 1st Duke of Newcastle; Lady Margaret Cavendish

Henrietta Harley, Countess of Oxford and Countess Mortimer (née Lady Henrietta Cavendish Holles; 11 February 1694 – 9 December 1755) was an English noblewoman, the only child and heiress of John Holles, 1st Duke of Newcastle and his wife, the former Lady Margaret Cavendish, daughter of Henry Cavendish, 2nd Duke of Newcastle-upon-Tyne.

Her hand was sought in marriage even in her youth as a means of alliance with her powerful father. Suitors included the Intendant of the Court of a Count of the Holy Roman Empire in December 1703, the Elector of Hanover's son (later George I of Great Britain) in June 1706, the Duke of Somerset's son Lord Hertford in 1707–1711, Count Nassau in 1709, and finally Lord Danby (grandson of Thomas Osborne, 1st Duke of Leeds) in 1711, before her father settled on Edward Harley, 2nd Earl of Oxford and Earl Mortimer. They were married on 31 August 1713, at Wimpole Hall. She brought, through inheritance, Welbeck Abbey in Nottinghamshire, Bolsover Castle and Wimpole Hall in Cambridgeshire to her husband.

They had two children. Their son, Henry Cavendish Harley, Lord Harley, lived only four days. Their only child to attain maturity was Margaret (1715–1785), and so whilst Margaret inherited most of the combined Holles-Harley fortunes on her parents' deaths, the title of Earl of Oxford and Earl Mortimer passed to Edward's cousin (also Edward).

Henrietta Place (previously Henrietta Street) in Marylebone in the City of Westminster in central London was named after the Countess. Nearby Harley Street was named after her husband. The general area was owned by the Harleys and developed during their lifetimes, hence other streets are named after their family, too. This includes Oxford Street, Wigmore Street and Wimpole Street.

She was buried 26 December 1755 in the Duke of Newcastle's vault in Westminster Abbey.
