= Edward Harley, 2nd Earl of Oxford and Earl Mortimer =

British politician

The Right Honourable The Earl of Oxford and Earl Mortimer
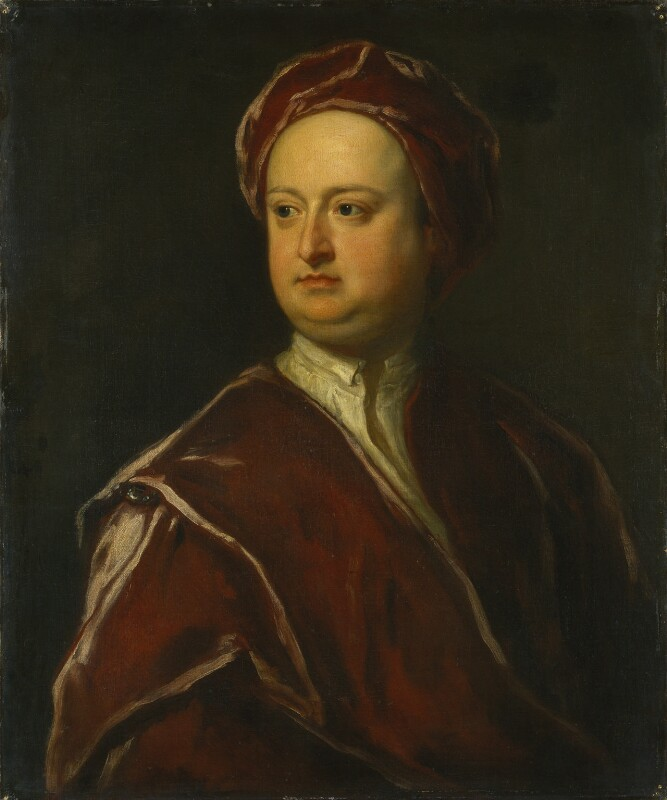

Member of Parliament for Radnor
- In office 1711–1714
- Preceded by: Robert Harley
- Succeeded by: Thomas Lewis

Member of Parliament for Cambridgeshire
- In office 1722–1724
- Preceded by: Sir Francis Whichcote; Sir Robert Clarke
- Succeeded by: Sir John Hynde Cotton; Samuel Shepheard

Personal details
- Born: 2 June 1689 England
- Died: 16 June 1741 (aged 52) England
- Spouse: Lady Henrietta Cavendish Holles (m. 1713)
- Children: 2, including Margaret
- Parent(s): Robert Harley, 1st Earl of Oxford and Earl Mortimer; Elizabeth Foley

Edward Harley, 2nd Earl of Oxford and Earl Mortimer (2 June 1689 – 16 June 1741) was a British Tory politician who represented Radnor and Cambridgeshire in the House of Commons of Great Britain between 1711 and 1724.

== Early life ==
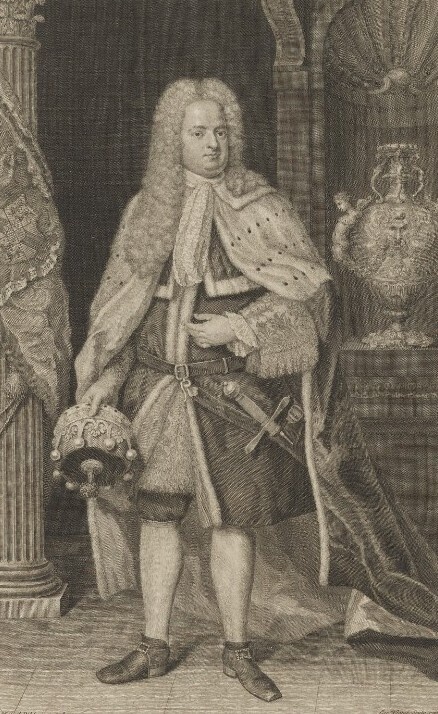
Engraving of Lord Oxford and Lord Mortimer wearing the robes of the British peerage.

Edward Harley was born on 2 June 1689. He was the only son of Robert Harley, 1st Earl of Oxford and Earl Mortimer and his first wife Elizabeth Foley.

== Political career ==
He was MP for Radnor (as his father and paternal grandfather had been before him) from 1711 to 1714, and for Cambridgeshire from 1722 until he succeeded his father in 1724 and entered the House of Lords. He was a bibliophile, collector and patron of the arts, and otherwise took little interest in public affairs. Harley's considerable collection of coins and medals – 520 lots in all – was auctioned by Christopher Cock at his house in the Great Piazza, Covent Garden over six days, from 18 March 1742.

He extended his father's library and expanded the Harleian Collection, now in the British Library, but a large part of his book collection was acquired by the Danish count Otto Thott, on whose death in 1785 much went to the Royal Library in Copenhagen. The department of Manuscripts and Special Collections, The University of Nottingham holds a number of papers relating to the 2nd Earl and the management of his estates in the Portland (London) collection. Harley family papers (Pw2Hy) are part of the Portland (Welbeck) Collection.

== London estate ==
Through his wife, he inherited Welbeck Abbey in Nottinghamshire, and Wimpole Hall in Cambridgeshire. Wimpole became their main residence, but they had to sell it in 1740 to pay Edward's debts. He also acquired a considerable amount of land in the West End of London which was developed during his life. Many of the now famous streets took their names from Harley connections – primarily Harley Street and Oxford Street. Other streets, named after Harley properties, include Wigmore Street and Wimpole Street.

== Family ==
On 31 August 1713 he married Lady Henrietta Cavendish Holles (1694–1755), only daughter and heir of the 1st Duke of Newcastle and his wife, the former Lady Margaret Cavendish, daughter of the 2nd Duke of Newcastle-upon-Tyne. They had two children:

- Lady Margaret Cavendish Harley (1715–1785), who married William Bentinck, 2nd Duke of Portland in 1734.
- Henry Cavendish Harley, Lord Harley (18 October 1725 – 22 October 1725)

Lord Oxford and Mortimer died in London in 1741 and was buried in the vault of the Duke of Newcastle in Westminster Abbey. He was succeeded in the earldom by his cousin Edward Harley, 3rd Earl of Oxford and Earl Mortimer.

Parliament of Great Britain
Preceded by Robert Harley	Member of Parliament for Radnor; 1711–1714	Succeeded by Thomas Lewis
Preceded by Sir Francis Whichcote; Sir Robert Clarke	Member of Parliament for Cambridgeshire; 1722–1724; With: Sir John Hynde Cotton	Succeeded by Sir John Hynde Cotton; Samuel Shepheard
Peerage of Great Britain
Preceded by Robert Harley	Earl of Oxford and Earl Mortimer; 1724–1741	Succeeded by Edward Harley
