= Portman =

Portman may refer to:

- Portman (surname)
- Viscount Portman

== Places ==
- Portmán, a town near Cartagena, Spain
- Orchard Portman, a village and civil parish in Somerset, England
- Portman Estate, 110 acres (45 hectares) in Marylebone in London’s West End
- Portman Road, a football stadium in Ipswich, Suffolk, England
- Port Mann Bridge, a bridge in British Columbia

== Other ==
- Battle of Portmán, an 1873 naval battle off Cartagena, Spain, during the Cantonal Rebellion
- Portman (burgess), a freeman or burgess of a port
- Portman 36, an American sailboat design

== See also ==
- Pforzheim
- Port
