= William Portman (disambiguation) =

William Portman (died 1557) was an English judge and Chief Justice of the King’s Bench.

William Portman may also refer to:

- William Portman (died c. 1413), MP for Taunton
- Sir William Portman, 5th Baronet (died 1646), English politician
- Sir William Portman, 6th Baronet (1643–1690), English politician
- William Portman (priest), Irish Anglican clergyman
