= Henry Portman (disambiguation) =

Henry Portman was a housing developer.

Henry Portman may also refer to:

- Henry Portman, 2nd Viscount Portman (1829–1919), English Liberal MP
- Henry Seymour Portman (1637–1728), English MP
- Henry Berkeley Portman, 3rd Viscount Portman (1860–1923)
- Sir Henry Portman, 2nd Baronet (died 1623) of the Portman baronets
