= Portman (surname) =

Portman is an English surname.

== Surname ==
- Maurice Vidal Portman, British doctor
- Bob Portman, American basketball player
- Eric Portman, English stage and film actor
- John C. Portman Jr., American architect and real estate developer
- Natalie Portman, Israeli actress
- Rachel Portman, British composer
- Stephen Portman, American conductor and pianist
- Rob Portman, American politician
- Sir William Portman (died 1557), English judge and Chief Justice of the King's Bench
- Adolf Portmann, Swiss Zoologist

== Viscount Portman ==
- Christopher Portman, 10th Viscount Portman, British real estate businessman
- Edward Portman, 1st Viscount Portman, British aristocrat
- Henry Portman, 2nd Viscount Portman, British politician

== Fictional characters ==
- Dean Portman, character in The Mighty Ducks film franchise.
- Jacob Portman, lead character in Ransom Riggs's novel Miss Peregrine's Home for Peculiar Children.
