= Portman baronets =

Extinct baronetcy in the Baronetage of England

Arms of Portman:Or, a fleur-de-lis azure

The Portman baronetcy, of Orchard Portman in the County of Somerset, was a title in the Baronetage of England. It was created on 25 November 1611 for John Portman (died 1612), son of Sir Henry Portman, knight (died 1590), of Orchard Portman, Somerset, by Jane Mitchell. Orchard Portman is two miles southeast of Taunton. Sir Henry was the son of Sir William Portman (died 1557), Lord Chief Justice of England between 1555 and 1557.

Sir William Portman had acquired land in Marylebone, London, which through the later housing developments of Henry William Portman became the Portman Estate, which today is one of Central London's largest landlords and is still the basis of the wealth of the Portman family. Sir Henry Portman, 2nd Baronet (died 1620–1 or 1623), was Member of Parliament for Somerset, and married Lady Anne Stanley, daughter of William Stanley, 6th Earl of Derby; they had no children. His heir was his brother Sir John Portman, 3rd Baronet (1605–1624), who died unmarried as a 19-year-old undergraduate at Wadham College, Oxford, in the chapel of which exists his elaborate marble monument containing his effigy. John's aunt Joan Portman was the wife of Sir John Wyndham (1558–1645) of Orchard Wyndham, Somerset, whose mother was Florence Wadham.Wadham College was founded in accordance with the wishes of her brother Nicholas Wadham. His brothers, the 4th and 5th Baronets, both represented Taunton in the House of Commons. The 6th Baronet was Member of Parliament for both Taunton and Somerset. The title became extinct on his death in 1690.

The family estates passed under a settlement to Henry Seymour, fifth son of Sir Edward Seymour, 3rd Baronet, of Berry Pomeroy, and Anne, the second daughter of Sir John Portman, 1st Baronet. He took the surname Portman, but left no issue. The property then devolved upon William Berkeley, of Pylle, who took the surname Portman. His great-grandson was Edward Berkeley Portman, Member of Parliament for Dorset, father of Edward Portman, 1st Viscount Portman. See Viscount Portman for later history of the family.

== Portman baronets, of Orchard (1611) ==
- Sir John Portman, 1st Baronet (died 1612)
- Sir Henry Portman, 2nd Baronet (died 1623) (son)
- Sir John Portman, 3rd Baronet (1605–1624) (brother)
- Sir Hugh Portman, 4th Baronet (died 1632) (brother)
- Sir William Portman, 5th Baronet (died 1645) (brother)
- Sir William Portman, 6th Baronet (died 1690) (son)

== See also ==
- Viscount Portman

Baronetage of England
Preceded by Sandys baronets	Portman baronets 25 November 1611	Succeeded by Englefield baronets
