= Maurice Portman =

Maurice Portman may refer to:

- Maurice Berkeley Portman (1833–1888), political figure in Canada West
- Maurice Vidal Portman (1860–1935), British naval officer
