= Viscount Portman =

Viscountcy in the Peerage of the United Kingdom

The arms of the Viscounts Portman quarter Portman of Orchard Portman (1st & 4th: Or, a fleur-de-lis azure) with Berkeley of Stoke Gifford (2nd & 3rd: Gules, a chevron ermine between ten crosses pattee argent)

Viscount Portman, in the County of Somerset, is a title in the Peerage of the United Kingdom. It was created on 28 March 1873, for the former Lord Lieutenant of Somerset and Liberal Member of Parliament Edward Portman, 1st Baron Portman. He had already been created Baron Portman, of Orchard Portman, on 27 January 1837, also in the Peerage of the United Kingdom. His son, the second Viscount, represented Shaftesbury and Dorset in the House of Commons as a Liberal. As of 2014, the titles have been held by one of the latter's great-great-grandsons, the tenth Viscount, since 1999.

The family post-1728 is descended in the male line from a junior line of Berkeley of Stoke Gifford, one of whom married the daughter of Joan Portman, the great-granddaughter of Sir William Portman, Lord Chief Justice of England, between 1555 and 1557. He acquired land in Marylebone, London, which developed under Henry William Portman into the Portman Estate, a cornerstone of the family's wealth. The judge's grandson was created a baronet in 1612 (see Portman baronets). In its third generation, when Sir William Portman, 6th Baronet, died in 1690 without progeny, the bulk of the estates passed to a husband of the family: Henry Seymour (d.1728), MP, 5th son of Sir Edward Seymour, 3rd Baronet of Berry Pomeroy, Devon (by coverture applying to his wife Anne Portman, second daughter of Sir John Portman, 1st Baronet). Seymour took the surname Portman in lieu of his patronymic, but left no issue. The property then devolved to another cousin, William Berkeley (d. 1737) of Pylle, Somerset, who likewise took the surname Portman. His great-grandson was Edward Berkeley Portman (1771–1823), MP for Dorset and father of Edward Portman, 1st Viscount Portman.

The family seat was Bryanston House, near Bryanston, Dorset, which has been a large private school since 1928.

== Viscounts Portman (1873) ==
- Edward Berkeley Portman, 1st Viscount Portman (1799–1888)
- Henry Berkeley Portman, 2nd Viscount Portman (1829–1919)
- Henry Berkeley Portman, 3rd Viscount Portman (1860–1923)
- Claud Berkeley Portman, 4th Viscount Portman (1864–1929)
- Edward Claud Berkeley Portman, 5th Viscount Portman (1898–1942) (Note: His probate was sworn in 1943 at £359,737 (equivalent to about £14,700,000 in 2025).)
- Seymour Berkeley Portman, 6th Viscount Portman (1868–1946) (Note: His probate was sworn in 1947 at £135,023 (equivalent to about £4,600,000 in 2025).)
- Gerald Berkeley Portman, 7th Viscount Portman (1875–1948) (Note: His probate was sworn in 1949 at £4,493,306 (equivalent to about £137,300,000 in 2025) including settled (entrusted) land.)
- Gerald William Berkeley Portman, 8th Viscount Portman (1903–1967) (Note: His probate was sworn, stating he is of Burtley House, Beaconsfield, in 1968 at £1,308,186 (equivalent to about £20,800,000 in 2025).)
- Edward Henry Berkeley Portman, 9th Viscount Portman (1934–1999)
- Christopher Edward Berkeley Portman, 10th Viscount Portman (b. 1958)

The heir apparent is the present holder's son the Hon. Luke Henry Oliver Richard Berkeley Portman (b. 1984).

== See also ==
- Portman baronets
- Portman Estate
