= Edwin Berkeley Portman =

English barrister and Liberal politician

Member of Parliament for North Dorset
- In office 9 December 1885 – 1 July 1892
- Preceded by: constituency established
- Succeeded by: John Wingfield Digby

Personal details
- Born: 3 August 1830 Bryanston, Dorset
- Died: 21 April 1921 (aged 90)
- Party: Liberal
- Parent(s): Edward Portman; Emma Portman
- Education: Rugby School
- Alma mater: Balliol College, Oxford

Edwin Berkeley Portman (3 August 1830 – 27 April 1921) was an English barrister and Liberal politician.

Portman was born at Bryanston, Dorset, the son of Edward Portman, 1st Viscount Portman and his wife Lady Emma Lascelles. He was educated at Rugby School and Balliol College, Oxford. He was called to the bar at Inner Temple in 1852.

In 1885 Portman was elected Member of Parliament for North Dorset. He lost the seat in 1892.

Parliament of the United Kingdom
New constituency	Member of Parliament for North Dorset; 1885 – 1892	Succeeded by John Wingfield-Digby
