= Pylle =

Village and civil parish in Somerset, England

Coordinates: 51.1443°N 2.5640°W

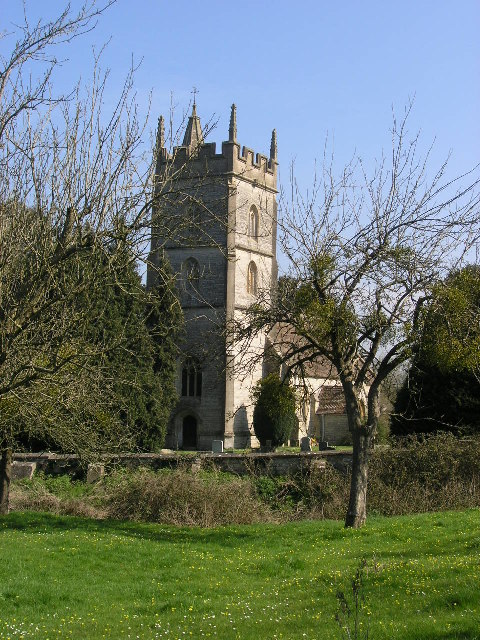
- Church of St Thomas à Becket

- Location within Somerset
- Population: 160 (2011)
- OS grid reference: ST605385
- Unitary authority: Somerset Council
- Ceremonial county: Somerset
- Region: South West
- Country: England
- Sovereign state: United Kingdom
- Post town: SHEPTON MALLET
- Postcode district: BA4
- Dialling code: 01749
- Police: Avon and Somerset
- Fire: Devon and Somerset
- Ambulance: South Western
- UK Parliament: Frome and East Somerset

Pylle is a village and civil parish 4 miles (6.4 km) south west of Shepton Mallet, and 7 miles (11.3 km) from Wells, in the county of Somerset, England. It has a population of 160. The parish includes the hamlet of Street on the Fosse.

The village is very close to the site of the Glastonbury Festival.

== History ==
At the time of the Domesday Book in 1086 the tenant was Serlo de Burci from whom the manor passed by 1303 to William FitzMartin. Pylle subsequently became a possession of the Berkeley family of Bruton Abbey in Somerset, a junior branch of Berkeley of Berkeley Castle in Gloucestershire. It was the paternal inheritance received by Sir Edward Berkeley (1580–1654), the third son of Sir Henry Berkeley (1541–1601) of Bruton. His grandson Edward Berkeley (c. 1644 – c. 1707), of Pylle, served three times as a Member of Parliament for Wells in Somerset. William Berkeley (d. 1737) of Pylle changed his surname by a private act of Parliament, Portman's Name Act 1735 (9 Geo. 2. c. 22 Pr.) to Portman on becoming heir to his distant cousin Sir William Portman, 6th Baronet (d. 1690) of Orchard Portman in Somerset. His descendant was Edward Berkeley Portman, 1st Viscount Portman (1799–1888).

Pylle fell within the tithing of Pylle, the hundred of Whitstone, the registration district of Mendip, previously within Shepton Mallet until 1936.

Pylle railway station was a station on the Highbridge branch of the Somerset and Dorset Joint Railway. It opened in 1862 and closed in 1966.

== Governance ==
The parish council has responsibility for local issues, including setting an annual precept (local rate) to cover the council’s operating costs and producing annual accounts for public scrutiny. The parish council evaluates local planning applications and works with the local police, district council officers, and neighbourhood watch groups on matters of crime, security, and traffic. The parish council's role also includes initiating projects for the maintenance and repair of parish facilities, as well as consulting with the district council on the maintenance, repair, and improvement of highways, drainage, footpaths, public transport, and street cleaning. Conservation matters (including trees and listed buildings) and environmental issues are also the responsibility of the council.

For local government purposes, since 1 April 2023, the parish comes under the unitary authority of Somerset Council. Prior to this, it was part of the non-metropolitan district of Mendip (established under the Local Government Act 1972). It was part of Shepton Mallet Rural District before 1974. It is also part of the Frome and East Somerset county constituency represented in the House of Commons of the Parliament of the United Kingdom. It elects one Member of Parliament (MP) by the first past the post system of election.

== Landmarks ==
Pylle Manor probably dates from the 17th century, with an 18th-century staircase, and is also listed as a Grade II* building.

== Religious sites ==
The Church of St Thomas à Becket was rebuilt in 1868 for the Portman family of Orchard Portman, but a 15th-century tower from the earlier church remains. It is designated as a Grade II* listed building.
