= Manchester Square =

Garden square in London, United Kingdom

Coordinates: 51°31′00″N 0°09′10″W

Manchester Square Improvement Act 1789
- Act of Parliament
- Parliament of Great Britain
- Long title: An Act for the Improvement of Manchester Square, within the Parish of Saint Mary-le-bone, in the County of Middlesex.
- Citation: 29 Geo. 3. c. 5
- Territorial extent: Great Britain

Dates
- Royal assent: 24 March 1789
- Commencement: 20 November 1788 (Note: Start of session.)

Status: Current legislation

Text of statute as originally enacted

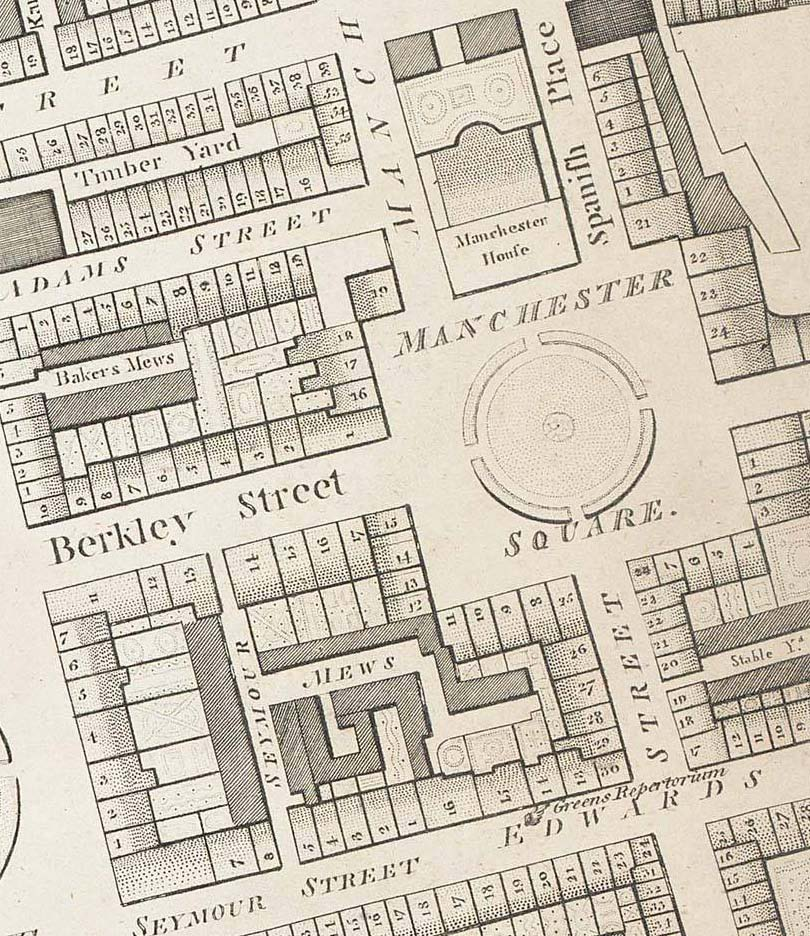
Manchester Square in the 1790s

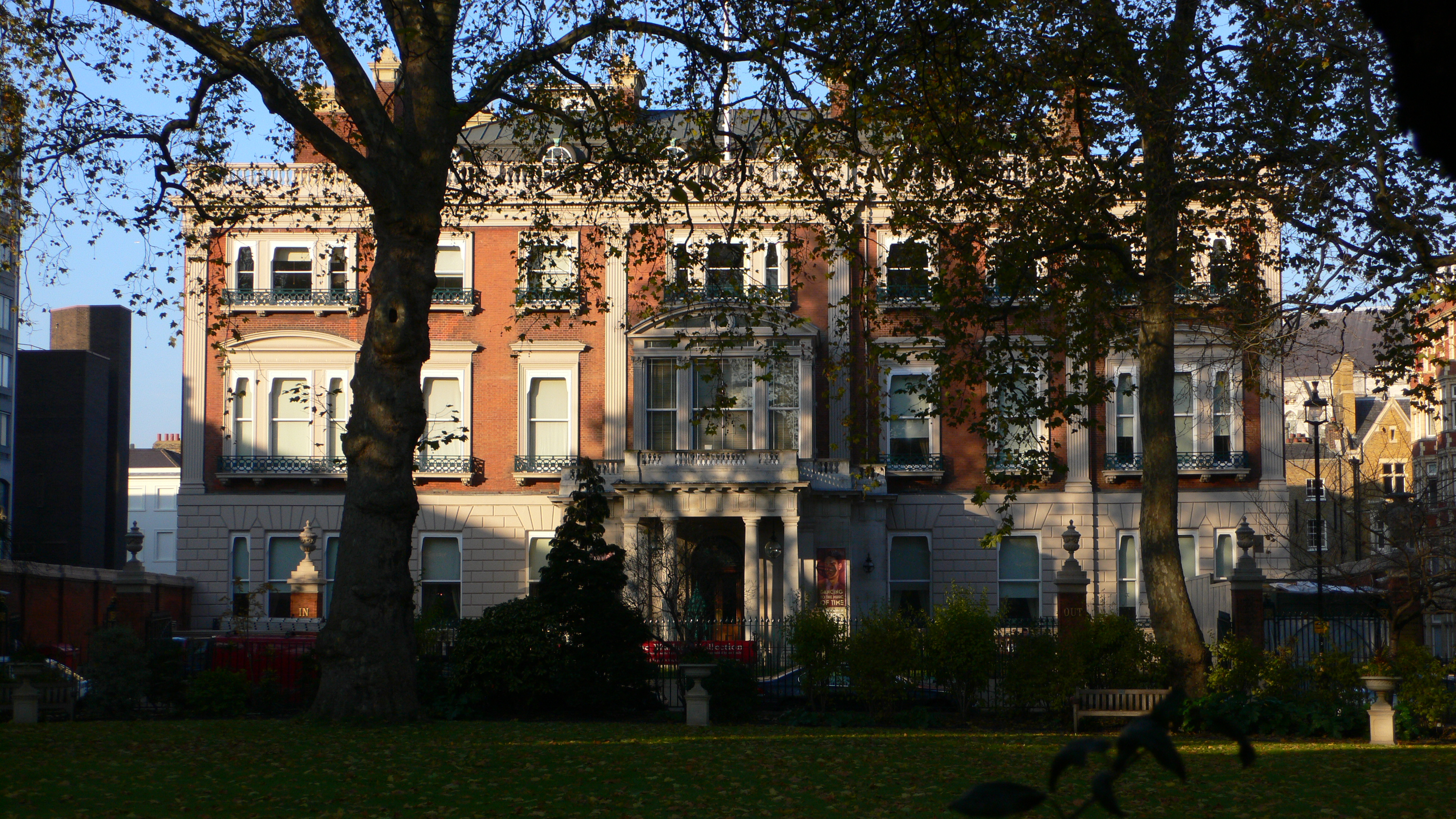
Hertford House, home of the Wallace Collection, viewed from the gardens in Manchester Square

Manchester Square is an 18th-century garden square in Marylebone, central London. Centred 950 feet (290 m) north of Oxford Street it measures 300 feet (91 m) internally north-to-south, and 280 feet (85 m) across. It is a small Georgian square, predominantly 1770s-designed. Construction began around 1776. The north side has a central mansion, Hertford House, which is flanked by approach ways. Its first name was Manchester House and since 1897 it has housed the Wallace Collection of fine and decorative arts. The square forms part of west Marylebone, most of which sees minor but overarching property interests held by one owner (through lease reversions managed as the Portman Estate). Many buildings have been recognised by statutory protection as listed buildings.

== Notable residents ==
Among residents figured:

- Admiral Sir Thomas Foley (1757–1833), and his noble wife (later widow) at № 1
- Julius Benedict (1804–1885), German-born composer, at № 2
- John Hughlings Jackson (1835–1911), English neurologist, at № 3
- Alfred, Lord Milner (1854–1925), British statesman and colonial administrator, at № 14
- Timothy Yeats Brown (1789–1858), British banker
- Edward Henry Sieveking (1816–1904), English physician
- Major-General Sir Richard Henry Havelock Charles, 1st Baronet, GCVO, KCSI (1858–1934), British medical doctor, and Serjeant Surgeon to King George V

== Listed buildings ==
- №s 1–3
- №s 4–7
- 1A Duke Street (has equal face to any lower numbers on this square)
- 2A Duke Street (as mentioned)
- №s 8–11
- №s 12–14
- Hertford House
- №s 22–25
- № 26

=== Spanish Place ===
This six-house long approach fronts the east side of Hertford House (or its small public front lawn with steps, benches and paths). The first five buildings of Spanish Place are those listed, in the mainstream, initial category of Grade II. They were built c.1780–90, associated with the Duke of Manchester's development of the square, on Portman land. Their materials are brown brick, recessed slate roofs above five varying-prominence storeys with 3-window wide fronts. They have semicircular arched doorways to right; panelled doors with sidelights and fanlights; one a stuccoed Doric porch. Their windows are recessed sashes, in stuccoed reveals, under flat gauged arches. Reaching out below the first floor is a stucco plat band, painted stone or stucco cornice over the next, then a stucco cornice and blocking course marking the attic storey. Original, cast iron, geometric patterned balconies adorn the first floor. Cast iron area railings with urn finials enclose the front. №3 has a blue plaque as the home of Captain Marryat and George Grossmith.

== In film, fiction and the media ==
In 1814 and 1815, the square was the chosen setting for cheaper newspapers and inner page articles to perpetuate a fresh round of the urban myth of a pig-faced woman.

The cover photograph for Please Please Me, the first LP by the Beatles, was taken by Angus McBean in 1963. It showed the group looking down over the stairwell inside EMI House (now demolished) in the square, EMI's then London headquarters. A repeat photo was taken in 1969 for the cover of their then-intended Get Back album; it was not used when the project saw release as Let It Be, but was eventually used on the retrospective albums 1962–1966 and 1967–1970.

“Bowie 1965!”, a 2013 vinyl re-release of a four track EP of songs by David Bowie’s early bands the Manish Boys and Davy Jones (and the Lower Third), features an early photo of Bowie standing next to a Manchester Square sign. The designation Metropolitan Borough of St Marylebone, which became defunct in 1965, is still visible on the sign.

In the early 20th century, the chemical company ICI moved into a new headquarters in the north-west corner of the square, which was designed in a modern style with classical elements. Around the rest of the square stand tall brick Georgian terraced houses, many of which are inside converted to offices.

Manchester Square Fire Station, just over a full block north-west, in retail/leisure street Chiltern Street, was decommissioned in June 2005 by the London Fire and Emergency Planning Authority (LFEPA) and, expanding further south, forms a luxury hotel and restaurant.
