= Church of St Thomas à Becket, Pylle =

Church in Somerset, England

Church of St Thomas à Becket
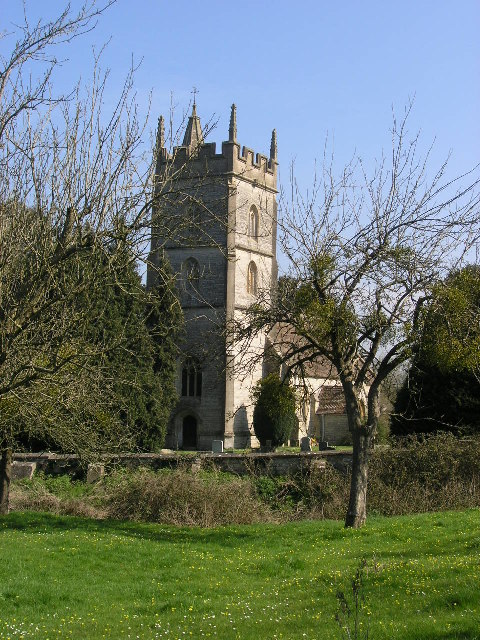

- Location within Somerset
- 51.1429°N 2.5631°W
- Location: Pylle, Somerset, England

History
- Built: 15th century

Listed Building – Grade II*
- Official name: Church of St Thomas a Beckett
- Designated: 2 June 1961
- Reference no.: 1175680

The Anglican Church of St Thomas à Becket in Pylle, Somerset, England, was built in the 15th century. It is a Grade II* listed building.

== History ==
The tower of the church remains from a 15th-century building, however most of the rest of the church was rebuilt in 1868. The building work was for the Portman family of Orchard Portman.

The parish is part of the Fosse Trinity benefice within the Diocese of Bath and Wells.

== Architecture ==
The stone building has a tiled roof. It consists of a four-bay nave and two-bay chancel with a porch to the south and vestry on the north side. The three-stage tower is supported by diagonal buttresses and has an embattled parapet.

The font inside the church dates from the 11th century. Inside the church is a brass plaque commemorating the men of the village who died in the First and Second World Wars.

== See also ==
- List of ecclesiastical parishes in the Diocese of Bath and Wells
