= Incubator (gallery) =

Gallery in London

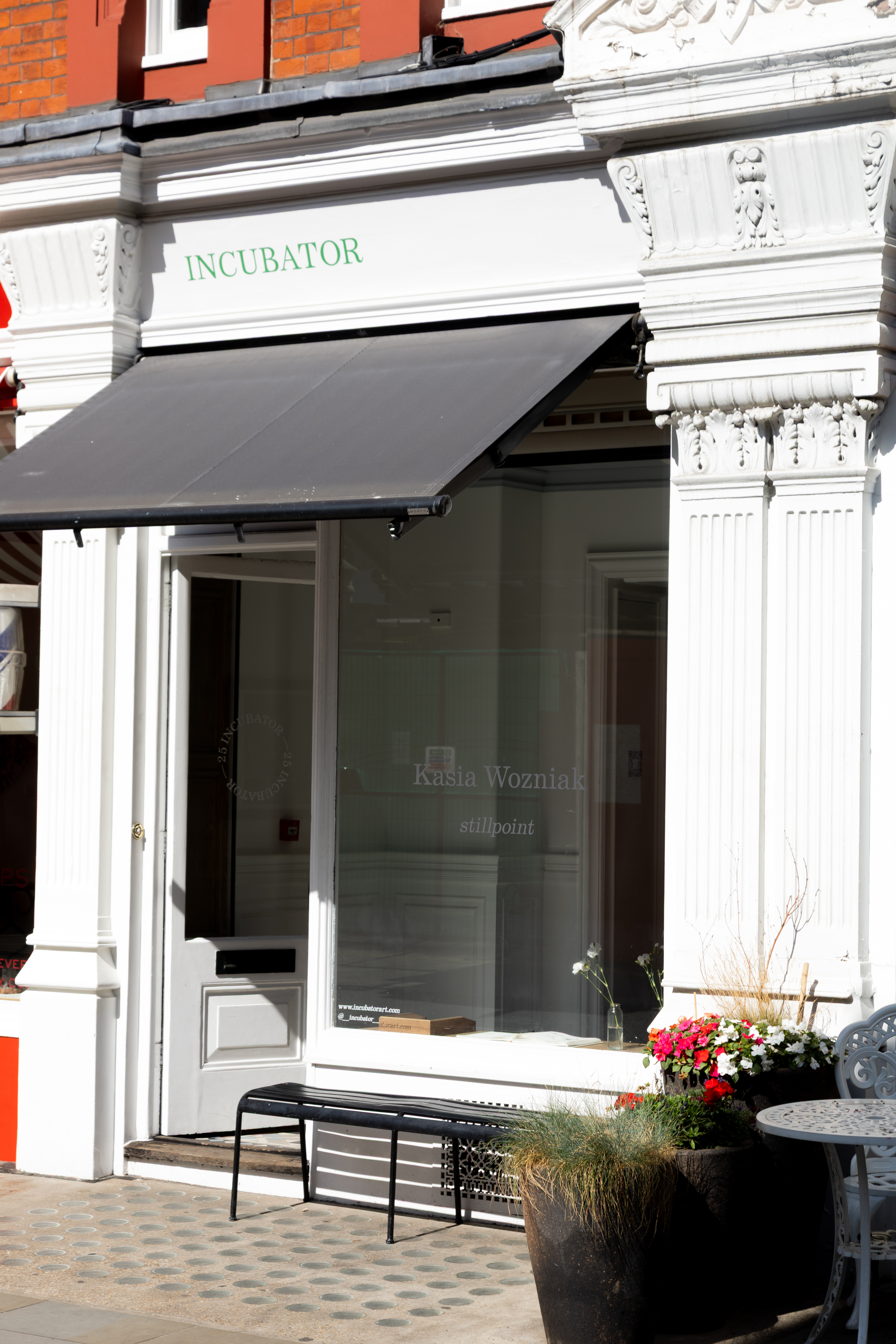
- Front of Incubator in 2025

General information
- Address: 2 Chiltern Street
- Town or city: London W1U 7PR
- Country: United Kingdom
- Coordinates: 51.52092740089248°N 0.1544223184272379°W
- Opened: April 2023

Incubator is a fine arts gallery on Chiltern Street in London of the United Kingdom. It has shown exhibitions by artists like Kazia Wozniak, Nina Ogden, Leonard Iheagwam, Elena Angelini, and others, and also has an emphasis on spotlighting emerging artists in the city. Originally run as a string of pop-up exhibitions in London, it found a permanent location in 2023.

== History ==
Incubator was founded by Angelica Jopling in 2021 with a "youthful, collaborative energy" in mind as a gallery. Jopling had originally tried to open a gallery during her undergraduate years at Stanford University, but her grant proposal was unsuccessful. During the COVID-19 pandemic, she returned to London and sought to create the community-based artistic space that would then become Incubator.

Jopling ran pop-up exhibitions from 2020–2022 in Soho before finding a permanent location on Chiltern Street in 2023. Since then, every spring and fall, Incubator hosts solo shows for six artists, with two weeks for each. Every summer and winter, the gallery opens group exhibitions for both emerging and established artists.
