= Emma Portman, Baroness Portman =

British aristocrat

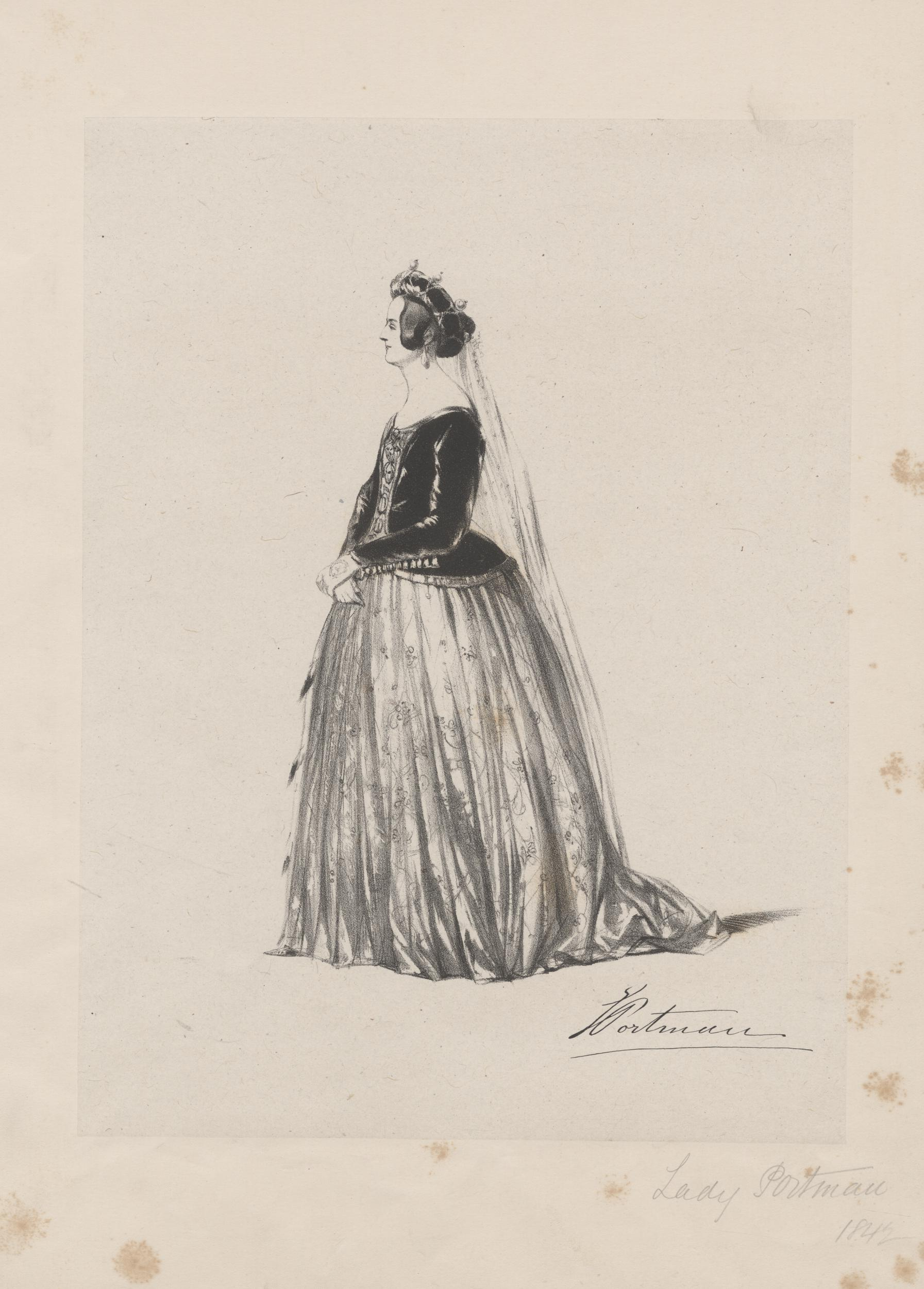
Lady Portman, c.1842

Emma Portman, Baroness Portman VA (née Lascelles; 16 March 1809 – 8 February 1865) was a British aristocrat. She was the daughter of Henry Lascelles, 2nd Earl of Harewood and Henrietta Sebright.

She married Edward Portman, son of Edward Berkeley Portman and Lucy Whitby, on 16 June 1827. He became a viscount in 1873, eight years after she had died.

They had six children, four sons and two daughters. The boys were William Henry Berkeley, who succeeded to the peerage; Edwin Berkeley, barrister-at-law and MP; Maurice Berkeley, a member of the Canadian parliament; Walter Berkeley, rector of Corton Denham, Somerset, near Orchard Portman.

She served as Lady of the Bedchamber to Queen Victoria between 1837 and 1851, then an Extra Lady of the Bedchamber between 1851 and 1865.

== Cultural depiction ==
Actress Anna Wilson-Jones portrayed Lady Emma Portman in the first three seasons of ITV period drama Victoria, with Robin McCallum as Lord Portman.
