= Henry Portman =

Henry William Portman (1738 – 11 January 1796) was an 18th-century housing developer, the ancestor of the Viscounts Portman.

== Biography ==
Portman's Name Act 1735
- Act of Parliament
- Parliament of Great Britain
- Long title: An Act to enable William Berkeley Esquire, now called William Portman, and his Issue Male, to take and use the Surname of Portman only.
- Citation: 9 Geo. 2. c. 22 Pr.
- Territorial extent: Great Britain

Dates
- Royal assent: 5 May 1736
- Commencement: 15 January 1736 (Note: Start of session.)

Status: Current legislation

He was the son and heir of Henry William Berkeley Portman MP (died 1761), by his wife Anne Fitch. His grandfather was William Berkeley (died 1737) of Pylle, Somerset, who had changed his surname, by a private act of Parliament, Portman's Name Act 1735 (9 Geo. 2. c. 22 Pr.), to Portman on becoming heir to his distant cousin Sir William Portman, 6th Baronet (died 1690) of Orchard Portman, Somerset—as well as quartering the Portman arms with his own.

He succeeded his father in the estates of Bryanston and Orchard Portman in 1761, and to the Berkeley estates at Pylle on the death of his aunt Lady Burland. He developed 200 acres (0.81 km^{2}) of meadow in London (between Oxford Street and the present site of Regent's Canal) he had inherited from his Tudor ancestor Sir William Portman, turning it into the Portman Estate. He began issuing its first building leases in 1755, and building began in 1764 with Portman Square, which was to owe its popularity to buildings by Robert Adam and James ‘Athenian’ Stuart.

== Marriage and issue ==
On 20 January 1766, he married Anne Wyndham, daughter of Sir William Wyndham, of Dinton House, Wiltshire, by whom he had two sons and three daughters.

- Anne Mary Portman (26 October 1766 – 22 September 1844) unm.
- Henry Berkeley Portman (1767 – 22 March 1803), m. 2 May 1793, Hon. Lucy Elizabeth Dormer, daughter of Charles, 8th Lord Dormer. Three weeks after the wedding his father signed a new will, in which Henry was disinherited and the Portman properties left to his younger son (possibly because Lord Dormer was a Roman Catholic). Henry was elected M.P. for Wells in 1790, but withdrew from parliament after the disagreement with his father. He and Lucy had one daughter, Charlotte Fanny (1797 – 27 March 1877), who was born at Barrells Hall, in Warwickshire, the home of Robert Knight (who was married to Lucy's sister). Still resident at Barrells Hall, on 28 August 1820, Charlotte Portman married John Poulett, 5th Earl Poulett & had issue.
- Henrietta Portman (1769 – 15 April 1846), m. 11 July 1800 Lewis Tregonwell (1758–1832), of Cranborne, Hants. & Bournemouth, and had issue.
- Edward Berkeley Portman (31 January 1771 – 19 January 1823), ancestor of the present Viscounts Portman
- Wyndham Portman (7 April 1775 – 21 November 1843) unm.
