= Sir William Portman, 6th Baronet =

English politician

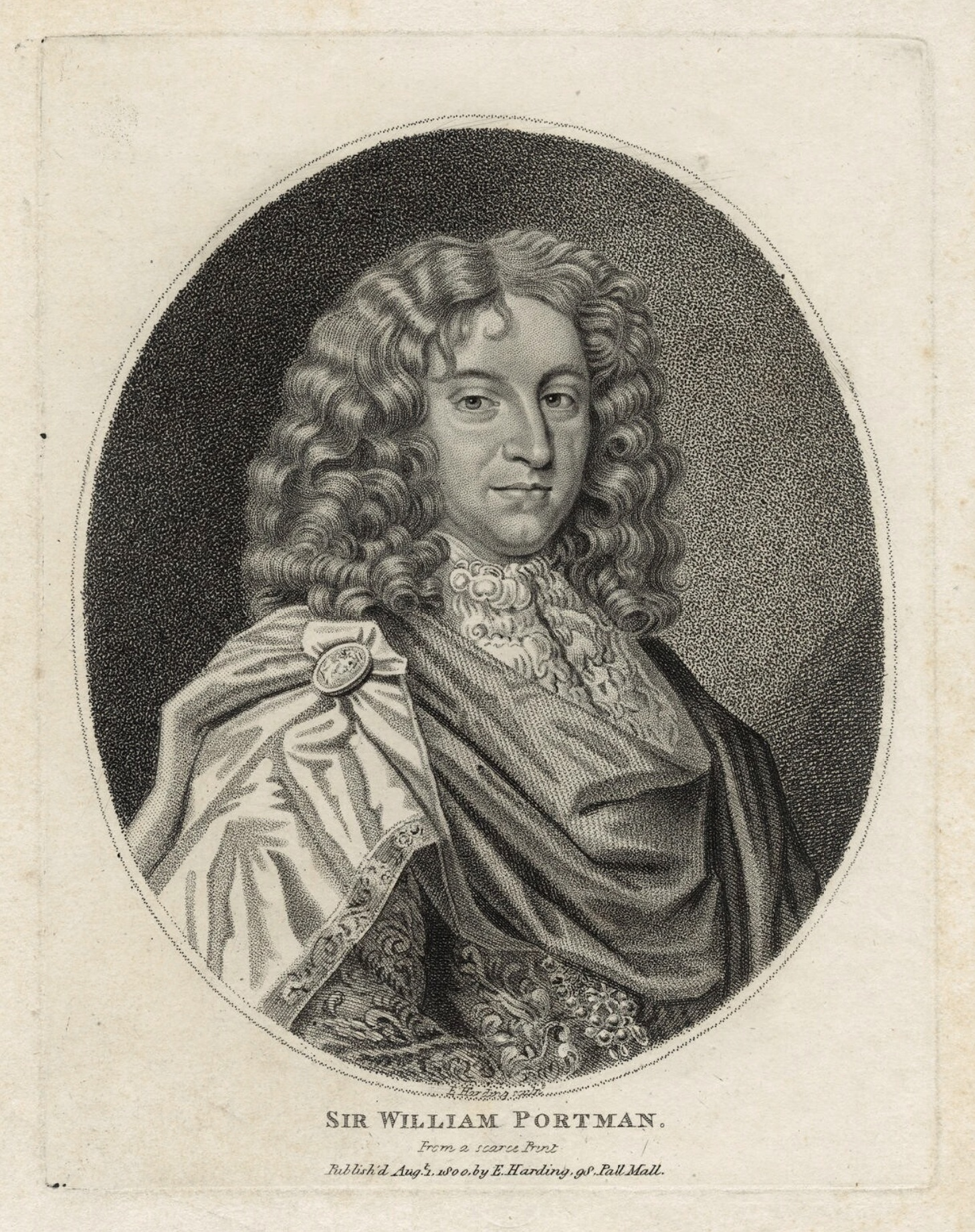
1800 portrait of Portman

Sir William Portman, 6th Baronet, FRS (5 September 1643 – 18 March 1690) was an English politician who represented Taunton and Somerset in the House of Commons of England from 1661 to 1690. Portman was the son of Sir William Portman, 5th Baronet and his wife Anne Colles, daughter of John Colles. He inherited the baronetcy on the death of his father in 1646.

In 1661, Portman was elected Member of Parliament for Taunton for the Cavalier Parliament and held the seat until 1679. In 1679 he was elected MP for Somerset where he sat until 1685. He was then elected MP for Taunton again, and held the seat until his death in 1690. Portman married three times but died without issue and the baronetcy became extinct.

== Life ==
He was the eldest son of Sir William Portman, 5th Baronet (1610–1648) of Orchard Portman, by Anna, daughter and coheiress of John Colles of Barton. The father was returned for Taunton to both the Short and Long parliaments of 1640, but was disabled, as a royalist, to sit on 5 February 1644. On his death in 1648, William succeeded him as sixth baronet.

He matriculated at All Souls' College, Oxford, 26 April 1659, and at the Restoration of 1660 was made a Knight of the Bath. He represented Taunton in parliament from 1661 until 1679, and from 1685 till his death. From 1679 to 1681 he sat for the county of Somerset. Apart from Sir Edward Seymour, he was accounted as influential a tory as any in the west of England.

He was a strong ‘abhorrer’ during the exclusion crisis in Charles II's reign, and while attending parliament in May 1685 he received a mysterious warning of the Duke of Monmouth's impending insurrection in the west. He directed the search of post-coaches in the neighbourhood of Taunton, in the hope of intercepting treasonable correspondence, and took an active part in investigating the causes of disaffection, and later on in organising the militia. After the battle of Sedgmoor (6 July 1685) Portman, with the Somerset militia, formed a chain of posts from Poole to the northern extremity of Dorset, with a view to preventing Monmouth's escape. On 8 July he and Lord Lumley captured the fugitive Duke near Ringwood in the New Forest, and did not trust him out of their sight until he was delivered safe at Whitehall.

In November 1688 Portman joined the Prince of Orange at Exeter with a large following. William is said to have intended him for high promotion, but he died at his seat of Orchard Portman, near Taunton, on 20 March 1690. Sir William was elected a Fellow of the Royal Society on 28 December 1664.

== Family and heirs ==
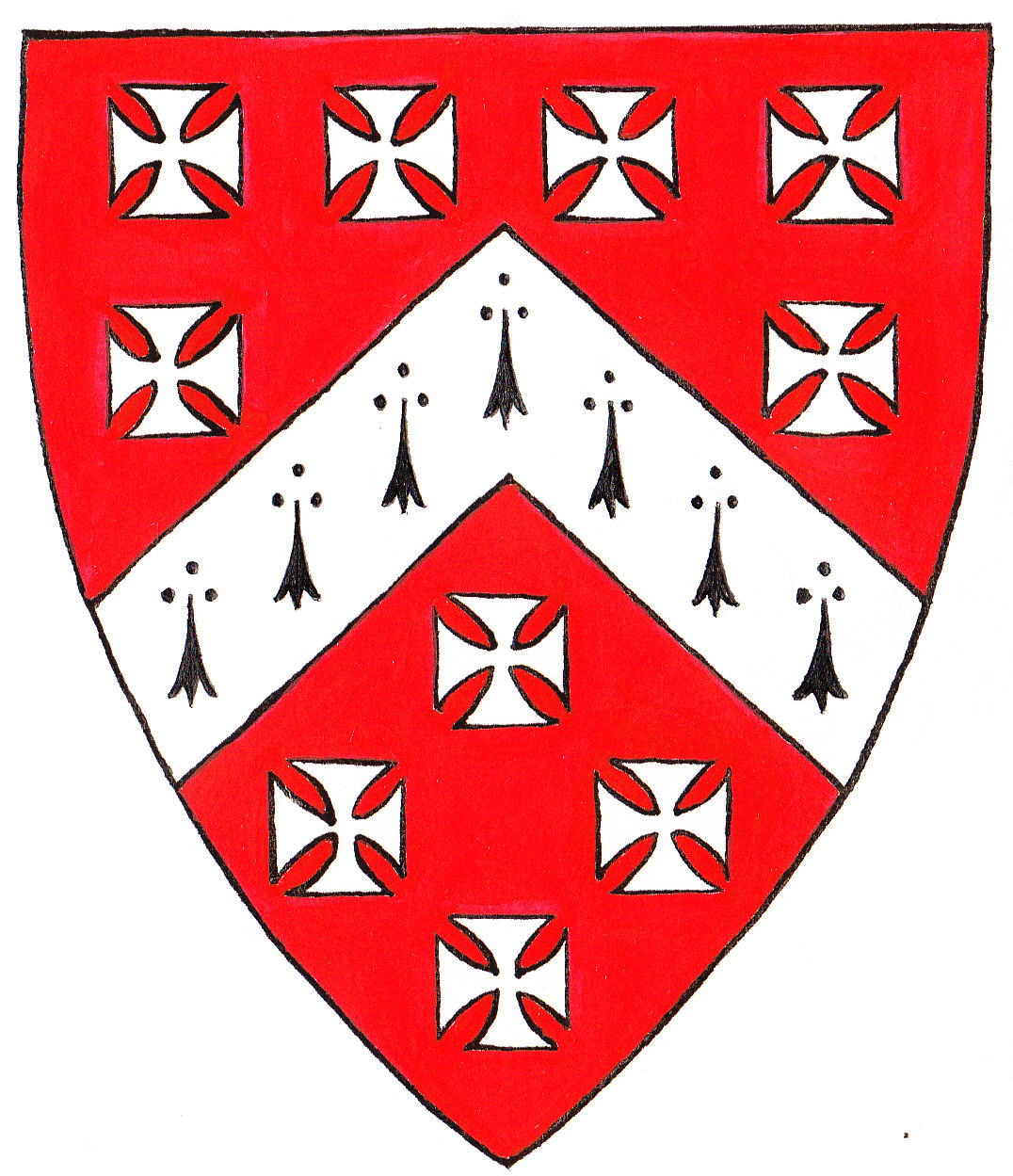
Arms of Berkeley of Stoke Gifford: Gules, a chevron ermine between ten crosses pattee argent. These arms may be seen in The Gaunts Chapel, Bristol and are the arms of the Barons Berkeley with the difference of a chevron ermine in place of a chevron argent.

He married three times, but had no issue. He married firstly in 1661, Elizabeth, daughter and coheiress of Sir John Cutler, 1st Baronet by his first wife; secondly in 1674, Elizabeth, the daughter and coheiress of Thomas Southcote of Buckland Tout Saints, Devon and thirdly in 1682, Mary, the daughter and heiress of Sir John Holman, 1st Baronet of Banbury, Oxfordshire.

He left his valuable estate to his first cousin Henry Seymour (d. 1728), the 5th son of his aunt Anne Portman (d. 1695) and her husband Sir Edward Seymour, 3rd Baronet (d. 1688). Henry Seymour assumed the name and arms of Portman, and although twice married, left no male progeny. Under Sir William's will his next heir was another cousin, William Berkeley (d. 1737) of Pylle, Somerset, great-grandson of his other aunt, Joan Portman, sister of Anne Portman (d. 1695). Joan had married Sir George Speke of Whitelackington, Somerset, and their daughter Philippa Speke became the wife of Edward Berkeley (d. 1669) of Pylle, 4th in descent in a junior line from Richard Berkeley (d. 1514) of Stoke Gifford, Gloucestershire, which manor had been granted in 1337 by Maurice de Berkeley, 2nd Baron Berkeley (1271-1326) to his second son Maurice de Berkeley (d. 1347). Philippa's son was Edward Berkeley (d. 1707) MP, of Pylle, who married Elizabeth Ryves, daughter of John Ryves of Ranston, Dorset. Their second son was William Berkeley (d. 1737) of Pylle (who was heir to his elder brother Maurice Berkeley (d. 1717) MP of Pylle) who became in 1728 the second heir of Sir William Portman, 6th Baronet, who like his first heir Henry Seymour, changed his surname to Portman by a private act of Parliament, Portman's Name Act 1735 (9 Geo. 2. c. 22 Pr.). He also assumed the arms of Portman which he quartered with his paternal arms of Berkeley of Stoke Gifford, placing the Portman arms in the 1st and 4th quarters of greatest honour. His grandson Henry William Portman gave his name to Portman Square in London (begun in 1764), and was grandfather of Edward Berkeley Portman, 1st Viscount Portman (1799-1888). Bryanston Square is named after Bryanston, the seat and estate purchased by Sir William in Dorset shortly before his death.

== Sources ==
- History of Parliament, House of Commons, Members 1660-1690, published by History of Parliament Trust
- This article incorporates text from a publication now in the public domain: Lee, Sidney, ed. (1896). "Portman, William (1641?-1690)". Dictionary of National Biography. Vol. 46. London: Smith, Elder & Co.

Parliament of England
Preceded by Thomas Gorges; Sir William Wyndham, 1st Baronet	Member of Parliament for Taunton; 1661–1679; With: Sir William Wyndham, 1st Baronet; John Trenchard	Succeeded by Sir John Cutler, Bt; John Trenchard
Preceded by Sir John Sydenham, 2nd Baronet; Sir Hugh Smith	Member of Parliament for Somerset; 1679–1685; With: George Speke	Succeeded by Sir John Smith; George Horner
Preceded by Edmund Prideaux; John Trenchard	Member of Parliament for Taunton; 1685–1690; With: John Sanford; Edward Clarke	Succeeded by John Speke; Edward Clarke
Baronetage of England
Preceded by William Portman	Baronet (of Orchard); 1645–1690	Extinct
