= Edward Portman, 9th Viscount Portman =

British peer

Edward Henry Berkeley Portman, 9th Viscount Portman (22 April 1934 – 2 May 1999), was a British peer.

== Biography ==
Portman was the elder son of the Hon Michael Berkeley Portman and the grandson of Gerald Berkeley Portman, 7th Viscount Portman. His father's elder brother was Gerald William Berkeley Portman, 8th Viscount Portman. Portman inherited the viscountcy on the death of his uncle in 1967.

Portman alleged that Arnold Goodman, Baron Goodman had stolen funds worth £10 million from his family's trust over a 30-year period and made donations to the Labour Party. Portman commenced legal proceedings for recovery but the claim was never substantiated and the research of Goodman's biographer concluded that it had no substance.

== Marriages and children ==
Portman married Rosemary Joy Farris, daughter of Charles Farris, on 26 September 1956. They had two children:

- Christopher Edward Berkeley Portman, 10th Viscount Portman (b. 30 July 1958) married Caroline Steenson on 30 July 1983 and they were divorced in 1987. They have one son. He remarried Patricia Pims on 7 December 1987. They have two sons.
- The Hon Claire Elizabeth Portman (b. 1 October 1959) married Anthony Henry Robinson on 8 January 1983. They have three sons.

They were divorced in 1965 and Portman was subsequently married to Penelope Anne Allin on 31 March 1966. They had four sons:

- The Hon Alexander Michael Berkeley Portman (born 19 August 1967) married Emma Morgan in 1992. They have two sons.
- The Hon Justin Trevor Berkeley Portman (b. 23 February 1969) married Natalia Vodianova in November 2001 and they were divorced in 2010. They have three children. He remarried Morgan Snyder in June 2019. They have two children.
- The Hon Piers Richard Berkeley Portman (b. 30 May 1971) married Alexandra Thompson on 17 June 1995 and they were divorced in 2001. They have one daughter. He remarried Tracy Brower in 2004. They have two sons.
- The Hon Matthew Gerald Berkeley Portman (born 12 August 1973, died in a motorcycle accident, 9 September 1990)

== Death ==
Portman died on 5 May 1999 at age 65 and was succeeded in the viscountcy by his eldest son, Christopher.

Peerage of the United Kingdom
Preceded by Gerald William Berkeley Portman	Viscount Portman; 1967–1999	Succeeded by Christopher Edward Berkeley Portman
