= George Browne (died 1631) =

English lawyer, landowner and politician

George Browne (1583–1631) was an English lawyer, landowner and politician who sat in the House of Commons at various times between 1614 and 1629.

Browne was the son of John Browne of Frampton, Dorset. He matriculated at Magdalen College, Oxford, on 13 October 1598, aged 15 and was awarded B.A. from University College, Oxford, on 12 May 1602. He was called to the bar at Middle Temple in 1609. In 1614, he was elected Member of Parliament for Lyme Regis in the Addled Parliament. He was of Symondsbury, Dorset, and Taunton Castle, Somerset. In 1626 he was elected MP for Taunton. He was Lent reader at Middle Temple in 1628. He was re-elected MP for Taunton in 1628 and sat until 1629 when King Charles decided to rule without parliament for eleven years.

Parliament of England
Preceded by Sir Francis Russell; George Jeffries	Member of Parliament for Lyme Regis; 1614; With: Sir Edward Seymour, 2nd Baronet	Succeeded by John Poulett; Robert Hassard
Preceded by Sir Hugh Portman; Thomas Brereton	Member of Parliament for Taunton; 1626–1629; With: Sir Robert Gorges 1626; Sir Hugh Portman, 4th Baronet 1628–1629	Parliament suspended until 1640
