= Church of St Thomas, Thurlbear =

Church in Somerset, England

Church of St Thomas
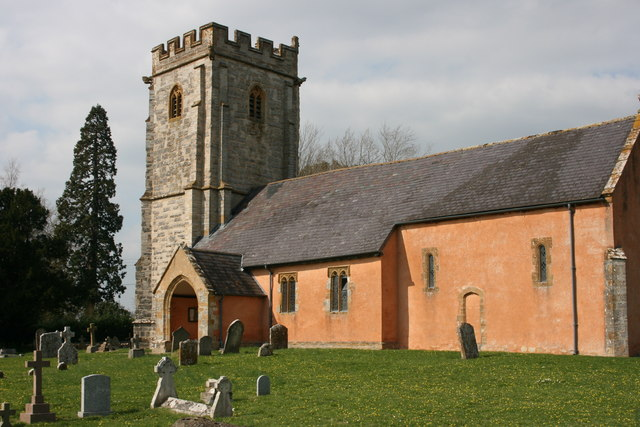

- Location within Somerset

General information
- Location: Thurlbear, Orchard Portman, England
- Coordinates: 50.9893°N 3.0788°W
- Completed: 12th century

The Church of St Thomas in the village of Thurlbear, which is in the parish of Orchard Portman, Somerset, England, dates from the 12th century. It has been designated by English Heritage as a Grade I listed building. It is a redundant church in the care of the Churches Conservation Trust. The church was vested in the Trust on 1 November 1988.

The church shows clear signs of the Norman church upon which later structures were built. Pevsner cites the Norman arcades and narrow aisles characteristic of that era and "never enlarged to satisfy later medieval taste." He dates the church to "hardly later than c. 1110."

The Churches Conservation Trust launched a programme of repairs at the church, with the Somerset County Council conducting an archaeological recording and survey in conjunction with these efforts.

== See also ==
- List of Grade I listed buildings in Taunton Deane
- List of towers in Somerset
- List of churches preserved by the Churches Conservation Trust in South West England
