= Sir William Wyndham, 1st Baronet =

English politician (1632–1683)

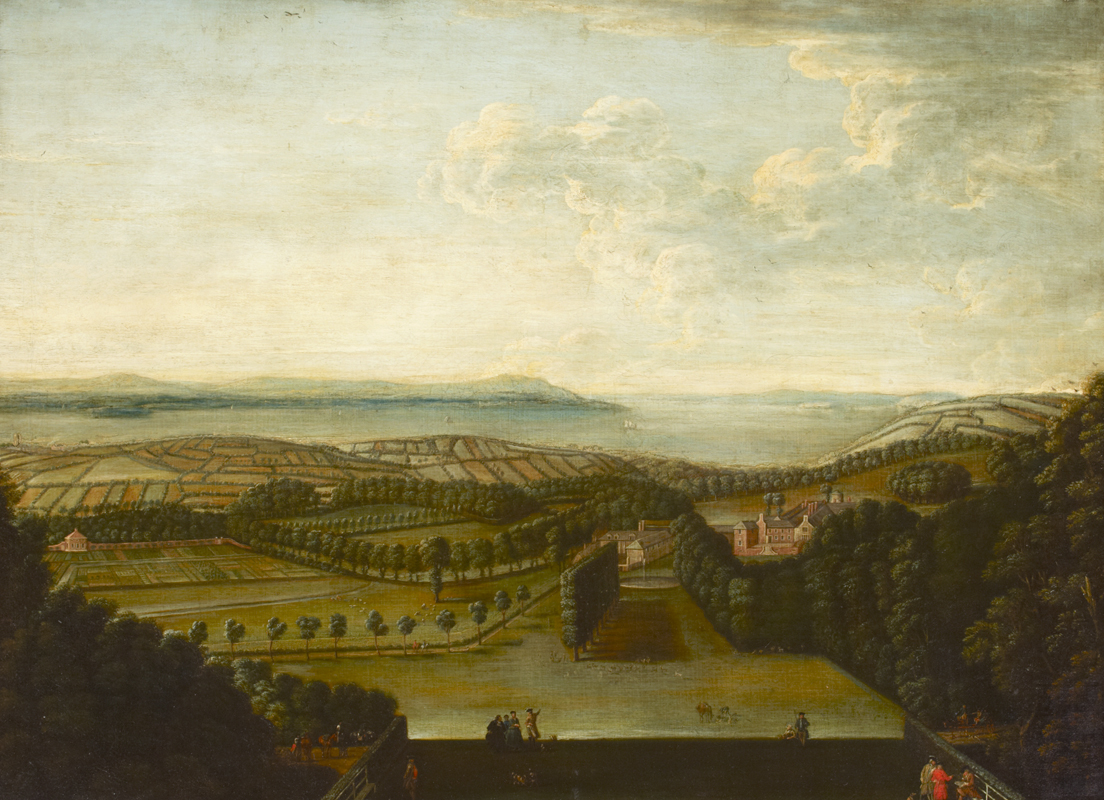
Orchard Wyndham: Sir William Wyndham Bt's birthplace

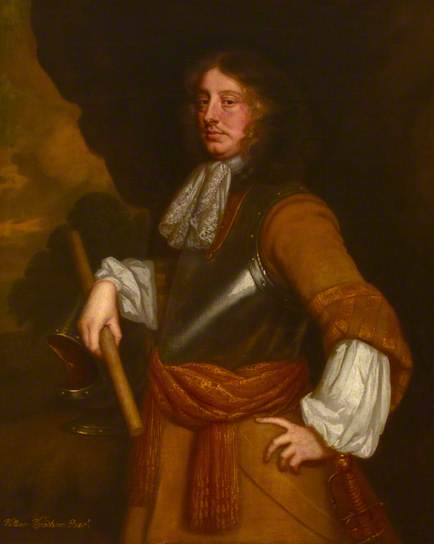
Sir William Wyndham, 1st Baronet (1633–1683), portrait late 1670s, studio of Sir Peter Lely (1618–1680). Collection of National Trust, Petworth House, Sussex.

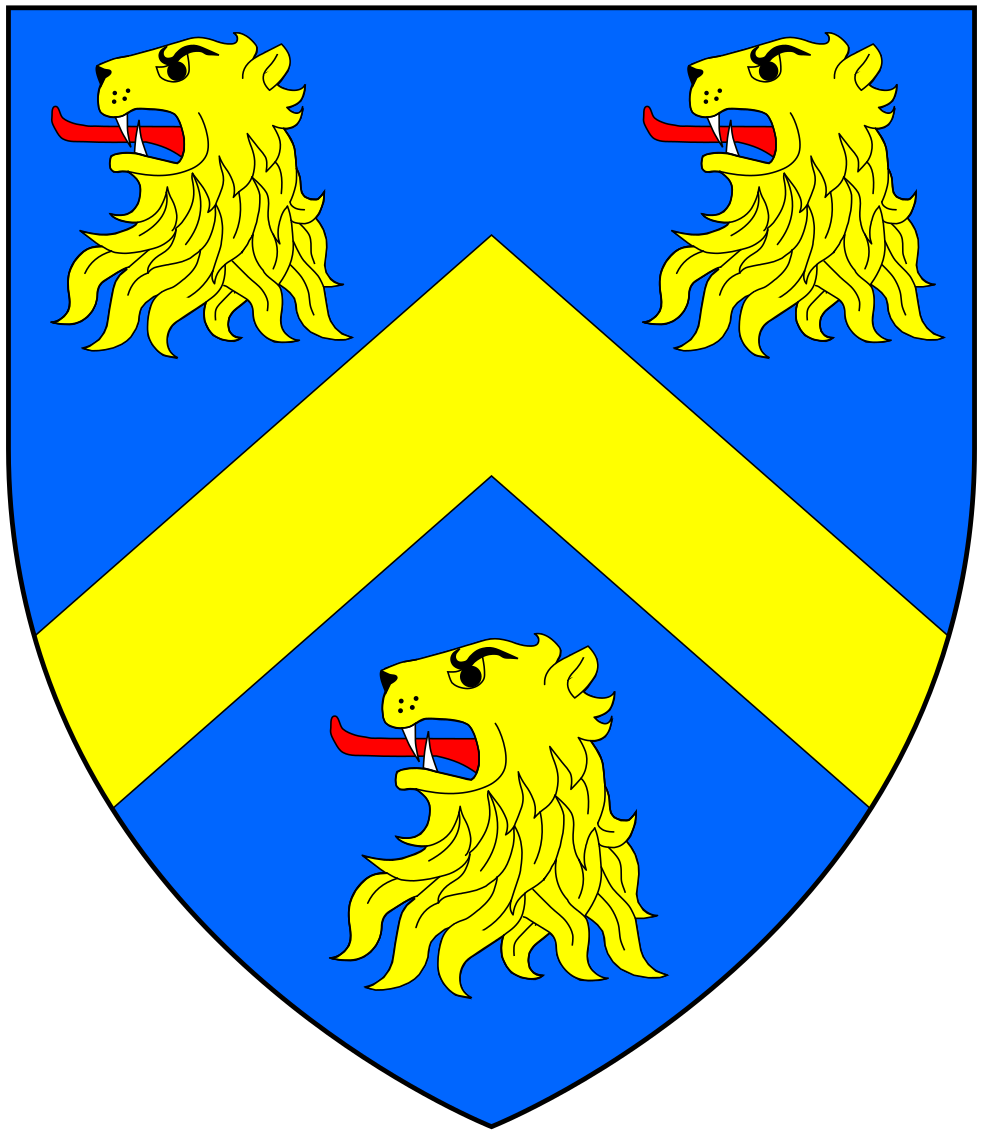
Arms of Wyndham: Azure, a chevron between three lion's heads erased or

Sir William Wyndham, 1st Baronet (ca. 1632 – 29 October 1683) of Orchard Wyndham, Somerset, was Member of Parliament for Somerset in 1656 and twice for Taunton in 1659 and 1660. He was Sheriff of Somerset in 1679–80.

== Origins ==
William Wyndham was the eldest son of John Wyndham (d. 1649) and grandson of Sir John Wyndham of Orchard Wyndham (a descendant of Lady Margaret Howard, a younger daughter of the 1st Duke of Norfolk), by his wife Catherine Hopton, daughter of Robert Hopton of Witham, Somerset.

== Career ==
He succeeded his father in 1649 when a student of Lincoln's Inn and travelled abroad from 1650 to 1653. In 1656 Wyndham was elected Member of Parliament for Somerset in the Second Protectorate Parliament. He was elected MP for Taunton 1659 in the Third Protectorate Parliament. In 1660 he was elected MP for Taunton again in the Convention Parliament. He was knighted by 24 August 1660. In 1661 he was re-elected MP for Taunton for the Cavalier Parliament. He was created by King Charles II a baronet, "of Orchard, Somerset", on 9 December 1661, and served as Sheriff of Somerset in 1679–80.

== Marriage and children ==
Wyndham married Frances Hungerford, daughter of Anthony Hungerford of Farleigh Castle, Somerset on 8 June 1653 and had five sons and six daughters including:

- Sir Edward Wyndham, 2nd Baronet (c.1667-1695), of Orchard Wyndham, eldest son and heir.
- Joan Wyndham (1669–1687), first wife of William Cary (c.1661-1710) of Clovelly, Devon.

Parliament of England
Preceded by Thomas Gorges; Robert Blake	Member of Parliament for Taunton; 1659; With: Thomas Gorges	Succeeded by John Palmer; One seat vacant
Preceded by John Palmer; One seat vacant	Member of Parliament for Taunton; 1660–1679; With: Thomas Gorges 1660–1661; Sir William Portman 1661–1679	Succeeded by Sir William Portman; John Trenchard
Baronetage of England
New creation	Baronet (of Orchard, Somerset); 1661–1683	Succeeded by Edward Wyndham
