= Edward Portman =

British housing developer (1771–1823)

Edward Berkeley Portman (31 January 1771 – 19 January 1823, Rome) of Bryanston House, Bryanston, Dorset was an 18th-century English housing developer and politician.

He was the son of Henry Portman, and ultimately a descendant of the Tudor landowner Sir William Portman. Edward continued his father's work developing the family lands in London into the Portman Estate. He was appointed High Sheriff of Dorset for 1798–99.

He also sat as Member of Parliament for Boroughbridge between 1802 and 1806 and for Dorset between 1806 and 1823.

== Marriage and issue ==
On 21 August 1798, he married Lucy Whitby (10 Mar 1778 - 25 Mar 1812), daughter of Reverend Thomas Whitby. Among their children were:

- Marianne Portman, married George Drummond (son of George Harley Drummond and Margaret Munro) in 1831, died 1 December 1842
- Edward Berkley Portman, 1st Viscount Portman (1799–1888)
- Harriet Ella Portman, married William Stratford Dugdale (MP) (son of Dugdale Stratford Dugdale and Hon. Charlotte Curzon, daughter of Assheton Curzon, 1st Viscount Curzon) in 1827, died 17 April 1903 (1807-1903)
- Reverend Henry Fitzharding Berkeley Portman (1811–1893)

After Lucy's death in 1812, he married as his second wife Mary Hulse, daughter of Sir Edward Hulse, 3rd Baronet Hulse, on 22 March 1816. The couple had no children.

== Bibliography ==
- John Burke, A Genealogical and Heraldic History of the Commoners of Great Britain and Ireland, London 1834, vol. I, p. 62-64

Parliament of the United Kingdom
Preceded by Sir Francis Burdett, Bt; Hon. John Scott	Member of Parliament for Boroughbridge; 1802–1806; With: Hon. John Scott 1802–1806; Viscount Castlereagh 1806	Succeeded by Henry Dawkins; William Henry Clinton
Preceded by Francis John Brown; William Morton Pitt	Member of Parliament for Dorset; 1806–1823; With: William Morton Pitt	Succeeded by William Morton Pitt; Edward Portman
