= Christopher Portman, 10th Viscount Portman =

British peer and property developer (born 1958)

The Right Honourable The Viscount Portman
- Born: Christopher Edward Berkeley Portman; 30 July 1958 (age 68)
- Occupation: Property developer
- Spouses: Caroline Steenson; Patricia Martins Pim
- Children: 3 sons

Christopher Edward Berkeley Portman, 10th Viscount Portman (born 30 July 1958) is a British peer and property developer.

== Early life ==
Portman is the eldest son of Edward Portman, 9th Viscount Portman, by his first wife Rosemary Joy Farris. He was educated at Marlborough College. He inherited the viscountcy upon his father's death in 1999.

== Career ==
This fortune is principally the controlling interest in a 110-acre (0.45 km^{2}) portion of Marylebone, central London, the Portman Estate. The trust is spending £40 million on an investment programme to create a shopping area, Portman Village.

Lord Portman's other assets include shares in commercial properties in New York state and Florida.

== Personal life ==
Portman is a resident of Switzerland. In May 2025, the Sunday Times Rich List estimated his net worth to be £1.9 billion.

=== Marriages and children ===
Portman's first wife was Caroline Steenson, and they had one son:

- The Hon. Luke Henry Oliver Berkeley Portman (born 1984), heir apparent to the viscountcy.

In 1987, he married the Brazilian Patricia Martins Pim, now Viscountess (Lady) Portman, and they have two sons:

- The Hon. Matthew Portman (born 1990)
- The Hon. Daniel Portman (born 1995)

== Arms ==
Coat of arms of Christopher Portman, 10th Viscount Portman
Coronet Coronet of a Viscount Crest 1st: a Talbot sejant Or; 2nd: a Unicorn passant Gules armed and crined Or Escutcheon Quarterly: 1st and 4th, Or a Fleurs-de-lis Azure (Portman); 2nd and 3rd, Gules a Chevron Ermine between ten Crosses Patée Argent six in chief and four in base (Berkeley of Stoke Gifford) Supporters Dexter: a Savage wreathed about the head and waist with Ivy in his dexter hand a Club resting on the shoulder proper; Sinister: a Talbot Or Motto A Clean Heart and a Cheerful Spirit

Peerage of the United Kingdom
Preceded by Edward Henry Berkeley Portman	Viscount Portman; 1999–present	Incumbent
