= Hugh Portman =

English politician

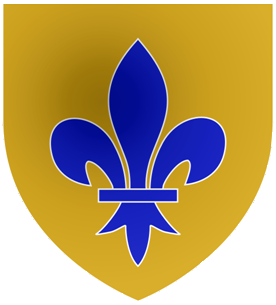
Arms of Portman:Or, a fleur-de-lis azure

Sir Hugh Portman, 4th Baronet (died 1632) was an English politician who sat in the House of Commons in two parliaments between 1625 and 1629.

Portman was the son of Sir John Portman, 1st Baronet and his wife Anne Gifford, daughter of Sir Henry Gifford. The baronetcy went successively to Sir John Portman's four sons, passing to Hugh on the death of Sir John Portman, 3rd Baronet unmarried in 1624.

In 1625, Portman was elected Member of Parliament for Taunton for the Useless Parliament. He was re-elected for Taunton in 1628 where he sat until 1629 when King Charles decided to rule without parliament.

Portman died in 1632 and was succeeded by his brother William.

Parliament of England
Preceded by Robert Prowse; Thomas Brereton	Member of Parliament for Taunton; 1625; With: Thomas Brereton	Succeeded by Sir Robert Gorges; George Browne
Preceded by Sir Robert Gorges; George Browne	Member of Parliament for Taunton; 1628–1629; With: George Browne	Parliament suspended until 1640
Baronetage of England
Preceded by John Portman	Baronet (of Orchard); 1624–1632	Succeeded by William Portman
