= Sir Edward Wyndham, 2nd Baronet =

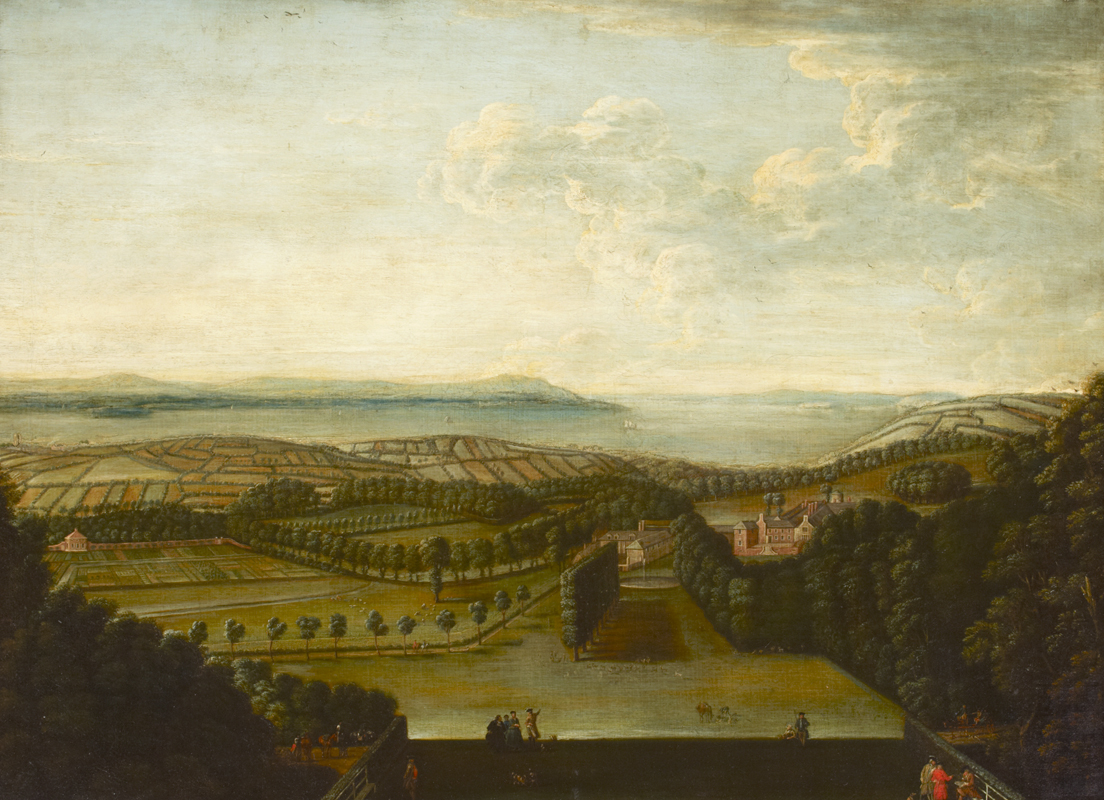
Orchard Wyndham: Sir Edward Wyndham Bt's birthplace

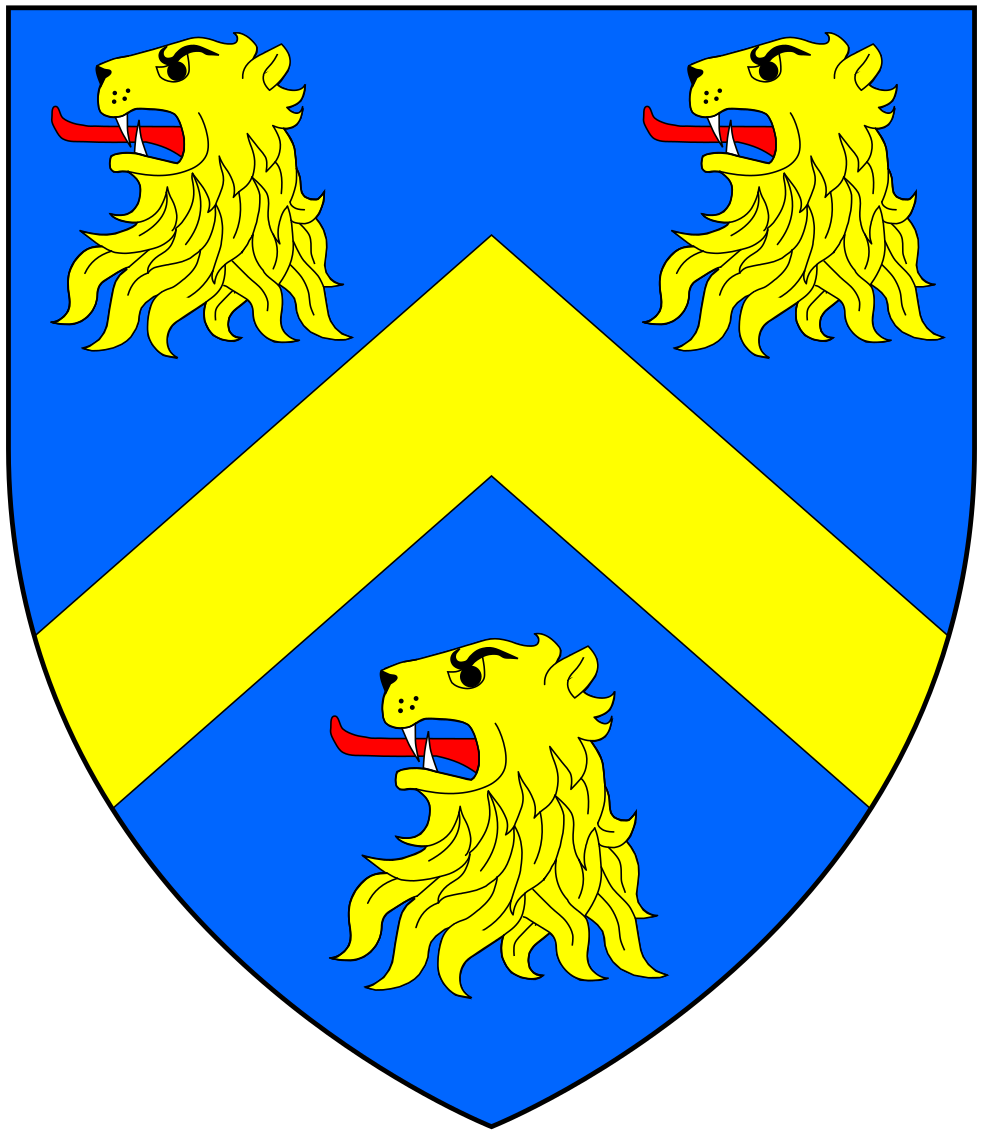
Arms of Wyndham: Azure, a chevron between three lion's heads erased or

Sir Edward Wyndham, 2nd Baronet (c. 1667 – 29 June 1695), of Orchard Wyndham, Somerset, was three times member of parliament for Ilchester, Somerset, from 1685 to 1687, from 1689 to 1690, and from 1690 to 1695.

He was the fourth and only surviving son of Sir William Wyndham, 1st Baronet (c. 1632 – 1683) of Orchard Wyndham, MP and Sheriff of Somerset in 1679–80, by his wife Frances Hungerford, daughter of Anthony Hungerford of Farleigh Castle, Somerset.

Wyndham married to Katherine Leveson-Gower, daughter of Sir William Leveson-Gower, 4th Baronet. His heir was his son, Sir William Wyndham, 3rd Baronet (c. 1688 – 1740), of Orchard Wyndham.

Baronetage of England
Preceded by William Wyndham	Baronet (of Orchard, Somerset); 1683–1695	Succeeded by William Wyndham
