= Maurice Vidal Portman =

British naval officer and photographer (1860–1935)

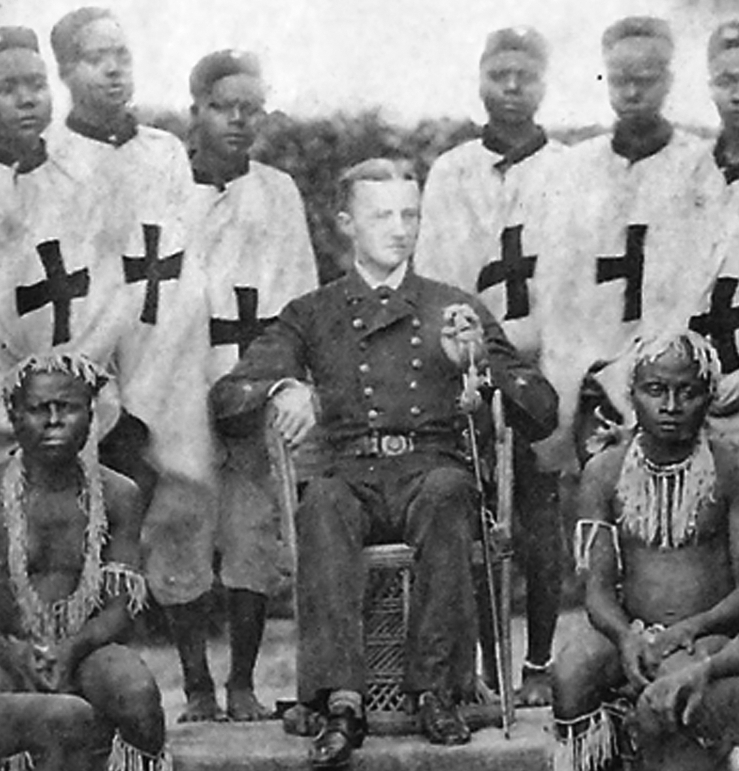
- Portman with Andamanese chiefs c. 1880
- Born: 21 March 1860; England
- Died: 14 February 1935 (aged 74); Axbridge, Somerset
- Known for: Documenting Andamanese tribes
- Parents: Maurice Berkeley Portman (father); Helen Vidal Harris (mother)
- Relatives: Edward Portman (grandfather); Emma Portman (grandmother)

Maurice Vidal Portman (21 March 1860 – 14 February 1935) was a British naval officer, who is best known for documenting some of the Andamanese tribes between 1879 and 1901 when he was posted as a superintendent of the Andaman Island Penal Colony.

== Life and career ==
Portman was born in England, the third son of Maurice Berkeley Portman and Helen Vidal Harris. His father was in turn the third son of Edward Portman, 1st Viscount Portman, and Emma Portman, Baroness Portman. He joined the Royal Indian Marine at the age of 16 and was some time in charge of the Viceroy's yacht. In July 1879 he was stationed at Port Blair in the Andaman Islands and made Officer in Charge of the Andamanese, a post which he held for more than 20 years with few interruptions (including December 1880 to December 1883 on sick leave, March 1887 to March 1888 on furlough).

== Port Blair ==
During his time as a colonial administrator at Port Blair, Portman took a large number of photographs of the Andamanese, including some at the request of the British Museum (at his own expense) and the Government of India (on payment). Portman also undertook an expedition to North Sentinel Island to contact the previously uncontacted tribe inhabiting the island. During the expedition, the Sentinelese fled at the sight of the expedition, though his party kidnapped two adults and four children, taking them to the capital of the South Andaman Island, Port Blair. The adults died of illness soon after reaching Port Blair, and Portman ordered the children to be sent back with a large number of gifts after a few weeks. The illness carried by the returning children, who had acquired them in Port Blair, has been suggested by some as the cause of the hostility displayed by the Sentinelese towards outsiders. During his time as a colonial administrator, Portman noted the devastating impact outside diseases, such as smallpox, had on the Andamanese.

Portman continued to take photographs of the Andamanese in Port Blair until the end of his stay in the island, documenting information about their anthropological details, showing a marked interest in measuring the penises of the Andamanese. Portman often traveled without other British personnel, preferring instead to be accompanied by Andamanese servants with whom he engaged in sexual relations. Portman repeatedly praised the male Andamanese body, writing that "many of the men are very good-looking; as they have none of the thick lips, high cheekbones, and flat noses of the negro type; though the women are rather of the Hottentot Venus order of beauty". The plates made by Portman are now scattered among several museums around the world and may be partly unpublished. He also wrote two books, Notes of the Languages of the South Andaman Group of Languages (1898) and A History of Our Relations with the Andamanese (1899). Portman also composed a significant collection of ethnographic objects during his time on the Andaman Islands that are now in the collections of the British Museum.

== Later life ==
His obituary stated that he had a "frail physique" and suffered from ill health. Later, his obituary explains that he considered himself a homosexual. After retiring as an invalid in 1901, he went back to Britain where he did some journalism and "some valuable Secret Service work" during World War I. He was a member of the Union Club.

Portman died in 1935 in Axbridge, Somerset. He never married and left no descendants.
