= William Portman (priest) =

William Portman was an Irish Anglican clergyman.

Portman was a Prebendary of Achonry and Archdeacon of Elphin from 1661 until 1665.
