= Maurice Berkeley Portman =

Canadian Politician

The Hon. Maurice Berkeley Portman (January 18, 1833 – January 12, 1888) was a political figure in Canada West. He represented East Middlesex in the Legislative Assembly of the Province of Canada from 1861 to 1863.

He was the son of Viscount Portman and Lady Emma Lascelles and was educated at Durham University in England. In 1846, he married Helen V. Harris. Portman married Evelyn Harriet Lavinia Portman in 1867 after the death of his first wife.

His son Maurice Vidal became a colonial administrator in the Andaman Islands, also researching the native people and languages of those islands.
