= Chiltern Street =

Street in London, England

Coordinates: 51.52020°N 0.15546°W

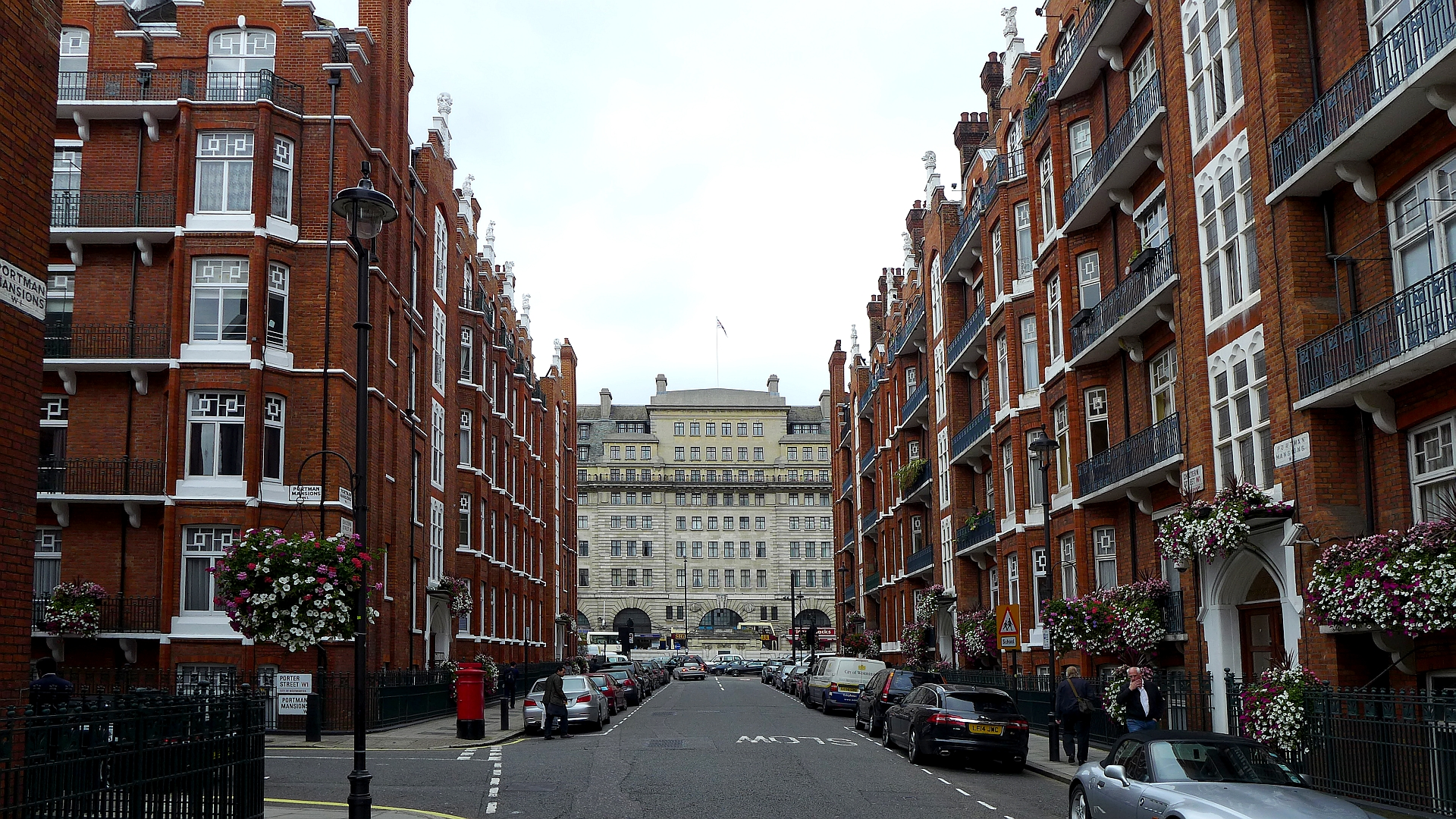
Looking north past Portman Mansions to Chiltern Court and Baker Street station beyond.

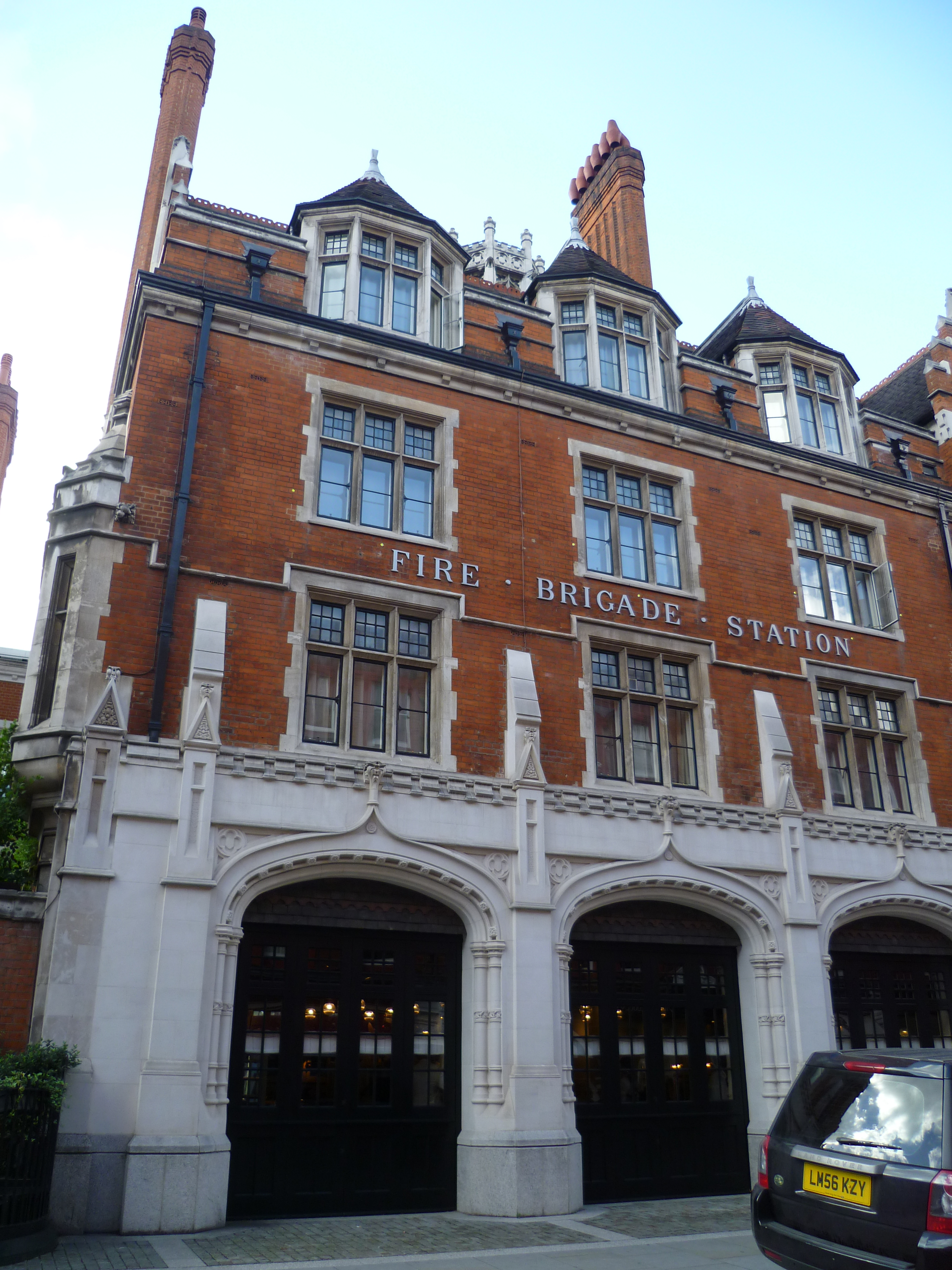
The former Chiltern Firehouse.

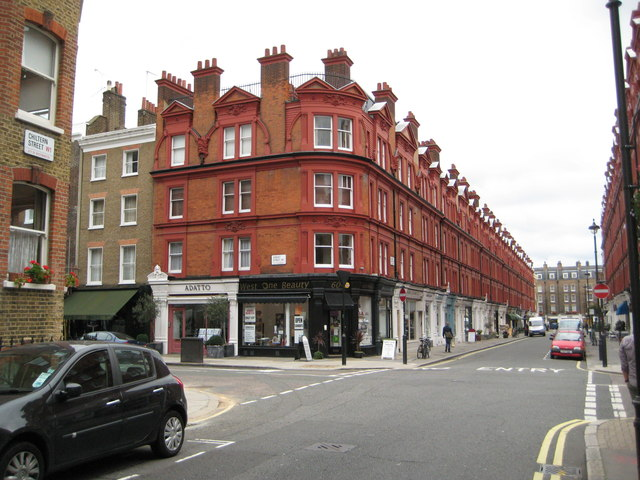
Looking south at the junction with Dorset Street.

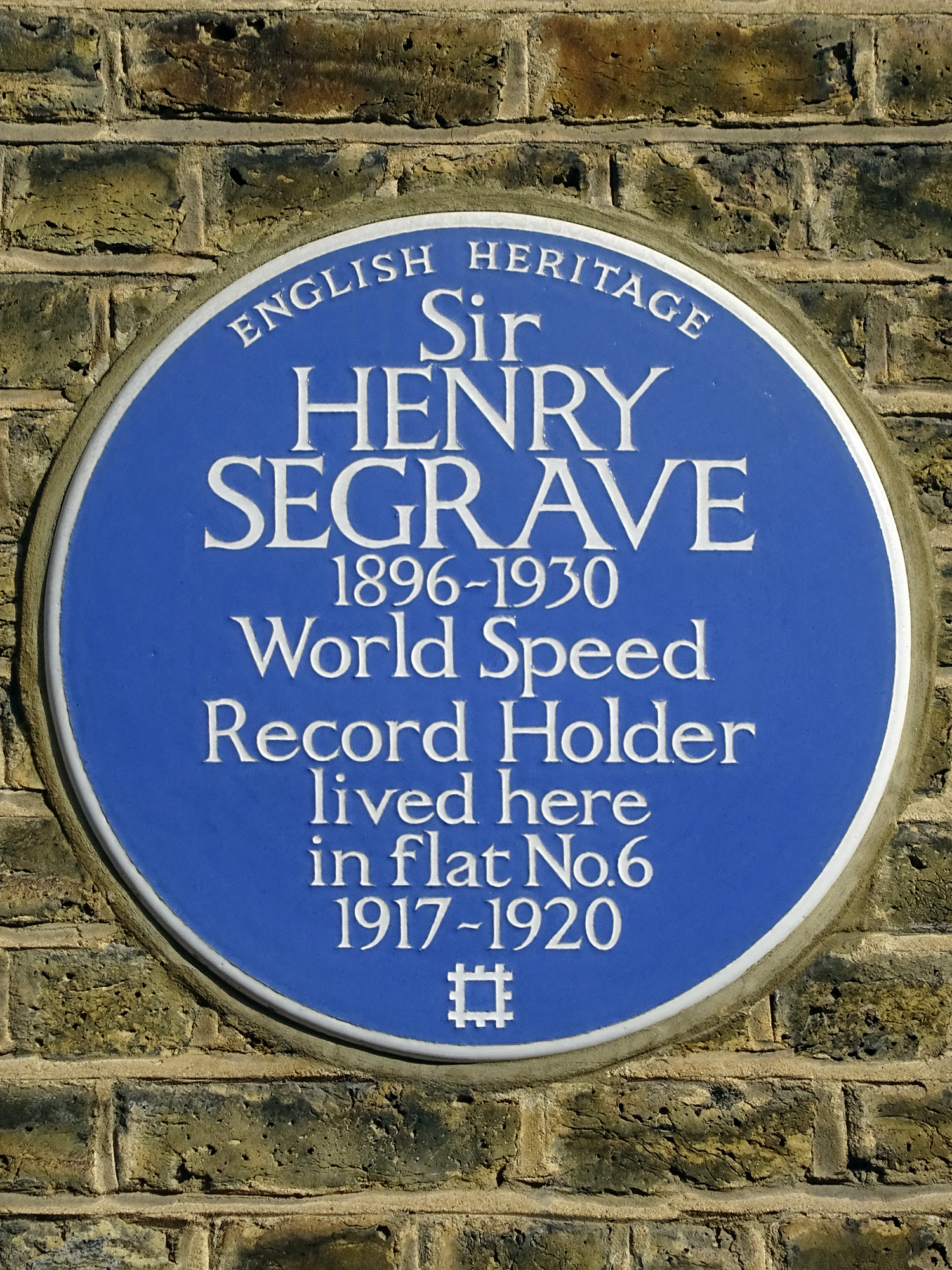
Blue plaque commemorating the world speed record holder Henry Segrave.

Chiltern Street is a road in the Marylebone area of Central London. Located in the City of Westminster, it runs north to south connecting Marylebone Road and Blandford Street. Baker Street runs parallel a little way to the west. It meets Dorset Street, Crawford Street and Paddington Street along its route. Manchester Square is located beyond the southern end of the street.

It is part of the Portman Estate and dates back to the eighteenth century. Historically it was known as East Street, with the name changing in 1937. Until the second half of the nineteenth century it didn't run as far north as the Marylebone Road, with the short David Street and buildings blocking the route. It is one of several streets and buildings in the area with names linked to the Chiltern Hills, which were connected to Marylebone from both the Metropolitan Line and the Great Central Railway from Marylebone Station. The street shares its name with the Chiltern Court building over Baker Street tube station which was planned in 1912 but not fully constructed until the 1920s after wartime delays. An entrance to the station is located on the junction between Chiltern Street and Marylebone Road.

The street features a mixture of commercial and residential buildings. At the southern end is the 1899 Grade II listed Chiltern Firehouse, formerly the Marylebone Fire Station and now converted into a restaurant. In 1864 a Welsh Methodist Chapel was opened in the street. A particular feature is the large redbrick Portman Mansions constructed in the 1890s at the northern end of the street. Notable residents of the street have included Henry Segrave the world land speed record holder in the 1920s, who is now commemorated with a blue plaque.

== Bibliography ==
- Bebbington, Gillian. London Street Names. Batsford, 1972.
- Cherry, Bridget & Pevsner, Nikolaus. London 3: North West. Yale University Press, 2002.
- Mackenzie, Gordon. Marylebone: Great City North of Oxford Street. Macmillan, 1972.

Media related to Chiltern Street at Wikimedia Commons
