= Chiltern Firehouse =

Hotel and restaurant in London

Coordinates: 51°31′07″N 0°09′18″W

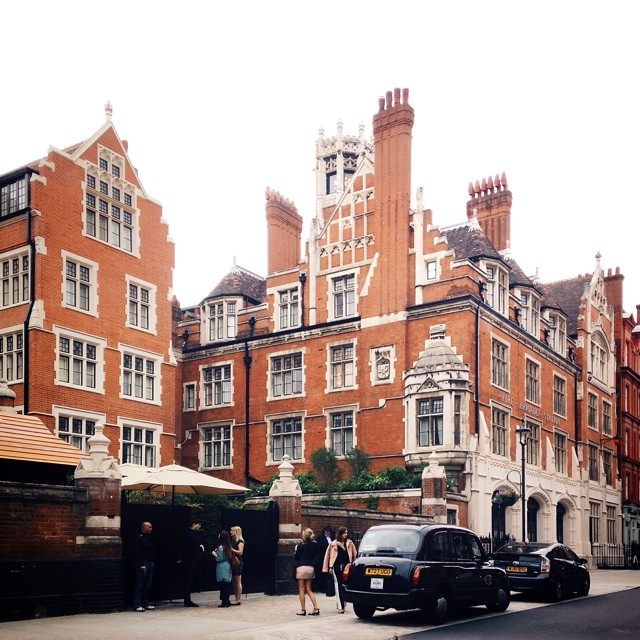
- Exterior view in 2014
- Interactive map of Chiltern Firehouse

Restaurant information
- Established: 2013
- Owner: André Balazs
- Head chef: Luke Hunns
- Food type: American cuisine
- Location: 1 Chiltern Street, Marylebone, London, England
- Other information

Listed Building – Grade II
- Official name: Fire Station
- Designated: 11 October 1984
- Reference no.: 1291524
- Website: chilternfirehouse.com

The Chiltern Firehouse is a temporarily closed restaurant and boutique hotel located at 1 Chiltern Street in the Marylebone area of London, England. It occupies the Grade II listed building of the former Marylebone Fire Station, originally known as the Manchester Square Fire Station. It is owned by André Balazs, an American hotelier, who also owns the Chateau Marmont in Los Angeles, California. The head chef is Luke Hunns. It is currently closed for repairs following a fire which broke out in 2025.

== Manchester Square Fire Station ==
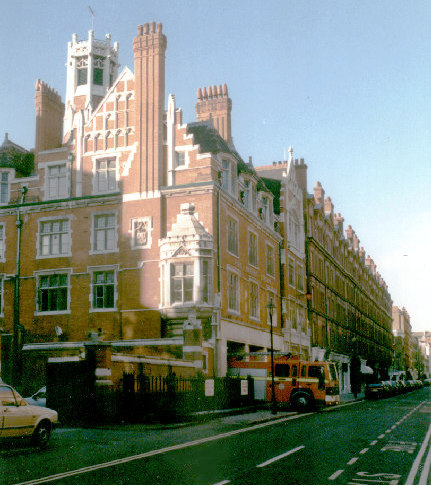
Marylebone Fire Station in 1996

The building was constructed in 1889 as the Manchester Square Fire Station, since Manchester Square is nearby. It was designed by the London County Council Architect's Department "in the Vulliamy manner". "Red brick with stone dressings; tiled roof. Free Tudor-Gothic style". It was built as a fire station, and it was one of the first fire stations in London. The original architect was Robert Pearsall.

Later known as the Marylebone Fire Station, it was decommissioned in June 2005 by the London Fire and Emergency Planning Authority. For some years afterward, it was in occasional use as an exhibition space for local artists, since there was a long and complex planning process to convert it to a luxury hotel and restaurant. David Archer of Archer Humphryes Architects acted as lead architect for the project.

== Chiltern Firehouse hotel and restaurant ==
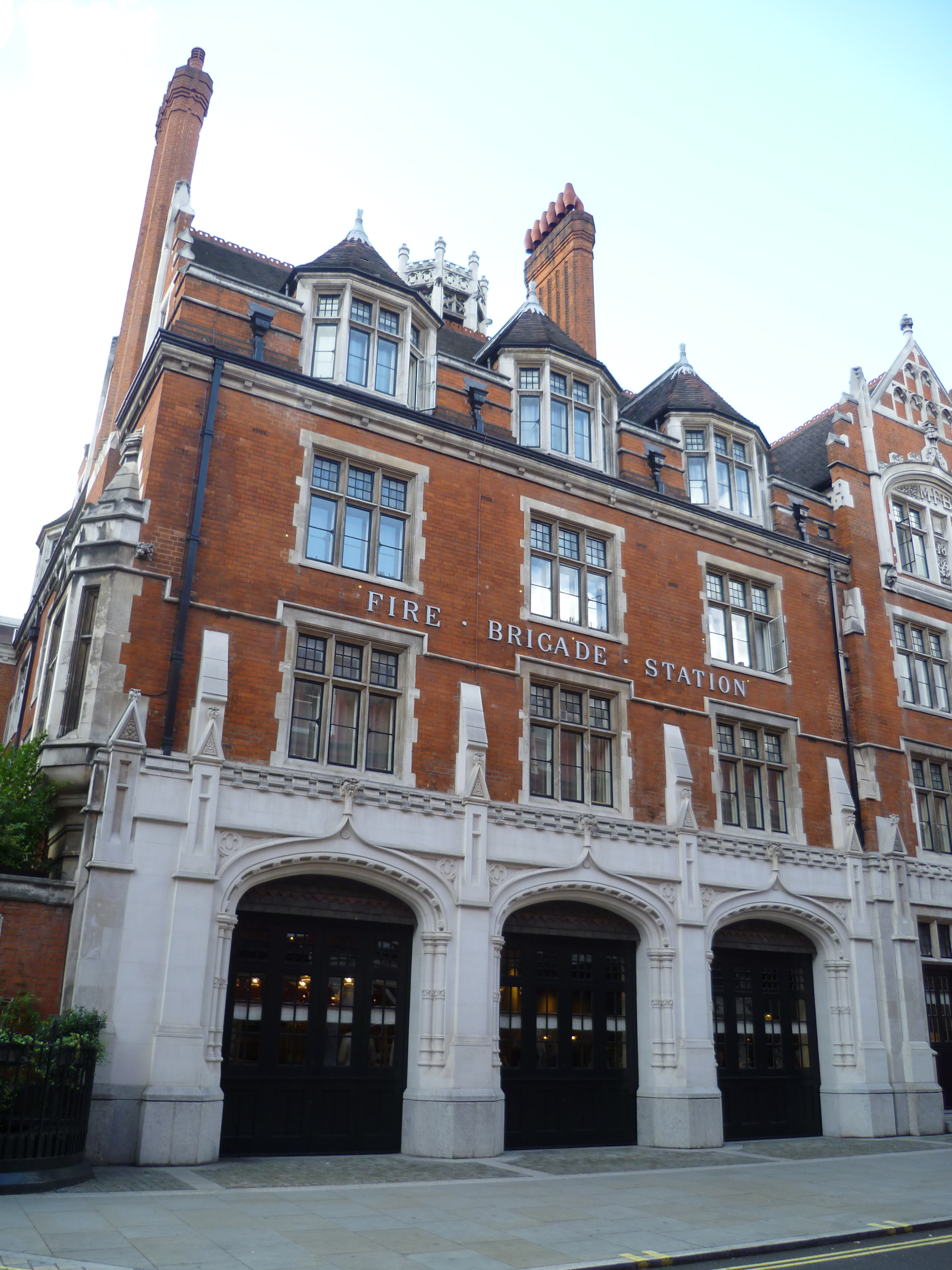
Exterior of the Chiltern Firehouse

In 2013, the Chiltern Firehouse opened as a 26-suite hotel and 200-seat restaurant. It was the first British establishment by American hotelier André Balazs.

=== Interior ===
The restaurant features an open kitchen, and the interior was designed by Paris-based Studio KO. The Independent's restaurant critic Tracey MacLeod described the interior by saying that "they've kept the huge firehouse doors, giving an almost rustic feel, while cleverly-placed mirrors create the illusion of infinite space." Londonist reported:

The look of the space is unique. A ceiling clad with fabric that would feel at home on the seats of the Bakerloo line, carpeted corridors your gran would like, and a scattering of pot plants and nic-nacs lend a feel that's simultaneously homely and nothing at all like a home you could imagine.

Grace Dent of the London Evening Standard described a "glorious dining room that is part classic French brasserie, part industrial—supporting pillars, a fireman's pole and low-hanging lights—and part chintzy in-joke with pot plants, ornaments, thick hallway carpets and marble tables."

=== Food hygiene failings ===
The Times reported in August 2014 that officers from Westminster City Council's food safety team had awarded the restaurant only two stars out of a possible five when the restaurant was inspected. Inspectors had found dirty surfaces, food served below safe temperatures, dirty fly screens, poor access to hot water and soap, and broken glass in a freezer. A former chef who spoke to The Times said: "Upstairs the diners could see the chefs working away in the open-plan kitchen, but downstairs it was a different story ... We had people using an ironing board to chop herbs on and there was no extraction". The article was accompanied by a photograph of a chef using an ironing board to prepare food. The Chiltern Firehouse commented that the "vast majority" of the problems had been rectified.

=== Celebrity patronage and criticism ===
In June 2014, The Daily Telegraph called it "London's hottest celebrity hangout", saying: "Once upon a time, celebrities liked to nibble their lettuce leaves at The Ivy. Then, the place to go for your sushi (and a quick romp in the broom cupboard) was Nobu. These days, it's the Chiltern Firehouse".

The Daily Mirror noted the Firehouse's exclusive reputation, asking: "Fancy booking a table at Chiltern Firehouse? Well unless your name is written on the Hollywood Walk of Fame then you may as well give up!" The Daily Telegraph reported a "rigorous screening process to accept bookings", saying: "Chiltern Firehouse is all about who's who and with the amount of detail gone into creating what has to be one of the loveliest and coolest new places in London, it's almost justified." MacLeod appeared critical of the exclusivity of the Firehouse, writing:

The garage, once home to the fire engines, now revs with the self-congratulatory hum of a fashionable crowd, who have scored a table despite a bookings policy apparently borrowed from the North Korean tourist board. [...] Appropriate perhaps, that in keeping with its previous incarnation, the Firehouse seems to operate a strict no-civilians policy.

Britta Jaschinski of Time Out said: "Checking in feels a bit like arriving at a Scientology meeting." Bryony Gordon blogged that "there is even a waiting list for the waiting list". The food, however, has not been universally praised, with Matthew Norman of The Daily Telegraph writing that the:

cooking ranges from the merely comforting to the plainly inedible; and which, despite the unstinting efforts of its publicists at Freud Communications to festoon newspaper pages with tidings of its stellar clientele, barely qualifies as the best restaurant on its own premises.

In 2024, Nimrod Kamer made a film about Chiltern Firehouse and Chiltern Street as a whole .

=== 2025 Valentine's Day fire ===
On 14 February 2025, a fire broke out at Chiltern Firehouse. It occurred on Valentine's Day, which was set to be a busy day at the hotel and restaurant. Around 100 people evacuated from the building and 125 firefighters from the London Fire Brigade were deployed to tackle the blaze. The fire was caused by burning wood which fell from a pizza oven resulting in a fire starting in the void between the basement and ground floor. Firefighters were later tackling the blaze on the roof. Prior to the fire, the restaurant was set to host Netflix's BAFTA after party on 16 February following the 78th British Academy Film Awards at Royal Festival Hall. Netflix moved their BAFTA party to Twenty Two following the fire.

The fire was caused by a pizza oven and was accidental. Burning wood fell from the pizza oven and ignited a void between the basement and ground floor.

==== Restoration ====
On 22 February 2025, architect Harriet Pillman said that restoring the Victorian building would be a complex undertaking for many reasons and that it could take up to three years to reconstruct and repair the building.

On 16 October 2026, fakemink and Skepta released a single titled Chiltern Firehouse in which the former referenced the Valentine's Day fire.
