= Portman Estate =

British land trust

Coordinates: 51°31′4.2″N 0°9′36.73″W

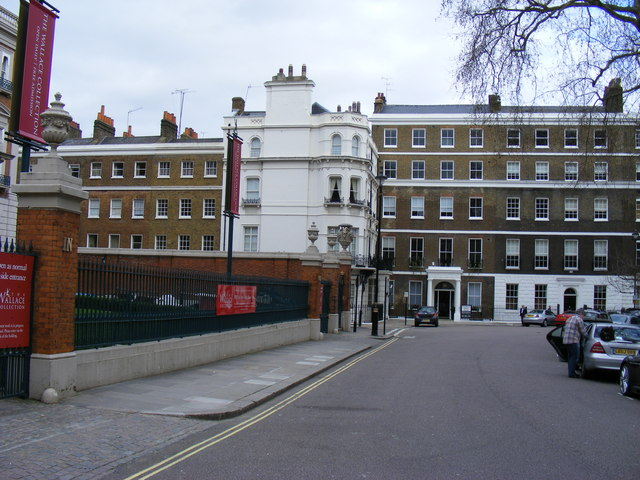
Manchester Square, part of the Portman Estate

The Portman Estate, covering 110 acres of Marylebone in London’s West End, was founded in 1532 when the land was first leased to Sir William Portman.

The Estate's owner, Christopher Portman, 10th Viscount Portman, also has a rural estate in Buckinghamshire and another in Herefordshire. In addition to its core landlord operation, The Portman Estate runs the Portman Foundation, a charitable trust which supports charities and other causes which are located in or benefit the Marylebone area.

== Area ==
The London Estate in Marylebone covers 110 acres from Edgware Road in the west to beyond Baker Street in the east, and north almost as far as Crawford Street. It covers 68 streets, 650 buildings and four garden squares.

The estate's Chiltern Street was voted “London’s Coolest Street” by Condé Nast Traveler in 2016. Characterised by a row of red brick frontages and a Grade II listed Victorian fire station, the street is now a boutique hotel by American hotelier Andre Balazs; The Chiltern Firehouse.

The Portman Estate owns and manages two farms with very different characteristics. Portman Burtley in Buckinghamshire covers 2,000 acres of farmland and woodland which have an organic beef enterprise of 200 South Devon cattle. Portman Wilmaston in Herefordshire is a 1,000 acre mixed farm of sheep, cattle, arable land and woodland.

== History ==
Map of Portman Square (1830)

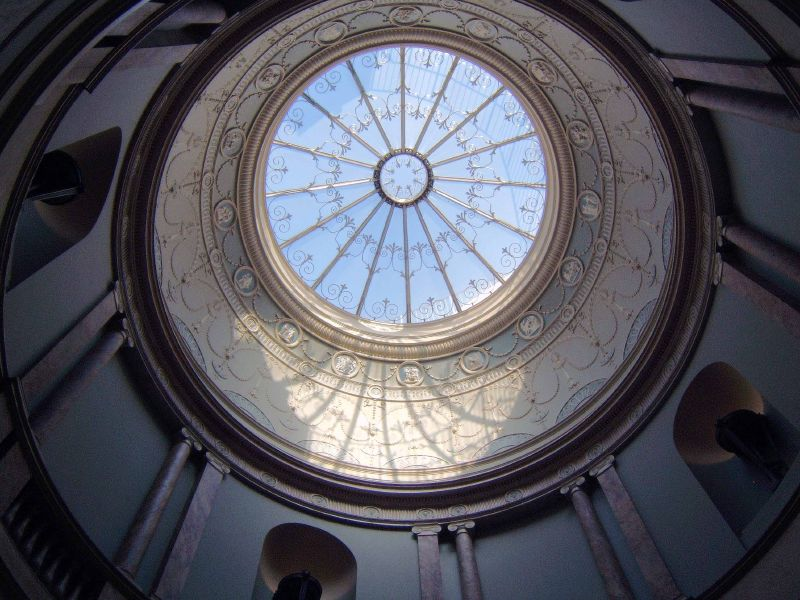
Adam's neoclassical Home House (1777)

The Portman Estate dates back to the 16th century, when Sir William Portman, Lord Chief Justice to King Henry VIII, and originally from Orchard Portman in Somerset, leased 270 acres of the Manor of Lileston (Lisson). He acquired the freehold in 1554, but most of the land remained farmland and meadow until the mid-18th century and the building boom after the end of the Seven Years' War in 1763.

In the 1750s William Baker had leased land from the family to lay out Orchard and Portman Streets, and the north side of Oxford Street. Henry Portman, a descendant of Sir William, continued the development in 1764 with the creation of Portman Square, with buildings by James Wyatt, Robert Adam and James 'Athenian' Stuart, including Montagu House, built in the north-west corner for the famed literary hostess Elizabeth Montagu and later used by the Portman family as their London town house.

Portman Square was the focus of the new estate and was followed by the building of Manchester Square during the 1770s and Bryanston and Montagu Squares 30 years later. These were laid out by the Estate's architect, James Thompson Parkinson. The area remained largely residential, attracting the prosperous middle class who wanted to live near the centre of the metropolis – then little more than Westminster and the City of London. There were also mews for tradesmen and servants. At the southwest corner of the Estate, where Marble Arch now stands, was the Tyburn gallows, the capital city's principal place of public execution until 1783.

Development of the area north of the Marylebone Road around Dorset Square continued after 1815, and to the North West in Lisson Green, workers’ cottages were built from 1820 to 1840. Many of the original Georgian houses north of Portman Square were redeveloped as mansion blocks, which were let on long leases. This development spread along the major traffic routes of Edgware Road and Baker Street.

In 1948 the Estate, then valued at £10 million, was subject to death duties of £7.6 million on the death of Gerald Portman, 7th Viscount Portman, resulting in the sale of all the family's West Country estates as well as the northern part of the London Estate in 1951, and the area around Crawford Street the following year. In the later 1950s and 1960s the Estate collaborated with the developer Max Rayne to redevelop the frontage of Oxford Street and Baker Street, as well as the south and west sides of Portman Square.

=== Construction timeline ===
- 1764 – Portman Square
- c.1770 – Manchester Square
- 1810 – Bryanston Square and Montagu Square

== Notable buildings ==
Building	Location	Architect	Date
Home House	20 Portman Sq.	Robert Adam	1773-77
Montagu House (destroyed 1941)	22 Portman Sq.	James Stuart	1777-1781
Churchill Hotel	30 Portman Sq.		
Church of the Annunciation	Bryanston St.	Walter Tapper	1912-13
Wallace Collection (Hertford House)	Manchester Square		1776-88
Selfridges	Oxford Street	Daniel Burnham	1909

== Management ==
The Estate is held in trust for the benefit of the wider family, with over 130 beneficiaries. The ancestral title is held by The Viscount Portman who leads the family's management of the Estate through the Estate Trustees and the management company, Portman Settled Estates Limited.
