= Sir William Portman, 5th Baronet =

English politician

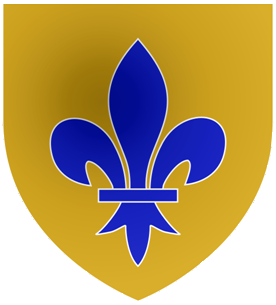
Arms of Portman:Or, a fleur-de-lis azure

Sir William Portman, 5th Baronet (died 1646) was an English politician who sat in the House of Commons from 1640 to 1644. He supported the Royalist side in the English Civil War.

Portman was the son of Sir John Portman, 1st Baronet and his wife Anne Gifford, daughter of Sir Henry Gifford. The baronetcy went successively to Sir John Portman's four sons, passing to William on the death of Sir Hugh Portman, 4th Baronet unmarried in 1632.

In April 1640, Portman was elected Member of Parliament for Taunton for the Short Parliament. He was re-elected for Taunton in November 1640 for the Long Parliament where he sat until February 1644 when he was disabled for supporting the Royalists

Portman married Anne Colles, daughter of John Colles of Barton, and left an only son William who succeeded to the baronetcy.

Parliament of England
Vacant Parliament suspended since 1629	Member of Parliament for Taunton; 1640–1644; With: Roger Hill; George Searle	Succeeded by John Palmer; George Searle
Baronetage of England
Preceded by Hugh Portman	Baronet (of Orchard); 1632–1645	Succeeded by William Portman
