= Edward Portman, 1st Viscount Portman =

British Whig politician

The Right Honourable The Viscount Portman
- Born: 9 July 1799; Dorset
- Died: 19 November 1888 (aged 89)
- Spouse: Lady Emma Lascelles (m. 1827; died 1865)
- Issue: 6, including Henry Portman, 2nd Viscount Portman, Edwin Berkeley Portman & Maurice Berkeley Portman
- Father: Edward Portman
- Mother: Lucy Whitby

Edward Berkeley Portman, 1st Viscount Portman (9 July 1799 – 19 November 1888) was a British Whig politician.

He was an active supporter of the Royal Agricultural Society of England from its commencement in 1838, and served as president in 1846, 1856, and 1862. He was a considerable breeder of Devon cattle and of improved Alderney cows.

== Background and education ==
Portman was born on 9 July 1799 to Edward Portman, of Bryanston and Orchard Portman in Dorset, and his first wife Lucy (10 March 1778 – 25 March 1812), elder daughter of Reverend Thomas Whitby of Cresswell Hall, Staffordshire. Portman was educated at Eton and Christ Church, Oxford. At Christ Church, he graduated with first-class honours, B.A. 1821, M.A. 1826.

== Political career ==
In 1823 Portman was elected to Parliament as a Whig for Dorsetshire, a seat he held until 1832, and then represented the newly created constituency of Marylebone from 12 December 1832 to March 1833. On 27 January 1837 Portman was raised to the peerage as Baron Portman of Orchard Portman, and became an active member of the House of Lords. Lord Portman served as Lord Lieutenant of Somerset from 22 May 1839 to June 1864. He was also a councillor and commissioner of the Duchy of Cornwall (starting 19 August 1840), a councillor of Duchy of Lancaster (on 13 February 1847) and as Lord Warden of the Stannaries from 20 January 1865 till his death. On 28 March 1873 he was further honoured when he was created Viscount Portman of Bryanston. Lord Portman died on 19 November 1888, aged 89, in Bryanston and was succeeded in the barony and viscountcy by his eldest son Henry Berkeley Portman. Another son, Edwin Berkeley Portman, became Member of Parliament for North Devon.

== Family ==
His father (Edward Portman 31 January 1771 - 19 January 1823) died in 1823. He was a descendant of Sir William Portman, Lord Chief Justice of England between 1555 and 1557. Lord Portman married Lady Emma Lascelles, third daughter of Henry Lascelles, 2nd Earl of Harewood, on 16 June 1827. They had six children, four sons and two daughters:

- William Henry Berkeley, 2nd Viscount Portman
- Edwin Berkeley
- Maurice Berkeley, a member of the Canadian parliament
- Walter Berkeley, rector of Corton-Denham, Somerset.

Emma died on 8 February 1865.

Parliament of the United Kingdom
Preceded by William Morton Pitt; Edward Portman	Member of Parliament for Dorset; 1823–1832; With: William Morton Pitt 1823–1826; Henry Bankes 1826–1831; John Calcraft 1831; Lord Ashley 1831–1832	Succeeded by Lord Ashley; William John Bankes; Hon. William Ponsonby
New constituency	Member of Parliament for Marylebone; 1832–1833; With: Sir William Horne	Succeeded by Sir William Horne; Sir Samuel Whalley
Honorary titles
Preceded by The Earl of Ilchester	Lord Lieutenant of Somerset; 1839–1864	Succeeded by The Earl of Cork
Preceded by The Duke of Newcastle	Lord Warden of the Stannaries; 1865–1888	Succeeded by The Earl of Ducie
Peerage of the United Kingdom
New creation	Viscount Portman; 1873–1888	Succeeded by Henry Portman
New creation	Baron Portman; 1837–1888	Succeeded by Henry Portman
