= Bryanston =

Village and civil parish in Dorset, England

Coordinates: 50.8583°N 2.1825°W

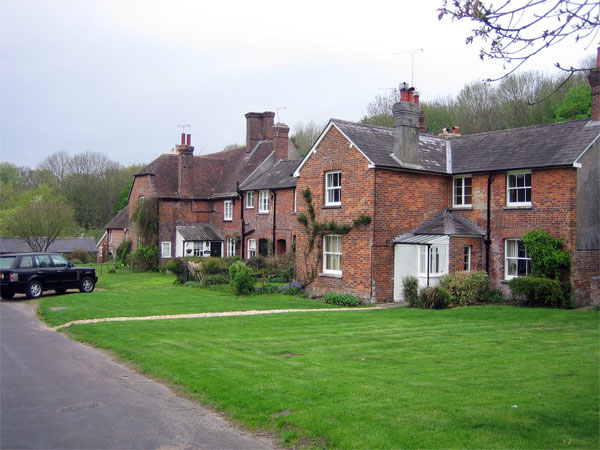
- Dwellings in Bryanston Village

- Location within Dorset
- Population: 925
- OS grid reference: ST871069
- Unitary authority: Dorset
- Ceremonial county: Dorset
- Region: South West
- Country: England
- Sovereign state: United Kingdom
- Post town: BLANDFORD FORUM
- Postcode district: DT11
- Police: Dorset
- Fire: Dorset and Wiltshire
- Ambulance: South Western
- UK Parliament: North Dorset

Bryanston /ˈbraɪənstən/ is a village and civil parish in north Dorset, England, situated on the River Stour 1 mile (1.5 kilometres) west of Blandford Forum. In the 2011 census the parish had a population of 925. The village is adjacent to the grounds of Bryanston School, an independent school.

The village was named after Brian de Lisle, a Baron at the court of King John. The Rogers family owned it for a long period of time, and it was later purchased by Sir William Portman, 6th Baronet, who took part in crushing Monmouth's rebellion in 1685. In the 1890s the Portman family built a large country house, designed by Richard Norman Shaw and set in 400 acres (160 hectares). Since 1927 the building has been the home of Bryanston School. In 1950 Viscount Portman gave up the Bryanston Estates as part payment of death duties. The estate was then owned by the crown until 2015 when the estate was purchased by a UK company held on behalf of the Viscount Rothermere and his son the Hon Vere Harmsworth for an initially undisclosed sum, which the Crown Estate confirmed in a Freedom Of Information request to have been £43 million.

== See also ==
- Bryanston Square in London
