= William Portman =

English judge and politician (died 1557)

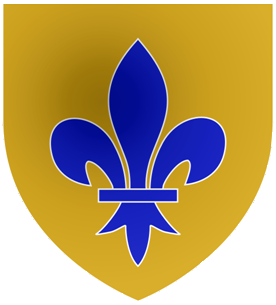
Arms of Portman: Or, a fleur-de-lis azure

Sir William Portman (died 1557) was an English judge, politician and Chief Justice of the King's Bench. He was MP for Taunton in 1529 and 1536, and an associate of Thomas Cromwell.

== Origins and early career ==
Portman was the son of John Portman, who was buried in the Temple Church on 5 June 1521, by Alice, daughter of William Knoyle of Sampford Orcas, Dorset. His family was long established in Somerset, having given its name to the former manor and present village of Orchard Portman, and he served as justice of the peace for that county from time to time. He was a barrister who was successful enough to be personally known to King Henry VIII. In 1532, he acquired 270 acres adjacent to the NW of the City of London, which estate stretching from today's Oxford Street to the Regents Canal, known as the Portman Estate, is still held by his descendants the Viscounts Portman. In 1533, Henry VIII gave him a wardship, and he was one of the administrators of the will of Catherine of Aragon.

== Judicial career ==
He was made a judge in 1547, and knighted by King Edward VI. When Richard Rich, later 1st Baron Rich was ill, Portman was one of those who, by letters patent of 26 October 1551, were commissioned to despatch chancery matters; and in the following January he was commissioned to aid the Lord Keeper of the Great Seal, Thomas Goodrich, Bishop of Ely, in similar affairs. He seems to have been reluctant to adopt the new Protestant religion, and found no difficulty in keeping office under the catholic Queen Mary. He followed Day, the Bishop of Chichester, in persuading Sir James Hales to abjure Protestantism in 1554. The same year, he was made Lord Chief Justice of England and Wales. He died early in 1556–7, and was buried, with a stately funeral, on 10 February 1556–7 at St Dunstan-in-the-West, London.

== Marriage and progeny ==
He married Elizabeth, daughter and heiress of John Gilbert, who was connected by descent with the eminent legal family of Fitzjames. By her he had a son and a daughter:

- Sir Henry Portman, knight (died 1590), married Jane Mitchell and produced issue:
  - Sir John Portman, 1st Baronet (d.1611/12)
  - Joan Portman, married pre-1613 Sir John Wyndham (1558–1645), of Orchard Wyndham, Somerset.
  - Margaret Portman, married (1) Sir Gabriel Hawley; (2) Sir John Acland, Sheriff of Devon 1608, son of John Acland by Margaret Redcliffe.
- Mary, who married John Stowell.
