= Orchard Portman =

Village in Somerset, England

Coordinates: 50.9879°N 3.0770°W

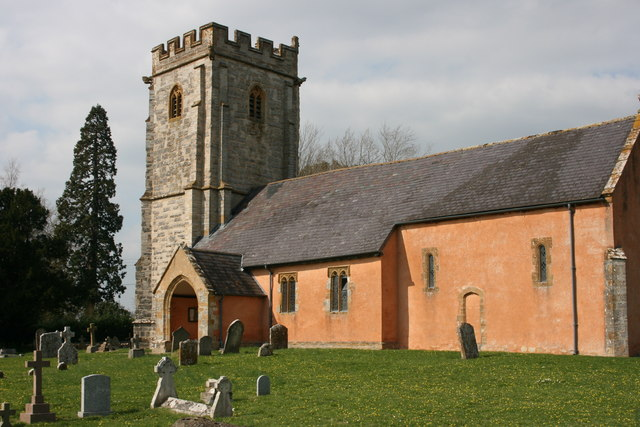
- Church of St Thomas, Thurlbear

- Location within Somerset
- Population: 150 (2011)
- OS grid reference: ST245215
- Unitary authority: Somerset Council
- Ceremonial county: Somerset
- Region: South West
- Country: England
- Sovereign state: United Kingdom
- Post town: TAUNTON
- Postcode district: TA3
- Dialling code: 01823
- Police: Avon and Somerset
- Fire: Devon and Somerset
- Ambulance: South Western
- UK Parliament: Taunton and Wellington

Orchard Portman is a village and civil parish in Somerset, England, situated 2 miles (3.2 km) south of Taunton. The village has a population of 150.

The parish includes the hamlet of Thurlbear and the nearby Thurlbear Wood and Quarrylands Site of Special Scientific Interest. St Thomas' church in Thurlbear is home to the heaviest complete set (cast together at the same time) of four church bells in the world.

== History ==
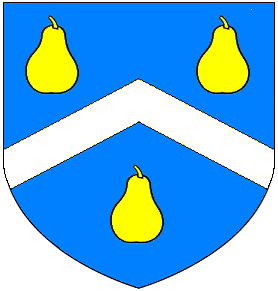
Arms of de Orchard of Orchard (Portman) in Somerset: Azure, a chevron argent between three pears pendant or

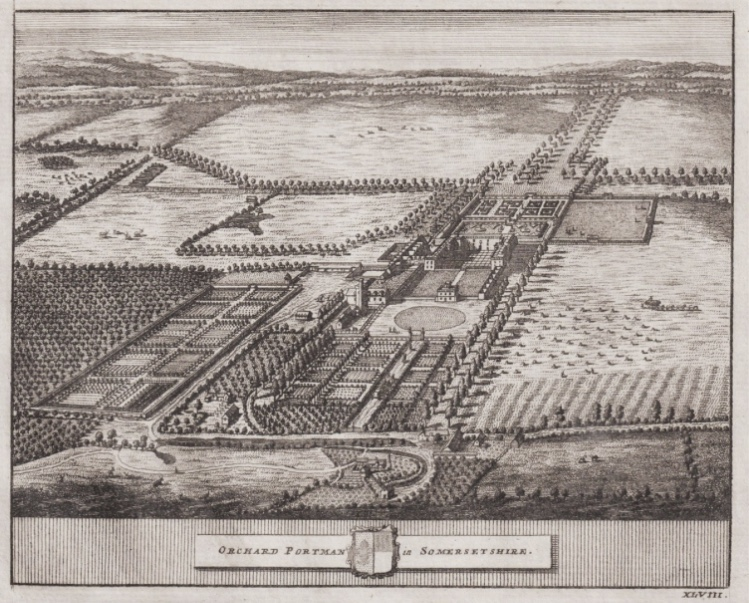
Orchard Portman engraved by Pieter van der Aa about 1707

The estate was known as Orceard and was given by King Æthelwulf of Wessex to Taunton's minster church in 854.

The parish of Thurlbear was part of the North Curry Hundred, while Orchard Portman was part of the Taunton Deane Hundred.

By 1135 the manor had passed to Elfric de Orchard and his descendants one of whom, Christina de Orchard, married Walter Portman. The village takes the second part of its name from the Portman family, one of the earliest prominent members of which was Sir William Portman (died 1557), Chief Justice of the King’s Bench and lord of the manor. The estate was sold to the Commissioners of Crown Lands in 1944.

== Governance ==
For local government purposes, since 1 April 2023, the village comes under the unitary authority of Somerset Council. Prior to this, it was part of the non-metropolitan district of Somerset West and Taunton (formed on 1 April 2019) and, before this, the district of Taunton Deane (established under the Local Government Act 1972). From 1894-1974, for local government purposes, Orchard Portman was part of Taunton Rural District.

Almost all local government services are provided by Somerset Council. The parish council has responsibility for some matters within the parish and sets an annual precept within the overall Council Tax to cover its own operating costs and annual accounts. The parish council is consulted on local planning applications and receives reports from the police, unitary council, and neighbourhood watch on matters of crime, security, and traffic. The parish council's role also includes initiating projects for the maintenance and repair of parish facilities, as well as advising Somerset Council on the maintenance, repair, and improvement of highways, drainage, footpaths, public transport, and street cleaning. Conservation matters (including trees and listed buildings) and environmental issues are the responsibility of Somerset Council.

The village is also part of the Taunton and Wellington county constituency, represented in the House of Commons. This elects one Member of Parliament (MP) by the first past the post system of election.

== Religious sites ==
The Church of St Michael, Orchard Portman, has Norman origins, with the chancel having been rebuilt in the early 15th century. It formed part of the former Portman country house on the site. The Portman chapel was erected as the south aisle around 1450, demolished in 1844, and rebuilt again in 1910. The tower was rebuilt in 1521. Dr Thomas Bond (1841–1901) a British physician considered by some to be the first offender profiler, and best known for his association with the notorious Jack the Ripper murders of 1888, is buried in the churchyard.

The former parish church of St Thomas at Thurlbear is a redundant church, in the care of the Churches Conservation Trust since 1988. It shows clear signs of the Norman church upon which later structures were built. Pevsner cites the Norman arcades and narrow aisles characteristic of that era and "never enlarged to satisfy later medieval taste" and dates the church to "hardly later than c. 1110." The Churches Conservation Trust launched a programme of repairs at the church, with the Somerset County Council conducting an archaeological recording and survey in conjunction with these efforts.

== Sport ==
Orchard Portman is the location of Taunton Racecourse which is used for thoroughbred horse racing, as well as a small cricket field and the Taunton Vale Polo Club.
