= Street names of Marylebone =

This is a list of the etymology of street names in the London district of Marylebone.

Many of the names refer to the Portman family who owned this estate since William Portman acquired it in the 16th century; or to the Dukes of Portland, who owned much of this land following the marriage of William Bentinck, 2nd Duke of Portland to heiress Lady Margaret Harley in 1734. Margaret was the daughter of Edward Harley, 2nd Earl of Oxford and Earl Mortimer, and his wife née Lady Henrietta Cavendish Holles, who inherited land here from her maternal grandfather Henry Cavendish, 2nd Duke of Newcastle.

== A ==
- Aldburgh Mews
- All Soul's Place – after the adjacent All Souls Church
- Ashland Place – thought to be a Victorian-era alteration of its former name Burying Ground Passage, after the adjacent St Marylebone Parish Church
- Aybrook Street – roughly follows the path of the former Aye (or Eye) Brook.

== B ==
- Baker's Mews and Baker Street – after Edward Baker, friend and business partner of the Portman family
- Barrett Street – after Thomas Barret, local 18th century landowner
- Beaumont Mews and Beaumont Street – after Sir Beaumont Hotham, local leaseholder in the late 18th century
- Bentinck Mews and Bentinck Street – after William Bentinck, 2nd Duke of Portland, who inherited the local estate after marrying Margaret Bentinck, Duchess of Portland in 1734
- Berkeley Mews and Upper Berkeley Street – after Henry William Berkeley, who inherited the local Portman estate via his mother
- Beverston Mews
- Bingham Place – after Bingham in Nottinghamshire, where the dukes of Portland owned property
- Bird Street – after Thomas Bird, local 18th century bricklayer
- Blandford Street – after Blandford Forum, Dorset, where the Portman family had a seat
- Bourne Mews
- Brendon Street – unknown
- Bridford Mews – after Bridford in Devon, by association with the nearby Devonshire Street
- Broadstone Place – after Broadstone, Dorset, where the dukes of Portland owned property
- Brown Street – named after Mr Brown, local 19th century builder
- Browning Mews – after the poet Robert Browning, who married local resident Elizabeth Barrett, herself a poet
- Brunswick Mews – after the Brunswick Chapel, formerly located near here on Upper Berkeley Street
- Bryanston Mews East, Bryanston Mews West, Bryanston Place, Bryanston Square and Bryanston Street – after Bryanston in Dorset, where the dukes of Portland owned property
- Bulstrode Place and Bulstrode Street – after local landowners the Bentinck family, who also owned land at Bulstrode Park in Buckinghamshire

== C ==
- Cabbell Street – after George Cabbell, local landowner in the 1790s
- Castlereagh Street – after Robert Stewart, 2nd Marquess of Londonderry, Lord Castlereagh, prominent politician of the 17th – 18th centuries
- Cato Street – named by landowner John Harcourt, in allusion to the Roman Cato; it was changed for a period to Horace Street (after the Roman poet) owing to the notoriety of the Cato Street conspiracy, but the original name was restored
- Cavendish Mews North, Cavendish Mews South, Cavendish Place, Cavendish Square, Cavendish Street, New Cavendish Street and Old Cavendish Street – after Henry Cavendish, 2nd Duke of Newcastle-upon-Tyne, father of Henrietta Harley, Countess of Oxford and Countess Mortimer, who married Edward Harley, 2nd Earl of Oxford and Earl Mortimer, landowner
- Chandos Street – after the Duke of Chandos, who built a mansion nearby in the 1710s
- Chapel Place – after the nearby St Peter, Vere Street church, formerly a chapel of ease
- Chapel Street – after a former chapel on this site, opened 1772, closed in the 1850s
- Chiltern Street – after the nearby Marylebone station, from where train to the Chiltern Hills of Buckinghamshire depart
- Circus Mews – the street to which it adjoins, Enford Street, was formerly supposed to lead to a circus (Junction), however it was never built
- Clarke's Mews – after William Clarke, local 18th century landowner
- Clenston Mews – after Winterborne Clenston in Dorset, where the Portman family owned land
- Cramer Street – after the violinist Wilhelm Cramer, who lived near here
- Crawford Mews, Crawford Place and Crawford Street – after Tarrant Crawford in Dorset, where the Portman family owned land
- Cross Keys Close – after the former Cross Keys tavern here, named for local 18th century street developer Philip Keys

== D ==
- David Mews – after David Porter, builder of the nearby Montagu Square
- Dean's Mews – thought to be for a Catholic college formerly located here
- Devonshire Close, Devonshire Mews North, Devonshire Mews South, Devonshire Mews West, Devonshire Place, Devonshire Place Mews, Devonshire Row Mews and Devonshire Street – after local landowner the Cavendish family, who had a branch which became the dukes of Devonshire
- De Walden Street – after Baroness Howard de Walden, local landowner
- Dorset Street – after Dorset, where the Portman family owned much land
- Duchess Mews and Duchess Street – by association with the dukes and duchesses of Portland, possibly specifically Dorothy Duchess of Portland
- Duke's Mews and Duke Street – it is unknown precisely which duke, if any, this street commemorates
- Dunstable Mews – unknown; prior to 1935 it was Upper Wimpole Mews
- Durweston Street – after Durweston, Dorset, where the Portman family owned land

== E ==
- Easleys Mews – after Abraham Easley, 18th-century landowner
- Edgware Road – as it leads to Edgware, Middlesex
- Edwards Mews – after Edward Gray, local 18th century leaseholder
- Enford Street – after Enford, Dorset, where the Portman family owned land; the street was formerly known as Circus Street

== F ==
- Fitzhardinge Street – after Viscount Fitzhardinge, relative of Henry William Berkeley, local landowner
- Forset Street – after Edward Forset (or Forsett), surveyor with the department of works, who owned land here in the 16th – 17th century

== G ==
- Garbutt Place – named in 1894 after William Garbutt, local vestry clerk and later borough town clerk
- Gee's Court
- George Street – after king George III, reigning king when the street was built
- Gildea Street
- Gloucester Place and Gloucester Place Mews – after Prince William, Duke of Cumberland, Duke of Gloucester, son of King George II
- Granville Place – probably after Granville George Leveson-Gower, 2nd Earl Granville, prominent Victorian politician
- Gray's Yard – after Edward Gray, local leaseholder of the 18th century
- Great Castle Street – after the former nearby pub The Castle
- Great Cumberland Mews and Great Cumberland Place – after Prince William, Duke of Cumberland, son of King George II; it was formerly Tyburn Gate, after the brook that ran here
- Grotto Passage – site of a former shell grotto owned by John Castle, closed circa 1760

== H ==
- Hallam Mews and Hallam Street – after Henry Hallam, 19th-century historian who lived nearby
- Hampden Gurney Street – after Reverend John Hampden Gurney, rector of St Mary's, Bryanston Square in the mid-19th century
- Harcourt Street – after John Harcourt, local landowner and resident in the 18th century
- Harley Place and Harley Street – after Lady Margaret Harley who became Duchess of Portland by marriage
- Harrowby Street – after Dudley Ryder, 1st Earl of Harrowby, early 19th-century politician, by association with the Cato Street conspiracy at which he would have been killed had it succeeded
- Henrietta Place – after Henrietta Harley, Countess of Oxford and Countess Mortimer, daughter of Henry Cavendish, 2nd Duke of Newcastle-upon-Tyne
- Hinde Mews and Hinde Street – after Jacob Hinde, husband of Anne Thayer, who inherited this land from her father Thomas Thayer
- Holles Street – after John Holles, 1st Duke of Newcastle-upon-Tyne, who bought the local estate in 1708
- Homer Row and Homer Street – named by local landowner John Harcourt, either in honour of the ancient Greek poet Homer or his neighbour Edward Homer, possibly both

== J ==
- Jacob's Well Mews – after Jacob Hinde, husband of Anne Thayer, who inherited this land from her father Thomas Thayer
- James Street – unknown
- Jason's Court
- John Prince's Street – after John Prince, surveyor to the Cavendish-Harley estate in the 1710s

== K ==
- Kendall Place – after William Kendall, local builder and timber merchant in the 18th century
- Kenrick Place – after William Kenrick, local lecturer and writer in the 18th century
- Knox Street – unknown

== L ==
- Langham Place and Langham Street – after Sir James Langham, who owned a house near here in the early 19th century
- Luxborough Street – unknown

== M ==
- Manchester Mews, Manchester Square and Manchester Street – after Manchester House (now Hertford House) which stood here, home to the dukes of Manchester, built 1776
- Mandeville Place – after the duke of Manchester as above, also known as Viscount Mandeville
- Mansfield Mews and Mansfield Street – after Henry Cavendish, 2nd Duke of Newcastle-upon-Tyne, Viscount Mansfield, father-in-law of local landowner Edward Harley, 2nd Earl of Oxford and Earl Mortimer
- Marble Arch – after the Marble Arch erected here in 1851
- Margaret Street – after Margaret Bentinck, Duchess of Portland, daughter of local landowner Edward Harley, 2nd Earl of Oxford and Earl Mortimer
- Marylebone Circus, Marylebone High Street, Marylebone Lane, Marylebone Mews, Marylebone Road, Marylebone Street and Old Marylebone Road – from a church dedicated to St Mary, represented now by St Marylebone Parish Church (1817); the original church was built on the bank of a small stream or "bourne", called the Tybourne or Tyburn. This stream rose further north in what is now Swiss Cottage, eventually running along what is now Marylebone Lane, which preserves its curve within the grid pattern. The church and the surrounding area later became known as St Mary at the Bourne which, over time, became shortened to its present form, Marylebone.
- Molyneux Street – presumably after Molyneux Shuldham, 18th-century naval officer
- Montagu Mews North, Montagu Mews South, Montague Mews West, Montagu Place, Montagu Square, Montagu Street and Upper Montagu Street – after Montagu House which formerly stood near here and was home to prominent 18th century figure Elizabeth Montagu
- Mortimer Street – after Edward Harley, 2nd Earl of Oxford and Earl Mortimer, who inherited the estate via his marriage to Henrietta Harley, Countess of Oxford and Countess Mortimer in 1713
- Moxon Street – after the former Moxon apartment block on this street; prior to 1936 it was ‘Paradise Street’, after an old burial ground near here – it was changed to avoid confusion with other streets of this name

== N ==
- Nottingham Place and Nottingham Street – after Nottinghamshire, where the dukes of Portland owned property
- Nutford Place – after Nutford in Dorset, where the Portman family owned land

== O ==
- Oldbury Place – unknown
- Orchard Street – after Orchard Portman in Somerset, where the Portman family owned property
- Ossington Buildings – after Charlotte, Viscountess Ossington, local landowner and heiress to the Cavendish-Harley estate
- Oxford Circus and Oxford Street – after Edward Harley, 2nd Earl of Oxford and Earl Mortimer who owned much of the local estate; prior to this it was known as Tyburn Road, as it led to the Tyburn gibbet at what is now Marble Arch. Circus is a British term for a road junction; it was formerly Regent Circus, after Regent Street

== P ==
- Paddington Street – this was on old path leading to Paddington
- Park Crescent, Park Crescent Mews East and Park Crescent Mews West – as they are adjacent to Regent's Park
- Picton Place – after Thomas Picton, general who lived near here before his death at the Battle of Waterloo
- Portman Close, Portman Mews South, Portman Square and Portman Street – after the Portman family who owned this estate since William Portman acquired it in the 16th century; he was originally from Orchard Portman, Somerset
- Portland Place, Great Portland Street and Little Portland Street – after the Dukes of Portland, who owned much of this land following the marriage of William Bentinck, 2nd Duke of Portland to heiress Margaret Bentinck, Duchess of Portland in 1734
- Porter Street – after David Porter, builder of the nearby Montagu Square

== Q ==
- Quebec Mews, New Quebec Street and Old Quebec Street – after the former Quebec Chapel on this site, named after the Battle of Quebec, built 1787 demolished in 1912
- Queen Anne Mews and Queen Anne Street – after Queen Anne; it was originally meant to lead to a square called Queen Anne Square, however this was never completed

== R ==
- Regent Street – made in the 1810s by John Nash and named after the Prince Regent, later George IV
- Riding House Street – unknown, presumably for a local riding school; it was formerly Riding House Lane
- Robert Adam Street – after Robert Adam, 18th-century architect; originally it was just Adams Street, after 18th century developer Samuel Adams
- Romney Mews

== S ==
- St Christopher's Place – Octavia Hill, social reformer, cleared the slums of this area and named it in honour of St Christopher; formerly it was Barrett's Court, after Thomas Barret, local 18th century landowner
- St Vincent Street – after the nearby school founded by the Sisters of Charity of Saint Vincent de Paul
- Salisbury Place – after the Salisbury brothers (Isaac, John and Thomas), local 18th century builders
- Seymour Mews, Seymour Place and Seymour Street – after Anne Seymour, mother of Henry William Portman, and through whom he inherited the estate
- Sherlock Mews – after the fictional detective Sherlock Holmes, who lived on Baker Street
- Shillibeer Place – after George Shillibeer, owner of a local coaching business in the 19th century
- Shouldham Street – after Molyneux Shuldham, 18th-century naval officer
- Spanish Place – nearby Hertford House on Manchester Square was formerly home to the Spanish ambassador
- Stratford Place – after Edward Stratford, who owned a house nearby and built this street in the 1770s
- Stourcliffe Street

== T ==
- Tarrant Place – probably after Tarrant Crawford in Dorset, where the Portman family owned land
- Thayer Street – after Anne Thayer, who inherited this land from her father Thomas Thayer; the street was built in the 1770s by her husband Jacob Hinde
- Thornton Place – after Sophia Thornton, mother of Ronald Leslie-Melville, 11th Earl of Leven; the earl married Emma Selina Portman, whose brother Gerald Berkeley Portman, 7th Viscount Portman, named this street in her honour
- Transept Street – after a former chapel on this site, opened 1772, closed in the 1850s,or possibly after the former cross shape created by this street crossing Chapel Street

== V ==
- Vere Street – named by the Harley family, earls of Oxford in honour of the De Vere family, who had held the earldom from 1155 until 1703 when the 20th earl died without issue
- Virgil Place – named by landowner John Harcourt, in allusion to the Roman poet Virgil

== W ==
- Walmer Place and Walmer Stree
- Watson's Mews – after John Watson, local 18th century leaseholder
- Welbeck Street and Welbeck Way – after Welbeck Abbey in Nottinghamshire, seat of William Bentinck, 2nd Duke of Portland
- Wesley Street – after Charles Wesley, hymn author, who is buried nearby
- Westmorland Street – unknown
- Weymouth Mews and Weymouth Street – after Lady Elizabeth Bentinck, Viscountess Weymouth, daughter of William Bentinck, 2nd Duke of Portland
- Wheatley Street – after Francis Wheatley, Victorian artist who lived in the area
- Wigmore Place and Wigmore Street – after Wigmore Castle in Herefordshire, seat of Edward Harley, 2nd Earl of Oxford and Earl Mortimer
- Wimpole Mews, Wimpole Street and Upper Wimpole Street – after Wimpole Hall in Cambridgeshire, seat of Edward Harley, 2nd Earl of Oxford and Earl Mortimer
- Woodstock Mews – after William Bentinck, 2nd Duke of Portland, Viscount Woodstock
- Wyndham Mews, Wyndham Street and Wyndham Yard – after Anne Wyndham, wife of local landowner Henry Portman
- Wythburn Place – after Wythburn Fells, Cumberland, by association with the nearby Great Cumberland Place

== Y ==
- York Street – after Prince Frederick, Duke of York and Albany, brother of King George IV
