= James Street, Marylebone =

Street in Marylebone, London

Coordinates: 51°30′55.42″N 0°9′2.81″W

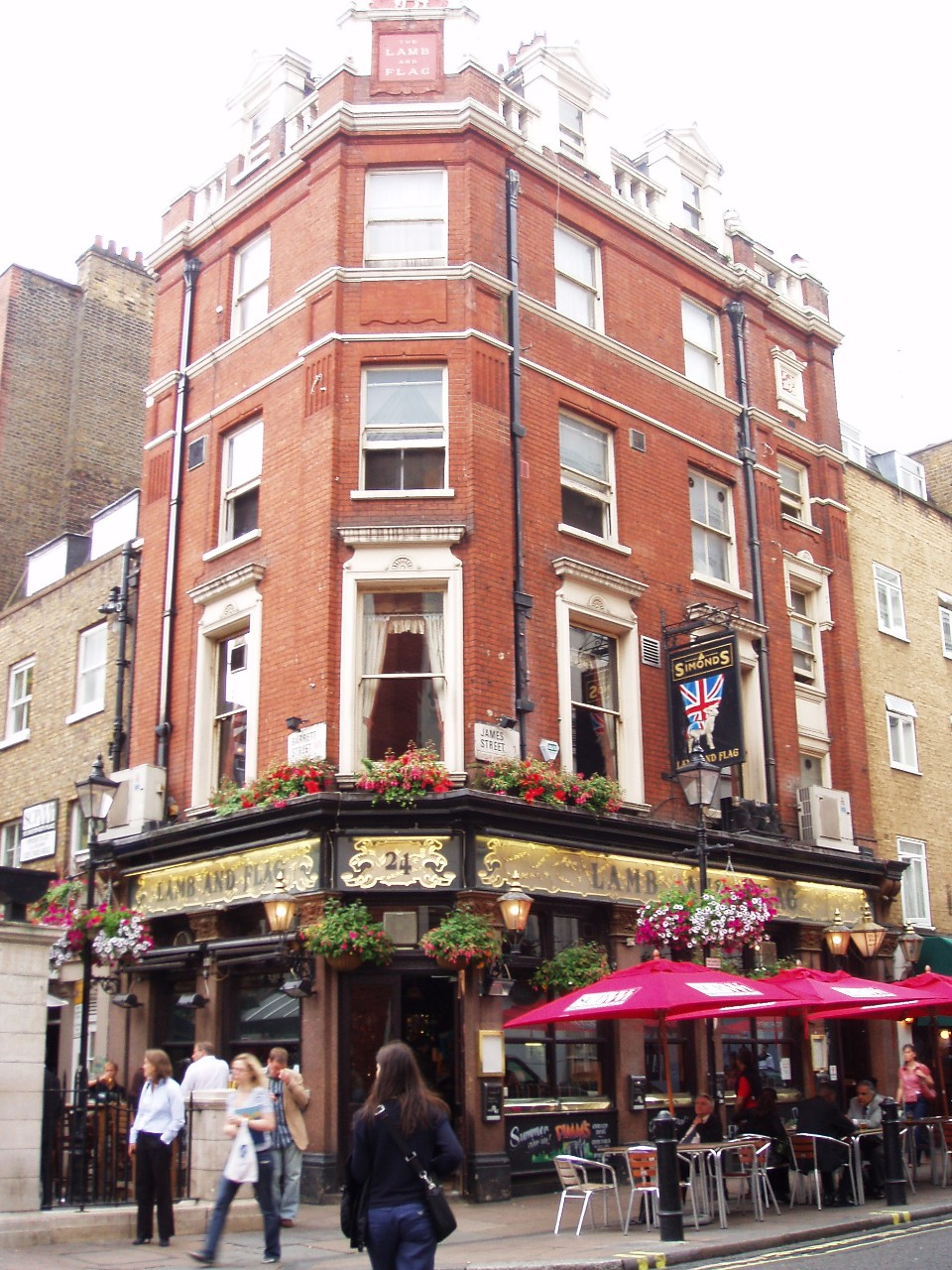
The Lamb and Flag public house on the corner of James Street and Barrett Street

James Street is a street in the Marylebone district of the City of Westminster, London, off Oxford Street, that is known for the high number of restaurants and bars that it contains.

== Location ==
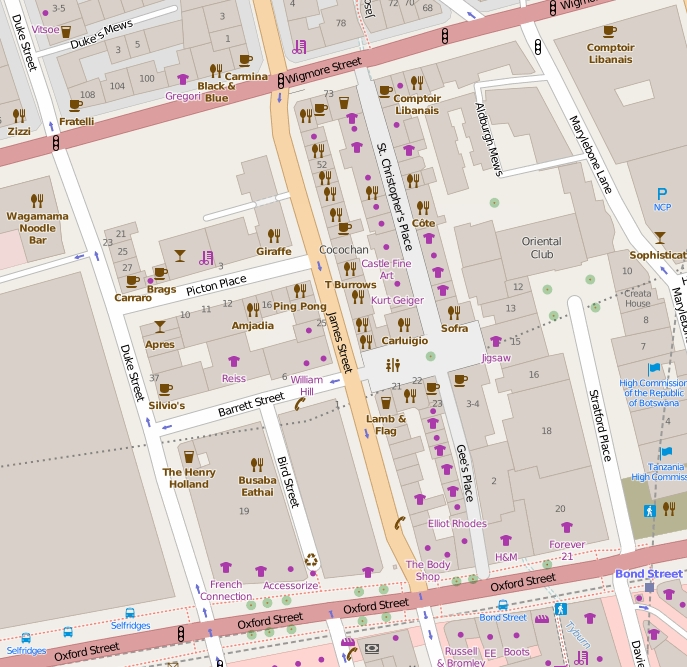
The immediate vicinity of James Street

James Street runs from the junction of Mandeville Place and Wigmore Street in the north to the junction of Oxford Street and Gilbert Street in the south. On its western side it is joined by Gray's Yard in the north, which is a gated cul-de-sac with flats above, Picton Place and Barrett Street.

== History ==
James Street was laid out around 1761–9.

In 1936, the London County Council tried to rename the street Marylebone High Street, along with Thayer Street and Mandeville Place so that the whole north–south route from Oxford Street to Marylebone Road would have the same name. The proposal was opposed by both the occupants of Mandeville Place, who felt that they did not want to lose the higher class associations of the street in order to be associated with shopkeepers, and the shopkeepers and small traders of the other streets who worried about the cost of the change, possible customer confusion, and the association with Marylebone Road rather than the posher Oxford Street they were nearer. The proposal did not go ahead.

== Buildings ==
The street is mostly composed of terraced houses with small shops and restaurants on the ground floor and some larger buildings on the western side.

Number 56 on the east side is a grade II listed building with Historic England.
