= Marylebone Lane =

Street in Marylebone, London

Coordinates: 51°30′59.12″N 0°9′1.35″W

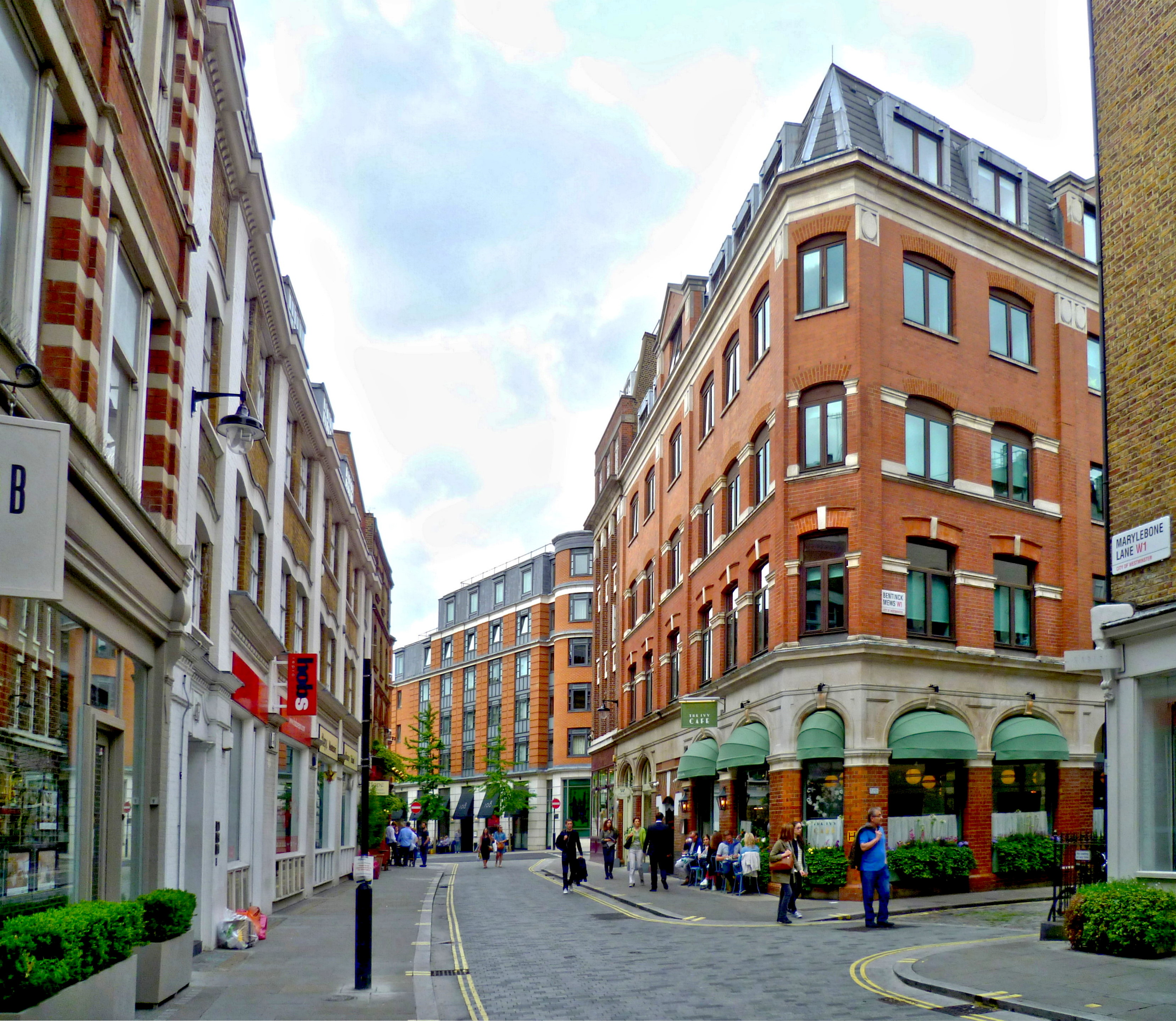
The north end of the lane

Marylebone Lane is one of the original streets of the Marylebone district of the City of Westminster, London. It runs from Oxford Street in the south to Marylebone High Street in the north, its winding shape following the course of the River Tyburn that it once ran alongside and pre-dating the grid pattern of the other streets in the area. Today the lane is largely composed of small shops, cafes and restaurants with some small apartment blocks. There are some larger commercial buildings at the southern end near Oxford Street.

== History ==
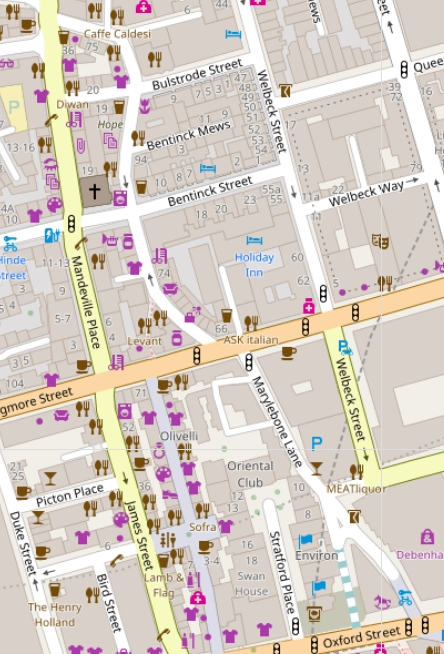
Marylebone Lane map

Marylebone Lane dates back to the original medieval village of Tyburn, which stood at the south end of the lane near Oxford Street where Stratford Place is now. The lane followed the course of the River Tyburn, which once ran south alongside it before crossing Oxford Street, giving the lane a narrow and winding character that is still preserved today and making what Tony Aldous called a "rustic diagonal". The Tyburn has since been culverted and enclosed. and now runs entirely underground. The area became part of London after it was urbanised using a grid plan in the early 1700s.

== Location ==
Marylebone Lane runs from Oxford Street in the south, where it is now pedestrianised, to the beginning of Marylebone High Street in the north. The junction with Oxford Street was once split into two with a small group of buildings between the two entrances. In the south it is joined by Henrietta Place on its eastern side and crossed by Wigmore Street halfway up. Jason Court and Hinde Mews join it on the western side above Wigmore Street and Hinde Street joins it on the west and continues eastwards as Bentinck Street. Bentinck Mews runs off Marylebone Lane on its eastern side and the street is crossed by Bulstrode Street in the north. At its northern end, Bulstrode Place and Cross Keys Close join Marylebone Lane on its eastern side before the lane joins Marylebone High Street.

== Character ==
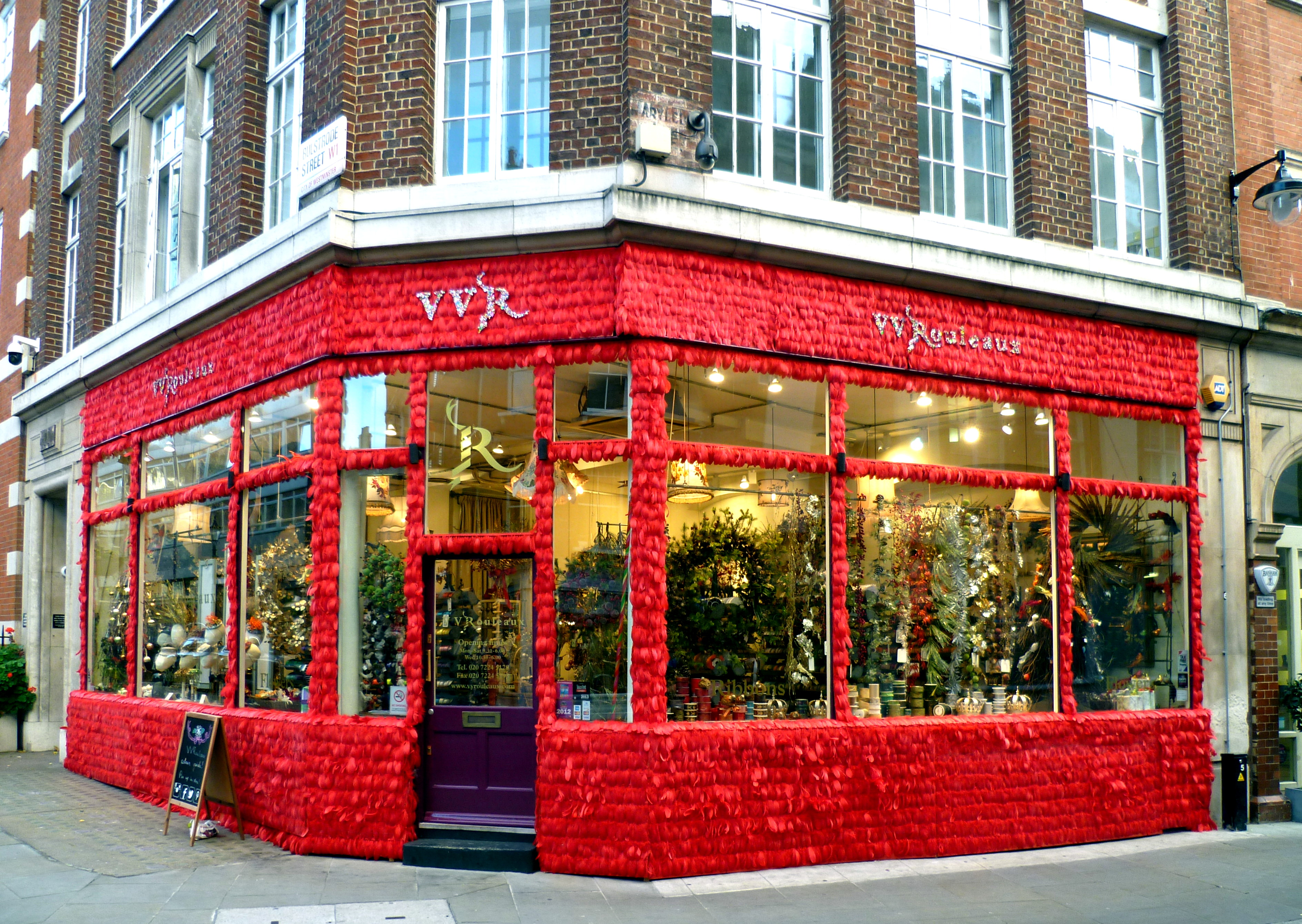
V.V. Rouleaux, haberdashers, November 2016

Marylebone Lane is mostly made up of small shops, boutiques, cafes, restaurants and pubs, with some small apartment blocks. The haberdashers V.V. Rouleaux are at number 102 and The Ivy Cafe at the north end of the lane.

Marylebone Lane has three public houses:

- The Golden Eagle, late Victorian, on the corner with Bulstrode Street.
- The Coach Makers (formerly The Conduit of Tybourne) on the corner with Bentinck Street.
- The Angel in the Fields on the corner with upper Thayer Street.

The southern part of the street includes some larger buildings, such as the M Building which replaced the Debenhams department store, which borders the street, and the Radisson Blu Edwardian, Berkshire hotel. It used to also contain the entrance to the Welbeck Street Car Park (since replace by the BoTree Hotel Building) in the southern part of Marylebone Lane, adjacent to the London Steinway Hall.

The Marylebone Court House once stood at the south end of the street and was erected by the Earl of Oxford as a manorial court. It was demolished and rebuilt in 1825 but retained the same name. After no longer being used as a court it became Marylebone Town Hall for a time and was also used as a hall for public speaking.

== Gallery ==
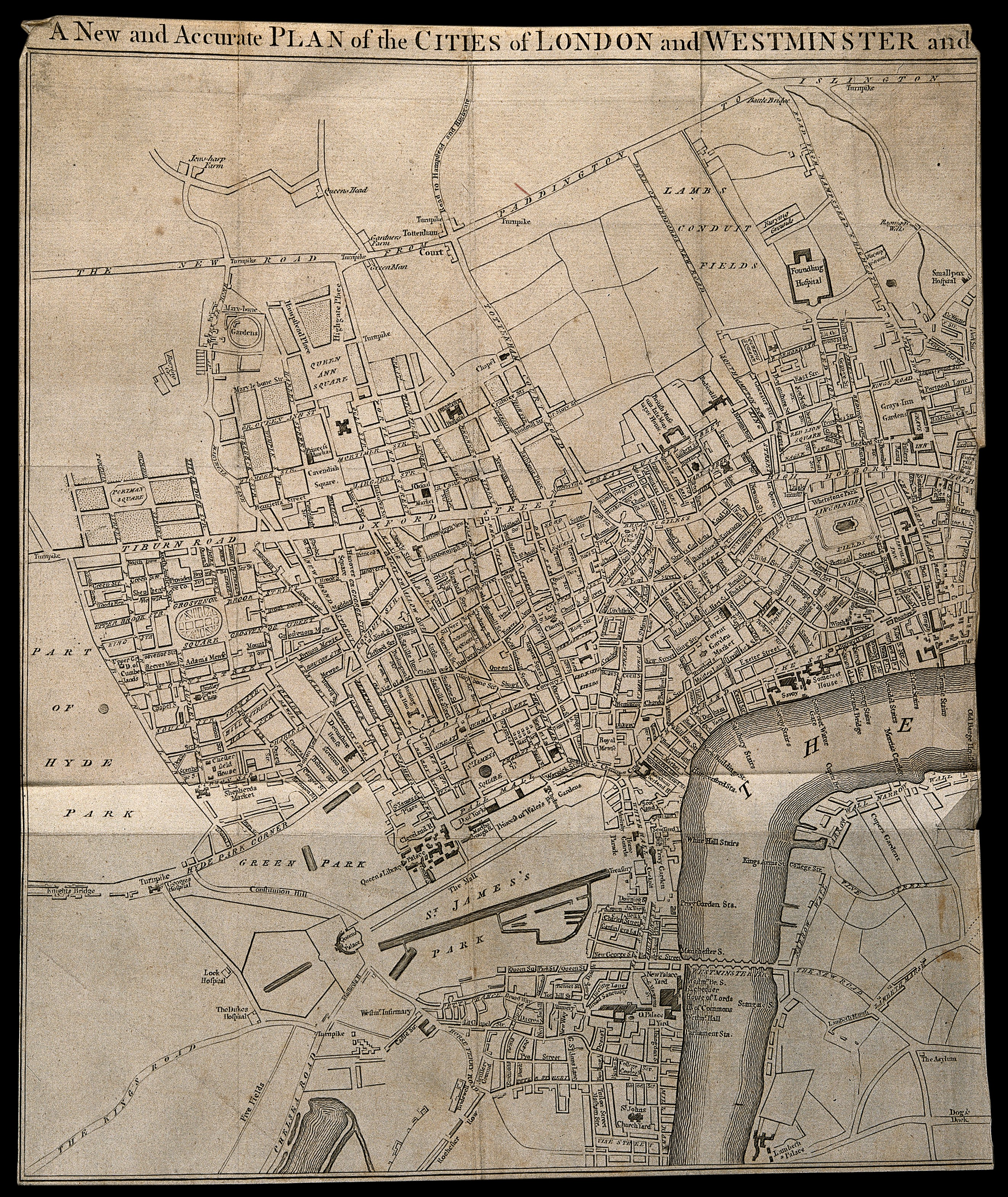
Marylebone Lane (upper left) on a 1764 map when it was on the fringes of London

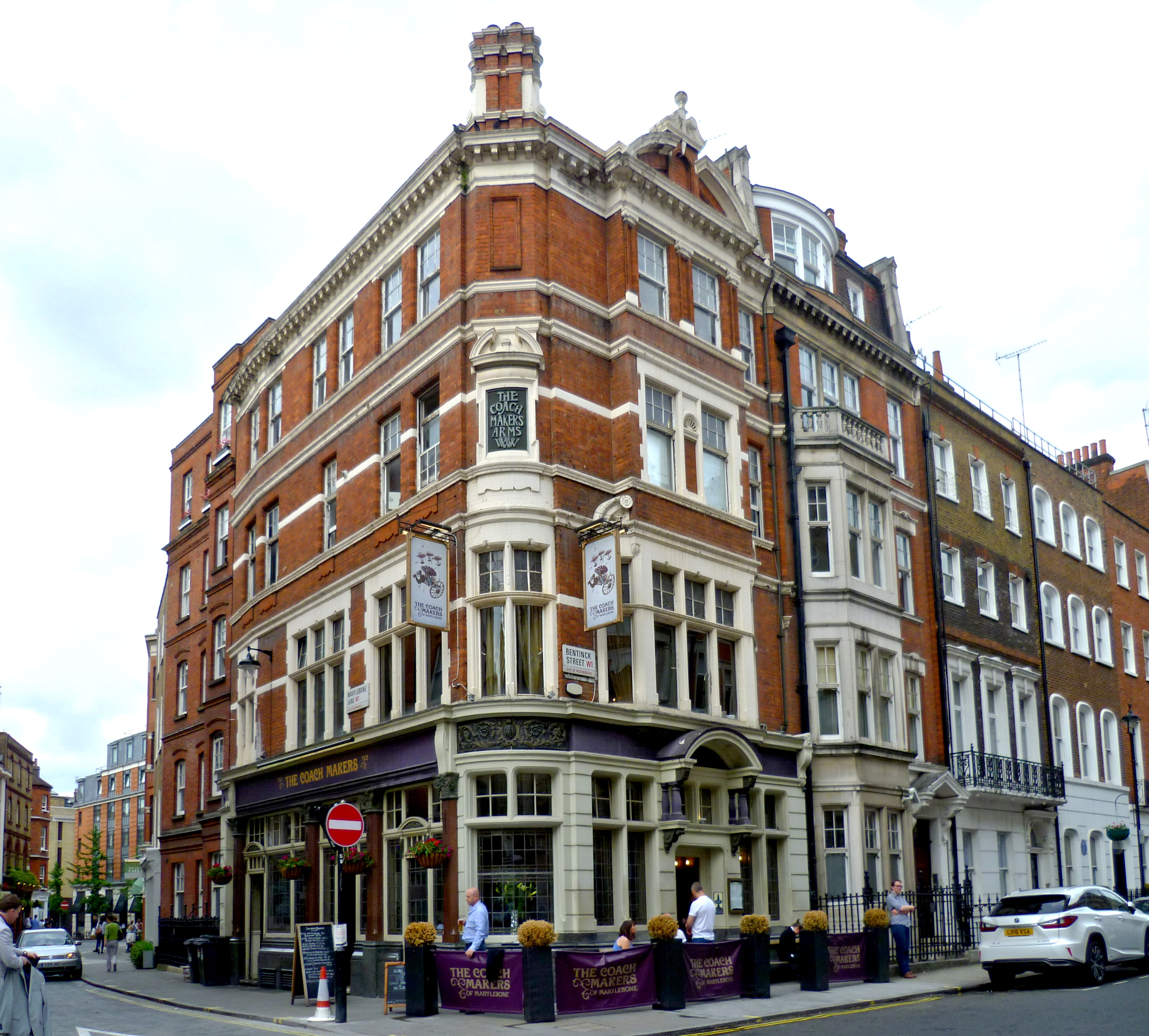
The Coachmakers pub

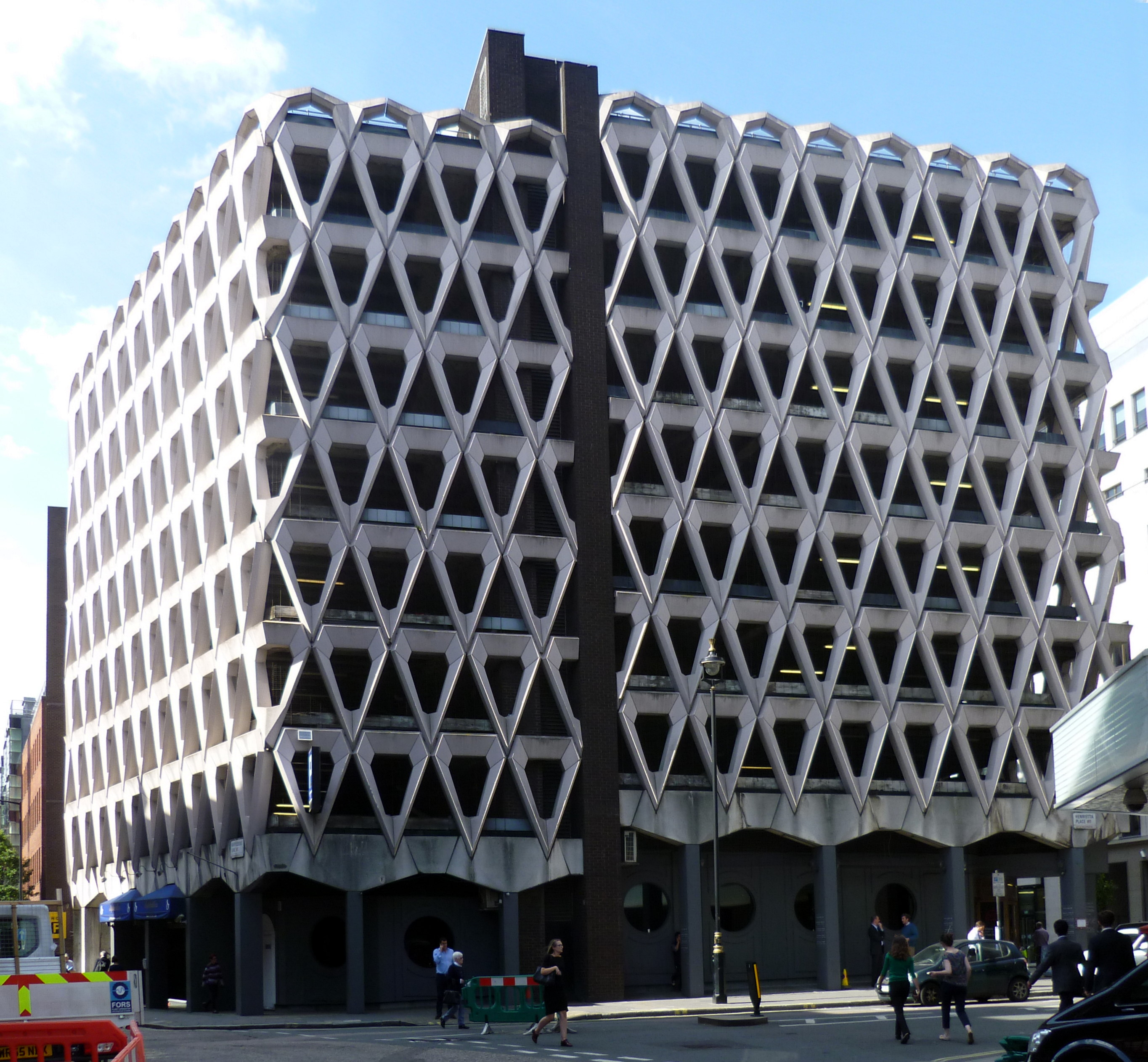
The Welbeck Street Car Park

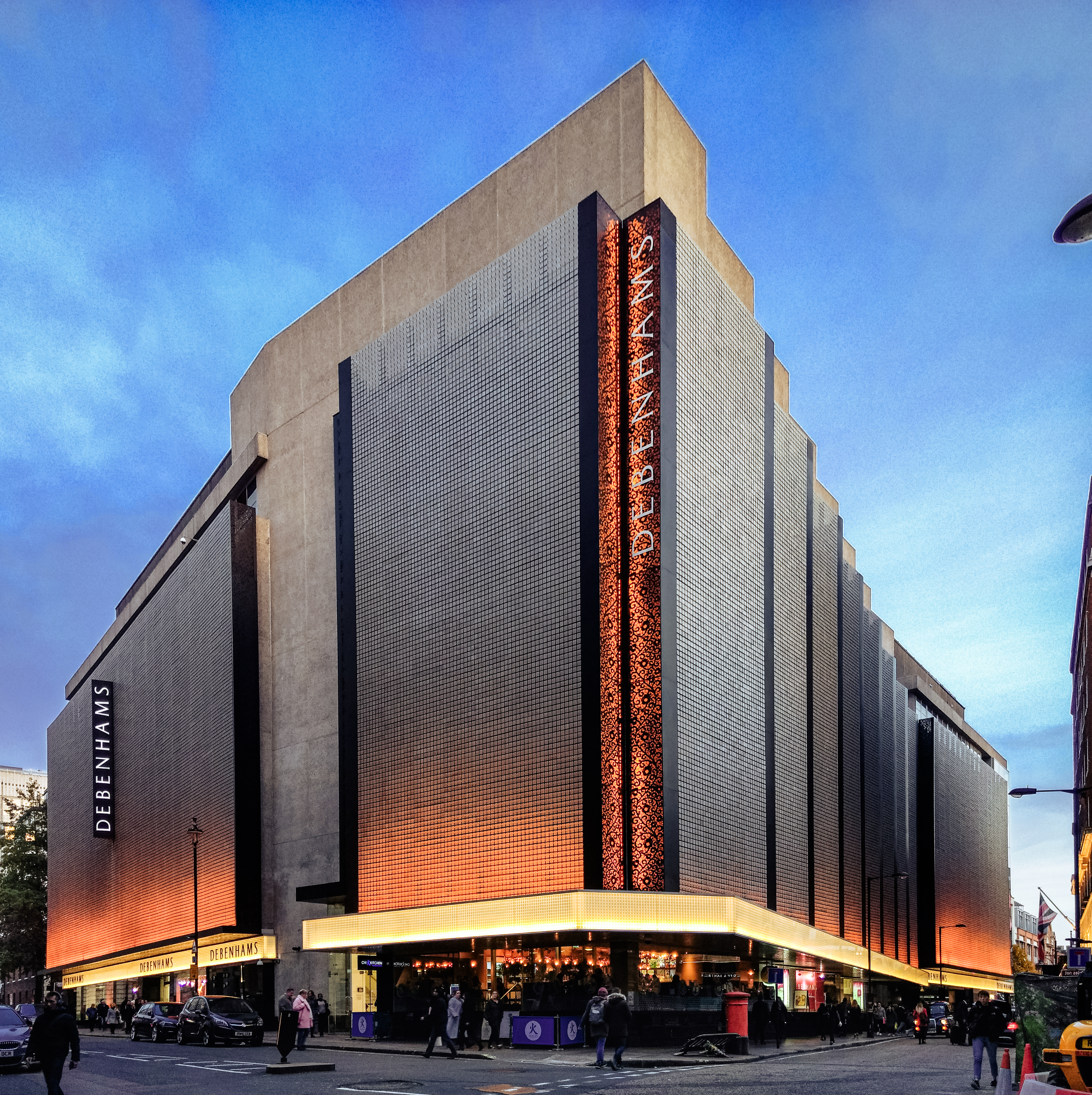
Debenhams department store on the corner with Henrietta Place

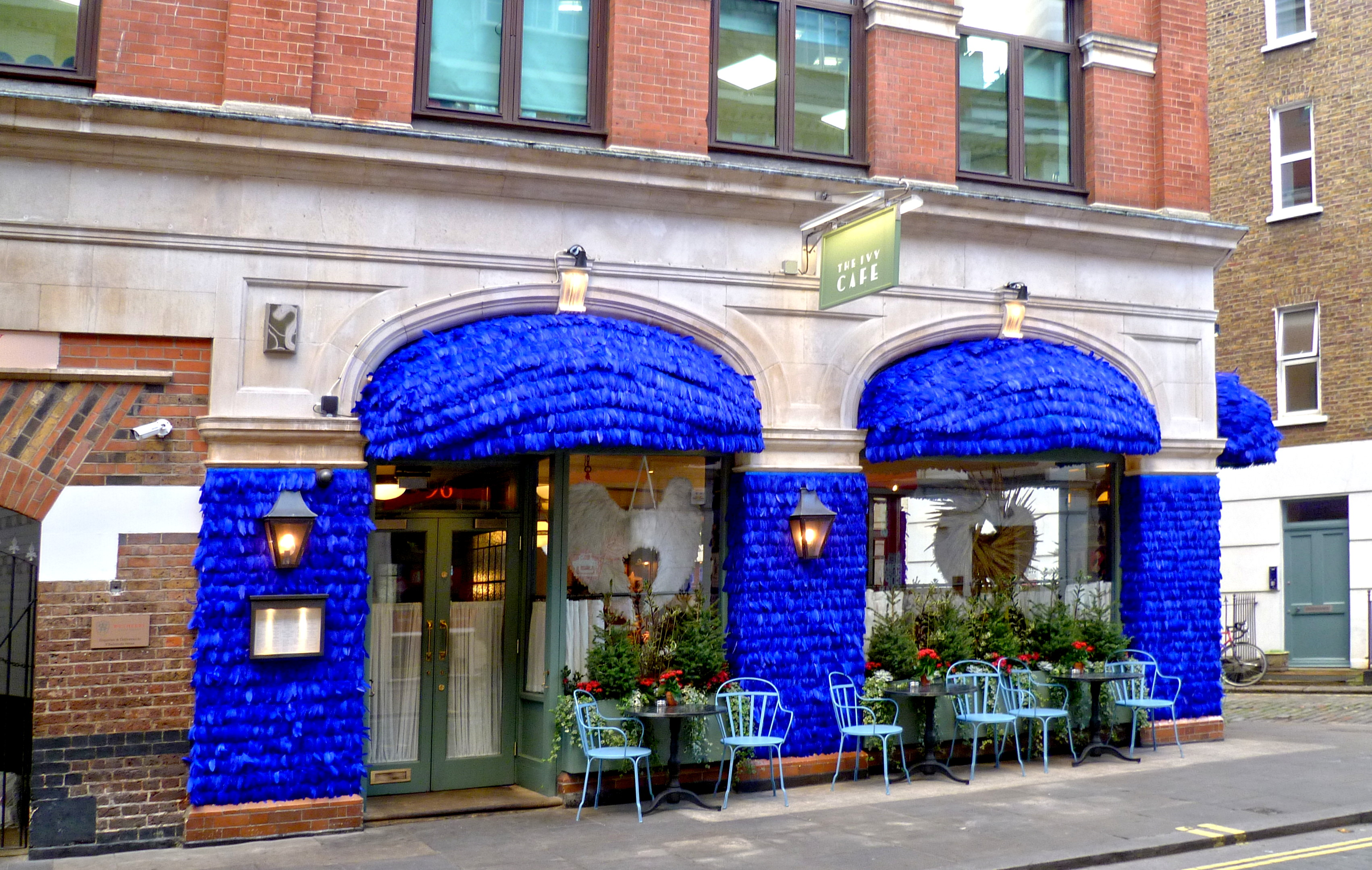
The Ivy Cafe, November 2016
