= James Weir (architect) =

British architect (1845–1905)

James Weir (5 March 1845, in St Pancras – 27 August 1905, in London) was a British Wesleyan Methodist architect who designed mainly for the Wesleyan Methodist Church in London and the south east of England.

Initially articled to the eminent architect George Devey from 1859 till 1864, he remained as an assistant of Devey for a further five years and then became an assistant to Richard Norman Shaw. He set up in independent practice in 1873, was elected an Associate of the Royal Institute of British Architects in 1874, and a Fellow in 1882. After living initially in the St Pancras area of London, he moved to the London suburb of Clapham where he remained for the rest of his life.

At the start of his independent career in 1873, Weir, aged 28, obtained a commission through a limited competition to design a new Wesleyan Church at Clapham to accommodate 1,050. Following this successful project he went on to design a further 28 chapels in London and South East England. Of his chapels 16 remain, though some now have different uses. Those at Hinde Street in Marylebone (1887), Beckenham (1887), Sevenoaks (1904) and Tenterden (1885) might be said to be the ones that have been least altered. Most chapels utilised the Gothic style, but a few, in particular Weir's most accomplished chapel, Hinde Street Methodist Church, were in classical style.

Towards the end of his life Weir designed two Central Halls, Victoria Hall in Deptford (1903) and Stepney (completed 1907).

Weir's chapel output could have been greater had not commercial interests governed his career so strongly from 1890 onwards. For many years he acted as architect to the Victoria Chambers Company in Westminster (where his professional offices were situated) and to the Westinghouse Brake Company which had set up in Kings Cross, the area where Weir was brought up.

After his death, the firm of Weir, Burrows and Weir, which he had formed in January 1905, carried on in business. His partner William Weir was James' nephew and Fred Burrows had been his manager.
