= Thayer Street, London =

Street in Marylebone, London

Coordinates: 51°31′4.91″N 0°9′5.35″W

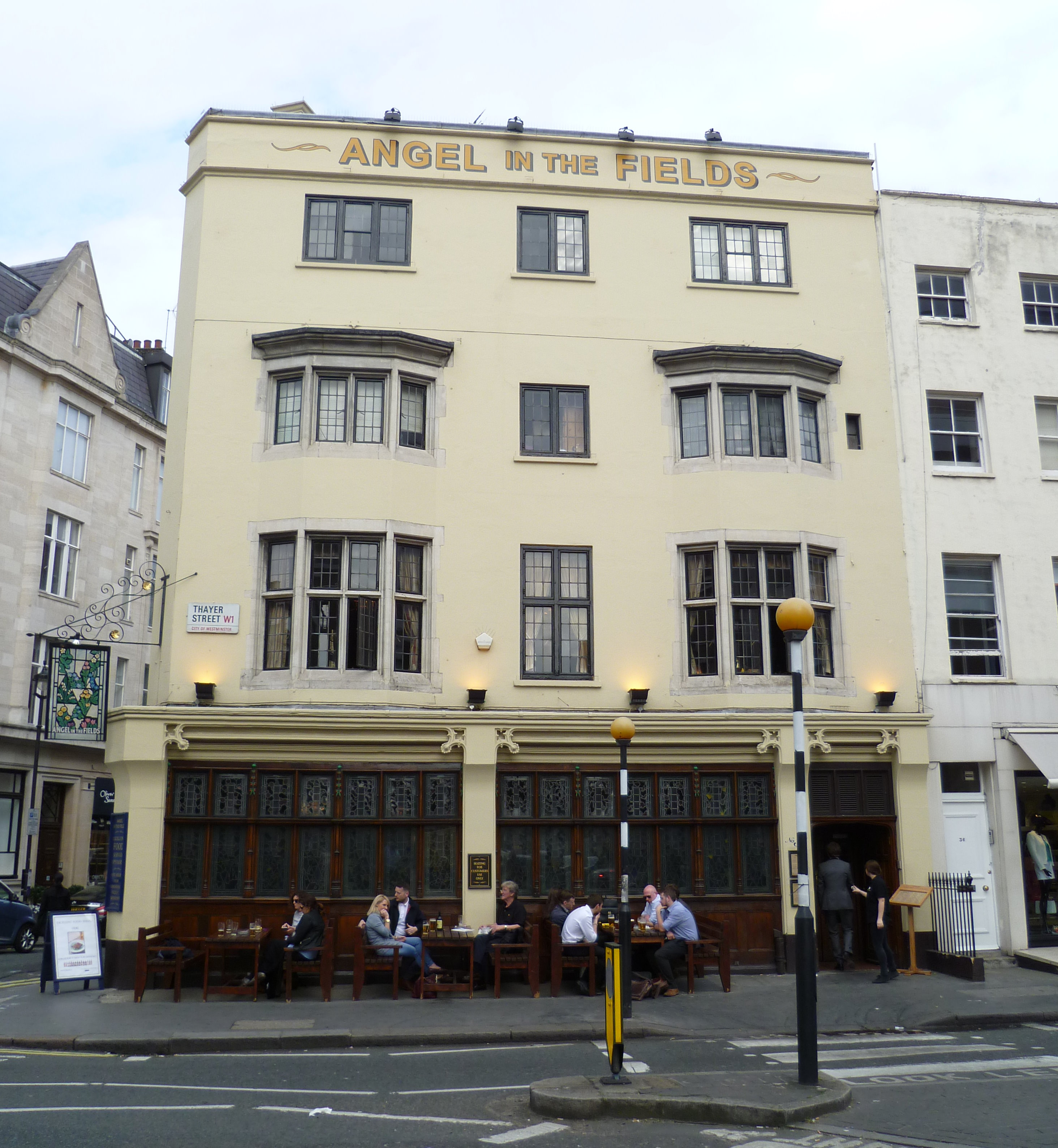
The Angel in the Fields public house, Thayer Street

Thayer Street is a street in the Marylebone district of the City of Westminster, London, that contains four listed buildings.

== Location ==
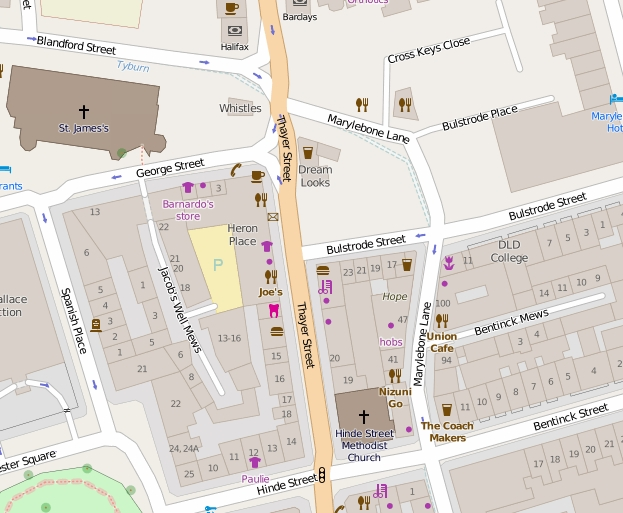
The immediate vicinity of Thayer Street

Thayer Street runs from the junction of Marylebone High Street, Blandford Street and Marylebone Lane in the north to the junction of Hinde Street, Mandeville Place and Bentinck Street in the south. It is joined by George Street on its western side and Bulstrode Street on its eastern side.

== History ==
In 1936, the London County Council tried to rename the street Marylebone High Street, along with Mandeville Place and James Street so that the whole north–south route from Oxford Street to Marylebone Road would have the same name. The proposal was opposed by the shopkeepers and small traders in the street who worried about the cost of the change, possible customer confusion, and the association with Marylebone Road rather than the posher Oxford Street they were nearer. The occupants of Mandeville Place felt that they did not want to lose the higher class associations of the street in order to be associated with shopkeepers. The proposal did not go ahead.

== Buildings ==
Thayer Street is mainly made up of older terraced houses with small shops at ground level. Heron Place is a 1960s mixed use building on the western side that was renovated in 2013/14.

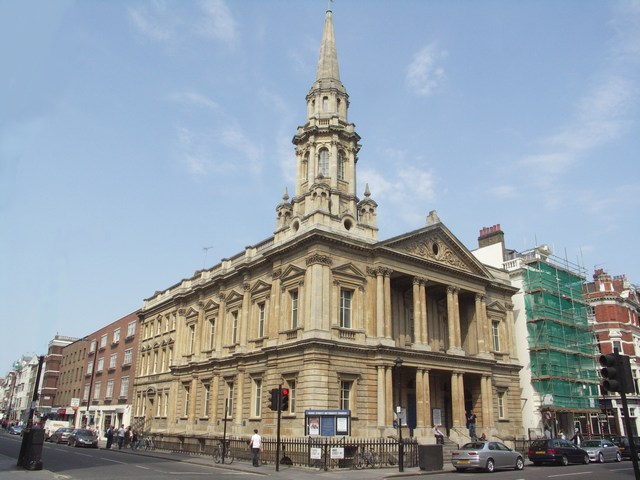
Hinde Street Methodist Church on the corner of Thayer Street and Hinde Street

The West London Mission of the Methodist Church is a grade II listed building with Historic England at number 19 on the eastern side. It was rebuilt in 1980 behind the original facade. Next door is the side elevation of Hinde Street Methodist Church, built 1807–10, and rebuilt in the 1880s.

Numbers 33-35 Thayer Street are also grade II listed buildings.
