= Durrant's Hotel =

Historical hotel in London

Coordinates: 51.5180°N 0.1532°W

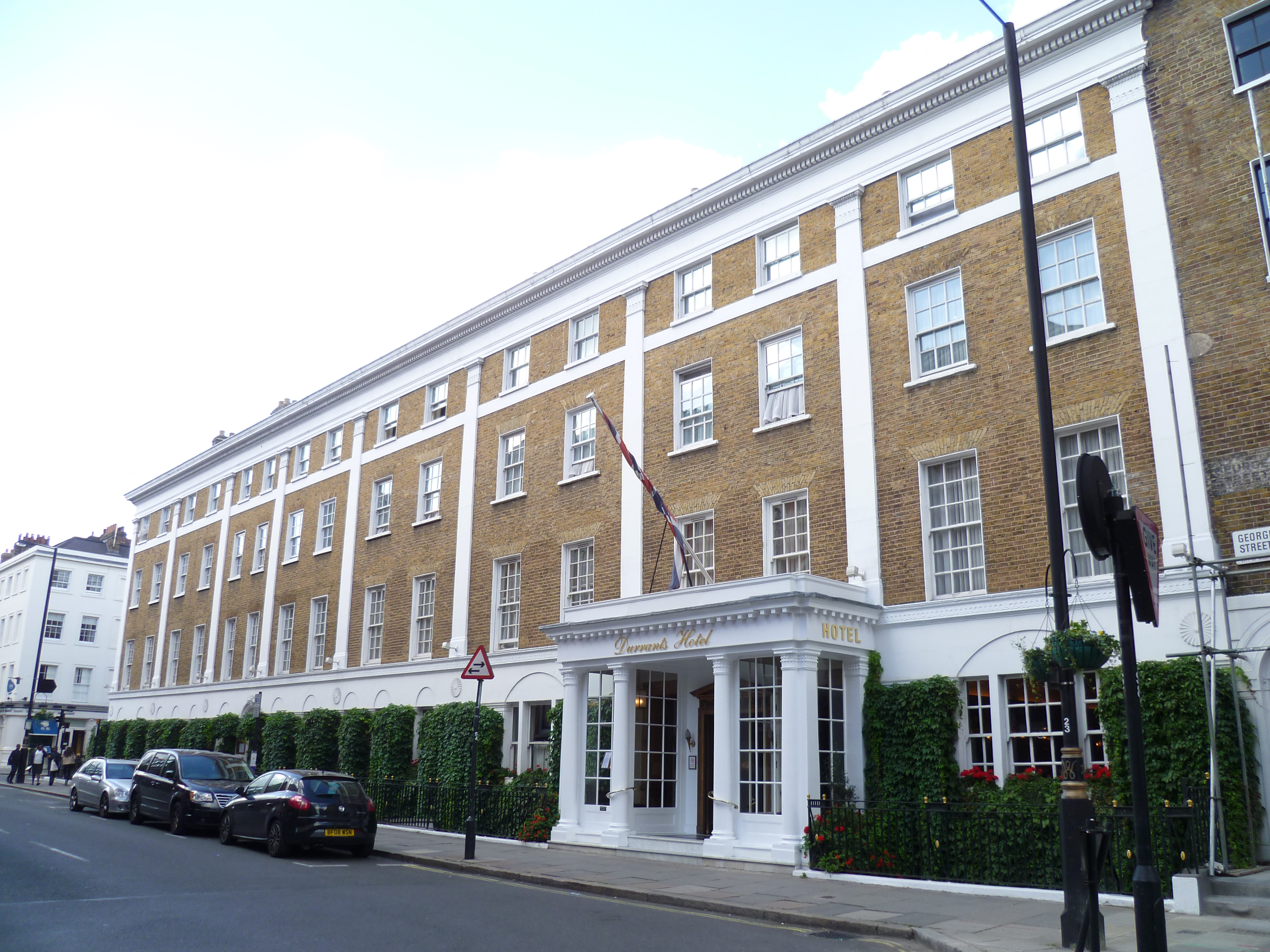
Durrant's Hotel, 2016

Durrant's Hotel is located at 26-32 George Street, in the central London district of Marylebone, England. Established in 1789, the hotel has been owned by the Miller family since 1921 and is one of the last remaining privately owned hotels in London. The building has 92 rooms, and several houses have been incorporated into the building's structure. It is located opposite the Wallace Collection art galleries.

The building was converted to a hotel in the early 19th-century from a terrace of town houses built between 1780-1800. It has been listed Grade II on the National Heritage List for England since December 1987.
