= George Street, Marylebone =

Street in Central London

Coordinates: 51.5178°N 0.15632°W

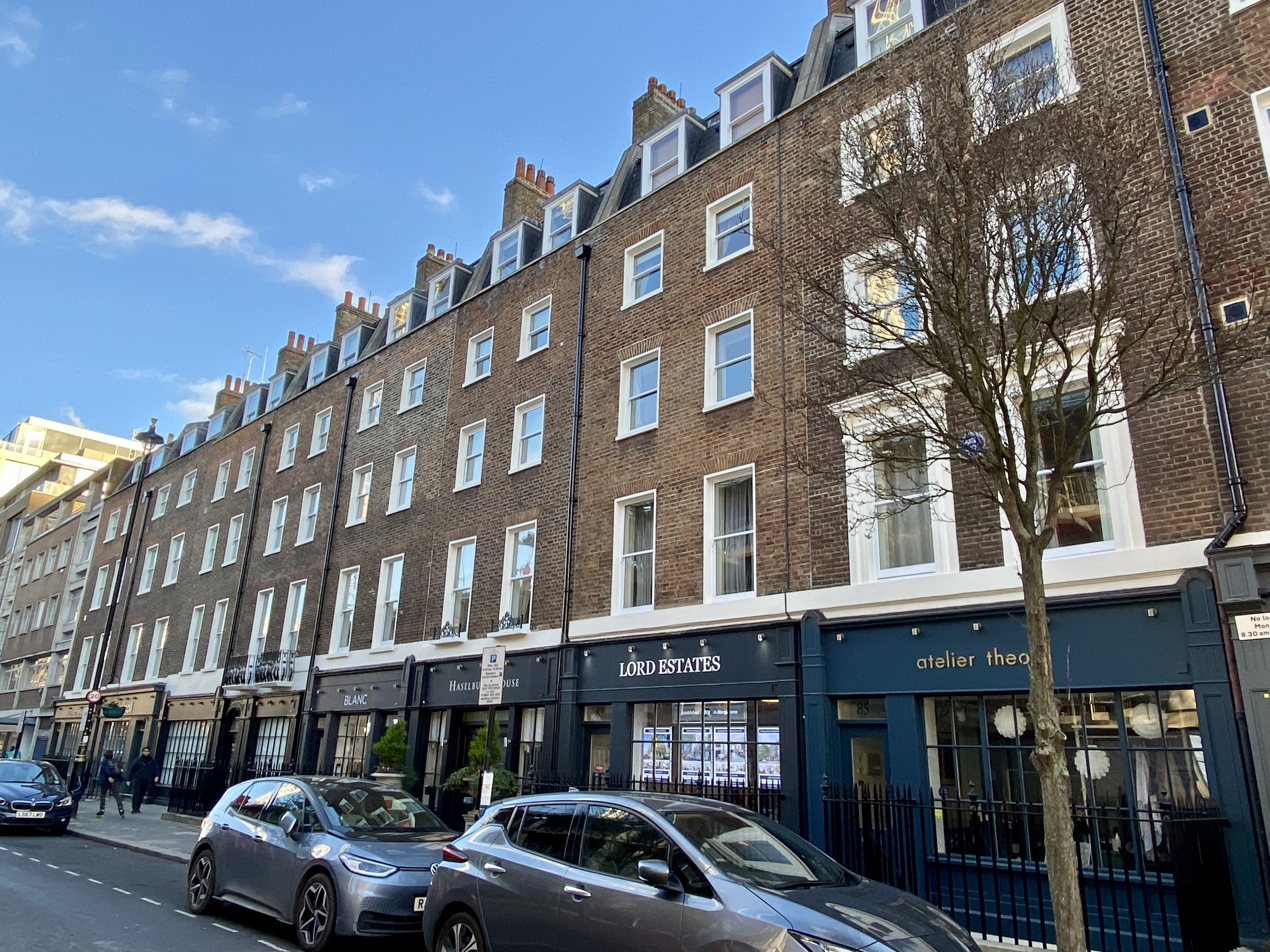
George Street.

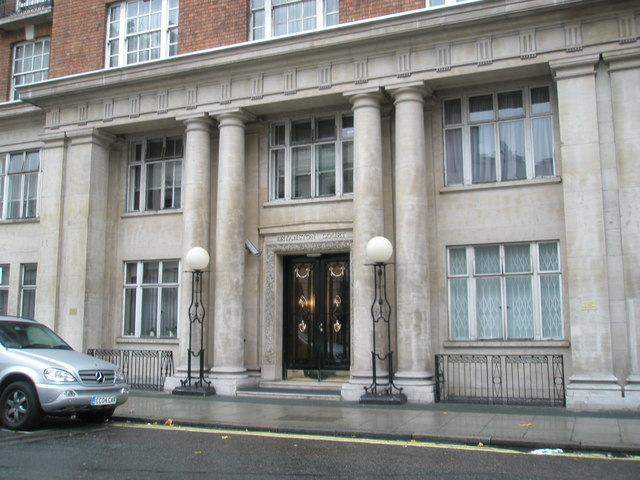
Bryanston Court

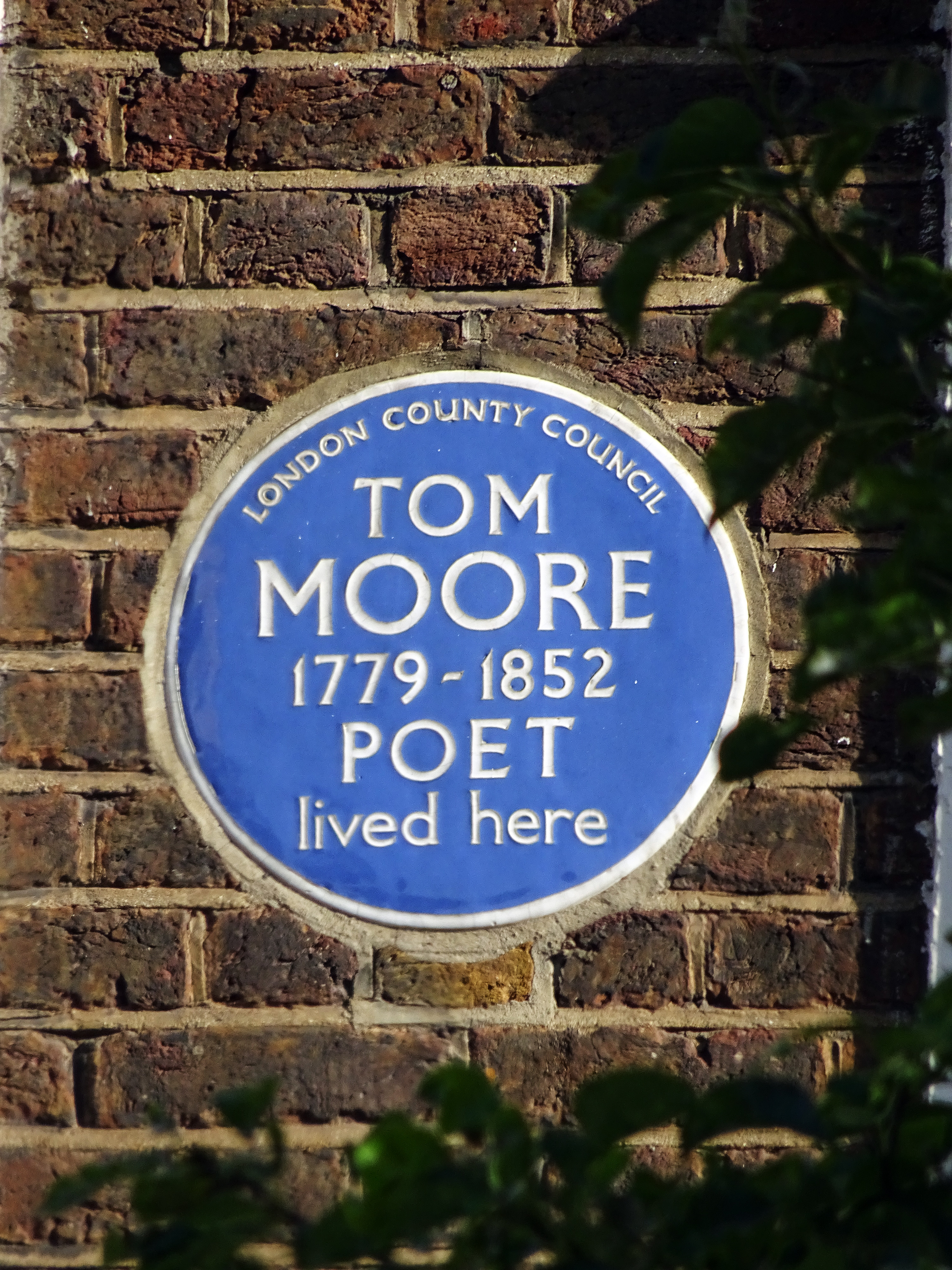
Blue plaque commemorating the Irish writer Thomas Moore.

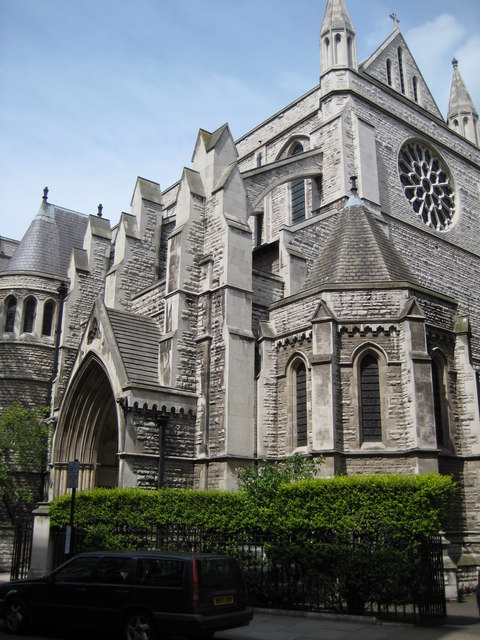
The neo-Gothic St James's Church.

George Street is a street in Marylebone in Central London, England. Located in the City of Westminster, it runs east from Edgware Road until it reaches Marylebone High Street at its junction with Thayer Street. It crosses a number of streets including Seymour Place, Gloucester Place, Manchester Street and Baker Street.

It is named after George III who was on the throne when the street was first laid out in the eighteenth century. The area is part of the old Portman Estate which was redeveloped into a grid of streets for affluent housing. Part of the street west of Gloucester Place was once known as Upper George Street, but this was renamed by Marylebone Council.

In 1810 the Hindoostane Coffee House was established in the street by Dean Mahomed. The Catholic Gothic St James's Church was opened in 1890. The street also contains Durrants Hotel, opposite the rear of Hertford House, the home of the Wallace Collection.

The Irish writer Thomas Moore lived in the street and a blue plaque now commemorates him. At the southern end of Bryanston Square is a memorial fountain to William Pitt Byrne, editor of Morning Post newspaper. Marie Belloc Lowndes, author of The Lodger, was born in the street in 1868. In the 1930s Wallis Simpson lived in an apartment in Bryanston Court, where her future husband Edward, Prince of Wales used to call on her.

== Bibliography ==
- Bebbington, Gillian. London Street Names. Batsford, 1972.
- Cherry, Bridget & Pevsner, Nikolaus. London 3: North West. Yale University Press, 2002.
- Pasternak, Anna. The American Duchess: The Real Wallis Simpson. Simon and Schuster, 2020.
- Pevsner, Nikolaus. The Buildings of England: London (except the cities of London and Westminster). Penguin Books, 1952.
- Riddaway, Mark & Upsall, Carl. Marylebone Lives: Rogues, romantics and rebels – character studies of locals since the eighteenth century. Spiramus Press Ltd, 2015.
- Warkentin, Elyssa (ed.) The Lodger by Marie Belloc Lowndes. Cambridge Scholars Publishing, 2015.
