= Hinde Street Methodist Church =

Coordinates: 51.5171°N 0.1511°W

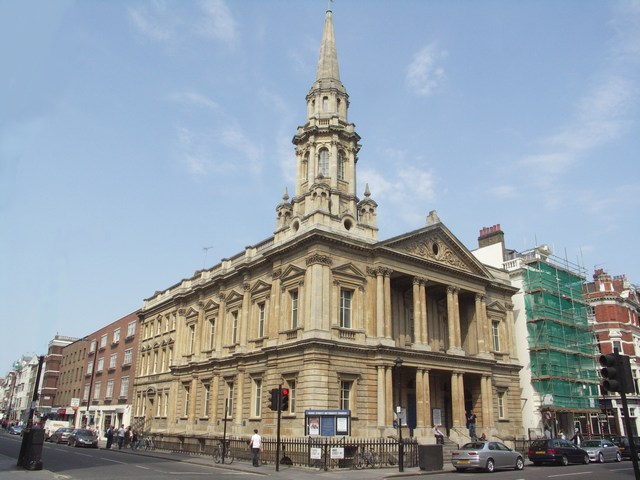
Hinde Street Methodist Church on the corner of Thayer Street and Hinde Street

Hinde Street Methodist Church in Hinde Street, Marylebone, London, is Grade II listed with Historic England. It was built 1807-10 and rebuilt in the 1880s.

== History ==
The First Chapel of 1810

Methodists had a presence in London's West End from the earliest days of the Methodist movement. A leased chapel in West Street (which can still be seen, just off Cambridge Circus) was used from 1743, and John and Charles Wesley themselves preached there. From 1761, or earlier, there was also a centre in Mayfair, the western geographical extremity of London at that time. From 1785 to 1801 a preaching room in Davies Street was leased, after which, with membership growing rapidly, the Society took over and rebuilt a nearby chapel in Chandler Street (now Weighhouse Street).

In 1808 land close by in Marylebone was acquired to build an even larger chapel, on part of the site now occupied by the present Hinde Street building. It was then a swampy piece of ground by the Tyburn stream which ran down the present route of Marylebone Lane. The architect, Rev. William Jenkins, was one of Wesley’s itinerant preachers who combined preaching with chapel design. The chapel, opened in 1810, held around 900, had two galleries and acquired the nickname ‘The Dutch Oven’ because of its shape.

Charles Wesley had lived nearby in Chesterfield Street, Marylebone (now Wheatley Street), and a son and daughter were members of class in the new chapel.

Hinde Street's West End location attracted the foremost preachers in Methodism, and its pulpit gained a formidable reputation. Membership peaked at 1,100 in 1844 at a time of intense evangelism.

The Sunday School

One of the church's principal areas of service to the local community was the Sunday School. Established when the first chapel was built in 1810, it was the first Sunday School in Marylebone and attracted 758 members by 1817, with some 500 children attending in the basement schoolroom on a typical Sunday. In its early days it provided invaluable instruction in reading and writing especially for the poorer children of the neighbourhood, prior to the provision of universal state education.

The Present (1887) Chapel

The old chapel was demolished and the present chapel, built to the designs of James Weir, a Wesleyan architect, opened on 29 September 1887. It has a classical frontage, a high spire and an interior that remains largely unaltered save for removal of the original downstairs pews. It is regarded as Weir’s finest building and is listed, Grade 2. The semi-circular gallery and high central pulpit are typical of Methodist preaching chapels of its time. The east window (1929) is by Francis Spear and the organ is basically the original 1864 instrument by Bishop and Sons, rebuilt in 1910 and 1983.

Today the minister conducts the service from the lower dais to be closer to the congregation. To open up the entrance lobby and make it more visible from the street, a new entrance with glass doors was built in 2014 to replace the more constrictive original space.

A Changing Congregation

As the local population of the West End changed, families tended to move further out and the local neighbourhood was increasingly characterised by an often somewhat transient young adult population. In the twentieth century this became a defining feature of the Hinde Street constituency, and the church attracted large numbers of students and young people in the early stages of their working life. In 1945 the church became the focal point for the University of London Methodist Society, which peaked at around 700 members in the 1950s and existed for 50 years. The church retains many young adult members, some of whom live in two residential communities maintained by Hinde Street.

The Church and the West London Mission

Up to the 1970s the three great Methodist preaching centres in Central London were Central Hall Westminster, Kingsway Hall in Holborn (where Donald Soper was based as the superintendent of the West London Mission), and Hinde Street Church. In 1972 the lease of Kingsway Hall was sold and plans were made for the West London Mission to move to Hinde Street. A partial redevelopment of the Hinde Street site from 1980 (when the Kingsway congregation moved to Hinde Street) introduced new office accommodation for the Mission from which its extensive programme of social work could be run. The West London Mission now has its headquarters at 19 Thayer Street, linked to the Hinde Street chapel, and its social work programme continues actively today with projects in different parts of London, sustained by the worshipping community at Hinde Street.

== The church today ==
The church provides three services of worship on Sundays (at 9.30am, 11am and 6.30pm). It adheres to an open, questioning and socially aware Christianity concerned with the perennial task: ‘to serve the present age’, as once described by Charles Wesley.

King's Cross church with its flourishing Chinese congregation, joined Hinde Street and the West London Mission in the Circuit in 2000.

The church supports two Christian communities attached to it, and a programme of work with students and young adults. It runs a weekly drop-in for homeless people, a Winter Night Shelter, a social and study group and a lunch hour meditation, and is part of the West London Mission, running seven social work projects working with the homeless and marginalised.

It became, in 2015, a member of the Inclusive Church movement. Its building is used during weekdays by 69 different 12-step groups, with around 800 people coming for support and spiritual guidance every week.
