= York Street, Marylebone =

Street in Central London, England

Coordinates: 51.520°N 0.161°W

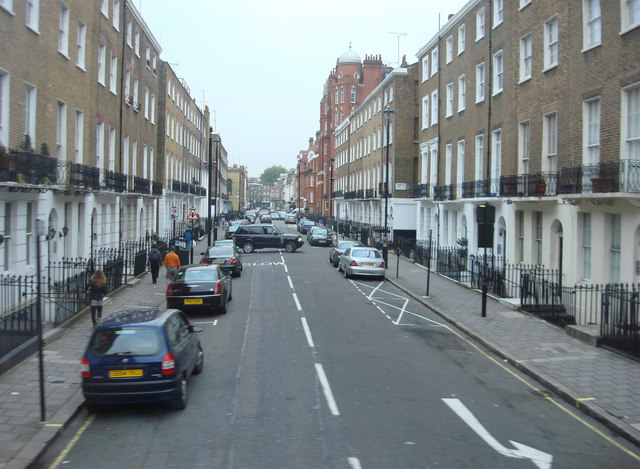
Looking west down York Street.

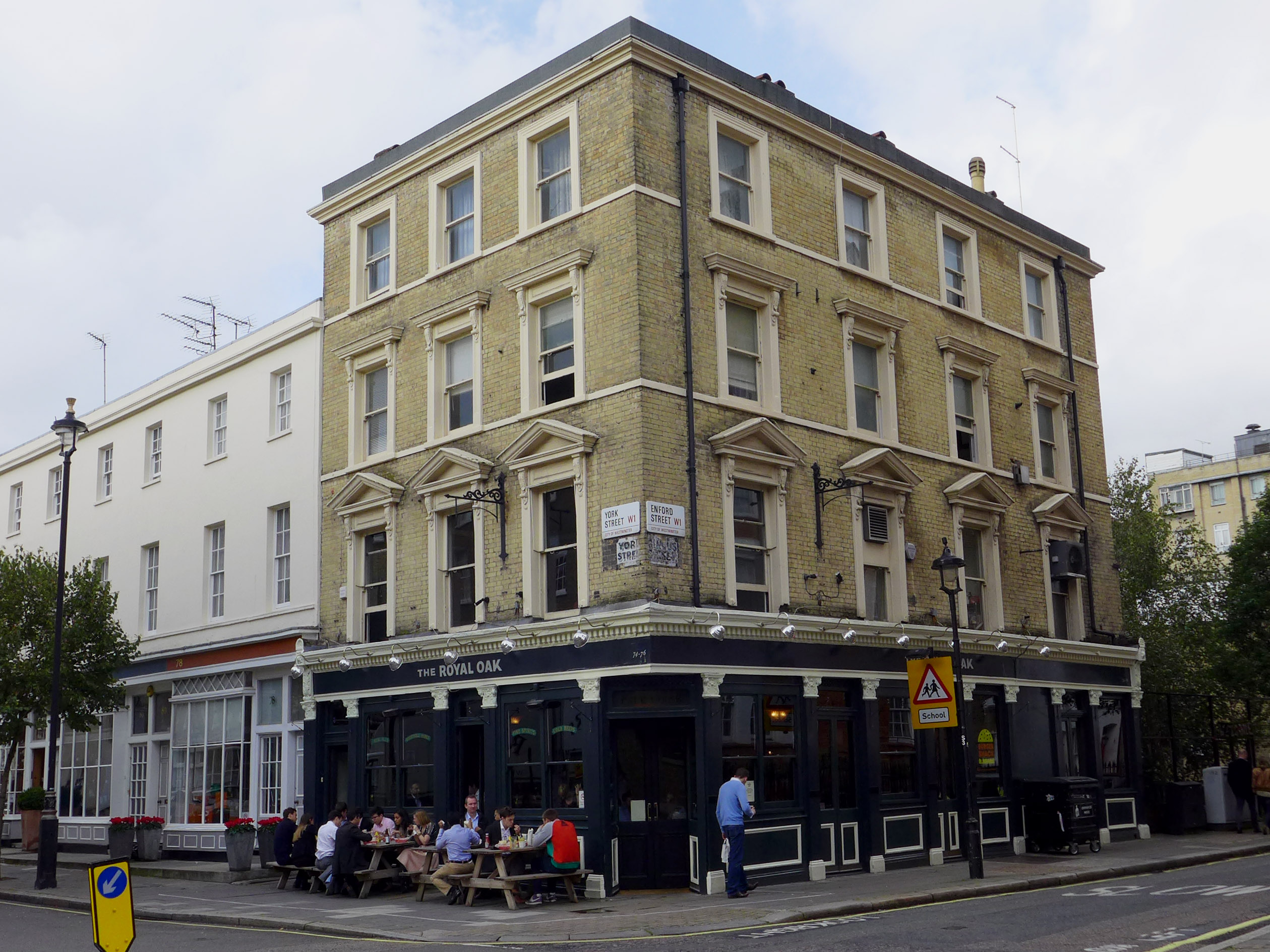
The Royal Oak pub.

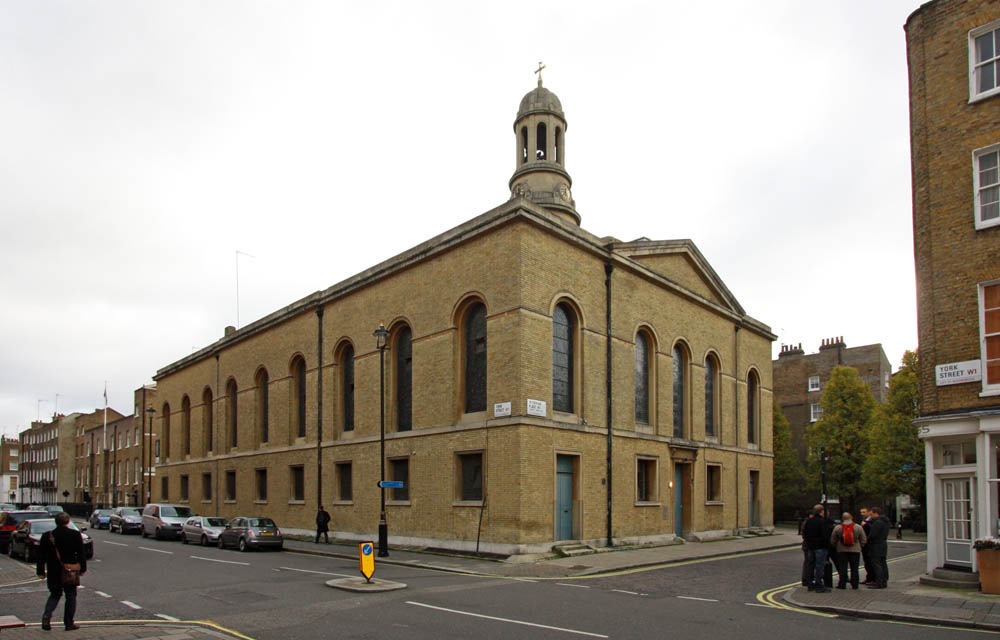
The York Street side of St Mary's Church.

York Street is a street in Marylebone in Central London. Located in the City of Westminster, it runs west from Baker Street in a straight line until it begins curving when it becomes Harcourt Street towards the Old Marylebone Road. It crosses a number of streets including Seymour Place, Upper Montagu Street and Gloucester Place.

It was laid out in the eighteenth century as part of the grid-like pattern of the area, developed from the Portman Estate as affluent housing. It is named after Frederick, Duke of York, the son of George III and brother of George IV and William IV. A number of the buildings retain their original Georgian design. Among prominent residents of the street is the Victorian painter George Richmond and the writers Frances Milton Trollope and her sons Thomas and Anthony Trollope. The northern, rear side of the neoclassical St Mary's Church, designed by Robert Smirke and built from 1823 to 1824, faces onto York Street.

== Bibliography ==
- Bebbington, Gillian. London Street Names. Batsford, 1972.
- Cherry, Bridget & Pevsner, Nikolaus. London 3: North West. Yale University Press, 2002.
- Dargan, Pat. Georgian London: The West End. Amberley Publishing Limited, 2012.
- Mackenzie, Gordon. Marylebone: Great City North of Oxford Street. Macmillan, 1972.
- Shrimpton, Nicholas (ed.) Anthony Trollope: An Autobiography: and Other Writings. OUP Oxford, 2014.
