= St Mary's, Bryanston Square =

Church in Marylebone, London, England

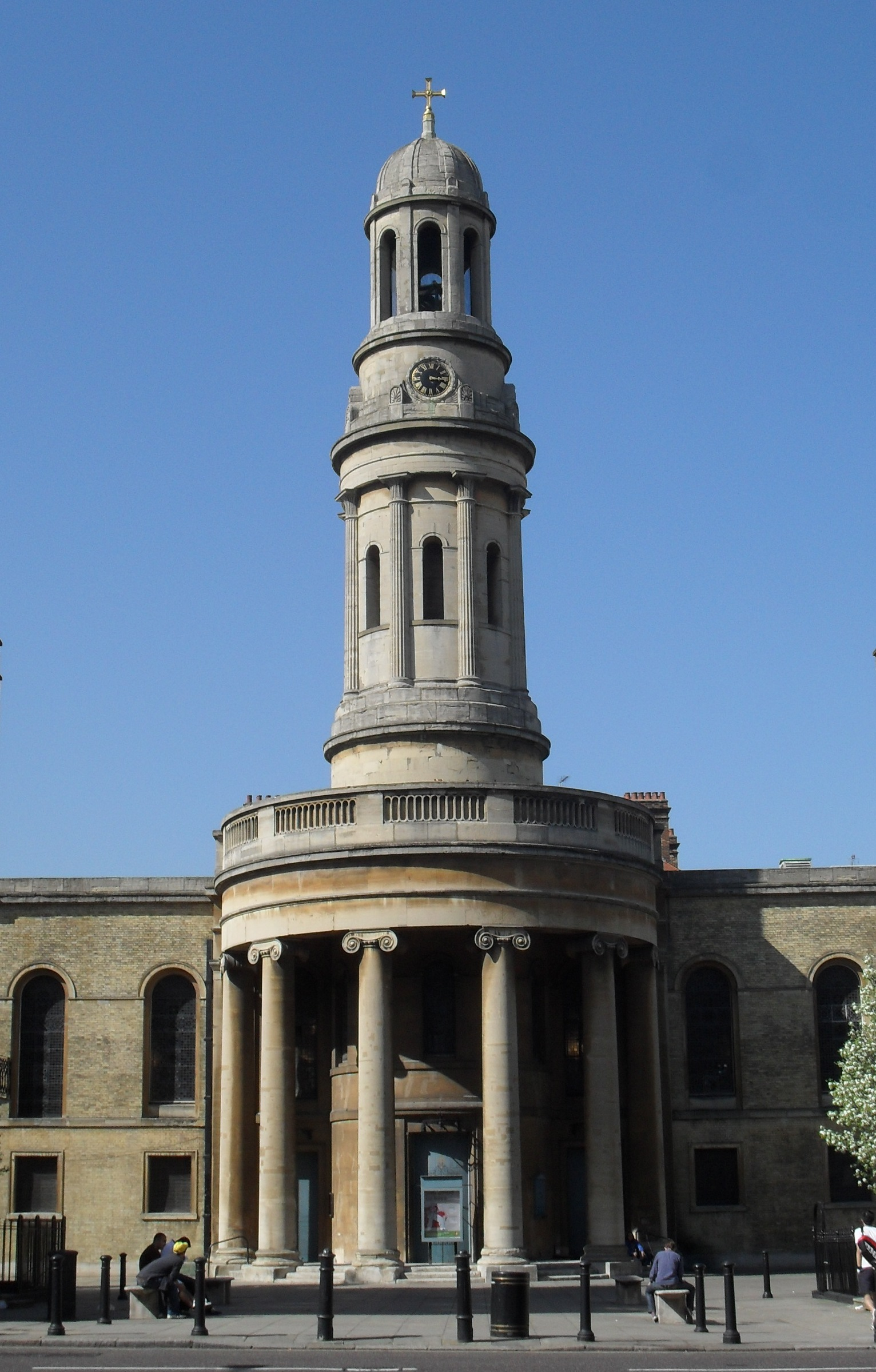

- Location within City of Westminster
- 51°31′11″N 0°9′43″W
- Location: Wyndham Place, Bryanston Square, London W1H 1PQ
- Country: England
- Denomination: Church of England
- Churchmanship: Charismatic evangelical
- Website: stmaryslondon.com

History
- Status: Parish church

Architecture
- Functional status: Active
- Architect: Robert Smirke
- Groundbreaking: 1823
- Completed: 1824
- Construction cost: £19,955

Administration
- Diocese: London
- Archdeaconry: Charing Cross
- Parish: St Mary, Bryanston Square with St Mark, Marylebone

Clergy
- Rector: The Revd John Peters

Listed Building – Grade I
- Official name: Church of St Mary
- Designated: 10 September 1954
- Reference no.: 1224993

St Mary's, Bryanston Square, is a Church of England church dedicated to the Virgin Mary on Wyndham Place, Bryanston Square, London. A related Church of England primary school which was founded next to it bears the same name.

== History ==
St Mary's, Bryanston Square was built as one of the Commissioners' churches in 1823–1824 and was designed by Robert Smirke to seal the vista from the lower end of Bryanston Square. It is a brick building, with a rounded stone portico, round tower and small dome, topped by cross. It is listed in the top protective and recognition category, grade I. The church cost £19,955 (equivalent to £1,890,000 in 2025), towards which the Church Building Commission gave a grant of £14,955. The northern side faces onto York Street.

Charles John Gardiner, 1st Earl of Blessington, and Margaret Farmer were married in the church. Thomas Frognall Dibdin (c.1823 – 1847) was a rector, and Samuel Augustus Barnett was introduced to his future wife Henrietta during his curacy there (1867–68).

== Modern era ==
The church is known colloquially as "St Mary's Church London", since it is the most central Anglican church named St Mary's in inner London, and is known to be an active element of the evangelical wing of the Church of England.

The current congregation led by Rev'd John Peters began meeting in the building in 2002, having received allocation of the building from the Bishop of London. Most of the starting congregation moved from St Paul's Onslow Square, having met there under the name St Paul's Anglican Fellowship following reorganisation at Holy Trinity Brompton & St Paul's Onslow Square.

== List of rectors ==
- Thomas Frognall Dibdin (1824–1847)
- John Hampden Gurney (1847–1862)
- Charles Dallas Marston (1862–1866)
- The Hon. William Henry Freemantle (1866–1883)
- The Hon. James Wentworth Leigh (1883–1894)
- Henry Russell Wakefield (1894–1910)
- Launcelot Jefferson Percival (1910–1926)
- Albert Ernest Nicholass Simms (1926–1946)
- Arthur Donal Browne (1946–1962)
- Martin Gloster Sullivan (1962–1964)
- Victor Tucker Harvey (1964–1982)
- Iain MacGregor MacKenzie (1982–1989)
- David Evans (1990–1999)
- John Peters (2000–present)

== Services ==
The church runs two services on a Sunday: an informal 11am service, with groups for children and youth, and an informal 5:30pm service for all ages, but catered slightly towards young professionals.

== Groups and courses ==
The church runs several midweek groups and courses, aimed at a wide variation of people.

=== Life Course ===
The Life Course is an eight week course run three times annually, which aims to enable participants to explore the various meanings assigned to life. The aim of the course is to provide an open platform to discuss viewpoints and explore more than would be typically catered for in a church service or outreach course. As such, it does not require any particular belief or faith. Those who would describe themselves as agnostic or atheist are just as welcome as those of the Christian faith as well as other faiths: in the past, members of the Sunday Assembly have undertaken the course.

Participants meet downstairs in the church hall for dinner, following which an introductory presentation is made, aiming to stimulate discussion in smaller groups. Over the course, themes include: "What meaning do we give our lives?", "Where do people look for meaning?", "What evidence is there that true meaning can be found?" and "What difference does true meaning make?" alongside others. The course also includes an optional weekend away.

== Church planting ==
From 2004 to 2017, St Mary's encouraged and participated in church planting, as well as supporting the development of other churches sharing similar values. It planted, or assisted with the development of:

- Mike (staff at St Mary's) and Bex Norris started new services at St Paul's Church, Auckland (2004).
- Jon and Jo Soper (staff at St Mary's) started Exeter Network Church (2005).
- Laura and Antley Fowler (St Mary's staff) planted River City Church, Jacksonville, FL (2005)
- Derek and Beth Harmon (from River City Church with support from St Mary's) planted Ocean City Church, Jacksonville, FL (2010)
- Al and Niki Hardy planted City Church, Charlotte, NC (2007)
- Pete and Bee Hughes (former St Mary's staff) planted KXC, Kings Cross Church (2010)
- Ed Flint (former staff), along with wife Hannah, planted Bread Church, Los Angeles, CA (2017)

== Other activities ==
St Mary's is a long-standing member of the New Wine network of churches, and regularly attends and leads seminar streams at their United summer conferences. Rector John Peters is also responsible for Prayer Ministry at New Wine, and regularly leads training days and conferences around the country for those who wish to pray for people in the power of the Holy Spirit.

== In popular culture ==
The church was used as 'Saint Jude's' in the 2019 feature film Last Christmas.

== The Centre ==
Staff from St Mary's have set up The Centre, an organisation specialising in family and relationships work. The Centre offers several materials and courses aiming to teach practices leading to better relationships and emotional health, including:

- Circle of Security training: weekly sessions helping parents develop more healthy relationships with children alongside teaching parenting strategies. Training courses for Facilitators (typically counselling and health professionals) are also offered at least annually.
- One-off seminars and seminar series: evening seminars presenting advice on particular age groups such as babies, toddlers and teenagers.
- Marriage preparation courses (in association with St Mary's) for engaged as well as long-term couples, to offer tools and advice for ensuring a healthy relationship.
- Hold Me Tight courses (in association with St Mary's), using content developed by Dr Sue Johnson, for married or long-term committed couples to continue developing a healthy marriage.

== See also ==
- List of Commissioners' churches in London
