= Hinde Street =

Street in Marylebone, London

Coordinates: 51°31′0.93″N 0°9′4.68″W

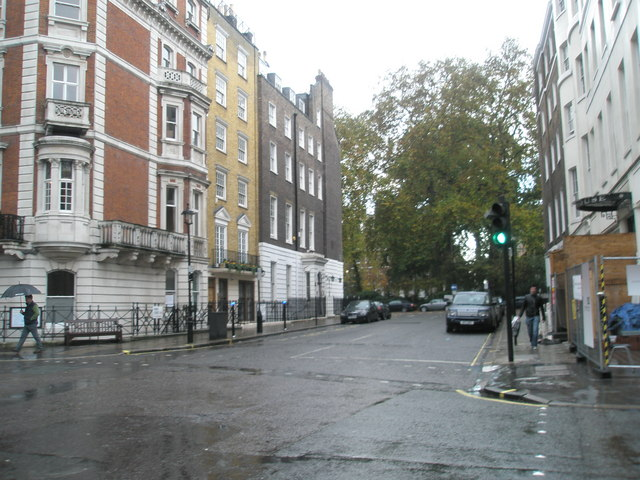
The western end of Hinde Street, looking towards Manchester Square

Hinde Street is a street in the Marylebone district of the City of Westminster, London, that contains the Hinde Street Methodist Church and was home to the novelist Rose Macaulay until her death.

== Location ==
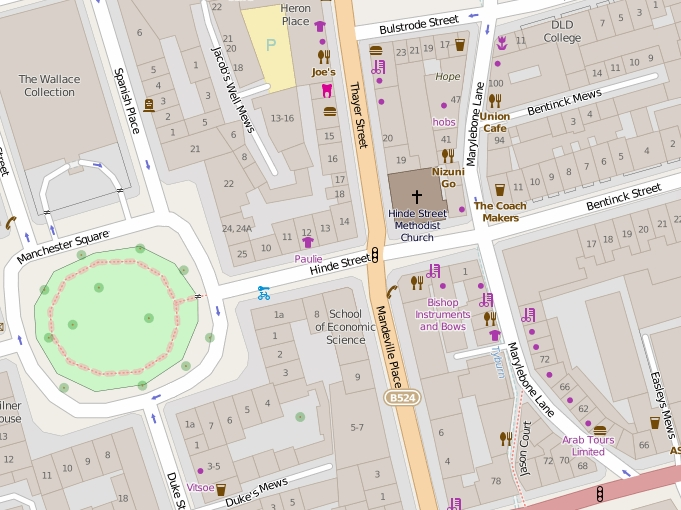
The immediate vicinity of Hinde Street

Hinde Street runs from Manchester Square in the west to the junction of Marylebone Lane and Bentinck Street in the east. Thayer Street joins it mid way on the north side and continues as Mandeville Place on the south side.

== History ==
The street was built from 1777 by Samuel Adams and named after Jacob Hinde who was the son-in-law of the ground landlord Thomas Thayer.

== Buildings ==
The street is home to a number of notable buildings. The Hinde Street Methodist Church, a grade II listed building with Historic England. It was built 1807–10, and rebuilt in the 1880s.

Number 2 on the south side is a Portman Estate development terraced town house built around 1790. The building is grade II listed and occupied on the ground floor by Bishop Instruments and Bows.

Numbers 11 and 12 on the north side between Manchester Square and Thayer Street are also Portman Estate terraced town houses that have shops on the ground floor and flats above. Both are grade II listed.

== Notable inhabitants ==
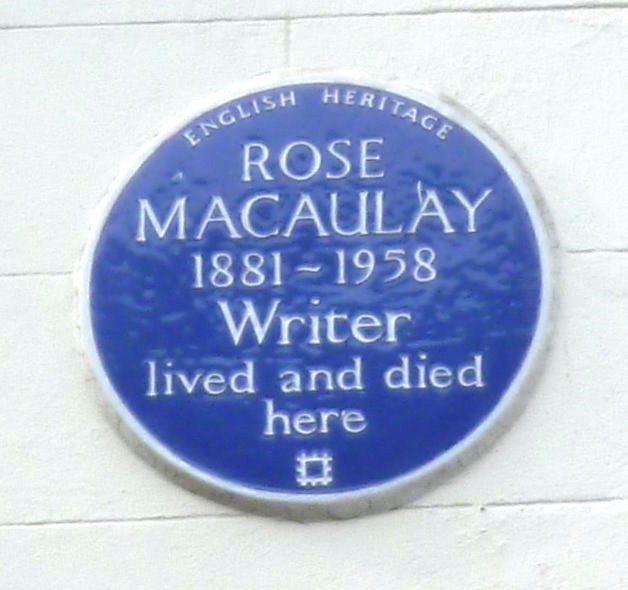
The blue plaque on Hinde House at 11-14 Hinde Street where Rose Macaulay lived and died

- The novelist Rose Macaulay (1881–1958) lived at Hinde House on the north side from 1941 until her death.
- The philosopher Herbert Spencer lodged at number 6 in 1862–63.
- Oscar Beringer's Academy for the Higher Development of Pianoforte Playing was at 12 Hinde Street in 1883.
- In the mid-1880s, writer Edward Healy Thompson lived on Hinde Street, near Manchester Square.
