= Mandeville Place, London =

Street in Marylebone, London

Coordinates: 51.5162°N 0.1510°W

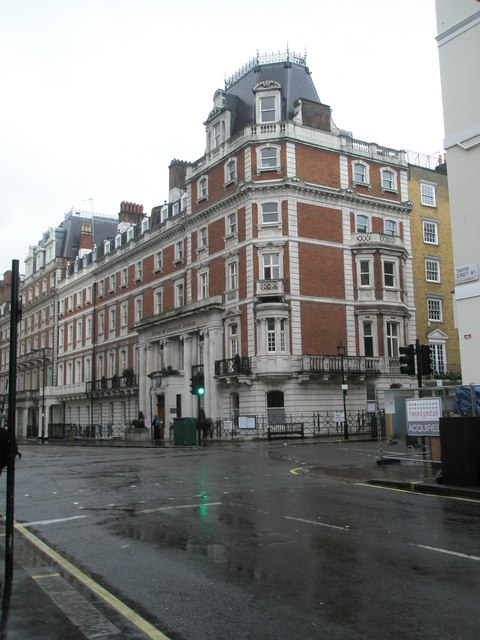
Junction of Hinde Street and Mandeville Place, showing the School of Economic Science on the corner.

Mandeville Place is a street in the Marylebone district of the City of Westminster, London, the buildings in which are notably more impressive than those to the immediate north and south.

== Location ==
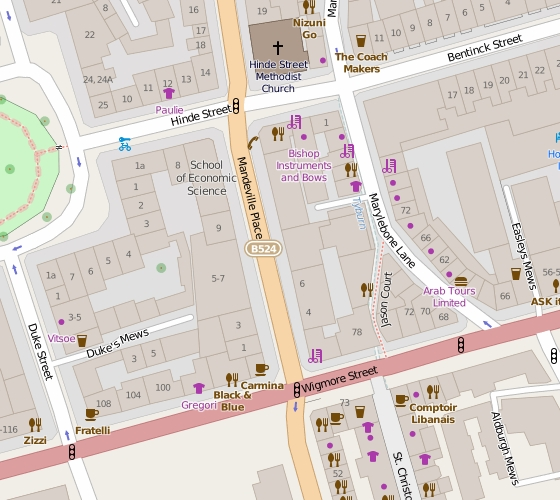
The immediate vicinity of Mandeville Place.

Mandeville Place runs from the junction of Thayer Street and Hinde Street in the north to the junction of Wigmore Street and James Street in the south.

== History ==
Mandeville Place was built around 1777 and named after the Duke of Manchester (Viscount Mandeville) who lived in nearby Manchester Square.

In 1936, the London County Council tried to rename the street Marylebone High Street, along with Thayer Street and James Street so that the whole north–south route from Oxford Street to Marylebone Road would have the same name. The proposal was opposed by the shopkeepers and small traders of the other streets who worried about the cost of the change, possible customer confusion, and the association with Marylebone Road rather than the closer Oxford Street. The occupants of Mandeville Place felt that they did not want to lose the higher class associations of Oxford Street in order to be associated with shopkeepers, and the prestige of the Mandeville Place was particularly useful for members of the medical profession resident in the street. The proposal did not go ahead.

== Buildings ==
The buildings in Mandeville Place are notably more impressive than those of Thayer Street to the north or James Street to the south, possibly reflecting its association with the Duke of Manchester. The buildings are mostly of five or six stories excluding the basement making it suitable for hotels or headquarters buildings, unlike the streets to the north or south which are primarily shopping streets similar to Marylebone High Street.

Indeed, the street is the location of the imposing School of Economic Science and the four star Mandeville Hotel. Other businesses in the street include Claessens International at number 3, a specialist in the branding of alcoholic drinks.

== Inhabitants ==
A plaque at number 12 marks the location where composer Sir Paolo Tosti lived for 20 years until his death in 1916.
