= Bulstrode Street =

Street in City of Westminster, London

Coordinates: 51°31′4.22″N 0°9′0.34″W

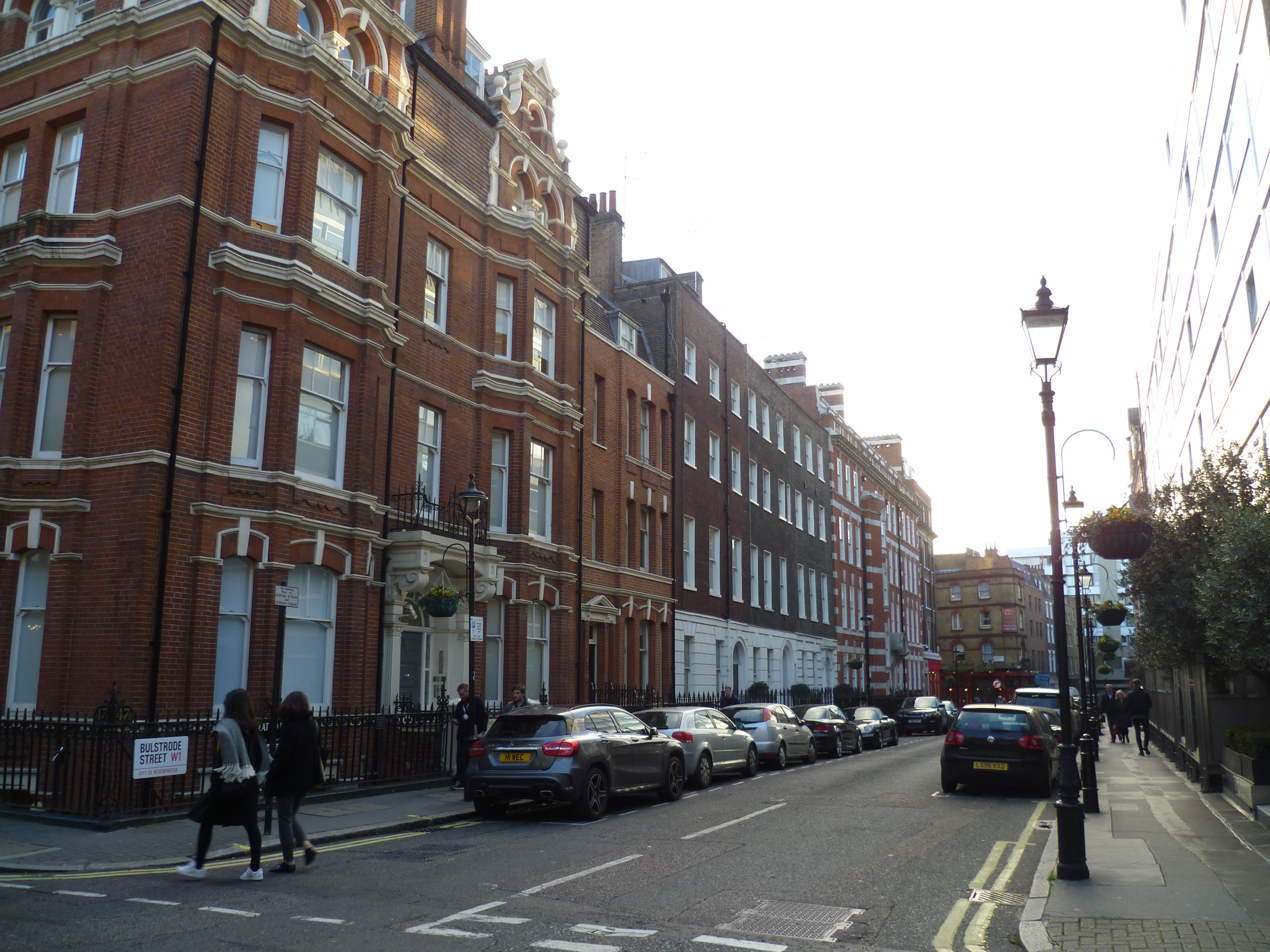
Bulstrode Street looking west

Bulstrode Street is a street in Marylebone in the City of Westminster that runs from Welbeck Street in the east to Thayer Street in the west. It is crossed only by Marylebone Lane.

== History ==
Bulstrode Street was laid out when the Marylebone area was urbanised on a grid pattern in the early 1700s. It is named after Bulstrode Park in Buckinghamshire which was in the ownership of the first Duke of Portland and was the family seat until 1810. The second Duke married Margaret Cavendish, the only child and heiress of Edward Harley of Harley Street fame, and thus acquired the land on which Bulstrode Street stands.

== Architecture ==
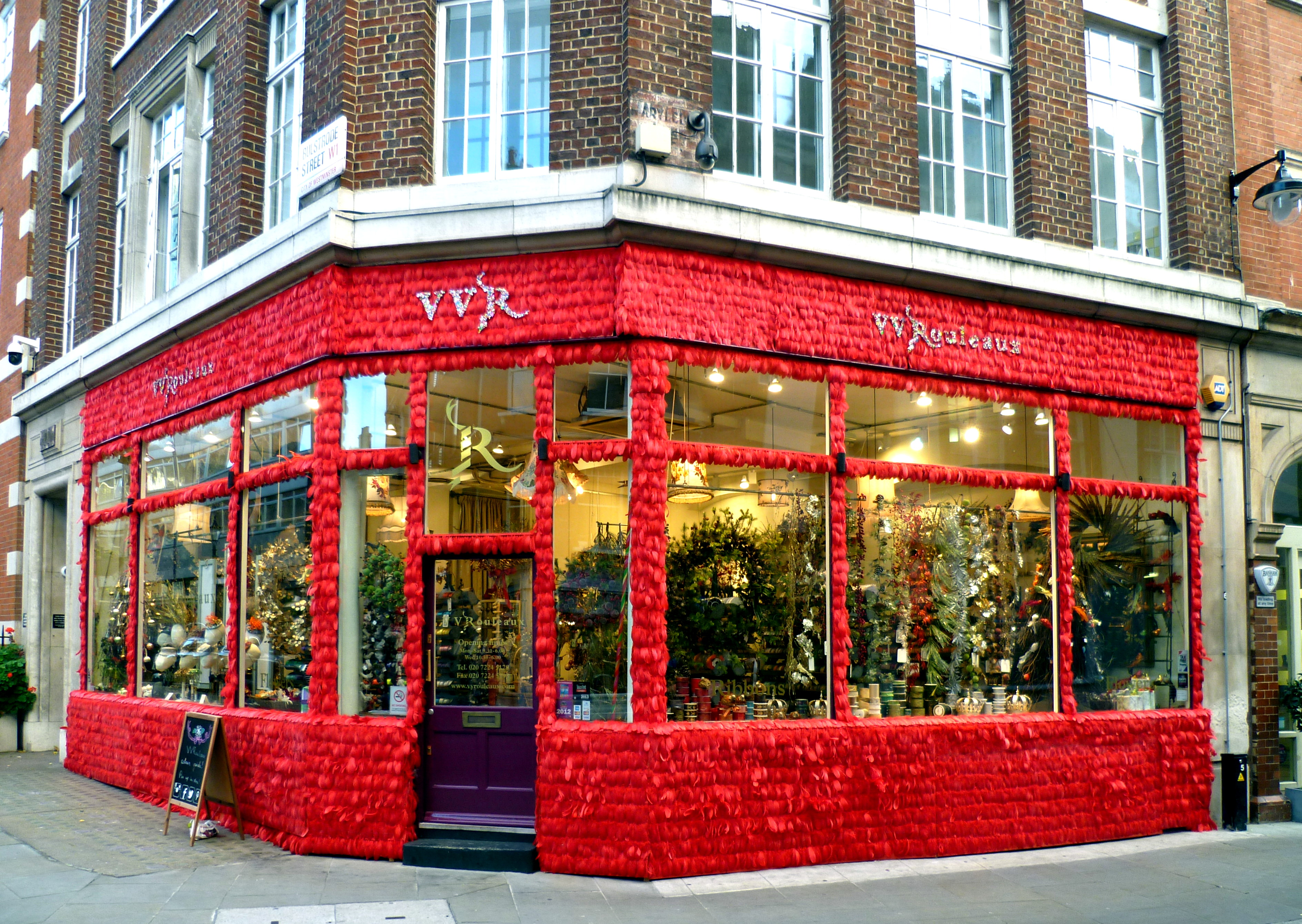
V.V. Rouleaux, November 2016.

The most prominent buildings in Bulstrode Street are the modern Marylebone Hotel on the north side, which has its entrance in Welbeck Street, and The American College on the south side. The three terraced town houses at numbers 3 to 7 on the south side, built around 1780–1800, are grade II listed buildings with Historic England. Adjoining houses number 19 and 21 at the western end on the south side are also grade II listed.

The Golden Eagle, a late Victorian public house, is on the corner with Marylebone Lane on the south side. Opposite are the haberdashers V.V. Rouleaux at number 102.
