= Marylebone High Street =

Shopping street in Central London, England

Coordinates: 51°31′11″N 0°09′06″W

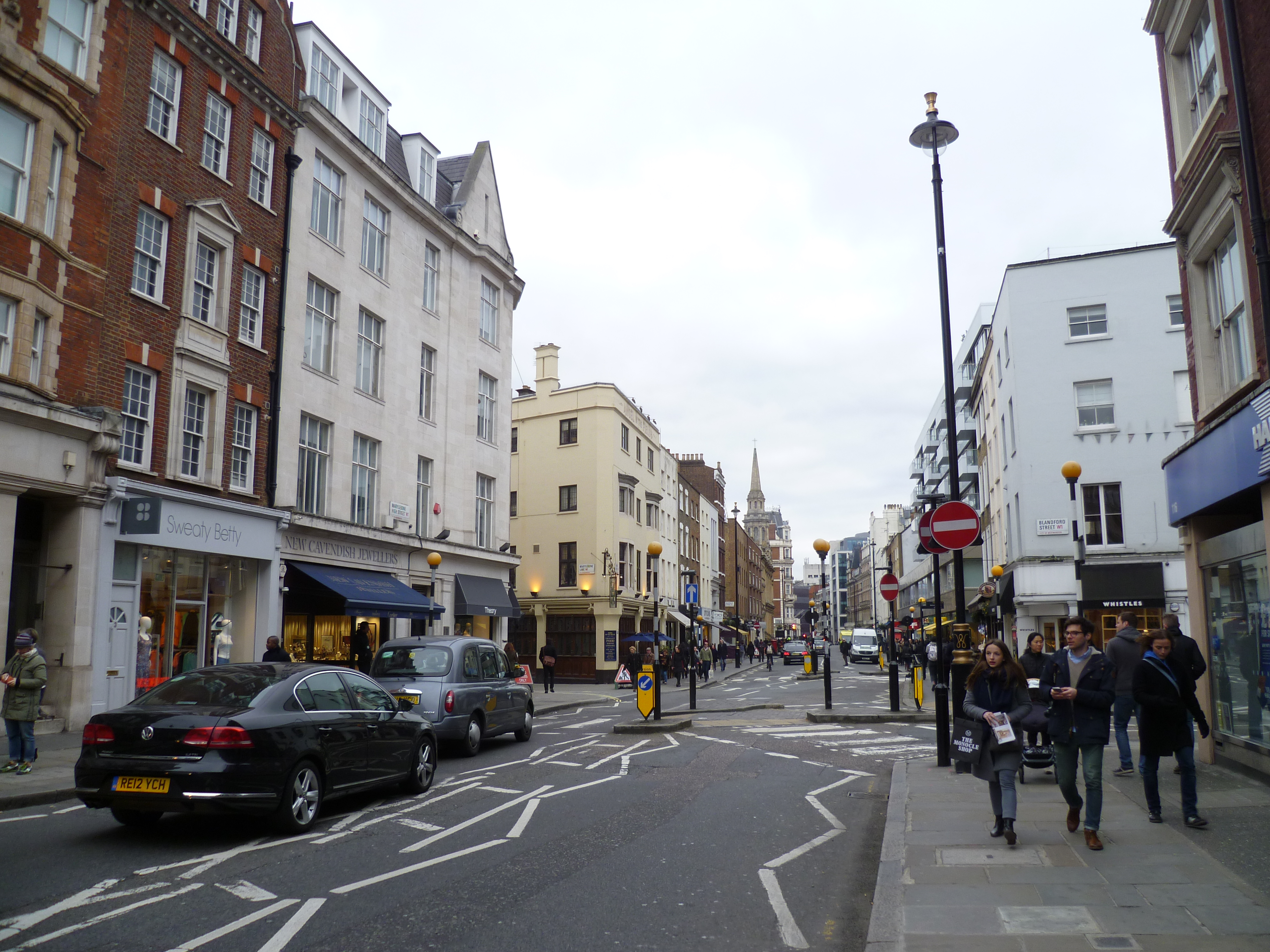
- Looking south down the High Street
- Length: 0.3 mi (0.48 km)
- Location: Marylebone, London, England
- Postal code: W1
- North end: Thayer Street
- To: Marylebone Road

Construction
- Construction start: c.1400

Other
- Known for: Shopping; St Marylebone Parish Church; Manchester Square

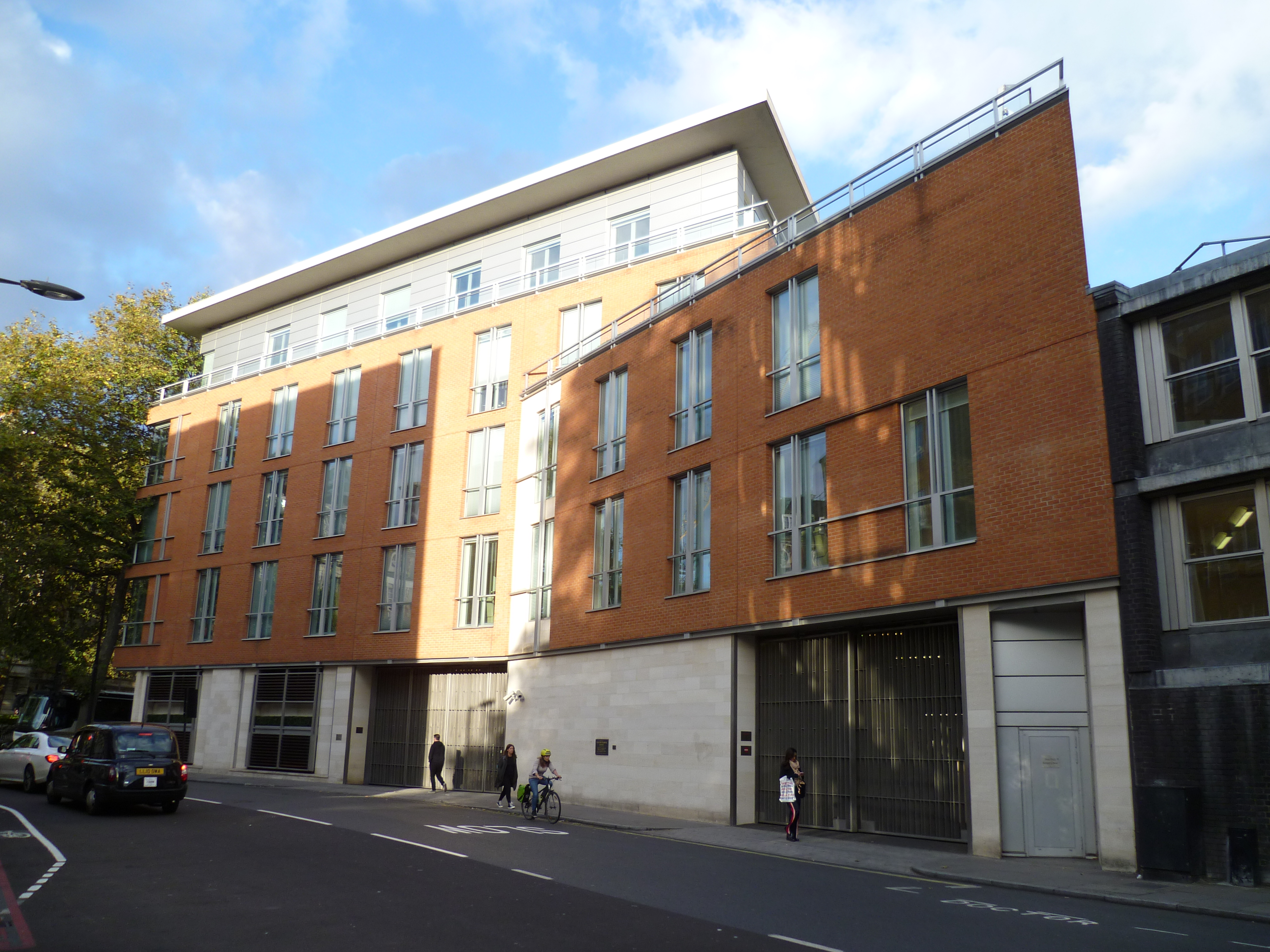
The former site of the Tyburn Manor House at the north end.

Marylebone High Street is a shopping street in London, running sub-parallel to Baker Street and terminating at its northern end at the junction with Marylebone Road. Given its secluded location, the street has been described as "the hidden wonder of the West End" and it was voted Best Street in London in 2002 by listeners of BBC Radio 4, winning praise for its being "a haven in the middle of the frantic city." Marylebone High Street was also an electoral ward of the City of Westminster from 2002 to 2022; its population at the 2011 Census was 10,366.

== History ==
Soon after the construction of St Marylebone Parish Church on the north end of the street in approximately 1400, Marylebone High Street became the focus of the village of Marylebone; this is a role it has continued ever since.

Marylebone Gardens, on the east side of the street, was opened officially in 1738; it included a stylish concert venue which attracted eminent composers such as George Frideric Handel and James Hook. The entrance to the Gardens was through the Rose Tavern, a public house on 35-36 Marylebone High Street, which was the home of BBC London until September 2009 when it moved to BBC Broadcasting House.

The majority of the buildings on the street today date from 1900, since which point the street has been consistently revitalised by the main local landlord, Howard de Walden Estates. It has been credited with turning a "once-shabby area of central London" into an elegant street, which carefully manages its "mix of boutiques and small retailers." Property prices in the area have soared in recent years.
