= Bentinck family =

European nobility

Bentinck
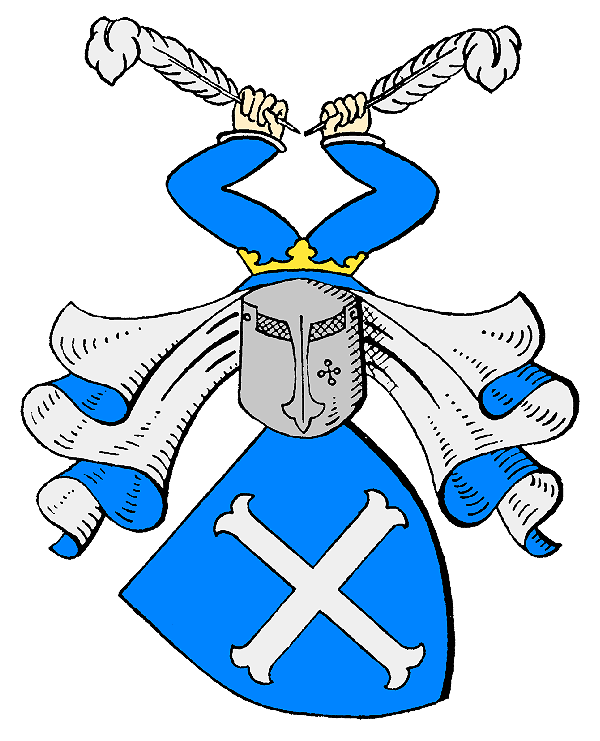
- Country: Netherlands; United Kingdom
- Founded: 14th century
- Founder: Johan Bentinck
- Titles: Netherlands: Baron Bentinck, Count Bentinck†; HRE: Count Bentinck (Imperial Count); England: Baron Cirencester, Viscount Woodstock, Earl of Portland; Great Britain: Marquess of Titchfield†, Duke of Portland†.

The House of Bentinck is a prominent European family belonging to Dutch, German and British nobility. Its members have served in the armed forces and as ambassadors and politicians, including as Governor General of India and as Prime Minister of the United Kingdom. The family is related to the British royal family through the maternal Cavendish-Bentinck line of Queen Elizabeth The Queen Mother.

Lord William Henry Cavendish-Bentinck 1774–1839, Governor General of India, son of Lord William Cavendish-Bentinck, 3rd Earl of Portland is missing from the family tree.

== History ==
The name Bentinck is a patronymic variation of the Old Germanic name Bento. The family is originally from the east of the Netherlands and is regarded as Uradel nobility, or noble from earliest times. The oldest known ancestor is Johan Bentinck, who owned land near Heerde and is mentioned in documents between 1343 and 1386.

An important British branch was founded by Hans Willem Bentinck, 1st Earl of Portland, who accompanied William Henry, Prince of Orange to England during the Glorious Revolution. The head of this line was initially given the title of Earl of Portland (later Duke of Portland).

In 1732, the title of Count Bentinck (Graf Bentinck), of the Holy Roman Empire, was created for Willem Bentinck, the second surviving son of the 1st Earl of Portland. A Royal Licence of 1886 was created which allowed the use of this title in Britain. The Royal Warrant of 27 April 1932 abolished the use of foreign titles in the United Kingdom but extended the special allowance in 13 cases, including the Bentinck comital title "during the lives of the present holders, their heirs, and their heir's heir, provided such heir's heir is now in existence." That exception has now expired. Another branch with the title of count existed in the Netherlands, but it died out in the male line.

The Dutch and British branches of the family continue to exist and belong to the Dutch nobility, German nobility and British nobility.

=== The Lordship of In- and Kniphausen ===
The counts of Bentinck were sovereign rulers of the Lordship of In- and Kniphausen, a territory of two parts in and around what is now the city of Wilhelmshaven. Originally subject to Brussels, the general reorganisation of the Holy Empire in 1803 (Reichsdeputationshauptschluss) granted Imperial immediacy until the dissolution of the Holy Empire in 1806. The Lordship maintained a precarious independence until 1810, when France annexed it and the whole German North Sea coast to enforce the Continental System. At the Congress of Vienna in 1815, the Lordship was denied admittance to the German Confederation in deference to Tsar Alexander I, who wished to see the territory annexed by his cousin, the Grand Duke of Oldenburg. Count Bentinck fought for his little state, however, and at the Congress of Aix-la-Chapelle in 1818, the Great Powers agreed that the Count's territory should be granted limited sovereignty.

The Frankfurt Convention of 10 July 1819 recognised In- and Kniphausen as sovereign within its own borders but under the protection of Oldenburg. The Treaty of Berlin on 8 June 1825 finalized the terms. In- and Kniphausen was permitted its own commercial flag, which its vessels bore on the high seas. Nevertheless, there was a long dispute between the Oldenburg and the Bentinck families in the latter's inheritance. This dispute was not ended until 1854 with a settlement in which the Bentinck family renounced its sovereignty for financial compensation and certain property rights. The Counts of Bentinck no longer claimed sovereignty over In- and Kniphausen.

Even before the final settlement, Oldenburg and Prussia had negotiated the Treaty of Jade of 1853 in which Oldenburg agreed to sell 340 hectares of Kniphausen territory to Prussia as a naval station for its North Sea Fleet. The cession became the city of Wilhelmshaven.

== Today ==
The Dutch estate of the Bentinck family since the 16th century, Schoonheten House, is situated between the villages Heeten and Raalte in Overijssel. The area contains 5 km^{2} (1.9 sq mi) of forests and cultivated land. Today the family mainly earns its living by forestry, agriculture and renting holiday houses. The British branch of the family owns Bothal Castle (Bothal Estates) in Northumberland and Welbeck Abbey (Welbeck Estates), the ancestral seat of the Dukes of Portland in Nottinghamshire. Gary Ramsay Bentinck, Baron Bentinck (1964), is head of both the British baronial branch and the Dutch family.

== Members ==
- Hendrik Bentinck (c. 1397–1477)
  - Henrich Bentinck (died 1502)
    - Hendrik Bentinck (c. 1468–1538), Dutch steward of the Veluwe region, and diplomat
      - Willem Bentinck (died 1576)
        - Eusebius Bentinck (died 1584)
          - Hendrik Bentinck (1563–1639)
            - Berent Bentinck (1597–1668)
              - Eusebius Borchart Bentinck (1643–1710)
                - Willem Bentinck (1673–1747)
                  - Berend Hendrik Bentinck (1702–1773)
                    - Derk Bentinck (1741–1813)
                      - Berend Hendrik Wolter Jan Bentinck (1781–1849)
                        - Walter Theodore Edward Bentinck (1840–1901)
                          - Reginald Joseph Bentinck (1866–1937)
                            - Moyra de Vere Bentinck (1917–1997), married to Dom Mintoff, Prime Minister of Malta
                              - Yana Mintoff (born 1951)
                          - Sir Rudolph Walter Bentinck (1868–1947), Royal Navy admiral
                            - Wolf Walter Rudolph Bentinck (1903–1992)
                              - Vivian Mark Bentinck (born 1945)
                                - Alice Bentinck (born 1986), British entrepreneur
                          - Bernhard Bentinck (1877–1931), English cricketer
                    - Wolter Jan Gerrit Bentinck (1745–1781), Dutch naval hero
                    - Carel Bentinck (1751–1825), Dutch lieutenant-general
                    - Berend Hendrik Bentinck tot Buckhorst (1753–1830), Dutch soldier and statesman
                - Hendrik Adolf Bentinck (1678–1734)
                  - Willem Bentinck (1721–1784)
                    - Adolf Carel Bentinck van Nijenhuis (1764–1837), Dutch politician
                      - Arnold Adolf Bentinck van Nijenhuis (1798–1868), Dutch politician
                      - John Adolf Bentinck (1824–1917)
                        - Johannes Adolf Bentinck (1857–1941)
                          - Johannes Adolf Bentinck (1890–1953)
                            - Johannes Adolf Bentinck (1916–2000), Dutch major-general
                              - Udo Bentinck (born 1940), Dutch judge
              - William Bentinck, 1st Earl of Portland (1649–1709), Dutch general and diplomat; English peer from 1689
                - Henry Bentinck, 1st Duke of Portland (1682–1726), Dutch-born British politician and colonial statesman
                  - William Bentinck, 2nd Duke of Portland (1709–1762), British peer; married to Margaret Bentinck, Duchess of Portland (1715–1785), Cavendish heiress and bluestocking
                    - William Cavendish-Bentinck, 3rd Duke of Portland (1738–1809), British politician, twice Prime Minister; married to Dorothy Bentinck, Duchess of Portland (1750–1794)
                      - William Bentinck, 4th Duke of Portland (1768–1854), British politician
                        - William Cavendish-Scott-Bentinck, Marquess of Titchfield (1796–1824), British politician
                        - John Cavendish-Scott-Bentinck, 5th Duke of Portland (1800–1879), British aristocratic eccentric and recluse
                        - Lord George Bentinck (1802–1848), British politician and racehorse owner
                        - Lord Henry Bentinck (1804–1870), British politician
                      - Lord William Bentinck (1774–1839), British soldier and statesman, Governor-General of India
                      - Lord Charles Bentinck (1780–1826), British soldier and politician; married to Lady Charles Bentinck (1788–1875)
                        - Charles Cavendish-Bentinck (1817–1865), Church of England clergyman; married Louisa Cavendish-Bentinck (1832–1918)
                          - Cecilia Bowes-Lyon, Countess of Strathmore and Kinghorne, née Cavendish-Bentinck (1862–1938), maternal grandmother of Queen Elizabeth II
                        - Arthur Cavendish-Bentinck (1819–1877), British lieutenant-general
                          - William Cavendish-Bentinck, 6th Duke of Portland (1857–1943), British Conservative politician; married to Winifred Cavendish-Bentinck, Duchess of Portland (1863–1954)
                            - William Cavendish-Bentinck, 7th Duke of Portland (1893–1977), British Conservative politician; married to Ivy Cavendish-Bentinck, Duchess of Portland (1887–1982)
                              - Lady Anne Cavendish-Bentinck (1916–2008), British landowner, charity worker, art collector and horsewoman
                          - Lady Ottoline Morrell, née Cavendish-Bentinck (1873–1938), British society hostess
                      - Lord Frederick Guy Cavendish-Bentinck (1781–1828), British major-general
                        - George Augustus Frederick Cavendish-Bentinck (1821–1891)
                          - William George Cavendish-Bentinck (1854–1909), British Member of Parliament; married to Elizabeth Livingston Cavendish-Bentinck (1855–1943)
                          - Frederick Cavendish-Bentinck (1856–1948); married Ruth Cavendish-Bentinck (1867–1953), suffragist
                            - Ferdinand Cavendish-Bentinck, 8th Duke of Portland (1889–1980)
                            - Victor Cavendish-Bentinck, 9th Duke of Portland (1897–1990), British diplomat and businessman
                    - Lord Edward Bentinck (1744–1819)
                  - Lord George Bentinck (1715–1759)
                - Mary Capel, Countess of Essex, née Bentinck (1679–1726)
                - Willem Bentinck van Rhoon, 1st Count Bentinck (1704–1774), Dutch politician; married Charlotte Sophie of Aldenburg (1715–1800), ruling Countess of Varel and Kniphausen
                  - Christiaan Frederik Anton Willem Karel Bentinck (1734–1768)
                    - Willem Gustaaf Frederik Bentinck, 2nd Count Bentinck (1762–1835), Dutch politician
                      - Willem Gustaaf Frederik Bentinck (1801–1867)
                        - Wilhelmine Augusta Friederike Bentinck (1834–1922); married in 1862 to James Smith (1822–1906)
                          - Mary Bentinck Smith (1864–1921), headmistress of St Leonards School 1907–1921
                          - William Frederick Bentinck-Smith (1872–1924)
                            - William Bentinck-Smith (1914–1993), Harvard University, administrator
                        - Willem Gustav Frederick Bentinck (1836–1871)
                    - Jan Carel van Aldenburg Bentinck (1763–1833)
                      - Willem Frederik Christiaan Bentinck, 3rd Count Bentinck (1787–1855)
                      - Carel Anton Ferdinand van Aldenburg Bentinck, 4th Count Bentinck (1792–1864)
                        - Henry Bentinck, 5th Count Bentinck (1846–1903), resigned his rights to his younger brothers 1874
                          - Count Robert Bentinck (1875–1932)
                            - Henry Bentinck, 11th Earl of Portland, 10th Count Bentinck (1919–1997), British Army officer and non-conformist intellectual
                              - Timothy Bentinck, 12th Earl of Portland, 11th Count Bentinck (born 1953), British actor and writer; married to Judy Bentinck (born 1952), British milliner
                                - William Bentinck, Viscount Woodstock (born 1984), English social entrepreneur and speaker
                          - Sir Charles Henry Bentinck (1879–1955), British diplomat who, after retirement, became an Anglican priest
                        - Willem van Aldenburg Bentinck, 6th Count Bentinck (1848–1912)
                          - Willem van Aldenburg Bentinck, 7th Count Bentinck (1880–1958)
                            - Isabelle van Aldenburg Bentinck (1925–2013)
                        - Carel Reinhard Adelbert van Aldenburg Bentinck (1853–1934)
                          - Marie von Aldenburg Bentinck (1879–1975)
                        - Godard Johan George Carel van Aldenburg Bentinck (1857–1940)
                          - Carel van Aldenburg Bentinck, 8th Count Bentinck (1885–1964)
                          - Adriaan van Aldenburg Bentinck, 9th Count Bentinck (1887–1968)
                      - Sir Henry John William Bentinck (1796–1876), British general
                    - Charles Ferdinand Bentinck (1764–1811), British colonial governor
                    - Henry William Bentinck (1765–1820), British colonial governor
                  - John Bentinck (1737–1775), Royal Navy captain, inventor and member of Parliament
                    - William Bentinck (1764–1813), Royal Navy admiral, Governor of St Vincent and the Grenadines
                      - George William Pierrepont Bentinck (1803–1886), British politician

== Family tree ==
Weston and Bentinck Family Trees including: Dukes of Portland, Earls of Portland, and Counts Bentinck

Baron Weston of Nayland in the County of Suffolk, 1628; Earl of Portland (1st creation), 1633
Richard Weston; 1577–1635; 1st Earl of Portland, etc.
Jerome Weston; 1605–1663; 2nd Earl of Portland, etc.	Thomas Weston; 1609–1688; 4th Earl of Portland, etc.
Earldom of Portland (1st creation) and subsidiary title extinct, 1688	The Weston and Bentinck families were not related despite both holding the Earldom of Portland.	Earl of Portland (2nd creation), and Viscount Woodstock, Baron Cirencester, 1689
Charles Weston; 1639–1665; 3rd Earl of Portland, etc.	Hans William Bentinck; 1649–1709; 1st Earl of Portland, etc.
Duke of Portland and Marquess of Titchfield, 1715	Count Bentinck, 1732
Willem Bentinck; 1681–1689	Henry Bentinck; 1682–1726; 1st Duke of Portland, etc. 2nd Earl of Portland, etc.	Willem Bentinck van Rhoon; 1704–1774; 1st Count Bentinck
William Bentinck; 1709–1762; 2nd Duke of Portland, etc. 3rd Earl of Portland, etc.	Christian Frederick Anthony Bentinck; 1734–1768	John Albert Bentinck; 1737–1775
William Henry Cavendish-Bentinck; 1738–1809; 3rd Duke of Portland, etc. 4th Earl of Portland, etc.	William Gustavus Frederic Bentinck; 1762–1835; 2nd Count Bentinck	John Charles Bentinck; 1763–1833; 3rd Count Bentinck	William Bentinck; 1764–1813
William Henry Cavendish-Scott-Bentinck; 1768–1854; 4th Duke of Portland, etc. 5th Earl of Portland, etc.	William Charles Augustus Cavendish-Bentinck; 1780–1826	Frederick Cavendish-Bentinck; 1781–1828	Charles Anthony Ferdinand Bentinck; 1792–1864; 4th Count Bentinck	George William Pierrepont Bentinck; 1803–1886
William Henry Cavendish-Scott-Bentinck; 1796–1824 styled Marquess of Titchfield	William John Cavendish-Scott-Bentinck; 1800–1879; 5th Duke of Portland, etc. 6th Earl of Portland, etc.	Arthur Cavendish-Bentinck; 1819–1877	George Augustus Frederick Cavendish-Bentinck; 1821–1891	Henry Charles Adolphus Frederick William Bentinck; 1846–1903; 5th Count Bentinck	William Charles Philip Otto Bentinck; 1848–1912; 6th Count Bentinck	Count Godard John George Charles Bentinck; 1857–1940
William John Arthur Charles James Cavendish-Bentinck; 1857–1943; 6th Duke of Portland, etc. 7th Earl of Portland, etc.	William George Frederick Cavendish-Bentinck; 1856–1948	Count Robert Charles Bentinck; 1875–1932	William Frederick Charles Henry Bentinck; 1880–1958; 7th Count Bentinck	Charles Arthur Reynard William Godard Augustus Bentinck; 1885–1964; 8th Count Bentinck	Godard Adrian Henry Julius Bentinck; 1887–1968; 9th Count Bentinck
Earl of Portland (2nd creation) reverted, 1990
William Arthur Henry Cavendish-Bentinck; 1893–1977; 7th Duke of Portland, etc. 8th Earl of Portland, etc.	Ferdinand William Cavendish-Bentinck; 1888–1980; 8th Duke of Portland, etc. 9th Earl of Portland, etc.	Victor Frederick William Cavendish-Bentinck; 1897–1990; 9th Duke of Portland, etc. 10th Earl of Portland, etc.	Henry Noel Bentinck; 1919–1997; 11th Earl of Portland, etc., 10th Count Bentinck
Dukedom of Portland extinct, 1990
William James Cavendish-Bentinck; 1925–1966	Timothy Charles Robert Noel Bentinck b. 1953; 12th Earl of Portland, etc., 11th Count Bentinck
William Jack Henry Bentinck b. 1984 styled Viscount Woodstock	Jasper James Mellowes Bentinck b. 1988
Heir apparent to the Earldom of Portland

== Legacy ==
- Bentinck Island near Victoria, British Columbia at 48°18′54.08″N 123°32′30.32″W may have been named after Lord George Bentinck.
- North and South Bentinck Arms, inlets off Burke Channel, were named after William Cavendish-Bentinck, 3rd Duke of Portland by Captain Vancouver in 1793. North Bentinck Arm is significant in the history of Canada because it was here in 1793 that Sir Alexander Mackenzie completed the first recorded transcontinental crossing of North America by a European north of Mexico.
- HMS Bentinck, Royal Navy ships named after Captain John Bentinck.
- After Kaiser Wilhelm II fled to the Netherlands at the end of World War I, he was housed at Amerongen Castle, belonging to Count Bentinck.
- HMS Portland (F79) is a type 23 frigate (Duke class) named after the Dukes of Portland. It is the eighth ship to hold the title.
- Bentinck Street and Bentinck School, in the Radford area of Nottingham, bear the family name. John Bentinck, 5th Duke of Portland lived at Welbeck Abbey near Clumber Park in North Nottinghamshire.
- Bentinck Street, near Cavendish Square in the West End of London, bears the family name.
- Bentinckia, a genus of palms named after Lord William Bentinck, Governor General of British India.
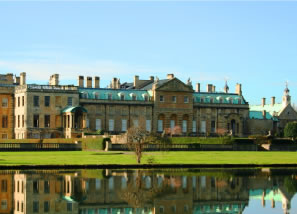
Welbeck Abbey

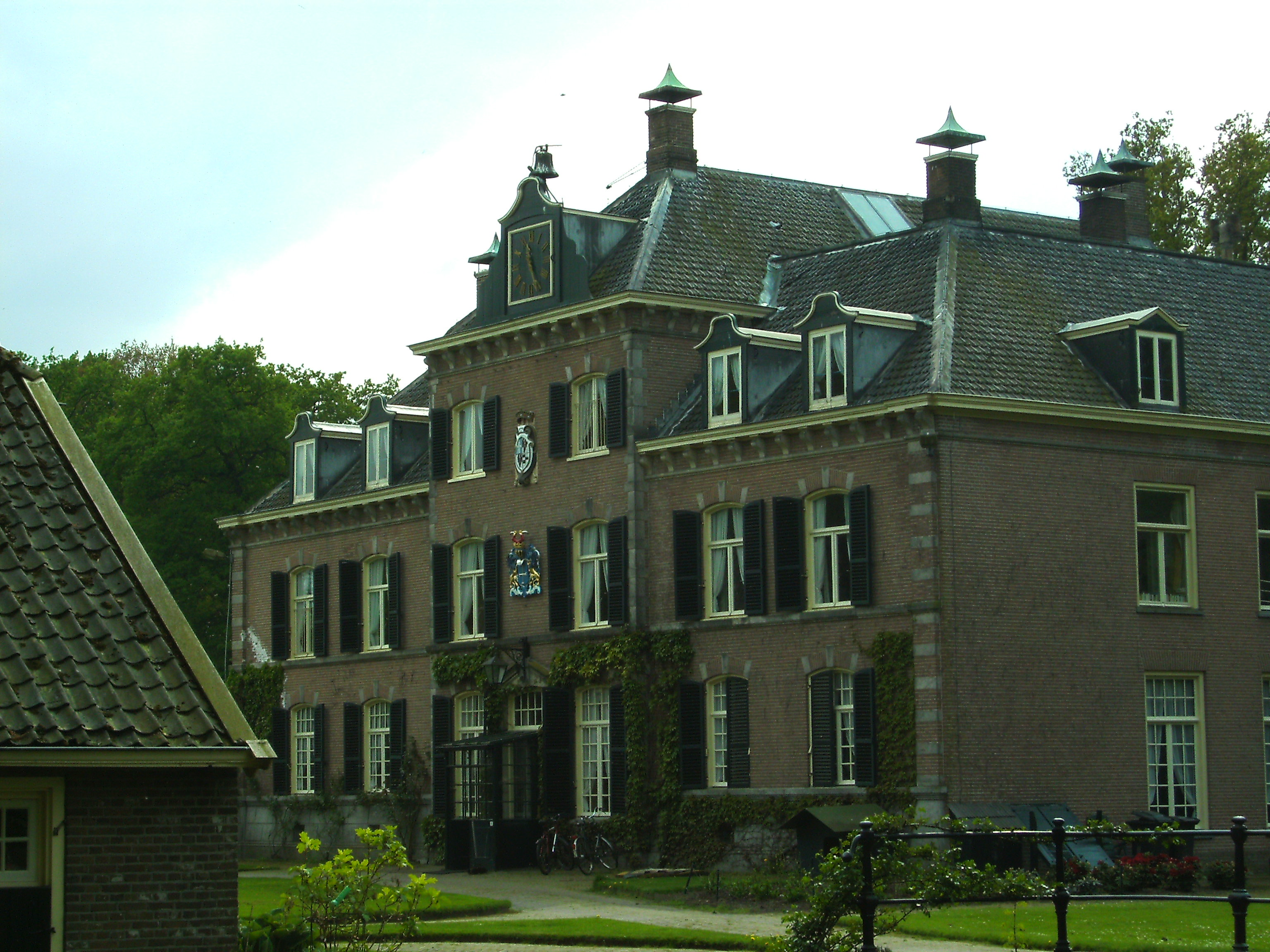
Schoonheten Manor

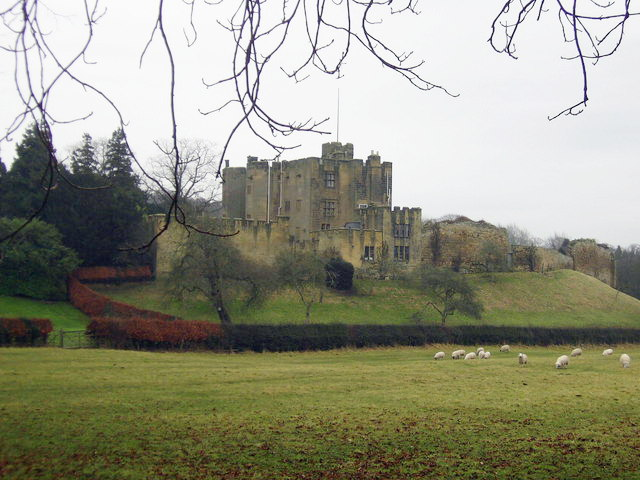
Bothal Castle

Arms of the Bentinck family, Earls of Portland

Arms of the Cavendish-Bentinck family, Dukes of Portland

Arms of Aldenburg-Bentinck, Counts of the Holy Roman Empire
