= Cavendish-Bentinck =

Family name

Arms of the Dukes of Portland, quartering the arms of the Bentinck family and the Cavendish family

Cavendish-Bentinck is a surname associated with the Dukes of Portland and their descendants. Bentinck is a Dutch surname brought to England by William Bentinck, an advisor to William III of England. Cavendish was added to the family name by Bentinck's great-grandson the 3rd Duke of Portland, who married in 1766 Lady Dorothy Cavendish, daughter of the 4th Duke of Devonshire. By a family arrangement, she was the heiress to estates which had previously belonged to the defunct Newcastle branch of the Cavendish family, including Welbeck Abbey, which became the principal seat of the Dukes of Portland. Following the death of the 9th Duke in 1990, the family name became extinct.

== Members ==
People with this surname include:

- Lady Anne Cavendish-Bentinck (1916–2008)
- William Cavendish-Bentinck, 3rd Duke of Portland (1738–1809), British Whig and Tory statesman and Prime Minister
- Lord William Bentinck (1774–1839), British statesman
- Lord William Charles Augustus Cavendish-Bentinck (1780–1826), great-great-grandfather of Queen Elizabeth II
- Lord George Cavendish-Scott-Bentinck (1802–1848)
- Charles William Frederick Cavendish-Bentinck (1817–1865), Church of England clergyman
- Caroline Cavendish-Bentinck (1832–1918), great-grandmother of Queen Elizabeth II
- Cecilia Cavendish-Bentinck (1862–1938), maternal grandmother of Queen Elizabeth II
- Elizabeth Livingston Cavendish-Bentinck (1855–1943)
- Prudence Penelope Cavendish Bentinck, who was painted by George Frederic Watts
- William Cavendish-Bentinck, 6th Duke of Portland (1857–1943), Knight of the Garter
- Lord Henry Cavendish-Bentinck (1863–1931)
- William Cavendish-Bentinck, 7th Duke of Portland (1893–1977), 2nd Chancellor of the University of Nottingham
- George Cavendish-Bentinck (1821–1891), Conservative politician
- Ferdinand Cavendish-Bentinck, 8th Duke of Portland (1888–1980), English nobleman, grandson of the above
- Victor Cavendish-Bentinck, 9th Duke of Portland (1897–1990), British diplomat, brother of the above
