= Henry Bentinck =

Henry Bentinck may refer to:

- Henry Bentinck, 1st Duke of Portland (1682–1726), British MP for Southampton and governor of Jamaica
- Henry Bentinck (British Army officer) (1796–1878), British general and courtier
- Lord Henry Bentinck (1804–1870), British MP for Nottinghamshire North
- Henry Bentinck, 11th Earl of Portland (1919–1997), British intellectual, peer and TV-producer
- Henry William Bentinck (1765–1820), Dutch-born military officer, planter and colonial administrator

== See also ==
- Lord Henry Cavendish-Bentinck (1863–1931), British MP for Norfolk North-West and Nottingham South, Lord Lieutenant of Westmorland
