= Earl of Portland =

Title in the Peerage of England

Earldom of Portland
- Arms of the Earl of Portland Blazon Arms: Azure, a cross moline argent. Crests: Out of a ducal coronet proper two arms counter-embowed vested gules, on the hands gloves or, each holding an ostrich feather argent. Supporters: Two lions double queued, the dexter or, the sinister sable. Motto: Craignez Honte (Fear Dishonour).
- Creation date: 9 April 1689
- Creation: Second
- Created by: William III
- Peerage: Peerage of England
- First holder: William Bentinck
- Present holder: Timothy Bentinck, 12th Earl of Portland
- Heir apparent: William Bentinck, Viscount Woodstock
- Remainder to: Heirs male of the first earl's body lawfully begotten
- Subsidiary titles: Viscount Woodstock; Baron Cirencester
- Former seat: Welbeck Abbey
- Motto: Craignez honte ("Fear shame")

Earl of Portland is a title that has been created twice in the Peerage of England, firstly in 1633 and secondly in 1689. What proved to be a long co-held title, Duke of Portland, was created in 1716 and became extinct in 1990 upon the death of the ninth Duke, at which point the earldom passed to the most senior agnatic cousin, namely one of the 6th degree.

== First creation (1633) ==
The title of Earl of Portland was first created for the politician Richard Weston, 1st Baron Weston, in 1633. He was Chancellor of the Exchequer from 1621 to 1628 and Lord High Treasurer from 1628 to 1635. He had already been created Baron Weston of Nayland in the County of Suffolk in 1628; this title was also in the Peerage of England. He was succeeded by his son, the second Earl. He served as Joint Lord Lieutenant of Hampshire. His son, the third Earl, was killed at the Battle of Lowestoft in 1665. He was unmarried and was succeeded by his uncle, the fourth Earl. He was childless and on his death in 1688, the titles became extinct.

== Second creation (1689) ==
Dukedom of Portland Extinct
- Arms of the Duke of Portland Blazon Arms: Quarterly, 1 & 4 Azure, a cross moline argent (Bentinck); 2 & 3 Sable, three stags' heads cabossed argent attired or, a crescent for difference (Cavendish). Crests: Dexter: Out of a ducal coronet proper two arms counter-embowed vested gules, on the hands gloves or, each holding an ostrich feather argent (Bentinck); Sinister: A snake nowed proper (Cavendish). Supporters: Two lions double queued, the dexter or, the sinister sable. Motto: Craignez Honte (Fear Dishonour).
- Creation date: 6 July 1716
- Created by: George I
- Peerage: Peerage of Great Britain
- First holder: Henry Bentinck, 2nd Earl of Portland
- Last holder: Victor Cavendish-Bentinck, 9th Duke
- Remainder to: the 1st Duke's heirs male of the body lawfully begotten
- Subsidiary titles: Marquess of Titchfield; Earl of Portland; Viscount Woodstock; Baron Cirencester; Baron Bolsover (1880–1977)
- Extinction date: 30 July 1990
- Former seats: Welbeck Abbey; Bothal Castle

The title was created for a second time in 1689 in favour of William Bentinck, the Dutch favourite and close adviser of King William III. He was made Baron Cirencester and Viscount Woodstock at the same time he was given the earldom, also in the Peerage of England.

The first Earl was succeeded in 1709 by his son from his first marriage, Henry Bentinck, who became the second Earl. He had represented Southampton and Hampshire in the House of Commons. In 1716, he was created Marquess of Titchfield and Duke of Portland in the Peerage of Great Britain.

His grandson, William Cavendish-Bentinck, 3rd Duke of Portland, was a noted politician. He was Prime Minister in 1783 and from 1807 to 1809, and he also served as Home Secretary and as Lord President of the Council. In 1801, he assumed by Royal licence the additional surname of Cavendish (to form Cavendish-Bentinck). He was the husband of Lady Dorothy Cavendish, daughter of William Cavendish, 4th Duke of Devonshire, and was a descendant on his mother's side of Henry Cavendish, 2nd Duke of Newcastle-upon-Tyne.

The third Duke was succeeded by his eldest son, William Bentinck, 4th Duke of Portland. The fourth Duke was also a politician and served as Lord Privy Seal in 1827 and as Lord President of the Council from 1827 to 1828. He married Henrietta Scott, daughter of Major-General John Scott, in 1795 and assumed by Royal licence the same year the additional surname of Scott in the manner of Cavendish-Bentinck. His eldest son and heir apparent, William Cavendish-Scott-Bentinck, Marquess of Titchfield, represented two constituencies in Parliament but died unmarried in 1824, 15 years before his father. The fourth Duke was therefore succeeded by his second son, William Cavendish-Scott-Bentinck, 5th Duke of Portland. The fifth Duke is remembered as a capable architect and engineer but eccentric, who excavated an underground art gallery and library under his estate at Welbeck Abbey.

The fifth Duke died unmarried and was succeeded by his first cousin once removed, William Cavendish-Bentinck, 6th Duke of Portland, who was the only son from the first marriage of Lieutenant-General Arthur Cavendish-Bentinck, younger son of Lord Charles Bentinck, the third son of the third Duke. Charles' first son, also named Charles, was a maternal great-grandfather of Queen Elizabeth II. In 1880, the sixth Duke also succeeded his stepmother as second Baron Bolsover. He was a Conservative politician and served as Master of the Horse from 1886 to 1892 and from 1895 to 1905.

His eldest son, William Cavendish-Bentinck, 7th Duke of Portland, was also a Conservative politician and served as a Junior Lord of the Treasury from 1927 to 1929 and in 1932. The seventh Duke had no sons and was succeeded by his third cousin, Ferdinand Cavendish-Bentinck, 8th Duke of Portland, a great-grandson of Major-General Lord Frederick Cavendish-Bentinck, fourth son of the third Duke. The barony of Bolsover became extinct upon the death of the seventh Duke.

The great estates which had been entailed with the dukedom for generations, including Welbeck Abbey, were separated from the title by the sixth Duke, who broke the entail and created a trust which ultimately ensured that his granddaughter Lady Anne Cavendish-Bentinck inherited the ducal wealth on the death of her father, the seventh duke.

The eighth Duke was a colonial administrator in British Kenya and served as Speaker of the Legislative Assembly of Kenya. He was childless and was succeeded by his younger brother, Victor Cavendish-Bentinck, 9th Duke of Portland, a diplomat who had served as British Ambassador to Poland. The ninth Duke's only son, William James Cavendish-Bentinck (1925–1966), died before him without issue. Upon the ninth Duke's death in 1990 at the age of 93, the dukedom of Portland and the marquessate of Titchfield became extinct.

The ninth Duke was succeeded in his other peerages by his sixth cousin, Henry Bentinck, 11th Earl of Portland. He was the great-great-great-great-grandson of Willem Bentinck, 1st Count Bentinck (1704–1774), eldest son of the first Earl from his second marriage, who had been created a Count of the Holy Roman Empire in 1732 (with a Royal licence of 1886 to use the title in England). As of 2017, the titles are held by his only son, the twelfth Earl, born in Australia, who is also Count Bentinck of the Holy Roman Empire. He is an actor known by his professional name, Tim Bentinck.

== Other members of the Cavendish-Bentinck family ==
Several other members of the Cavendish-Bentinck family have also gained distinction. Lord William Bentinck, second son of the third Duke, was a prominent soldier, politician and colonial administrator. The aforementioned Arthur Cavendish-Bentinck was a lieutenant-general in the British Army. His grandson Lord Henry Cavendish-Bentinck was a Conservative politician. Lord Frederick Cavendish-Bentinck, fourth son of the third Duke, was a major-general in the army and a Tory MP. His only son George Cavendish-Bentinck was a Conservative politician. Lord George Bentinck, fifth son of the fourth Duke, was a Tory politician. John Charles Bentinck, grandson of the Hon. William Bentinck, eldest son from the second marriage of the 1st Earl, was also a major-general in the army. His younger son Sir Henry John William Bentinck was also a noted soldier. Margaret Bentinck, Duchess of Portland, wife of the second Duke, was a wealthy heiress and collector. Cecilia Bowes-Lyon, Countess of Strathmore and Kinghorne, maternal grandmother of Elizabeth II, was a Cavendish-Bentinck before marriage.

== Estates and residences ==
=== Country seat ===
The seat of the Dukes of Portland was Welbeck Abbey, Nottinghamshire. Welbeck Abbey and its many acres continued in the senior branch of the family (becoming Cavendish-Bentinck) through the ancestry of a daughter of the 7th Duke. The mansion was in the early 21st century restored as a family home after many years of institutional use. The Dukes of Portland also owned the village of Pegswood in Northumberland.

The traditional burial place of the Dukes of Portland at Welbeck Abbey was the churchyard of St Winifred's Church in the nearby village of Holbeck.

=== Estates ===
In the 1883 edition of John Bateman's The Great Landowners of Great Britain and Ireland, William Cavendish-Bentinck, 6th Duke of Portland's estates were recorded as spanning 183,199 acres across England and Scotland, including 43,036 acres in Nottinghamshire, 12,337 acres in Northumberland, 8,074 acres in Derbyshire, 903 acres in Lincolnshire, 591 acres in Norfolk, 9 acres in Worcestershire, 5 acres in Buckinghamshire, 17,244 acres in Ayrshire, and 101,000 acres in Caithness, which produced a combined annual income of £88,350. Bateman noted that the Duke of Portland enjoyed an additional annual income of £19,570 arising from mines on his estates, rendering his total annual income as approximately £107,900.

=== London residences ===
William Bentinck, 1st Earl of Portland was granted a lease of a house within the grounds of the Palace of Whitehall in 1696. By the time William Cavendish-Bentinck, 3rd Duke of Portland inherited the dukedom in 1762, the house had fallen into a poor state of repair; in 1766, the 3rd Duke married Lady Dorothy Cavendish, and preferred to reside at her family’s London home, Devonshire House. In 1825 his son, William Bentinck, 4th Duke of Portland, purchased Harcourt House, Cavendish Square, in Marylebone. The house was later inherited by his eldest surviving son, John Bentinck, 5th Duke of Portland, who died there in 1879. By August 1880, the 5th Duke’s executors were attempting to sell the lease of Harcourt House; contemporary advertisements noted that the lease then had an unexpired term of 43 years, at an annual rent of £1,500.

The 5th Duke was succeeded by his cousin, William Cavendish-Bentinck, 6th Duke of Portland, who leased No. 3 Grosvenor Square from 1890 until November 1935; the house was demolished the following year. By January 1936, the Duke had purchased the lease of a new London townhouse at No. 17 Hill Street, Mayfair. The Portlands were still occupying the house in July 1939, when they hosted Queen Mary for dinner. By 1948, the house was being used as offices by the British Institute of Management. By October 1952, the house had reportedly stood vacant for several years and dry rot had set in.

== Place name legacies ==
- Portland, Victoria
- Portland House in London
- A house of Welbeck College
- Portland College in Nottinghamshire
- Portland, Netherlands [nl]

== Historical documents ==
Two major collections of papers of the Cavendish-Bentinck Dukes of Portland have been deposited at the department of Manuscripts and Special Collections, The University of Nottingham. A complementary archive collection has been deposited at Nottinghamshire Archives.

== Earls of Portland; First creation (1633) ==
- Richard Weston, 1st Earl of Portland (1577–1635)
- Jerome Weston, 2nd Earl of Portland (1605–1663)
- Charles Weston, 3rd Earl of Portland (1639–1665)
- Thomas Weston, 4th Earl of Portland (1609–1688)

== Earls of Portland; Second creation (1689) ==
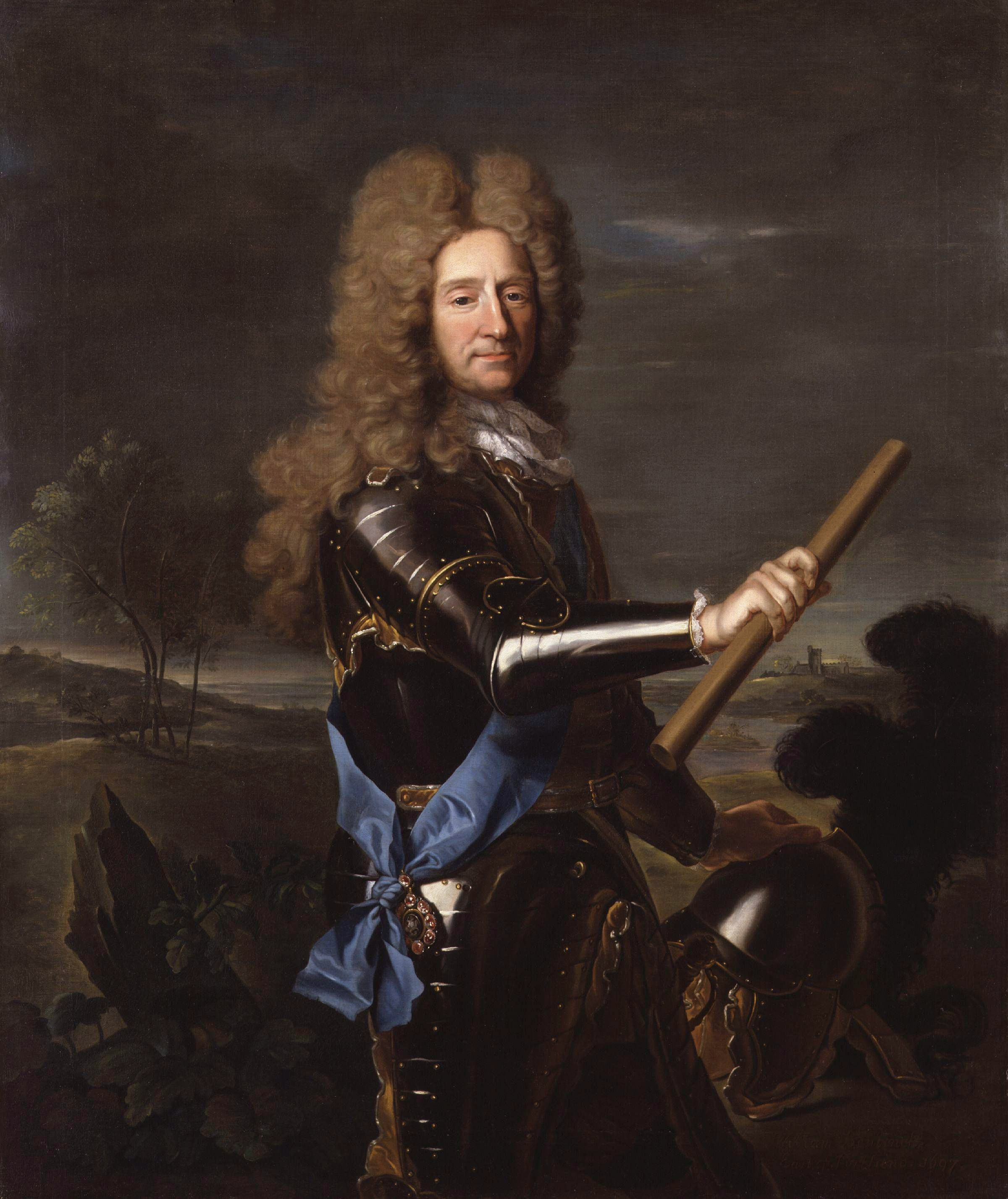
William Bentinck, 1st Earl of Portland

- Hans William Bentinck, 1st Earl of Portland (1649–1709)
  - Willem Bentinck (1681–1688), eldest son of the 1st Earl, died young
- Henry Bentinck, 2nd Earl of Portland (1682–1726), second son of the 1st Earl, created Duke of Portland in 1715

== Dukes of Portland (1716) ==
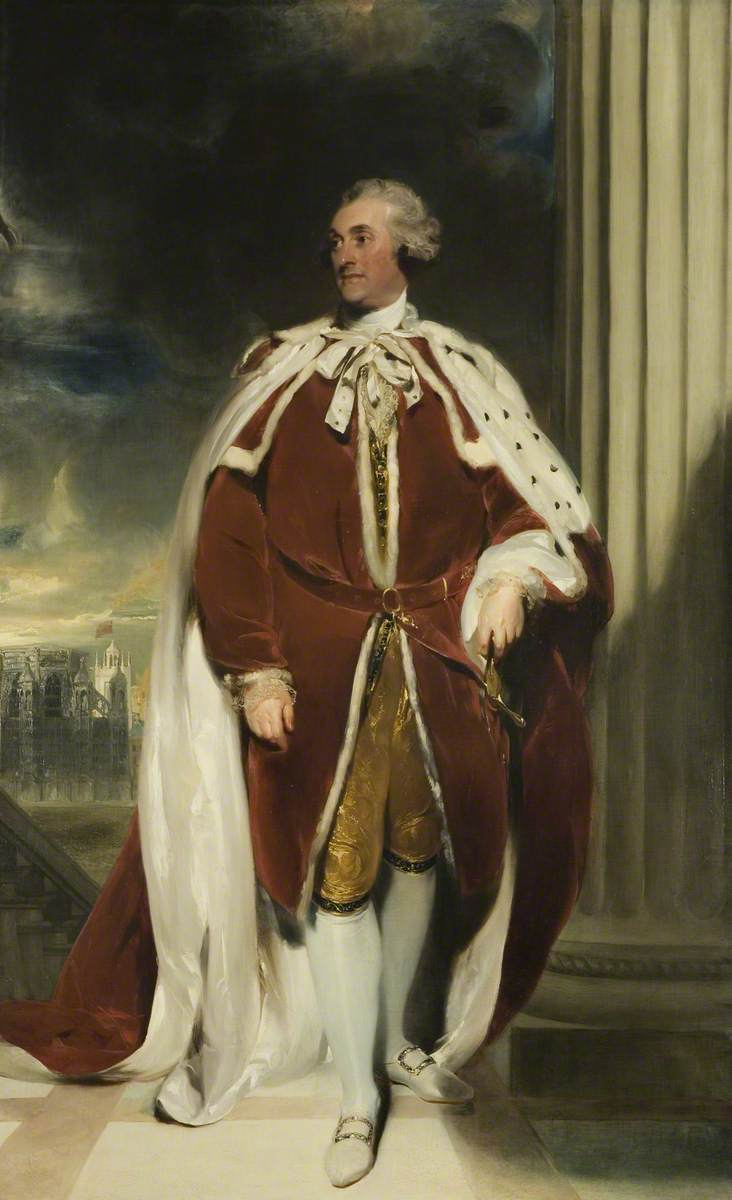
Portrait of the Duke of Portland by Thomas Lawrence, 1792. William Cavendish-Bentinck, 3rd Duke of Portland, who twice served as Prime Minister

- Henry Bentinck, 1st Duke of Portland (1682–1726), second son of the 1st Earl
- William Bentinck, 2nd Duke of Portland (1709–1762), eldest son of the 1st Duke
- William Henry Cavendish-Bentinck, 3rd Duke of Portland (1738–1809), eldest son of the 2nd Duke
- William Henry Cavendish-Scott-Bentinck, 4th Duke of Portland (1768–1854), eldest son of the 3rd Duke
  - William Henry Cavendish-Scott-Bentinck, Marquess of Titchfield (1796–1824), eldest son of the 4th Duke, predeceased his father unmarried
- William John Cavendish-Scott-Bentinck, 5th Duke of Portland (1800–1879), second son of the 4th Duke, died unmarried
- William John Arthur Charles James Cavendish-Bentinck, 6th Duke of Portland (1857–1943), grandson of Lt.-Col. Lord William Charles Augustus Cavendish-Bentinck, third son of the 3rd Duke
- William Arthur Henry Cavendish-Bentinck, 7th Duke of Portland (1893–1977), eldest son of the 6th Duke, died without male issue
- Ferdinand William Cavendish-Bentinck, 8th Duke of Portland (1888–1980), great-grandson of Maj.-Gen. Lord Frederick Cavendish-Bentinck, fourth son of the 3rd Duke, died without issue
- Victor Frederick William Cavendish-Bentinck, 9th Duke of Portland (1897–1990), younger brother of the 8th Duke, dukedom became extinct upon his death
  - William James Cavendish-Bentinck (1925–1966), only son of the 9th Duke, predeceased his father without issue

== Earls of Portland; Second creation (1689; Reverted) ==
- Henry Noel Bentinck, 11th Earl of Portland (1919–1997), great-great-great-great-grandson of Willem Bentinck, 1st Count Bentinck, third son of the 1st Earl
- Timothy Charles Robert Noel Bentinck, 12th Earl of Portland (born 1953), only son of the 11th Earl

The heir apparent is the present holder's eldest son, William Jack Henry Bentinck, Viscount Woodstock (born 1984).

== Counts Bentinck, of the Holy Roman Empire (1732) ==
In 1732, the title Count Bentinck (Graf Bentinck), of the Holy Roman Empire, was created by Emperor Charles VI in the Duchy of Guelders for Willem Bentinck, the second surviving son of Hans William Bentinck, 1st Earl of Portland.

- Willem Bentinck, 1st Count Bentinck (1704–1774), son of the 1st Earl of Portland and his second wife, Jane Martha Temple
- William Gustavus Frederick Bentinck, 2nd Count Bentinck (1762–1835), grandson of the 1st Count
- John Charles Bentinck, 3rd Count Bentinck (1763–1833), brother of the 2nd Count
- Charles Anthony Ferdinand Bentinck, 4th Count Bentinck (1792–1864), son of the 3rd Count
- Henry Charles Adolphus Frederick William Bentinck, 5th Count Bentinck (1846–1903, who married in Dec 1874 Harriet Eliza McKerrell, of the McKerrells, lairds of Hillhouse), son of the 4th Count

The 5th Count Bentinck renounced the title in 1875, thus his younger brother William became the 6th Count. However, in 1886, the former 5th Count was granted a Royal Licence which allowed him and his descendants the use of the title Count (or Countess) before their Christian names.

- William Charles Philip Otto Bentinck, 6th Count Bentinck (1848–1912), brother of the 5th Count
- William Frederick Bentinck, 7th Count Bentinck (1880–1958), son of the 6th Count
- Charles Bentinck, 8th Count Bentinck (1885–1964), first cousin of the 7th Count
- Godard Adrian Henry Jules Bentinck, 9th Count Bentinck (1887–1968), brother of the 8th Count
- Henry Noel Bentinck, 10th Count Bentinck (1919–1997), grandson of the 5th Count and first cousin once removed of the 9th Count; already the 10th Count Bentinck since 1968, in 1990 he also became the 11th Earl of Portland after inheriting the English peerage from a distant cousin
- Timothy Charles Robert Noel Bentinck, 11th Count Bentinck (born 1953), son of the 10th Count; he is also the 12th Earl of Portland and is known as the actor Tim Bentinck

The heir apparent is the present holder's eldest son, William Jack Henry Bentinck (born 1984), whose courtesy title is Viscount Woodstock.

== Family tree ==
Weston and Bentinck Family Trees including: Dukes of Portland, Earls of Portland, and Counts Bentinck

Baron Weston of Nayland in the County of Suffolk, 1628; Earl of Portland (1st creation), 1633
Richard Weston; 1577–1635; 1st Earl of Portland, etc.
Jerome Weston; 1605–1663; 2nd Earl of Portland, etc.	Thomas Weston; 1609–1688; 4th Earl of Portland, etc.
Earldom of Portland (1st creation) and subsidiary title extinct, 1688	The Weston and Bentinck families were not related despite both holding the Earldom of Portland.	Earl of Portland (2nd creation), and Viscount Woodstock, Baron Cirencester, 1689
Charles Weston; 1639–1665; 3rd Earl of Portland, etc.	Hans William Bentinck; 1649–1709; 1st Earl of Portland, etc.
Duke of Portland and Marquess of Titchfield, 1715	Count Bentinck, 1732
Willem Bentinck; 1681–1689	Henry Bentinck; 1682–1726; 1st Duke of Portland, etc. 2nd Earl of Portland, etc.	Willem Bentinck van Rhoon; 1704–1774; 1st Count Bentinck
William Bentinck; 1709–1762; 2nd Duke of Portland, etc. 3rd Earl of Portland, etc.	Christian Frederick Anthony Bentinck; 1734–1768	John Albert Bentinck; 1737–1775
William Henry Cavendish-Bentinck; 1738–1809; 3rd Duke of Portland, etc. 4th Earl of Portland, etc.	William Gustavus Frederic Bentinck; 1762–1835; 2nd Count Bentinck	John Charles Bentinck; 1763–1833; 3rd Count Bentinck	William Bentinck; 1764–1813
William Henry Cavendish-Scott-Bentinck; 1768–1854; 4th Duke of Portland, etc. 5th Earl of Portland, etc.	William Charles Augustus Cavendish-Bentinck; 1780–1826	Frederick Cavendish-Bentinck; 1781–1828	Charles Anthony Ferdinand Bentinck; 1792–1864; 4th Count Bentinck	George William Pierrepont Bentinck; 1803–1886
William Henry Cavendish-Scott-Bentinck; 1796–1824 styled Marquess of Titchfield	William John Cavendish-Scott-Bentinck; 1800–1879; 5th Duke of Portland, etc. 6th Earl of Portland, etc.	Arthur Cavendish-Bentinck; 1819–1877	George Augustus Frederick Cavendish-Bentinck; 1821–1891	Henry Charles Adolphus Frederick William Bentinck; 1846–1903; 5th Count Bentinck	William Charles Philip Otto Bentinck; 1848–1912; 6th Count Bentinck	Count Godard John George Charles Bentinck; 1857–1940
William John Arthur Charles James Cavendish-Bentinck; 1857–1943; 6th Duke of Portland, etc. 7th Earl of Portland, etc.	William George Frederick Cavendish-Bentinck; 1856–1948	Count Robert Charles Bentinck; 1875–1932	William Frederick Charles Henry Bentinck; 1880–1958; 7th Count Bentinck	Charles Arthur Reynard William Godard Augustus Bentinck; 1885–1964; 8th Count Bentinck	Godard Adrian Henry Julius Bentinck; 1887–1968; 9th Count Bentinck
Earl of Portland (2nd creation) reverted, 1990
William Arthur Henry Cavendish-Bentinck; 1893–1977; 7th Duke of Portland, etc. 8th Earl of Portland, etc.	Ferdinand William Cavendish-Bentinck; 1888–1980; 8th Duke of Portland, etc. 9th Earl of Portland, etc.	Victor Frederick William Cavendish-Bentinck; 1897–1990; 9th Duke of Portland, etc. 10th Earl of Portland, etc.	Henry Noel Bentinck; 1919–1997; 11th Earl of Portland, etc., 10th Count Bentinck
Dukedom of Portland extinct, 1990
William James Cavendish-Bentinck; 1925–1966	Timothy Charles Robert Noel Bentinck b. 1953; 12th Earl of Portland, etc., 11th Count Bentinck
William Jack Henry Bentinck b. 1984 styled Viscount Woodstock	Jasper James Mellowes Bentinck b. 1988
Heir apparent to the Earldom of Portland

== See also ==
- Baron Bolsover
- Bentinck family
- Bentinck family (Dutch Wikipedia)
- Duchess of Portland
- Edward Herbert (judge), created Earl of Portland in the Jacobite peerage in 1690 by James II of England while both were in exile
