= Governor Bentinck =

Governor Bentinck may refer to:

- William Bentinck (Royal Navy officer) (1764–1813), Governor of St. Vincent and the Grenadines from 1798 to 1802
- Lord William Bentinck (1774–1839), Governor-General of India from 1828 to 1835
