= Henry Bentinck, 11th Earl of Portland =

British Army officer (1919–1997)

The Right Honourable The Earl of Portland

Member of the House of Lords
- In office 30 July 1990 – 30 January 1997
- Preceded by: The 9th Duke of Portland
- Succeeded by: The 12th Earl of Portland

Personal details
- Born: 2 October 1919
- Died: 30 January 1997 (aged 77)
- Spouse(s): Pauline Fellowes (m. 1940) Jenifer Hopkins (m. 1974)
- Children: 2 daughters and a son

Military service
- Unit: Coldstream Guards
- Battles/wars: World War II: Italian campaign; Camino

Henry Noel Bentinck, 11th Earl of Portland, Count Bentinck (2 October 1919 – 30 January 1997), was a British Army officer, intellectual and hereditary member of the House of Lords.

== Early life and education ==
Born in the parish of St George Hanover Square, Westminster, his father Robert Charles Bentinck (1875–1932) died when he was aged twelve. His mother, Lady Norah Noel, eldest daughter of Charles William Francis Noel, 3rd Earl of Gainsborough, and a great-great-granddaughter of William IV, died when he was nineteen.

Bentinck was educated at Harrow before entering the Royal Military College, Sandhurst, but left after only a term amidst press headlines – "Count missing from Sandhurst".

He worked as a cowboy in California for a year, returning to Great Britain in 1939 and marrying Pauline Ursula Mellowes in 1940. He registered as a conscientious objector, but after the death of a close friend he enlisted in the Coldstream Guards, as a private soldier. Bentinck was soon commissioned as an officer and served with distinction in Italy at Camino. Wounded twice, then a prisoner of war until 1945, Bentinck rejoined his regiment at Trieste, later being appointed OStJ and Chevalier de la Légion d'honneur.

== Career ==
After the War he became a producer at the BBC, then from 1952 to 1955 Bentinck worked as a jackaroo on a sheep station in Tasmania. He rejoined the BBC, as producer of the Today programme presented by Jack de Manio and other series. At this time he wrote his first book, Anyone Can Understand the Atom. In 1959 he joined J. Walter Thompson as an advertising producer, working on over 600 commercials. Bentinck created and produced the Nimble bread balloon commercials, as well as the first campaign for Mr Kipling, himself coining the phrase, "Mr Kipling makes exceedingly good cakes".

Bentinck moved to Devon in 1974 with his second wife Jenny Hopkins to run a self-sufficient organic smallholding and guest-house for six years. Later he struck up a close friendship with James Lovelock, the creator of the Gaia hypothesis, and published Life is a Sum Humanity Is Doing Wrong.

Lord Portland died in 1997 at Little Cudworthy, Dolton, Devon.

== Marriages and children ==
Bentinck married firstly on 13 October 1940 Pauline Ursula Mellowes (London, 15 October 1921 – Potten End, Hertfordshire, 10 January 1967), daughter of Frank Wilford Mellowes (Sheffield, 17 April 1875 – London, 10 October 1940) and Doris née Watts. They had three children:

- Lady Sorrel Deidre Bentinck (born 22 February 1942), married Sir John Lister-Kaye, 8th Bart, OBE, having issue.
- Lady Anna Cecilia Bentinck (born 18 May 1947).
- Timothy Charles Robert Noel Bentinck, 12th Earl of Portland, MBE (born 1 June 1953), an actor known for his long-running role as David Archer in the BBC Radio 4 series The Archers.

In 1974 he married secondly Jenifer Hopkins (1936–2016), styled Countess of Portland (from 1990).

== Noble titles ==
Lord Portland descended from William Bentinck, 1st Count Bentinck, a younger son of William Bentinck, 1st Earl of Portland, and a half-brother of Henry Bentinck, 1st Duke of Portland.

Upon the death of his cousin, Graaf Adriaan van Aldenburg Bentinck (1887–1968), when the Dutch side of the family died out, he succeeded as 7th Count Bentinck. The title of Graf Bentinck was created by the Holy Roman Emperor in 1732 being approved in 1886 by Royal Licence for United Kingdom usage with the style of Count.

When in 1990, his distant cousin the 9th Duke of Portland died without an heir to the dukedom, the earldom of Portland devolved upon him via his descent from the 1st Earl.

One of the last generation of hereditary peers to sit in the House of Lords by inheritance, Lord Portland's maiden speech in the Lords in January 1993 was on the 9th Report of the European Communities Committee on the Implementation and Enforcement of Environmental Legislation, when he spoke for restrained urban and population growth on ecological grounds.

== Arms ==
Coat of arms of Henry Bentinck, 11th Earl of Portland
Crest Out of an earl's coronet proper two arms counter-embowed vested gules, on the hands gloves or, each holding an ostrich feather argent. Escutcheon Azure, a cross moline argent. Supporters Two lions double queued, the dexter or, the sinister sable. Motto Craignez Honte (Fear Dishonour).

== See also ==
- Bentinck family

Peerage of England
Preceded by Victor Cavendish-Bentinck; 9th Duke of Portland	Earl of Portland; 1990–1997	Succeeded by Tim Bentinck
German nobility of the Holy Roman Empire
Preceded by Adriaan van Aldenburg Bentinck	Count Bentinck; 1968–1997	Succeeded by Tim Bentinck
