= Tim Bentinck =

British actor and writer (born 1953)

The Right Honourable The Earl of Portland MBE
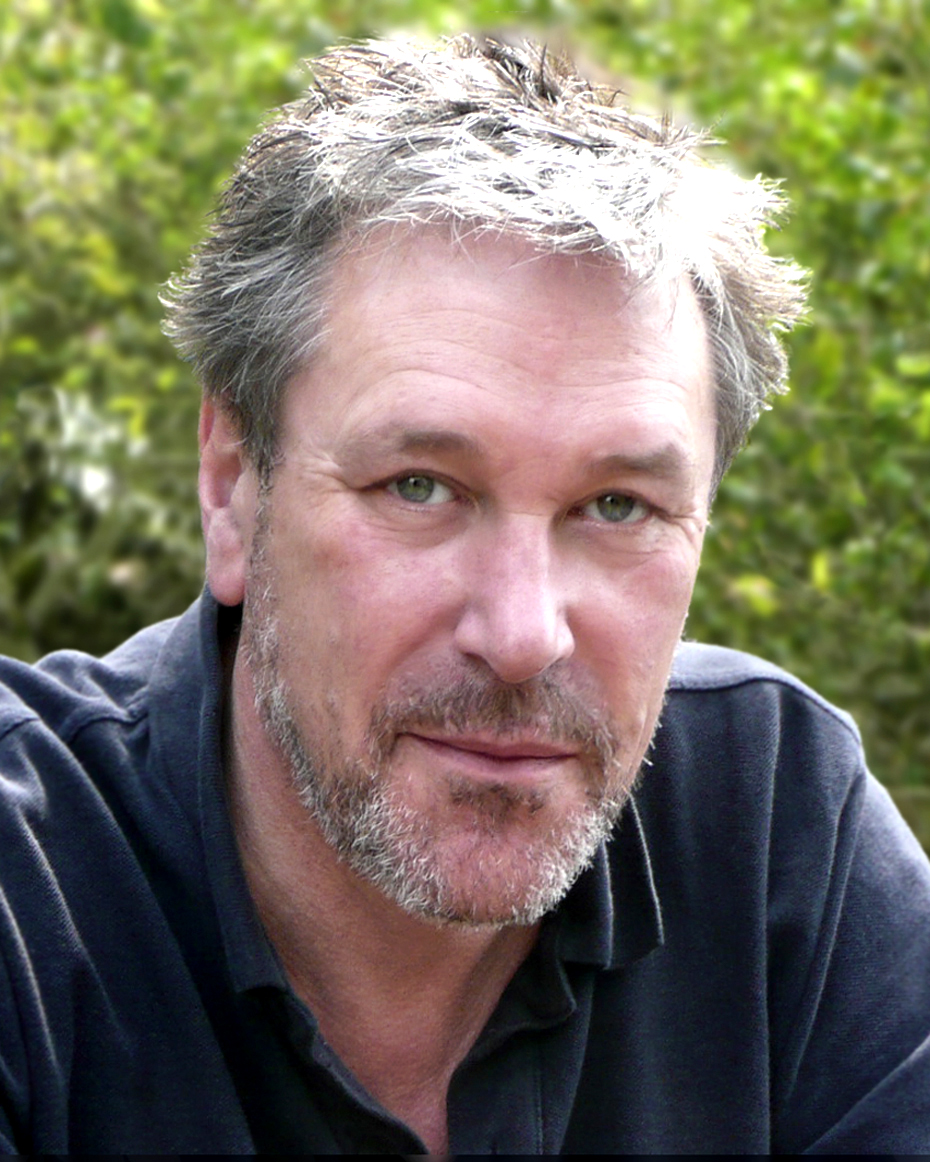
- Bentinck in 2012
- Born: Timothy Charles Robert Noel Bentinck; 1 June 1953 (age 73); Barton, Tasmania, Australia
- Citizenship: Australia; United Kingdom
- Education: Bristol Old Vic Theatre School; University of East Anglia
- Occupations: Actor; writer
- Notable work: The Archers
- Spouse: Judith Emerson (m. 1979)
- Children: 2, including Will Bentinck
- Father: Henry Bentinck

Member of the House of Lords
- Lord Temporal
- Hereditary peerage 30 January 1997 – 11 November 1999
- Preceded by: 11th Earl of Portland
- Succeeded by: Seat abolished

Timothy Charles Robert Noel Bentinck, 12th Earl of Portland, Count Bentinck (born 1 June 1953), known professionally as Tim Bentinck, is an Australian-born British actor, writer, and peer, known for his long-running role as David Archer in the BBC Radio 4 series The Archers.

As the Earl of Portland, Bentinck was a member of the House of Lords from 1997 to 1999. He is also the Count Bentinck in the peerage of the Holy Roman Empire.

== Early life ==
The son of the non-conformist intellectual Henry Bentinck, Bentinck was born on a sheep station in Barton, Tasmania, Australia, but moved with his family to Berkhamsted in England at the age of two. He was educated at a prep school, then Harrow School, and finally at the University of East Anglia, where he spent much of his time on productions of its drama society, before receiving a BA degree in the History of Art. After graduation, he trained in acting at the Bristol Old Vic Theatre School.

== Career ==
Bentinck has been an actor since 1978 and is known for the roles of David Archer in the BBC Radio 4 series The Archers and Tom Lacey in the BBC TV drama series By the Sword Divided (1983–85). He is also a voice-over artist, having provided the voice of James Bond for the video-game The World Is Not Enough (Nintendo 64 and PlayStation version), and the voice of Roger Radcliffe in 101 Dalmatians II: Patch's London Adventure. Between 1990 and 2006 he was also the voice of "Mind The Gap" on the London Underground Piccadilly line. Bentinck has a long list of theatre, television and film credits. He appeared in The Thick of It in 2005 and 2007 and starred with David Jason in The Royal Bodyguard in 2012.

As himself, Bentinck has appeared on Call My Bluff, won a round of University Challenge, appeared on Celebrity Mastermind and Pointless Celebrities, and beaten Judith Keppel on science in Celebrity Eggheads.

Bentinck has revoiced Gérard Depardieu in the film Nouvelle France, and Chow Yun Fat in Crouching Tiger, Hidden Dragon. He has provided post-production voices for many major US and UK film and television productions since helping provide the voices of both Scottish and English armies alongside Mel Gibson in Braveheart.

His first film role was as 'Harris', Roger Moore's lieutenant in North Sea Hijack; other film roles include William Goldman's The Year of the Comet, the western, The Pride of Wade Ellison as well as the short film, Locked Up by Bugsy Riverbank Steel – winner of Best Foreign Short Film at the Lanzarote Film Festival in 2013. Also Fast Girls, The Redistributors, Rule Number Three with Nicholas Hoult, The Pirates of Penzance with Kevin Kline, Trevor Nunn's Twelfth Night, Vanity Fair, the U-boat commander in Enigma, Fantastic Beasts and Where to Find Them, and many short and student films. In 2018 he starred with Jack Roth as Conrad in the Netflix movie, Us And Them. He played the role of Frederick Forsyth in the BBC television film Reg (2016).

On stage, after many London fringe theatre appearances, Bentinck starred as the Pirate King in The Pirates of Penzance at the Theatre Royal, Drury Lane in 1982, as Captain Brice in Arcadia at the Theatre Royal, Haymarket, and as Hubert Laurie in Night Must Fall, also at the Haymarket. Bentinck toured a one-man show, Love Your Chocolates, – a mixture of stories, comedy songs and multi-media, and played Frank in Educating Rita at the Watermill Theatre, Newbury, Berkshire, in 2009.

Bentinck regularly writes travel articles for The Mail on Sunday and his book, Avant Garde A Clue, co-written with Albert Welling, is published on Kindle. In March 2015, his children's book, Colin The Campervan, was published by FBS Publishing.

Bentinck's autobiography Being David Archer – And Other Unusual Ways of Earning a Living was published by Constable in 2017.

Bentinck has made many guest appearances in Big Finish audio dramas, including audio productions based on Doctor Who, Torchwood, Blake's 7 and Space 1999. He has also narrated over sixty audiobooks.

In the 2018 Queen's Birthday Honours, he was appointed Member of the Order of the British Empire (MBE) for services to drama.

Bentinck is also an inventor with several patents to his name, as well as a programmer/web site designer, musician and writer.

== Filmography ==
=== Television ===
Bentinck's roles on television include:

- The Nevers
- Gentleman Jack
- Flack
- The Game
- The Politician's Husband
- The Royal Bodyguard
- Tales of the Unexpected (The Stinker)
- Twenty Twelve
- The Thick of It
- Doctors
- Broken News
- Shadow Play
- Sharpe's Rifles
- The Armando Iannucci Shows
- A Prince Among Men
- Grange Hill
- Made in Heaven
- Square Deal
- By the Sword Divided
- EastEnders
- Silent Witness
- The Crown

=== Video games ===
Bentinck has also done voicework for numerous videogame titles:

- The Feeble Files
- The World Is Not Enough
- 007 Racing
- Prisoner of War
- Secret Weapons Over Normandy
- James Bond 007: Everything or Nothing
- Knights of Honor
- Medieval II: Total War
- Heavenly Sword
- Hellgate: London
- Viking: Battle for Asgard
- Rhodan: Myth of the Illochim
- Memento Mori
- Divinity II
- Venetica
- Dragon Age II
- Star Wars: The Old Republic
- The Book of Unwritten Tales
- Deponia
- Risen 2: Dark Waters
- The Secret World
- The Night of the Rabbit
- The Raven: Legacy of a Master Thief
- Total War: Rome II
- The Dark Eye: Demonicon
- Broken Sword 5: The Serpent's Curse
- Blackguards
- Dark Souls II
- Lego The Hobbit
- Grid Autosport
- Sacred 3
- Risen 3: Titan Lords
- Dreamfall Chapters
- The Book of Unwritten Tales 2
- Warhammer: End Times – Vermintide
- Deponia Doomsday
- Dark Souls III
- Total War: Warhammer
- Lego Marvel Super Heroes 2
- Warhammer: Vermintide 2
- Anno 1800
- The Lord of the Rings: Gollum

== Titles ==
On the death of the 9th Duke of Portland in 1990, Bentinck's father Henry, his sixth cousin, succeeded to the earldom of Portland. In 1997 Tim succeeded his father. He took a seat in certain sittings of the House of Lords but made no speeches (nor ask any questions) before losing the right to remain due to the House of Lords Act 1999. He did not stand for election under the 1999 Act.

On 29 December 1732, the Hon. William Bentinck, Baron Bentinck of the Duchy of Guelders (second surviving son of Hans Willem Bentinck), was made a Count of the Holy Roman Empire as Count (Graf) Bentinck, by Imperial Letters Patent of Ferdinand I, Holy Roman Emperor. This title also vests in Timothy Bentinck. Under a Royal Warrant of 27 April 1932 on Foreign Titles, the dispensation granted by Queen Victoria to use the title and daughters' styles socially in Great Britain was rescinded beyond any living heirs, the last of whom were Bentinck's late father and aunt.

== Personal life ==
Bentinck married the milliner Judith "Judy" Ann Emerson (born Newcastle-under-Lyme, 10 October 1952) in London on 8 September 1979. They have two sons: Will Bentinck, Viscount Woodstock (born London, 19 May 1984) and The Hon. Jasper James Mellowes Bentinck (born London, 12 June 1988). They reside in London.

== Arms ==
Coat of arms of Tim Bentinck
Crest Out of an earl's coronet proper two arms counter-embowed vested gules, on the hands gloves or, each holding an ostrich feather argent. Escutcheon Azure, a cross moline argent. Supporters Two lions double queued, the dexter or, the sinister sable. Motto Craignez Honte (Fear Dishonour).

Peerage of England
Preceded by Henry Bentinck	Earl of Portland; 1997–present Member of the House of Lords (1997–1999)	Incumbent
German nobility of the Holy Roman Empire
Preceded by Henry Bentinck	Count Bentinck; 1997–present	Incumbent
