= Charlotte Sophie of Aldenburg =

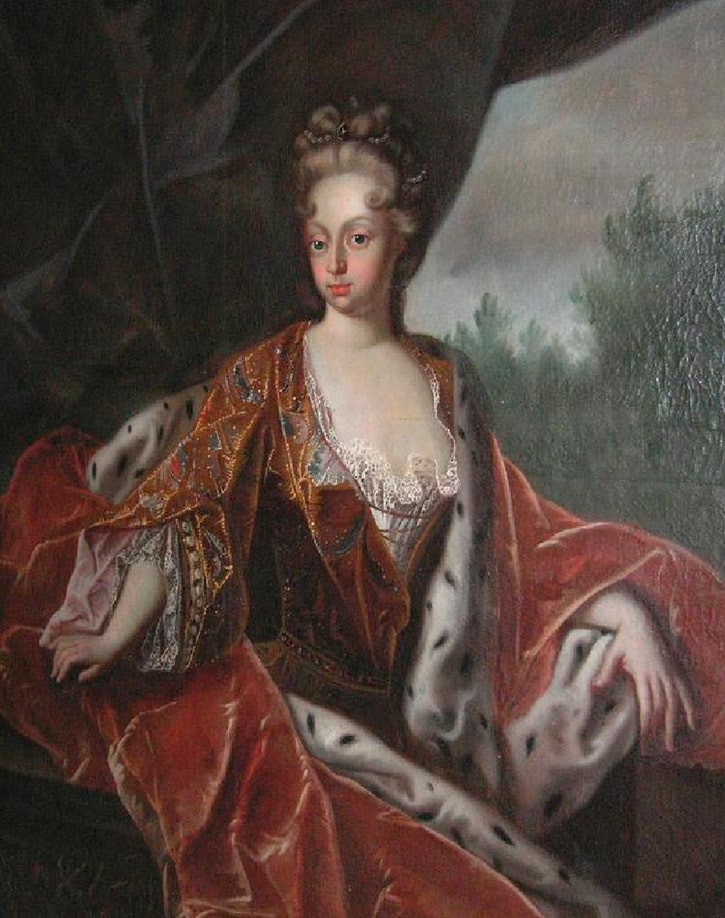
Portrait of Countess Charlotte Sophie of Bentinck, née Countesss of Aldenburg (1715–1800), painted by an unidentified painter, circa 1740

Charlotte Sophie of Aldenburg (4 August 1715 – 5 February 1800), was the ruling Countess of Varel and Kniphausen, adjacent lordships on the German/Frisian border along the North Sea, from 1738 to 1748.

== Life ==
=== Background ===
Charlotte Amalie was the daughter and only child of Anton II, Count of Aldenburg (1681-1738) and by his second wife, Princess Wilhelmine Marie of Hesse-Homburg (1678-1770). She was the last of the Aldenburgs who were, in turn, an illegitimate line of the House of Oldenburg, descended from Anton Gunther (1583-1667), the last of the independent Counts of Oldenburg. His main domains, Oldenburg and Delmenhorst, were inherited on his death by Frederick II of Denmark, head of the senior, legitimate branch of the House of Oldenburg. Leaving no children by his consort, an Oldenburg princess of the Danish Sonderburg line, Anton Gunther was free to confer his unentailed lordships of Varel and Kniphausen on Anton I of Aldenburg (1633-1681), the son of his long-time liaison with Baroness Elisabeth Margareta Ungnad zu Sonnegg (c.1605-1683), for whom he also procured the rank of Imperial count in 1653. Although Anton's daughters by his first wife, Countess Auguste Johanna zu Sayn-Wittgenstein-Hohenstein (1638-1669) married into the Scandinavian nobility, his second marriage was to Princess Charlotte Amélie de la Trémoïlle (1652-1732), a Huguenot princesse étrangère whose descent from the Dutch leader, William the Silent, would eventually bring the Aldenburgs within the orbit of their powerful neighbors to the south, the House of Orange-Nassau.

=== Marriage ===
Count Anton II (1681-1738), the last male of his line, left his domains to his only child, Charlotte Sophie. The family being under the influence of the Dutch Prince of Orange, who had become William III of England in 1688, it was thought desirable to marry the heiress to a liege man whose family, the House of Bentinck, had been part of the entourage which accompanied the conqueror from the Netherlands to London in 1688. However, as the bride was a ruling countess, it was thought necessary that the selected groom, William Bentinck, younger son of the first Earl of Portland, needed to have commensurate rank, whereas legally a peer's son was a commoner. So on 29 December 1732 the Holy Roman Emperor obligingly elevated Bentinck to the rank of Imperial count, and he married Countess Charlotte Sophie von Aldenburg zu Varel und Knyphausen on 1 March 1733.

=== Reign ===
Charlotte Sophie inherited the throne from her father in 1738. She had two sons within her marriage: Count Christian Friedrich Anton (1734-1768) and (the British naval officer and mechanical inventor) Count John Bentinck (1737-1775). However, she lived from 1737 to 1748 in a relationship with Count Albrecht Wolfgang of Schaumburg-Lippe (1699-1748), which caused a great scandal in contemporary Germany, and prevented her from having contact with her sons, although she would also have a son, Baron Karl Wilhelm Wolfgang von Donop (1740-1813), with her lover in 1740.

=== Later life ===
In 1748, she was deposed as ruler of Varel and Delmenhorst, legal control of which territories was transferred to her former husband as guardian of their sons. She made many visits to the courts of Europe seeking support to retake her lands, but was treated as an outcast. In 1767, she took up residence in Hamburg, where she lived in retirement with her natural son.

== Legacy ==
She is portrayed in the film Charlotte Sophie Bentinck.
