= Will Bentinck =

English entrepreneur (born 1984)

- Viscount Woodstock
- Born: William Jack Henry Bentinck; 19 May 1984 (age 42); Islington, London, UK
- Noble family: Bentinck
- Spouse: Rebecca Newton (m. 2021)
- Father: The 12th Earl of Portland
- Occupation: entrepreneur

William Jack Henry Bentinck, Viscount Woodstock, Graf Bentinck (born 19 May 1984), known as Will Bentinck, is a British aristocrat, social entrepreneur and speaker.

== Background and education ==
The elder son of the actor Tim Bentinck, and couture milliner Judith ("Judy") Ann Emerson, he was accorded the courtesy style of Viscount Woodstock upon his father inheriting the earldom of Portland.

Bentinck attended Harrow School before going up to read philosophy at Heythrop College, London, graduating BA with first-class honours in 2010.

== Career ==
After graduating from London University, Bentinck co-founded The Ragged University, a free service offering peer-to-peer educational events inspired by the 19th-century English ragged schools. Later in 2010, Bentinck co-founded Levantine Links, a nonprofit organisation recruiting UK graduates to provide English language programmes serving children and adults in Al-Hasakah, Syria, in collaboration with the Syriac Orthodox Church.

In March 2012, Bentinck was named a Vodafone Foundation 'World of Difference' winner, receiving funding for an internship with Ashoka, a fellowship of some of the world's leading social entrepreneurs.

In 2012, Bentinck joined Enternships, set up by Rajeeb Dey. He spoke at TEDxSquareMile, and is a course leader for the Accelerator Academy, Since 2014 Bentinck has been a Tech London Advocate as head of careers at Makers Academy and Head of B2C Sales.

== Personal life ==
He is married to Rebecca.

== See also ==
- Courtesy titles
- Earl of Portland
