= Donald Gainer =

British diplomat (1891–1966)

Sir Donald Gainer GBE KCMG (18 October 1891 – 30 July 1966) was a British diplomat who was successively Ambassador to Venezuela, Brazil and Poland.

== Career ==
Donald St Clair Gainer was educated at Charterhouse and then in Germany and France. He joined the British Consular Service in 1915 and was vice-consul successively in several towns in Norway (Narvik, Vardø, Christianssand, Tromsø, Bergen), then in Havana where he was chargé d'affaires between ambassadors. After serving at Rotterdam and Munich he was sent in 1929 to set up a new consular post at Breslau (now Wrocław, western Poland). He was Consul-General in Mexico 1931–32, then at Munich 1932–38 and Vienna 1938–39. The German government (which annexed Austria in 1938) expelled Gainer in 1939 in a tit-for-tat reprisal for the expulsion of the German consul at Liverpool.

Gainer was appointed Minister to Venezuela in 1939 and promoted to Ambassador in 1944. A few weeks later he was appointed ambassador to Brazil. He left Brazil in 1947 to a complimentary column from The Times correspondent in Rio de Janeiro and transferred to be ambassador to Poland. His final post was Permanent Under-Secretary (PUS) in charge of the German section at the Foreign Office 1950–51 (normally the PUS is the civil servant in charge of the Foreign Office, but at this time the German section was so important that its head had PUS rank).

Gainer retired from the Foreign Office in 1951 and was chief executive of the International Road Federation 1951–57. He was chairman of the Anglo-Brazilian Society 1955–64. Sir D.St.Clair Gainer is finely drawn by Patrick-Leigh Fermor as the British consul in Munich who bailed him out with a new passport - to replace the one which was stolen - and a five-pound note, returned a year later by Leigh-Fermor from Constantinople.

== Honours ==
Gainer was appointed OBE in the 1934 Birthday Honours and CMG in the 1937 Coronation Honours. He was knighted KCMG in the 1944 Birthday Honours on his appointment to Brazil and given the additional, senior knighthood of GBE in the 1950 New Year Honours.

Diplomatic posts
Preceded by Sir Ernest Gye	Envoy Extraordinary and Minister Plenipotentiary to the United States of Venezuela then Ambassador Extraordinary and Plenipotentiary at Caracas; 1939–1944	Succeeded by Sir George Ogilvie-Forbes
Preceded by Sir Noel Charles	Ambassador Extraordinary and Plenipotentiary at Rio de Janeiro; 1944–1947	Succeeded by Sir Nevile Butler
Preceded by Victor Cavendish-Bentinck	Ambassador Extraordinary and Plenipotentiary at Warsaw; 1947–1950	Succeeded by Sir Charles Bateman
