= William Bentinck (Royal Navy officer) =

Vice-Admiral William Bentinck FRS
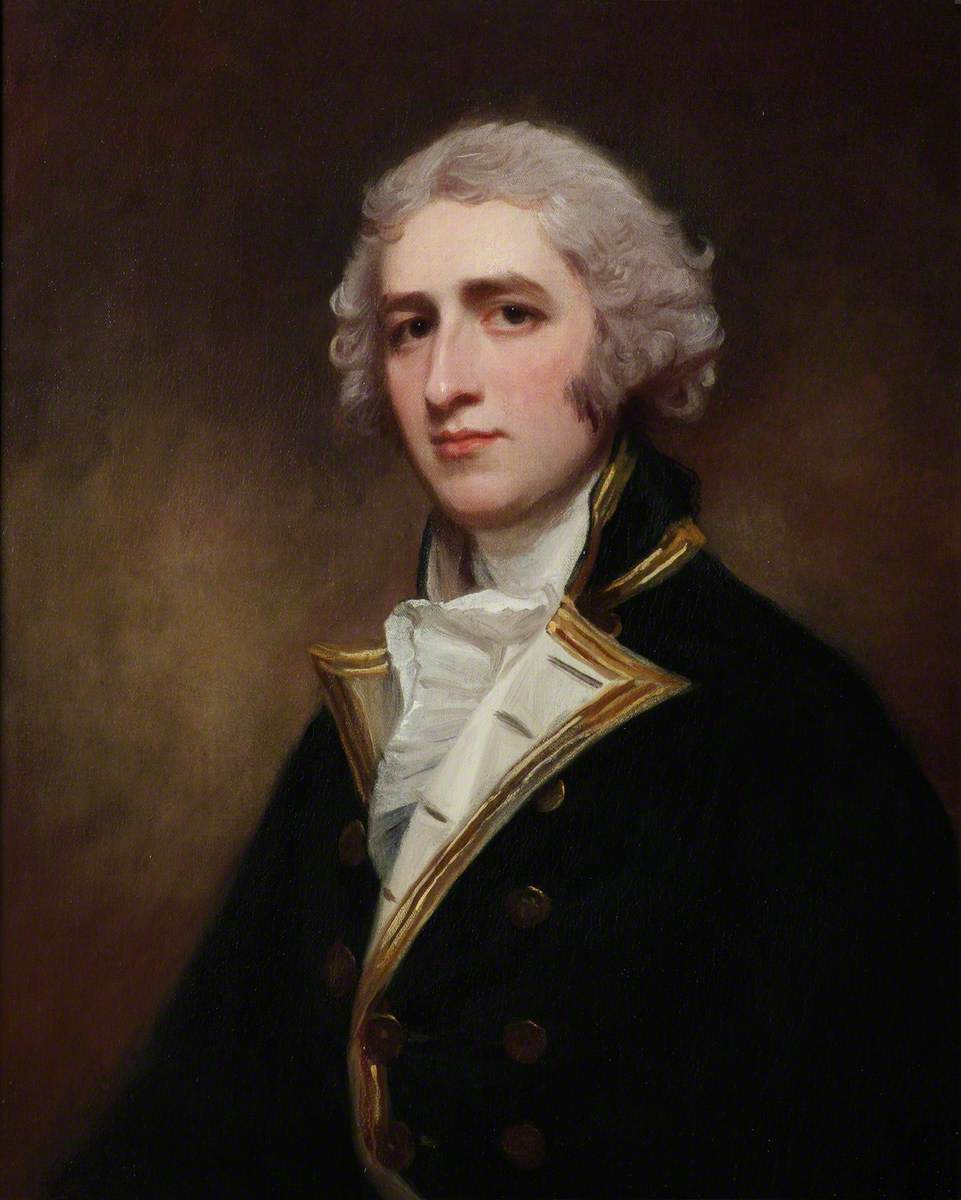

Governor of Saint Vincent
- In office 1798–1799
- Monarch: George III
- Preceded by: James Seton
- Succeeded by: Drewry Ottley

Personal details
- Born: 17 June 1764
- Died: 21 February 1813 (aged 48) Saint Petersburg, Russia

Military service
- Allegiance: Britain
- Branch/service: Royal Navy
- Years of service: 1783–1813
- Rank: Vice-Admiral of the Blue
- Commands: HMS Assistance; HMS Adamant; HMS Phaeton; HMS Tremendous
- Battles/wars: American Revolutionary War; French Revolutionary Wars; Glorious First of June; Napoleonic Wars

Vice-Admiral William Bentinck FRS (17 June 1764 – 21 February 1813) was a Royal Navy officer and colonial administrator who served as the governor of Saint Vincent from 1798 to 1799. During his long career in the navy, he eventually rose to the rank of Vice-Admiral of the Blue.

== Family ==
His father was John Bentinck, a captain in the navy, and his mother was Renira van Tuyll van Serooskerken. John's mother and thus William's grandmother was Charlotte Sophie of Aldenburg, the ruler of Aldenburg 1738–1748. She was the cousin to the mother of Catherine the Great and had good connections to the Russian court. Probably William also had a good relation with Duke George of Oldenburg who was referred to as a prince in Russia.

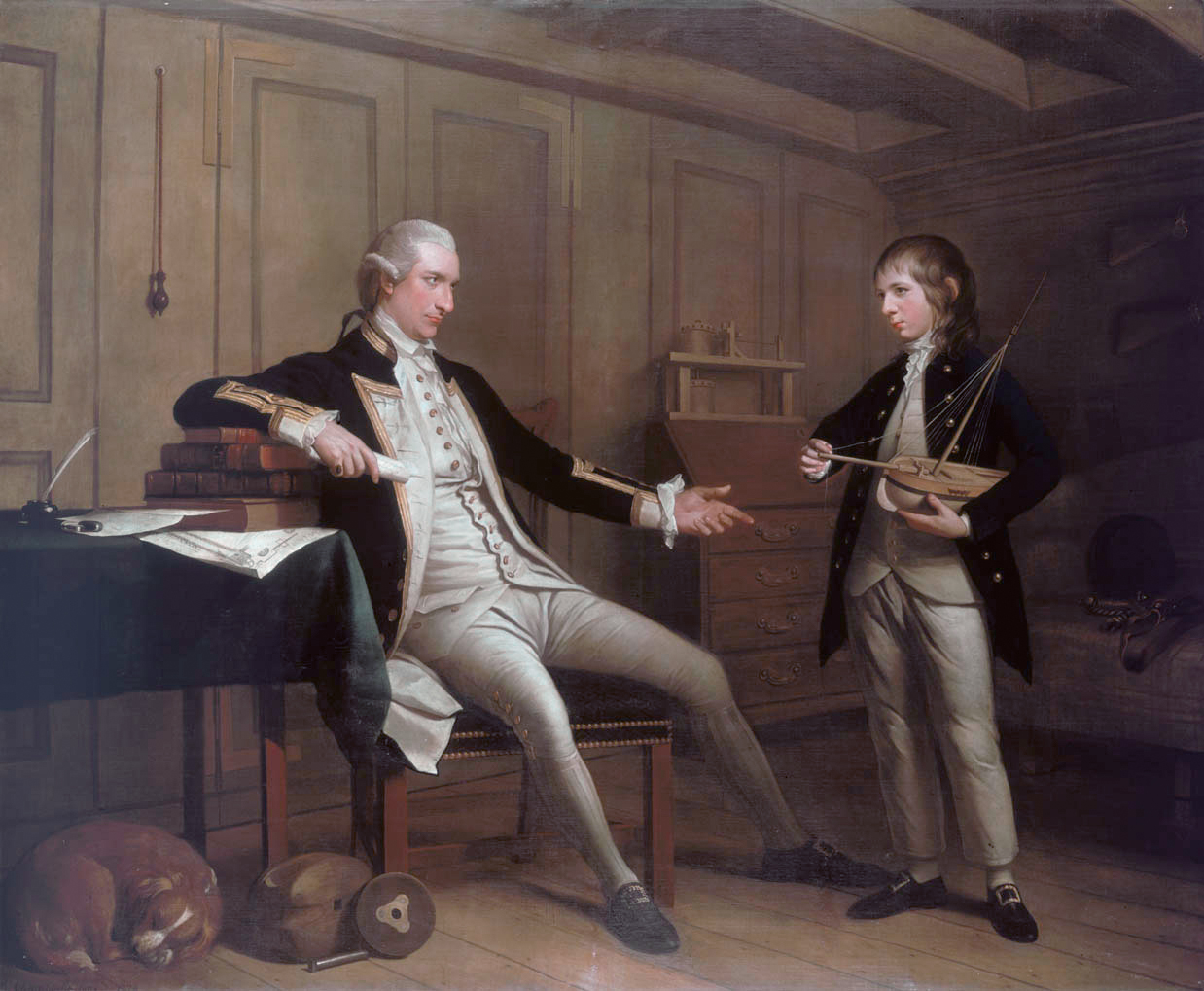
Captain John Bentinck (1737–1775) and his son, William Bentinck (1764–1813), by Mason Chamberlin.

He married Frances Augusta Pierrepont in 1802 and together they had eight children, but only four survived to adult age. His oldest son George Bentinck (1803–1886) became an MP.

== Naval service ==
At the age of nineteen he was given the command of the 50-gun Assistance (September 1783 to January 1784) during the end of the American War of Independence. Shortly after the peace with USA, a part of the crew deserted and escaped to land on Sandy Hook. A cutter was sent after them but they ran aground on a salt march and the crew together with its commander Hamilton Halyburton died of exposure to the cold. Logbooks written by Bentinck has been preserved from a journey with Atalanta from Halifax, Nova Scotia, to Charlottetown, Prince Edward Island, July–August, 1784. A journey is also documented with Felicity from Halifax to Cape Breton Island in 1784, conveying Governor of Cape Breton Island Joseph DesBarres and his suite. In the War of the First Coalition he was first given the command of Adamant (April 1793 to spring 1794) and later the command of the frigate Phaeton (Spring 1794 to August 1794). With this ship he participated in the battle of the Glorious First of June against the French navy. Shortly after the battle he was transferred to the 74-gun Tremendous (July 1794 to March 1795). Copies of two logbooks, 1790–1791, property of Timothy Bentinck, are held at the University of Nottingham.

He was elected a Fellow of the Royal Society in 1787.

== Later career ==
=== Governor of St. Vincent and the Grenadines ===
He was the Governor of St. Vincent and the Grenadines during the years 1798–1799. During this time he made some journeys as a partial log exists with sailing instructions for a number of North American and West Indian harbours, February–July 1800, written by Bentinck.

=== Promotion to admiral ===
In spring 1799, he suffered a paralytic stroke that left him unable to speak or fully use his limbs. He moved back to England, hoping the temperate climate would aid his recovery. In 1802, he married Frances Augusta Pierrepont. In 1805 he was commanding the Sea Fencibles from Cromer to Fosdyke Wash which was close to his estate. The Sea Fencibles was a coastal defence force that would defend against any invasion from France. During the following years he was rapidly promoted first to Rear-Admiral of the Blue in 1805, then Rear-Admiral of the White in 1808 and finally Vice-Admiral of the Blue in 1810. Little is known about his commands during these years.

=== Peace negotiations with Sweden and Russia 1812 ===
The Treaty of Orebro on 18 July 1812 marked the end of both the Anglo-Russian and the Anglo-Swedish Wars. The French military was at the same time advancing into Russia and it was necessary to end the wars and instead create a united front against France and its allies. Bentinck had family connections in the Russian court and he also seems to have had a good relation to the Swedish Crown Prince Carl Johan Bernadotte. He made several journeys between Saint Petersburg and Stockholm. He took initiative to the meeting in August at the city of Åbo between Tsar Alexander I and the Swedish Crown Prince Bernadotte.

It is not known if he had a mission from the British government or if he acted on his own. The American ambassador in Saint Petersburg, John Quincy Adams wrote to the Secretary of State James Monroe in August 1812:

"A circumstance not a little extraordinary is, that the conclusion of peace with England, if accomplished, has not yet been made public. An Admiral Bentinck was at the Emperor Alexander's headquarters, dispatched, it is said, by Admiral Saumarez from the British Fleet in the Baltic, to which he has again returned. All the prohibitions against the admission of English vessels, and of vessels from England still subsist in form, and no vessels have yet entered at Cronstadt directly from an English port; or cleared from Cronstadt to an English port. At Archangel, I am informed by Mr. Hazard, that vessels entering from English ports have been admitted."

He died shortly afterwards of typhus in Saint Petersburg on 21 February 1813.
