= Henry Bentinck (British Army officer) =

British soldier and courtier (1796–1878)

General Sir Henry Bentinck KCB
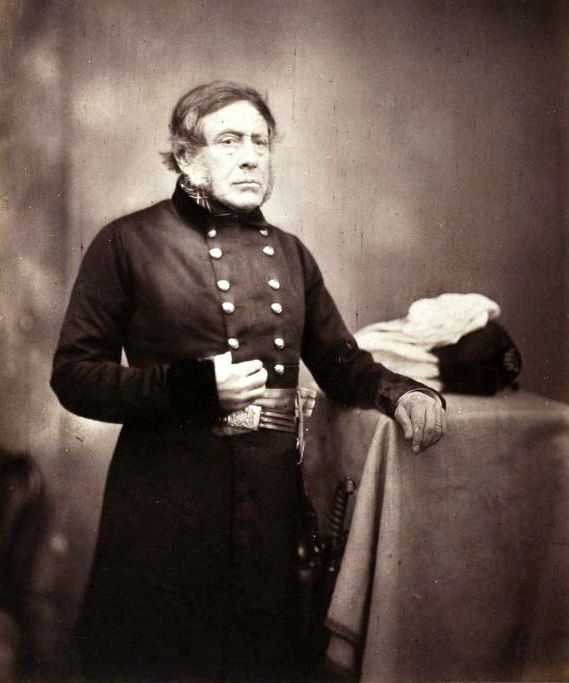
- Bentinck in the Crimea, 1855
- Born: 8 September 1796
- Died: 29 September 1878 (aged 82)
- Occupation: Soldier

General Sir Henry John William Bentinck KCB (8 September 1796 – 29 September 1878) was a British soldier and courtier.

== Background ==
He was the third and youngest son of Major-General John Charles Bentinck and his wife Jemima Helena, eldest daughter of Frederick de Ginkell, 6th Earl of Athlone. His older brothers were the generals William Bentinck, 3rd Count Bentinck and Charles Bentinck, 4th Count Bentinck.

== Early career ==
Bentinck entered the British Army as ensign in March 1813 and was commissioned into the Coldstream Guards. He rose to lieutenant in 1820 and to captain nine years thereafter. In 1841, he was appointed an aide-de-camp to Queen Victoria with the rank of an brevet-colonel. Bentinck was promoted to major in 1846 and five years later he purchased a lieutenant-colonelship.

== Crimean war ==
With the begin of the Baltic Campaign of 1854, he was transferred with his regiment to the Crimea and in June 1854 he was advanced to a major-general. Bentinck fought in the Battle of Alma in September of the latter year and having received command of the 28th (North Gloucestershire) Regiment of Foot in the Battle of Balaclava on 25 October. A month later, he was shot in the arm in the Battle of Inkerman and then took part in the Siege of Sevastopol with the second division. Following the death of Sir George Cathcart, he was attached to the fourth division, however aftereffects of his wound delayed his accession until June 1855.

== Later life ==
After his return to England he was awarded a Knight Commander of the Order of the Bath and a Commandeur of the French Légion d'honneur for his services in Russia. He was decorated with the Crimea Medal with four clasps and with the Sardinian Medal. In 1858, Bentinck obtained the 2nd class of the Turkish Order of the Medjidie. Bentinck was nominated Groom in Waiting in Ordinary to the Queen in 1859, a post he held for the next eight years. In 1860, he was promoted to lieutenant-general and in 1865, he received a commission as honorary colonel of the 1st London Artillery Volunteer Corps. He was made a full general in December 1867 and finally retired after another decade in service.

== Family ==
In 1829, he married his distant cousin Renira Antoinette, the daughter of Admiral James Hawkins Whitshed. By her mother Sophia Henrietta, the daughter of John Albert Bentinck, she was just as her husband a descendant of William Bentinck, 1st Earl of Portland. Their marriage was childless. Bentinck died at Grosvenor Street in London on 29 September 1878, aged 82 and was buried at Kensal Green Cemetery. His wife survived him for eleven years.

Military offices
Preceded by John Duffy	Colonel of the 28th (North Gloucestershire) Regiment of Foot; 1854 – 1878	Succeeded by Thomas Brooke
New office	Honorary Colonel of the 1st London Artillery Volunteer Corps; 1865 – 1868	Succeeded by The Duke of Edinburgh
Court offices
Preceded by Sir Frederick Stovin	Groom in Waiting in Ordinary; 1859 – 1867	Succeeded by Francis Seymour
