= Judy Bentinck =

English couture milliner

Judith Ann Bentinck, Countess of Portland, Countess Bentinck und Waldeck Limpurg (née Emerson; born 10 October 1952 in Newcastle-Under-Lyme) is a couture milliner based in Central London. She is married to fellow actor Tim Bentinck, Earl of Portland.

== Background and education ==
She was born to John Robert Emerson (Weardale, County Durham, 1920–1994) and wife Mary Elizabeth Graham (Chester, Cheshire, 1922–).

She attended Alleyne’s School (later Alleyne's High School), Stone, Staffordshire. She gained a BA in printed textiles at Liverpool College of Art, then later moved into the world of costume design, working for the RSC, the BBC and the Royal Opera House and teaching at the Bristol Old Vic Theatre School where she met her future husband.

Bentinck trained with the milliner Rose Cory.

== Career ==
Portland Hats was started in 2002 and re-branded in 2004 to Judy Bentinck Millinery. Working at Cockpit Arts Studios in Holborn, Bentinck creates a Spring/Summer and an Autumn/Winter Collection each year, but the majority of her work is bespoke, by commission.

Bentinck teaches millinery through Cockpit Arts Studios and Central Saint Martins.

== Family ==
The former Judy Emerson married the actor Tim Bentinck, who later became 12th Earl of Portland, in London on 8 September 1979; the couple has two sons:

- William Jack Henry Bentinck, Viscount Woodstock (b. Highgate, 19 May 1984)
- The Hon. Jasper James Mellowes Bentinck (b. London, 12 June 1988)
