= John Bentinck =

Royal Navy officer, inventor and politician

Captain John Bentinck FRS
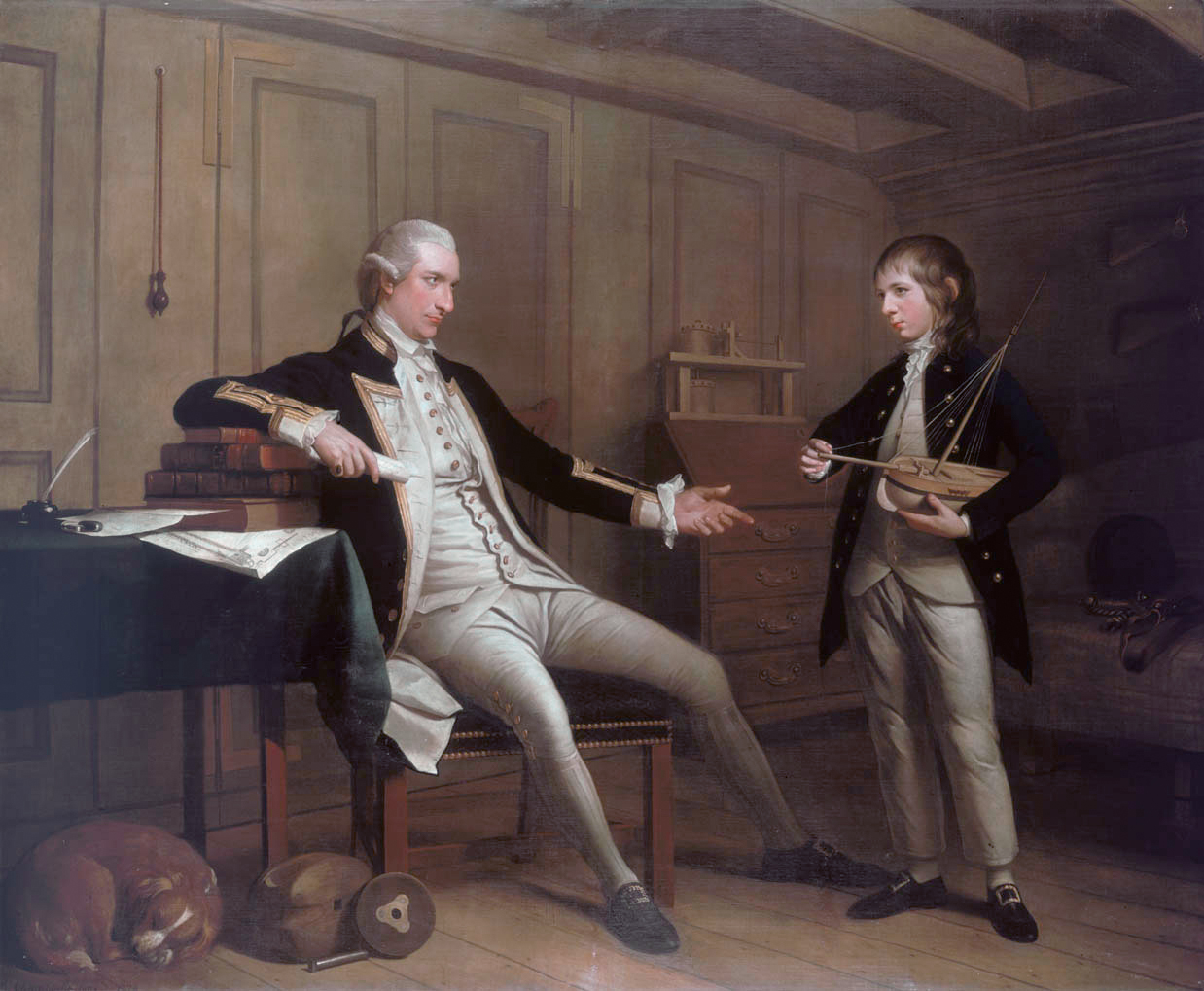
- Captain John Bentinck (1737–1775) and his son, William Bentinck (1764–1813)
- Born: 29 December 1737
- Died: 23 September 1775 (aged 37)
- Relatives: William Bentinck (son)
- Military career
- Allegiance: Great Britain
- Branch: Royal Navy
- Service years: 1752 – 1773
- Rank: Captain
- Commands: HMS Fly; HMS Dover; HMS Niger; HMS Dragon; HMS Centaur
- Conflicts: Seven Years' War

Captain John Albert Bentinck, FRS (29 December 1737 – 23 September 1775) was a Royal Navy officer, inventor and politician who represented Rye in the House of Commons of Great Britain from 1761 to 1768.

== Family background ==
He was a member of the junior branch of the Anglo-Dutch House of Bentinck. His father, William, Count Bentinck, was a younger son of the 1st Earl of Portland, and married Charlotte Sophie, daughter of Anton II, the last Count of Aldenburg. John Albert Bentinck was the second son of this marriage.

== Naval career ==
He entered the Royal Navy at an early age. In August 1752, he was serving as a volunteer on board HMS Centurion, in which vessel he visited Lisbon, but returned in the same year to Leyden, where he remained for some time. In 1753, he was appointed midshipman to HMS Penzance, a fifth-rate of 44 guns, commanded by Captain Hugh Bonfoy, and joined his ship at Plymouth in June of that year to make a voyage in the following July to Newfoundland.

In 1758, Bentinck was present at an engagement in which the British captured the Raisonnable. In the same month, he was appointed to the command of the sloop HMS Fly, and in that vessel took part later in the expedition under Lord Anson to cover the landing of the Duke of Marlborough at St Malo during the Raid on St Malo. He was then for some time stationed with his sloop off Emden, at the time of the capture of Emden, and while there he became involved in an unfortunate misunderstanding, in the course of which he took the extreme step of placing a Captain Angell, his superior officer, under arrest. The affair, however, was cleared up, the accusations against Captain Angell which had prompted his arrest were fully withdrawn, and on 17 October 1758, Bentinck was promoted to be captain of the frigate HMS Dover. In January 1759, being then still on board the Fly, he had to aid in the transport of troops to England, and in March of that year, took up his new command. He did not remain long on the Dover, but was soon removed into the frigate HMS Niger. In this vessel he was employed in 1760 as a cruiser, and distinguished himself highly in an engagement with a French ship of war of very superior weight and armament—the 74-gun Diadème. About a week after this action, in returning from Plymouth, where he had gone to repair damages, he fell in with and captured the Jason, a French privateer carrying 8 guns and 52 men. In the following November, he captured off Morlaix the French corvette Epreuve, carrying 14 guns and 136 men. He remained in the Niger until the end of the war in 1762.

Quitting the Niger on the conclusion of peace, he remained without a commission till 1766. In that year, he was commissioned to the 74-gun HMS Dragon, at Portsmouth, and retained that command for three years. In 1770, he was appointed successor to Captain Robert Hughes in command of the 74-gun HMS Centaur, a guardship at Portsmouth, and held this, his last command, for three years. He died two years later on 23 September 1775.

== Inventor ==
Bentinck had great ingenuity in mechanical pursuits, and effected many useful nautical improvements, especially with regard to ships' pumps. He introduced such important additions and improvements into the chain pump used on board ship as to have gained the credit of its invention. He gave his name to "Bentinck shrouds", which supported the rigging of masts. Next, he invented the "Bentinck boom" which, among other things, made going about much easier. Finally, Bentinck developed a triangular mainsail often used as a storm sail which became known as simply "the Bentinck sail". On 20 June 1765, he was elected a Fellow of the Royal Society.

== Member of Parliament ==
At the general election of 1761 he was elected to parliament for the town of Rye, one of the Cinque Ports, and retained his seat till the dissolution for the 1768 election.

== Personal life ==
Bentinck was a count of the Holy Roman Empire. In 1763 he married Renira van Tuyll van Serooskerken, daughter of Baron de Serooskerken. By her he became the progenitor of a second English line of Bentincks from which the Dukes of Portland, the senior line of the House of Bentinck, were also descended. They had five children; two boys and three girls, their eldest son, William Bentinck (1764–1813), also entered the Navy, and rose to the rank of vice-admiral.

== See also ==
- HMS Bentinck (K314)

== Citations ==
Parliament of Great Britain
Preceded by George Onslow; Phillips Gybbon	Member of Parliament for Rye; 1761–1768; With: Phillips Gybbon to 1762; John Norris from 1762	Succeeded by John Norris; Rose Fuller
