= Lord Frederick Bentinck =

British soldier and politician

Major-General Lord Frederick Cavendish-Bentinck

Member of Parliament for Weobley
- In office 20 February 1816 – 31 December 1824
- Preceded by: William Bathurst
- Succeeded by: Lord Henry Thynne

Member of Parliament for Queenborough
- In office 22 March 1824 – 10 June 1826
- Preceded by: Hon. John Villiers
- Succeeded by: The Lord Downes

Personal details
- Born: 2 November 1781
- Died: 10 February 1828 (aged 46) Rome, Italy
- Party: Tory
- Spouse: Lady Mary Lonsdale
- Children: George Cavendish-Bentinck

Major-General Lord Frederick Cavendish-Bentinck (2 November 1781 – 10 February 1828) known as Lord Frederick Bentinck was a British soldier and politician.

The youngest child and fourth son of William Cavendish-Bentinck, 3rd Duke of Portland and Lady Dorothy Cavendish, Cavendish-Bentinck attended Westminster School before joining the army.

== Military career ==
Entering the British army in 1797 as an ensign in the 32rd Regiment of Foot Bentinck then purchased promotion to lieutenant and subsequently captain in the 24th Light Dragoons. Placed on half-pay Bentinck was attached to the combined Russian and Austrian army in Italy during the War of the Second Coalition during which period he participated in the battles of Novi (1799) and Marengo (1800) as well as being present at the Siege of Alexandria (1801).

Bentinck returned to full duty with the British army as a captain in the 52nd Foot (the 24th Light Dragoons having been disbanded). In March 1804 he purchased a promotion to major in the 45th Foot and a month later purchased promotion to Lieutenant colonel in the 7th Foot. The following year he exchanged his lieutenant colonelcy of the 7th Foot for an appointment as a company commander in the 1st Foot Guards. With the Guards Bentinck served in Sicily, was present at the Battle of Corunna (where his elder brother Lord William Bentinck commanded a brigade in the same division) and took part in the Walcheren Campaign before returning to Spain and Portugal for the remainder of the Peninsular War. Bentinck became Lieutenant colonel commanding the 1st Foot Guards in 1814 (a post he held until 1821) and was promoted to Major-general in 1819. Additionally in 1819 he was appointed Captain-commandant of the Mansfield troop of Volunteer Cavalry. Bentinck's final military appointment was the ceremonial role of Colonel of the Regiment of the 58th Foot.

== Political career ==
Cavendish-Bentinck was approached by his cousin, Thomas Thynne, 2nd Marquess of Bath about becoming a member of parliament (MP) after the conclusion of the Napoleonic Wars. Thynne and his family controlled the pocket borough of Weobley in Herefordshire and on agreeing Bentinck was returned unopposed for Weobley in 1816 succeeding William Bathurst who had been appointed a deputy Teller of the Receipt of the Exchequer. At the 1818 and 1820 general elections Cavendish-Bentinck was again returned unopposed for Weobley.

In 1824 Cavendish-Bentinck vacated his seat at Weobley at the request of the Marquess of Bath and was invited by the Duke of Wellington to become MP for Queenborough on the Isle of Sheppey in Kent. Queenborough was a rotten borough controlled by the interests of the Board of Ordnance which Wellington headed as Master-General of the Ordnance and Cavendish-Bentinck was returned as MP for Queenborough in March 1824. Despite its status as a rotten borough and being much controlled by the Board of Ordnance Queenborough did have independently minded voters and at the 1826 general election Cavendish-Bentinck was voted out of office.

A return to political life was considered through his wife's family, mostly her father William Lowther, 1st Earl of Lonsdale who considered Cavendish-Bentenick for seats at Carlisle and Cockermouth, the latter was considered a pocket borough in Lonsdale's control. However Cavendish-Bentinck fell ill and he made no return to politics.

Cavendish-Bentinck was an infrequent attender in the House of Commons but generally voted Tory along the wishes of his sponsors. He appears never to have spoken in Parliament and Hansard has no contributions by him recorded.

== Personal life ==
Cavendish-Bentinck married Lady Mary Lowther, second daughter of William Lowther, 1st Earl of Lonsdale on 16 September 1820 and they had one son, George Cavendish-Bentinck born 9 July 1821. In 1826 Cavendish-Bentinck became ill with a rectal fissure and on medical advice travelled to Italy to recover but died in Rome on 10 February 1828.
