= Victor Cavendish-Bentinck, 9th Duke of Portland =

British diplomat (1897–1990)

His Grace The Duke of Portland CMG
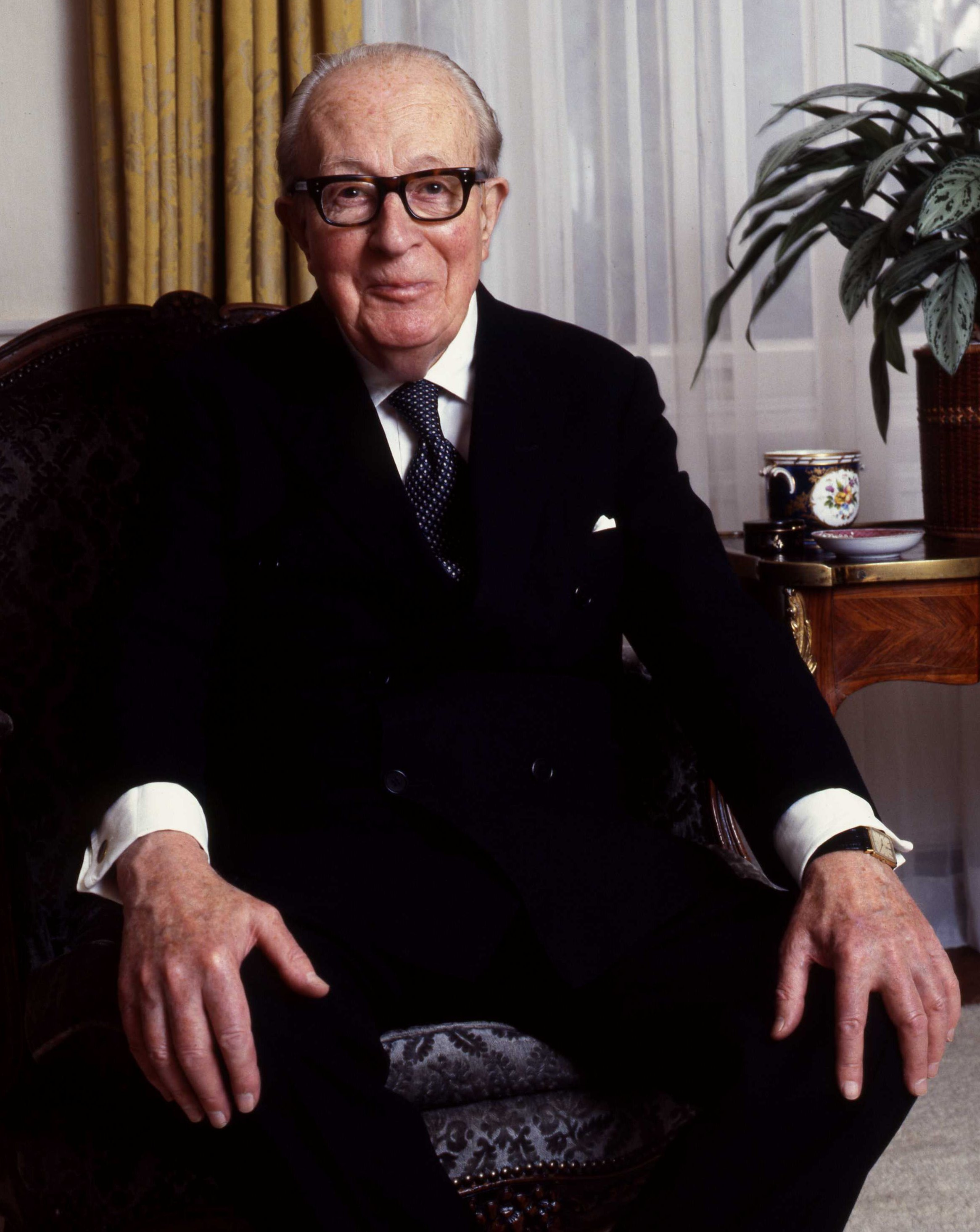
- Cavendish-Bentinck in 1983

British Ambassador to Poland
- In office 1945–1947
- Preceded by: Owen O'Malley
- Succeeded by: Donald Gainer

Chairman of the Joint Intelligence Committee
- In office 1939–1945
- Preceded by: Ralph Stevenson
- Succeeded by: Harold Caccia

Personal details
- Born: Victor Frederick William Cavendish-Bentinck; 18 June 1897 Marylebone, London, England
- Died: 30 July 1990 (aged 93) Chelsea, London, England
- Party: Conservative
- Spouses: Clothilde Bruce Quigley (m. 1924; div. 1948) Kathleen Elsie Barry (m. 1948)
- Children: 3 (see section)
- Education: Wellington College

Victor Frederick William Cavendish-Bentinck, 9th Duke of Portland, CMG (18 June 1897 – 30 July 1990), known as Victor Cavendish-Bentinck until 1977 and Lord Victor Cavendish-Bentinck from 1977 to 1980, and informally as Bill Bentinck, was a British diplomat, businessman, and peer. He served as Chairman of the Joint Intelligence Committee during World War II and British Ambassador to Poland between 1945 and 1947.

== Background and education ==
Cavendish-Bentinck was born in Marylebone, London on 18 June 1897. He was the second son of Frederick Cavendish-Bentinck, whose father, George Cavendish-Bentinck, was a grandson of William Cavendish-Bentinck, 3rd Duke of Portland. Although formally Victor Cavendish-Bentinck he was known informally as Bill. Like other members of his family he dispensed with the name "Cavendish", being known simply as Bill Bentinck. He was educated at Wellington College.

Queen Elizabeth II was also descended from the 3rd Duke of Portland through her maternal grandmother Cecilia Cavendish-Bentinck. Queen Elizabeth and the 9th Duke of Portland were third cousins, once removed.

== Diplomatic career ==
Cavendish-Bentinck did not pursue a university education, instead entering the diplomatic service in 1915 at the age of 18 before taking leave to fight with the Grenadier Guards in the First World War, returning to the Foreign Office in 1919. In 1922, he took charge of administrative arrangements for the Lausanne Conference. He served in the British Embassy in Paris and also in the League of Nations Department in the Foreign Office. Other postings included Athens in 1932 and Santiago in 1933. The high point of his diplomatic career came in 1939 when he was appointed chairman of the Joint Intelligence Committee. He managed to develop the body as a highly effective instrument of government and, as a result, became counsellor to the Services Liaison Department of the Foreign Office in 1942.

However, he cast doubt on reports that were received regarding the Nazi genocide of the Jews. In late August 1943 the Polish Embassy in London informed the British government of the deportation and annihilation of hundreds of thousands of Jews from Lublin and Bialystok provinces. As chairman of the Joint Intelligence Committee, Victor Cavendish-Bentinck hesitated to believe Polish and Jewish information about atrocities. Rather, he viewed the information as an attempt to 'stoke us up.' He added: 'I feel certain that we are making a mistake in giving credence to this gas chamber story.'

In 1945, Cavendish-Bentinck was given his final diplomatic posting on his appointment as Ambassador to Poland. When visiting the formerly German City of Stettin (Szczecin) in 1946 he was invited to talk to German civilians suffering from months of internment so their possessions and property could be taken over by Polish resettlers from territories lost to the USSR. Cavendish-Bentinck refused to do so, ignoring certain inhuman circumstances under which mainly old people, women and children had to suffer, by noting to his Polish hosts, he was "convinced that they will complain as usual".

He held the position for two years before the Foreign Office applied to appoint him Ambassador to Brazil. He never took up the latter post, being obliged to resign from the Foreign Office, without a pension, as a result of the publicity surrounding his divorce. Bentinck's aristocratic background attracted press attention; Foreign Secretary Ernest Bevin, apparently sympathetic, remarked at that the time "I could have saved him if his name had been Smith."

== Later life and Duke of Portland ==
After his withdrawal from the diplomatic service, Cavendish-Bentinck embarked on a business career, becoming Vice-Chairman of the Committee of Industrial Interests in Germany. From this position, he was able to advance the interests of British companies such as Unilever. He was a member of the Steering Committee of the Bilderberg Group.

In 1977 Cavendish-Bentinck's elder brother Ferdinand succeeded their kinsman, William Cavendish-Bentinck, 7th Duke of Portland, in the dukedom, becoming the 8th Duke. In the same year Cavendish-Bentinck was granted the rank of a duke's younger son, becoming styled Lord Victor Cavendish-Bentinck.

The 8th Duke died in 1980 and Lord Victor succeeded him as 9th Duke. Upon the 9th Duke's own death in 1990, the dukedom and the Marquessate of Titchfield became extinct because the Duke's only son had predeceased him and there were no other surviving male line heirs of the 1st Duke. However, the earldom of Portland had been created in an earlier generation than the dukedom and there were surviving male line descendants of the 1st Earl. That title, along with its subsidiary titles of Viscount Woodstock and Baron Cirencester, therefore passed to the 9th Duke's kinsman Henry Noel Bentinck, who became the 11th Earl of Portland.

The 9th Duke was interred at the traditional burial place of the Dukes of Portland in the churchyard of St Winifred's Church, Holbeck in Nottinghamshire.

== Marriages and children ==
Cavendish-Bentinck married Clothilde Bruce Quigley (died 1984), an American heiress, on 16 February 1924. She was the daughter of James Bruce Quigley, a wealthy businessman from Dallas, Texas. They had two children together:

- William James Cavendish-Bentinck (6 July 1925 – 4 September 1966)
- Lady Margaret Cavendish-Bentinck (16 December 1929 – 1 March 2010)

Soon after World War II began Bentinck received a telephone call at his office from his Hungarian maid to tell him that his wife Clothilde had left him and taken their children with her. They were finally divorced in 1948.

Cavendish-Bentinck married secondly, Kathleen Elsie Barry (26 June 1912 - 10 January 2004) on 27 July 1948. She was the daughter of Arthur Barry. They had one daughter:

- Lady Barbara Cavendish-Bentinck

== Honours and arms ==
  (United Kingdom)
  - 1 January 1942: Companion of the Order of St Michael and St George (CMG)
  - 17 November 1977: Royal Warrant of Precedence as the younger son of a Duke

Coat of arms of Victor Cavendish-Bentinck, 9th Duke of Portland
Notes The title Duke of Portland was created by George I in 1716 . Coronet A Coronet of a Duke Crest Out of a ducal coronet proper two arms counter-embowed vested Gules, on the hands gloves Or, each holding an ostrich feather Argent (Bentinck); A snake nowed proper (Cavendish) Escutcheon Quarterly: 1st and 4th, Azure a cross moline Argent (Bentinck); 2nd and 3rd, Sable three stags' heads cabossed Argent attired Or, a crescent for difference (Cavendish) Supporters Two lions double queued, the dexter Or and the sinister sable Motto Craignez Honte (Fear Dishonour) Orders The Most Distinguished Order of St. Michael and St. George - Companion (CMG)

== Ancestry ==
Ancestors of Victor Cavendish-Bentinck, 9th Duke of Portland

8. Lord Frederick Cavendish-Bentinck
4. George Cavendish-Bentinck
9. Lady Mary Lowther
2. Frederick Cavendish-Bentinck
10. Col. Charles Powell Leslie
5. Prudentia Penelope Leslie
11. Christiana Fosbery
1. Victor Cavendish-Bentinck, 9th Duke of Portland
12. Edward Seymour, 12th Duke of Somerset
6. Ferdinand Seymour, Earl St. Maur
13. Georgiana Sheridan
3. Ruth Mary St. Maur
7. Rosina Elizabeth Swan

Diplomatic posts
Preceded by Owen O'Malley	Ambassador to Poland; 1945–1947	Succeeded by Donald Gainer
Government offices
Preceded by Ralph Stevenson	Chairman of the Joint Intelligence Committee; 1939–1945	Succeeded by Harold Caccia
Peerage of Great Britain
Preceded by Ferdinand Cavendish-Bentinck	Duke of Portland; 1980–1990	Extinct
Peerage of England
Preceded by Ferdinand Cavendish-Bentinck	Earl of Portland; 2nd creation 1980–1990	Succeeded by Henry Bentinck
