= Ferdinand Cavendish-Bentinck, 8th Duke of Portland =

British peer (1889-1980)

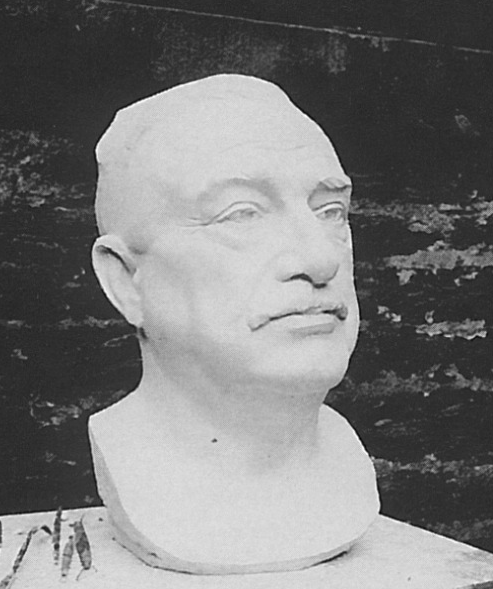
A sculpture of the 8th duke of Portland, Ferdinand Cavendish

Ferdinand William Cavendish-Bentinck, 8th Duke of Portland KBE CMG MC (4 July 1889 – 13 December 1980) was a British peer and grandson of George Cavendish-Bentinck.

== Early life ==
Cavendish-Bentinck was born on 4 July 1889. He was the son of Frederick W. Cavendish-Bentinck and Ruth Mary St Maur. His siblings were Lucy Joan Cavendish-Bentinck (wife of Sir Reginald Hervey Hoare, the British Envoy to Persia), Victor Cavendish-Bentinck, 9th Duke of Portland (who served as Assistant Under Secretary of State, Foreign Office in 1944 and as the British Ambassador to Poland from 1945 to 1947), and Venetia Barbara Cavendish-Bentinck.

His paternal grandparents were George Cavendish-Bentinck (a son of Maj.-Gen. Lord Frederick Cavendish-Bentinck, fourth son of the 3rd Duke of Portland) and Prudentia Penelope Leslie (the daughter of Col. Charles Powell Leslie). His mother was the illegitimate daughter of Ferdinand Seymour, Earl St. Maur, and a housemaid, Rosina Elizabeth Swan. Her grandfather was the son and heir of the 12th Duke of Somerset, and his wife, Georgiana Sheridan (a daughter of Thomas Sheridan and the novelist Caroline Callander).

Cavendish-Bentinck was educated at Eton and the Royal Military College, Sandhurst, passing out in 1910. He was commissioned into the 60th Rifles and was posted to Malta and British India before seeing active service in the European theatre of the First World War, which left him severely wounded.

== Career ==
He then took up a posting as assistant adjutant at the Royal Military College. After the war, his main sphere of activity was in East Africa, where he served as Private Secretary to the Governor of Uganda (1925–1927), Chairman of the Agricultural Production and Settlement Board for Kenya (1939–1945), Timber Controller for East Africa (1940–1945), Member of the Government of Kenya for Agriculture and Natural Resources (1945–1955), and Speaker of the Kenya Legislative Council (1955–1960). He was a Delegate to the Delhi Conference of 1940.

He became the heir presumptive of his third cousin, William Cavendish-Bentinck, 7th Duke of Portland, after the deaths of the latter's brother Lord (Francis) Morven Dallas Cavendish-Bentinck (1900-1950) and half-uncle Charles Cavendish-Bentinck (1868-1956). The previous duke's lands came to stay with the descendants of the 7th Duke and never passed to the distantly related 8th Duke in 1977.

In the early 20th century the usual tail male arrangement of the entailed largest landholdings became deprecated by powerful estates as it tended to leave noble daughters with little. The 6th Duke, before dying in 1943 broke the entails and set up a trust which saw as his son the future 7th Duke left no son Welbeck Abbey and other large holdings would go to his granddaughters in turn including Lady Anne Cavendish-Bentinck.

No viable family court case could ensue as the fee tail was abolished as a recognised entity in the abstract (in law) under the Law of Property Act 1925 and any remote, entailed beneficiaries could be disinherited under the Settled Land Acts. The new Duke of Portland continued to live in Nairobi.

Queen Elizabeth II shared an ancestor, in the 3rd Duke of Portland, through her maternal grandmother, Cecilia Cavendish-Bentinck, and was thus a third cousin, once removed of the 8th Duke of Portland.

== Personal life ==
In 1912, he married Wentworth Frances (d 1964), daughter of William James Hope-Johnston. They divorced in 1950 without issue.

In 1950, he married Gwyneth Ethel (d 1986), daughter of John Lesley Edwards and widow of Colonel David A.J. Bowie. Again, this marriage produced no issue.

He was succeeded by his younger brother, Victor Cavendish-Bentinck, as the 9th Duke upon his death.

== Arms ==
Coat of arms of Ferdinand Cavendish-Bentinck, 8th Duke of Portland
Notes The title Duke of Portland was created by George I in 1716 . Coronet A Coronet of a Duke Crest Out of a ducal coronet proper two arms counter-embowed vested Gules, on the hands gloves Or, each holding an ostrich feather Argent (Bentinck); A snake nowed proper (Cavendish) Escutcheon Quarterly: 1st and 4th, Azure a cross moline Argent (Bentinck); 2nd and 3rd, Sable three stags' heads cabossed Argent attired Or, a crescent for difference (Cavendish) Supporters Two lions double queued, the dexter Or and the sinister sable Motto Craignez Honte (Fear Dishonour) Orders The Most Excellent Order of the British Empire - Knight Commander (KBE); The Most Distinguished Order of St. Michael and St. George - Companion (CMG); The Military Cross (MC)

Peerage of Great Britain
Preceded by William Cavendish-Bentinck	Duke of Portland; 1977–1980	Succeeded by Victor Cavendish-Bentinck
