= Henry Bentinck, 1st Duke of Portland =

English peer and Governor of Jamaica

His Grace The Duke of Portland
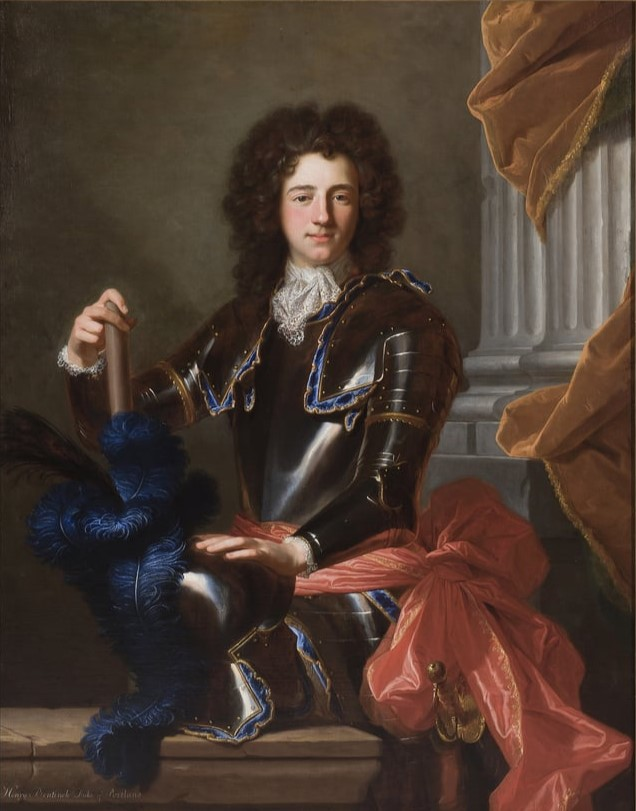
- A 1699 portrait of Bentinck

Member of Parliament for Southampton
- In office 1705–1708

Member of Parliament for Hampshire
- In office 1708–1709

Governor of Jamaica
- In office 1721–1726

Personal details
- Born: 17 March 1682
- Died: 4 July 1726 (aged 44) Spanish Town, Jamaica
- Resting place: Westminster Abbey
- Party: Whig
- Spouse: Lady Elizabeth Noel
- Children: 7, including William and George
- Parent(s): William Bentinck, 1st Earl of Portland; Anne Villiers

Henry Bentinck, 1st Duke of Portland (17 March 1682 – 4 July 1726) was a British Army officer, Whig politician and colonial administrator who served as the governor of Jamaica from 1721 to 1726. Styled Viscount Woodstock from 1689 until 1709, he sat in the English and British House of Commons from 1705 until 1709 when he succeeded to the peerage of Great Britain as Earl of Portland.

== Early life ==
Bentinck was the second, but eldest surviving, son of William Bentinck, 1st Earl of Portland, and his wife Anne née Villiers. His mother was from the Villiers family, the eldest daughter of Sir Edward Villiers and sister of Edward Villiers, 1st Earl of Jersey. From 1702 to 1703, Bentinck did the Grand Tour around Europe, travelling through Italy and Germany with his tutor, the historian Paul de Rapin. On 9 June 1704, he married Lady Elizabeth Noel, daughter of Wriothesley Baptist Noel, 2nd Earl of Gainsborough and Catherine Greville at Chiswick, an heiress with a fortune of £60,000, who brought him the estate of Titchfield in Hampshire. Noel Street in Soho, London, is named after her.

== Career ==
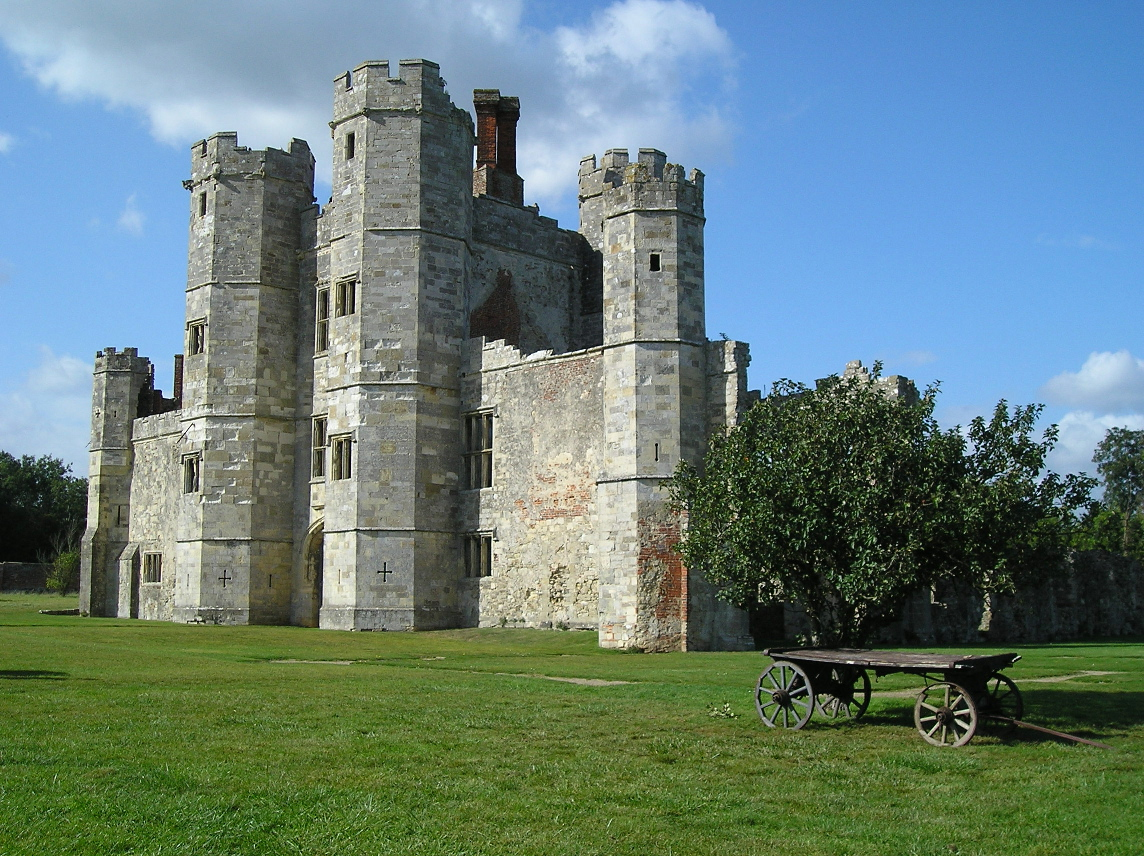
Titchfield Abbey in 2005

At the 1705 English general election, Bentinck was returned in a contest as Whig Member of Parliament for Southampton. Apart from carrying out minor functions, he appears to have been inactive in Parliament. At the 1708 British general election, he was returned unopposed for Southampton and in a contest at Hampshire, and opted to sit for Hampshire. He acted as a teller for the Whigs. He succeeded his father as Earl of Portland on 23 November 1709 and vacated his seat in the House of Commons to sit in the Lords. He now owned the principal family seat of Bulstrode in Berkshire, and also inherited estates worth about £850,150 in Cheshire, Cumberland, Hertfordshire, Norfolk, Sussex, Westminster and Yorkshire. In 1710, he was appointed Colonel of the 1st Troop of Horse Guards until 1713. He was created Marquess of Titchfield and Duke of Portland on 6 July 1716. In 1719 he was one of main subscribers in the Royal Academy of Music (1719), a corporation that produced baroque opera on stage. He was appointed Lord of the Bedchamber in 1717 and held the post for the rest of hislife.

Portland lost vast sums of money in the South Sea Bubble in 1720. In 1721, he accepted the post of Governor of Jamaica, which was a lucrative but not a very prestigious post, and one with a low survival rate. There, he acquired ownership of 287 slaves, 158 of whom were male and 129 females.

== Death and legacy ==
Portland died in Jamaica at Spanish Town on 4 July 1726, aged 45, and his body was returned to England for burial. He was interred on 3 November 1726 in Westminster Abbey in the vault of the Dukes of Ormond located in the King Henry VII Chapel. Portland and his wife had three sons and seven daughters, who included

- William Bentinck, Viscount Woodstock, later Marquess of Titchfield, later 2nd Duke of Portland (1709–1762)
- Lord George (1715–1759), soldier
- Lady Anne (d. 1749), married Col. Daniel Paul
- Lady Amelia Catharina (d. 1756), married Jacob van Wassenaer, Heer van Hazerswoude-Waddingsveen
- Lady Isabella (d. 1783), married Henry Monck, uncle of Charles Monck, 1st Viscount Monck; their daughter Elizabeth married the 1st Marquess of Waterford.

== Arms ==
Coat of arms of Henry Bentinck, 1st Duke of Portland
Crest Out of a ducal coronet proper two arms counter-embowed vested gules, on the hands gloves or, each holding an ostrich feather argent. Escutcheon Azure, a cross moline argent. Supporters Two lions double queued, the dexter or, the sinister sable. Motto Craignez Honte (Fear Dishonour).

Parliament of England
Preceded by Adam de Cardonnel; Frederick Tylney	Member of Parliament for Southampton; 1705–1707; With: Adam de Cardonnel	Succeeded by Parliament of Great Britain
Parliament of Great Britain
Preceded by Parliament of England	Member of Parliament for Southampton; 1707–1708; With: Adam de Cardonnel	Succeeded by Adam de Cardonnel; Simeon Stewart
Preceded by Thomas Jervoise; Richard Chaundler	Member of Parliament for Hampshire; 1708–1709; With: Marquess of Winchester	Succeeded by Marquess of Winchester; Thomas Jervoise
Military offices
Preceded by The Earl of Albemarle	Captain and Colonel of His Majesty's Own Troop of Horse Guards; 1710–1713	Succeeded by The Lord Ashburnham
Government offices
Preceded by Sir Nicholas Lawes	Governor of Jamaica; 1722–1726	Succeeded by John Ayscough (acting)
Peerage of Great Britain
New creation	Duke of Portland; 1716–1726	Succeeded by William Bentinck
Peerage of England
Preceded by William Bentinck	Earl of Portland; 1709–1726	Succeeded by William Bentinck
