= William Bentinck, 1st Earl of Portland =

Dutch-born British courtier and diplomat

The Right Honourable The Earl of Portland KG PC
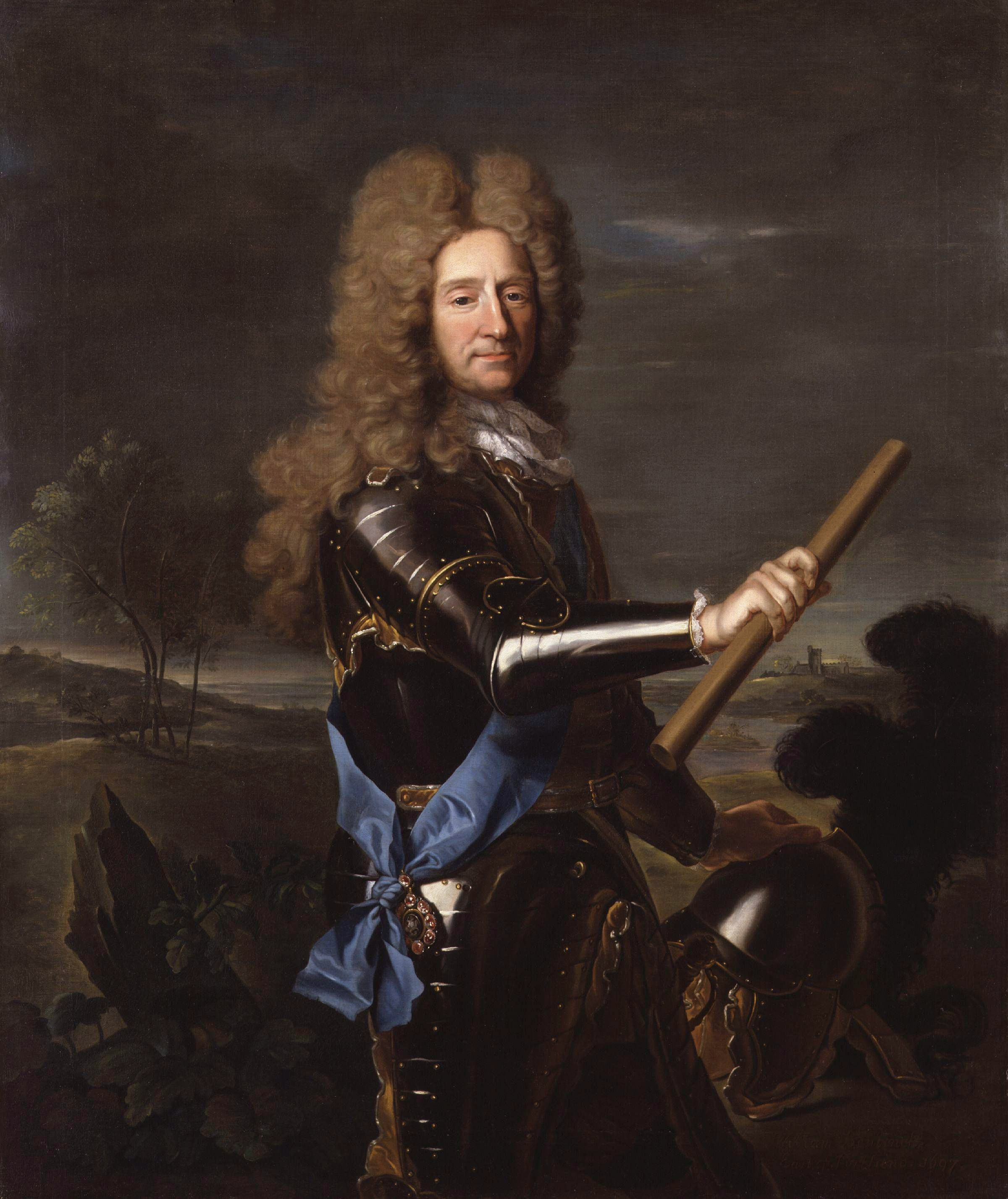
- Portrait by Hyacinthe Rigaud, c. 1698–1699

English Ambassador to France
- In office 1697–1698
- Preceded by: The Lord Waldegrave
- Succeeded by: The Earl of Jersey

Personal details
- Born: 20 July 1649 Diepenheim, Overijssel, Dutch Republic
- Died: 23 November 1709 (aged 60) Bulstrode Park, Buckinghamshire, Kingdom of England
- Spouse(s): Anne Villiers; Jane Martha Temple
- Children: 13, including Mary, Henry, and Willem
- Parent(s): Bernard, Baron Bentinck; Anna van Bloemendaal

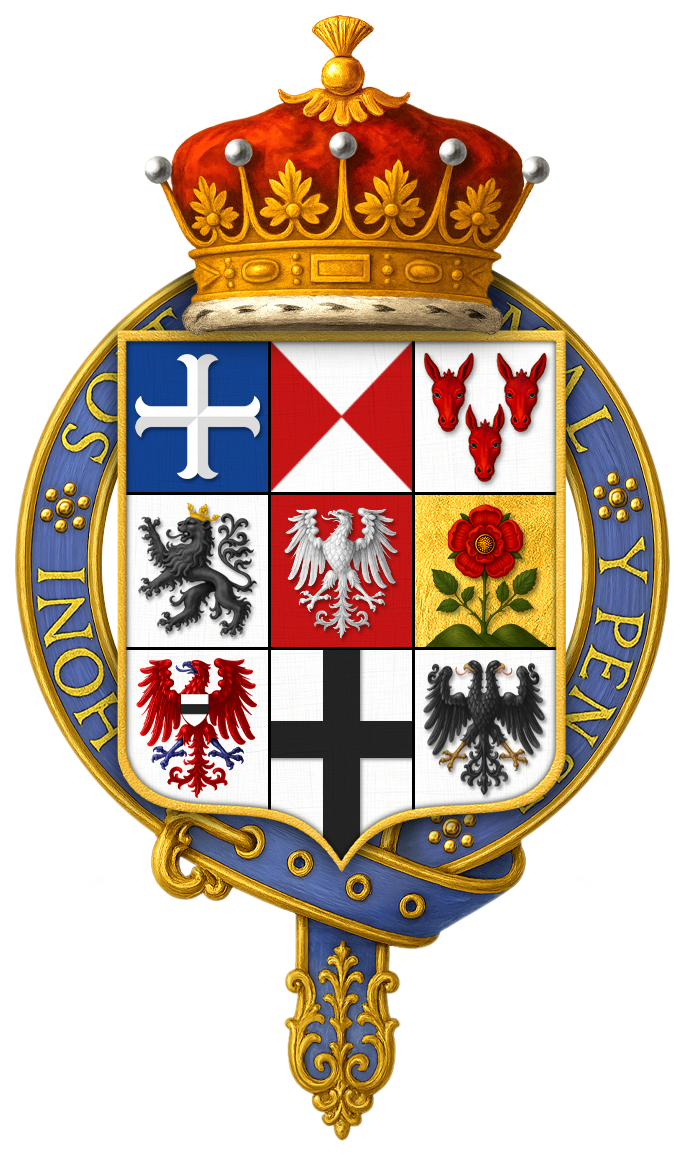
Quartered arms of William Bentinck, 1st Earl of Portland, KG, PC

William Bentinck, 1st Earl of Portland (Dutch: Hans Willem Bentinck; 20 July 1649 – 23 November 1709) was a Dutch-born British courtier and diplomat who became in an early stage the favourite of William, Prince of Orange, Stadtholder in the Netherlands, and future King of England. He was reportedly steady, sensible, modest and usually moderate. The friendship and cooperation stopped in 1699.

== Biography ==
=== Early life and nurse to Prince William ===
Hans Willem was born in Diepenheim, Overijssel, the son of Bernard, Baron Bentinck, and was descended from an ancient and noble family of Guelders and Overijssel. He was appointed first page of honour and chamberlain. When, in 1675, Prince William was attacked by smallpox, his physicians suggested he sleep with one of his pages to absorb "animal spirits" from a young, healthy body. Bentinck was the page and he nursed the prince assiduously back to health. This devotion secured for him the special and enduring friendship of William. From that point on, Bentinck had the Prince's confidence, and in their correspondence, William was very open.

=== Communicator ===
In 1677 he was sent to England to solicit for Prince William the hand of Mary Stuart, daughter of James, Duke of York and future King of England. He was again in England on William's behalf in 1683 and in 1685. Later, in 1688, when William was preparing to assist in the overthrow of (now King) James including an invasion by Dutch troops, Bentinck went to some of the German princes to secure their support, or at least their neutrality. He had also been, since 1687, a medium of communication between his master and his English friends. Bentinck superintended the arrangements for the invasion, including raising money, hiring an enormous transport fleet, organising a propaganda offensive, and preparing the possible landing sites, and also sailed to England with Prince William.

=== Titles and military service ===
The revolution accomplished, William (now King of England) made Bentinck Groom of the Stole, first gentleman of the bedchamber, and a Privy Counsellor. In April 1689 he was created Baron Cirencester, Viscount Woodstock and, in its second creation, Earl of Portland. (The first creation of the earldom had been made for Richard Weston in 1633, but it became extinct in 1688.) He commanded some cavalry at the Battle of the Boyne in 1690, and was present at the Battle of Landen, where he was wounded, and at the Siege of Namur in 1695.

=== Diplomat ===
Bentinck's main work was of a diplomatic nature. In 1690 he was sent to The Hague to help solve the problem between William and the burgomasters of Amsterdam. He was caught up in the corruption scandal concerning the East India Company in 1695; the board was losing its monopoly under pressure from a New Company and was engaging profusely in bribery in an attempt to renew its charter. He was however cleared in the matter. Having thwarted the Jacobite plot to murder the King in 1696, he helped to arrange the peace of Ryswick in 1697. In 1698 he was ambassador to Paris for six months. While there, he opened negotiations with Louis XIV for a partition of the Spanish monarchy, and as William's representative, signed the two partition treaties (Treaty of The Hague (1698)).

=== Resignation and land gifts ===
William Bentinck had, however, become very jealous of the rising influence of another Dutchman, Arnold van Keppel, and, in 1699, he resigned all his offices in the royal household. He did not forfeit the esteem of the King, who continued to trust and employ him. Portland had been loaded with gifts, and this, together with the jealousy felt for him as a foreigner, made him very unpopular in England. He received 135,000 acres (546 km^{2}) of land in Ireland, and only the strong opposition of a united House of Commons prevented him obtaining a large gift of crown lands in North Wales. For his share in drawing up the partition treaties, he was impeached in 1701, but the case against him did not proceed. He was occasionally employed on public business under Queen Anne until his death at his residence, Bulstrode Park in Buckinghamshire. Portland's eldest son Henry succeeded him as earl, and was granted the titles of Marquess of Titchfield and Duke of Portland in 1716.

== Codex Bentingiana ==
While living in the Netherlands, Bentinck maintained a garden boasting many botanical rarities. Illustrations of these plants were collected under the name Codex Bentingiana. This work has since disappeared from the botanical scene.

== Family ==
Lord Portland was married twice. On 1 February 1678, he married his first wife, Anne Villiers (died 30 November 1688), daughter of Sir Edward Villiers and his wife Lady Frances Howard, daughter of the 2nd Earl of Suffolk. They had seven children:

- Lady Mary Bentinck (20 August 1679 – 20 August 1726), who married, firstly, the 2nd Earl of Essex on 28 February 1692 and had one son and two daughters. She married, secondly, Sir Conyers D'Arcy (died 1 December 1758), circa August 1714 and had no issue.
- Willem Bentinck (3 March 1681 – 26 May 1688)
- Henry Bentinck, 1st Duke of Portland (17 March 1682 – 4 July 1726)
- Lady Anna Margaretha Bentinck (19 March 1683 – 3 May 1763), who married Arent van Wassenaar, Baron van Wassenaar circa 1701 and had at least one daughter.
- Lady Frances Wilhelmina Bentinck (18 February 1684 – 31 March 1712), who married the 4th Baron Byron (4 January 1670 – 8 August 1736) on 19 December 1706 and had four children.
- Lady Eleonora Sophia Bentinck (born 8 April 1687)
- Lady Isabella Bentinck (4 May 1688 – 23 February 1728), who married the 1st Duke of Kingston-upon-Hull on 2 August 1714.

He was briefly engaged to Stuarta Werburge Howard (1669-1706), a granddaughter of King Charles II of England, but the engagement was either broken or abandoned. Instead, he married on 12 May 1700, his second wife, Jane Martha Temple (1672 – 26 May 1751), daughter of Sir John Temple, and widow of John Berkeley, 3rd Baron Berkeley of Stratton. They had the following children:

- Lady Sophia Bentinck (4 April 1701 – 5 June 1741), who married the 1st Duke of Kent on 24 March 1729 and had issue.
- Lady Elizabeth Adriana Bentinck (27 June 1703 – 1765), who married Rev. The Hon. Henry Egerton (died 1 April 1746) on 18 December 1720 and had issue.
- The Hon. William Bentinck, 1st Count Bentinck (6 November 1704 – 13 October 1774), who married Charlotte Sophie, Countess von Aldenburg (4 August 1715 – 5 February 1800) on 1 June 1733 and had two sons. In 1990, after the extinction of the male line from his half-brother the 1st Duke of Portland, his descendant Henry Bentinck, 7th Count Bentinck became the 11th Earl of Portland. One of his sons, Captain John Albert Bentinck, Royal Navy, of Terrington St Clement in Norfolk, a Count of the Empire, founded the line of Bentinck of Indio in the parish of Bovey Tracey in Devon.
- Lady Harriet Bentinck (12 November 1705 – 10 June 1792), who married James Hamilton, 1st Earl of Clanbrassill (bef. 1697 – 17 March 1758) on 15 October 1728 and had two children.
- The Hon. Charles John Bentinck (2 June 1708 – 18 March 1779), who married Lady Margaret Cadogan on 11 January 1738.
- Lady Barbara Bentinck (20 October 1709 – 1 April 1736), who married the 2nd Baron Godolphin (1707 – 25 May 1785) on 18 February 1734; no issue.

In 1718, as the Dowager Countess of Portland, Jane was appointed Governess to the daughters of George Augustus, Prince of Wales (later King George II), with a salary of £2000 a year.

Court offices
Preceded by The Earl of Peterborough	Groom of the Stole; 1689–1700	Succeeded by The Earl of Romney
Preceded by James Graham	Keeper of the Privy Purse; 1689–1700	Succeeded by Caspar Frederick Henning
Diplomatic posts
Vacant Nine Years' War Title last held by The Lord Waldegrave	English Ambassador to France; 1697–1698	Succeeded by The Earl of Jersey
Peerage of England
New creation	Earl of Portland; 1689–1709	Succeeded by Henry Bentinck
Dutch nobility
Preceded by Bernard, Baron Bentinck	Baron Bentinck; 1649–1709	Succeeded by Henry Bentinck
