= List of ship launches in 1783 =

The list of ship launches in 1783 includes a chronological list of some ships launched in 1783.

Date	Ship	Class	Builder	Location	Country	Notes
6 January	Dictator	Inflexible-class ship of the line	Batson	Limehouse	Great Britain	For Royal Navy.
20 January	Gladiator	Roebuck-class ship	Adams	Bucklers Hard	Great Britain	For Royal Navy.
21 January	Carnatic	Courageux-class ship of the line	Dudman	Deptford Wharf	Great Britain	For Royal Navy.
3 February	Dryade	Hébé-class frigate		Saint-Malo	Kingdom of France	For French Navy.
22 March	Rattler	Echo-class sloop	Francis S. Willson	Sandgate	Great Britain	For Royal Navy.
23 March	Désirée	Seine-class Flûte (ship)	Jean-Joseph Ginoux	Havre de Grâce	Kingdom of France	For French Navy.
March	Seine	Seine-class Flûte (ship)	Jean-Joseph Ginoux	Havre de Grace	Kingdom of France	For French Navy.
3 April	Powerful	Elizabeth-class ship of the line	John Perry	Blackwall Yard	Great Britain	For Royal Navy.
4 April	Chetyrnadsatye	Vosmoi-class frigate	O. Matveev	Gnilotonskaya	Russia	For Imperial Russian Navy.
18 April	Weazle	Childers-class sloop	Andrew Hills	Sandwich	Great Britain	For Royal Navy.
2 May	Iris	Amazon-class frigate	Balthazar Adams	Deptford	Great Britain	For Royal Navy.
4 May	Shestnadtsatyi	Vosmoi-class frigate	O. Matveev	Gnilotonskaya	Russia	For Imperial Russian Navy.
11 May	Grom	Perun-class bomb vessel	V. A. Selyaninov	Saint Petersburg	Russia	For Imperial Russian Navy.
16 May	Boleslav	Aziia-class ship of the line	M. D. Portnov	Arkhangelsk	Russia	For Imperial Russian Navy.
16 May	Mecheslav	Aziia-class ship of the line	M. D. Portnov	Arkhangelsk	Russia	For Imperial Russian Navy.
16 May	Vozmislav	Modified Pavel-class frigate	M. D. Portnov	Arkhangelsk	Russia	For Imperial Russian Navy.
17 May	Charon	Roebuck-class ship	Hilhouse	Bristol	Great Britain	For Royal Navy.
May	Nécéssaire	Seine-class Flûte (ship)		Havre de Grâce	Kingdom of France	For French Navy.
May	Megaera	Tisiphone-class fireship	Stephen Teague	Ipswich	Great Britain	For Royal Navy.
9 June	Ioann Krestitel	Ches'ma-class ship of the line	V. A. Selyaninov	Saint Petersburg	Russia	For Imperial Russian Navy.
16 June	Culloden	Ganges-class ship of the line	John Randall	Rotherhithe	Great Britain	For Royal Navy.
16 June	Druid	Hermione-class frigate	Teast, Tombes & Blaming	Bristol	Great Britain	For Royal Navy.
30 June	San José	First rate	Francisco Gautier	Ferrol	Spain	For Spanish Navy.
20 June	Tritão	Fifth rate		Lisbon	Portugal	For Portuguese Navy.
June	Étoile	Seine-class Flûte (ship)		Bayonne	Kingdom of France	For French Navy.
1 July	Rose	Enterprise-class frigate	Stewart and Hall	Sandgate	Great Britain	For Royal Navy.
5 July	Séduisant	Séduisant-class ship of the line		Toulon	Kingdom of France	For French Navy.
15 July	Phoenix	Perseverance-class frigate	George Parsons	Bursledon	Great Britain	For Royal Navy.
19 July	Prins Willem	Third rate		Rotterdam	Dutch Republic	For Dutch Navy.
19 July	Venus	Bellona-class frigate		Karlskrona	Sweden	For Royal Swedish Navy.
31 July	Bourbon	Frigate	Cotton John	Chatham, Connecticut	United States	For Continental Navy.
4 August	Mercure	Séduisant-class ship of the line		Toulon	Kingdom of France	For French Navy.
9 August	Prindsesse Lovisa Augusta	Indfødsretten-class ship of the line	Henrik Gerner	Copenhagen	Denmark-Norway	For Dano-Norwegian Navy.
15 August	Princess Royal	Full-rigged ship		Liverpool	Great Britain	For Baker & Dawson.
2 September	Rättvisan	Third rate	Frederik Henrik af Chapman	Karlskrona	Sweden	For Royal Swedish Navy.
9 September	Berrington	East Indiaman	Perry & Hankey, or Randall	Blackwall	Great Britain	For British East India Company.
9 September	Hillsborough	East Indiaman	Perry & Co.	Blackwall Yard	Great Britain	For British East India Company.
12 September	Leda	Perseverance-class frigate	John Randall	Rotherhithe	Great Britain	For Royal Navy.
12 September	Prins Maurits	Third rate		Amsterdam	Dutch Republic	For Dutch Navy.
12 September	Vulcan	Tisiphone-class fireship		Shoreham-by-Sea	Great Britain	For Royal Navy.
16 September	Slava Ekateriny	Slava Ekateriny-class ship of the line	S. I. Afanaseyev	Kherson	Russia	For Imperial Russian Navy.
26 September	Europa	Portland-class frigate	Henry Peake	Woolwich Dockyard	Great Britain	For Royal Navy.
26 September	Trekh Ierarkhov	Ches'ma-class ship of the line	I. V. James	Saint Petersburg	Russia	For Imperial Russian Navy.
27 September	Calypso	Echo-class sloop-of-war	Edward Graves	Deptford	Great Britain	For Royal Navy.
September	Middlesex	East Indiaman	Adams & Barnard, or Randall	Deptford	Great Britain	For British East India Company.
27 October	Penelope	Hermione-class frigate	John Barton	Liverpool	Great Britain	For Royal Navy.
28 October	Conflagration	Tisiphone-class fireship	John Pelham	Shoreham-by-Sea	Great Britain	For Royal Navy.
28 October	Inconstant	Perseverance-class frigate	William Barnard	Deptford	Great Britain	For Royal Navy.
11 November	Comet	Tisiphone-class fireship	Moses Game	Harwich	Great Britain	For Royal Navy.
13 November	Thunderer	Culloden-class ship of the line	John & William Wells	Deptford	Great Britain	For Royal Navy.
25 November	Thisbe	Enterprise-class frigate	Thomas King	Dover	Great Britain	For Royal Navy.
26 November	Oostergo	Third rate		Harlingen	Dutch Republic	For Dutch Navy.
10 December	Defiance	Elizabeth-class ship of the line	John Randall	Rotherhithe	Great Britain	For Royal Navy.
11 December	Greyhound	Amazon-class frigate	James Betts	Mistley	United Kingdom	For Royal Navy.
23 December	Vittoria	Leon Trionfante-class ship of the line	Andrea Chiribiri	Venice	Republic of Venice	For Venetian Navy.
December	Lord Camden	East Indiaman	Barnard	Deptford	Great Britain	For British East India Company.
Unknown date	Æolus	West Indiaman	Henrik Gerner	Åbenrå	Denmark-Norway	For Butz & Partners.
Unknown date	Albion	Merchantman		Liverpool	Great Britain	For private owner.
Unknown date	Atlantic	Merchantman		Swansea	Great Britain	For John St Barbe & Co.
Unknown date	Bahama	Ship of the line		Havana	(Spain) Cuba	For Spanish Navy.
Unknown date	Benjamin	Sloop	Nicholas Bools	Bridport	Great Britain	For Thomas Ford.
Unknown date	Berid-i Zafer	Third rate		Rhodes	Ottoman Greece	For Ottoman Navy.
Unknown date	Boyd	West Indiaman	Hill	Limehouse	Great Britain	For private owner.
Unknown date	Britannia	Brig		Maryport	Great Britain	For Mr. Younghusband.
Unknown date	Britannia	Brig		Saltcoats	Great Britain	For Bent & Salisbury.
Unknown date	Britannia	Brig		Sunderland	Great Britain	For John St Barbe & Co.
Unknown date	Britannia	Whaler		Bridport	Great Britain	For Samuel Enderby & Sons.
Unknown date	Britannia	Full-rigged ship	Nicholas Bools	Bridport	Great Britain	For Mr. Le Messurier.
Unknown date	Delft	Fourth rate	De Hoog & De Wit	Delfshaven	Dutch Republic	For Dutch Navy.
Unknown date	Dordrecht	Third rate	Jacob Spaans	Dordrecht	Dutch Republic	For Dutch Navy.
Unknown date	Duchess of Portland	West Indiaman		Bristol	Great Britain	For private owner.
Unknown date	Duckenfield Hall	West Indiaman		River Thames	Great Britain	For Mr. Nesbit.
Unknown date	Duke of Buccleugh	Merchantman		Yarmouth	Great Britain	For Mr. Thompson.
Unknown date	Elliott	Slave ship		Liverpool	Great Britain	For F. Ingram & Co.
Unknown date	Fletcher	East Indiaman	John & William Wells	Rotherhithe	Great Britain	For British East India Company.
unknown date	Friderichsværn	Frigate	Henrik Gerner	Copenhagen	Denmark-Norway	For Dano-Norwegian Navy.
Unknown date	Friesland	Third rate	J. Swerus	Harlingen	Dutch Republic	For Dutch Navy.
Unknown date	Hersteller	Third rate		Amsterdam	Dutch Republic	For Dutch Navy.
Unknown date	Hoop	Third rate		Amsterdam	Dutch Republic	For Dutch Navy.
Unknown date	Horn	Full-rigged ship		Sunderland	Great Britain	For private owner.
Unknown date	Iris	Slave ship		Liverpool	Great Britain	For Backhouse et al.
Unknown date	Jenny	Schooner		Harbour Grace	(Kingdom of Great Britain) Newfoundland	For John Clements.
Unknown date	King George	West Indiaman		River Thames	Great Britain	For Neave & Co.
Unknown date	Kurer	Kurer-class schooner		Gnilotonskaya	Russia	For Imperial Russian Navy.
Unknown date	Lord Donoughmore	Cutter	Nicholas Bools	Bridport	Great Britain	For Mr. O'Conner.
Unknown date	Lord Mulgrave	Merchantman		Whitby	Great Britain	For private owner.
Unknown date	Margaret and Ann	Brig		Sunderland	Great Britain	For private owner.
Unknown date	Nancy	Sloop	Nicholas Bools	Bridport	Great Britain	For Robert Thorne & Thomas Ford.
Unknown date	Noord Holland	Third rate		Amsterdam	Dutch Republic	For Dutch Navy.
Unknown date	Piadnadtsatyi	Vosmoi-class Frigate		Gnilotonskaya	Russia	For Imperial Russian Navy.
Unknown date	Post	Brig		Amsterdam	Dutch Republic	For Dutch Navy.
Unknown date	Rachel	Brig		Whitby	Great Britain	For Coulson, Holt & Lacy.
Unknown date	Rotterdam	Third rate		Rotterdam	Dutch Republic	For Dutch Navy.
Unknown date	Salamander	Cutter		Amsterdam	Dutch Republic	For Dutch Navy.
Unknown date	San Sebastián	San Fermin-class ship of the line		Pasaia	Spain	For Spanish Navy.
Unknown date	Sante Elisabeth	Frigate		Valletta	Malta	For Navy of the Order of Saint John.
Unknown date	Semend-i Bahri	Third rate		Sinop	Ottoman Empire	For Ottoman Navy.
Unknown date	Sokol	Kurer-class schooner		Gnilotonskaya	Russia	For Imperial Russian Navy.
Unknown date	Statenjacht	Jacht		Rotterdam	Dutch Republic	For Dutch Navy.
Unknown date	Tılsım-ı Bahri	Fourth rate		Rhodes	Ottoman Greece	For Ottoman Navy.
Unknown date	Vliegende Vis	Full-rigged ship		Amsterdam	Dutch Republic	For Dutch Navy.
Unknown date	Vrijheid	Third rate		location	Dutch Republic	For Dutch Navy.
Unknown date	Westfriesland	Third rate		Medemblik	Dutch Republic	For Dutch Navy.
Unknown date	Westmoreland	Merchantman		Yarmouth	Great Britain	For T. Mangles.
Unknown date	Windsor Castle	West Indiaman		Whitby	Great Britain	For private owner.
Unknown date	Zeven Provincien	Third rate		Amsterdam	Dutch Republic	For Dutch Navy.
Unknown date	Name unknown	Merchantman			Kingdom of France	For private owner.
Unknown date	Name unknown	Brig			Kingdom of France	For private owner.
Unknown date	Name unknown	Full-rigged ship		Southampton	Great Britain	For private owner.
