= Eliza (ship) =

A number of sailing ships have been named Eliza.

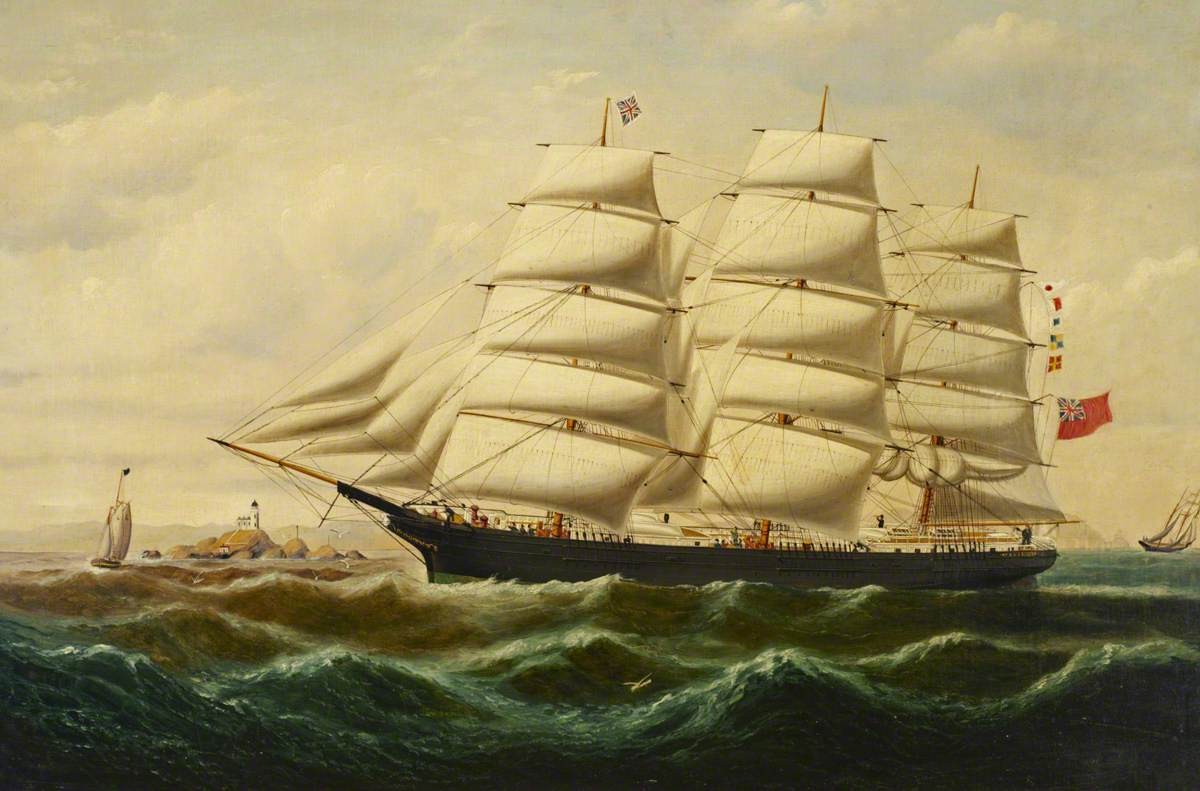
William H. Yorke (1847–1921), undated, The ship 'Eliza' in full sail

- Eliza (shipwreck), a 10-ton (bm) long boat that disappeared off the coast of Victoria, Australia in 1797.
- Eliza (1783 ship) was launched in America in 1780 and taken in prize in 1782. Under British ownership she made nine slave voyages between 1783 and her loss in 1797. In total, she had embarked 3769 slaves and landed 3013, for a loss rate of 18.7%.

The voyages of the next three ships are often confused,

- Eliza (1789 ship) was a 236-ton (bm) ship launched at New Brunswick in 1789 that made six or so voyages as a South Seas whaler, and afterwards one voyage as a slave ship; she then disappears from online records.
- Eliza (1800 ship), a 268-ton (bm) ship launched in Spain in 1794, captured c.1800, that made one voyage for the British East India Company (EIC), and one as a whaler, and then became a West Indiaman; she was sold to Portuguese interests in 1810 and is last listed as Courier de Londres in 1814.
- Eliza (1802 ship), of 264 tons (bm), was a French prize that made nine voyages as a whaler between 1802 and 1822. She is last listed in 1824.
- Eliza (1802 Philadelphia ship) was launched in Philadelphia and came into British ownership in 1802. She was briefly a privateer sailing out of Liverpool. A highly valuable prize that she captured in 1805, in company with another privateer, resulted in a court case in which Eliza's captain successfully sued a captain in the British Royal Navy for having pressed some of her crew. Eliza spent the great bulk of her career as a merchantman, either as a coaster or in sailing between England and the western coast of the Iberian Peninsula. She was last listed in 1820.
- Eliza (1804 ship), a 512/538-ton (bm) merchant ship built in British India in 1804, probably in Calcutta, that made five voyages transporting convicts to Australia and one voyage for the EIC. She became waterlogged in 1836 and her crew abandoned her at sea.
- Eliza (1808), a 135-ton (bm) merchant ship built in Providence, Rhode Island that was wrecked SSW off Nairai Island, Fiji in 1808.
- Eliza (1811 ship), a 200-ton merchant ship built in Calcutta, British India in 1811, that made two voyages transporting convicts from Calcutta to Australia before she wrecked in 1815.
- Eliza (1813 ship), of then 189 tons (bm), was built at Bombay. She was sold in September 1831 and renamed Will Watch. From 1832 to 1834 she sailed between Penang, Malacca, Singapore, and Calcutta. She had been involved in the opium trade under Captain Bristow. Then in 1837 she was rebuilt at Calcutta. In 1841, Will Watch, of 251 tons (bm), was owned by G Lyall of London. She made several voyages for the New Zealand Company. She sailed from London on 25 July 1845 on a whaling voyage to the southern whale fishery. She returned to London on 12 October 1848.
- Eliza (1815 ship), a 391-ton merchant ship built in Java, Netherlands East Indies in 1815. She made two voyages transporting convicts from England to Australia. She was last listed in 1848.
- Eliza (1816 ship) was built in Calcutta, India, in 1816. She performed many voyages between England and India under a license from the British East India Company (EIC), and then as a free trader. She also made one voyage on behalf of the EIC. She was still listed in 1860.
- Eliza (1824 ship), was a 344-ton (bm) merchant ship built at Prince Edward Island, Canada in 1824. She made one voyage transporting convicts from Hobart Town to Sydney. She was last listed in 1843.
- Eliza (1829 ship), was a 140-ton brig built at Chepstow in Wales in 1829 at a cost of £3000. In October, 1831 she was sailing up the west coast of South America from Callao to Guayaquil under Captain Davies, and from there was bound to northern California to take a load of pelts back to England.
- Eliza (1835 ship), was an 118-ton schooner/barque built in Tasmania in 1835. She made 13 whaling voyages from Hobart between 1845 and 1857.
