= Duchess of Portland (ship) =

Several ships have been named Duchess of Portland (or Dutchess of Portland) for one or another of the Duchesses of Portland:

- Duchess of Portland (1783 ship) was launched at Bristol. She was primarily a West Indiaman but made one voyage as a slave ship and two as a whaler in the British Southern Whale Fishery. The US Navy captured her in 1812 and burnt her.
- Duchess of Portland (1826 ship) was launched at Troon. She was wrecked on 12 February 1867.
