= Omba =

Omba or OMBA may refer to:

- Omba, Missouri, an historic town in eastern Douglas County, Missouri
- Omba Island, Indonesia
- Omba Island, another name for Ambae Island, Vanuatu
- Omba language, another name for East Ambae language, an Oceanic language spoken on Vanuatu
- Online Master of Business Administration
- Ocala Mountain Biking Association, organization that maintains the Santos Trail System in Florida

== See also ==
- Omba Mokomba, 1997–1999 Disney Channel nature show
