= West Middlesex =

West Middlesex may refer to:

- West Middlesex Hospital, England
- West Middlesex, Pennsylvania, U.S.

== See also ==
- Middlesex (disambiguation)
