= Rachel (ship) =

Several vessels have been named Rachel or Rachael:

- Rachel (1783 ship) was launched at Whitby. She primarily traded with the Baltic, but made some voyages as a West Indiaman. A gale caused her crew to abandon her near Memel in October 1817.
- Rachel (1795 ship) was launched at Bristol. She spent most of her career as a constant trader, sailing to and from Nevis. A French privateer captured her in 1803 but a Liverpool letter of marque quickly recaptured here. She was wrecked in July 1811.
- Rachael (1801 ship) was launched in 1795 at Spain and may have been taken in prize. She entered British records in 1801. In 1803 she suffered a maritime mishap, and was captured by a French privateer, but recaptured by the British Royal Navy. She was lost at Fayal, Azores in 1810.
- Rachel (1810 ship) was launched at Hilton (possibly South Hylton) or Sunderland, and apparently was initially registered and based at Greenock. In 1812 an American privateer captured her in a notable single-ship action, but the British Royal Navy recaptured her almost immediately. She then continued as a general trader and was last listed in 1833.
- Rachel (1811 ship) was launched in Quebec. On 24 January 1813 she was sailing from Newfoundland to Barbados when she encountered a gale at 41°34′N 46°52′W that dismasted her and reduced her to a complete wreck. She was condemned at Terceira Island.
