= Lion (ship) =

Several ships have been named Lion for the lion:

- Lion (privateer ship) was sailed by Francis Drake in 1572–1573.
- Lion (1796 ship) was launched in the Netherlands in 1789. She was taken in prize c.1795. On her first voyage under British ownership she was under contract to the British East India Company (EIC). She was lost in 1798 on the homeward-bound leg of her voyage to India.
- Lion (1809 ship) was a Spanish vessel launched in 1802 that the British came to own in 1809. She was a merchantman and letter of marque. She captured the American privateer Matilda in a notable single-ship action in 1813. Lion was wrecked some months later.

== See also ==
- HMS Lion – one of 18 ships of the Royal Navy
- HM hired armed cutter Lion – one of two vessels of the Royal Navy
- Lion (disambiguation)
