= Neptune (1785 ship) =

History

Thirteen Colonies
- Launched: 1778, Thirteen Colonies
- Fate: Sold c. 1786

Great Britain
- Name: Neptune
- Acquired: 1785
- Fate: Last listed 1803

General characteristics
- Tons burthen: 213, or 218, or 250, or 300 (bm)

Neptune was launched in the Thirteen Colonies in 1778. She entered Lloyd's Register as Neptune in 1786. (She apparently entered British ownership in 1785, but Lloyd's Register was not published in 1785.) She then sailed as general merchantman. In the late 1790s she was a whaler in the British southern whale fishery. She was last listed in 1803, though the data is stale and she was last surveyed in 1797.

== Career ==
Lloyd's Register (1786) listed Neptune with P. Martin, master and owner, and trade London–Jamaica, changing to London–Maryland. Lloyd's List, however, reported on 4 October 1784 that Neptune, Martin, master, from Suriname, had arrived at Hispaniola, and was expected to sail from Port-au-Prince to Quebec in mid-August.

Year	Master	Owner	Trade	Source & notes
1790	P. Martin	P. Martin	Waterford–Newfoundland	LR; small repairs 1789
1795	J. French	J. Jarrett	London transport	LR; good repair 1794
1800	T. Hopper	Jarrett (jr.)	London-Southern Fisheries	LR; good repair 1796

Lloyd's List reported on 5 June 1789 that Neptune, Martin, master, had had to put back into Waterford after having been out some three weeks. She had become very leaky.

Lloyd's Register for 1797 showed Neptune's master changing from J. French to T. Hopper, and her trade to London–South Seas. Neptune was mentioned in the Protection Lists.

Captain Hopper sailed Neptune in 1797 on a whaling voyage to the East Coast of Africa. She was at Delagoa Bay in late June 1798. There, on 28 June 1798, Captain Sever, of the East Indiaman Lion, chartered Neptune, Hopper, master, and two other English ships, London, Keen, master, and Eliza, Kerr, master, to carry Lion's cargo back to England. Lion had been carrying a cargo from Madras and Columbo to England when she had put into Delagoa Bay in distress. Despite the efforts of the three other English ships and three American ships there, Lion could not be saved.

Neptune and Eliza towed Lion farther up the Maputo River and then remained for some weeks. Eventually, all three British whalers left with only a portion of the cargo. The bulk of Lion's cargo was to go on Britannia, which had since arrived.
