= Middlesex (disambiguation) =

Middlesex is a historic county in southeast England.

Middlesex may also refer to:

== Places ==
=== Australia ===
- Middlesex, Tasmania, a locality in Australia
- Middlesex, Western Australia, a locality of the Shire of Manjimup

=== Belize ===
- Middlesex, Belize, a village in Stann Creek District, Belize

=== Canada ===
- Middlesex County, Ontario
  - Middlesex (federal electoral district)
  - Middlesex (Province of Canada electoral district)
  - Middlesex (provincial electoral district)
- Municipalities in Middlesex County:
  - Middlesex Centre
  - North Middlesex, Ontario
  - Southwest Middlesex, Ontario

=== Jamaica ===
- Middlesex County, Jamaica

=== United Kingdom ===
- Middlesex (UK Parliament constituency)

=== United States ===
- Middlesex, New Jersey
- Middlesex, New York
- Middlesex, North Carolina
- Middlesex, Vermont
- Middlesex, Virginia
- Middlesex Township, Butler County, Pennsylvania
- Middlesex Township, Cumberland County, Pennsylvania
- Middlesex County, Connecticut
- Middlesex County, Massachusetts
- Middlesex County, New Jersey
- Middlesex County, Virginia
- West Middlesex, Pennsylvania, a borough in Mercer County

== Literature ==
- Middlesex (novel), by Jeffrey Eugenides

== Other ==
- Middlesex (1783 EIC ship), an East Indiaman of the British East India Company
- Middlesex Canal, Massachusetts
- Middlesex County Cricket Club, St John's Wood, London
- Middlesex Guildhall, Westminster, London
- Middlesex Middle School, Connecticut
- Middlesex Plat Historic District, listed on the National Register of Historic Places in Polk County, Iowa
- Middlesex School, Concord, Massachusetts
- Middlesex University, based in Hendon, London
- North Middlesex University Hospital, Edmonton, London
- West Middlesex University Hospital, Isleworth, London
