= Lord George Bentinck (British Army officer) =

British Army officer and Member of Parliament

Lord George Bentinck (24 December 1715 – 1 March 1759) was a British Army officer and Member of Parliament (MP).

== Biography ==
Bentinck was the second son of Henry Bentinck, 1st Duke of Portland, and his wife Lady Elizabeth Noel, daughter of Wriothesley Noel, 2nd Earl of Gainsborough. He was educated at Eton College.

He received the appointment of ensign on 3 November 1735, and having been promoted on 12 April 1743 to the command of a company in the 1st Foot Guards, with the rank of lieutenant-colonel, he served at the battle of Dettingen in June that year. He obtained the appointment of aide-de-camp to the King on 12 March 1752, and the colonelcy of the 5th Regiment of Foot on 29 August 1754. He was afterward promoted to the rank of major-general, and at the 1754 general election he was elected as the Member of Parliament for the borough of Malmesbury in Wiltshire. He died at Bath on 2 March 1759.

Bentinck was elected at by-election in 1742 as a Member of Parliament for the borough of Droitwich. At the next general election, in 1747, he was elected as an MP for the rotten borough of Grampound. He held that seat until the 1754 general election, when he was elected for the borough of Malmesbury in Wiltshire. He held that seat until his death.

== Marriage ==
Lord George lived openly out of wedlock with a woman named Mary Davies of Hanwell for several years. They eventually married at the infamous Keith's Chapel in Westminster on 29 June 1753, at which time she became styled Lady George Bentinck. They were married by Rev. Alexander Keith – who performed clandestine marriages and baptisms – a few months after the passage of the Clandestine Marriages Act 1753, but before it came into force. His choice of wife was unacceptable to his family and they were scorned by his brother, William, Duke of Portland. He died six years later of gout, apparently having no children. He left his widow his fortune, equivalent to £774,000 in 2023.

Three weeks after his death, his aunt Lady Elizabeth Egerton (Note: The History of Parliament, citing the letter, identifies the author as "Lady Sophia Egerton, sister of the 1st Duke of Portland and wife of the bishop of Durham." However, the Duke of Portland's sister Lady Sophia married Henry Grey, 1st Duke of Kent, and had died in 1741. His sister Lady Elizabeth married Henry Egerton, Bishop of Hereford; their son John Egerton was the Bishop of Durham.) wrote a derogatory note about his widow, Lady George Bentinck, in a letter to a Dutch cousin, Count Willem Bentinck van Rhoon:

I never heard that Lord George Bentinck had any children by this woman, who after having been quite common about town he took into his keeping, and of late years has married. The Duke and Duchess of Portland would never pretend to credit the match, on which Lord George disgusted, seldom, if ever, visited at the Duke's his brother—and neither he, or his matrimonialised mistress have ever been taken notice of in the family. It is reported that Lord George's grief on this account contributed as much, if not more, to his death than the gout, and that he has left £40,000 (the whole of his fortune) to the present Lady George Bentinck.

— Lady Elizabeth Egerton, 23 March 1759

Just six weeks after his death, his widow remarried to a Joseph Griffiths, Esq., on 17 April 1759, at St Clement Danes, Westminster.
