= HMS Rattler (1783) =

Echo-class ship-sloop of the Royal Navy

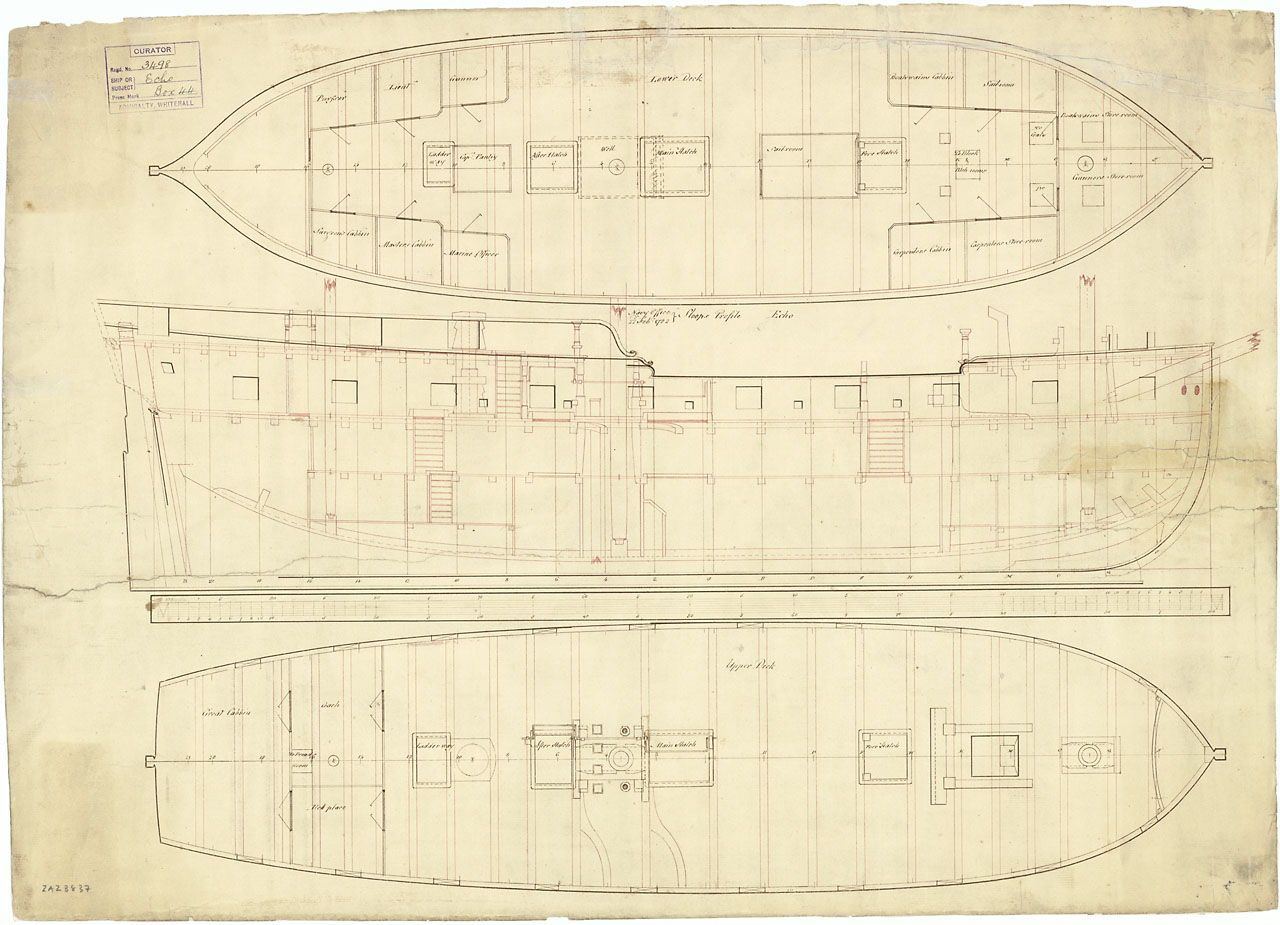
- Plans for HMS Rattler

History

Great Britain
- Name: Rattler
- Ordered: 28 December 1781
- Builder: Francis S. Willson, Sandgate
- Laid down: March 1782
- Launched: 22 March 1783
- Completed: By 21 July 1783 at Chatham
- Commissioned: April 1784
- Reinstated: October 1789
- Fate: Sold out of service 1792

Great Britain
- Name: Rattler
- Owner: 1792: Enderby & Sons; 1795:Charles John Wheeler et al.; 1798:Sinclair Halcrow; 1800:Thomas Wilson
- Acquired: 1792 by purchase
- Fate: Wrecked June 1830

General characteristics
- Class & type: Echo-class sloop
- Tons burthen: 317, or 34148/94, or 343 bm
- Length: Overall: 101 ft 4 in (30.9 m); Keel: 83 ft 4 1/2 in (25.4 m)
- Depth of hold: 12 ft 10 in (3.9 m)
- Propulsion: Sails
- Sail plan: ship-rigged
- Complement: Royal Navy:125; Mercantile service; 1797:30; 1800:30
- Armament: Royal Navy; Upper deck: 16 × 6-pounder guns; QD: 4 × 12-pounder carronades; Fc: 2 × 12-pounder carronades; Mercantile service; 1797: 14 × 6&4-pounder guns; 1800: 10 × 6-pounder + 4 × 9-pounder guns + 2 × 18-pounder carronades; 1805: 8 × 6-pounder guns + 2 × 18-pounder carronades

HMS Rattler was a 16-gun Echo-class ship-sloop of the Royal Navy. Launched in March 1783, she saw service in the Leeward Islands and Nova Scotia before being paid off in 1792 and sold to whaling company Samuel Enderby & Sons. She made two voyages as a whaler and two as a slave ship transporting enslaved people, before she was condemned in 1802 in the Americas as unseaworthy. She returned to service though, sailing as a whaler in the northern whale fishery, sailing out of Leith. She continued whaling until ice crushed her in June 1830.

== Construction ==
Rattler was one of six Echo-class sloops constructed in the early 1780s, principally for service in the imperial colonies. She was ordered in December 1781, to be constructed at Sandgate by shipwright Francis C. Willson, and launched on 22 March 1783.

Construction costs were £7,211, comprising £3,572 in builder's fees, £3,182 for fittings and £457 in dockyard expenses.

Rattler was built to the same technical drawings as the five other Echo-class ships, namely Brisk (1784), Calypso (1783), Echo (1782), Nautilus (1784), and Scorpion (1785). The class was designed to be 16-gun ship sloops with quarterdecks and forecastles.

All the Echo class used the same plans for frame, inboard profile, lines, stern, and upper and lower decks

== Caribbean service ==
Rattler was commissioned in April 1783 for service in the British Leeward Islands under Commander Wilfred Collingwood, assisting in enforcement of Great Britain's Navigation Acts against American trading vessels. On arrival in the Caribbean, Rattler joined the British fleet under the command of Captain Horatio Nelson, and including HMS Mediator whose captain was Wilfred Collingwood's brother Cuthbert.

In 1787 she was laid up to remove her copper bottom and replace it with wooden sheathing, despite the weaker protection this offered against infestation by shipworm. While the ship was being refitted Commander Collingwood was taken ill and died on 21 April 1787 en route to a hospital at Grenada. (Note: Letter from Captain Horatio Nelson to Captain Cuthbert Collingwood, 3 May 1787, cited in Newham Collingwood.) Rattler returned to sea later in April under Lieutenant James Wallis. After six months service Rattler returned to Britain for further refit and repair and was paid off.

Rattler was recommissioned in October 1789 under Lieutenant William Hope. He sailed her for Nova Scotia on 26 March 1790. In June 1790 Commander Jeremiah Beale replaced Hope.

Disposal: Rattler was paid off in 1792. She was sold at Woolwich to Messrs. Enderby & Sons on 6 September 1792.

== Mercantile service ==
Rattler underwent refitting in Perry's Blackwall Ship Yard. She first appeared in Lloyd's Register (LR), in the volume for 1792.

Year	Master	Owner	Trade	Source & notes
1792	James Colnet	S.Enderby	London–Southern fishery	LR; repairs 1792

1st whaling voyage (1792–1794): Captain McCowen sailed from London on 12 November 1792.

She left Portsmouth on 4 January 1793, with Captain James Colnett, master, bound for waters off Peru. James Colnett had been a lieutenant in the Royal Navy, but on half-pay. He had experience in the North Pacific, which made him attractive to Enderby. He wanted to return to active service and the Admiralty suggested that if he did this voyage it would return him to active service and recommend him for promotion.

In its voyage, the only British vessel encountered was the sealer Butterworth. Rattler sailed as far north as Cape St Lucas in Baja California. On the way she visited most of the western islands from Cape Horn north. The big discovery was the Galapagos Islands, which offered safe anchorages, and tortoises that represented fresh meat, and plentiful sperm whales. Colnett redoubled Cape Horn in August 1794, on her way back to England.

Rattler returned to England on 18 November 1794. Rattler returned with a poor cargo of only 48 tuns of sperm oil but with a detailed chart of the western side of South America and the Galapagos.

Enderby's sold Rattler and new owners to transport enslaved people.

1st voyage transporting enslaved people (1795–1796): Captain Robert Bibby sailed from London on 27 April 1795. Rattler arrived at the Gold Coast on 3 July 1795. She embarked captives at Cape Coast Castle and Anomabu and left Africa on 9 April 1796. She arrived at Kingston on 18 June. There she landed 468 captives. She arrived back at London on 16 October.

2nd whaling voyage (1798–1800): Captain Sinclair Halcrow acquired a letter of marque on 23 December 1797. He sailed from England in 1798. He returned to London on 24 June 1800.

2nd voyage transporting enslaved people (1800–1801): Captain Thomas Wilson acquired a letter of marque on 17 November 1800. He sailed from England on 25 December, bound for the Gold Coast. Rattler returned to Falmouth after having been chased on 1 February 1801, off Finisterre and having been forced to separate from her convoy and escort, HMS Fly.

Rattler arrived on the West Coast of Africa on 1 April 1801. She embarked captives at Cape Coast Castle and Accra and delivered them to Demerara, where she arrived in October. She landed some 280-300 captives. Rattler, late Wilson master, sailed from Demerara for London but around the end of January 1802, had to put into Grenada leaky. There she unloaded her cargo.

Rattler was condemned at Grenada as unseaworthy. The Register of Shipping for 1802 carried the annotation "Condemned" by her name.

However, Rattler returned to service, becoming a whaler in the northern whale fishery, sailing out of Leith.

Year	Master	Owner	Trade	Source & notes
1802	F.Wilson; J.Wright	Captain & Co.	London–Africa	LR; repairs 1792, & new sides 1800
1803	J.Wright	Balleanie (or Ballenie)	Leith–Davis Strait	LR; repairs 1792, new sides 1800, damages repaired 1803

On 25 July 1804, Rattler, Wright, master, returned to Leith with a full ship, having taken 10 "fish" (whales) in the Davis Strait.

Year	Master	Owner	Trade	Source & notes
1805	J.Wright; J.Davidson	Balleanie (or Ballenie)	Leith–Davis Strait	LR; repairs 1792, new sides 1800, damages repaired 1803

Year	Master	Where	Whales	Tuns whale oil
1805	Davidson	Davis Strait	5	
1806	Davidson	Davis Strait	8 large	
1807		Davis Strait	13	
1808		Davis Strait	3 or more	
1809	Stoddart	Davis Strait	Full	
1810	Stoddart		16	
1811			11	
1812	Stoddart	Davis Strait		
1813	Stoddart		1	
1814	Stodart	Greenland	7	46
1815	Stodart	Davis Strait	6	40.5
1816	Stodart	Davis Strait	11	66.5
1817	Stodart	Davis Strait	7	55
1818	Stodart	Davis Strait	5	33
1819	Stodart	Davis Strait	5	

One source reported that Rattler, of Leith, Stoddart, master had been wrecked during what for Leith had been a disastrous year. She was wrecked, but not until 1830.

Year	Master	Where	Whales	Tuns whale oil
1820	Stodart	Greenland	14	89
1821	Stodart	Greenland	14	72.5
1822	Stodart	Greenland	12	75
1823	Stodart	Greenland	9	54
1824	Stodart	Davis Strait	9 (or 7)	54 (or 90)
1825	Stodart	Davis Strait	1	6
1826	Stodart	Davis Strait	3	17.5
1827	Stodart		12.5 (or 8)	86 (or 110)
1828	Stodart	Davis Strait	15	93.5
1829	Stodart	Davis Strait	7 (or 9)	41.5
1830	Stodart	Davis Strait	0	0

Year	Master	Owner	Trade	Source & notes
1830	Stodart	White & Co.	Leith–Davis Strait	LR; repairs 1825

== Fate ==
Rattler, Stodart (or Stoddard), master, was lost on 25 or 28 June 1830, crushed by ice.

This was the worst year in the history of British Arctic whaling. Leith alone lost two of its seven whalers, one vessel returned "clean", i.e., it had not caught anything, and the remaining four vessels had only four whales (50 tons of whale oil) between them.
