= Union (1803 EIC ship) =

History

United Kingdom
- Name: Union
- Owner: EIC voyages #1-3: Henry Callender; EIC voyage #4: Miss Jane Chrystie; EIC voyages #5-6: William Hamilton; EIC voyages #7-8: John Campbell.
- Builder: Randall, Rotherhithe
- Launched: 8 January 1803
- Fate: Sold in 1819 for breaking up

General characteristics
- Tons burthen: 550, or 570, or 57077/94 (bm)
- Length: Overall:125 ft 9 1/2 in (38.3 m); Keel:100 ft 8 3/4 in (30.7 m)
- Beam: 32 ft 1 in (9.8 m)
- Depth of hold: 16 ft 0 in (4.9 m)
- Complement: 50
- Armament: 18 × 12-pounder guns
- Notes: Two decks

Union was an East Indiaman that made eight voyages for the British East India Company (EIC) between her launching in 1803 and her sale for breaking up in 1819.

== Career ==
=== EIC voyage #1 (1803-1804) ===
Captain John Mackintosh sailed from The Downs on 30 March 1803, bound for Madras. He was issued a letter of marque on 16 July, i.e., after he had left. Union arrived at Madras on 16 August, and left on 22 October. She reached St Helena on 12 January 1804, and arrived at the Downs on 5 April.

=== EIC voyage #2 (1804-1806) ===
Captain Mackintosh sailed from Portsmouth on 4 September 1804, bound for St Helena and Bengal. Union was at Madeira on 27 September and St Helena on 23 December. She reached Diamond Harbour on 28 April 1805. Homeward bound, she was at Saugor on 26 August. She left Bengal on 29 August in company with the frigate HMS Howe, but they parted a few days later; Union reached St Helena on 30 November. While Union was at St Helena the whaler Iris came in and was condemned at unseaworthy. Union carried her cargo of oil back to England. Union reached Cork on 6 Apr 1806, and arrived at the Downs on 27 April.

=== EIC voyage #3 (1806-1808) ===
Captain Mackintosh sailed from Plymouth on 24 September 1806, bound for Madras and Bengal.

On 21 December she parted from her consort, Skelton Castle. Mackintosh had signalled that he wanted to put into the Cape of Good Hope for water and fresh provisions. Captain Vaughn of Skelton Castle replied that he did not need either and that he would take advantage off the fair winds and go on to Madras. It appears that Vaughn wanted Skelton Castle to be the first ship of the season to arrive in India and so benefit his own cargo. Skelton Castle disappeared without a trace.

Union reached the Cape on 22 December and Madras on 11 March 1807. She arrived at Diamond Harbour on 6 April and was at Calcutta on 4 July. Homeward bound, she was at Saugor on 16 September, leaving it on 11 October. She stopped at Madras on 22 October, and was at the Cape on 30 December. She reached St Helena on 25 January 1808, and arrived at the Downs on 5 April.

=== EIC voyage #4 (1808-1810) ===
Captain George Simpson sailed from Portsmouth on 17 September 1808, bound for Madras and Bengal. Union was at Madeira on 28 September, and reached Madras on 11 February 1809. She arrived at Calcutta on 23 March. Homeward bound, she was at Diamond Harbour on 4 July and Saugor on 25 August. She was at Madras from 24 September to 14 October. She reached the Cape on 26 December and St Helena on 28 January 1810; she arrived at The Downs on 15 April.

=== EIC voyage #5 (1811-1812) ===
Captain Robert Rankine sailed from Portsmouth on 12 March 1811, bound for Bombay, Madras, and Bengal. Union was at Madeira on 4 April and reached Bombay on 24 July. She reached Madras on 3 September and arrived at Calcutta on 20 October. Homeward bound, left Calcutta on 16 December, and was at Saugor on 13 February 1812. She arrived at St Helena on 12 May, and left on the 24th with the fleet under escort by HMS Phaeton, but parted from them a few days later. Union arrived at the Downs on 25 July.

=== EIC voyage #6 (1813-1814) ===
Captain Rankine sailed from Portsmouth on 18 March 1813, bound for St Helena and Bengal, but was at Torbay on 25 March. Union reached St Helena on 22 June, and arrived at Calcutta on 10 November. Homeward bound, she was at Saugor on 24 February 1814 and left on 11 March.

Union traveled in company with Marchioness of Exeter and "Little Pitt", (Note: It is not clear which vessel "Little Pitt" was. There was no EIC vessel by that name. Neither of the two EIC vessels named William Pitt could be the vessel in question: one had foundered in December 1813 and the other had arrived back in London in August 1813.) and under escort by the 74-gun third rate HMS Danmark. Near the Cape of Good Hope a three-day hurricane hit the convoy. Union threw her 22 guns and £20,000 of silk indigo overboard to lighten her. Captain Rankine had been unwell for some weeks and was unable to exit his cabin, which flooded with water. By the time the crew was able to reach him after the three days, he was found dead, presumed drowned. Union reached the Cape, where Captain Rankine was buried. "Little Pitt" never arrived and was presumed to have foundered. Marchioness of Exeter and Danmark, also "much distressed", arrived three days after Union.

Union, "late Rankin" had reached the Cape on 18 June. Lloyd's List further reported that she had thrown part of her cargo overboard in bad weather. It also reported that Marchioness of Exeter had arrived two days before Union.

Union's first officer was William Lock, and presumably it was he that took command. She left the Cape on 25 August, was at St Helena on 6 September, and arrived at the Downs on 16 November.

=== EIC voyage #7 (1815-1816) ===
Captain John Edward Johnson sailed from The Downs on 22 May 1815, bound for Bengal and Bencoolen. Union was at Madeira on 10 June and at Diamond Harbour on 16 November; she arrived at Calcutta on 8 December. Continuing her voyage, she was at Saugor on 24 February 1816, and reached Bencoolen on 28 April. She visited Batavia on 14 May. She stopped at Indremayo on 28 June before returning to Batavia on 21 July. She left Batavia on 10 August, reached St Helena on 17 October, and arrived at the Downs on 16 December.

=== EIC voyage #8 (1817-1818) ===
Captain Johnson sailed from The Downs on 6 May 1817, bound for Bengal and Madras. Union was at Madeira on 21 May and arrived at Diamond Harbour on 23 September. She left Diamond Harbour on 28 January 1818 and by 13 February was in Coringa Roads. She reached Madras on 6 March, Colombo on 7 April, the Cape on 18 June, and St Helena on 17 July. She arrived at the Downs on 16 September.

== Fate ==
Union was sold in 1819 for breaking up.
