= Eliza (1816 ship) =

History

United Kingdom
- Name: Eliza
- Owner: Various
- Builder: Calcutta
- Launched: 1816
- Fate: Still listed in 1860

General characteristics
- Tons burthen: 639, or 682 (bm)
- Propulsion: Sail

Eliza was built in Calcutta, India, in 1816. She performed many voyages between England and India under a license from the British East India Company (EIC), and then as a free trader. She also made one voyage on behalf of the EIC. She was still listed in 1860.

== Career ==
A list of vessels trading with India in Lloyd's Register for 1825 shows Eliza (1815 ship), D. Sutton, master and owner, sailing for Madras on 28 March 1824. That same day Eliza (1804 ship), W. Faith master, Faith, owner, sailed for Bombay. Lloyd's Register for 1825 also shows Eliza (1804)'s master as T. Ward, her owner as Palmer & Co., and her trade as London—Madras.

Captain David Sutton sailed Eliza from the Downs on 10 July 1829. She arrived at Calcutta on 24 November. Homeward bound, she was at Saugor on 26 February 1830, the Cape of Good Hope on 6 May, and St Helena on 6 June. She arrived back at the Downs on 2 August. (Note: The British Library directory of EIC vessels and voyages conflates this Eliza with Eliza (1804).)

Year	Master	Owner	Trade	Notes
1830	D. Sutton	D. Sutton––	London—Calcutta	639 tons (bm)
1833	Sutton	Captain & Co.	London-Calcutta	682 tons (bm);
1835				NA
1836	Campbell	Campbell		682 tons (bm); Copper defective (1831)
1837	Campbell	Palmer & Co.	London-India	682 tons (bm); London registry
1840	Farquarson	Farquarson	London—Calcutta	Calcutta-built, 682; London registry
1845	Patterson	Farquarson & McCarthy	London—China; London—Bombay	
1850	Patterson	Haviside	London	
1855	H. Barman	Sturdee	London—India	
1860	H. Barman	Sturdee	London	

== Notes and citations ==
Notes

Citations
