= Perseverance (1801 whaling ship) =

UK whaling ship 1801–1841

History

United Kingdom
- Name: Perseverance
- Builder: Rotherhithe
- Launched: 1801
- Fate: Broken up 1841

General characteristics
- Tons burthen: 400, or 412, or 414, and later 423 (bm)
- Propulsion: Sail
- Complement: 1801:36; 1803:32; 1804:30; 1806:30; 1812:30
- Armament: 1801:16 × 9-pounder guns + 4 swivel guns; 1803:16 × 12-pounder guns + 16 swivels; 1804:16 × 9-pounder guns + 6 swivels; 1806:16 × 9-pounder guns + 6 swivels; 1812:2 × 12-pounder guns + 16 × 9-pounder carronades

Perseverance (or Perserverance) was launched on the Thames in 1801. She then spent her entire career of 16 voyages as a whaler. Early in her career a French privateer captured her, but the British Royal Navy quickly recaptured her. Perseverance would herself later capture a vessel too. She was broken up in 1841.

== Career ==
Perseverance entered Lloyd's Register in 1801 with W. Stevers, master, Mellish, owner, and trade London–Southern Fisheries.

Voyage #1 (1801–1802): Captain William Stavers received a letter of marque on 27 February 1801. On 9 March he sailed Perseverance for Walvis Bay. She was at Walvis Bay in August, together with a number of other whalers such as Charming Kitty, Indispensable, and Elligood, and that they were generally successful. Perseverance then was at St Helena on 19 September, and the coast of Brazil in December. She returned to England on 22 May 1802 with 160 tuns of oil.

In 1802, Perseverance was valued at £14,000.

Voyage #2 (1802–1803): Stavers sailed on 31 August 1802 for the Brazil Banks, and was there in February 1803, together with Duchess of Portland and Ferret. War with France resumed in May 1803, increasing the risks to whalers and other merchant vessels. Stavers received a letter of marque on 29 June. In October 1803, the French privateer Vaillant captured Perseverance. However, HMS Sirius recaptured her on 28 October. On 4 November Perseverance was at St Helena and she returned to England on 29 November.

Voyage #3 (1804–1806): Captain William Irish received a letter of marque on 28 January 1804, and sailed Perseverance from England on 3 February, bound for Timor. She was there by July. Between 10 and 15 August 1804 she was among a number of whalers from London that were well at Timor, including Iris, Elliott, Eliza, and others.

Homeward bound, she left St Helena on 31 January 1806, and arrived in England on 28 April.

Voyage #4 (1806–1809): Captain William Stavers received a letter of marque on 23 July 1806. Perseverance was mentioned in the 1806 list. He sailed from England on 9 August, bound for the Pacific Ocean. He was reported to have been round Cape Horn in March 1807. In June Perseverance captured the vessel Juno off the coast of Peru as Juno was sailing to Lima. Juno arrived at Portsmouth in early December. In January 1808 Perseverance was at the Galapagos Islands. Homeward bound, she left St Helena on 11 December 1808. She returned to England on 31 January 1809.

Voyage #5 (1809–1811): Captain Thomas Williamson left England on 1 June 1809, bound for Peru. He returned on 9 August 1811 with over 1900 barrels of sperm oil. The vessel and crew were mentioned in the Protection Lists for 1809, but no master was listed.

Voyage #6 (1811–1814): After war with America broke out in July Captain Henry King received a letter of marque against the United States of America. He left England in late 1811 and returned on 4 May 1814. Perseverance was at Coquimbo i 1813, where she was described as an armed British whaler.

In 1813, the British East India Company (EIC) had lost its monopoly on the trade between India and Britain. British ships were then free to sail to India or the Indian Ocean under a licence from the EIC. Perseverence's owners applied for a licence to sail to certain ports in the East Indies under the provisions for whalers. They applied on 16 August 1814, and received the licence on 18 August.

Voyage #7 (1814–1816): King sailed again in August 1814, bound for Peru. He returned on 2 May 1816 with 400 casks of whale oil.

Voyage #8 (1816–1818): William Stavers sailed from England on 5 October 1816. He died during the voyage, killed by the strike of a whale's tail. Stavers was in a whale boat on the Brazil Banks and trying to kill a cachalot. A strike from the whale's fluke killed one oarsman, and threw Stavers into the sea, where his body floated, insensible. His body was retrieved and brought back on Perseverance. Though there wee no external marks of injury, all attempts to revive him were futile. William Stavers' son, Thomas Reed Stavers, was serving on Perseverance as a boatsteerer, and it was he that pulled his father's body from the sea.

Thomas Cooksey replace Captain Staver as master. Perseverance returned to England on 23 July 1818 with 550 casks.

Voyage #9 (1818–1821): Captain Alexander Luke sailed from England on 7 October 1818 and returned on 17 April 1821 with 600 casks.

Voyage #10 (1821–1824): Captain Luke, or J. Lieke was master of Perseverance in 1821. He sailed from England on 16 August 1821, bound for the Pacific. He returned on 9 January 1824 with 520 casks.

Voyage #11 (1824–1827): Captain William Mott sailed from England on 5 May 1824. Perseverance was at Honolulu on 21 May 1826. She returned to England on 6 May 1827 with 580 casks.

Voyage #12 (1827–1829): Captain Underwood left England on 3 August 1827, bound for Peru. At some point command changed to Mayle. Perseverance returned to England on 4 September 1829 with 530 casks.

Voyage #13 (1829–1831): Captain "Male" left England on 3 December 1829 and returned on 21 October 1831.

Voyage #14 (1832–1835): Captain Male/Mole left England on 25 March 1832, bound for Peru. He probably returned in late 1835.

Between her 14th and 15th voyages, Perseverance's ownership changed as Joseph Somes acquired her.

Voyage #15 (1836–1838): Captain T. Craddock sailed from England on 24 January 1836, bound for Peru. He returned on 16 April 1838 with 40 casks (21 tuns) of oil.

Voyage #16 (1838–1841): Captain William Brown Nicholson sailed from England on 23 July 1838. Perseverance was reported at Mindano, Samboayana, and "Buutan". She returned on 30 July 1841 with 243 tuns of oil.

== Fate ==
Perseverance was broken up on her return from her last voyage.
