= Iris (1803 ship) =

British whaling ship (1803-1805)

History

France
- Launched: 1794
- Fate: Transferred to British ownership in 1803

United Kingdom
- Name: Iris
- Owner: Hurry & Co.
- Acquired: 1803 (by purchase?)
- Fate: Condemned 1805

General characteristics
- Tons burthen: 357, or 395 (bm)
- Complement: 30
- Armament: 10 × 6-pounder guns + 6 swivel guns

Iris was launched in France in 1794 and came into British hands in 1803, probably by purchase. She became a whaler in the British southern whale fishery. In 1805 she made an unsuccessful attack on a Batavian vessel. Iris was condemned as unseaworthy in late 1805 on her way home after her first voyage as a whaler.

== Career ==
Captain William Clark received a letter of marque on 23 May 1803. Iris appears in the Register of Shipping for 1804 with W. Clark, master, Hurry & Co. owner, and trade Plymouth–Southern Fishery. She also underwritten a good repair in 1803.

Captain Clark (or Clarke) sailed from England in July, bound for Timor. Between 10 and 15 August 1804 she was among a number of whalers from London that were well at Timor, including Perseverance, Elliott, Eliza, and others.

In February 1805 Captain Clarke found out from Policy, and another vessel, now Sophia, that was a prize to Policy, that a valuable Batavian vessel was coming from Batavia on her way to Banda. Iris intercepted the Batavian near Omba Island and gave chase, though her quarry had more guns and a larger crew. Iris attempted to board the Batavian, but she had too few crew men to prevail. After Clarke was badly wounded Iris's chief office broke off the engagement; the Batavian maintained her cannon fire until Iris was out of range, but chose not to pursue.

== Fate ==
Iris was homeward bound from the southern fishery when she stopped at Saint Helena. There she was condemned in 1805 as unseaworthy. The East Indiaman Union took Iris's cargo of oil home.
