= Duchess of Portland (1826 ship) =

History

United Kingdom
- Name: Duchess of Portland
- Namesake: Duchess of Portland
- Builder: Robert Thomson, Troon
- Launched: 1826
- Fate: Foundered 12 February 1867

General characteristics
- Tonnage: 158 N/GRT
- Tons burthen: 173 (bm)
- Length: 77 ft 6 in (23.6 m)
- Beam: 22 ft 7 in (6.9 m)
- Depth: 13 ft 10 in (4.2 m)
- Propulsion: Sail

Duchess of Portland was launched at Troon in 1826. In the next 40-some years she sailed as a West Indiaman, and then around Britain. In 1831 she survived a maritime incident. She foundered in 1867.

== Career ==
Duchess of Portland first appeared in Lloyd's Register (LR) in 1826,

Year	Master	Owner	Trade	Source
1826	J.Hill	J.Hill	Greenock–New York	LR
1831	M'Ghie; R.Miller	J.Hill&Co.	Falmouth	LR

On 13 August 1831 Duchess of Portland, Miller, master, encountered a violent hurricane as she was sailing for England from Aux Cayes. The hurricane threw her on her beam ends and she stayed that way for eight hours. She lost one of her boats, several sails, and was obliged to cut away her spare spars. She arrived at Falmouth on 28 September.

Year	Master	Owner	Trade	Homeport	Source & notes
1835	R.Millar			Glasgow	LR
1840	D.Kerr	M'Gill & Co	Clyde–Trinidad	Glasgow	LR; small repairs 1839
1845	P.Brown; G.Dickson	M'Gill & Co.	Clyde–Saint Kitts; Clyde–Trinidad	Glasgow	LR; large repair 1843 & damages repaired 1846
1850	D.Ross	M'Gill & Co.			LR
1855	Micklreid	Turnock & Co.	London	Leith	LR; large repair 1843 & small repairs 1848 & 1850
1860	Micklreid	Turnock & Co.	London	Leith	LR; large repair 1843 & small repairs 1848 & 1850
1862	Micklreid		London; Shields		LR; large repair 1843 & small repairs 1848 & 1850

Duchess of Portland was last listed in Lloyd's Register in 1862. However, in December 1865 she stranded at Bridlington but was later refloated.

== Fate ==
Duchess of Portland foundered 15 miles off Hartlepool on 12 February 1867 after taking in water. Crew were saved from the ship's boat. She had been sailing from Sunderland to Le Conquet with a cargo of coal. Her British registry was cancelled in 1869.
