= Windsor Castle (1783 ship) =

1783 ship

History

Great Britain
- Name: Windsor Castle
- Namesake: Windsor Castle
- Builder: Whitby (Note: Unfortunately, Windsor Castle is not listed in Weatherill.)
- Launched: 1783
- Captured: Foundered 1803

General characteristics
- Tons burthen: 300, or 305, or 316 (bm)
- Propulsion: Sail
- Complement: 1797:15; 1801:25
- Armament: 1797:14 × 3&6&9-pounder guns; 1801:12 × 9-pounder guns

Windsor Castle was launched at Whitby in 1783. Initially she was primarily a West Indiaman. Then from 1797, she made five voyages as a slave ship in the triangular trade in enslaved people. She foundered off Bermuda in 1803, after having disembarked her captives.

== Career ==
Windsor Castle first appeared in Lloyd's Register (LR) in 1783, with G. Young, master, G. Tarbut, owner, and trade London–Jamaica.

Year	Master	Owner	Trade	Source & notes
1786	G. Young	G. Tarbutt	London–Jamaica	LR
1790	Blackburn	G.Tarbutt	London–Jamaica	LR; small repairs 1789
1796	Crawford	Crawford	London transport	LR; repairs 1789 & good repair 1795
1798	T. Jones	Case & Co.	Liverpool–Africa	LR; repairs 1789, good repair 1795, and new deck & repairs 1798

From 1797 on, Windsor Castle made five voyages as a slave ship based out of Liverpool.

Slave voyage #1 (1797–1798): Captain Thomas Jones acquired a letter of marque on 13 March 1797. He sailed from Liverpool on 10 April, bound for West Africa. In 1797, 104 vessels sailed from British ports to transport enslaved people from Africa to the West Indies; 90 of these vessels came from Liverpool.

Windsor Castle acquired captives first at New Calabar and then at Bonny. She arrived at Kingston Jamaica on 18 December. There she disembarked 435 captives. She sailed from Kingston on 18 February 1798, and arrived back at Liverpool on 19 April. She had left with 39 crew members and had 11 crew deaths on the voyage.

Slave voyage #2 (1798–1799): Captain Jones sailed from Liverpool on 15 August 1798, bound for West Africa. In 1798, 160 vessels sailed from British ports to transport enslaved people from Africa to the West Indies; 149 of these vessels came from Liverpool.

Windsor Castle acquired captives at Calabar and Bonny, and arrived at Kingston on 72 May 1799. There she landed 420 captives. She sailed from Kingston on 15 July, and arrived back at Liverpool on 3 October. She had left with 50 crew members and had 18 crew deaths on the voyage.

Slave voyage #3 (1800–1801): Captain Jones sailed from Liverpool on 7 May 1800, bound for West Africa. In 1800, 133 vessels sailed from British ports to transport enslaved people from Africa to the West Indies; 120 of these vessels came from Liverpool.

Windsor Castle acquired captives at Calabar and delivered them to Suriname on 2 December. She sailed from Suriname on 1 February 1801, and arrived back at Liverpool on 20 April. She had left with 48 crew members and had nine crew deaths on the voyage.

Slave voyage #4 (1801–1802): Captain Gilbert Curry acquired a letter of marque on 8 July 1801. He sailed from Liverpool on 1 July 1801, bound for West Africa. In 1801, 147 vessels sailed from British ports to transport enslaved people from Africa to the West Indies; 122 of these vessels came from Liverpool.

Windsor Castle acquired captives at Calabar and delivered them to Trinidad, where she arrived on 10 February 1802. There she landed 280 captives. She arrived back at Liverpool on 2 May 1802. She had left with 48 crew members and had four crew deaths on the voyage.

Slave voyage #5 (1802–1803): Captain John Bean sailed from Liverpool on 13 October 1802. Because he left during the Peace of Amiens, he did not acquire a letter of marque. In 1801, 155 vessels sailed from British ports to transport enslaved people from Africa to the West Indies; 122 of these vessels came from Liverpool.

It is not clear where Windsor Castle acquired captives, but she delivered them to Antigua and St Thomas. She arrived at St Thomas on 23 May 1803, and landed some 289 captives. She had left Liverpool with 34 crew members and had nine crew deaths on the voyage.

== Loss ==
Lloyd's List reported on 15 November 1803, that Windsor Castle, which had been sailing from St Thomas to Liverpool, had foundered off Bermuda. Eliza, Moon, master, had rescued the crew and taken them to Lancaster. Eliza arrived at Lancaster on 13 November. (Note: Eliza, of 223 tons (bm) had been launched at Lancaster in 1803. LR reported her master as J. Moon, her owner as Worswick, and her trade as Lancaster–Dominica.)

In 1803, eleven British vessels that transported enslaved people were lost. One of these was lost on the homeward–bound leg of her voyage.
