= Eliza (1802 ship) =

UK whaler 1802–1822

History

United Kingdom
- Name: Eliza
- Owner: 1802: John Jarrett, Lewis Llewellyn, Magnus Smith, William Dagg; 1805: Thomas Blyth, Lewis Llewellyn, Magnus Smith, John & Thomas Hullett, William Dagg; 1810:John & Thomas Hullett, John Mather, Richard & Edward Symes; 1813:Thomas Blyth & Francis Todrig; 1814: Blythe
- Fate: Last listed in 1824
- Notes: This Eliza is often confused with two other whalers that operated at the same time: Eliza (1789 ship) and Eliza (1800 ship)

General characteristics
- Tons burthen: 264, or 265 (bm)

Eliza was a French prize that made nine voyages as a whaler between 1802 and 1822. She is last listed in 1824.

== Career ==
Eliza enters Lloyd's Register in 1892 with Lewellin, master, Jarrett, owner, and trade London–South Seas.

Whaling voyage #1 (1802–1804): Captain Lewis Llewellyn sailed from England on 24 August 1802. Eliza was at the Galapagos in September 1803. She returned to England on 20 March 1805.

Whaling voyage #2 (1805–1806): Captain Lewellyn sailed again in 1805 and returned on 31 October 1806.

Eliza appears in Lloyd's Register in 1808, having undergone damage repairs in 1804, and a thorough repair in 1807. Her master was Alexander, her owner Lavage & Co., and trade London–South Seas whale fishery.

Whaling voyage #3 (1807–1809): Captain Alexander sailed from England on 13 February 1807. Eliza was at the Cape of Good Hope on 9 October 1808, Saldanha Bay on 30 November, and St Helena on 30 December. She left St Helena on 3 February 1809 for London. At some point Captain Alexander died and Captain Garbutt replaced him. Eliza arrived at England on 12 April.

Whaling voyage #4 (1810–1812): Captain Jonathan Clarke sailed from London on 9 February 1810, bound for Timor. Eliza left Spithead with a convoy in May. By 9 January 1811 she was near Timor. She left St Helena on 7 July 1812 with a convoy for England. She arrived back at England on 16 September.

Whaling voyage #5 (1813–1814): Captain John Walker sailed from England on 21 April 1813. By 26 March 1814 Eliza was at St Helena; she returned to England on 29 May.

Whaling voyage #6 (1814–1816): Captain Walker sailed from England in 1814, bound for Peru. Eliza sailed via St Helena. She returned to England on 29 February 1816 with 400 casks of whale oil.

Whaling voyage #7 (1816–1817): Captain Walker sailed Eliza from England on 19 April 1816, bound for Peru. Homeward bound, she was off the coast of Patagonia on 18 March 1817, and returned to England on 25 May.

Whaling voyage #8 (1817–1821): Eliza left England on 9 September 1817 and returned on 6 April 1821.

Whaling voyage #9 (1821–1822): Captain Walker sailed from England on 3 July 1821. Eliza returned on 30 August 1822 with 50 casks of whale oil and 4440 seal skins.

Eliza was last listed in the Register of Shipping in 1824 with J. Walker, master, Blythe, owner, and trade London–South Seas.
