= Westmoreland (1783 ship) =

History

Great Britain
- Name: Westmoreland
- Builder: Yarmouth
- Launched: 1783
- Captured: c. March 1805

General characteristics
- Tons burthen: 375, or 406, or 412 (bm)
- Complement: 1800:37; 1803:25; 1805:40
- Armament: 1800: 18 × 9-pounder guns; 1803: 10 × 9-pounder guns; 1805: 16 × 9-pounder guns

Westmoreland was launched in Yarmouth in 1783. Between 1800 and 1804, she made two voyages as a slave ship in the triangular trade in enslaved people. A French privateer captured her during her second voyage but the Royal Navy recaptured her and she completed her voyage. The registers continued to carry her for a few years but with stale data. She actually made a voyage in 1805, to Demerara. On her way a privateer captured her.

== Career ==
Westmoreland first appeared in Lloyd's Register (LR) in 1783, sailing as a West Indiaman.

Year	Master	Owner	Trade	Source & notes
1783	W.Brown	T.Mangles	London–Jamaica	LR
1795	Thomas	Webster	London–Cork; Cork–Jamaica	LR
1797	Thomas	Webster	Cork–Jamaica	LR

On 26 February 1796, Westmoreland was at 37°30′N 45°53′W and part of a convoy bound for London. She had lost her main and mizzen masts and was bearing for Antigua. She arrived at Antigua. She arrived at Deal at end-August.

Westmoreland was registered at Whitby in 1797, with owners Robtert Gill, m.m., Henry Barrick, sen., and Jn. Watson.

In 1797, Westmoreland was on her way from Jamaica to London when she put into Hampton Roads, Virginia. By end-December she arrived back at Dover and on 2 January 1798, she arrived at Gravesend.

She was registered at Liverpool in February 1800.

Year	Master	Owner	Trade	Source & notes
1798		Jameson	London–Jamaica	LR
1799	F.Rolston	Gill & Co.	Hull–Memel	LR; good repair 1798
1800	F.Rolton; Catteral	Gill; Bell & Co.	Hull–Memel; Liverpool–Africa	Register of Shipping; large repair 1799

Westmoreland was re-registered at Liverpool in February 1800.

1st voyage transporting enslaved people (1800–1801): Captain Robert Catterall acquired a letter of marque on 2 April 1800. He sailed from Liverpool on 20 April. In 1800, 133 vessels sailed from English ports, bound for Africa to acquire and transport enslaved people; 120 of these vessels sailed from Liverpool.

Westmoreland acquired captives in West Africa and arrived at Kingston on 9 January 1801, with 368. She sailed from Kingston on 4 April, and arrived back at Liverpool on 4 June. She had left Liverpool with 40 crew members, had arrived at Kingston with 36, and had returned to Liverpool having suffered four crew deaths on her voyage.

2nd voyage transporting enslaved people (1803–1804): Captain Timothy Boardman acquired a letter of marque on 11 July 1823. Westmoreland left Liverpool on 9 January 1803. In 1803, 99 vessels sailed from English ports, bound for Africa to acquire and transport enslaved people; 83 of these vessels sailed from Liverpool.

Westmoreland acquired captives in Gabon. As she was sailing to the West Indies, the privateer General Ernouf captured her, but HMS Cyane recaptured her on 2 January 1804, or just before. Westmoreland arrived at Barbados on 5 January, with 192 captives. At some point Captain Edward Kelly replaced Boardman. Westmoreland, Kelly, master, arrived in Liverpool in early July. She had left Liverpool with 37 crew members and she suffered six crew deaths on her voyage.

== Fate ==
Although both LR and the Register of Shipping carried Westmoreland with data stale since 1804, it appears that Captain Baynes Reed acquired a letter of marque on 26 March 1805. He sailed for Demerara. In March or so, the French privateer Bon, of Bordeaux, captured Westmoreland. In June Lloyd's List reported that Commerce, of Liverpool, had arrived in Virginia. On her way a Spanish privateer had boarded her and transferred to her Reed and his crew.
