= Eliza (shipwreck) =

Longboat lost at sea

History

Australia
- Name: Eliza
- Fate: Disappeared 1797

General characteristics
- Class & type: sloop-rigged longboat
- Tons burthen: 10

Eliza was a sloop-rigged longboat that was involved in the rescue of the survivors of the wreck of Sydney Cove in 1797.

Eliza sailed from Sydney on 30 May 1797 to Preservation Island in Bass Strait. On arrival Eliza took on board several survivors and some cargo. Under the command of Archibald Armstrong (who was sailing master aboard HMS Supply, Eliza sailed for Sydney but was never seen again.

In 1803 HMS Calcutta found a large boat between Port Phillip and Westernport and it was thought that it was Eliza.
