= Iris (1783 ship) =

18th-century British slave ship

History

Great Britain
- Name: Iris
- Owner: 1783:Backhouse (Note: The full list was: William Rutson, Thomas & John Backhouse, John & Thomas Hodgson, and William Dickson.); 1787:Potter (Note: The full list was: John Galley, Peter Potter, Thomas Pickop, Charles Bromfield, and Elijah Cobham.); 1790:Fisher & Birch (Note: The full list was: Ralph Fisher, Joseph Birch, James Wedderburn, and James Gibson.)
- Builder: Liverpool
- Launched: 1783
- Fate: Condemned December 1800

General characteristics
- Tons burthen: 260, or 268, or 285 (bm)
- Length: 93 ft 6 in (28.5 m)
- Beam: 26 ft 0 in (7.9 m)
- Propulsion: Sail
- Complement: 1795:25, or 27; 1797:20; 1799:
- Armament: 1795: 10 × 4-pounder guns; 1797:12 × 4-pounder guns; 1799:6 × 18-pounder
- Notes: Two decks; three masts

Iris was launched at Liverpool as a slave ship in the triangular trade in enslaved people. She made eight voyages (1783–1800) transporting captives from West Africa to the Caribbean. She also made one voyage for the British East India Company (EIC) to Bengal and back (1795-1796). She was condemned in Jamaica in December 1800 as unseaworthy.

== Career ==
Iris entered Lloyd's Register in 1783, with Kirvinton, master, Backhouse, owner, and trade Liverpool–Africa.

1st voyage transporting enslaved people (1783-1785): Captain Thomas Holliday sailed from Liverpool on 16 November 1783, bound for the Gold Coast with a crew of 51. Iris started gathering her captives on 6 February 1784, at Cape Coast Castle. She sailed from Africa on 28 August and arrived at Jamaica on 30 October. She had embarked 500 captives and she disembarked 448, for a loss rate of 10.4%. On 17 December, Iris sailed from Jamaica; she arrived back at Liverpool on 3 February 1785.

2nd voyage transporting enslaved people (1787-1789): Captain Peter Potter sailed from Liverpool on 20 March 1787, bound for the Bight of Biafra and Gulf of Guinea islands. Iris gathered her captives at Calabar and arrived at Montego Bay on 5 September 1788, with 423 captives. She had left Liverpool with 42 crew members and had lost 10 on the voyage. Iris left Jamaica on 24 November, and arrived at Liverpool on 5 February 1789.

3rd voyage transporting enslaved people (1790-1791): Captain George Greaves sailed from Liverpool on 12 April 1790, bound for the Bight of Biafra. Iris arrived at Montego Bay on 26 November 1790, with 401 captives. She had a crew of 31, of whom seven died. Iris left Jamaica on 21 January 1791, and arrived at Liverpool on 18 March 1791.

4th voyage transporting enslaved people (1791-1792): Captain Greaves sailed from Liverpool on 26 June 1791, bound for the Bight of Biafra. She arrived at Africa on 24 August 1791, and gathered her captives at Bonny Island. She left Africa on 5 January 1792, and arrived at Jamaica on 28 February 1792. She had embarked 350 captives and landed 345, for a loss rate of 1.4%. She had a crew of 30 men, three of whom died on the voyage. Iris arrived back at Liverpool on 3 June 1792.

After the passage of Dolben's Act, masters received a bonus of £100 for a mortality rate of under 2%; the ship's surgeon received £50. For a mortality rate between two and three per cent, the bonus was halved. There was no bonus if mortality exceeded 3%.

5th voyage transporting enslaved people (1792-1793): Captain Thomas Huson sailed from Liverpool on 8 July 1792, bound for the Gold Coast. Iris started gathering her captives at Anomabu on 1 September. She sailed from Africa on 1 April 1793, and arrived at St Vincent on 8 May. She had embarked 340 captives, of whom only two died, for a loss rate of 0.6%. She had a crew of 37, of whom four died. Iris arrived back at Liverpool on 30 June.

Lloyd's Register for 1795 showed that Iris was almost rebuilt in 1794. It also showed her master changing from Huson to Salisbury, and her trade from Liverpool–Africa to Liverpool–Bengal.

EIC voyage (1795-1796): Captain John B. Salisbury acquired a letter of marque on 20 August 1795. He sailed from Liverpool on 13 September 1795, bound for Bengal. Iris arrived at Calcutta on 23 February 1796. On her homeward leg she reached St Helena on 14 July, and arrived at The Downs on 4 November.

6th voyage transporting enslaved people (1797-1798): Captain John Spencer acquired a letter of marque on 29 March 1797. He sailed from Liverpool on 23 April 1797, bound for West Central Africa and St Helena (i.e., present day Angola). In 1797, 104 vessels sailed from British ports, bound on voyages to transport enslaved people; 90 sailed from Liverpool.

Iris arrived at Jamaica on 2 November, where she disembarked 405 captives. She had 35 crew members, of whom two died. Iris left Jamaica on 13 January 1798, and arrived back at Liverpool on 3 March.

7th voyage transporting enslaved people (1797-1798): Captain Spencer sailed from Liverpool on 8 June 1798, bound for the Bight of Biafra. In 1798, 160 vessels sailed from British ports, bound on voyages to transport enslaved people; 149 sailed from Liverpool. This was the largest number in the period 1795–1804.

Spencer drowned at Bonny on 20 or 30 August. His first mate, George Cannon, took over command. Iris acquired captives at Bonny and arrived at Kingston, Jamaica, on 4 November, where she disembarked 414 captives. Iris sailed from Jamaica on 12 February 1799, and arrived at Liverpool on 12 April. She had left Liverpool with a crew of 40 men; nine crew members died on the voyage.

8th voyage transporting enslaved people (1799-1800): Captain George Cannon acquired a letter of marque on 17 June 1799. He sailed from Liverpool on 5 July 1799. In 1799, 156 vessels sailed from British ports, bound on voyages to transport enslaved people; 134 sailed from Liverpool.

Iris arrived at Jamaica on 6 August 1800. She had embarked 447 captives and she disembarked 409, for a loss rate of 8.5%. She had 44 crewmen, 10 of whom died on the voyage.

== Fate ==
Iris departed Kingston. After leaving port she encountered bad weather. On 12 December, Lloyd's List reported that Iris, "Cannell", master, had put back into Kingston leaky. Iris was condemned there as unseaworthy.

In 1800, 34 British vessels in the triangular trade were lost, four of them on the homeward bound leg. Although Iris succumbed to a maritime mishap, during the period 1793 to 1807, war, rather than maritime hazards or resistance by the captives, was the greatest cause of vessel losses among British enslaving vessels.
