= Middlesex Plat Historic District =

Historic district in Iowa, United States

- U.S. National Register of Historic Places
- U.S. Historic district
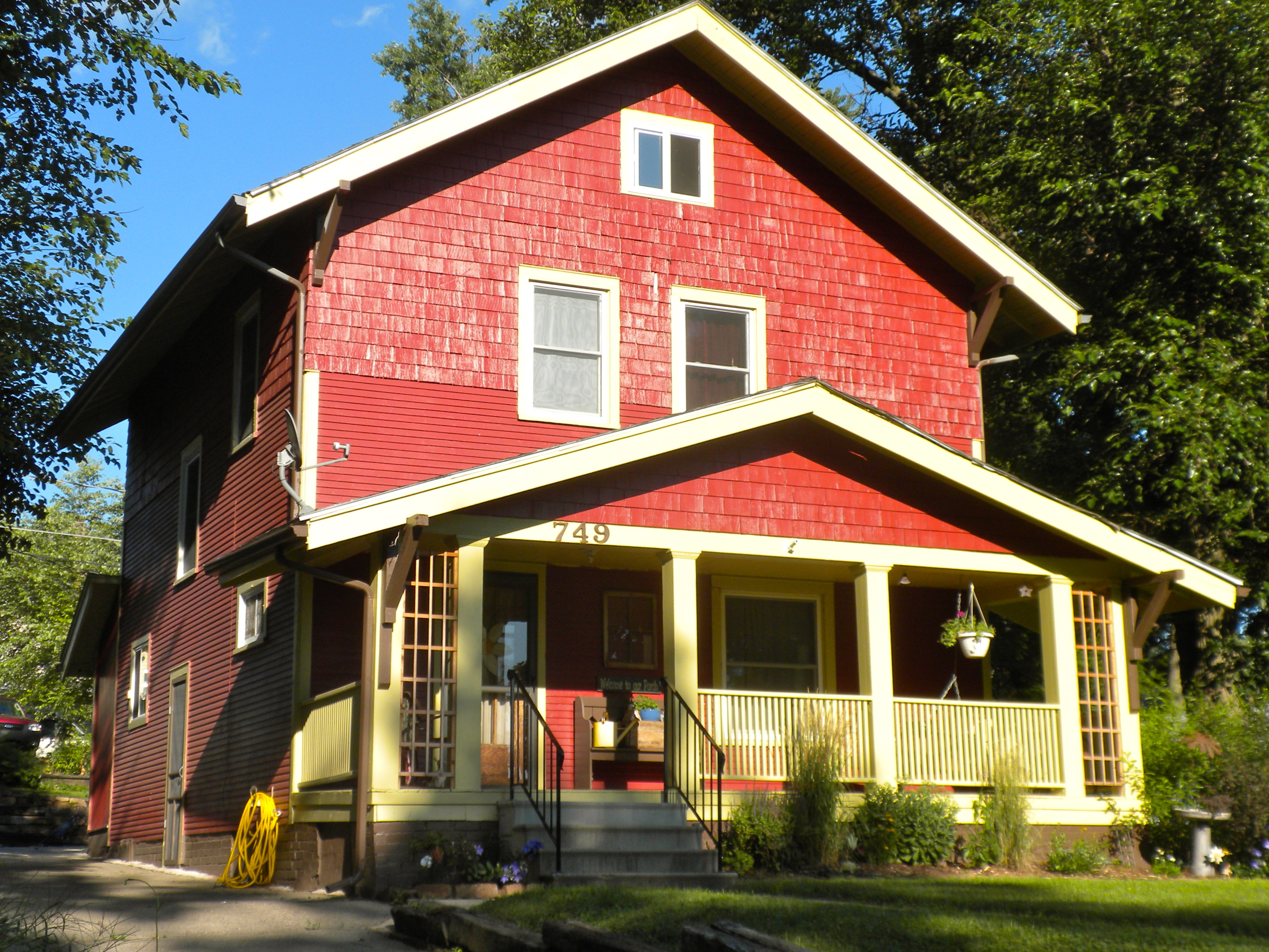

- Location within Iowa Location within the United States
- Location: Center St. to Woodland Ave., 31st to 35th Sts. Des Moines, Iowa
- Coordinates: 41°35′44″N 93°39′39″W
- Area: 37.69 acres (15.25 ha)
- Built: 1910-1923
- MPS: The Bungalow and Square House--Des Moines Residential Growth and Development MPS
- NRHP reference No.: 00000932
- Added to NRHP: November 21, 2000

The Middlesex Plat Historic District is located in Des Moines, Iowa, United States. It was an upper-middle-class neighborhood of two-story square houses and bungalows that were built from 1910 to 1923. The district has been listed on the National Register of Historic Places since 2000. It is part of The Bungalow and Square House--Des Moines Residential Growth and Development MPS.

== History ==
The Middlesex Plat is an infill area to the east of the western developments that had been built in the late 19th and early 20th century. The reason this plat had not been developed earlier was a lack of infrastructure. The Ingersoll Run sewer line was completed into northwest Des Moines in 1907. The closest streetcar line was along University Avenue, which was a distance to the north, and other the lines in the Drake and Sherman Hill neighborhoods ended to the east of this area. They were extended at the time of the sewer lines. Another factor was that the property was owned by J. Callanan who kept the property off the real estate market in the late 19th century. Most of the houses in the district were built from 1910 to 1923. Those who promoted the development of the area were able to control it in order to maintain their promises to those who bought lots and the builders. Realtor Winner and Kauffman and house builders Henry Tillia and Charles Barnes were influential in the development of the area.

== Architecture ==
The Middlesex Plat Historic District is largely composed of square houses and bungalows with a mixture of a variety of subtypes. Of the 293 properties in the district 187 are houses, of which only nine are not contributing because they were built more recently or substantially altered. There are also 106 detached garages in the district, of which 62 are contributing properties. The square houses outnumber the bungalows, and there are also 18 other houses that were built in another architectural style.

Most of the square house plans have a front gabled roofs with a full-width front porch. Six of them were built before 1906 with most of them built between 1910-1911 and then 1914–1916. Three more houses were built in this style between 1917 and 1918, with the last being built in 1923. The second largest subtype has a side-gabled roof. The peak year for construction of this type was 1910 when seven were built. Otherwise, two to three houses were started each year between 1906 and 1919. The last four houses in this subtype were built between 1919 and 1925. There were only nine American foursquare houses with a hip roof built in the district. All but two were built before 1911. The other two were built in 1916.

Most of the bungalows feature a gable front with an offset front wing with a roof that is partly a continuation of the main roof. Of the 23 in this style, three were built before 1914 and 15 were built after 1918. Seven of the bungalows have a gabled front porch with a gabled side porch. Four more bungalows have a gabled front with a parallel gable front porch. One was built in 1911 and the rest were built in 1918. There are three "areoplane bungalows" that feature a gable front single story design that has a second story room or rooms that appear to be pushed up through the roof. Three bungalows feature a front gable with recessed full-width front porch (1918, 1921, 1923). Only one bungalow has a hipped roof (1908) and there is also one example of a "plain bungalow." The remaining bungalows feature a side gable. Of these, 14 have a single roof pitch with a full-width front porch. They were built beginning in 1910 with the last being built in 1921. There are 16 more bungalows that feature a less than full-width front porch. They can be further divided into two subgroups because of their influences from either the American Craftsman or the Colonial styles. The Colonials, for the most part, were built later in the time period.

The remaining 18 houses follow the Tudor Revival, Colonial Revival or the Prairie Style. Except for the house that had a basement level garage, there are few examples of early garages. Because they post-date the period being studying they do not contribute to the historic nature of the district. There are also no alleys in the district and the narrow lots also limited garage construction. Seven of the garages are attached to the houses and 29 are basement garages.
