= Echo-class sloop =

Class overview
- Name: Echo class
- Builders: John Barton; Francis S. Willson; Edward Graves
- Built: 1782–1785
- In service: 1782–1805
- Completed: 6

The Echo-class sloop was a class of sloop-of-war designed by Edward Hunt and approved by the Royal Navy in 1781.

Six ships were built according to these specifications.

- HMS Echo
- HMS Rattler
- HMS Calypso
- HMS Nautilus
- HMS Brisk
- HMS Scorpion
