= Omba, Missouri =

Extinct hamlet in Missouri, U.S.

Coordinates: 36°52′06″N 92°09′41″W

Omba is an historic town in eastern Douglas County, Missouri, United States. The GNIS classifies it as a populated place. The townsite is located along State Route AA between Missouri Route 181 and the North Fork River.

A post office called Omba was established in 1892, and remained in operation until 1920. The name Omba was selected by the towns founder, Doc Osborn, after each of his children, Oakley, Mable, Bart, and Annis Osborn.
