= Elliott (1783 ship) =

Ship launched at Liverpool in 1783

History

Great Britain
- Name: Elliott
- Owner: 1783:F. Ingram & Co. (Note: David, Tuohy, John Clemison, Christopher Butler, Francis Ingram, Thomas Parke, Benjamin A. Heywood, and William Denison.); 1793: John Dawson and Thomas Clarke; 1796:Thomas Clarke, and John Bridge Aspinal and James Aspinall; 1799:Thomas Bailey and Michael Taylor; 1804:R. Bent; 1806:Loudensk
- Launched: 1783, Liverpool
- Fate: Captured 1807

General characteristics
- Type: Ship
- Tons burthen: 260, or 334, or 340, or 340 or 344, or 371 (bm)
- Length: 102 ft 0 in (31.1 m)
- Beam: 27 ft 0 in (8.2 m) (above the wales)
- Propulsion: Sail
- Complement: 1794:42 (Note: The crew numbers come from the declaration for the letter of marque. Information from the database on slave voyages or other sources is often quite different.); 1796:50; 1798:50; 1800:25; 1803:32; 1807:45
- Armament: 1794:22 × 6&12-pounder guns (Note: The data below on Elliott's armament come from the declarations for the letters of marque. Data from Lloyd's Register is frequently different. In particular, the 12-pounder cannons are mostly carronades, not guns. For instance, in 1804 Elliott carried two 12-pounder guns and fourteen 12-pounder carronades.); 1796:20 × 12-pounder guns; 1798:22 × 12&6-pounder guns; 1800:20 × 12-pounder guns; 1803:16 × 12-pounder guns; 1807:22 × 12&9-pounder guns
- Notes: Two decks & three masts

Elliott (or Elliot) was launched at Liverpool in 1783. She made ten voyages as a slave ship in the triangular trade, carrying enslaved people from West Africa to the West Indies. Next, she made one voyage as a whaler. She then became a merchantman, sailing between England and South America. In November 1807 French privateers captured her.

== Slave ship ==
Elliott first appears in Lloyd's Register in 1783 with "Clemensn", master, F. Ingram, owner, and trade Liverpool–Africa.

1st voyage transporting enslaved people (1783–1785): Captain John Cleminson sailed from Liverpool on 17 September 1783, bound for the Bight of Benin. He acquired captives at Whydah and arrived at Kingston, Jamaica, on 27 August 1784, with 730. Elliot left Jamaica on 1 November 1784 and arrived at Liverpool on 11 January 1785. Elliott had left Liverpool with a crew of 57 men and had suffered 22 crew deaths.

2nd voyage transporting enslaved people (1785–1786): Cleminson sailed Elliott from Liverpool on 29 June 1785 for the Bight of Benin with a crew of 66. He acquired captives primarily at Lagos/Onim, and also at Anomabu and elsewhere in the region before arriving at Kingston on 29 March 1786 with 898 captives. She left Kingston on 2 June and arrived back at Liverpool on 26 July.

3rd voyage transporting enslaved people (1786–1788): Elliott had three masters on her third slaving voyage — John Reid, William Smith, and James Mathias. (Note: Another source gives the name of her master as John Read, with James Mathews replacing Read at Jamaica on 15 April 1788.) She sailed from Liverpool on 20 September 1786, bound for the Bight of Benin. Towards the end of 1786 she was at Cape Coast Castle on her way to "Lagoe". She acquired captives at Whydah, Lagos/Onim, and elsewhere in the region, and arrived at Kingston on 18 January 1788 with 520. She landed 373. She left Kingston on 15 April, and arrived back at Liverpool on 25 June. She had started with a crew of 59 men, and had 30 crew deaths on the voyage.

Missing information (1788–1792): Elliott appears in Lloyd's Register for 1789 with Reed, master, F. Ingram, owner, and trade Liverpool–Africa. There is no record of a slave trading voyage for Elliott during this period, though apparently William Clarkson became her master on 12 May 1791. She left Lloyd's Register in 1791, returning in the issue for 1792 with Sherwood, master, Dawkins, owner, and trade again Liverpool–Africa.

4th voyage transporting enslaved people (1792–1793): Captain William Sherwood sailed from Liverpool 8 August 1792, bound for West Central Africa and St. Helena. He started purchasing slaves at the Congo River on 22 October. He also purchased slaves at Malemba (or Malembo), in the Kakongo kingdom, about 50 nautical miles north of the Congo River. Elliott left Africa 16 April 1793, and arrived at Kingston on 30 May 1793. She had embarked 475 slaves and she landed 472, for a loss rate of 0.6%. The firm offered for sale in June 1793, “470 choice young Negroes upon the ship Elliott from Melinba Coast of Angola. Cargo all inoculated for the small–pox prior to leaving the coast and only has buried five during the voyage”.

Elliot arrived back at Liverpool on 20 September. She had an initial crew of 44 men, of whom 13 died on the voyage. (Note: After the passage of Dolben's Act, masters received a bonus of £100 for a mortality rate of under 2%; the ship's surgeon received £50. For a mortality rate between two and three per cent, the bonus was halved. There was no bonus if mortality exceeded 3%. Estimated figures come from the Trans-Atlantic Slave Trade Database and are based on overall data from the database. It is perhaps striking that the unestimated data for the number of slaves embarked generally occurred for voyages with mortality rates that qualified for bonuses.)

5th voyage transporting enslaved people (1794–1795): War with France had commenced in 1793 and Sherwood acquired a letter of marque on 13 January 1794. He sailed from Liverpool on 27 February, bound for West Central Africa and St. Helena. He started purchasing slaves at Malemba on 23 June. Elliott left Africa on 28 October and arrived at Kingston on 20 December. She had embarked 505 slaves, and landed 500, for a loss rate of 1%. Elliott left Kingston on 26 February 1795, and arrived back at Liverpool on 20 April. She had an initial crew of 64 men, and suffered nine crew deaths on her voyage.

6th voyage transporting enslaved people (1795–1796): Sherwood sailed from Liverpool on 12 July 1795. In 1795, 79 vessels sailed from English ports, bound for Africa to acquire and transport enslaved people; 59 of these vessels sailed from Liverpool.

Elliot arrived at Havana in February 1796 with 497 captives. She arrived back at Liverpool on 9 May. Elliott had sailed with a crew of 49 men and had suffered two crew deaths on her voyage.

7th voyage transporting enslaved people (1796–1797): Captain David Christian acquired a letter of marque on 29 July 1796. He had previously been captain of Othello, which had burnt at Bonny Island late in 1795 or early in 1796. Christian sailed from Liverpool 12 August 1796 bound for the Bight of Biafra. In 1796, 103 vessels sailed from English ports, bound for Africa to acquire and transport enslaved people; 94 of these vessels sailed from Liverpool.

Elliot acquired captives at Bonny and arrived at Kingston on 25 February 1797. She had embarked 495 slaves and he landed 473, for a loss rate of 4.4%. She left Kingston on 4 April 1797, and arrived back at Liverpool on 26 May. Elliott had one crew member die out of an initial crew of 57 men. Christian received a bounty of £100 for low slave mortality on the voyage. Christian assumed command of Parr and died in 1798 when she caught fire after leaving Bonny in 1798.

8th voyage transporting enslaved people (1798–1799): Captain John Parkinson acquired a letter of marque on 21 March 1798. He sailed from Liverpool on 2 May, bound for West Central Africa and St. Helena. In 1798, 160 vessels sailed from English ports, bound for Africa to acquire and transport enslaved people; 149 of these vessels sailed from Liverpool. This was the highest number in the period 1795–1804.

Elliot delivered 503 captives at Martinique on 2 January 1799. She left Martinique 24 January, and arrived back at Liverpool on 21 March. Elliott had an initial crew of 62 men, and lost seven.

9th voyage transporting enslaved people (1800–1802): Captain Timothy Boardman acquired a letter of marque on 7 June 1800. He sailed on 8 August 1800.

It is not clear where Elliot acquired captives, or exactly where in the British Caribbean she delivered them. She left her delivery port on 2 February 1802 and arrived at Liverpool on 21 April. Elliot had an initial crew of 50 men, and had 18 crew deaths.

10th voyage transporting enslaved people (1802–1804): Elliott had two masters on this voyage, A. Lawson and John Livingston. She sailed from Liverpool on 20 July 1802, bound for the Bight of Biafra. (Because she sailed during the Peace of Amiens, her captain did not acquire a letter of marque.) In 1802, 155 vessels sailed from English ports, bound for Africa to acquire and transport enslaved people; 122 of these vessels sailed from Liverpool.

Elliot purchased captives at Bonny and arrived at Havana in March 1803. She arrived back at Liverpool on 12 July.

== Whaler ==
Year	Master	Owner	Trade	Source & notes
1804	Shuttleworth	R.Bent	London–South Seas	LR; almost rebuilt 1800, & new deck and thorough repair 1803

Captain John Shuttleworth acquired a letter of marque on 29 September 1803. Shortly thereafter he sailed Elliot for Timor. Between 10 and 15 August 1804 she was among a number of whalers from London that were well at Timor, including Perseverance, Iris, Eliza, and others. Between 12 and 29 January 1806 she was at St Helena, having come from the South Seas. She returned to England on 22 March 1806. She was mentioned in the Protection Lists in 1803 and 1806.

== Merchantman and capture ==
Captain Charles London acquired a letter of marque on 7 May 1807. Lloyd's Register for 1807 shows Elliot with London, master, Loudensk, owner, and trade London–Buenos Aires.

On 5 November 1807 three French privateers captured Elliot and Juno at 19°4′N 61°30′W (about 120 miles NNE of Anguilla) as they were sailing from Demerara, Elliot back to London and Juno to Liverpool. Elliott, of 16 guns and 18 men, and Juno, 10 guns and 27 men, resisted for an hour and a half before they struck. Elliot had one man killed, and two wounded, one of whom, the mate, later died of his wounds. The three French privateers were Jalouse, of seven guns and 80 men, Fripon, of five guns and 80 men, and Becune, of three guns and 45 men. The privateers took their prizes into Guadeloupe. (Note: Fripon was probably Friponne, a 5-gun schooner commissioned in November 1806 in Guadeloupe. Bécune was a privateer commissioned in February 1807 at Saint-Pierre de la Martinique under Jérôme Boubée. Her first cruise occurred in February–March; a second occurred in July–August. She was recommissioned at Saint-Martin in early 1808. Her next cruise ended when HMS Ferret captured her.)

The Essequebo and Demerary Royal Gazette reported on 31 December 1807 that a cartel had arrived from Guadaloupe with some passengers who had been captured on Elliot, Capt. London, and Juno, Capt. M'Murray. It noted that the two ships had sailed in company from Demerara about 15 October.

Lloyd's Register for 1809 has the notation "captured" under Elliott's name.
