= Eliza (1800 ship) =

History

Spain
- Launched: 1794
- Captured: c.1800

Great Britain
- Name: Eliza
- Owner: 1800:Richardson; 1802:Holman; 1803:Darknell; 1807:Whytock & Co.
- Acquired: 1800 by purchase of a prize
- Fate: Sold 1810
- Notes: This Eliza is often confused with two other whalers that operated at the same time: Eliza (1789 ship) and Eliza (1802 ship)

Portugal
- Name: Courier de Londres
- Owner: De Silva/Portuguese interests
- Acquired: 1810 by purchase
- Fate: Last listed 1814

General characteristics
- Tons burthen: 268 bm
- Complement: 22
- Armament: 1800:16 × 9&6-pounder guns; 1812:2 × 6-pounder guns + 16 × 9-pounder carronades

Eliza was built in Spain in 1794 under another name and taken as a prize circa 1800. She then made one voyage for the British East India Company (EIC). On her return she made one voyage to Timor as a whaler. She next became a West Indiaman. In 1810 she apparently was sold to Portuguese interests and who continued to sail her under the name Courier de Londres. She is last listed in 1814.

== Career ==
Eliza entered Lloyd's Register in 1800 with Holeman, master, Richardson, owner, and trade London–"Hope" (Cape of Good Hope). The entry describes her as being Spanish, and six years old. (Note: A book covering ships employed in the South Sea Whale Fishery from Britain mis-attributes two voyages to Eliza, one between 1798 and 1800, and one from 1800 to 1802. There is no evidence in Lloyd's Register for the first, and strong evidence that Eliza was otherwise employed at the time of second.)

Captain Francis Holman acquired a letter of marque on 27 September 1800. Messrs. Princip and Saunders then tendered her to the EIC to bring back rice from Bengal. She was one of 28 vessels that sailed between December 1800 and February 1801.

Holman sailed Eliza from Calcutta on 11 December 1801. On 21 January 1802 she was at Saugor. She reached St Helena on 11 April and arrived at The Downs on 11 June.

The Register of Shipping for 1802 shows Holman as both Eliza's master an owner, and her trade changing from London–Cape of Good Hope, to London–Demerara. (Lloyd's Register shows her trade as Liverpool–Demerara.)

Lloyd's Register for 1803 shows her master changing from Holman to J. Richards, her owner changing from Capt. & Co. to Darknell, and her trade from Liverpool–Demerara to London–Southern Fisheries. (Note: A comprehensive database of whaling voyages to the Southern fisheries mis-attributes Daniel Bennett as Eliza's owner. It also mis-attributes other whaling voyages to Eliza under Bennett or others' ownership. It essentially scrambles two vessels, Eliza (1802 ship), French prize of 264 tons (bm), and the current Eliza.)

Captain Joseph Richards sailed from England on 5 December 1803, bound for Timor. On 7 July 1804 Eliza was at Timor. Between 10 and 15 August 1804 she was among a number of whalers from London that were well at Timor, including Perseverance, Elliott, Iris, and others. On 29 January 1806 Eliza was at St Helena. She returned to England on 22 April 1806.

Lloyd's Register for 1807 still shows Eliza with Richards, master, Darknell, owner, and trade London–Southern fisheries. However, in 1807 Eliza underwent a large repair, and re-coppering. She emerged with N. Brown, master, Whytock, owner, and trade London–Montevideo.

On 10 January 1808 Eliza, Brown, master, sailed from Port-au-Prince, bound for England. She sailed in company with Diana and Henry, of Liverpool. On 11 January three privateers attacked them, but they were able to repel them. The next day six privateers attacked them four times before the privateers gave up. On the 13th a gale forced Henry, which was in a leaky state, to part and sail to Jamaica. Diana and Eliza parted on 28 February near Cape Clear. Diana arrived safely at Liverpool. Eliza arrived safely at Portsmouth.

Lloyd's Register and the Shipping Register for 1809 still show Brown as master and Whytock as owner. However, the show her trade as London–Montevideo and London–Demerara, respectively. Eliza disappears from subsequent issues of the registers.

The Register of Shipping for 1810, however, shows the entry of Courier de Londres, Spanish prize of 268 tons (bm), which underwent large repairs in 1807. Her master is De Silva, her owners are Portuguese interests, and her trade is London– the Brazils. Commerce de Londres appears in the 1811 issue of Lloyd's Register with M. De Silva, master, Capt. & Co. owner, and trade London–Pernambuco. She had undergone a thorough repair in 1807, her burthen is 270 tons, and her origin is Spain with a launch year of 1794. She is no longer listed in Lloyd's Register for 1812, but continues to appear as Courier de Londres in the Register of Shipping.

== Fate ==
Courier de Londres is last listed in 1814.
