= Omba Island =

Island in West Papua Province, Indonesia

Omba Island is an island of Indonesia. It was written about by William Dampier in A Continuation of a Voyage to New Holland (1699):

That afternoon we saw the opening between the islands Omba and Fetter, but feared to pass through in the night. At two o'clock in the morning it fell calm; and continued so till noon, in which time we drove with the current back again south-west six or seven leagues. On the 22nd, steering to the eastward to get through between Omba and Fetter, we met a very strong tide against us, so that we, although we had a very fresh gale, yet made way very slowly; yet before night got through. By a good observation we found that the south-east point of Omba lies in latitude 8 degrees 25 minutes. In my charts it is laid down in 8 degrees 10 minutes. My true course from Babao is east 25 degrees north, distance one hundred and eighty-three miles. We sounded several times when near Omba, but had no ground. On the north-east point of Omba we saw four or five men, and a little further three pretty houses on a low point, but did not go ashore.

In February 1805, the British ship Iris, under the command of Captain William Clark, intercepted and engaged a valuable Batavian vessel near Omba Island; after a fierce battle, Clarke was badly wounded and the Iris was too damaged to continue, and had to break off the engagement.
