= Duchess of Portland (1783 ship) =

History

Great Britain
- Name: Duchess of Portland
- Namesake: Duchess of Portland
- Launched: 1783, Bristol
- Captured: 4 July 1812

General characteristics
- Tons burthen: 273, or 296, or 300 (bm)
- Propulsion: Sail
- Complement: 1801:24; 1812:11
- Armament: 1801:8 × 6&18-pounder cannons; 1801:2 × 18-pounder carronades + 6 × 6-pounder guns "of the New Construction"; 1806:6 × 18-pounder guns; 1812:6 cannons

Duchess of Portland (or Dutchess of Portland) was launched at Bristol in 1783. She was primarily a West Indiaman. However, she made one voyage as a slave ship in the triangular trade in enslaved people, and two as a whaler in the British southern whale fishery. She then became a transport. The US Navy captured her in 1812. She was in ballast and her captors burnt her.

== Career ==
Lloyd's Register (LR), and later, the Register of Shipping, both show Duchess of Portland being built in 1783. Even so, Dutchess of Portland did not appear in LR until 1787. That issue showed her with B. Francis, master, Dickinson, owner, and trade London–Dominica.

The ship arrivals and departures (SAD) data in Lloyd's List (LL) showed her with Francis, master, making a voyage to Dominica, via New York, in 1787. Furthermore, in 1789 LL reported on 6 February 1789 that Duchess of Portland, Francis, master, had put into Dartmouth in great distress. She had been sailing from London to Dominica when she suffered the loss of her masts and other damage. She had damages repaired in 1789.

LR for 1792 showed Duchess of Portland with E. Lamb, master, Hamilton, owner, and trade London–Jamaica, changing to London–Africa.

Enslaving voyage (1792–1793): Captain Edward Lamb sailed from London on 5 December 1792. He started purchasing captives on 1 March 1793 at Cape Coast Castle. Although under the Slave Trade Act 1788 (28 Geo. 3. c. 54), Duchess of Portland was legally authorized to carry up to some 400 captives, he purchased only 99. Duchess of Portland arrived at Lucea on 24 June and landed 98 captives. At some point Captain Taylor replaced Lamb. Duchess of Portland arrived back at London on 3 November.

After the passage of the Slave Trade Act 1788, masters received a bonus of £100 for a mortality rate of under 2%; the ship's surgeon received £50. For a mortality rate between two and three per cent, the bonus was halved. There was no bonus if mortality exceeded 3%. (Note: At the time the monthly wage for a captain of a slave ship out of Bristol was £5 per month.)

LR for 1794 showed her master changing from E. Lamb to Pollock and her trade from London–Africa to London-"Grdlp". She had undergone a thorough repair in 1794. The next year it showed her owner as Park. The 1798 volume showed her master changing from Pollock to J.Smith, her owner from Park to Mangles, and her trade from London–West Indies to London–Jamaica.

LR for 1801 showed Duchess of Portland with W.Warlow, master, changing to Cleveland, Mangles, owner, and trade London–Jamaica, changing to London–Southern Fishery. She had undergone a large repair in 1800, and lengthening. She was valued at £7000 in 1802, and the British East India Company authorized her to sail east of the Cape of Good Hope. Captain Reuben Cleveland acquired a letter of marque on 10 February 1801.

1st whaling voyage (1801–1802): Duchess of Portland sailed on 10 March 1801. On 19 May she put into Gibraltar for repairs to damage suffered when she repelled attacks by two privateers. Duchess of Portland, Cleveland, master, was reported "all well" on 9 December off the coast of Brazil. She returned to London on 5 September 1802.

2nd whaling voyage (1802–1805): Captain Cleveland sailed from London on 17 September 1802. During her voyage she was reported off the coast of Brazil in company with Ferret and Perseverance, and then in the Pacific. She was engaged in sealing at Desolation Island shortly before arriving at Saint Helena. She returned to London on 21 March 1805.

LR for 1805 showed Duchess of Portland's master changing from Cleveland to Thompson. The Register of Shipping (RS) for 1806 showed Dutchess of Portland with Thompson as master, T&R Brown as owners, and her trade as London transport. She also had had damages repaired in 1805.

On 21 August 1805 Duchess of Portland sailed for Malta.

Year	Master	Owner	Trade	Source & notes
1806	Thompson	Bown & Co.	Cowes transport	LR; new deck and large repair 1800, damages repaired 1802, thorough repair 1804

== Fate ==
Lloyd's List (LL) reported on 30 October 1812 that Commodore Rodger's squadron had captured and burnt Duchess of Portland, Thompson, master, as she was sailing from Newcastle. Duchess of Portland had been sailing from New Castle for Pictou. The actual captor was USS President and the capture took place on 4 July.

The Register of Shipping for 1813 showed Duchess of Portland with Thompson, master and owner, and trade Southampton–London. The entry carried the annotation "CAPTURED" by her name.
