= Argo (1806 Liverpool ship) =

British slave ship

History

United Kingdom
- Name: Argo
- Builder: France
- Launched: 1783
- Acquired: 1806 by purchase of a prize
- Fate: Lost 1806

General characteristics
- Tons burthen: 332 (bm)
- Complement: 38
- Armament: 16 × 6-pounder guns

Argo was built in France in 1783, possibly under another name. She was taken in prize circa 1806 and sailed as a slave ship in the triangular trade in enslaved people. She first appeared in the Register of Shipping in 1806.

| Year | Master | Owner | Trade | Source |
|---|---|---|---|---|
| 1806 | Thomson | McDowell | Liverpool–Africa | RS; damages repaired 1806 |

Captain William Thompson sailed Argo from Liverpool on 10 April 1806, bound for Bonny.

In September 1806 Lloyd's List reported that Argo, of Liverpool, Thompson, master, had been lost on the coast of Africa. She had been lost on the Windward Coast; her crew was saved.

In 1806, 33 British ships in the triangular trade were lost. Twenty-three of these were lost on the coast of Africa. During the period 1793 to 1807, war, rather than maritime hazards or resistance by the captives, was the greatest cause of vessel losses among British slave vessels.
