= Lion (1796 ship) =

History

Dutch Republic
- Name: Leuve? or Leuuw
- Builder: Holland
- Launched: 1789
- Captured: c.1795

Great Britain
- Name: Lion
- Owner: 1796: Camden (Camden, Calvert and King); 1797: Calvert & Co.
- Acquired: 1796 by purchase of a prize
- Fate: Condemned 1798

General characteristics
- Tons burthen: 762 (bm)
- Propulsion: Sail
- Armament: 16 × 9-pounder guns

Lion was launched in the Netherlands in 1789. She was taken in prize c. 1795. On her first voyage under British ownership she was under contract to the British East India Company (EIC). She was lost in 1798 on the homeward-bound leg of her voyage to India.

== Career ==
One source states that Lion was built as Leuve for the Dutch East India Company (VOC) and captured at Saldanha Bay in 1795. However, the most comprehensive database of VOC voyages has no record of a Leuve, or even of a Leuuw (the Dutch word for lion) fitting the dates and circumstances. The list of Dutch merchant vessels captured at Simon's Bay in connection with the British capture of Saldanha Bay also does not list a suitable vessel.

Lion entered Lloyd's Register in 1796 with Thompson, master, Camden, owner, and trade London–East Indies. The 1797 volume of Lloyd's Register shows her owner as Calvert & Co.

Lion sailed on 3 April 1796 to India for the EIC. It is not clear who her captain was. Lloyd's Register showed it as Thompson, but an account of her loss gave it as Sever.

Lion was at Delagoa Bay in late June 1798, having put in in distress as she was returning to England from Madras and Colombo.

There, on 28 June 1798, Captain Sever chartered three whalers, Eliza, Kerr, master, and two other English ships, London, Keen, master, and Neptune, Hopper, master, to carry Lion's cargo back to England. Lion had been carrying a cargo from Madras and Colombo to England when she had put into Delagoa Bay in distress. Despite the efforts of the three other English ships and three American ships there, Lion could not be saved. Most of her officers and crew abandoned her on 18 July.

Lloyd's List simply reported on 21 December that Lion had been condemned at Delagoa Bay and that three whalers had been hired to bring back her cargo.

The EIC put the value of its cargo aboard her at £8,272.
