= HMS Nautilus (1784) =

Echo-class ship-sloop of the Royal Navy

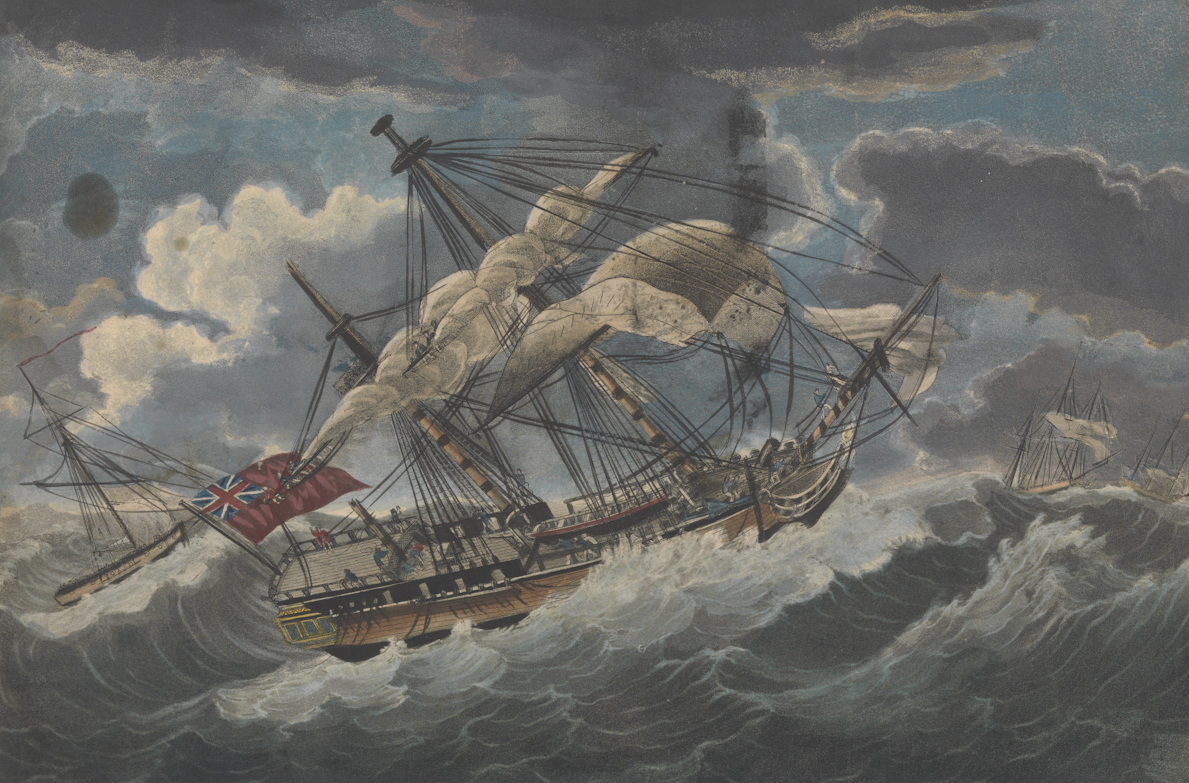
- HMS Calypso, Nautilus's sister ship, sinking in 1803

History

United Kingdom
- Name: Nautilus
- Ordered: 13 May 1782
- Builder: Crookenden, Taylor & Smith, Itchenor
- Laid down: August 1872
- Launched: 9 January 1784
- Commissioned: November 1784
- Fate: wrecked 2 February 1799

General characteristics
- Class & type: Echo-class sloop
- Tons burthen: 345 (bm)
- Length: Overall: 100 ft 9 in (30.7 m); Keel: 84 ft 3 in (25.7 m)
- Beam: 27 ft 7 in (8.4 m)
- Draught: 9 ft 3 in (2.8 m)
- Complement: 125
- Armament: Upper deck: 6 × 6-pounder guns; QD: 4 × 12-pounder carronades; Fc: 2 × 12-pounder carronades

HMS Nautilus was a 16-gun Echo-class ship-sloop of the Royal Navy. She was launched at Itchenor in 1784, and then moved to Portsmouth to be completed in December 1784.

== Commanders ==
The following officers of the Royal Navy commanded the ship.

- 1.11.1784 - 27.3.1786 George Tripp
- 27.3.1786 - 2.12.1788 Thomas Boulden Thompson
- 16.1.1789 - 1.10.1790 John Trigge
- 1.10.1790 - 24.4.1793 Charles Craven
- 17.12.1792 - 6.2.1793 Sir Harry Burrard Neale
- 20.2.1793 - 8.1.1794 Henry Powlett
- 9.1.1794 - 24.3.1794 James Carpenter
- 1795 - 9.1795 James Ross
- 9.1795 - 3.2.1799 Henry Gunter
