= HMS Calypso (1783) =

Echo-class ship-sloop of the Royal Navy (1783–1803)

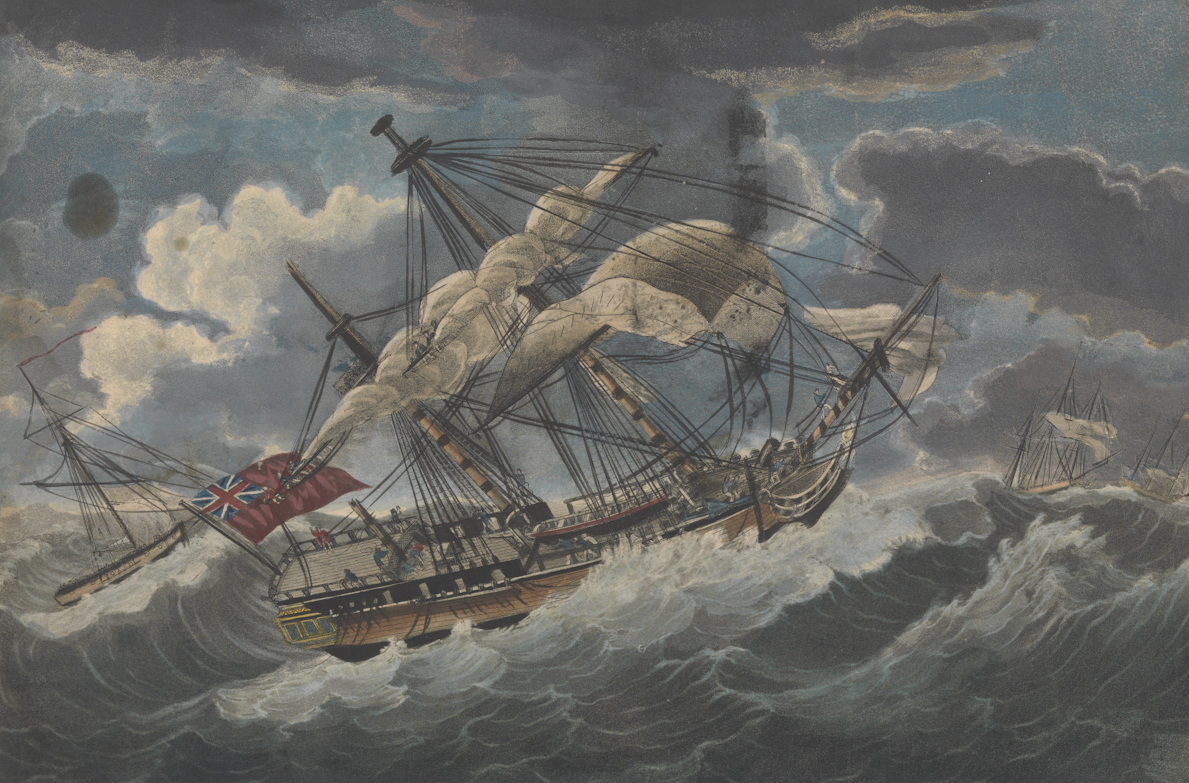
- Calypso sinking in 1803

History

United Kingdom
- Name: Calypso
- Ordered: 28 December 1781
- Builder: Edward Graves, Deptford, London
- Laid down: May 1782
- Launched: 27 September 1783
- Commissioned: 1 December 1783
- Fate: Sunk in collision 30 July 1803

General characteristics
- Class & type: Echo-class sloop-of-war
- Tons burthen: 3422/94 (bm)
- Length: 101 ft 6 in (30.9 m)(gundeck); 83 ft 7 in (25.5 m)(keel)
- Beam: 27 ft 9 in (8.5 m)
- Draught: 6 ft 9 in (2.1 m) (unladen); 9 ft 9 in (3.0 m) (laden)
- Depth of hold: 12 ft 10 2/3 in (3.9 m)
- Sail plan: Brig-rigged
- Complement: Originally:125; 1794 on:121
- Armament: Upper Deck: 16 × 6-pounder guns; QD: 4 × 12-pounder carronades; Fc: 2 × 12-pounder carronades

HMS Calypso was a 16-gun Echo-class ship-sloop of the Royal Navy. She was built at Deptford between 1781 and 1783, launched on 27 September 1783 and first commissioned on 1 December 1783 for service off Northern Ireland and Scotland. She served in the North Sea, Atlantic, and the West Indies. Calypso sank whilst acting as a convoy escort on 30 July 1803 after colliding with a West Indiaman merchant ship during a violent storm.

== Construction ==
Calypso was built to the same technical drawings as the five other Echo-class ships: Echo, Rattler, Brisk, Nautilus, and Scorpion. The class was designed to be 16-gun ship sloops with quarterdecks and forecastles.

All use the same plans for frame, inboard profile, lines, stern, and upper and lower decks

== Service history ==
Calypso was first commissioned in September 1783 under Commander Ralph Dundas for service on the Irish and Scottish stations. She was then refitted at Plymouth and placed in ordinary in October 1785. She was paid off in October 1786.

Her second commission began in January 1787 under Commander William Mitchell. After fitting for Channel service she sailed for Jamaica on 16 April 1787, returning to home waters in 1790 and once more being placed in ordinary.

Calypso underwent a period of repair and was refitted at Portsmouth between July 1793 and March 1796. Her third commission began in January 1796 under Commander Andrew Smith, who took her to sea following her repair and refit to join Admiral Duncan's North Sea Fleet.

In January 1797 Commander Richard Worsley took command and operated Calypso as a convoy escort and cruiser. Commander C. Collis succeeded Worsley in November 1797. Collis continued operating in this role until April 1798 when Calypso returned to Portsmouth for refit.

Commander Henry Garrett took command in April 1799 and was succeeded by Commander Joseph Baker in November of that year. Baker took Calypso to the Caribbean, sailing for the Leeward Islands in February 1800. Whilst under Baker's command on this station, Calypso participated in several actions.

- 13 April 1800 - Her cutter took the schooner Diligente (6-guns) (Note: Head money for 57 men was paid in October 1829. A first-class share was worth £31 6s 4½d; a fifth-class share, that of a seaman, was worth 4s ½d.)
- 21 July 1800 captured unknown French sloop.
- 15 November 1800 - Fought off a French squadron, saving a convoy and capturing 16-gun sloop Ganso (with HMS Crescent)

In October 1801 Commander Robert Barrie assumed command, followed by Commander Edward Brenton in April 1802, and finally by Commander William Venour in August 1802.

== Fate ==
On 30 July 1803, Calypso and the 74-gun Goliath were escorting a convoy of heavily laden West Indiamen from Jamaica. The convoy was caught in a violent storm that dismasted 21 of the vessels. One of the merchantmen ran down Calypso, sinking her with the loss of all hands.
