= Eliza (1783 ship) =

History

United States
- Launched: 1780
- Fate: Captured 1782

Great Britain
- Name: Eliza
- Owner: 1783:Hodgson & Co. (Note: John and Thomas Hodgson (jr), Isaac and Richard Capstick, and William Neilson.); 1790:Gregson & Co. (Note: William, John, James, and William Gregson (Jr), John and James Aspinall, Edward Wilson, and George Case.); 1792:Case & Co. (Note: The owners for the four voyages were some combination of John Gregson, George Case, John B. Aspinall, James Gregson, James Aspinall, and William Gregson, Jr.)
- Builder: American-built
- Launched: 1780
- Fate: Exploded and sank 1797

General characteristics
- Tons burthen: 170, or 182, or 216, or 231, (bm)
- Length: 83 ft 3 in (25.4 m)
- Beam: 25 ft 0 in (7.6 m)
- Complement: 1794:15; 1795:15; 1797:25
- Armament: 1794:8 × 8x3&4&6-pounder guns; 1795:12 × 6&9-pounder guns; 1797:14 × 6&9-pounder guns
- Notes: Two decks & three masts

Eliza was launched in America in 1780 and taken in prize in 1782. She entered the Liverpool registry in 1783, 1786, and again in 1792. She made nine voyages as a Liverpool-based slave ship in the triangular trade in enslaved people. She was lost in an explosion on her tenth voyage after she had already embarked her captives. All the captives died, as did her captain and most of her crew. The explosion occurred during a single ship action on 17 December 1797, with a French privateer.

== Career ==
Eliza was a prize taken from the Americans in 1782 and condemned at the Vice admiralty court at Antigua on 29 July.

Eliza appears in Lloyd's Register in 1783 having undergone a thorough repair. Her master was J. Cleator, changing to J. Forsyth, and her owner T.Hodgins. Her trade was Tortola–Liverpool, changing to Liverpool–Africa.

Enslaving voyage #1 (1783–1784): Captain John Forsyth sailed from Liverpool on 15 June 1783. She was reported to have been on the Windward Coast of Africa on 1 January 1784, together with a number of other enslaving ships. Eliza delivered the captives that she had gathered to Dominica, which she reached on 14 July 1784. She had gathered her captives first around Nunez River and Assinie-Mafia, and then at the Sierra Leone estuary at Bunce Island. She landed 300. Or, she had embarked 336 captives and landed 300, for a mortality rate of 11%.) She left Dominica on 11 August, and arrived at Liverpool on 20 September. She had started with a crew of 38 and had seven crew deaths on the voyage.

Eliza underwent more repairs in 1784.

Enslaving voyage #2 (1785): Captain Thomas Sutton sailed from Liverpool on 2 February 1784. He acquired captives at New Calabar, and Eliza arrived at Dominica 19 July with 380. (Or, she had embarked 466 captives and landed 380, for a mortality rate of 18%.) She left Dominica on 12 August, and arrived back at Liverpool 12 October. She had left with 37 crew men, and had 22 when she first started to acquire captives. She had 14 crew deaths on the voyage.

Enslaving voyage #3 (1785–1786): Captain Sutton sailed from Liverpool on 31 December 1785. Eliza acquired captives at New Calabar and arrived at Dominica on 30 June 1786. Captain Sutton had died on 8 May; Captain William Garnet replaced Sutton. She arrived with 390 captives. (Or, she had embarked 480 captives and landed 388, for a mortality rate of 19%.) Eliza had left with 40 crew men and still had 37 when she arrived at Dominica. She returned to Liverpool on 3 December 1786.

Enslaving voyage #4 (1787–1788): Captain Garnet sailed from Liverpool on 6 May 1787. Eliza arrived at Grenada on 17 November, having gathered her captives at Îles de Los. She arrived with 405 captives and landed 403. At some point Captain Thomas Huson replaced Garnet. Eliza left Grenada on 15 December, and arrived back at Liverpool on 25 January 1788. She had started with 32 crew members and had three crew deaths on the voyage.

Enslaving voyage #5 (1788–1789): Captain Huson sailed from Liverpool on 24 March 1788. Eliza left Africa on 12 October, and arrived at Dominica on 14 November with 315 captives. She arrived back at Liverpool on 24 February 1789.

The Slave Trade Act 1788 (Dolben's Act) was the first British legislation passed to regulate the shipping of enslaved people. The Act limited the number of enslaved people that British slave ships could transport, based on the ships' tons burthen. At a burthen of 216 tons, the cap would have been 355 captives; at a burthen of 231 tons, the cap would have been 370 captives.

Another of the provisions of Dolben's Act was bonuses for the master (£100) and surgeon (£50) if the mortality among the captives was under 2%; a mortality rate of under 3% resulted in a bonus of half that. Dolben's Act apparently resulted in some reduction in the numbers of captives carried per vessel, and possibly in mortality, though the evidence is ambiguous.

Eliza appeared in Lloyd's Register in 1790 with T. Huson, master, changing to T. Ashburner, Hodgson & Co., owner, and trade Greenock–Cork, changing to Liverpool–Africa.

Enslaving voyage #6 (1790–1792): Captain Thomas Ashburner sailed from Liverpool on 21 March 1790 for the Cameroons. Eliza acquired captives at the Cameroons, and then visited São Tomé. She arrived at Grenada on 6 November 1791, with 252 captives. She returned to Liverpool on 1 February 1792. She had left Liverpool with 24 crewmen and suffered only one crew death on the voyage.

Eliza was re-registered in Liverpool in 1792.

Enslaving voyage #7 (1792–1793): Captain Archibald Thomson sailed from Liverpool on 20 August 1792, and arrived at Grenada in March 1793. She left Grenada on 8 April, and arrived at Liverpool on 9 May. She had started with 29 crew members and suffered 13 crew deaths on the voyage.

Eliza re-entered Lloyd's Register in 1794 with Toben, master, Case & Co., owners, and trade Liverpool–Africa.

Enslaving voyage #8 (1794–1795): Captain John Tobin acquired a letter of marque on 24 May 1794. He sailed from Liverpool on 22 June for Africa, and arrived at Kingston, Jamaica, on 11 January 1795. Eliza had embarked captives at Loango and arrived with 366. At some point Captain Philip Kewish replaced Tobin. Eliza left Kingston on 22 February and arrived back at Liverpool on 17 April. She had left with 23 crewmen and suffered one crew death on the voyage. (Note: Captain Kewish became captain of Liver, an enslaving ship that George Case owned. Kewish would die aboard Liver in 1797 while on his second enslaving voyage aboard her. A French privateer would capture her.)

Enslaving #9 (1795–1796): Captain Hamlet Mullion acquired a letter of marque on 31 August 1795. (Note: He had been master on Liver.) He sailed from Liverpool on 26 September 1795 for the Gold Coast. He acquired captives at Dixcove, Anomabu, and Accra. Eliza arrived at Demerara on 28 March 1796. She left Demerara on 11 June and returned to Liverpool on 26 July. She had started with a crew of 34 men and suffered six crew deaths on the voyage.

== Loss ==
Enslaving voyage #10 (1797–Loss): Captain James Bird acquired a letter of marque on 5 July 1797. He left Liverpool on 19 July 1797. He embarked captives and set out for the West Indies. In December, Eliza encountered a French privateer and an engagement developed. The privateer struck, but then suddenly Eliza exploded. All the captives on board died, as did 30 of her crew of 37. Captain Bird was among the dead. The privateer rescued seven crew members. Earlier, Eliza had recaptured a large Portuguese brig carrying a cargo of tobacco and rum.

Lloyd's List reported on 11 May 1798 that the action and explosion had taken place near Barbados. The action had taken place on 19 December 1797.

In 1797, 40 British slave ships were lost. It was the second worst year for such losses after the 50 losses in 1795. In 1797, 104 British vessels had sailed from Britain on enslaving voyages. This implies a loss rate of 38%. Of the losses in 1797, 13 occurred in the Middle Passage, as the ships were on their way from Africa to the West Indies.
