= Rachel (1783 ship) =

History

Great Britain
- Name: Rachel
- Owner: 1783:John Coulson, William Holt and Jonathan Lacy; 1800:Walter Carr
- Builder: Whitby
- Launched: 1783
- Fate: Abandoned October 1817

General characteristics
- Tons burthen: 300, or 303, or 314, or 315, or 350 (bm)
- Length: 100 ft (30 m)
- Beam: 27 ft (8.2 m)
- Sail plan: Brig
- Armament: 3 × 4-pounder guns

Rachel (or Rachael) was launched at Whitby in 1783. She primarily traded with the Baltic, but made some voyages as a West Indiaman. A gale caused her crew to abandon her near Memel in October 1817.

== Career ==
Rachel first appeared in Lloyd's Register (LR) in 1783 with F.White, master, J.Coulson, owner, and trade Whitby–Norway.

Year	Master	Owner	Trade	Source & notes
1786	J.Coulson	Captain & Co.	London–Petersburg	LR
1790	W.Welch	Coulson & Co.	Liverpool–Ostend	LR
1795	W.Welch	Coulson & Co.	Liverpool–Baltic	LR
1800	W.Carr	Captain	London–Hamburg	LR; good repair 1798
1805	W.Carr	Captain	London–Hamburg	LR; good repair 1798
1810	W.Carr	Carr & Co.	London–Montserrat	LR; good repair 1798 & thorough repair 1805
1815	J.Price	Carr & Co.	London–St Kitts	LR; good repairs 1811 & 1813, damages repaired 1815
1816	J.Price	W. Carr	London–Petersburg	Register of Shipping (RS); good repair 1813 and damages repaired 1815

On 20 May 1815 as Rachel, Price, master, was returning to Whitby from Memel she got on shore. She was gotten off with little damage.

== Fate ==
Lloyd's List reported that a gale near Memel on 2 October 1817 had resulted in the loss of Rachel, of Whitby, and some other vessels. The crews had been saved. Reportedly, she drifted ashore on the coast of Ireland, derelict.
