= Eliza (1804 ship) =

History

United Kingdom
- Name: Alert
- Builder: Calcutta
- Launched: 1802 (as Alert), 1804 (Note: There is much ambiguity, with some sources giving the year as 1806, e.g., Bateson. Lloyd's Register for 1835 and 1836 gives it as 1807.)
- Renamed: Eliza
- Fate: Abandoned at sea 1836

General characteristics
- Tons burthen: 500 511, or 512, or 51237/94, or 515, or 538 (1835) (bm)
- Propulsion: Sail

Eliza was a merchant ship built in British India, probably in 1804. (She may have been built in 1802 as Alert.) Between 1819 and 1831 she made five voyages transporting convicts from England and Ireland to Australia. In between, she also made one voyage for the British East India Company (EIC). Her crew abandoned her at sea in 1836 as she was leaking uncontrollably.

== Career ==
Eliza first appears in British registries in 1812 in a relatively illegible entry in the supplementary pages to Lloyd's Register. The table below shows the somewhat inconsistent entries from both Lloyd's Register and the Register of Shipping for 1813.

Master	Owner	Trade	Notes	Source
N. Jordan	Bouderet	London	Calcutta-built 1804	Lloyd's
J. Allen	G. Faith	London—St Croix	India-built 1804	Register

The 1814 issue of Lloyd's Register shows the same master and owner as the 1813 issue of the Shipping Register, but now the launch year in 1806, and the trade is simply "London transport".

=== First convict transport voyage (1819-1820) ===
Under the command of Francis Hunt and surgeon J. Brydone, she left England on 16 October 1819, arrived in Sydney on 21 January 1820. She embarked 160 male convicts and had one death en route.

Eliza departed Port Jackson on 21 March 1820 bound for Hobart Town.

=== Second convict transport voyage (1822) ===
On her second convict voyage under the command of J. Hunt and surgeon William Rae, she left Sheerness, England on 20 July 1822, and arrived in Sydney on 22 November 1822. She embarked 160 male convicts and had no convict deaths en route. However, the surgeons log states that "28 October 1822: Last night about 8pm the deck being wet and slippery from rain, Mr R Bowen, the second mate of the ship with the prison keys, slipped and fell overboard [and lost at sea]"

Eliza departed Port Jackson on 12 January 1823, bound for Batavia.

=== EIC voyage (1825-26) ===
Captain William Faith sailed from the Downs on 25 September 1825, bound for Bengal. Eliza reached São Tiago on 24 October. She arrived at Garden Reach on 22 February 1826, and Kidderpore on 3 March. (Note: The British Library records conflate this Eliza with an India-built Eliza of 639 or 682 tons (bm), built in 1816, that carried out a voyage for the EIC in 1829.)

=== Third convict transport voyage (1827-1828) ===
In 1827, her master changed from W. Faith to D. Leary, her owner from G. Faith to Heatorn, and her trade from London—Calcutta to London—New South Wales.

On her next convict voyage under the command of Daniel Leary and surgeon George Rutherford, she left Cork, Ireland on 19 July 1827, and arrived in Sydney on 8 November 1827. She embarked 192 male convicts and had no convict deaths en route. One guard died on the voyage.

Eliza departed Port Jackson on 8 April 1828, bound for London with produce.

=== Fourth convict transport voyage (1829-1830) ===
In 1829 Eliza's master changed from Leary to Nicholls.

On her fourth convict voyage, Eliza was under the command of William Nicholas and surgeon J. McTernan. She left Cork, Ireland, on 2 March 1829, and arrived in Sydney on 20 June. She embarked 171 male convicts, three of whom died on the voyage. She also carried 11 free boys joining their parents.

Eliza departed Port Jackson on 16 July 1829, bound for Mauritius. She arrived at Mauritius in mid September.

=== Fifth convict transport voyage (1831) ===
The Register of Shipping (1831) shows Eliza's master changing from J. Nicholas to Grove, and her owner from Cockerill to Heathorn.

For Eliza's fifth convict voyage she was under the command of John Groves and surgeon William Anderson. She left Portsmouth, England on 6 February 1831 and arrived at Hobart Town on 29 May. She embarked 224 male convicts and had no deaths en route. Eliza departed Hobart Town on 16 June, bound for Penang and Calcutta, in ballast.

== Fate ==
Lloyd's Register for 1835 has H. Crouch, master, and Gould, owner. It also gives her burthen as 538 tons, and her launch year as 1807.

Lloyd's Register for 1836 has Smith, master, Gould, owner, and trade London—"LoS'ol". It has also a subsequent notation: "Abandoned".

On 20 December 1836 as Eliza was sailing from London to Quebec, she became waterlogged and her decks were "blown up". Austerlitz saved her crew, who landed at Havre.
