= Middlesex (1783 EIC ship) =

British merchant ship trading to Asia 1783–1796

History

Great Britain
- Name: Middlesex
- Namesake: Middlesex
- Owner: Robert Williams
- Operator: British East India Company
- Builder: Adams & Barnard, Greenland Dock, Deptford, or Randall
- Launched: September 1783
- Fate: Wrecked 1796

General characteristics
- Tons burthen: 852, or 8523/94(bm)
- Length: Overall:142 ft 8 in (43.5 m); Keel:114 ft 5 in (34.9 m) (keel)
- Beam: 37 ft 5 in (11.4 m)
- Depth of hold: 14 ft 9 1/2 in (4.5 m)
- Propulsion: Sails
- Sail plan: Full-rigged ship
- Notes: Three decks

Middlesex was launched in 1783 as an East Indiaman for the British East India Company (EIC). She made five voyages for the EIC. Towards the end of the second of these some of her officers unsuccessfully mutinied. In 1795 she participated as a transport in the British military expedition to the West Indies. She stranded and became a total loss in 1796 as she returned from the expedition.

== Career ==
=== EIC voyages ===
EIC voyage #1 (1783–1785): (1) 1783/84 Madras and China. Captain John Rogers sailed from The Downs on 27 December 1783, bound for Madras and China. Middlesex reached the Cape of Good Hope on 19 March 1784, and arrived at Madras on 9 June. She sailed on to China and arrived at Whampoa anchorage on 3 October. Homeward bound, she crossed the Second Bar on 29 December, reached St Helena on 12 April 1785, and arrived at The Downs on 4 July.

EIC voyage #2 (1786–1787): Captain Rogers sailed from The Downs on 19 February 1786, again bound for Madras and China. Middlesex reached Madras on 16 July, and arrived at Whampoa on 19 November. Homeward bound, she crossed the Second Bar on 17 February 1787, reached St Helena on 27 June, and arrived at The Downs on 19 September.

About two weeks before Middlesex arrived back in England, some of her officers mutinied against Captain Rodgers. One of the secondary mutineers was her surgeon, Charles Christian, elder brother of Fletcher Christian, who would later lead the mutineers on HMS Bounty. Rodgers suppressed the mutiny. However, the EIC's Court of Directors fined him £500, and suspended him for a year for an unrelated matter. It also suspended some of the officers involved from service with the EIC, with terms that ranged from dismissal to two years' imprisonment for Charles Christian. Civil courts, however supported the mutinous officers, granting the plaintiffs some £3000 in damages. Because Middlesex returned just a few months before Bounty sailed on her ill-fated voyage to the South Pacific, Charles and Fletcher Christian had an opportunity to spend time with each other.

EIC voyage #3 (1789–1790): Captain Rodgers sailed from The Downs on 12 April 1789 (more than a year after his return and suspension). Middlesex was bound for China and she reached Whampoa on 25 August. Homeward bound, she crossed the Second Bar on 21 November, reached St Helena on 18 February 1790, and arrived at The Downs on 23 April.

EIC voyage #4 (1792–1793): Captain Rodgers sailed from Falmouth on 8 February 1792, bound for Bombay and China. Middelsex reached the Cape on 26 April and Bombay on 15 June; she arrived at Whampoa on 19 September. Homeward bound, she crossed the Second Bar on 26 November, reached St Helena on 23 March 1793, and arrived at The Downs on 16 June.

The EIC inspected the East Indiamen as they arrived and on 15 October fined Rodgers and eight other captains £100 each for having not stowed their cargoes in conformance with the Company's orders. The money was to go to Poplar Hospital. (Note: There was a second assessment, on 30 July 1794 of a fine, but whether this was a restatement or a separate assessment is unclear.)

EIC voyage #5 (1794–1795): The British government held Middlesex at Portsmouth, together with a number of other Indiamen, in anticipation of using them as transports for an attack on Île de France (Mauritius). It gave up the plan and released the vessels in May 1794. It paid £458 6s 8d for having delayed her departure by 22 days.

Captain Rodgers sailed from Portsmouth on 2 May, bound for China. She arrived at Whampoa on 14 October. Homeward bound, she crossed the Second Bar on 28 December, reached St Helena on 14 April 1795, and arrived at The Downs on 23 July.

=== 1795 West Indies Expedition ===
The Government chartered Middlesex, and a number of other EIC vessels, as transports for Admiral Hugh Cloberry Christian 1795 expedition to the West Indies. The expedition sailed on 6 October, 16 November, and 9 December, but weather forced the vessels to put back. The fleet finally successfully sailed on 20 March to invade St Lucia, with troops under Lieutenant-General Sir Ralph Abercromby. St Lucia surrendered to the British on 25 May. The British went on to capture Saint Vincent and Grenada.

== Loss ==
Pilot error led to Middlesex stranding on 13 August 1796 on a sandbank off Erith Reach. Lloyd's List reported that Middlesex was returning from Barbados and that it was feared that her cargo would be lost. The pilot had ignored the ship's officers who had warned that she drew too much water for the route he had chosen. Another major problem was that the Royal Navy had pressed much of her crew when she returned, leaving her short-handed.

The stranding broke her back and Middlesex became a total loss. Small craft, however, had saved part of her cargo of sugar and cotton. At an auction on 7 September at Lloyd's Coffee House her hull sold for £270, and the remains of her cargo for £190.
