= Duchess of Portland =

The Duchess of Portland refers to the wife or widow of a Duke of Portland, a former title in the peerage of Great Britain. The title was created in 1716 but became extinct in 1990 upon the death of the ninth Duke.

== Duchesses of Portland ==
- Elizabeth Bentinck, Duchess of Portland (née Lady Elizabeth Noel) (1688–1737), wife of Henry Bentinck, 1st Duke of Portland
- Margaret Bentinck, Duchess of Portland (née Lady Margaret Harley) (1715–1785), British aristocrat, wife of William Bentinck, 2nd Duke of Portland
- Dorothy Bentinck, Duchess of Portland (née Lady Dorothy Cavendish) (1750–1794), wife of William Cavendish-Bentinck, 3rd Duke of Portland
- Henrietta Bentinck, Duchess of Portland (née Henrietta Scott) (1774–1844), wife of William Bentinck, 4th Duke of Portland
- Winifred Cavendish-Bentinck, Duchess of Portland (née Winifred Dallas-Yorke) (1863–1954), British humanitarian and animal rights activist, wife of William Cavendish-Bentinck, 6th Duke of Portland
- Ivy Cavendish-Bentinck, Duchess of Portland (née Ivy Gordon-Lennox) (1887–1982), founder of the Harley Gallery and Foundation, wife of William Cavendish-Bentinck, 7th Duke of Portland
- Gwyneth Ethel Cavendish-Bentinck, Duchess of Portland (née Gwyneth Ethel Edwards) (1907–1986), wife of Ferdinand Cavendish-Bentinck, 8th Duke of Portland
- Kathleen Elsie Cavendish-Bentinck, Duchess of Portland (née Kathleen Elsie Barry) (1911–2004), wife of Victor Cavendish-Bentinck, 9th Duke of Portland
