= William Cavendish-Bentinck, 7th Duke of Portland =

British peer and Conservative Party politician

His Grace The Duke of Portland KG
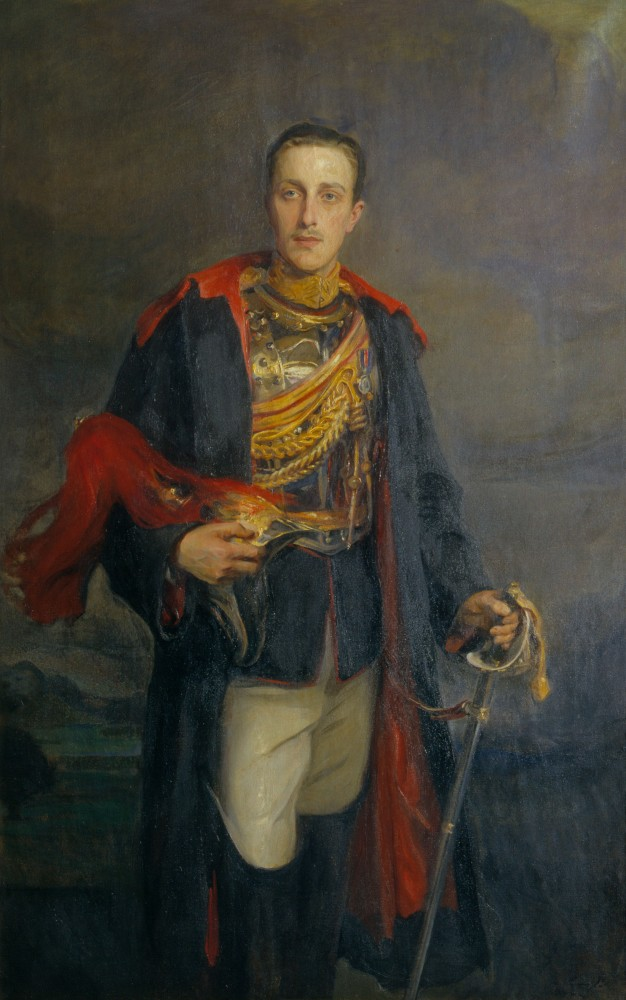
- Portrait by Philip de László, 1914

Member of Parliament for Newark
- In office 1922–1943

Lord Lieutenant of Nottinghamshire
- In office 1939–1962

Personal details
- Born: 16 March 1893 Mayfair, London, England
- Died: 21 March 1977 (aged 84) Welbeck Abbey, Nottinghamshire, England
- Spouse: Ivy Gordon-Lennox (m. 1915)
- Children: Lady Anne Cavendish-Bentinck; Lady Margaret Parente
- Parents: William Cavendish-Bentinck, 6th Duke of Portland; Winifred Anna Dallas-Yorke

William Arthur Henry Cavendish-Bentinck, 7th Duke of Portland, KG (16 March 1893 – 21 March 1977), styled Marquess of Titchfield until 1943, was a British peer and Conservative politician.

== Biography ==
Portland was the elder son of William Cavendish-Bentinck, 6th Duke of Portland, and his wife, Winifred Anna (née Dallas-Yorke). He was elected to the House of Commons as Member of Parliament (MP) for Newark in 1922, a seat he held until he succeeded his father in the dukedom in 1943, and served as a Junior Lord of the Treasury under Stanley Baldwin from 1927 to 1929 and under Ramsay MacDonald in 1932. He also held the honorary posts of Lord Lieutenant of Nottinghamshire between 1939 and 1962 and was the second Chancellor of the University of Nottingham between 1954 and 1971. In 1948 he was made a Knight Companion of the Garter. He also held the appointment of the honorary air commodore of No. 616 Squadron RAF.

== Marriage and children ==
Portland married Ivy Gordon-Lennox, daughter of Colonel Lord Algernon Charles Gordon-Lennox and granddaughter of Charles Gordon-Lennox, 6th Duke of Richmond, on 12 August 1915. They had two daughters:

- Lady (Alexandra Margaret) Anne Cavendish-Bentinck (6 September 1916 – 21 December 2008)
- Lady (Victoria) Margaret Cavendish-Bentinck (9 October 1918 – 29 August 1955)

He died in March 1977, aged 84, and was interred at the traditional burial place of the Dukes of Portland, in the churchyard of St Winifred's Church at Holbeck.

He was succeeded in the dukedom by his third cousin Ferdinand Cavendish-Bentinck. The subsidiary title Baron Bolsover became extinct on the death.

The heir to the Duke's titles was a distant cousin. Rather than allow the entailed estates to pass with the titles, the Duke arranged to break the entails and thus enrich his own daughters while permanently denuding the titles of both wealth and long-standing rootedness in land and country. The family seat of Welbeck Abbey passed to his elder daughter, Lady Anne, who never married; upon her death, it passed to the son of her deceased younger sister, Lady Margaret, who had died in 1955 aged 36. Lady Margaret had been married to Don Gaetano Parente, Principe di Castel Viscardo, Italy. Her son, named William Henry Marcello Parente (born 18 February 1951), inherited the estates and later served as High Sheriff of Nottinghamshire in 2003. Meanwhile, the 8th Duke of Portland, who had inherited the titles, continued to live very modestly in Nairobi.

Portland was a second cousin of Queen Elizabeth the Queen Mother.

== Wealth ==
Little is published of his wealth. His probate was sworn in 1977 at £4,391,478 (equivalent to about £25,800,000 in 2025), three times that of his father's assets passing at point of death (in real terms).

== Ancestry ==
Ancestors of William Cavendish-Bentinck, 7th Duke of Portland

8. Lord Charles Cavendish-Bentinck
4. Arthur Cavendish-Bentinck
9. Anne Wellesley
2. William Cavendish-Bentinck, 6th Duke of Portland
10. Sir St. Vincent Hawkins-Whitshed, 2nd Baronet
5. Elizabeth Hawkins-Whitshed
11. Hon. Elizabeth Erskine
1. William Cavendish-Bentinck, 7th Duke of Portland
12. David Haliburton Dallas
6. Thomas Dallas-Yorke
13. Mary Ann Yorke
3. Winifred Dallas-Yorke
14. William Graham
7. Frances Graham
15. Anna Lowndes

== Arms ==
Coat of arms of William Cavendish-Bentinck, 7th Duke of Portland
Notes The title Duke of Portland was created by George I in 1716 . Coronet A Coronet of a Duke Crest Out of a ducal coronet proper two arms counter-embowed vested Gules, on the hands gloves Or, each holding an ostrich feather Argent (Bentinck); A snake nowed proper (Cavendish) Escutcheon Quarterly: 1st and 4th, Azure a cross moline Argent (Bentinck); 2nd and 3rd, Sable three stags' heads cabossed Argent attired Or, a crescent for difference (Cavendish) Supporters Two lions double queued, the dexter Or and the sinister sable Motto Craignez Honte (Fear Dishonour) Orders The Most Noble Order of the Garter - Knight Companion (KG)

Parliament of the United Kingdom
Preceded by John Ralph Starkey	Member of Parliament for Newark; 1922–1943	Succeeded by Sidney Shephard
Honorary titles
Preceded by The Duke of Portland	Lord Lieutenant of Nottinghamshire; 1939–1962	Succeeded by Sir Robert Laycock
Academic offices
Preceded by The Lord Trent	Chancellor of the University of Nottingham; 1954–1971	Succeeded by Sir Francis Hill
Peerage of Great Britain
Preceded by William Cavendish-Bentinck	Duke of Portland; 1943–1977	Succeeded by Ferdinand Cavendish-Bentinck
Peerage of the United Kingdom
Preceded by William Cavendish-Bentinck	Baron Bolsover; 1943–1977	Extinct
