= Lady Anne Cavendish-Bentinck =

British noblewoman and landowner

- Born: 6 September 1916; Kensington, London
- Died: 29 December 2008 (aged 92); Welbeck, Nottinghamshire, England
- Parent(s): William Cavendish-Bentinck, 7th Duke of Portland; Ivy Gordon-Lennox

Lady Alexandra Margaret Anne Cavendish-Bentinck (6 September 1916 – 29 December 2008) was a member of the British nobility and one of the richest landowners in the country. She was a notable charity worker, art collector, and horsewoman.

== Family ==
Lady Anne Cavendish-Bentinck was born in Kensington, the daughter of Conservative politician William Cavendish-Bentinck, 7th Duke of Portland. Her mother was Ivy Gordon-Lennox, daughter of Lord Algernon Charles Gordon-Lennox, son of Charles Gordon-Lennox, 6th Duke of Richmond. Lord Algernon was a close friend of Queen Alexandra, who was Lady Anne's godmother.

Cavendish-Bentinck came from an aristocratic family rooted in the height of the Anglo-Dutch ascendancy, the Glorious Revolution. Hans Willem Bentinck came to Britain from Holland with William of Orange in 1670 and was created Earl of Portland in 1689. His son, Henry, 2nd Earl, was created Duke of Portland in 1716.

The family accumulated property nationwide, including land in Marylebone, later redeveloped as part of Westminster, leading to Bentinck Street, Cavendish Square, Great Portland Street, Portland Place, Harley Street, named after a line of the Earls of Oxford into which a Bentinck married, and Welbeck Street, named after their seat, Welbeck Abbey in Nottinghamshire.

Anne was related to Queen Elizabeth II and her surname was shared with the latter's maternal grandmother Cecilia Bowes-Lyon, Countess of Strathmore and Kinghorne; they shared a great-great grandfather, Lord Charles Bentinck.

Anne's paternal grandfather, William Cavendish-Bentinck, 6th Duke of Portland (1857–1943), broke the entail of the family estates and set up a trust ensuring that they and the family seat of Welbeck Abbey went to his eldest granddaughter on the death of her father, thus disinheriting later Bentinck heirs.

Anne had one sibling, a younger sister, Lady Victoria Margaret Parente (9 October 1918 –12 April 1950), who married Gaetano Parente, Prince of Castel Viscardo. As Anne had no brothers and was made her grandfather's heiress, she became very rich.

As the succession to the Dukedom of Portland was strictly in the male line, Anne's father was succeeded in his titles by his third cousin Ferdinand Cavendish-Bentinck. The dukedom and most of the other peerages became extinct in 1990 when the 9th Duke died without a male heir. However, the earldom of Portland was inherited by a male-line descendant of the first Duke's younger brother. The 12th and (as of 2023) present Earl of Portland is the actor Tim Bentinck, who plays David Archer in the BBC Radio 4 soap opera The Archers.

Lady Anne never married and had no children. Her obituary in the Daily Telegraph repeats the story that as a débutante, she refused to marry a Belgian nobleman, destined to be Prince Charles of the Belgians. When he came to ask for her hand in marriage she reportedly refused to get out of bed. She hoped instead to marry John Osborne, 11th Duke of Leeds, but her family prevented this.

Lady Anne's sole heir was her nephew, William Parente, who is married with two children. When he served as High Sheriff of Nottinghamshire for 2003–2004, The London Gazette gave his address as Welbeck Abbey.

== Interests ==
She was involved with many charities throughout her life. These included "causes for the blind", and the Girl Guides, whom she allowed to have a permanent camp at Welbeck, much to the annoyance of the caretakers. Lady Anne was the president of Nottinghamshire St. John Ambulance Brigade and the president of Portland College.

She enjoyed art; she possessed a treasure trove of art including works by Stubbs and van Dyke. She also had a sizable silver collection that she stored in her strongroom. In 1977 she helped establish the Harley Foundation, an art educational charity named after her ancestor, the collector Edward Harley, 2nd Earl of Oxford.

She was a horsewoman, riding until she was 90 years old. For about 20 years the Welbeck Estate had its own hunt, the Rufford Harriers, at which she hunted sidesaddle. While she never placed a bet, her horses were successful in their races, leading her to become a leading racehorse owner in Northern England.

She was described by an employee as "famously forthright, funny and practical, a devastatingly gifted mimic, and would have no truck with pomposity or preciousness." She drove her small jeep on the private roads of her estate until a few days before her death.

In the summer of 2000, she went over to the Castle of Mey for tea with her centenarian neighbour and cousin, the Queen Mother, who said after the visit: "She's very gruff. I've known her since she was a little girl. She was gruff then and she's gruff now."

== Property ==
Lady Anne's immediate family ranked 511th nationally by wealth, per the Sunday Times Rich List in 2008. Much of this wealth was in land and buildings. At the time of her death, she was said to own 17,000 acres (69 km^{2}) (just over 3%) of Nottinghamshire and 62,000 acres (250 km^{2}) in Scotland.

== Ancestry ==
Ancestors of Lady Anne Cavendish-Bentinck

16. Lord Charles Cavendish-Bentinck
8. Arthur Cavendish-Bentinck
17. Anne Wellesley
4. William Cavendish-Bentinck, 6th Duke of Portland
18. Sir St. Vincent Keene Hawkins-Whitshed, 2nd Baronet, of Killincarrick
9. Elizabeth Hawkins-Whitshed
19. The Hon. Elizabeth Erskine
2. William Cavendish-Bentinck, 7th Duke of Portland
20. David Dallas
10. Thomas Dallas-Yorke
21. Mary Yorke
5. Winifred Dallas-Yorke
22. William Graham
11. Frances Graham
23. Anna Lowndes
1. Lady Anne Cavendish-Bentinck
24. Charles Gordon-Lennox, 5th Duke of Richmond
12. Charles Gordon-Lennox, 6th Duke of Richmond
25. Lady Caroline Paget
6. Col. Lord Algernon Gordon-Lennox
26. Algernon Greville
13. Frances Harriett Greville
27. Charlotte Maria Cox
3. Ivy Gordon-Lennox
28. Henry Maynard, 3rd Viscount Maynard
14. Col. The Hon. Charles Maynard
29. Mary Rabett
7. Blanche Maynard
30. Henry Fitzroy
15. Blanche Adeliza Fitzroy
31. Jane Elizabeth Beauclerk
