= Ivy Cavendish-Bentinck, Duchess of Portland =

English noblewoman

Her Grace The Duchess of Portland DBE
- Duchess of Portland
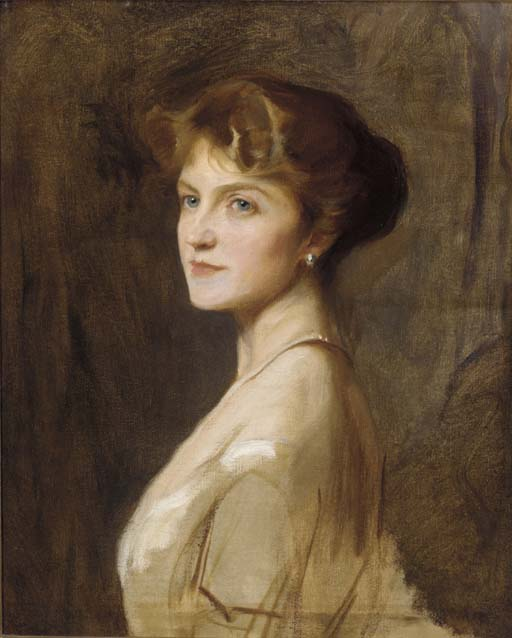
- Ivy Gordon-Lennox by Philip de László, 1915
- Born: Ivy Gordon-Lennox; 16 June 1887; London, England
- Died: 3 March 1982 (aged 94); Welbeck Woodhouse, Nottinghamshire, England
- Spouse: William Cavendish-Bentinck, 7th Duke of Portland
- Issue: Lady Anne Cavendish-Bentinck; Lady Victoria Parente
- Parents: Lord Algernon Gordon-Lennox; Dame Blanche Gordon-Lennox, DBE

Ivy Cavendish-Bentinck, Duchess of Portland DBE (née Gordon-Lennox; 16 June 1887 – 3 March 1982) was Duchess of Portland from 1943 – 1977 and afterwards Dowager Duchess. She initiated the Harley Foundation, "to encourage creativity".

== Family background and early years ==
Ivy Gordon-Lennox was born in London on 16 June 1887, the daughter of Colonel Lord Algernon Charles Gordon-Lennox (19 September 1847, London – 3 October 1921) and his wife, Blanche, Lady Algernon Gordon-Lennox (née Maynard; 14 February 1864, London – 17 August 1945), who were married at Easton on 31 August 1886. Ivy was their only child.

Her father was the second of the four sons of the 6th Duke of Richmond (1818–1903), and his obituary in The Times called him "a notable social figure, whose popularity it would be difficult to over-estimate". He served in the Royal Navy, the Life Guards, and the Grenadier Guards, and was twelve years aide-de-camp to The Duke of Cambridge, Commander-in-chief of the British Army. His brothers, Ivy's uncles, included the 7th Duke of Richmond (1845–1928), Captain Lord Francis Gordon-Lennox, who died before she was born, and Lord Walter Gordon-Lennox (1865–1922), a Conservative Member of Parliament.

Her mother was the younger daughter of Colonel the Hon. Charles Maynard, a son of the 3rd Viscount Maynard. The older daughter was Daisy Greville, Countess of Warwick, and her other maternal aunts, the daughters of her grandmother's second marriage, were Millicent Leveson-Gower, Duchess of Sutherland, Sybil Fane, Countess of Westmorland, and Lady Angela Forbes.

Blanche, Lady Algernon Gordon-Lennox, Ivy's mother, was appointed a Dame Commander of the Order of the British Empire (DBE) in 1919; Ivy herself received the same honour in 1958.

Ivy Gordon-Lennox's parents had a country house, Broughton Castle, near Banbury, which was rented from the 18th Lord Saye and Sele, and a house in London at 7 Chesterfield Street, Mayfair.

== Early adulthood and marriage ==
In September 1910, Lady Algernon Gordon-Lennox took firm action to quell a rumour that her daughter was engaged to marry Edward Turnour, 6th Earl Winterton. A notice to this purpose appeared in the New York Times, reading:

Ivy Gordon-Lennox Not Engaged. Special Cable to The New York Times. London, Sept. 24 [1910]. Lady Algernon Gordon-Lennox contradicts the report current in London, and referred to in these dispatches last week, of the engagement of her daughter, Ivy, to Earl Winterton.

Winterton married the Hon. Cecilia Monica Wilson in 1924, and died childless in 1962.

On 1 January 1912, Ivy Gordon-Lennox was appointed a Maid of Honour to Queen Alexandra, the queen mother. In 1915, during the First World War, she was Princess Victoria's representative in connection with proposed Nurses' Clubs in France, travelling to Étaples and Abbeville (for context, see Queen Alexandra's Royal Army Nursing Corps).

On 12 August 1915, Ivy Gordon-Lennox married William Cavendish-Bentinck, Marquess of Titchfield (1893–1977), son of the 6th Duke of Portland and his wife Winifred Anna Dallas-Yorke. She was six years older than him. Three portraits of the bride were painted by Philip de László.

== Later life ==
From 1922-43, Lady Titchfield was a political wife, her husband representing Newark in the House of Commons and serving as a Junior Lord of the Treasury under Stanley Baldwin and again under Ramsay MacDonald.

In 1943, Ivy Titchfield became Duchess of Portland when her father-in-law died and her husband inherited his father's titles.

In 1977, the Duchess set up the Harley Foundation intended "to encourage creativity in all of us". She intended it to help artists by providing affordable work-space in quiet surroundings, to support the survival of specialist craft skills in an age of mass production, and to improve public access to the visual arts. The Foundation was granted a long lease of some properties at Welbeck and it now maintains three sets of studios there, with space for up to thirty artists and craft-workers, plus a gallery and craft shop.

The Duchess died at Welbeck Woodhouse, Nottinghamshire, on 3 March 1982, aged 94. She is buried at the traditional burial place of the Dukes of Portland in the churchyard of St Winifred's Church at Holbeck.

== Descendants ==
The Duke and Duchess of Portland had two daughters, Lady Anne Cavendish-Bentinck, born on 6 September 1916; and Lady Victoria Margaret Cavendish-Bentinck, born on 9 October 1918.

The first daughter remained unmarried throughout her life and was known as Lady Anne Bentinck. In April 2008, at the age of ninety-one, she was reported in the Sunday Times Rich List to be the 511th richest person in the United Kingdom, with a fortune estimated at £158 million, largely in art and land. She died on 21 December 2008.

The second daughter, Lady Victoria, married the Italian Don Gaetano Parente, Principe di Castel Viscardo, on 12 April 1950. She had one son, William Henry Marcello Parente (b. 1951), and died on 29 August 1955, aged 36. The Portlands' only grandchild, William Parente, of Welbeck Abbey, was appointed High Sheriff of Nottinghamshire in 2003.

== Ancestry ==
Ancestors of Ivy Cavendish-Bentinck, Duchess of Portland

8. Charles Gordon-Lennox, 5th Duke of Richmond
4. Charles Gordon-Lennox, 6th Duke of Richmond
9. Lady Caroline Paget
2. Colonel Lord Algernon Gordon-Lennox
10. Algernon Greville
5. Frances Harriett Greville
11. Charlotte Maria Cox
1. Ivy Cavendish-Bentinck, Duchess of Portland
12. Henry Maynard, 3rd Viscount Maynard
6. Colonel The Hon. Charles Maynard
13. Mary Rabett
3. Blanche Maynard
14. Henry Fitzroy
7. Blanche Adeliza Fitzroy
15. Jane Elizabeth Beauclerk
