= Welbeck Abbey =

Stately Home and former monastery in Nottinghamshire, England

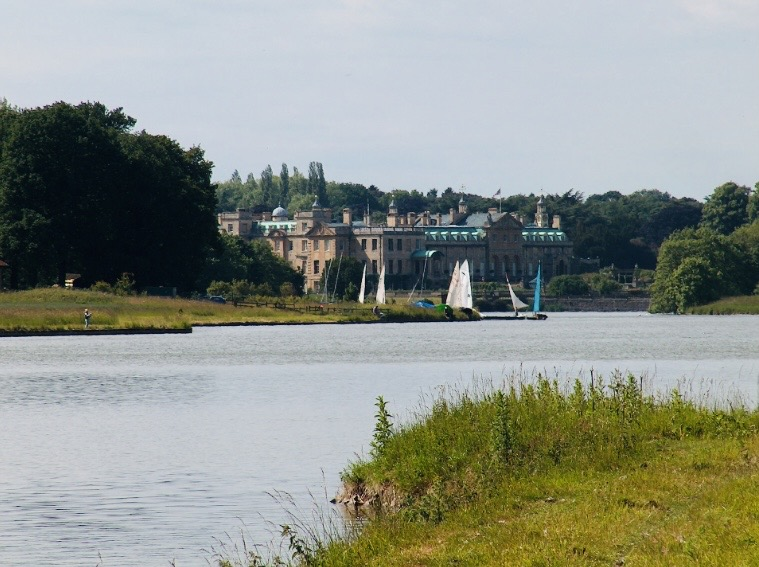
- The abbey from the lake

- Location within Nottinghamshire

General information
- Location: Welbeck Worksop Nottinghamshire S80 3LL, United Kingdom
- Coordinates: 53.262150°N 1.156029°W
- Owner: Dukes of Newcastle and Dukes of Portland

Design and construction
- Designations: Grade I listed building

Website
- https://www.welbeck.co.uk/

Listed Building – Grade I
- Official name: Welbeck Abbey
- Designated: 8 February 1972
- Reference no.: 1224867

National Register of Historic Parks and Gardens
- Designated: 1 January 1986
- Reference no.: 1000556

Welbeck Abbey is a historic country house near the village of Welbeck in the Bassetlaw District of Nottinghamshire, situated in the Dukeries, four contiguous ducal estates, between Worksop and Ollerton. Founded in 1140 as a Premonstratensian monastery dedicated to St James the Great, it flourished for nearly four centuries before its dissolution under Henry VIII in 1538. Though the medieval abbey was largely transformed in later centuries, elements of its monastic fabric remain embedded within the present structure, linking the estate to its religious origins.

In the late 16th century Welbeck entered the orbit of the Cavendish family and evolved from former abbey into one of England’s great aristocratic seats. Under William Cavendish, 1st Duke of Newcastle, a devoted royalist and celebrated authority on horsemanship—the house became a centre of courtly hospitality and equestrian culture. Both James I and Charles I of England were entertained at Welbeck, and substantial architectural additions, including a notable 17th-century riding house, reshaped the former monastic complex into a grand ducal residence.

Through inheritance and marriage the estate later passed to the Bentinck family, Dukes of Portland, who retained it as their principal seat for generations. In the 20th century Welbeck served military and educational purposes before returning to private residential use in the early 21st century. Today, while the house itself remains private, parts of the wider estate accommodate cultural, educational and artisan enterprises.

== History ==
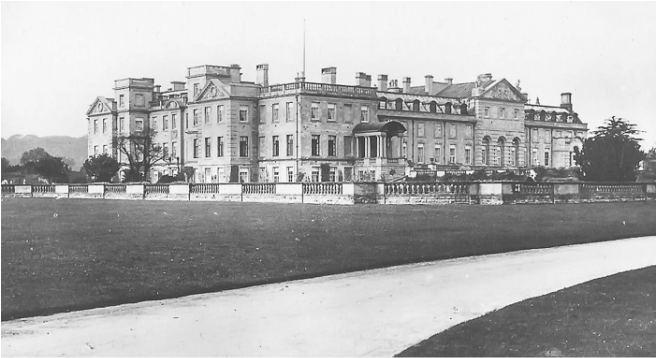
The south east front of Welbeck Abbey after its reconstruction by the 6th Duke of Portland in the aftermath of the 1900 Oxford wing fire

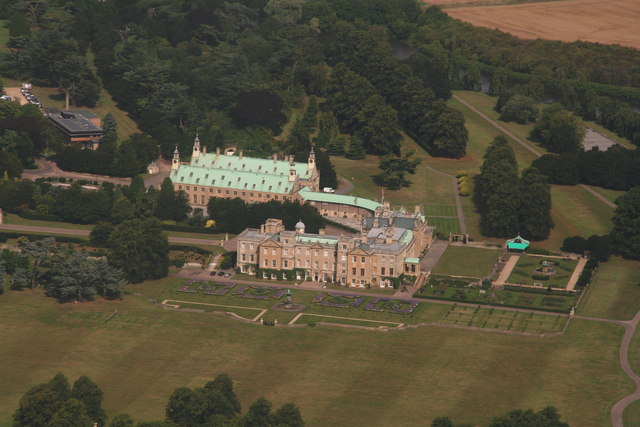
Welbeck Abbey seen from the air with the riding school in the back (2013)

=== Foundation and Premonstratensian Abbey ===
The estate was mentioned in the Domesday Book of 1086, where it is recorded as belonging to Hugh fitzBaldric. Thomas de Cuckney founded the religious house in 1140. It was an abbey of Premonstratensian canons, dedicated to St James the Great. The abbey was enriched by gifts from the Goushills, D’Eyncourts, Bassets, and other families from Nottinghamshire and it received a considerable grant from King Edward I.

In 1393 the abbey came under serious investigation by King Richard II.

Pardon to William Broun of Norton by Welbeck of suit of the King’s peace for felonies, treasons and other offences under the following circumstances: Robert Veel, keeper of the rolls of the King’s Bench, and John Wynchecombe, appointed by the king to take carts for the carriage of the rolls, being directed on Saturday before the feast of St Katherine last by Walter Clopton, Chief Justice, and other justices to carry the said rolls from York to Nottingham, where upon by reason of excessive rainfall affecting the roads, they could not without additional horses reach Nottingham, where upon by virtue of their commission and the justices order they took at Norton aforesaid two horses of John Levet and John Turnour of Norton, to be paid for in due course. There upon the said William Broun, John Northeryn, Robert Bocher, all of Norton, and Hugh Matt, servant of John Baukwell, Abbot of Welbeck, with divers other evil doers came armed with bows and arrows, sticks and swords, and at dusk of the same day raised all the men of Norton to insurrection, pursued the said Robert and John to Warsop and instigated by Simon de Castleton, canon of Welbeck, and John Worsop, vicar of Cuckney and canon of Welbeck, assaulted them, shot at and pierced the books in the carriage and took the horses, and would have carried the same away but that by the grace of God and their help they made too good a defence.

With so much wealth at his disposal, the Abbot of Welbeck was an influential man, and in 1512 all the houses of the order in England were placed under his care. In 1538, the abbot, Richard Bentley was awarded a pension of £50 (equivalent to £40,141 as of 2025),, and the 17 canons received pensions of between £40 (equivalent to £32,113 as of 2025) and £4 (equivalent to £3,211 as of 2025) a year.

=== The Dissolution and the Cavendish Dukes of Newcastle ===
At the Dissolution of the Monasteries, the site was granted by King Henry VIII to Richard Whalley, of Screveton. After being owned by a City of London clothier, the abbey was purchased by Gilbert, 7th Earl of Shrewsbury for the sum of £555 6s 6d (equivalent to £151,706 as of 2025) in 1599. Gilbert was he stepson of the formidable Bess of Hardwick. Through her careful dynastic manoeuvring, Welbeck ultimately came into the hands of her third son, Sir Charles Cavendish, who became owner in 1607. Robert Smythson produced a plan to rebuild Welbeck Abbey, but only small parts of the proposal were carried out, such as the south wing, which later became known as the Oxford wing.

Charles's son, William Cavendish, inherited the estate and rose to prominence as a devoted royalist, celebrated horseman and author on equitation. Created 1st Duke of Newcastle-upon-Tyne and widely known as “The Loyal Duke,” he entertained both James I and Charles I at Welbeck and Bolsover Castle. During the 17th century the Cavendishes transformed the former abbey into a substantial country house, retaining only portions of the medieval fabric. A notable addition were the riding house and the stables, constructed to the designs by John Smythson, son of Robert.

Following the outbreak of the Civil War, the Duke went into exile in the Netherlands. There he established a riding school in Antwerp and published his influential treatise Nouvelle Méthode de Dresser les Chevaux (1658). After the Restoration he returned to England and retired to Welbeck, continuing his lifelong dedication to the training and study of horses.

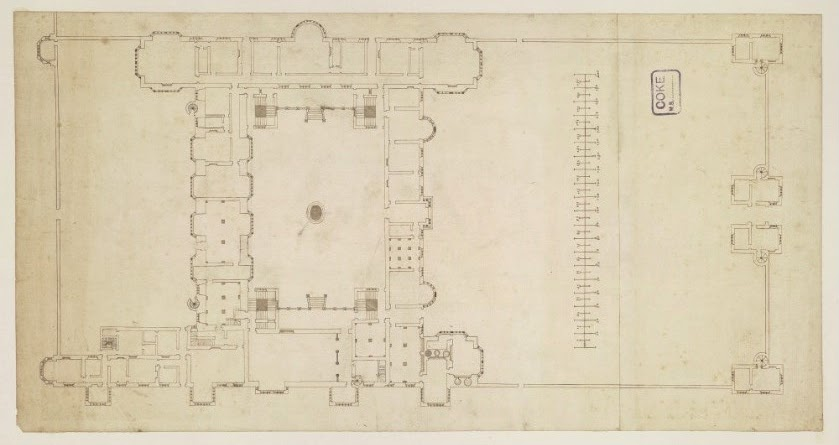
Robert Smythson's plan to rebuild Welbeck Abbey. Nothing was realized except the Oxford wing which is on the left below in the plan

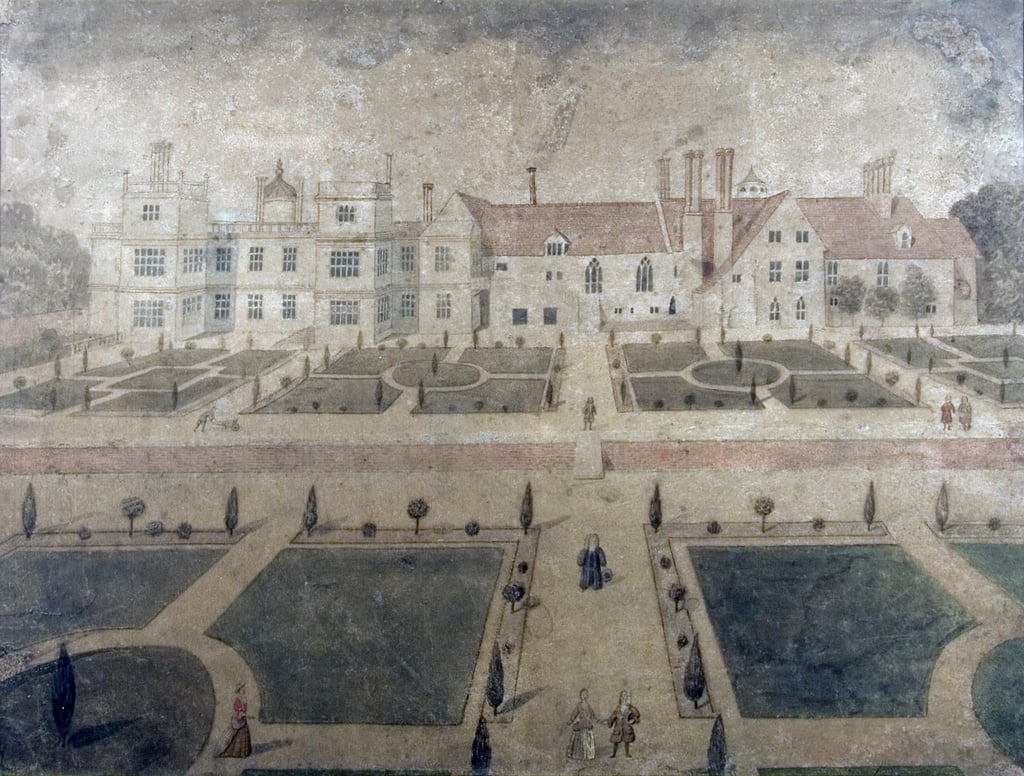
The south front of Welbeck Abbey in the 17th century, with the Oxford Wing on the left and an earlier monastic wing on the right, which was demolished in the late 18th century

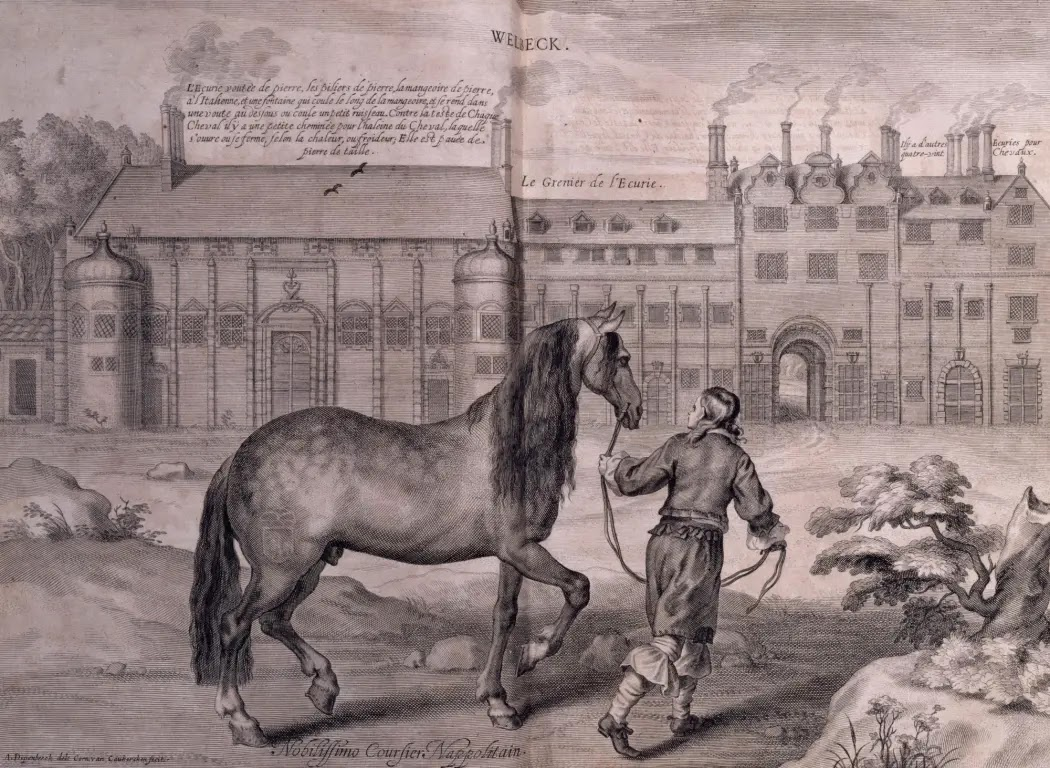
The entrance with the stables on the left, both demolished as part of the alterations under Lady Oxford

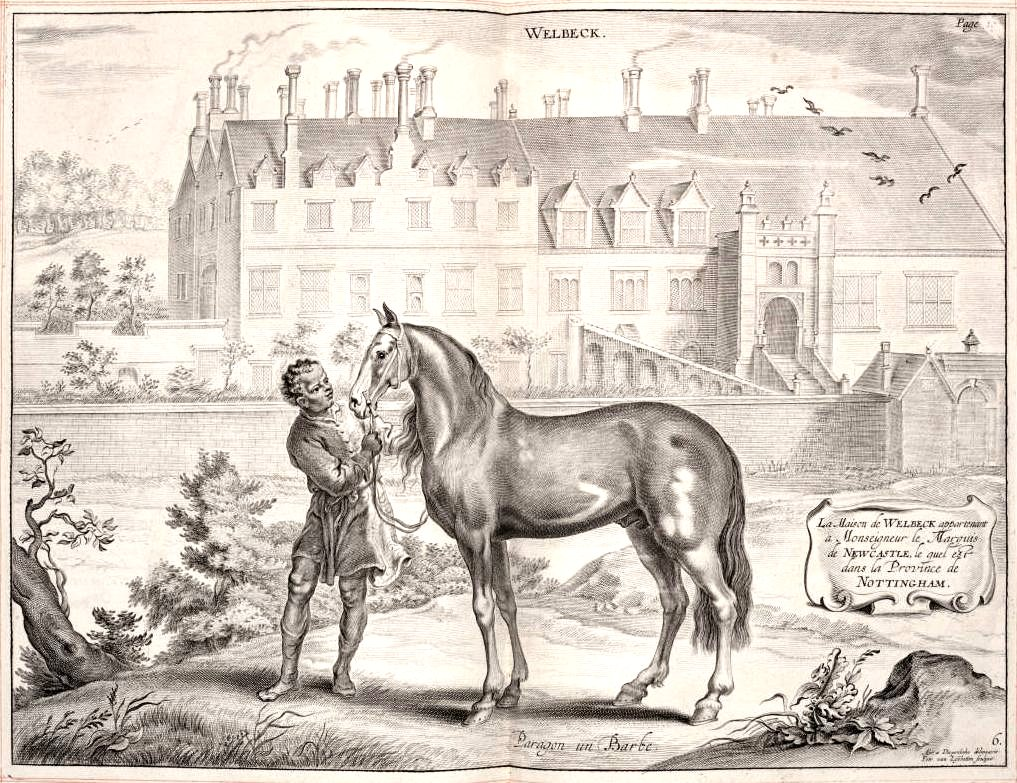
The west front of the North Wing of Welbeck Abbey in the 17th century

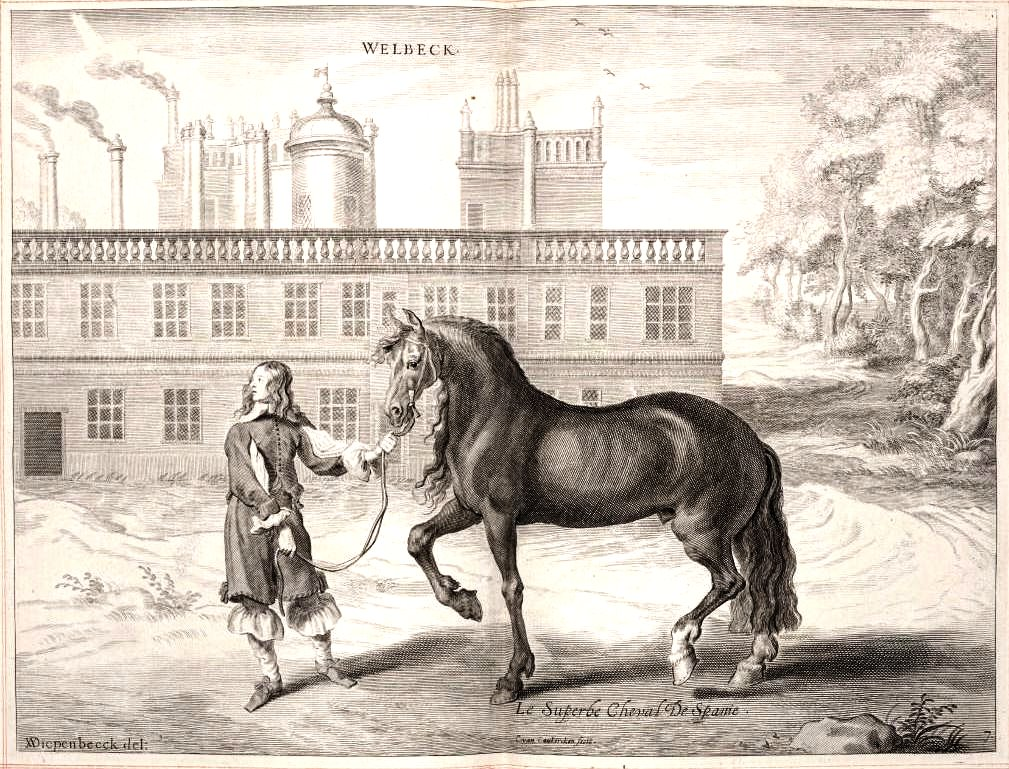
The Oxford wing

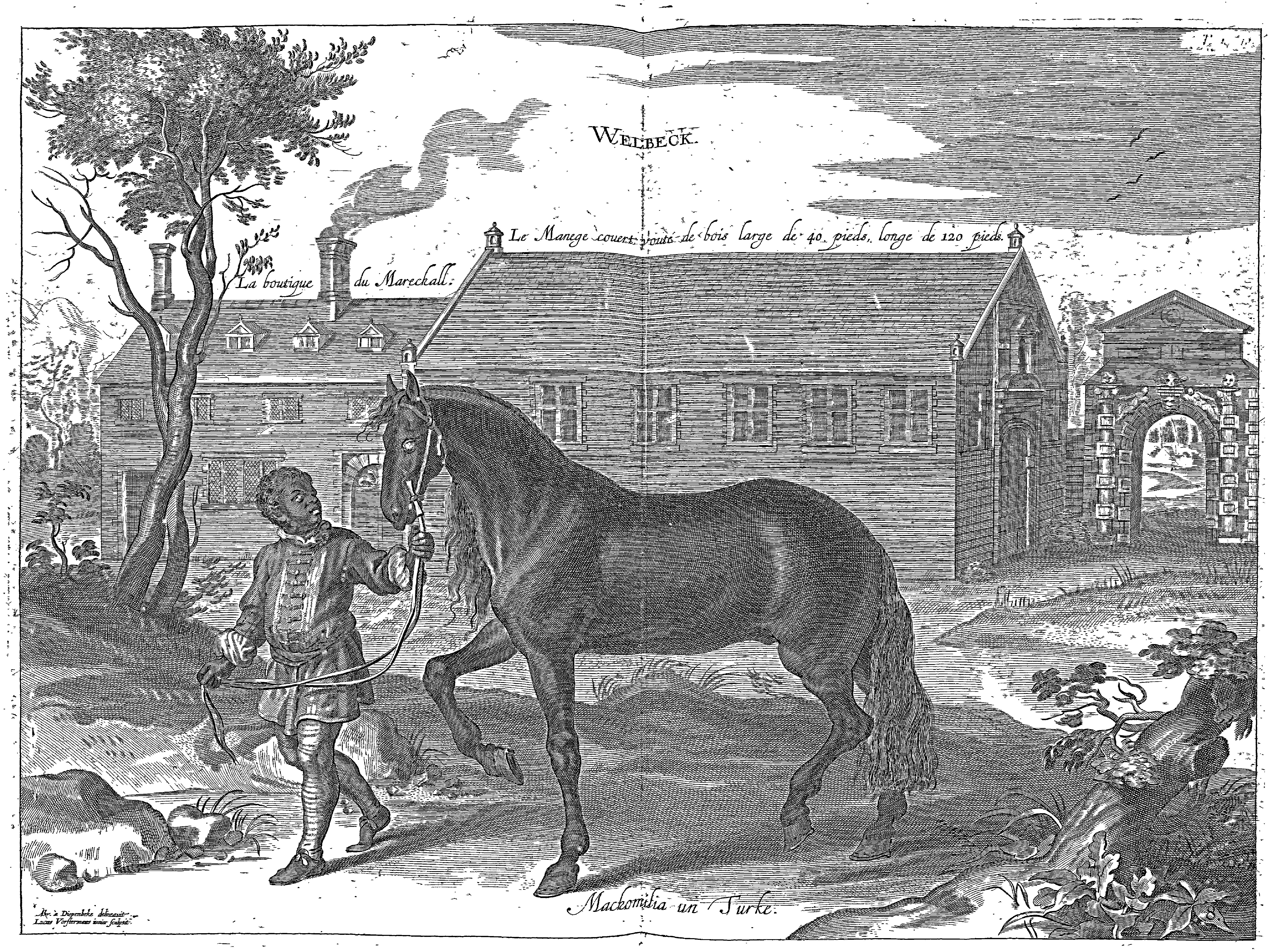
The riding hall at Welbeck Abbey, which were converted into stables under Lady Oxford

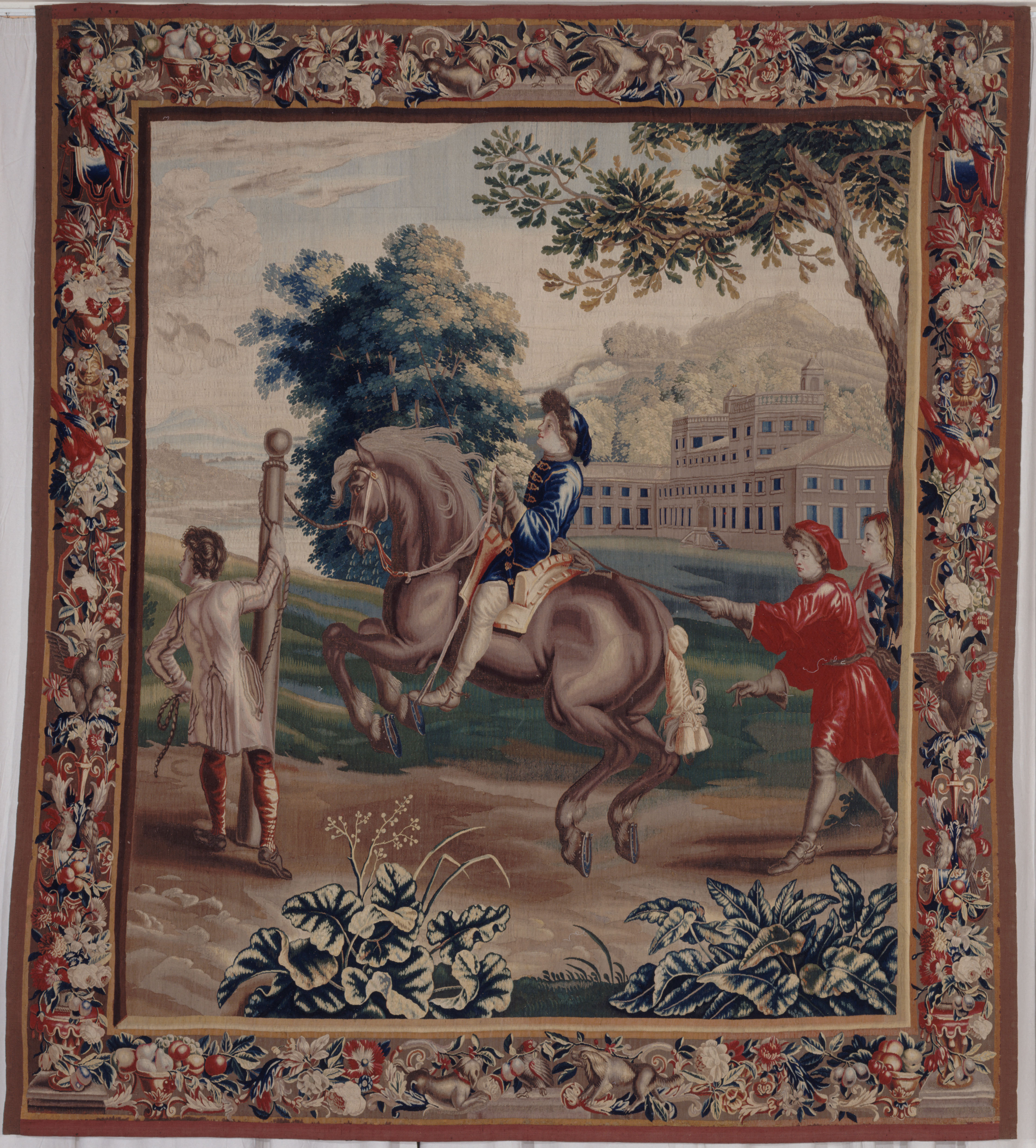
Welbeck Abbey as depicted on a 17th-century tapestry (1658), after an illustration in William Cavendish, 1st Duke of Newcastle’s book on horsemanship

=== The Bentinck Inheritance and the Dukes of Portland ===
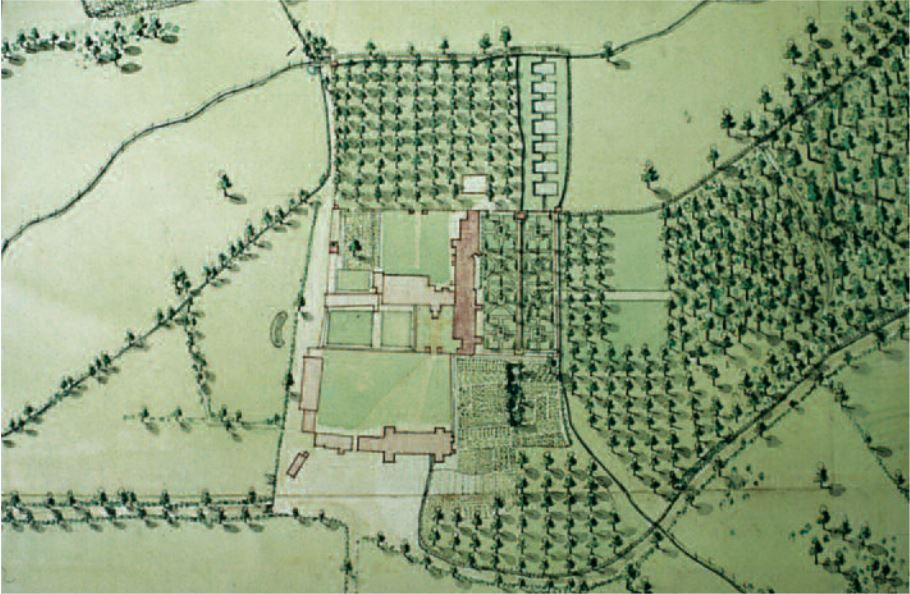
Plan of Welbeck Abbey and its surroundings before Lady Oxford started her alterations. Bottom left is the old riding school, bottom right the stables, and on top the main house with the monastic wing still intact

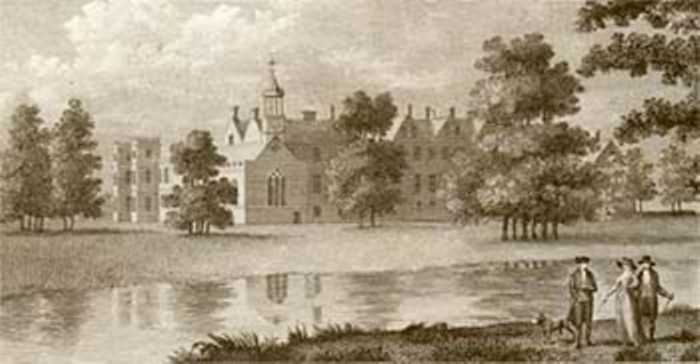
Welbeck Abbey in 1788 showing the south and east front including the monastic wing which was later demolished

The succession then passed through a line of heiresses. The 2nd Duke’s daughter, Lady Margaret Cavendish, married John Holles, briefly reviving the dukedom of Newcastle, though it again became extinct. Their daughter, Lady Henrietta Cavendish-Holles, inherited Welbeck and married Edward Harley, 2nd Earl of Oxford, son of the noted Tory statesman and collector of the Harleian Manuscripts. Henrietta restored Sir Charles Cavendish's house, and the rebuilt south wing became known as the Oxford Wing. Once again lacking a male heir, the estate descended to her daughter, Lady Margaret Cavendish-Holles-Harley.

Through her marriage to William Bentinck, 2nd Duke of Portland, Welbeck entered the Bentinck family, a noble Dutch house descended from Hans Willem Bentinck, close associate of king William III. Their son, William Henry Cavendish-Bentinck, 3rd Duke of Portland, inherited the estate and became one of its most distinguished owners, serving twice as Prime Minister under George III and as Viceroy of Ireland. Emphasising his Cavendish ancestry, he adopted the surname Cavendish-Bentinck, which has since remained with his descendants and firmly associated Welbeck with the Portland line.

18th-century alterations reshaped the house itself. For the 1st duke of Newcastle, in 1703, both William Talman and John Vanbrugh made designs for a new country house, which were not executed. Following a survey in 1741, the south wing was reconstructed and the west wing remodelled by John James (c. 1672–1746) for Lady Oxford between 1741 and 1752. Further changes to the east front were carried out in 1764–65 by John Carr of York, including the addition of a chapel in 1763.

In the later 18th century, the landscape surrounding Welbeck Abbey was significantly reconfigured. Land scape designer and architect Humphry Repton (1752–1818) prepared three so-called Red Books for the 3rd Duke of Portland in 1790, 1793 and 1803, which set out proposals to enhance both the house and its park. He recommended emphasising the piano nobile by concealing the basement behind a sloping bank, redesigning the pleasure grounds, deepening and extending the lakes, and constructing new bridges; one later proposal even suggested building a new house on higher ground to the north. The late 18th-century landscape park, developed by Francis Richardson and Repton, evolved from the former monastic grounds of the Premonstratensian abbey.

In the early 19th century the house was redecorated in a castellated style, giving it a more romantic appearance. After the sale of Bulstrode Park in 1810, Welbeck Abbey became the principal seat of the Dukes of Portland.

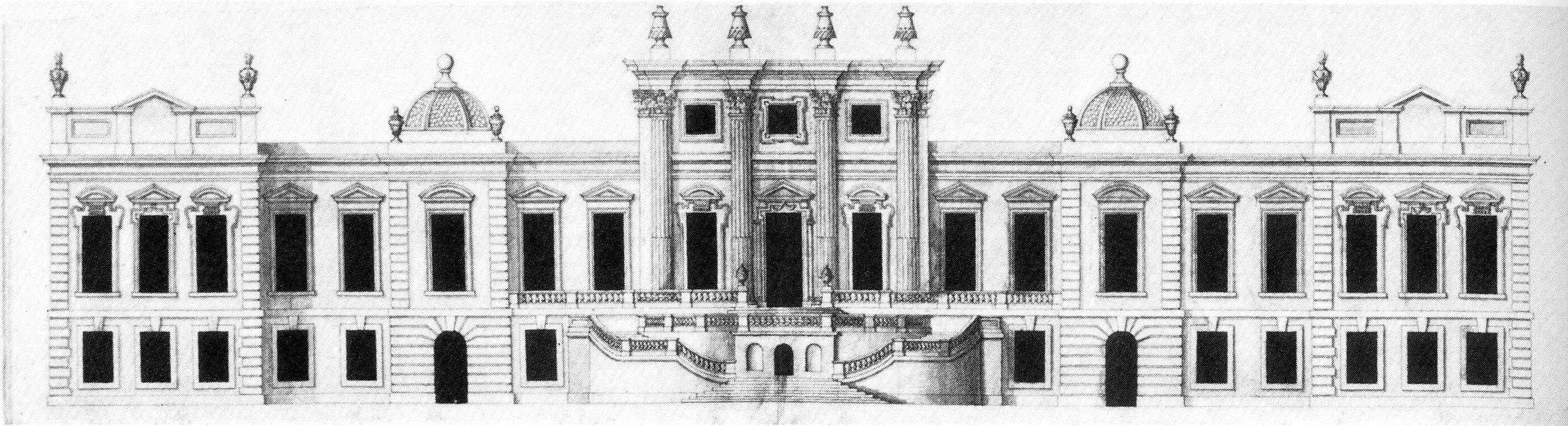
The unexecuted design for a new country house by William Talman (1703)

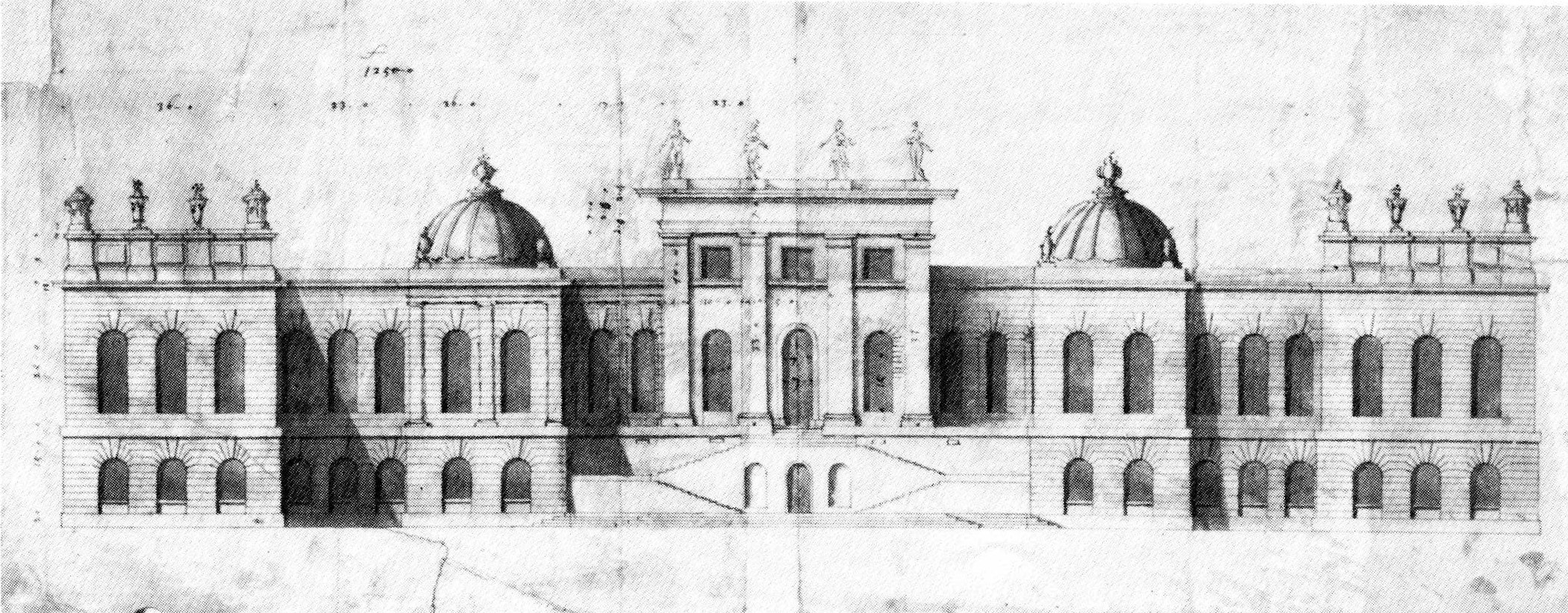
The unexecuted design for a new country house by John Vanbrugh (1703)

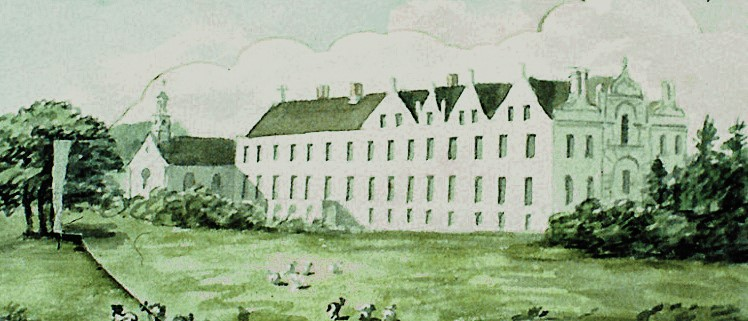
The east front of the North wing after the alterations by Lady Oxford (around 1750)

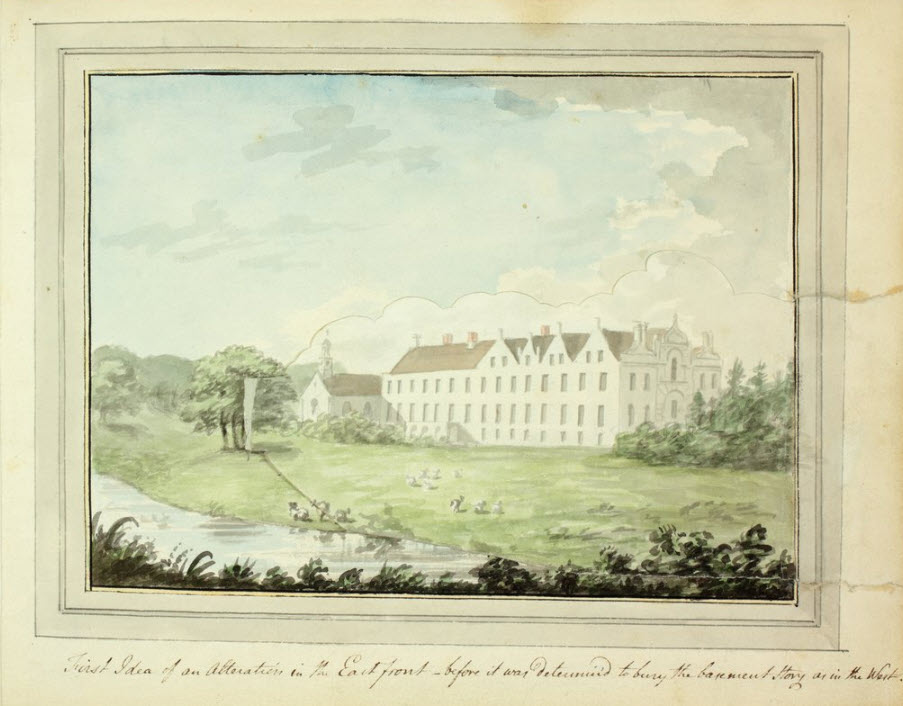
View of the east front by Humphry Repton (1790)

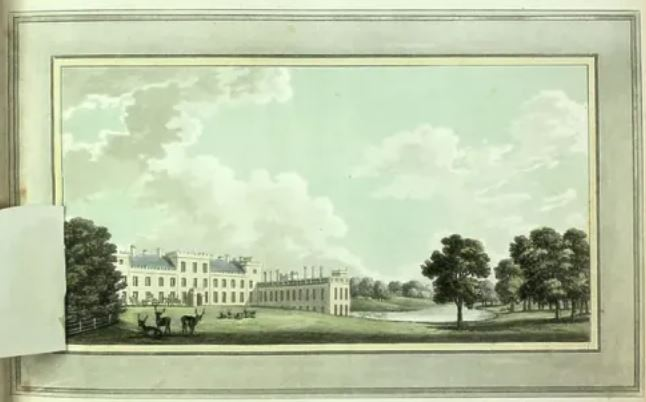
View of Welbeck Abbey by Humphry Repton (1790)

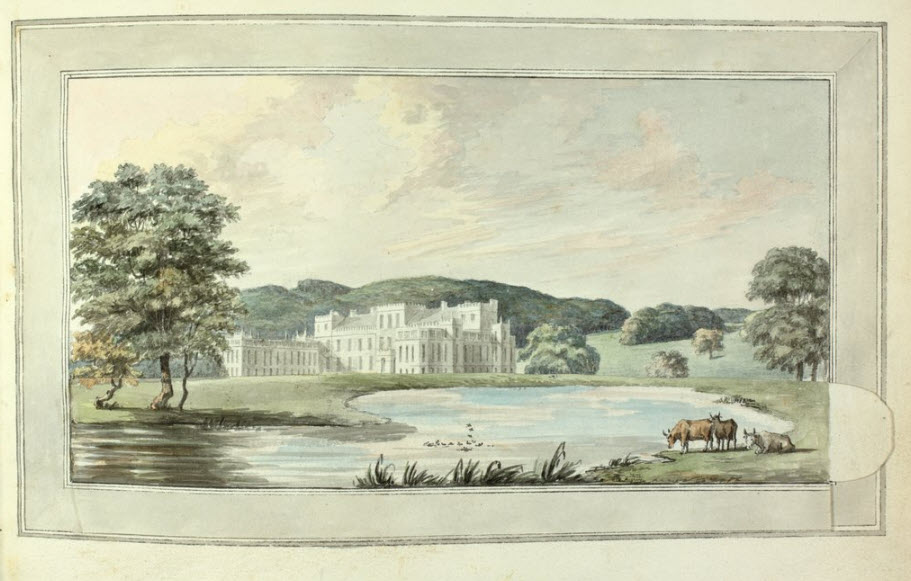
Proposal for the west front by Humphry Repton (1790)

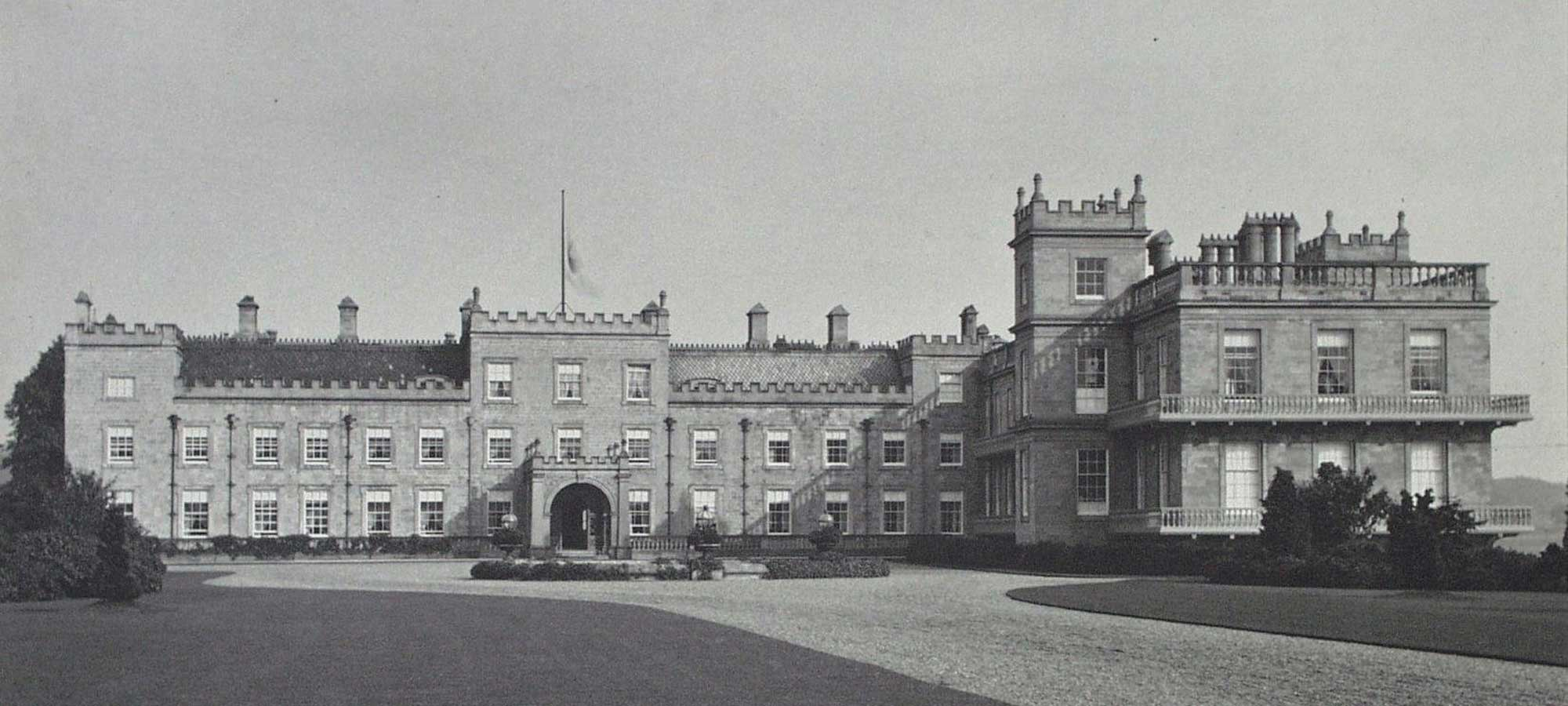
The west front of Welbeck Abbey was redecorated in a castellated style by the Dukes of Portland at the start of the 19th century

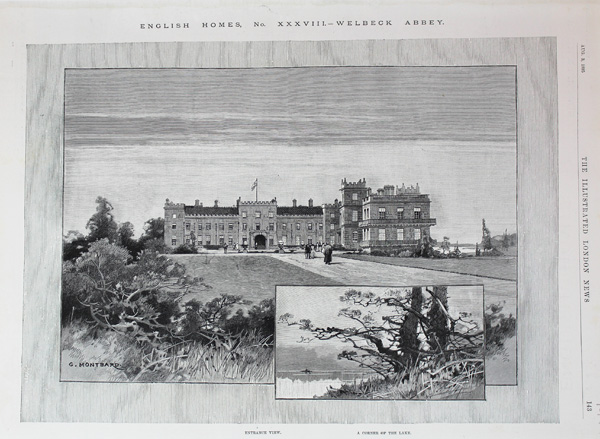
Welbeck Abbey in the London Illustrated News

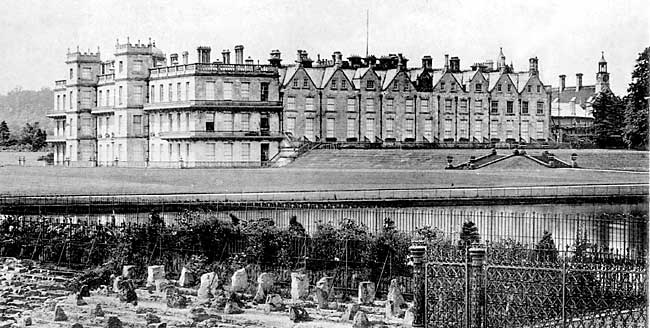
Welbeck Abbey as it appeared in the 19th century (1900)

=== 5th Duke of Portland and the Welbeck tunnels ===
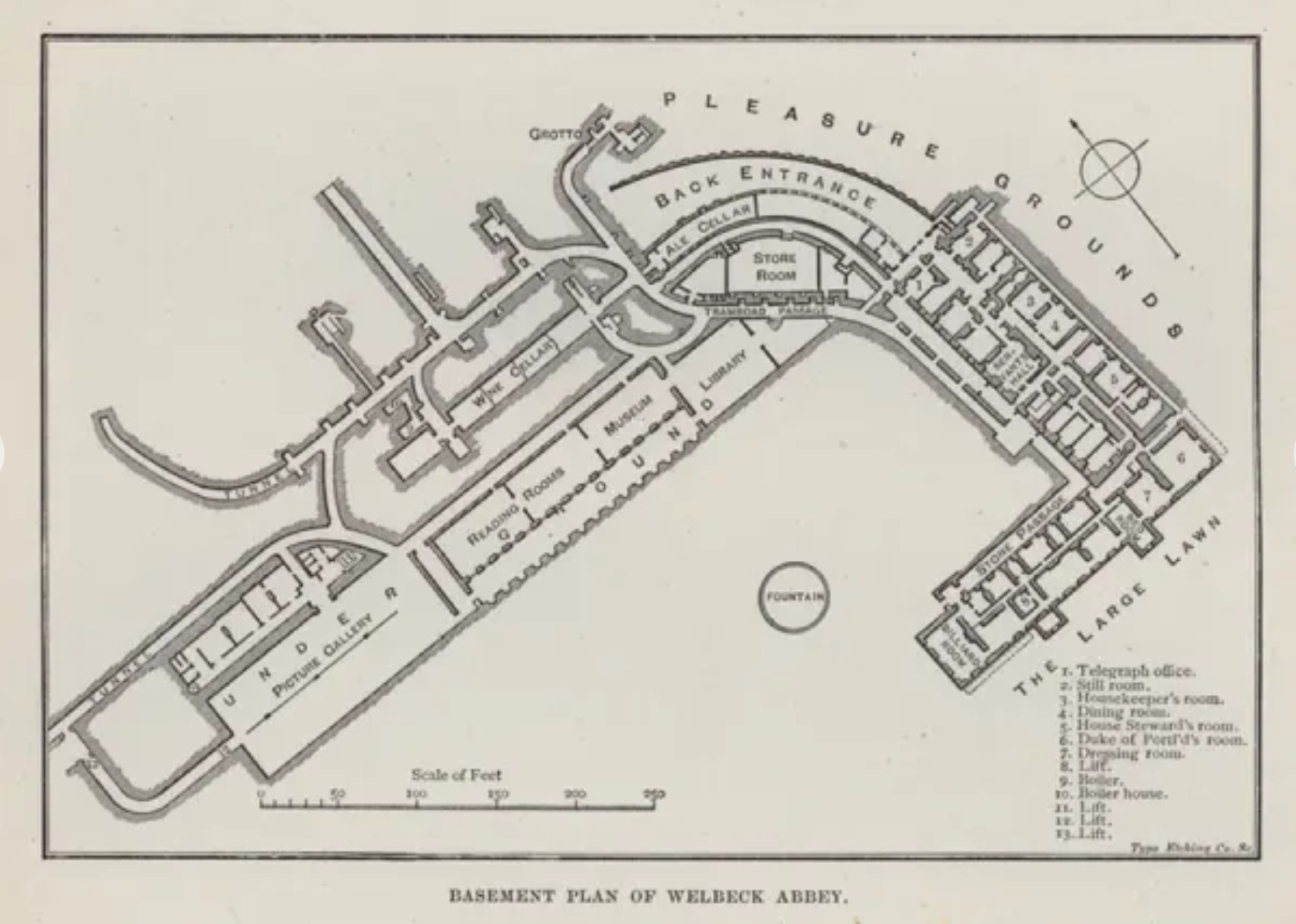
The basement plan of Welbeck Abbey shows the rooms and tunnels created by the 5th Duke of Portland

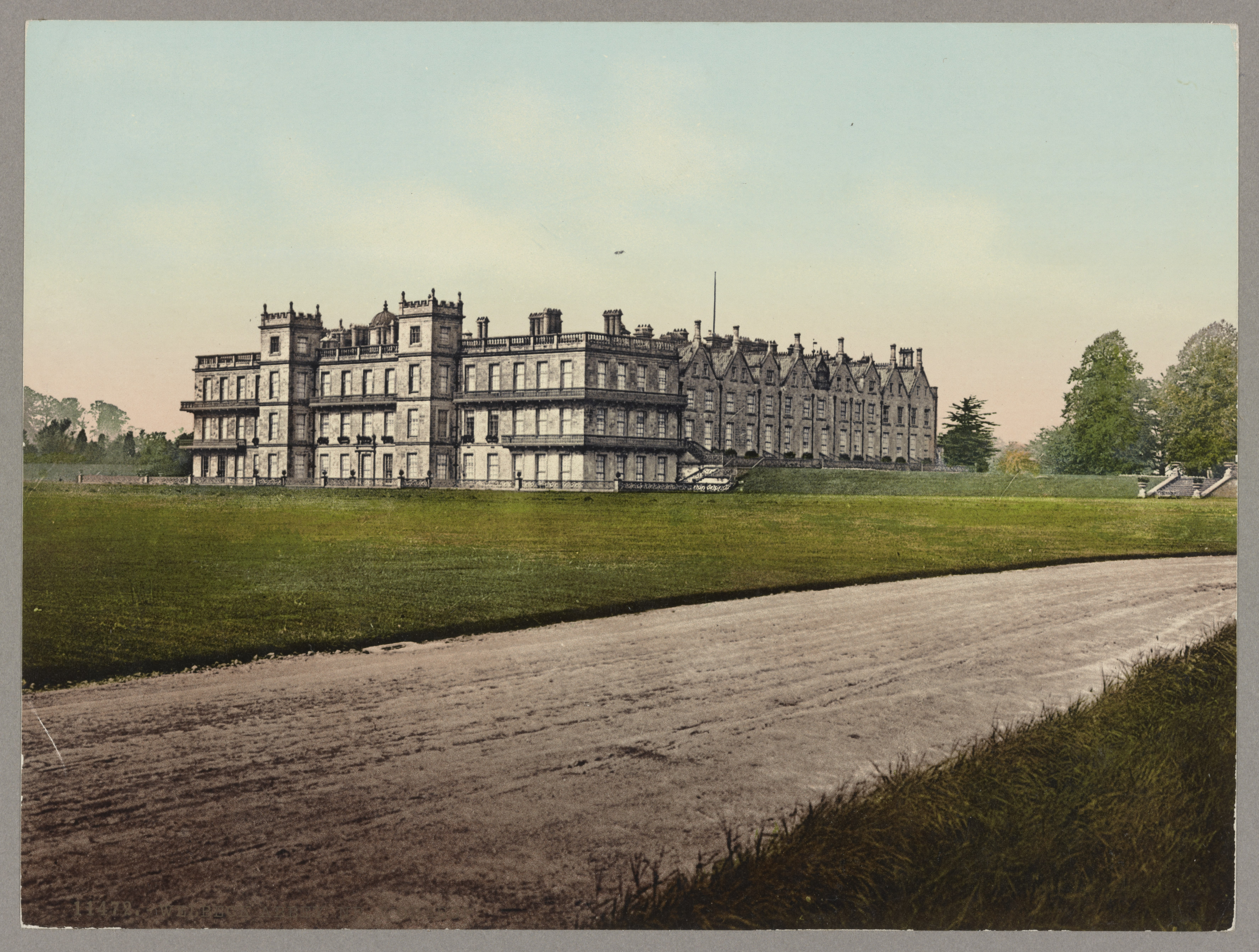
Welbeck Abbey (1890) before the fire destroyed the Oxford wing

The 5th Duke of Portland, who preferred to live in seclusion, had an elaborate underground maze excavated under his estate and undertook the most substantial building works at Welbeck. The kitchen gardens covered 22 acres (89,000 m^{2}) and were surrounded by high walls with recesses in which braziers could be placed to hasten the ripening of fruit. One of the walls, a peach wall, measured over 1,000 feet (300 m) in length. An immense riding house was built which was 396' long, 108' wide and 50' high. 'At the time it was the second largest riding house in the world, exceeded only by the huge Manege adjacent to the Kremlin in Moscow'. Nearby was a tan gallops of 422 yards (386 m). It was lit by 4,000 gas jets and was heated to enable training at night and in winter. The 'Tan Gallops' is named after the spongy oak chips that covered its floor. They were a by-product from leather tanning and a good surface for the horses to run on.

A tunnel, more than one thousand yards in length, led from the house to the riding school. It was wide enough for several people to walk side by side. Parallel to it was another, more roughly constructed and used by workmen. A longer, more elaborate tunnel, one and a half miles long, intended as a carriage drive broad enough for two carriages to pass, led towards Worksop. This tunnel was abandoned in the late 19th century when a section forming part of the lake dam failed. Remaining stretches of tunnel survive on either side of the lake. The tunnel's skylights can be seen from the Robin Hood Way footpath which follows its course and a masonry entrance can be seen between two lodges at the northeastern limit of the park.

The 5th Duke excavated to create a number of extensions to the mansion. Although cited as being "underground rooms", these apartments are strictly "below ground", as they are not covered by earth or lawn; their flat roofs and skylights are visible in aerial photographs, although at ground level they are concealed from most directions by shrubbery. The largest is a great hall, 160 feet (49 m) long and 63 feet (19 m) wide intended as a chapel but used as a picture gallery and occasionally as a ballroom. There is a suite of five adjacent rooms constructed to house the duke's library.

The duke made many alterations to the house above ground. Elaborate bathrooms were added. New lodges were built at the park entrances.

The work cost prodigious sums and employed thousands of men – masons, bricklayers, joiners, plumbers. While there were disputes from time to time (wages, hours) the duke got on well with his employees and earned the nickname 'the workman's friend'. He created employment for skilled and unskilled workers.

=== 6th Duke of Portland: remodelling and the Archduke's visit ===
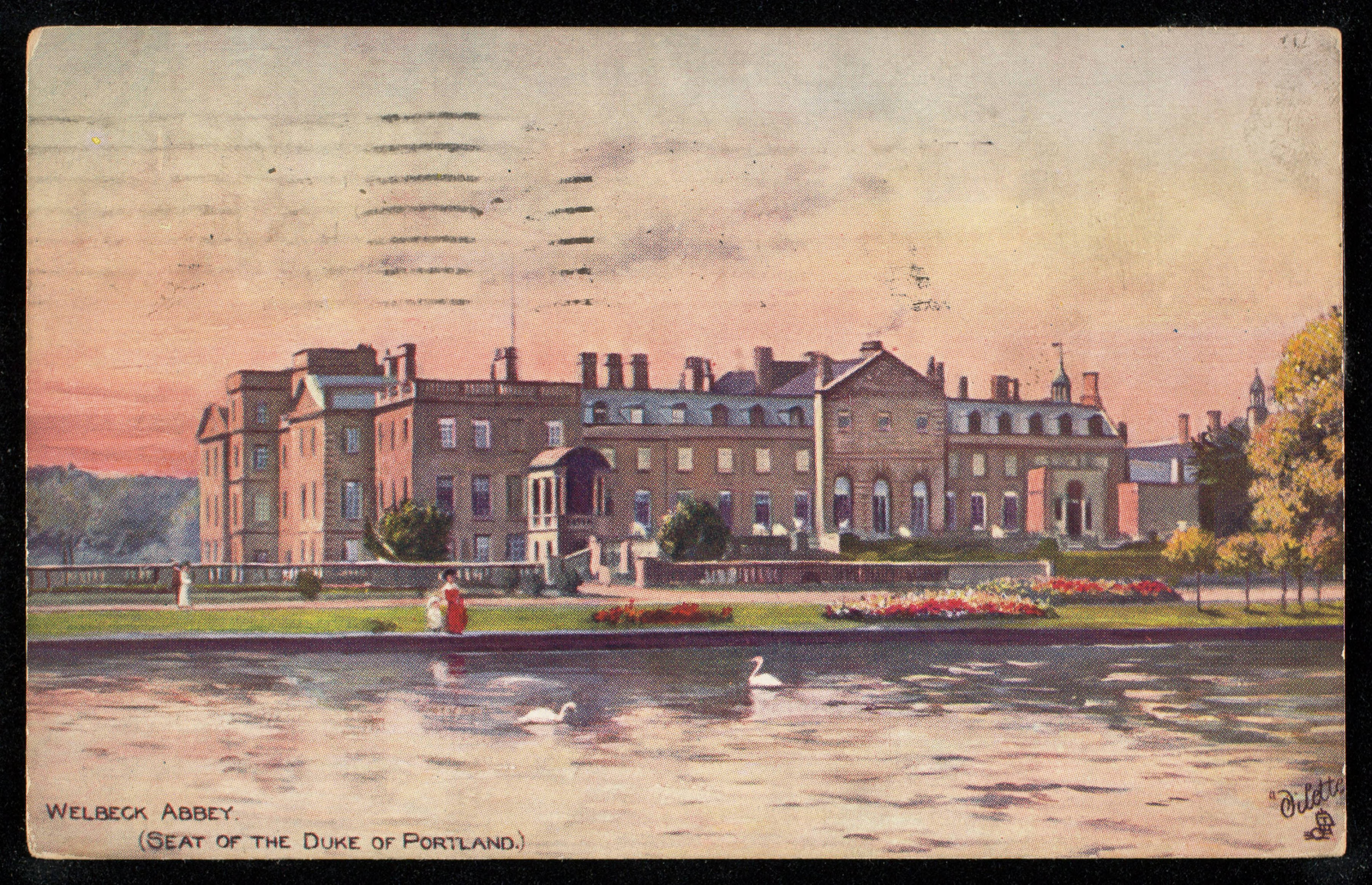
Welbeck Abbey after the Edwardian reconstruction

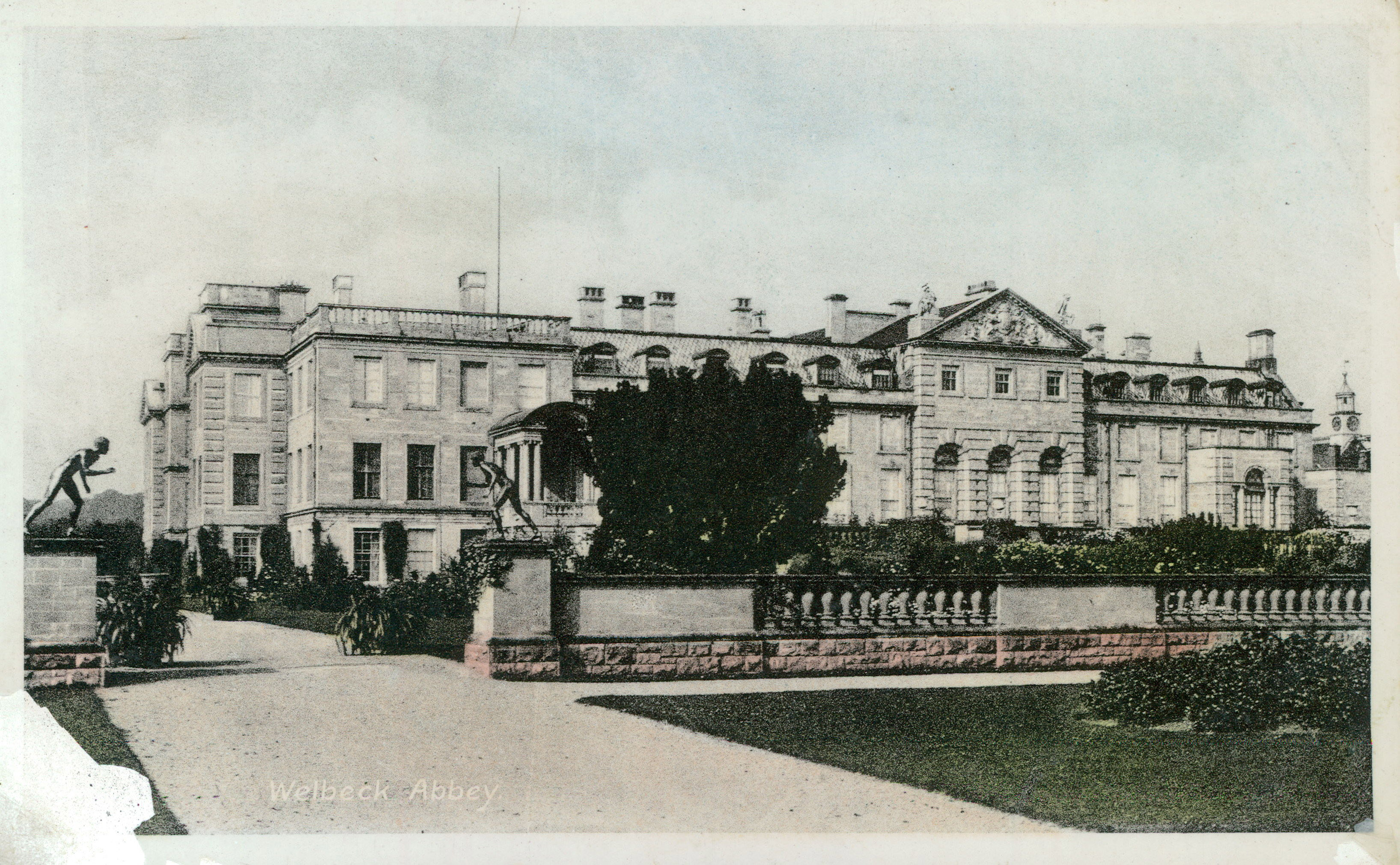
The east front

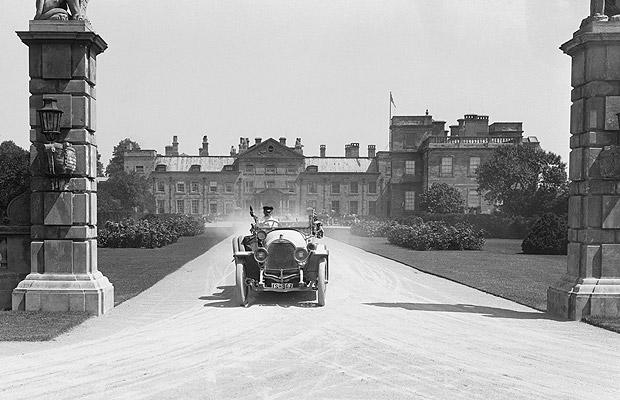
Welbeck Abbey in 1907

By 1879 Welbeck was in a state of disrepair. The only habitable rooms were the four or five rooms used by the 5th Duke in the west wing. All were painted pink, with parquet floors, all bare and without furniture and almost every room had a water closet in the corner.

The house was repaired by the 6th Duke, and became notable as a centre of late Victorian and Edwardian upper-class society. The duke was a keen horse-owner, and almhouses he constructed on the estate are known as the Winnings, funded by money won by his horses in seven high purse races from 1888 to 1890.

On 5 October 1900 a fire broke out in the top floor of one of the oldest parts of the house, the Oxford Wing, after a power failure and a neglected electric iron ignited a blaze in a nursery attic. Although the fire caused serious damage, much of the destruction resulted from the water used to extinguish it; nevertheless, the estate fire brigade and staff prevented the flames from spreading to the adjoining Old Wing and saved many valuable artworks and furnishings. The housekeeper, Mary Ann Marshall, was widely praised for her bravery in rescuing the Duke and Duchess’s three young children from the smoke-filled nursery, earning lasting gratitude from the family. In the aftermath, the 6th Duke of Portland commissioned Sir Ernest George to remodel and modernise the Oxford Wing, using the disaster as an opportunity to adapt the house to Edwardian tastes and contemporary patterns of social life. Though disruptive, the fire ultimately became the catalyst for significant architectural renewal at Welbeck.

Archduke Franz Ferdinand accepted an invitation from the 6th Duke of Portland to stay at Welbeck Abbey and arrived with his wife, Sophie von Hohenberg, by train at Worksop on 22 November 1913 ten months before his assassination, which triggered World War I. The Archduke narrowly avoided being killed in a hunting accident during his stay when a loader fell and caused a shotgun to go off within feet of the Archduke and his host.

==== Interior of Welbeck Abbey (1906) ====
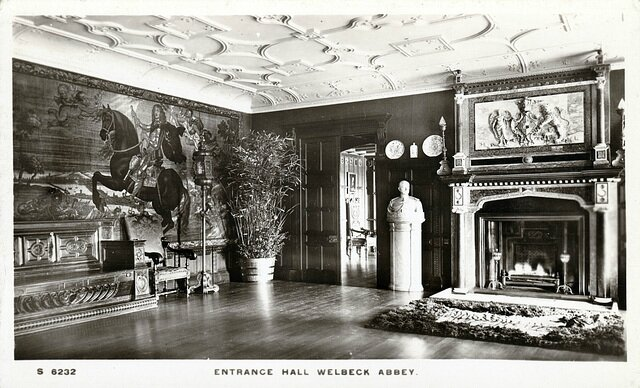
The entrance hall

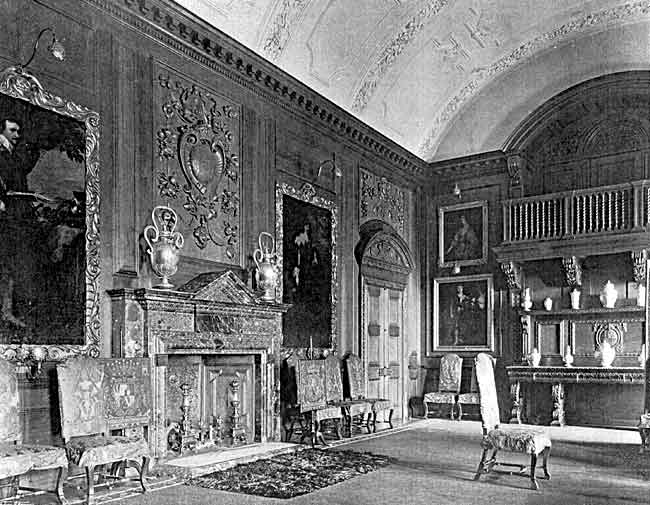
The dining room

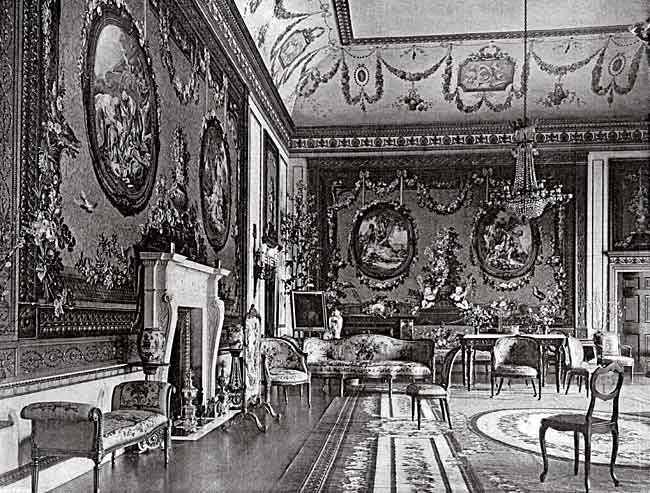
The Red Tapestry drawing room

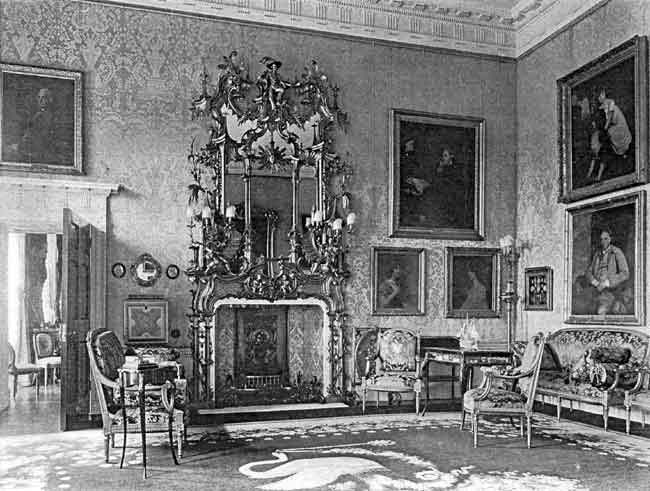
The Swan drawing room

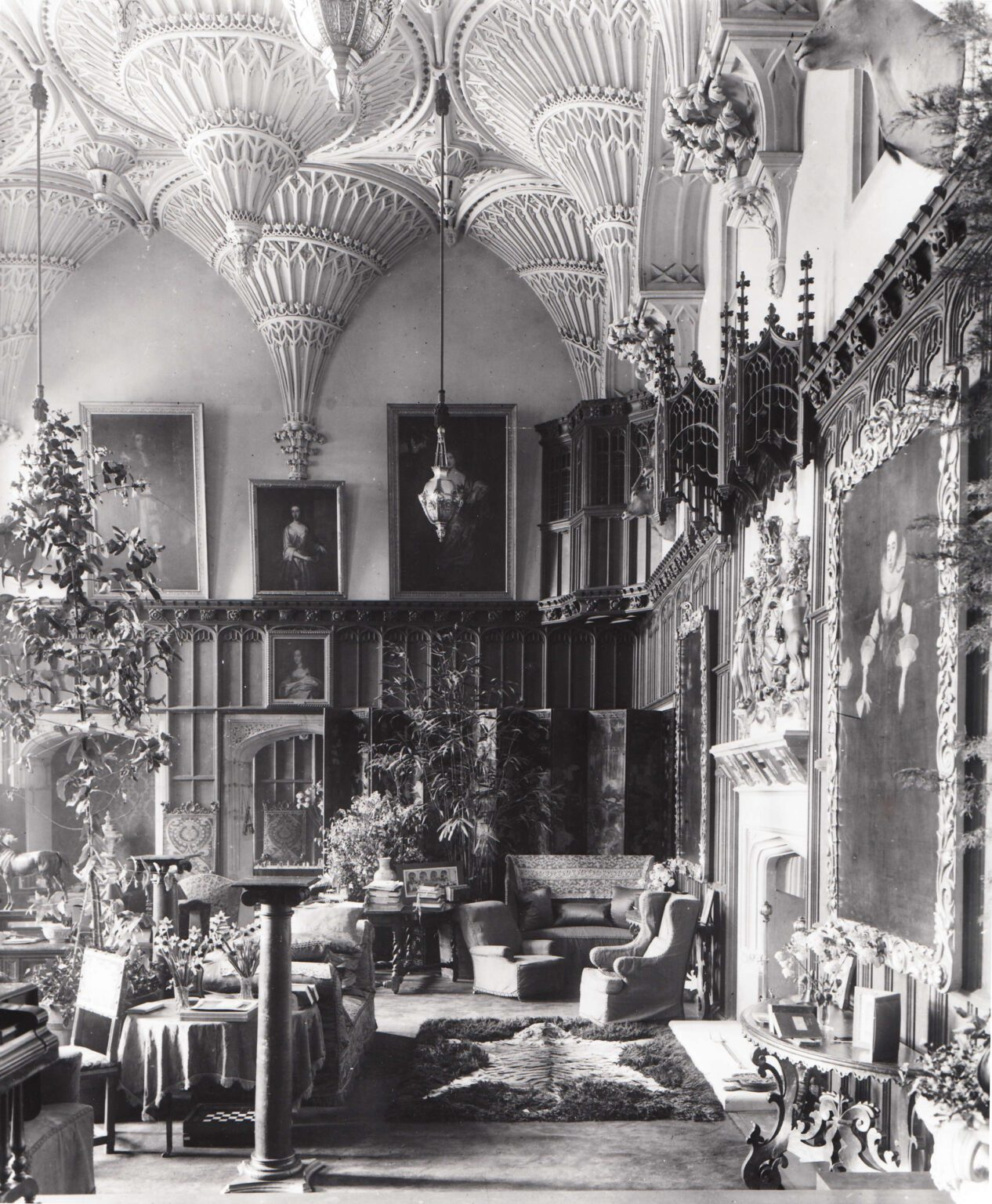
The Gothic hall

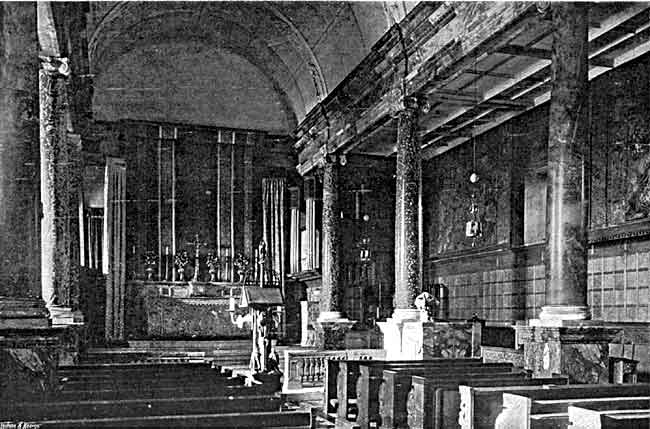
The chapel

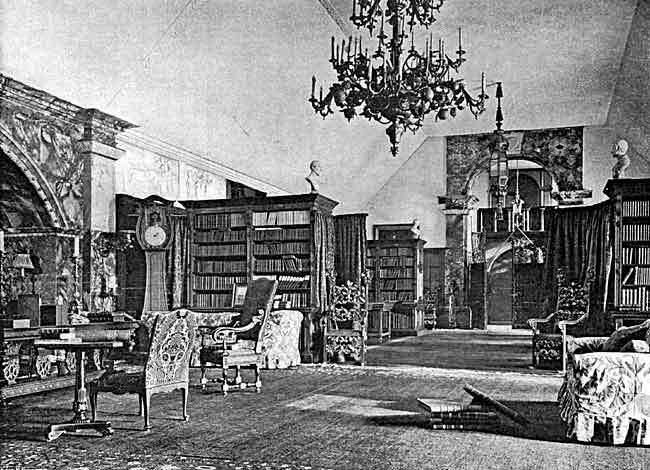
The Titchfield Library

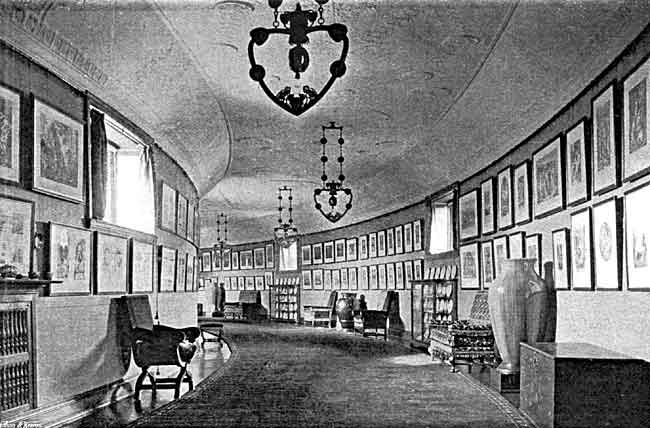
The gallery of prints

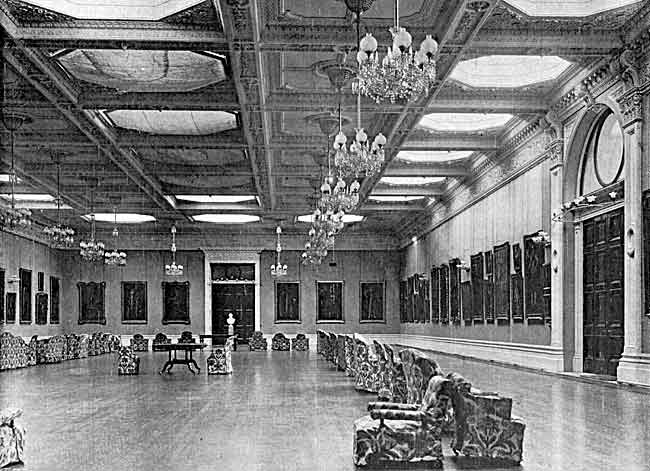
The great ball room in the tunnels

=== Wartime and Military Use ===
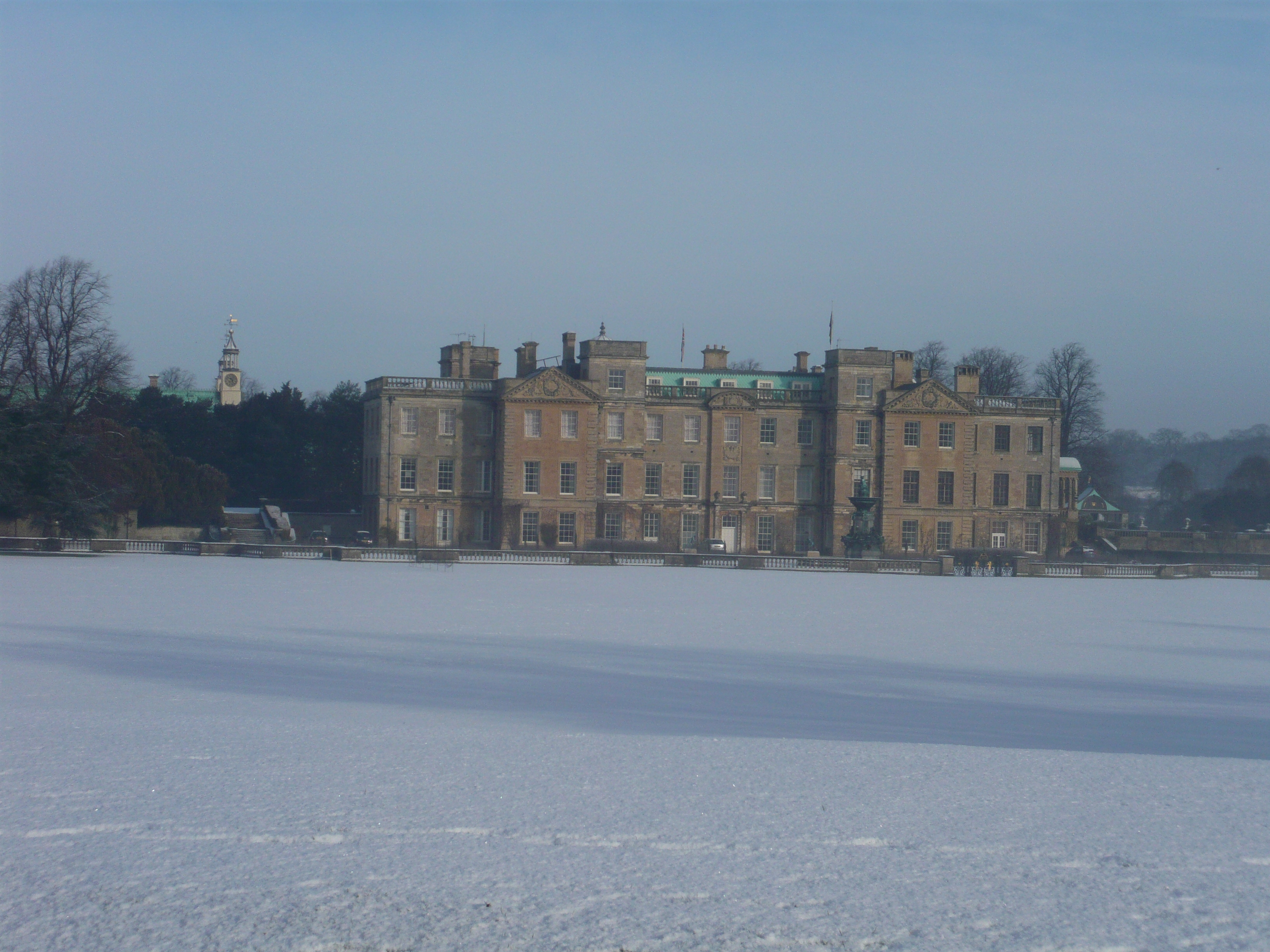
The renovated Oxford wing

Over the course of the War between 1914 and 1919, the kitchen block was used as an army hospital. During World War II, Welbeck was let by the Dukes to the Ministry of Defence. From 1953 Welbeck Defence Sixth Form College, formerly Welbeck College, provided A-level education for boys planning to join the technical branches of the British Army. In 2005, the school was relocated to a purpose-built site in Leicestershire. Bill Bryson describes his visit to the Abbey while it was occupied by the Ministry of Defence in Chapter 15 of his book Notes from a Small Island.

Lady Anne Cavendish-Bentinck, the unmarried elder daughter of the 7th Duke of Portland, lived at Welbeck Woodhouse, and owned most of the 17,000-acre (69 km^{2}) estate until her death in late 2008 when William Henry Marcello Parente (born 1951) inherited, son of her younger sister, Lady Margaret (1918–1955) and her husband Gaetano Parente, Prince of Castel Viscardo. Since the Ministry of Defence moved out in 2005, Welbeck Abbey has been his home. Lady Anne Cavendish-Bentinck was related to Queen Elizabeth II as they shared the same great great grandfather Lord Charles Bentinck.

== Architecture ==
The abbey, its attached picture gallery and the chapel and library are listed Grade I on the National Heritage List for England, and its surrounding landscaped park is listed Grade II on the Register of Historic Parks and Gardens.

The two pairs of lodges flanking the north and south drives respectively are each listed Grade II*. The grotto is listed Grade II as is the sunken garden and rose arbor. The Chapel and Titchfield Library are listed Grade I.

== Welbeck Woodhouse ==
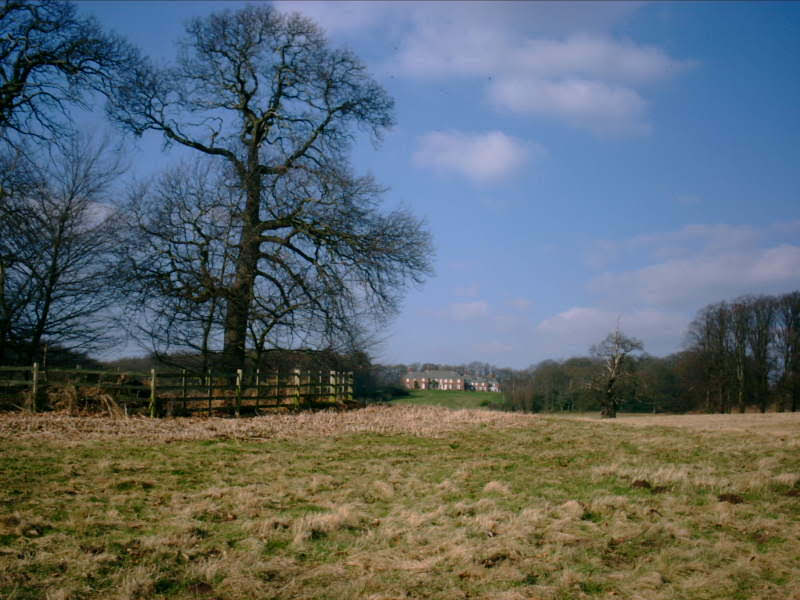
Welbeck Woodhouse seen from the park

A smaller house known as Welbeck Woodhouse was built on the northern side of the estate for the Marquess of Titchfield (the courtesy title held by the 7th Duke prior to his succession to the Dukedom) in 1930–31. This was built to a design by Walter Brierley but executed after Brierley's death by his partner James Hervey Rutherford. This house was subsequently the main home of the Cavendish-Bentinck family on the estate when the main house was leased to the MoD.

== The estate today and amenities ==
The family-controlled Welbeck Estates Company and the charitable Harley Foundation have converted some estate buildings to new uses, and there is access to them from the A60 road on the western side of the estate. They include the Dukeries Garden Centre in the estate glasshouses, the School of Artisan Food in the former Fire Stables, the Harley Gallery and Foundation and the Welbeck Farm shop in the former estate gasworks, and a range of craft workshops, designed by John Outram in a former kitchen garden. The nearby Portland Collection museum houses collected items by the Cavendish family. Pedestrian access across the Welbeck estate is confined to footpaths forming part of the Robin Hood Way.

In 2011 the then Prince of Wales and Duchess of Cornwall (Charles III and Queen Camilla) visited the Artisan School.

The first No Direction Home Festival was held at Welbeck Abbey over the weekend of 8 to 10 June 2012. The End of the Road affiliated festival was headlined by Richard Hawley, The Low Anthem and Andrew Bird.

In 2016 it was used as the location for the BBC's baking series Bake Off: Crème de la Crème.

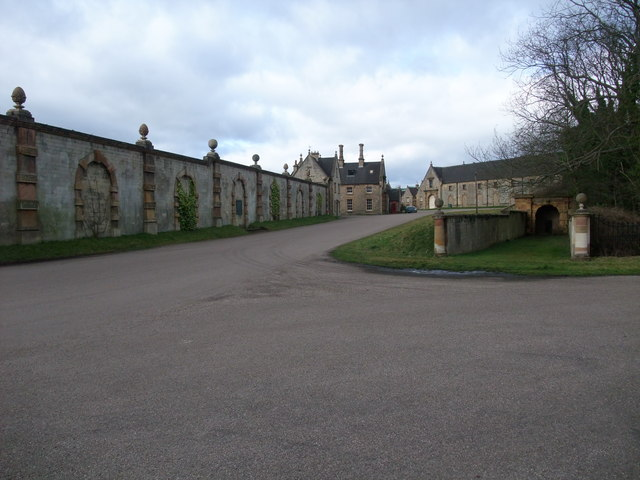
The estate buildings

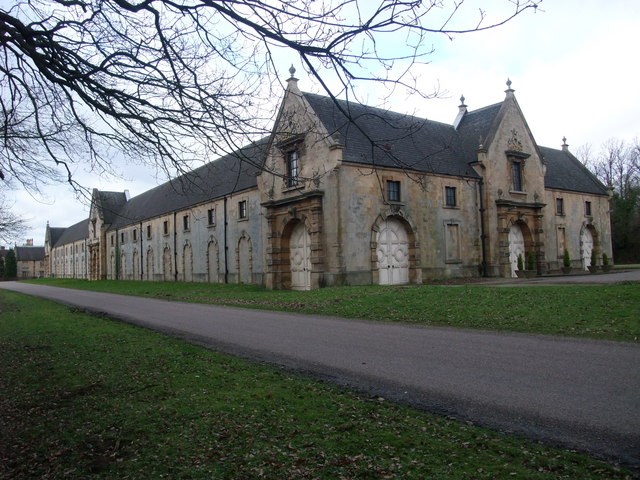
The new riding school at Welbeck Abbey

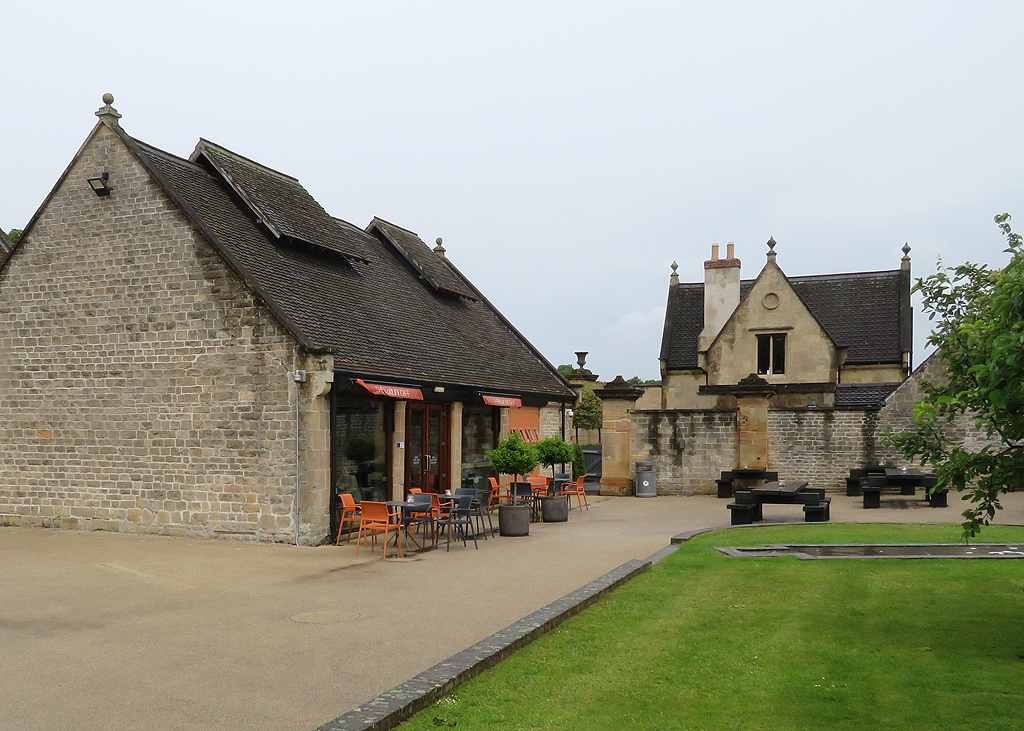
Harley Cafe

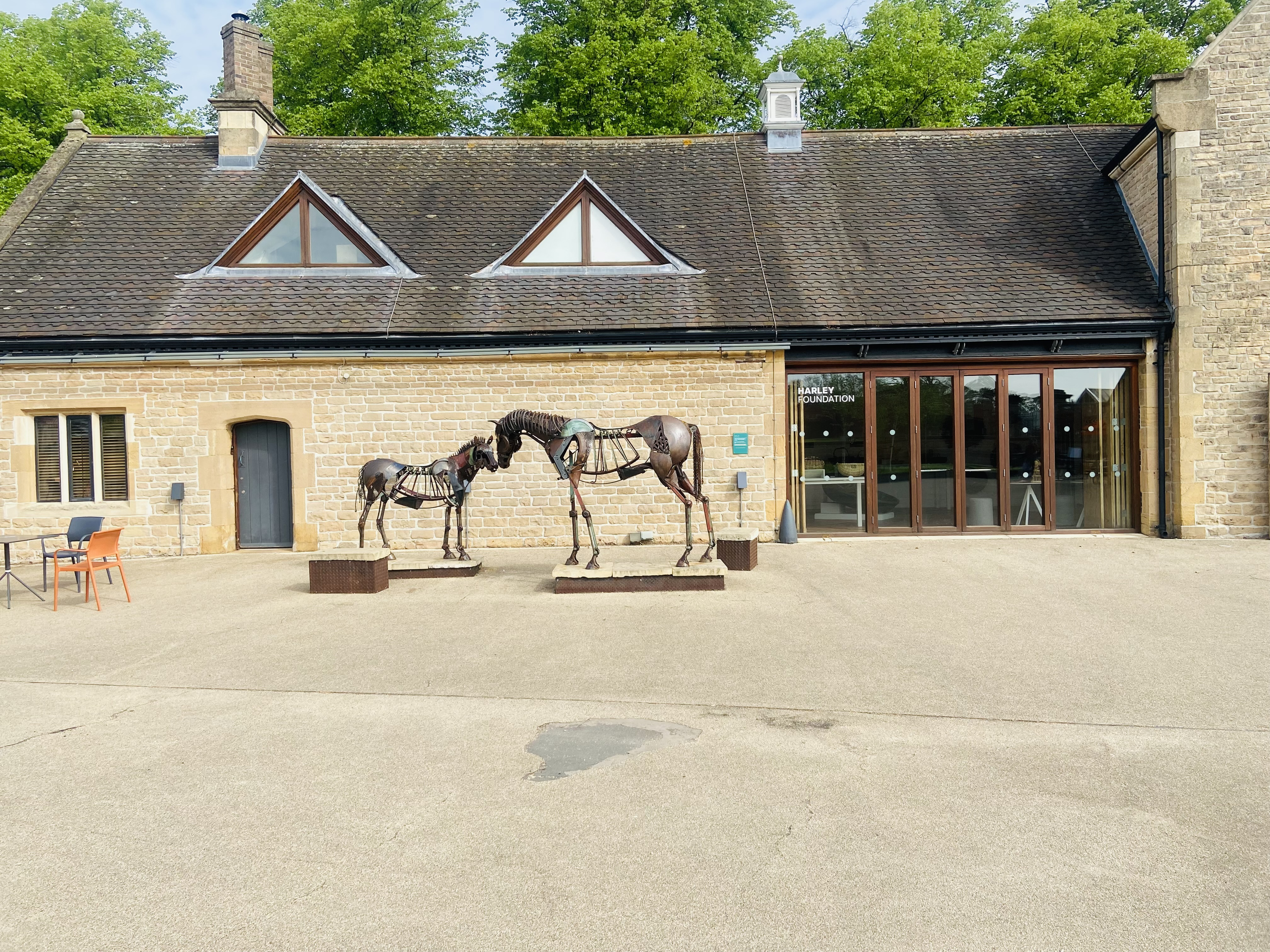
Harley Gallery

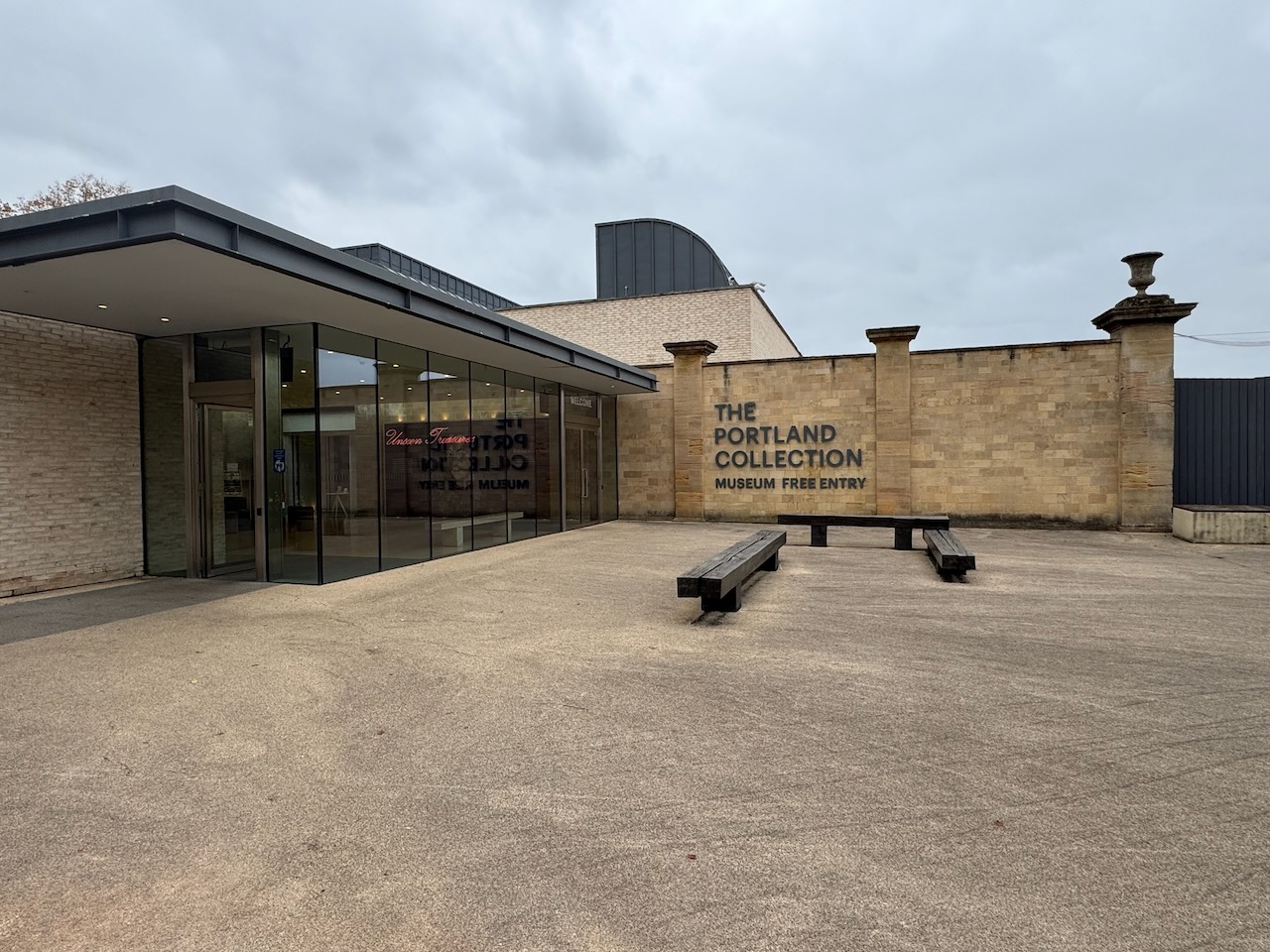
The Portland Collection Museum

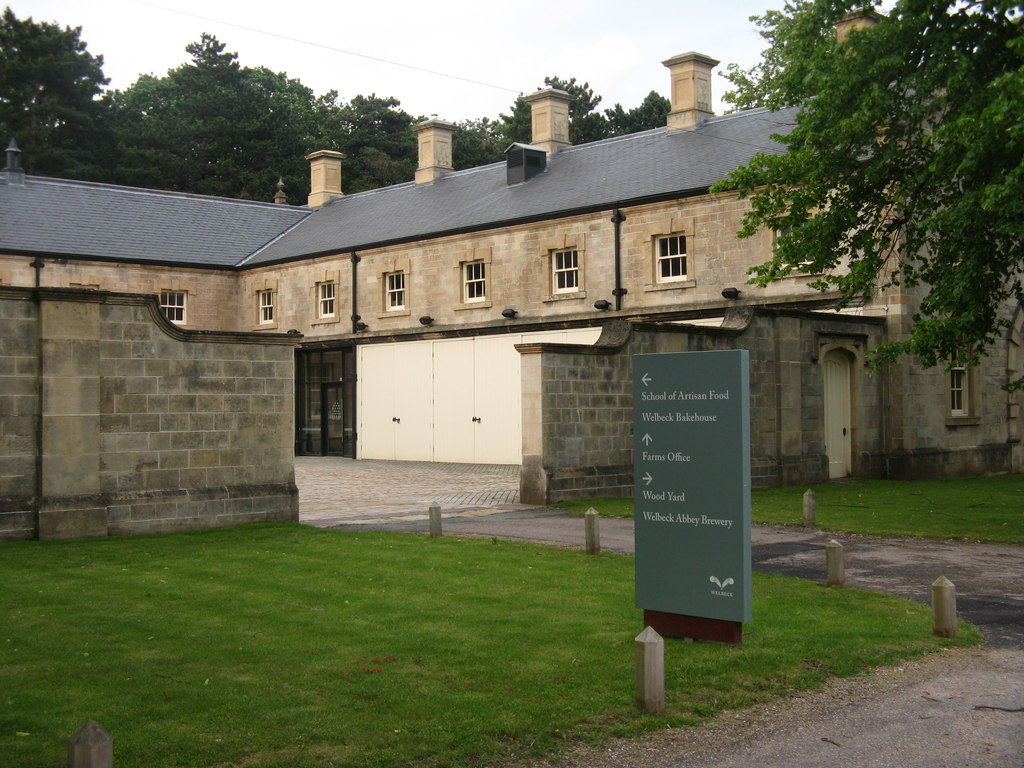
The School of Artisan Food

== List of owners and occupiers ==
- ca 1086 Hugh FitzBaldric
- 1140 – 1538 Premonstratensian canons in the Abbey of St. James

=== Abbots of Welbeck Abbey ===
- Berengar, occurs between 1153 and 1169
- Adam, occurs between 1183 and 1194
- Richard, occurs between 1194 and 1224
- William, occurs 1229, 1236, 1243
- Richard, occurs 1250, 1252, 1256–7
- Adam, occurs 1263, 1272, 1276
- Thomas, occurs 1281, 1292
- John de Duckmanton, 1309
- John de Cestrefeld, 1310
- William de Kendall, 1316
- John de Nottingham, 1322
- William de Aslakeden, 1335
- Robert Spalding, 1341
- John de Wirksop, 1349
- Hugh de Langley, 1360
- George de Gamelston, occurs 1369, 1383, 1387
- William de Staveley, occurs 1389
- John Bankwell, occurs 1393
- John de Norton, occurs 1412, dies 1450
- John Greene, 1450
- William Burton, occurs 1475, 1482
- John Lancaster alias Acastre, occurs 1488, 1491
- John Copper, occurs 1492
- Thomas Wydur, occurs 1494, 1497, 1500
- Robert, occurs 1502
- Thomas Wilkinson, 1503
- John Maxey, 1520, died 1536
- Richard Bentley, surrendered 1538

=== Private owners ===
- 1538 – 1558 Richard Whalley of Screveton
- 1558 – 1595 Edward Osborne of London, citizen and clothworker
- 1595 – 1599 Robert Booth and Ranulph Catterall
- 1599 – 1607 Gilbert Talbot, 7th Earl of Shrewsbury and Mary Talbot, Countess of Shrewsbury
- 1607 – 1617 Sir Charles Cavendish
- 1617 – 1676 William Cavendish, 1st Duke of Newcastle
- 1676 – 1691 Henry Cavendish, 2nd Duke of Newcastle-upon-Tyne
- 1691 – 1711 John Holles, 1st Duke of Newcastle-upon-Tyne and Lady Margaret Cavendish
- 1711 – 1734 Edward Harley, 2nd Earl of Oxford and Earl Mortimer and Lady Henrietta Cavendish Holles
- 1734 – 1785 William Bentinck, 2nd Duke of Portland and Margaret Bentinck, Duchess of Portland
- 1785 – 1809 William Cavendish-Bentinck, 3rd Duke of Portland
- 1809 – 1854 William Bentinck, 4th Duke of Portland
- 1854 – 1879 William Cavendish-Scott-Bentinck, 5th Duke of Portland
- 1879 – 1943 William John Arthur Charles James Cavendish-Bentinck, 6th Duke of Portland
- 1943 – 1977 William Arthur Henry Cavendish-Bentinck, 7th Duke of Portland and Ivy Cavendish-Bentinck, Duchess of Portland
  - 1943 – 2005 The Ministry of Defence leased most of the abbey from the 7th Duke and his successors
- 1977 – 2008 Lady Anne Cavendish-Bentinck
- 1992 – present William Parente, a grandson of the 7th Duke and a nephew of Lady Anne; he served as High Sheriff of Nottinghamshire for 2003–2004. He is Prince of Castel Viscardo in Italy.

== See also ==
- Grade I listed buildings in Nottinghamshire
- Listed buildings in Welbeck

== Literature ==
- Turberville, Arthur Stanley (1938). A history of Welbeck Abbey and its owners – Volume 1: 1538-1755. London: Faber and Faber.
- Turberville, Arthur Stanley (1939). A history of Welbeck Abbey and its owners – Volume 2: 1755-1879. London: Faber and Faber.
- Smith, Peter (2001). "Lady Oxford's alterations at Welbeck Abbey 1741-55" (PDF). The Georgian Group. XI: 133–168.
