= The School of Artisan Food =

Cooking school in Nottinghamshire, England

- Type: Charity
- Founded: 2009
- Headquarters: Welbeck Estate, Nottinghamshire, United Kingdom
- Key people: Alison Swan Parente (founder)
- Website: schoolofartisanfood.org

The School of Artisan Food is a cooking school sited on the Welbeck Estate in Nottinghamshire, England. Founded in 2009 by Alison Swan Parente, the school aims to teach the 'lost skills' of artisan food production.

== History ==
The School was founded in 2009 by William and Alison Swan Parente as the UK's first artisan food school, and opened that October. The couple had founded the Welbeck Bakehouse the previous year but, upon finding that there was a lack of skilled artisan bakers to supply it, decided to establish a school to provide education and training in artisan food production.

The school is located at a Grade II listed former fire station dating back to the 1850s at the Welbeck Estate. The School's facilities include three purpose-built training rooms, a resource room and a demonstration theatre. The school focused first on fermented foods like cheese, beer, bread and charcuterie.

The first students graduated from the School's Advanced Diploma in Artisan Baking in 2011, which is now a six-month course equivalent to foundation degree level. About 2000 students enrolled in 2015.

The School hosts the annual 'Food for Thought' festival each summer with lectures from food writers, business owners and educators. The School won the Cookery School of the Year award for 2014-15 and the Countryside Alliance Clarissa Dixon Wright Award in 2017 for outstanding contribution to food and education.

It was featured on the BBC radio The Food Programme on 26 April 2010.

In 2018 the School launched a foundation degree course, Artisan Food Production FdSc, in partnership with Nottingham Trent University, taught jointly by both institutions. The first course will be taught in October 2019.

In August 2018 the School launched a range of handmade artisan meats in collaboration with Delilah Delicatessens sold in Nottingham and Leicester.

== Courses ==
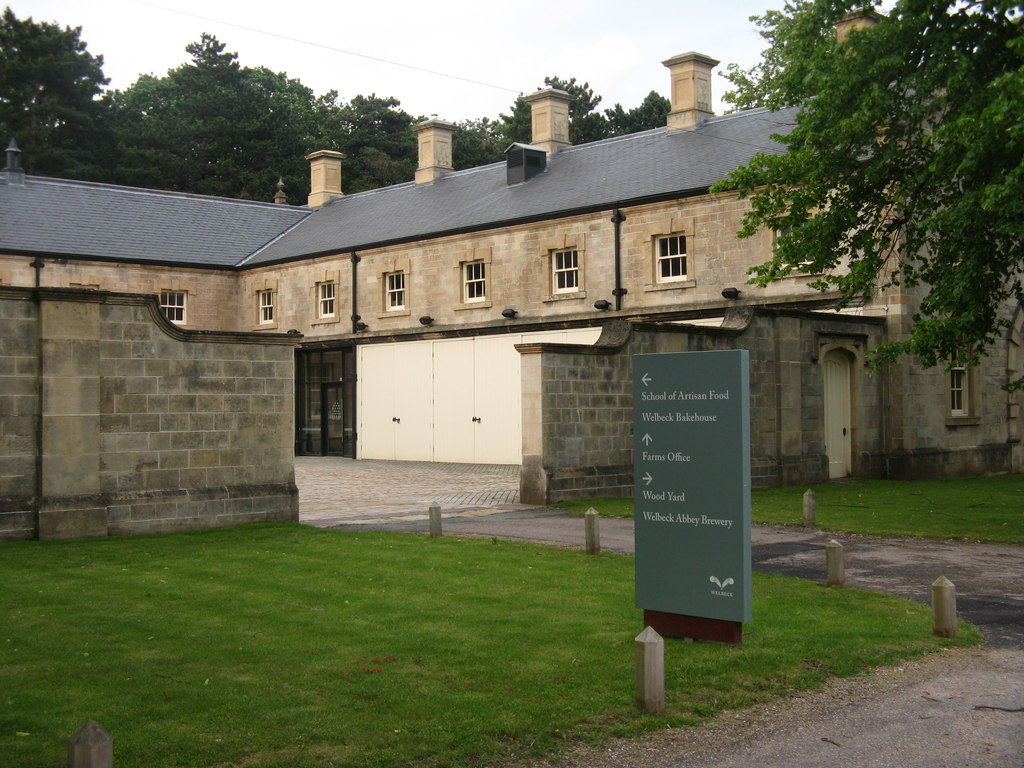
The School of Artisan Food

The School's courses cover a range of food production skills including butchery, bakery, cooking, cheesemaking and patisserie.

The School's cheesemaking courses have been claimed by The Guardian to have "helped to transform the British industry".

Courses range in length from half a day to six months and also include courses to teach students how to set up their own food businesses. Seasonal courses, such as Christmas-themed classes, Mother's Day and Father's day courses, are also available. The school's "Pig in a Day" is a crash course in butchery.

The School attracts students from a variety of backgrounds, from middle-aged people looking to change career path, to hobbyists, to children, to international students who come for long-term residential courses.
