= Lord Algernon Gordon-Lennox =

British Army colonel

- Born: 19 September 1847; Goodwood House, Sussex, England
- Died: 3 October 1921 (aged 74); Capri, Italy
- Spouse: Blanche Maynard (m. 1886)
- Children: Ivy Cavendish-Bentinck, Duchess of Portland
- Relatives: Charles Gordon-Lennox (brother)
- Military career
- Service: Royal Navy
- Rank: Colonel
- Units: 1st Life Guards; Grenadier Guards
- Wars: Anglo-Egyptian War; Second Boer War

Colonel Lord Algernon Charles Gordon-Lennox (19 September 1847 – 3 October 1921) was a British aristocrat and military officer.

== Life ==
Gordon-Lennox was educated at Eton. He served in the Royal Navy between 1862 and 1865. In 1867, he joined 1st Life Guards and, in 1867, transferred to Grenadier Guards. He served with 2nd Battalion Grenadier Guards in Anglo-Egyptian War in 1882. He was the Aide-de-Camp to Prince George, Duke of Cambridge, 1883–95. He served in South Africa in 1900 as Military Secretary to Sir Alfred Milner, and latterly on the staff of Hugh Trenchard, 1st Viscount Trenchard.

== Family ==
Gordon-Lennox was born to Charles Gordon-Lennox, 6th Duke of Richmond and Frances Harriett Greville, daughter of Algernon Greville.

He married Blanche Maynard, daughter of Charles Henry Maynard and Blanche Fitzroy. Blanche's paternal grandfather was Henry Maynard, 3rd Viscount Maynard and her stepfather was Robert St Clair-Erskine, 4th Earl of Rosslyn. Blanche Gordon-Lennox would later be appointed Dame Commander of the Order of the British Empire (DBE) in 1919.

The couple had one child: Ivy Cavendish-Bentinck, Duchess of Portland.
