= David Maclagan =

Scottish medical doctor and military surgeon

David MacLagan MD, FRSE
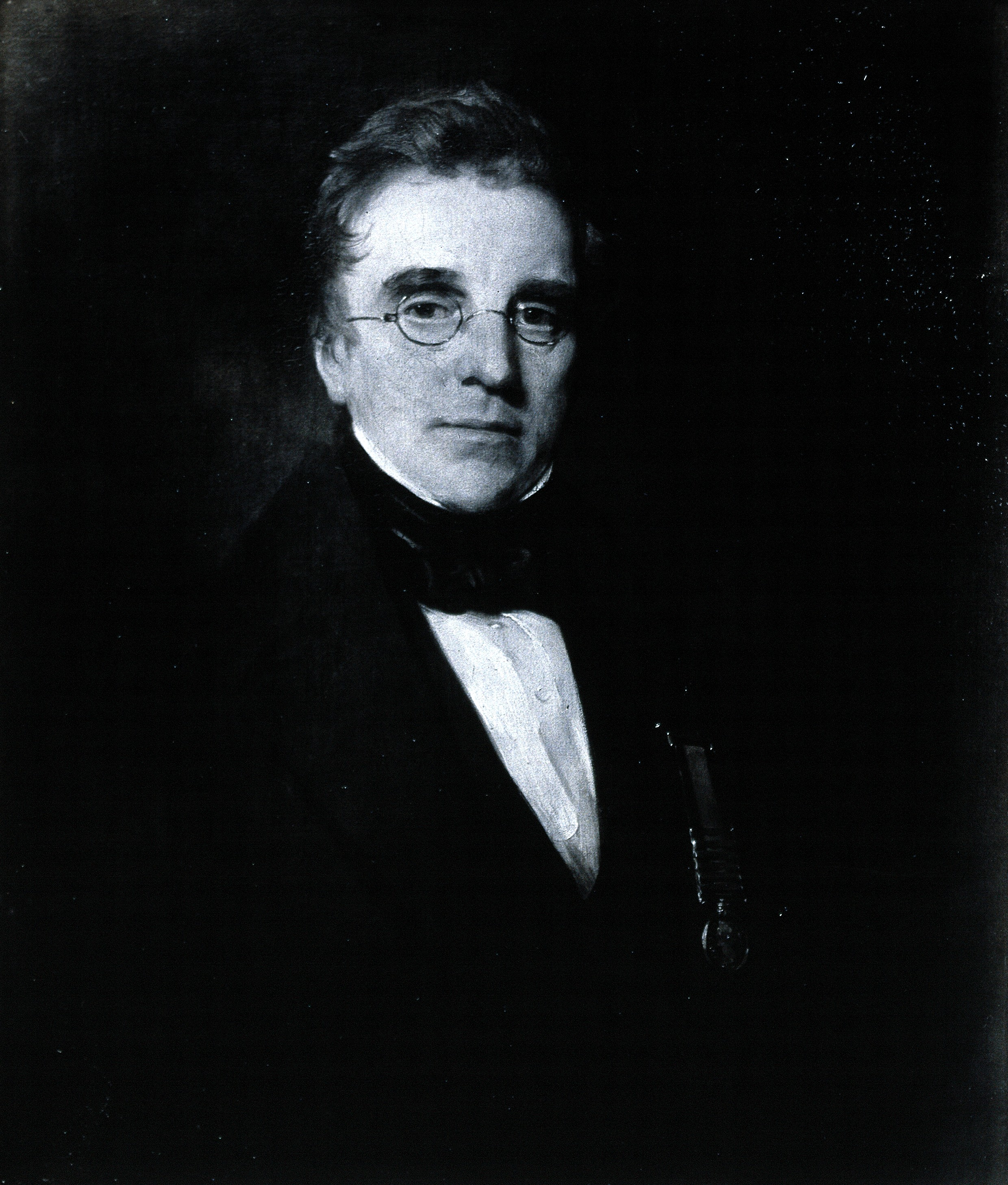
- David Maclagan, shown wearing his Peninsular War Campaign Medal with six clasps
- Born: 8 February 1785; Edinburgh, Scotland
- Died: 6 June 1865 (aged 80); Edinburgh, Scotland
- Education: University of Edinburgh
- Occupations: Surgeon and physician
- Known for: Presidency of two medical Royal Colleges

David Maclagan MD, FRSE, FRCSEd, FRCPE (8 February 1785 – 6 June 1865) was a prominent Scottish medical doctor and military surgeon, serving in the Napoleonic Wars. He served as President of both the Royal College of Physicians of Edinburgh and the Royal College of Surgeons of Edinburgh. He was Surgeon in Scotland to Queen Victoria.

== Early life ==
Maclagan was born in Edinburgh on 8 February 1785, the son of Robert MacClaggan (d.1785), surgeon, and Margaret Smeiton, his second wife. His father changed his name to Maclagan some time before David was born, to disassociate himself from various Jacobite connections. Maclagan trained as a doctor and surgeon at the University of Edinburgh, graduating with an MD in 1805. Too young to join the army as a surgeon, he travelled to London and studied and practiced at St George's Hospital. He was admitted as a member the Royal College of Surgeons (MRCS) in 1807.

== Military service in the Peninsular War ==
From 1808 he served as an assistant surgeon with the 91st Regiment of Foot, serving during the Walcheren Campaign of the Napoleonic Wars. This action saw not only a large number of injuries but many soldiers dying from or invalided out with malaria. In 1811 he was appointed surgeon-major and began his service in the Peninsular War, serving with the 9th Portuguese Brigade until 1814. During this time he was promoted Physician to the Forces, before being appointed Assistant Inspector of Hospitals. His active service during this period included the attack on Badajos, the Battle of Salamanca, the Battle of Vittoria, the Battle of the Pyrenees, the Battle of Nivelle and the Battle of Nive. For this service he was awarded the Peninsular War medal with six clasps.

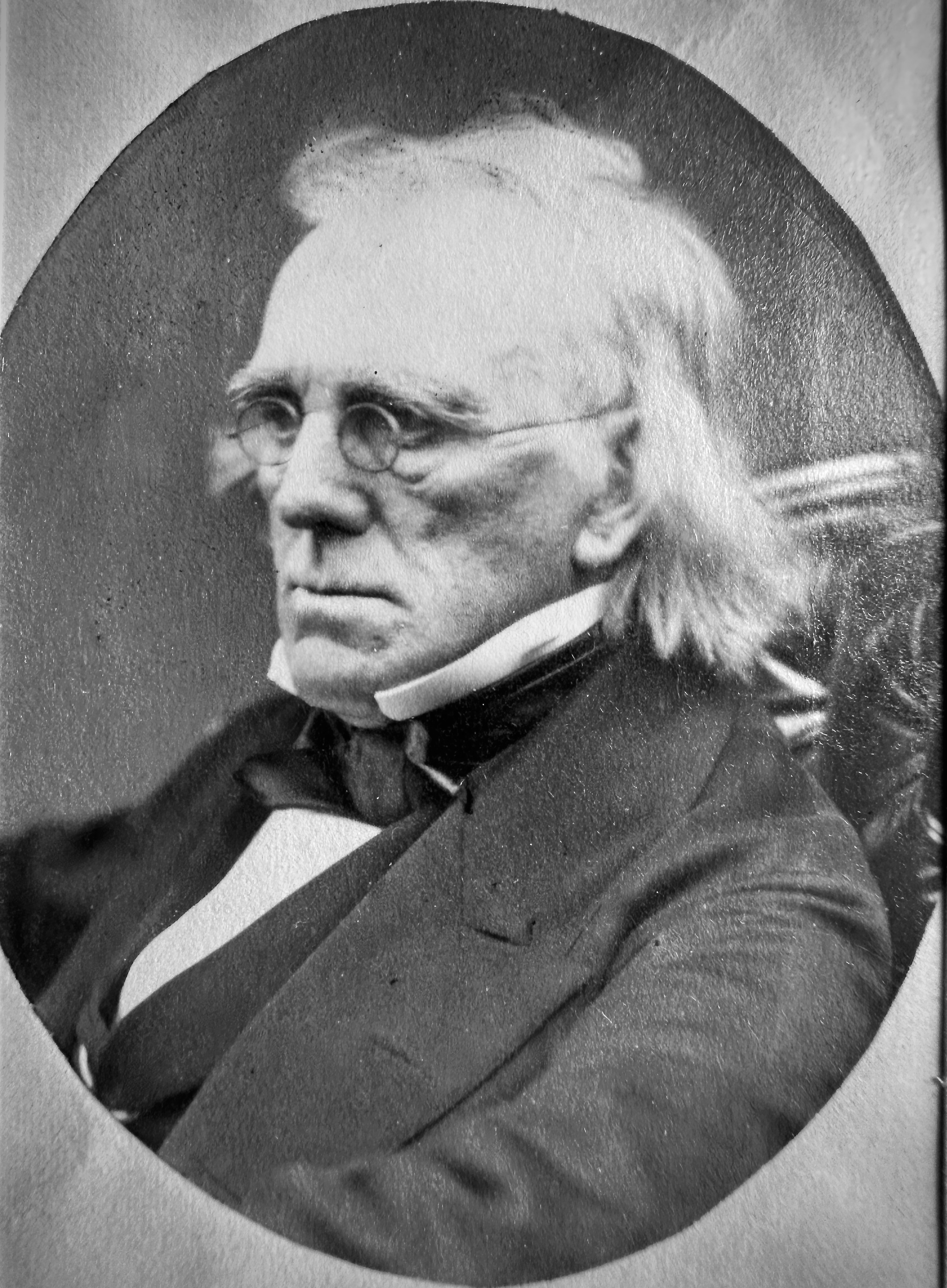
Maclagan in later life

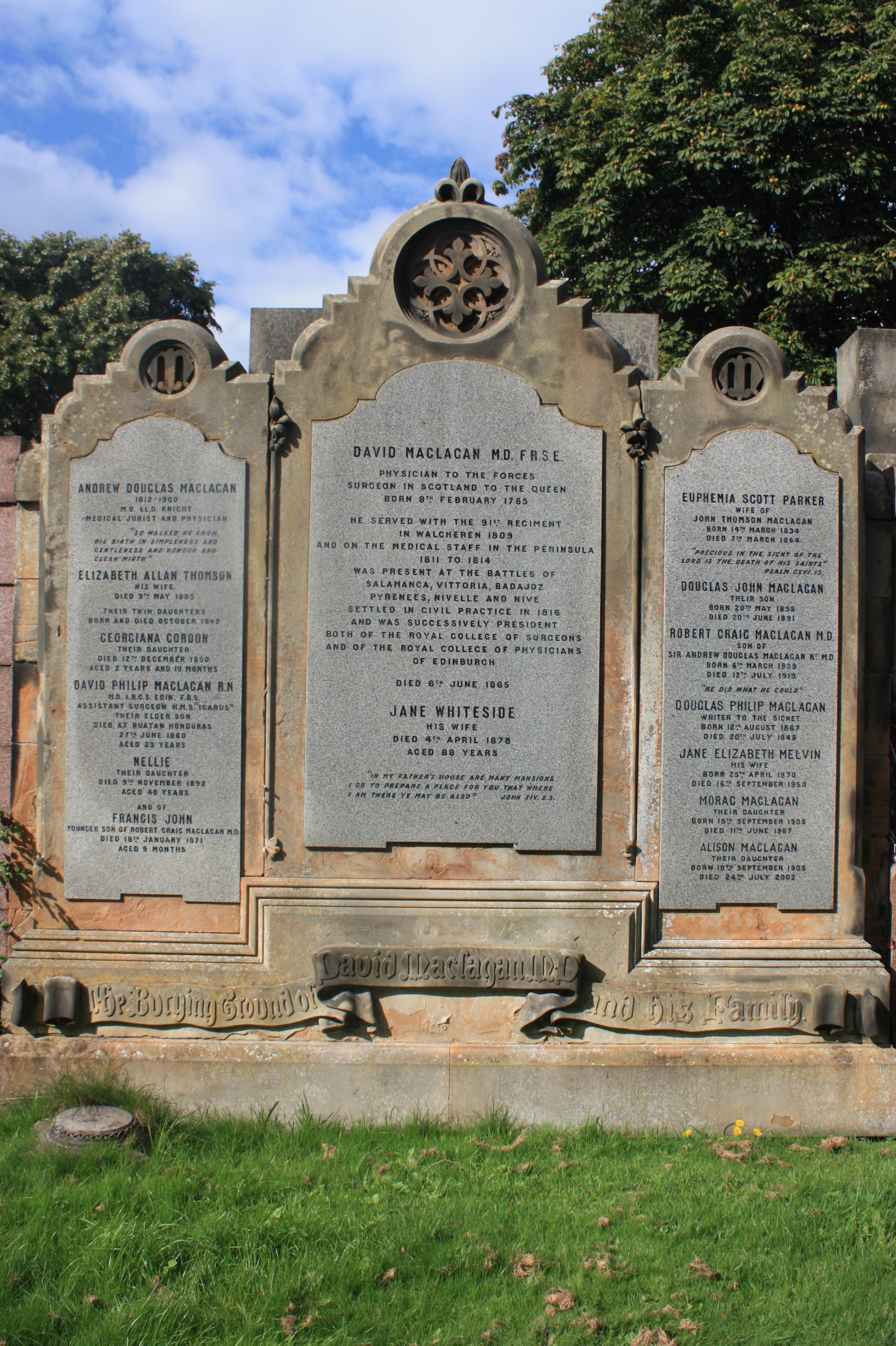
David Maclagan's grave, Dean Cemetery, Edinburgh

== Subsequent career ==
Returning to Britain in 1815 he was elected a Fellow of the Royal College of Surgeons of Edinburgh the following year and began surgical practice in Edinburgh. He was also appointed surgeon to the New Town Dispensary on Thistle Street, joining his friend John Thomson, one of the founders of the Dispensary, who was the first Professor of Military Surgery at the University of Edinburgh. When Thomson resigned the professorship in 1822, Maclagan applied for the Regius Chair of Military Surgery at the university and with his extensive experience of military surgery in the Peninsular War, was a strong candidate. He was, however, unsuccessful, the appointment going to George Ballingall.

Maclagan continued in private surgical practice and with his work at the New Town Dispensary until 1848. In that year, aged 63, he retired from surgery to become a physician and was elected a Fellow of the Royal College of Physicians of Edinburgh.

He was elected a Fellow of the Royal Society of Edinburgh in 1828, proposed by Sir John Robison. In 1828 he was also elected a member of the Aesculapian Club. In 1829 Maclagan was elected a member of the Harveian Society of Edinburgh and served as President in 1833.

He died at his home, 129 George Street, in Edinburgh on 6 June 1865. He is buried in Dean Cemetery, Edinburgh. The substantial grave lies against the north wall of the original cemetery (backing onto the northern extension). His wife and many of his children and grandchildren are buried with him.

== Positions of note ==
MacLagan held a number of notable positions and had the unusual distinction of serving as president of both the Royal College of Surgeons and the Royal College of Physicians of Edinburgh.

- President of the Royal College of Surgeons of Edinburgh 1826
- Fellow of the Society of Antiquaries of Scotland 1826
- President of the Harveian Society of Edinburgh 1833
- President of the Edinburgh Medico-Chirurgical Society 1840
- President of the Royal Scottish Society of Arts 1846-47
- President of the Royal College of Physicians of Edinburgh 1856-1858
- Deacon, Edinburgh Town Council (ex officio as president of the RCSEd)
- Surgeon to the Queen in Scotland

== Family ==
With his wife, Jane Whiteside (1790–1878), Maclagan had seven sons, most of whom went on to have distinguished careers in their own right. These were:

- Sir Andrew Douglas Maclagan FRSE LLD (1812–1900), physician and toxicologist
- Philip Whiteside Maclagan MD (1818–1892), physician
- General Sir Robert Maclagan FRSE (1820–1893), soldier and engineer
- David Maclagan FRSE (1824–1883), manager of the Edinburgh Life Insurance Company (also buried in Dean Cemetery)
- William Dalrymple Maclagan (1826–1910), Archbishop of York
- John Thompson Maclagan (1828–1897)
- James McGrigor Maclagan MD (1830–1892)

His grandchildren included:

- Robert Craig Maclagan FRSE (1839–1919), physician and anthropologist
- Sir Eric Robert Dalrymple Maclagan FSA (1879–1951), art historian
- Rev Canon David Whiteside Maclagan
- Philip Douglas MacLagan (1901–1972), painter, son of Philip Whiteside Maclagan

His great grandchildren include:

- Michael Maclagan (1914–2003), historian

== See also ==
- Works by or about Sir David Maclagan at the Internet Archive
