= Robert Maclagan =

Scottish military engineer (1820–1894)

General Sir Robert Maclagan KCMG FRSE FRGS
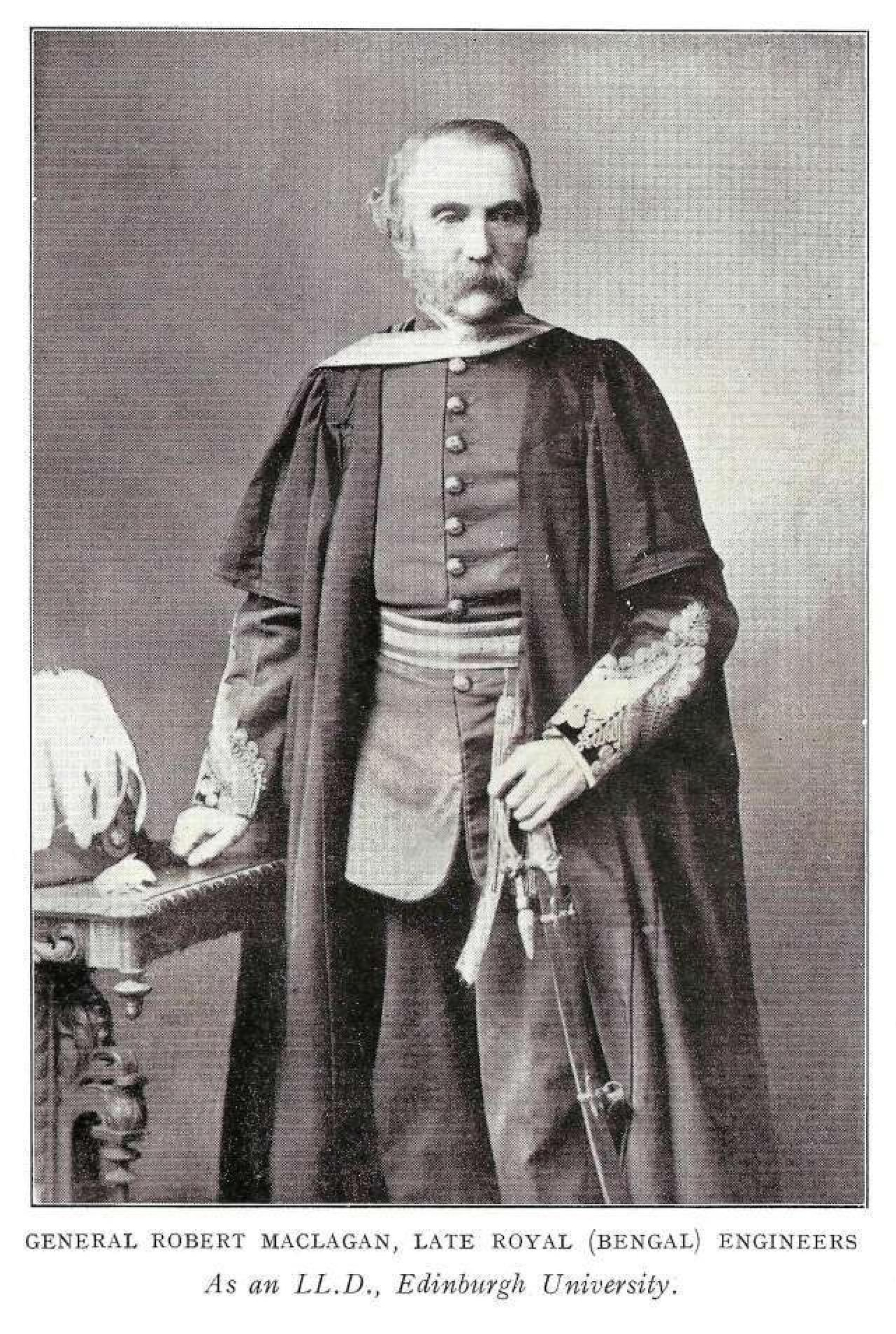
- Born: 14 December 1820
- Died: 1894 (aged 73–74)

General Sir Robert Maclagan KCMG FRSE FRGS (14 December 1820 – 1894) was a British Army officer and military engineer who served most of his career in India.

== Life ==
He was born on 14 December 1820 the son of Jane Whiteside and her husband, the eminent Edinburgh physician David Maclagan. His childhood home was 22 George Street in the centre of Edinburgh's New Town.

He was educated at the High School in Edinburgh and the University of Edinburgh but did not graduate. He then went to Addiscombe Military Seminary near London. He joined the Honourable East India Company as a 2nd Lieutenant in 1839. He then went to the School of Military Engineering in Chatham, to specialise as an engineer. He arrived in Delhi in India in 1842. He was in charge of the engineering works for the defence of Lahore in March 1846. Following severe illness he was given more sedate duties, including running the Civil Engineering College at Rurki aged 27. In the Mutiny of 1857 he successfully defended Rurki against the rebel forces. In his military career he rose to the rank of General, first in the Bengal Engineers then in the Royal Engineers.

In 1853 he was elected a Fellow of the Royal Society of Edinburgh his proposer being Sir Robert Christison.

From 1861 he ran the Public Works Department for all of the Punjab. Queen Victoria created him a Knight Commander of the Order of St Michael and St George (KCMG) for his efforts.

He retired in 1879. He spent most of his final years between Edinburgh and London.

He died in 1894.

== Family ==
His brothers included Andrew Douglas Maclagan and Rev William Maclagan, Archbishop of York.

His children included Robert Smeiton Maclagan CIE, Sir Edward Douglas Maclagan KCIE, and a daughter, Mary, who in 1892 married Charles Oman, an Oxford historian.

He was an uncle of Robert Craig Maclagan.
