= William Connor Magee =

Archbishop of York in 1891

The Most Reverend and Right Honourable William Connor Magee
- Archbishop of York
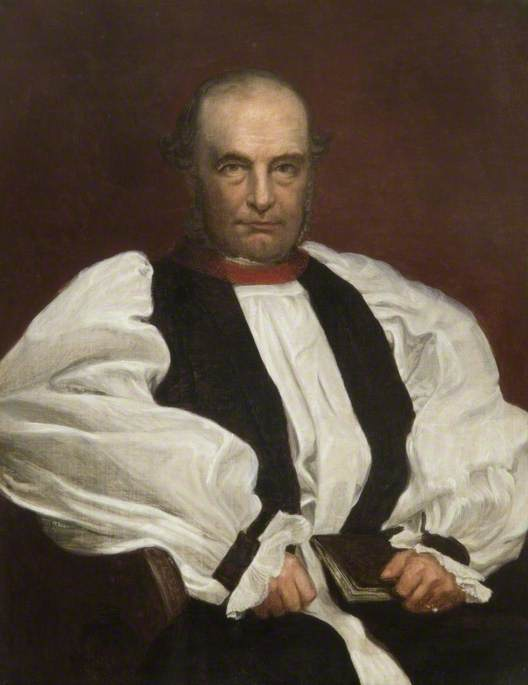
- Province: York
- Diocese: York
- Installed: 17 March 1891
- Term ended: 1891 (died)
- Predecessor: William Thomson
- Successor: William Maclagan
- Other post: Bishop of Peterborough (1868–1891)

Personal details
- Born: 12 December 1821 Cork, Ireland
- Died: 5 May 1891 (aged 69) London, England
- Buried: Peterborough Cathedral
- Denomination: Anglican
- Spouse: Anne Nisbitt Smith (m. 1851)
- Education: Trinity College, Dublin

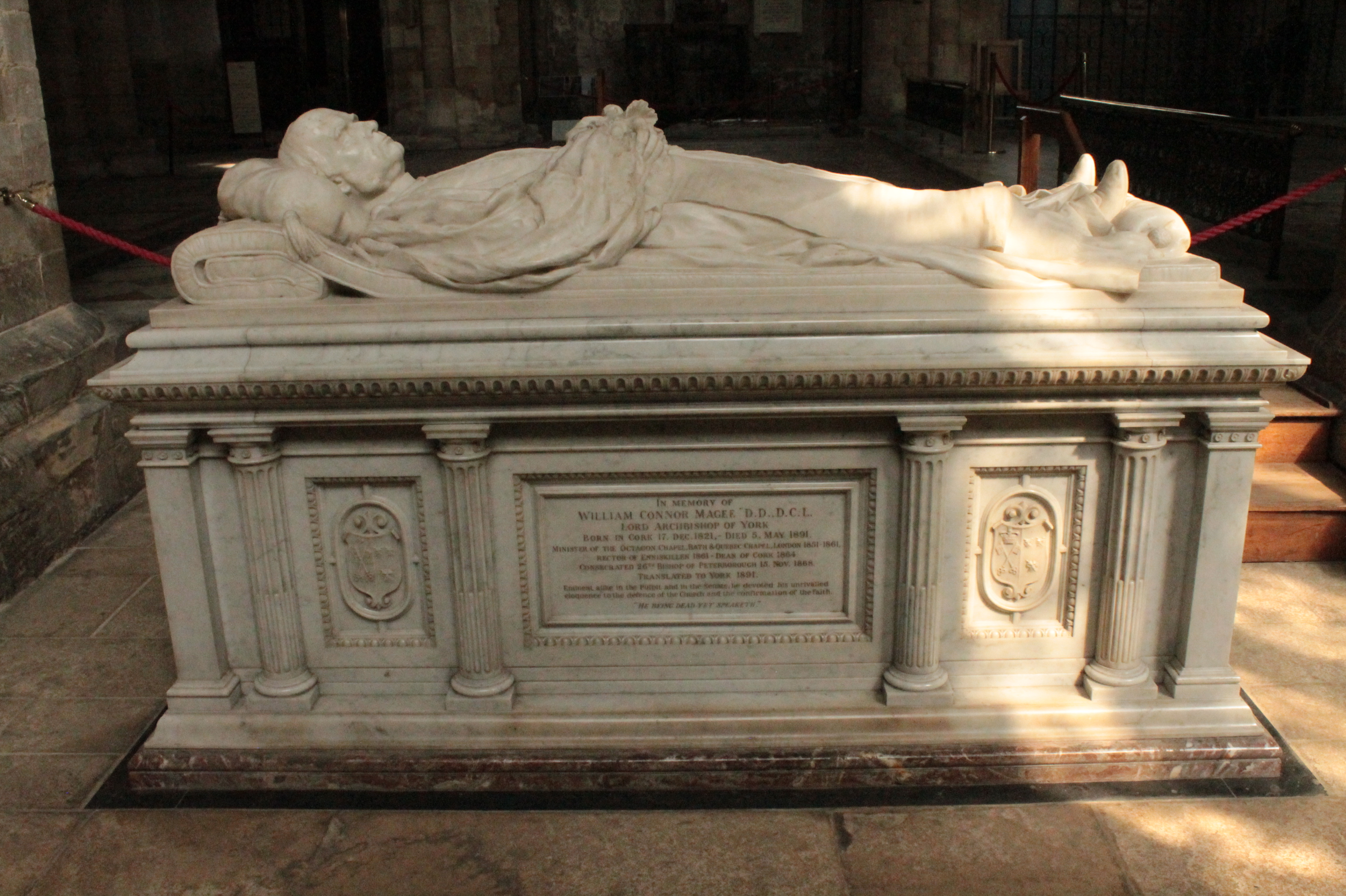
Monument to William Connor Magee, Peterborough Cathedral

William Connor Magee (17 December 1821 – 5 May 1891) was an Irish clergyman of the Anglican church, Bishop of Peterborough 1868–1891 and Archbishop of York for a short period in 1891.

== Life ==
He was born in Cork, Ireland. His father was a minor canon of St Fin Barre's Cathedral, Cork and a curate of the parish attached to the Anglican cathedral; his grandfather was William Magee, Archbishop of Dublin. Young Magee was educated at Kilkenny College and entered Trinity College, Dublin with a scholarship at thirteen. In November 1843, he delivered the inaugural address as Auditor of the reformed College Historical Society, in Trinity College.

He was ordained in 1844 to the curacy of St Thomas's, Dublin, but, being threatened with tuberculosis, went after two years to Málaga, Spain. On his return he took a curacy at Bath, England (1849–1851) and was then appointed to the Octagon Chapel (1851–1860). Some years afterwards he was made prebendary of Wells Cathedral. In 1860, poor health caused him to accept the living of Enniskillen, Ireland. In 1864 he was made Dean of Cork and in 1866, additionally, Dean of the Chapel Royal, Dublin Castle, and a chaplain to the Lord Lieutenant. Here he showed those gifts which ultimately raised him to high office; a powerful grasp of mental, moral and political problems, combined with eloquence of a high order, illuminated with brilliant flashes of wit.

In 1868 the question of the disestablishment of the Irish church came to the fore, and Magee threw himself into its defence. The success of his orations caused Prime Minister Benjamin Disraeli to offer him the bishopric of Peterborough, England. He justified his appointment by his speech when the Disestablishment Bill reached the House of Lords in 1869, and then plunged into diocesan and general work in England. He preached three sermons on Christian Evidence in Norwich Cathedral in 1871. He took up the temperance question, and declared in the House of Lords that he would rather see "England free than England compulsorily sober", a statement which was misquoted and attacked.

Initially critical of the calling of the second Lambeth Conference (1878) he was won over by the experience, writing in his biography that,

I feel I have learned much from the Pananglican and I see, too, that it is really an institution which will root itself and will ... exercise a powerful influence in the future of the Anglican Communion. That is a great deal so say on the part of one who greatly disliked and dreaded the affair from the first

He was a supporter of the movement for abolishing the recitation of the Athanasian Creed in the public services of the Church of England, believing, as he said, that the "presence" of the damnatory clauses, "as they stand and where they stand, is a real peril to the Church and to Christianity itself", and that those clauses "are no essential part" of the creed. The project was laid aside because of the hostility of a large body of the clergy, reinforced by the threat of Edward Bouverie Pusey and Canon Henry Parry Liddon to abandon their offices if it were carried.

He was elevated to the see of York in January 1891 and enthroned on 17 March. By this time his energies were exhausted, and he died on 5 May, four months after his appointment.

He was buried at Peterborough Cathedral. The life-size marble effigy marking his grave lies in the south aisle.

== Visitations ==
When Bishop of Peterborough, Magee devoted considerable effort to ministering to the rapidly growing population of Northampton. Responses to the questions he circulated to the clergy of the Rural Deanery of Northampton in the years 1872, 1875, 1878, 1882 and 1888 have been published, including a detailed introduction that describes the condition of the town at that time and associated issues.

== Family ==
He married his cousin Anne Smith in 1851.

== Legacy ==
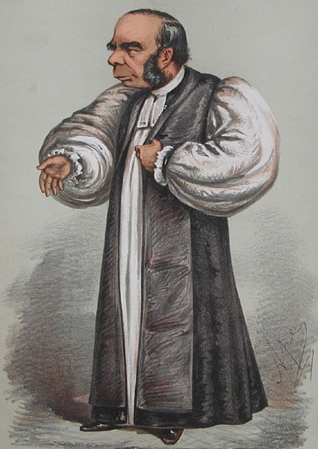
An 1869 caricature of Magee as Bishop of Peterborough by Carlo Pellegrini with the caption, "If eloquence could justify injustice he would have saved the Irish Church."

Magee had taken a prominent part in the Ritual controversy, opposing what he conceived to be romanising excess in ritual, as well as the endeavour of the opposite party to "put down Ritualism", as Disraeli expressed it, by the operation of the civil law. His incisive way of putting things earned for him the title of the "Militant Bishop", but his efforts were ever for peace. Magee's manifold activities, his capability as an administrator, his sound judgment, and his remarkable, insight into the ecclesiastical problems of his time, rank him among the most distinguished of English prelates.

== Quotes ==
"The man who makes no mistakes does not usually make anything." – W. C. Magee, 1868

"I should say it would be better that England should be free than that England should be compulsorily sober." 1872

== Works ==
- Anglican sisterhoods (1886)
- Christ the light of all Scripture (1892)

Church of England titles
Preceded by Francis Jeune	Bishop of Peterborough; 1868–1891	Succeeded by Mandell Creighton
Preceded by William Thomson	Archbishop of York; 1891	Succeeded by William Maclagan
