= William Maclagan =

Archbishop of York from 1891 to 1908

The Most Reverend and Right Honourable William Maclagan
- Archbishop of York
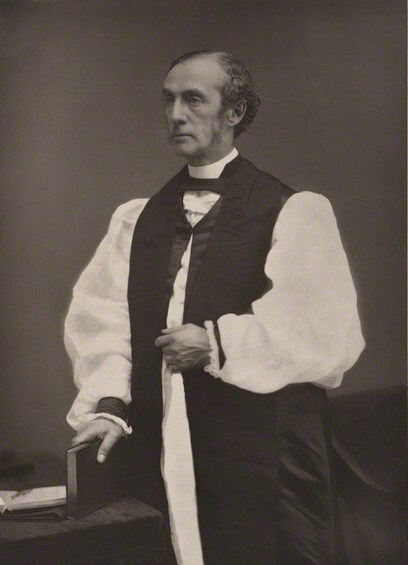
- Province: Province of York
- Diocese: Diocese of York
- Installed: 15 September 1891, York Minster
- Term ended: 1908 (ret.)
- Predecessor: William Connor Magee
- Successor: Cosmo Gordon Lang
- Other post: Bishop of Lichfield (24 June {?}/11 July 1878 {enthr.}–1891)

Personal details
- Born: 18 June 1826 Edinburgh, Edinburghshire, Scotland
- Died: 19 September 1910 (aged 84) South Kensington, Middlesex, England
- Buried: Bishopthorpe churchyard
- Denomination: Anglican
- Residence: Bishopthorpe Palace (as archbishop)
- Parents: David Maclagan & Jane née Whiteside
- Spouse: 1. Sarah née Clapham, 1860 (m.)–1862 (her d.); 2. the Hon Augusta née Barrington, 1878 (m.)–1910 (his d.)
- Children: with Sarah: Revd Walter & 1 other son; with Augusta: Sir Eric & 1 daughter
- Education: Royal High School, Edinburgh
- Alma mater: Peterhouse, Cambridge

Ordination history of William Maclagan
History
Diaconal ordination
- Date: Trinity Sunday 1856
Priestly ordination
- Date: 1857
Episcopal consecration
- Date: Nativity of John the Baptist 1878

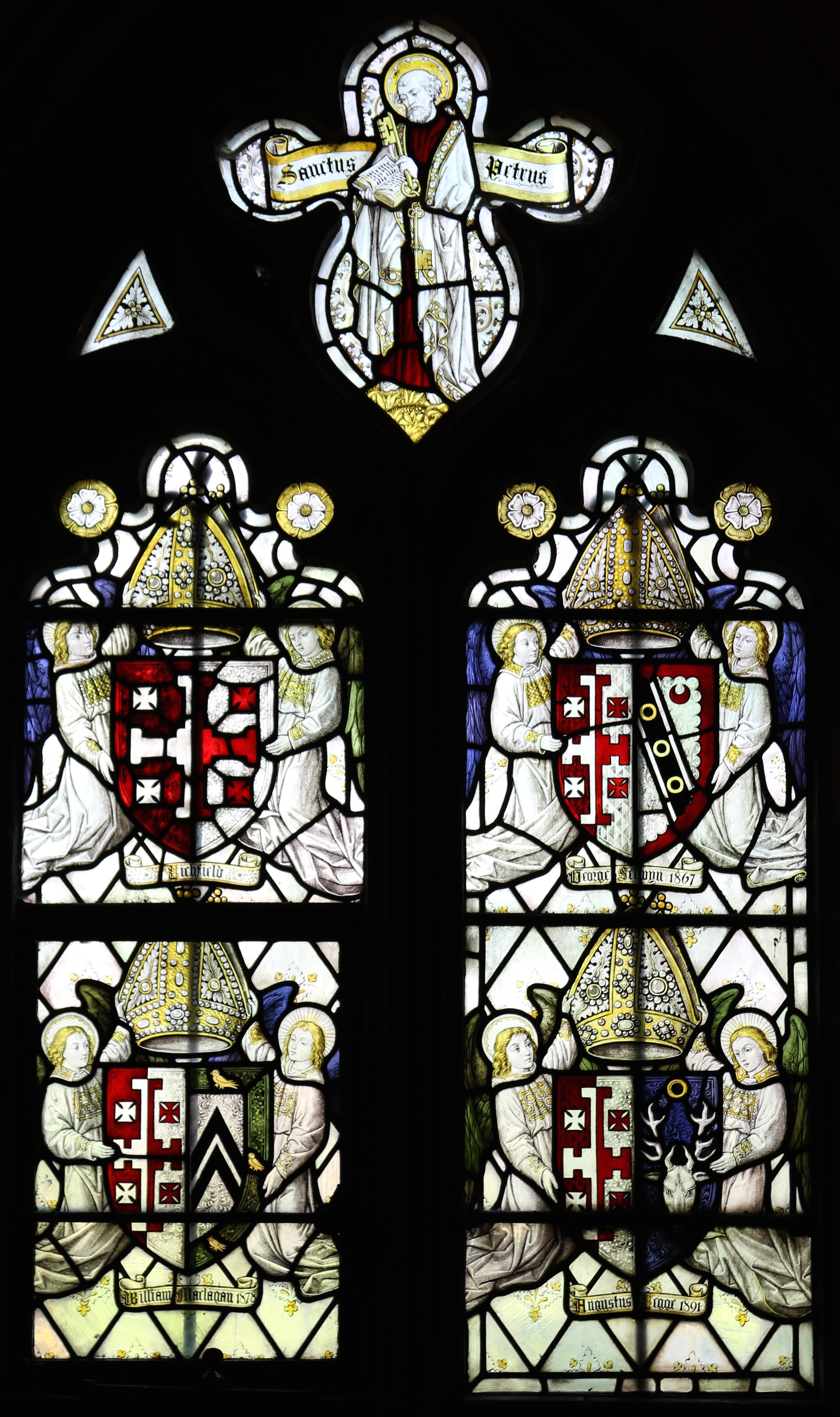
Stained glass window showing arms of Bishop Maclagan (bottom left), Church of the Holy Angels, Hoar Cross

William Dalrymple Maclagan (18 June 1826 – 19 September 1910) was Archbishop of York from 1891 to 1908, when he resigned his office. He was succeeded in 1909 by Cosmo Gordon Lang, later Archbishop of Canterbury. As Archbishop of York, Maclagan crowned Queen Alexandra in 1902.

== Early life ==
Maclagan, the fifth son of a distinguished Scottish physician David Maclagan FRSE (1785–1865), was born in Edinburgh in 1826, and educated at the Royal High School. His elder brother was the surgeon and scholar Douglas Maclagan. He served five years in the Indian Army rising to the rank of lieutenant and resigning on grounds of ill health.

In 1852, he matriculated at Peterhouse, Cambridge, where he received a degree in mathematics four years later; he was made a deacon that year (1856) in London, and served in the Church of England thereafter; he was ordained priest in 1857. In 1869, he became rector of Newington, and in 1875, vicar of St Mary Abbots, Kensington; both parishes being in the London conurbation. During this period, he composed several hymns. On 24 June 1878, he became Bishop of Lichfield, in the same year that he made a prestigious second marriage.

== Bishop of Lichfield (1878–1891) ==
He was consecrated a bishop by Archibald Campbell Tait, Archbishop of Canterbury, on the Feast of the Nativity of Saint John the Baptist 1878 (24 June) at St Paul's Cathedral.

== Archbishop of York (1891–1908) ==
In 1891 (possibly 28 July 1891), he was translated Archbishop of York, which position he held for the next seventeen years. He was appointed to the Privy Council after the accession of King Edward VII 24 January 1901. He made a private visit to Russia in 1897 and in the same year, he tried to create two new bishoprics, one in Sheffield. To do this, the Archbishop was prepared to surrender two thousand pounds of his considerable income – one thousand pounds for each new diocese, but the project still came to nothing. Maclagan complained that from 1891, he had been more Bishop than Archbishop owing to the large population and territory of the diocese. In 1906, he revived the idea, specifically naming Sheffield and Hull as the preferred seats for the new dioceses. By the end of his tenure, there were still only nine dioceses in the province. Sheffield did not get its own Bishop until 1914.

Maclagan was apparently a strong High Churchman, but his private beliefs had to be subsumed often. In 1899, he sat assessor with his ecclesiastical superior Frederick Temple, Archbishop of Canterbury (d. 1902), when the decision was given against the use of incense and other ritualistic practices, and was obliged loyally to uphold the primate's opinion. He was president of the Church Society for the Promotion of Kindness to Animals.

Maclagan resigned his office in 1908, possibly on grounds of ill health. Archbishop Maclagan died in London on 19 September 1910, and was survived by his second wife Augusta (1826–1915).

== Family ==
Maclagan was twice married. His first wife was Sarah Kate Clapham (1836–1864), whom he married in 1860 at the age of 34. By her he had two sons, Cyril and Walter.

He was married secondly on 12 November 1878 to the Honourable Augusta Anne Barrington (1836–1915), daughter of William Barrington, 6th Viscount Barrington. (Augusta Maclagan had money settled upon her when she married Maclagan, then Bishop of Lichfield, in 1878; for the sources of this money and how it was invested, see this paper. About half her money was settled upon her son Eric when he married in 1913. Thus, the Archbishop's wife, son and daughter-in-law all had independent means, necessary to preserve their social status.). By his second wife, he had a son Eric (1879–1951), and a daughter Theodora "Dora" Maclagan (1881–1976).

His eldest son Cyril died childless. His second son, Walter Dalrymple Maclagan (1862–1929), had a son William Dalrymple Maclagan, schoolmaster, and a daughter, Evelyn Maclagan, physician, both of whom apparently died unmarried. His third and youngest son, Eric Maclagan (1879–1951) married in 1913 and left two sons, Michael Maclagan (1914–2003), herald and historian; and Gerald Maclagan (d. 1942, killed in action), who had been working in Rhodesian Railways. His posterity is represented by the three surviving children of Michael Maclagan.

Maclagan was the younger brother of Professor Sir Douglas Maclagan, MD, otherwise known as Andrew Douglas Maclagan (1812–1900) and Sir Douglas, also educated at the Royal High School in Edinburgh, was a fellow of the Royal College of Surgeons of Edinburgh, 1833 and was knighted in 1886. He was a correspondent of Charles Darwin. Another brother was General Sir Robert Maclagan FRSE KCMG R.E. (1820–1893). The artist Philip Douglas Maclagan (1901–1972) is descended from an older brother.

== Royal connections ==
He baptised Princess Mary of York later Countess of Harewood, on 7 June 1897 at St Mary Magdalene's Church near Sandringham House. In 1902 he crowned Alexandra of Denmark, wife of Edward VII, as Queen of the United Kingdom.

== Hymns ==
Hymns composed by Maclagan include:

- "The Saints of God! their conflict past", 1869 first appeared in Church Bells (lyrics, or here)
- "It is finished! blessed Jesus" (music and lyrics here)
- "Palms of glory, raiment bright", date not known.
- "Thine for ever! God of love" a hymn by Mary Maude for which Maclagan wrote the tune "Newington", named for Newington, the parish in Surrey where he was rector between 1869 and 1875.

== Works ==
Written works by Maclagan include:

- Frederick Temple and William Dalrymple Maclagan. "Answer of the Archbishops of Canterbury and York to the Bull Apostolicae Curae of H. H. Leo XIII" (on English Ordinations), dated circa 1897
- William Dalrymple Maclagan. Hymns and Hymn Tunes by the late Archbishop MacLagan, printed for use in York Minster, etc. by William Dalrymple Maclagan (1915)
- William Dalrymple Maclagan Archbishop of York on reservation of Sacrament (1900)

== Sources ==
- Chisholm, Hugh, ed. (1922). "Maclagan, William Dalrymple" . Encyclopædia Britannica. Vol. 31 (12th ed.). London & New York: The Encyclopædia Britannica Company. p. 828.
- "Most Rev. William Dalrymple Maclagan from The Gazetteer for Scotland". Gazetteer for Scotland.
- Ward, A. W.; Machin, Ian (reviser) (2004). "Maclagan, William Dalrymple (1826–1910)". Oxford Dictionary of National Biography (online ed.). Oxford University Press. doi:10.1093/ref:odnb/34773. (Subscription, Wikipedia Library access or UK public library membership required.)

== Images ==
Maclagan's portrait can be seen here, and here.

- A younger man as Lord Bishop of Lichfield, between 1878 and 1891.
- Images at the National Portrait Gallery

Church of England titles
Preceded by George Selwyn	Bishop of Lichfield; 1878–1891	Succeeded by Augustus Legge
Preceded by William Connor Magee	Archbishop of York; 1891–1908	Succeeded by Cosmo Gordon Lang
