= Portland Tiara =

Diamond encrusted gold and silver tiara made by Cartier

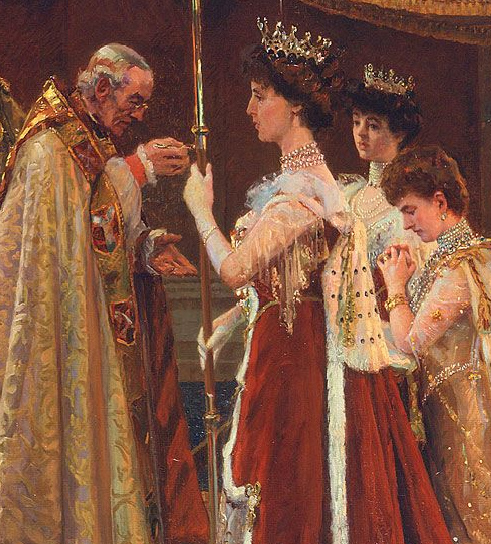
Winifred (left) at the anointing of Queen Alexandra, 1902

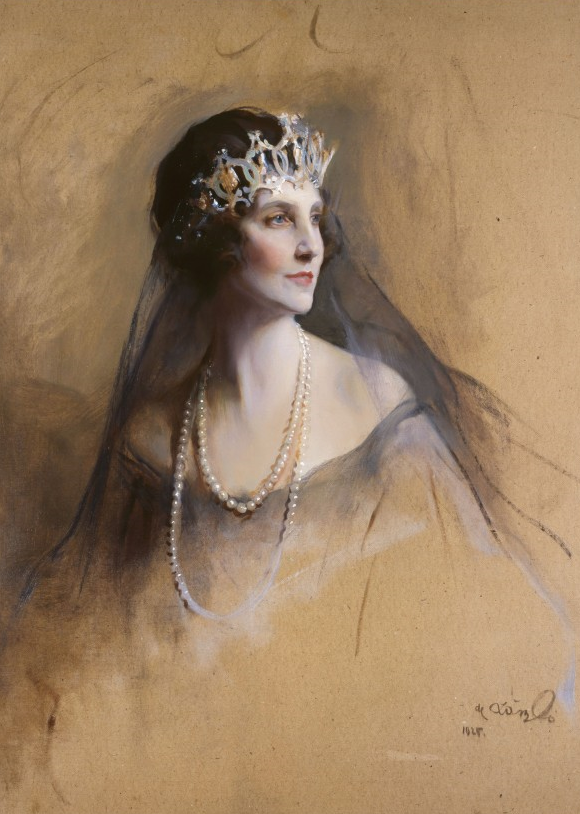
Portrait of Winifred Cavendish-Bentinck, Duchess of Portland wearing the Portland Tiara, by Philip de László, 1925

The Portland Tiara was a diamond-encrusted gold and silver tiara made by Cartier for Winifred, Duchess of Portland to wear at the coronation of Edward VII and Queen Alexandra in 1902. It was exhibited at the Harley Gallery and Foundation's Portland Collection from 2016 until it was stolen and broken up in November 2018. The tiara was estimated to be worth £3.75 million.

== History ==
In 1902, William Cavendish-Bentinck, 6th Duke of Portland commissioned Cartier to make the tiara for Winifred, his wife, to wear at the coronation of Edward VII and Queen Alexandra. Winifred was one of the duchesses who held a canopy over Alexandra during her anointing ceremony. Afterwards, some of the gems were removed from the tiara to make a brooch. The gems are absent in a 1925 portrait of Duchess Winifred wearing the tiara.

=== Theft ===
In 2016, the Harley Gallery and Foundation opened the Portland Collection Gallery within the estate of Welbeck Abbey, Nottinghamshire. The tiara and brooch were displayed in an armoured glass case. On 20 November 2018, thieves entered the gallery at around 22:00, broke into the display case using power tools and took the tiara and brooch. Security personnel arrived 90 seconds after the alarms went off, but the perpetrators managed to escape. Four people were arrested on 3 December 2018 on suspicion of burglary. At their trial in 2022, the prosecution said the Portland Tiara and brooch were taken to a workshop in London's Hatton Garden jewellery quarter within hours of the burglary. On 8 July 2022, three men were found guilty of stealing the tiara and brooch, which it is believed were transferred from London to Turkey.

== Appearance ==
The tiara was covered with brilliant cushion- and briolette-cut diamonds. The briolettes were supplied to Cartier by the Duke of Portland and probably date from the 17th century. The centrepiece was the Portland Diamond, which dates from the 19th century. It was flanked by two diamond drops and other pendant diamonds, all set in gold and silver.

== See also ==
- List of heists in the United Kingdom
