= Winifred Cavendish-Bentinck, Duchess of Portland =

British humanitarian, animal welfare activist and noblewoman

Her Grace The Duchess of Portland DBE JP
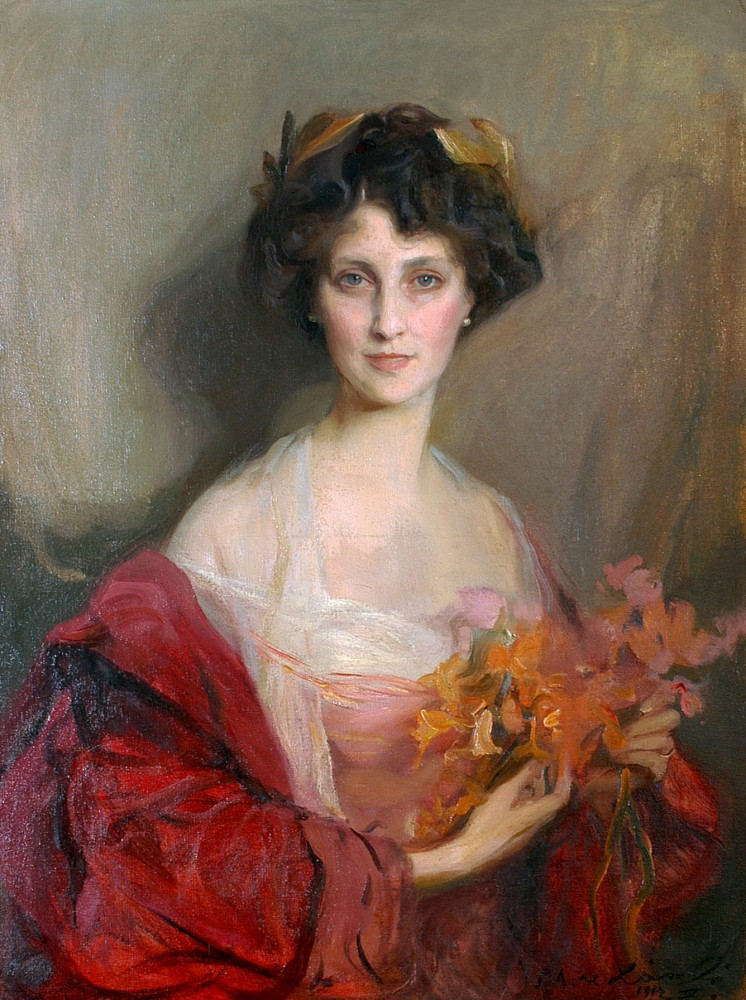
- Winifred Dallas-Yorke by Philip de László, 1912

Personal details
- Born: Winifred Anna Dallas-Yorke; 7 September 1863 Murthly Castle, Perthshire, Scotland
- Died: 30 July 1954 (aged 90) Welbeck Abbey, Nottinghamshire, England
- Spouse: William John Arthur James Cavendish-Bentinck, 6th Duke of Portland (m. 1889; died 1943)
- Children: Lady Victoria Erskine-Wemyss; William Cavendish-Bentinck, 7th Duke of Portland; Lord Francis Cavendish-Bentinck

Winifred Anna Cavendish-Bentinck, Duchess of Portland DBE JP (née Dallas-Yorke; 7 September 1863 – 30 July 1954) was a British humanitarian and animal welfare activist.

== Background ==
Born at Murthly Castle, Perthshire, she was the only daughter of Thomas Yorke Dallas-Yorke, DL, JP (1826 – 25 November 1924), of Walmsgate, Lincolnshire, and Frances (née Graham).

She served as a canopy bearer to Queen Alexandra at the 1902 coronation of King Edward VII, and was Mistress of the Robes from 1913 until Alexandra's death in 1925.

The Duchess was a Justice of the Peace for Nottinghamshire when based at the family seat Welbeck Abbey.

== Marriage and issue ==
Winifred married William John Arthur James Cavendish-Bentinck on 11 June 1889. They had three children:

- Lady Victoria Alexandrina Violet Cavendish-Bentinck (27 February 1890 – 8 May 1994); christened at Windsor Castle with Queen Victoria as her godmother; she was the Queen's last surviving godchild. She married Captain Michael Erskine-Wemyss and had issue.
- William Arthur Henry Cavendish-Bentinck, 7th Duke of Portland (1893–1977); he married Ivy Gordon-Lennox and had issue.
- Lord Francis Morven Dallas Cavendish-Bentinck (27 July 1900 – 22 August 1950)

Winifred Cavendish-Bentinck, Duchess of Portland, was interred at the traditional burial place of the Dukes of Portland in the churchyard of St Winifred's Church at Holbeck.

== Animal welfare ==
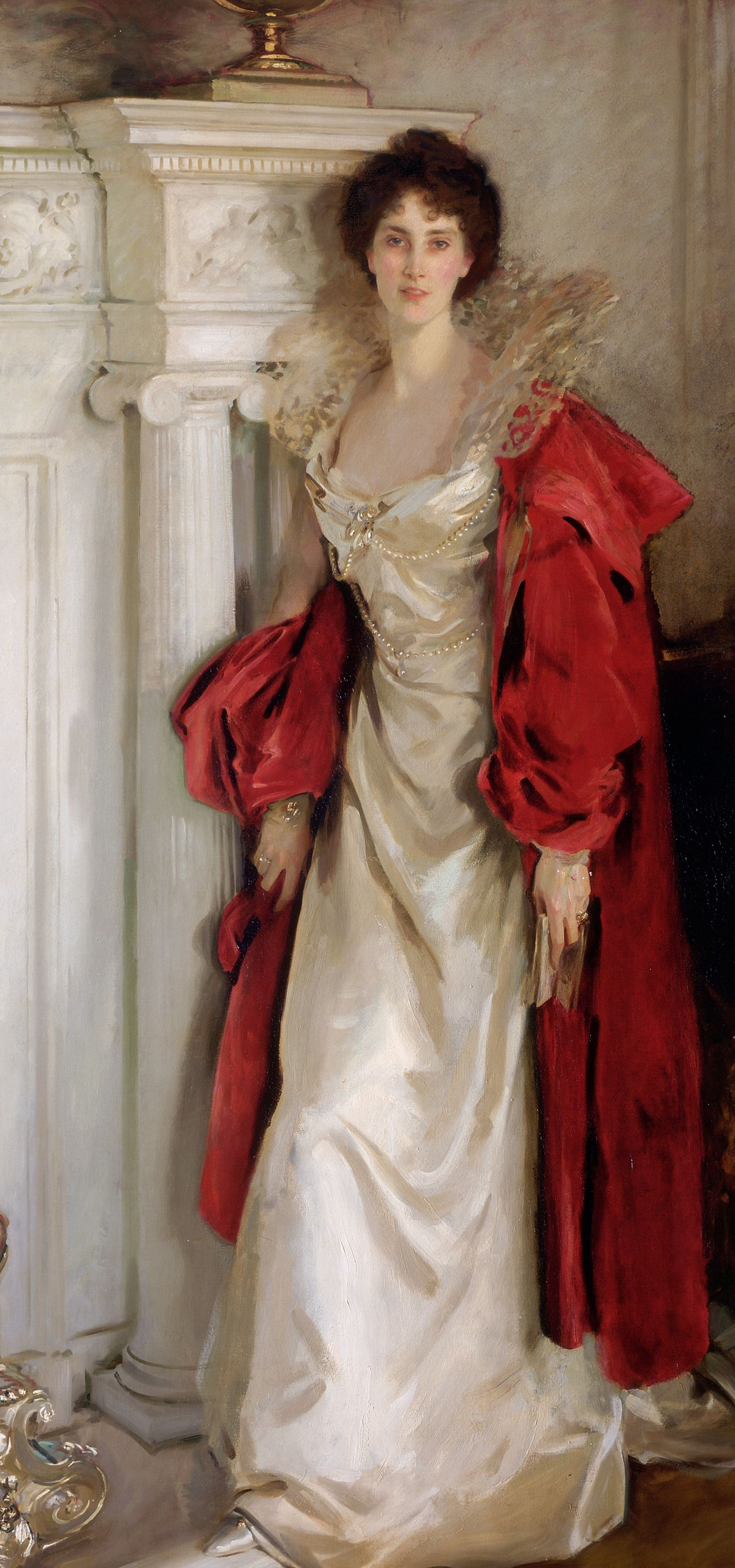
Portrait of the Duchess of Portland, oil on canvas, John Singer Sargent, 1902

The Duchess of Portland was a passionate animal lover, who kept stables for old horses and ponies, as well as dogs needing homes. In 1891, she became the first (and longest serving) president of the Royal Society for the Protection of Birds until her death in 1954. She was vice-president of the Royal Society for the Prevention of Cruelty to Animals and was president of the ladies committee of the RSPCA. She was elected as the third President of the Nottinghamshire Beekeepers' Association in 1907. The Duchess was a patron of Our Dumb Friends' League Horse Ambulance Fund. She was a committee member of the Animals' Institute located on Kinnerton Street. The Animals' Institute was a hospital that assisted poor owners of sick animals to obtain veterinary treatment. She was also a patron of the Church Society for the Promotion of Kindness to Animals.

The Duchess became a vegetarian in the early 1900s. Her daughter was also a vegetarian. Her diet consisted of vegetables, biscuits, butter, cheese, skimmed milk, lettuce and eggs. She was a member of the Vegetarian Society. In 1913, the Duchess commented "I never drink tea, I have never touched wine of any sort and I am absolutely a vegetarian".

== Social reform ==
In 1889, she persuaded the duke to use a large portion of his horseracing winnings to build almshouses at Welbeck, which he named "The Winnings". She cared greatly for the local miners and supported them by paying for medical treatments, and organising cooking and sewing classes for their daughters. She also sponsored a miner, with an interest in art, to study in London.

"In addition to the famous racing stables, where a number of the Duke of Portland's most celebrated horses (including "St. Simon") were to be seen, there is a group of substantially built almshouses, known as "The Winnings," which were erected by the Duke at the request of his wife out of the money won in seven races, viz., the Two Thousand Guineas in 1888 by "Ayrshire", the Derby and St. Leger in 1889 by "Donovan", the Oaks and St. Leger in 1890 by "Memoir", and the One Thousand Guineas in 1890 by "Semolina".

== Honours ==
In honour of her support, the Nottinghamshire Miners' Welfare Association petitioned the king on her behalf; and in 1935 she was made a Dame Commander of the Order of the British Empire (DBE) on his silver jubilee.

She was also made a Dame of the Order of Queen Maria Luisa in Spain.

== Legacy ==
In 2010, a collection of jewels belonging to the Duchess was auctioned at Christies, including antique pearl and diamond brooches, and the Portland sapphire tiara.

The Portland diamond tiara, which was specially made for Edward VII's coronation, was stolen in November 2018.

Court offices
Preceded by The Duchess of Buccleuch and Queensberry	Mistress of the Robes to Queen Alexandra; 1912–1925	Succeeded by —
