= Church Society for the Promotion of Kindness to Animals =

Former British animal welfare organisation

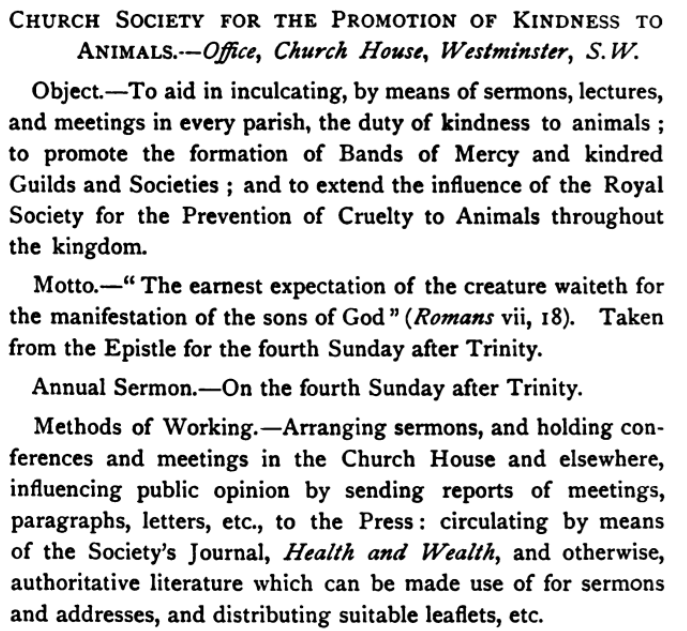
- Abbreviation: CSPKA
- Formation: 1893
- Founder: Rev. F. Lawrence
- Type: Animal welfare organisation
- Purpose: Slaughter reform
- Headquarters: Church House, Westminster
- Region served: United Kingdom

The Church Society for the Promotion of Kindness to Animals (CSPKA) was an Anglican animal welfare organisation based in the United Kingdom.

== History ==
The Church Society for the Promotion of Kindness to Animals was founded in 1893 by Rev. F. Lawrence who was its honorary secretary. Their head office was based at Church House, Westminster. In 1897, Lawrence commented that "Christ's life and death show forth the principle of action which Christians are to follow in their dealings with all living creatures. Animals are less able to defend themselves than man, and the need greater consideration and care than the Church has hitherto urged in their behalf". Lawrence was vicar of Westow Vicarage, Kirkham Abbey in Yorkshire. He argued that while animals were to serve man including providing their flesh as food they were man's companions deserving of kind treatment. The Society worked with the RSPCA and supported improving animal welfare legislation.

The Society campaigned for churches to observe a fixed Animal Sunday. They appointed June 28, the fourth Sunday after Trinity as "Kindness to Animals Sunday" for the Christian duty of kindness to animals. The Society also campaigned for humane slaughter and promoted the use of W. W. Greener's Humane Cattle Killer. The instrument consisted of a single rifle barrel, cartridge chamber and detonating mechanism which would be held on the animal's forehead for instantaneous and painless slaughter. Although some anti-vivisectionists attended meetings, the Society refused to condemn vivisection. In 1896, the Society tested a "painless cattle killer" at a slaughterhouse in Malton. The Society's first meeting of the general committee was held at St Matthias' Church in 1902.

William Maclagan, the Archbishop of York, was president of the Society. Notable members included Percy Alexander MacMahon, Charles Rolls and William Sinclair.

In 1900, Rev. F. Lawrence, planned to visit Washington to promote the Society to William McKinley. In 1903, the Duchess of Portland chaired the Society's annual meeting. She was also a patron. The Society published the Health and Wealth magazine.

== Criticism ==
The Society was criticized by anti-vivisection organizations for not condemning shooting and vivisection which they found hypocritical. An article in The Zoophilist dismissed the Society as "flabby and backboneless". William Coulson described the Society as a fraud and "humbug" as it was afraid to speak out against blood sports and vivisection.

Edith Carrington and George William Cox both resigned in 1894. Carrington commented that "to be silent as to vivisection is tacitly to help it, and it adds a thousandfold to the wrong that it should be done in the name of the Holy Church".

== Selected publications ==
- Regulation of Slaughter-Houses. London: Her Majesty's Stationery Office. 1897.
