= Andrew Douglas Maclagan =

Scottish surgeon (1812–1900)

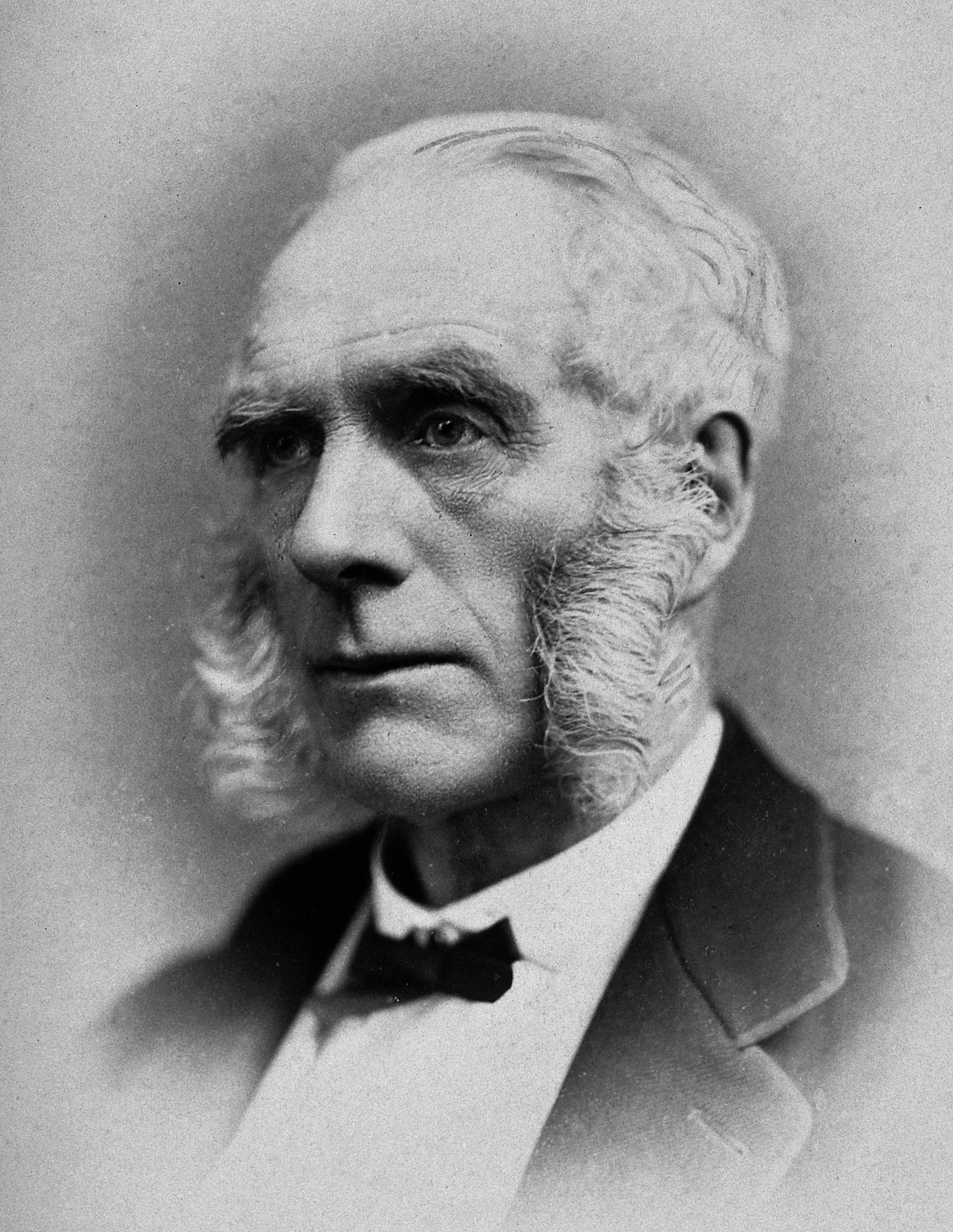
Andrew Douglas Maclagan in 1881

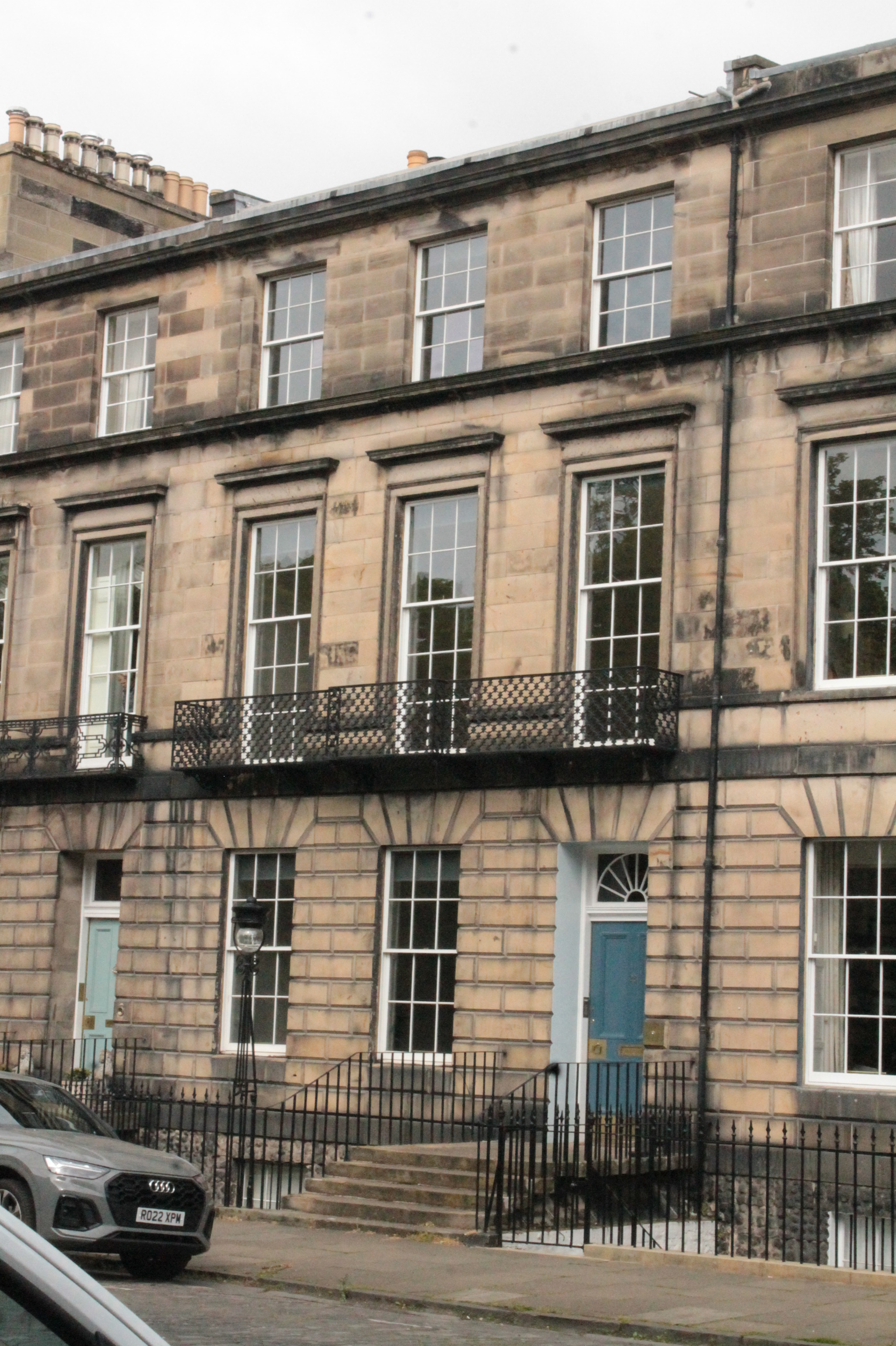
28 Heriot Row, Edinburgh

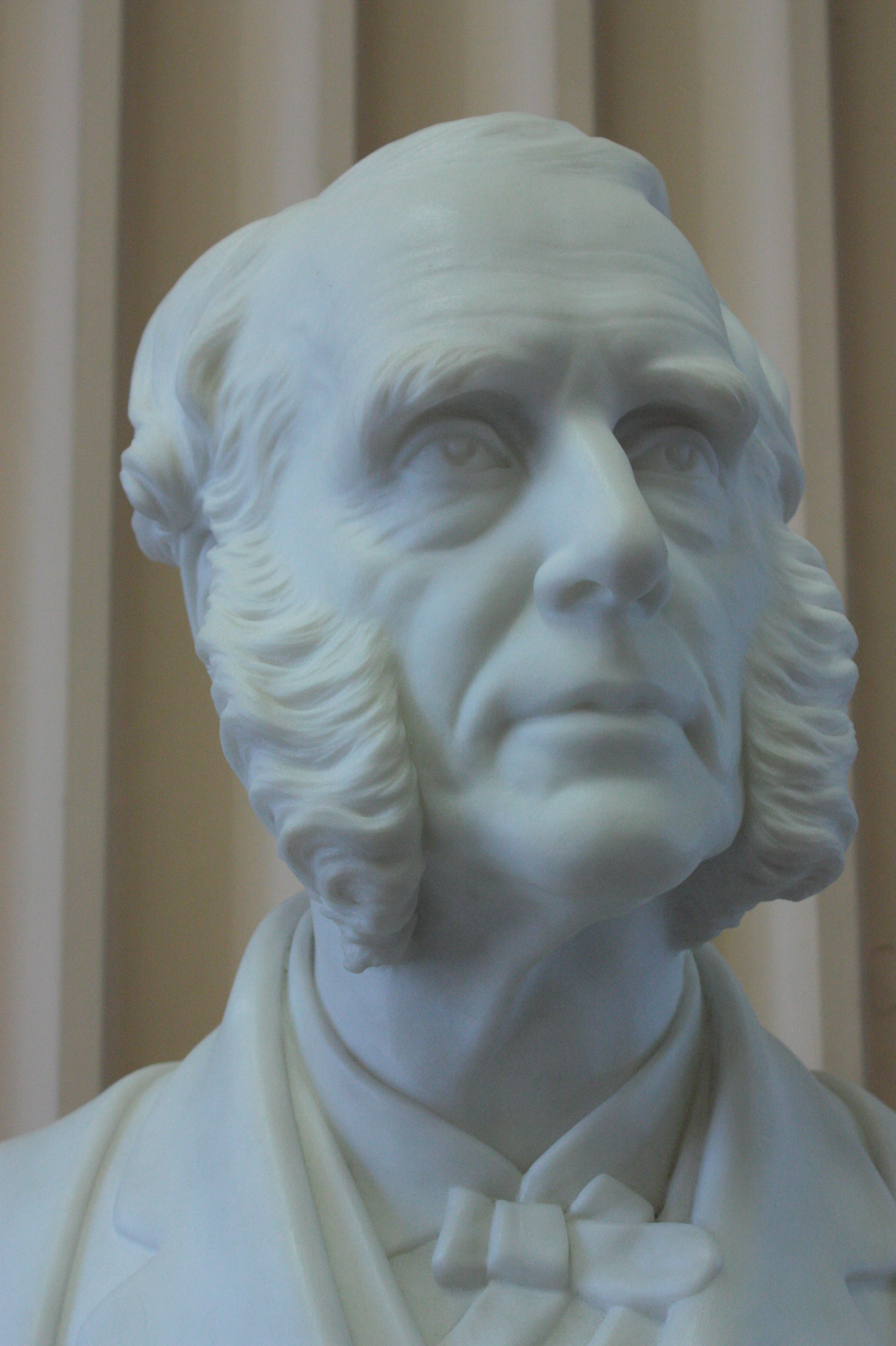
Douglas Maclagan by John Hutchison

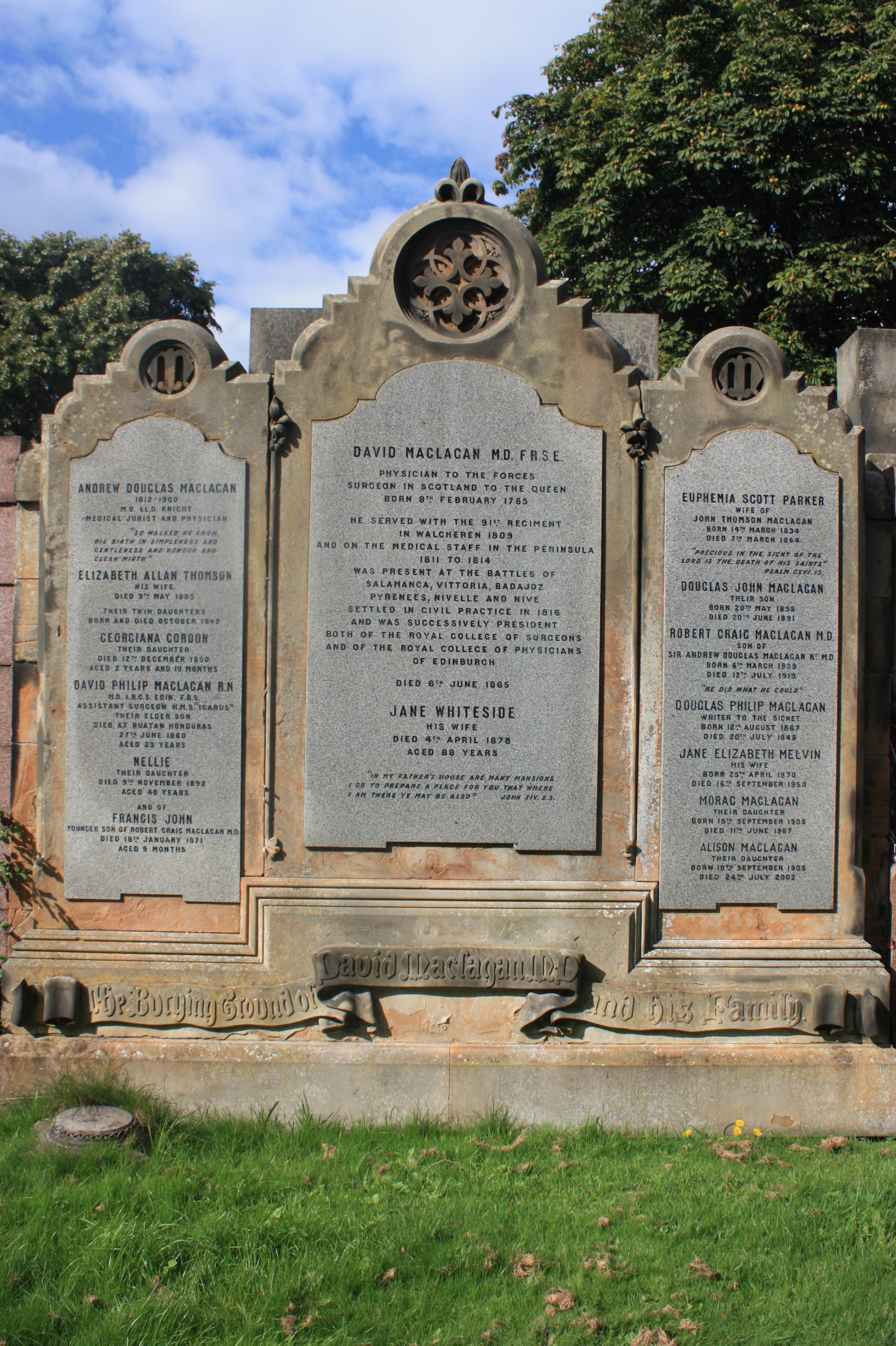
The Maclagan grave, Dean Cemetery, Edinburgh

Sir Andrew Douglas Maclagan PRSE FRCPE FRCSE FCS FRSSA (17 April 1812, in Ayr – 5 April 1900, in Edinburgh) was a Scottish surgeon, toxicologist and scholar of medical jurisprudence. He served as president of 5 learned societies: the Royal Medical Society (1832), the Royal College of Surgeons of Edinburgh (1859–61), the Royal College of Physicians of Edinburgh (1884–87), the Royal Society of Edinburgh (1890–5), and the Royal Scottish Society of Arts (1900).

== Life ==
He was born on 17 April 1812 in Ayr to the Scottish physician David Maclagan FRSE (1785–1865), and Jane Whiteside.

He was the elder brother of William Dalrymple Maclagan, who would become Archbishop of York; and of the engineer and soldier Gen Sir Robert Maclagan. His youngest brother was the eminent accountant, David Maclagan FRSE (1824-1883) manager of the Edinburgh Life Assurance Company.

Douglas was educated at the Royal High School and the University of Edinburgh, graduating in 1833. He subsequently toured hospitals in London and in continental Europe with James Young Simpson.

On his return to Scotland, Maclagan was appointed Assistant Surgeon at the Royal Infirmary of Edinburgh. He lectured on Materia Medica at the Edinburgh Extramural School of Medicine 1845-1862. Maclagan was a close friend of toxicologist Robert Christison, and he developed an interest in toxicology and forensic medicine.

In 1837 Maclagan was elected a member of the Harveian Society of Edinburgh and served as President in 1854. He served a second term as President in 1882, which was the centenary of the Society. He was elected a Fellow of the Royal Society of Edinburgh in 1843, his proposer being Robert Christison. He served as their Curator 1856-1878, Vice President 1878-1890, and President 1890-1895. In 1843 Maclagan was also elected a member of the Aesculapian Club and is by a considerable margin its longest serving member; he remained an active participant in the Club until his death.

Maclagan was appointed to the Chair of Medical Jurisprudence and Public Health at the University of Edinburgh in 1862, retiring in 1897. This included some of the world's first lectures on Forensic Science.

He died at home, 28 Heriot Row in Edinburgh on 5 April 1900.

He is buried with his wife and children in Dean Cemetery on the west side of Edinburgh. He is buried in his father's plot, against the north wall of the original cemetery, backing onto the north extension.

== Trials of note ==
In his role both as a toxicologist and forensic scientist Maclagan gave evidence in many trials, including some very notable cases:

- Junior assistant to Robert Christison in the medical evidence for the Burke and Hare trial
- Affirmed the victim was poisoned by arsenic in the Madeleine Smith trial (1857)
- Affirmed use of poison in the trial of Eugene Marie Chantrelle (1878)

== Artistic recognition ==
A bust of Maclagan by Sir John Steell is held at the Royal College of Physicians of Edinburgh.

== Positions of note ==
- President of the Royal Medical Society 1832
- President of the Harveian Society of Edinburgh 1854 and 1882
- President of the Royal College of Surgeons of Edinburgh 1859-1861
- President of the Royal College of Physicians of Edinburgh 1884-1887
- President of the Royal Society of Edinburgh 1890-1895
- Honorary Fellow of the Pharmaceutical Society of Britain
- President of the Royal Scottish Society of Arts 1900
- Brigade Surgeon to the Royal Company of Archers

== Honours ==
Maclagan was knighted in 1886.

== Publications ==
- A probationary essay on carbuncle (1833)
- Cases of Poisoning with Remarks (1849)
- Nugae canorae medicae: lays by the poet laureate of the New Town Dispensary (1850)

== Family ==
Maclagan was married to Elizabeth Allan Thomson (d.1885). They had twin daughters who died in infancy in 1842, plus a further infant daughter who died in 1850.

A son, David Philip Maclagan, was a surgeon in the Royal Navy and died in Honduras in 1860, aged only 23.

Nellie, their only surviving daughter, died in 1892 aged 48.

His son Dr Robert Craig Maclagan FRSE (1839–1919) was a prominent physician and anthropologist.

== See also ==
- Public health
