= Harley Gallery and Foundation =

Coordinates: 53.26228°N 1.1774°W

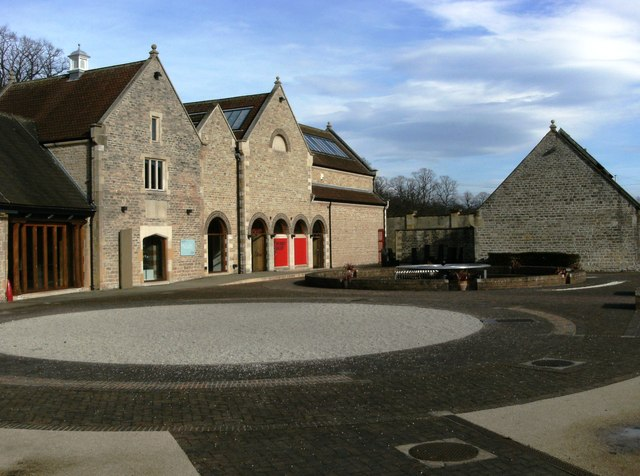
The Harley Gallery and its courtyard

The Harley Gallery and Foundation is an educational charity situated on the ducal estate of Welbeck Abbey in North Nottinghamshire.

== Harley Foundation ==
The Harley Foundation was set up in 1977 by Ivy, Duchess of Portland, "to encourage creativity in all of us". The Harley Foundation works towards this aim through the activities of The Portland Collection, The Harley Gallery and The Harley Foundation Studios. The Harley Foundation is a registered charity and in 2010-11 had a gross income of £11,416,110.

== Harley Gallery ==
The Gallery works towards the Foundation's objectives through the historical and contemporary exhibition programme, craft shop, events and education activities.

=== History and architecture ===
The Harley Gallery was built in 1994, "converted with great aplomb by Leo Godlewski from the old estate gasworks built by the 5th Duke in 1860."

The gas works were built to illuminate the 5th Duke's "New Works" at Welbeck, and were one of his early buildings. These works provided light and heat for the gallops, gardens and "underground drives which lace the Park... lit both by circular, plate glass skylights and gas lamps fed from the Duke's own purpose-built gas works (now the Harley Gallery)." The gas works were in a state of ruin when work began to convert them into the Gallery; however, parts of the original detail and character of the original building were retained - including an original roof truss which is still visible within the building.

The building won a Civic Trust Award for Architecture in 1995.

=== Exhibitions ===
The three gallery spaces are used to exhibit a wide variety of contemporary and historical art and craft, with exhibitions changing five times a year. Previous fine art exhibitions have included David Hockney, Peter Blake, Euan Uglow and George Stubbs. Craft exhibitions have included Kate Malone, Junko Mori and Hiroshi Suzuki.

The Craft Shop stocks work by over 300 makers.

The Gallery building is situated in courtyard gardens, adjacent to the 5th Duke's extensive kitchen garden. This garden was modelled after "the seventeen acre royal walled gardens in Windsor Great Park. Not to be outdone, the Duke of Portland enclosed twenty two acres". The kitchen garden walls are still present, and Dukeries Garden Centre is situated within the walls. Some of the original Victorian glasshouses can be seen in the garden centre. The car park for The Harley Gallery is located in the area of the Kitchen Garden that was known as "California" - being the warmest, sunniest area.

The courtyard gardens also contain the Welbeck Farm Shop and the Limehouse Cafe. The cafe building was converted from the Lime House, which was used in the production of the gas, which was then stored in large circular gasometers- the circular shapes can still be seen in the courtyard.

=== Events and education ===
The Gallery and Foundation provide an educational programme of events, including workshops for primary school children, lectures on art history, and work with local students.

== Harley Foundation Studios ==
The Harley Foundation Studios are workspaces close to the Harley Gallery, which are used by a wide variety of artists and craftspeople. Studio artists have included conservators, fine artists, photographers, textile artists, ceramicists, printmakers and sculptors. The studios are open to the public once a year, as part of the Harley Art and Food Market and Open Studios.

=== History and architecture ===
Situated inside what was the Welbeck Estate's extensive kitchen gardens built by the 5th Duke of Portland, the Harley Studios have been built within the "Tan Gallop", and on the sites of the cucumber and pineapple pits - the latter - "Pineapple Place" designed by John Outram.

=== Support for artists ===
The Harley Foundation provides "craftspeople and artists affordable working space in peaceful surroundings". The Foundation also operates an "incubator space" for new artists, to assist them in setting up their practice, and grant-aid.

== Portland Collection ==
The Portland Collection opened in 2016 adjacent to The Harley Gallery. This gallery space shows works from the historical fine and decorative art collection of the Cavendish-Bentinck family, "one of Britain’s largest aristocratic art collections".

=== History and architecture ===
The Portland Collection was designed by Hugh Broughton Architects, and was named RIBA East Midlands Building of the Year in 2016.

The new gallery is housed within the walls of the Victorian "Tan Gallop", a redundant structure previously used for training racehorses.

=== Exhibitions ===
The Portland Collection contains two galleries and a glazed entrance pavilion. The gallery spaces show displays from the Collection, which "offers important works – among them, Michelangelo's The Madonna of Silence, van Dyck's First Earl of Strafford, equestrian studies by George Stubbs, and portraits by John Singer Sargent. And these are supported by glittering ducal valuables and curios, including the pearl earring worn by Charles I at his execution in 1649."

Displays change every three years, with some pieces, such as works on paper and miniature portraits, changing more frequently.

The Portland Tiara was stolen from the Harley Gallery in November 2018.
