= William Thomson (bishop) =

Archbishop of York from 1862 to 1890

The Most Reverend and Right Honourable William Thomson FRS FRGS
- Archbishop of York
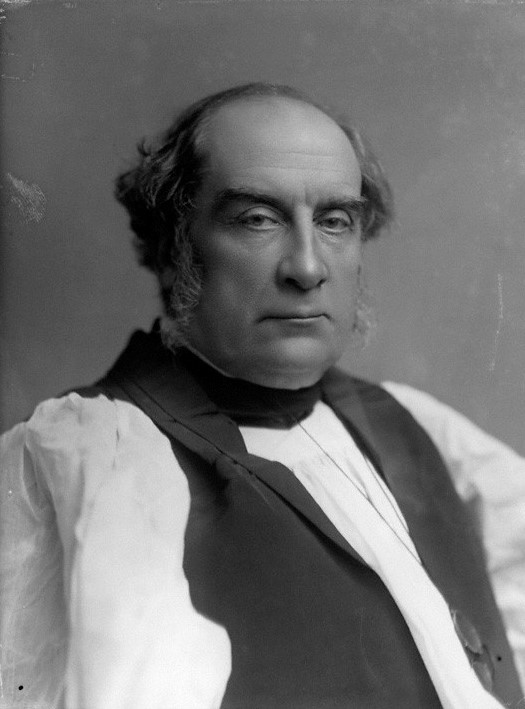
- Thomson in 1883
- Church: Church of England
- Province: Province of York
- Diocese: Diocese of York
- Elected: 1862
- Term ended: 1890 (death)
- Predecessor: Charles Longley
- Successor: William Connor Magee
- Other post: Bishop of Gloucester and Bristol

Personal details
- Born: 11 February 1819 Whitehaven, Cumberland
- Died: 25 December 1890 (aged 71)
- Buried: Bishopthorpe
- Denomination: Anglican
- Spouse: Zoë Skene
- Education: Shrewsbury School
- Alma mater: The Queen's College, Oxford

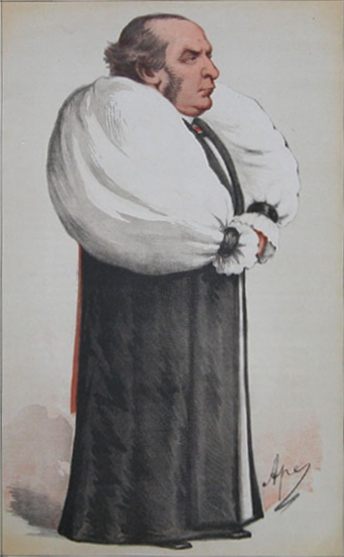
"The Archbishop of Society" As depicted by "Ape" (Carlo Pellegrini) in Vanity Fair, 24 June 1871

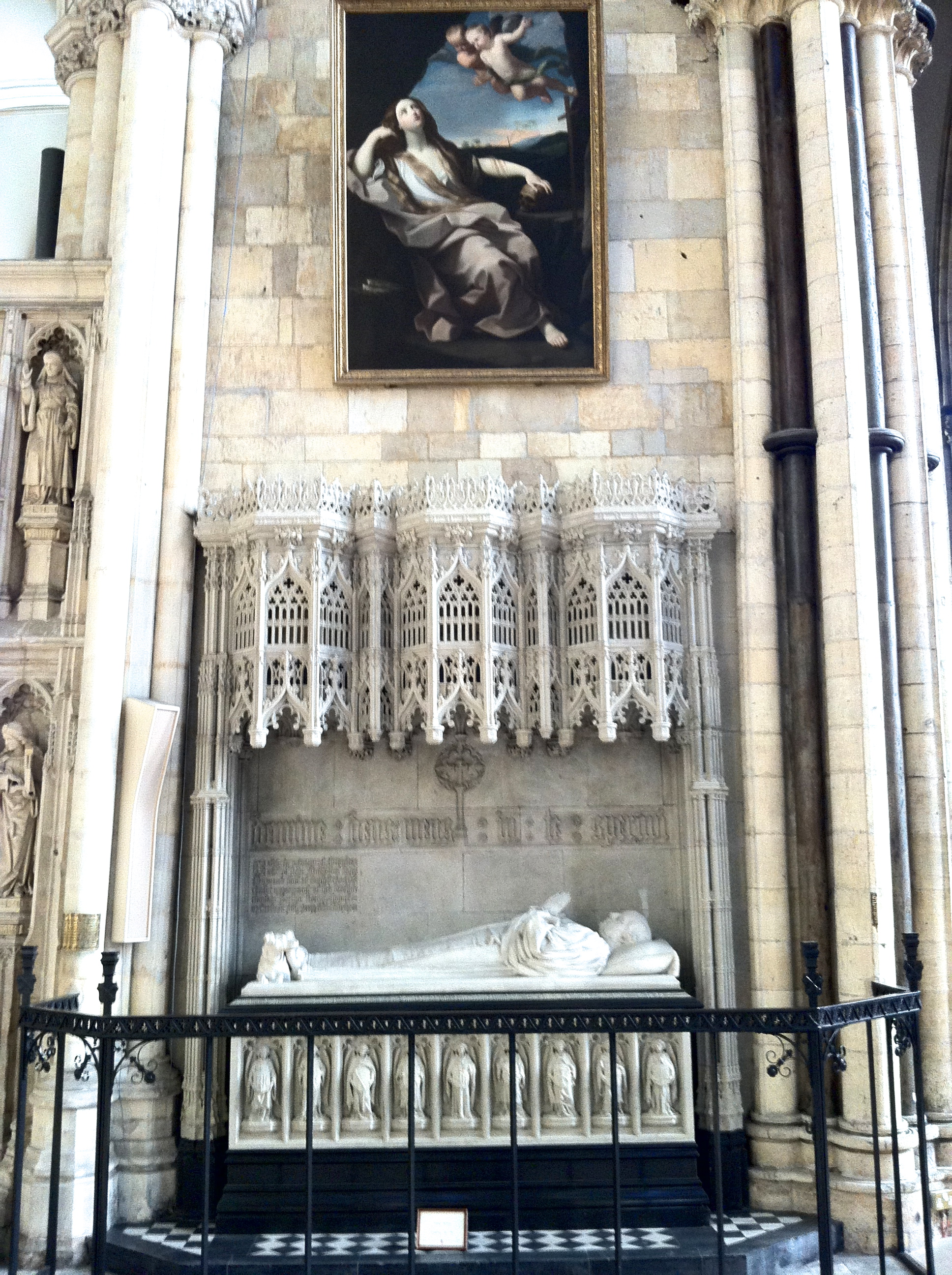
Memorial to Archbishop William Thomson (d. 1890) in the south transept at York Minster

William Thomson, FRS, FRGS (11 February 1819 – 25 December 1890) was an English church leader, Archbishop of York from 1862 until his death.

== Biography ==
=== Early life ===
He was born the eldest son of John Thompson [sic] of Kelswick House, near Whitehaven, Cumberland, and educated at Shrewsbury School and at The Queen's College, Oxford, of which he became a scholar. He took his B.A. degree in 1840, and was soon afterwards made fellow of his college. He was ordained in 1842, and worked as a curate at Cuddesdon. In 1847 he was made tutor of his college, and in 1853 he delivered the Bampton lectures, his subject being The Atoning Work of Christ viewed in Relation to some Ancient Theories. These lectures established his reputation.

=== Career ===
Thomson's activity was not confined to theology. He was made fellow of the Royal Society and the Royal Geographical Society. He also wrote a very popular Outline of the Laws of Thought (1842). He sided with the party at Oxford which favoured university reform, but this did not prevent him from being appointed provost of his college in 1855. In 1858 he was made preacher at Lincoln's Inn and a volume of his sermons was published in 1861. In the same year he edited Aids to Faith, a volume written in opposition to Essays and Reviews, the progressive sentiments of which had stirred up controversy in the Church of England.

In December 1861 he became Bishop of Gloucester and Bristol, and within a year he was elevated to Archbishop of York. In this position his moderate orthodoxy led him to join Archbishop Archibald Campbell Tait in supporting the Public Worship Regulation Act, and, as president of the northern convocation, he came frequently into sharp collision with the lower house of that body. But if he thus incurred the hostility of the High Church party among the clergy, he was admired by the laity for his strong sense, his clear and forcible reasoning, and his wide knowledge, and he remained to the last a power in the north of England. In his later years he published an address read before the members of the Royal Society of Edinburgh (1868), one on Design in Nature, for the Christian Evidence Society, which reached a fifth edition, various charges and pastoral addresses, and he was one of the projectors of the Speaker's Commentary, for which he wrote the "Introduction to the Synoptic Gospels."

See the Quarterly Review (April 1892).

== Family ==
His parents were John Thompson (sic, 1791–1878) and Isabella Thompson (–1847) On 24 July 1855 in Oxford, Thomson married Zoë Skene daughter of James Henry Skene (1812–), British Consul at Aleppo.

They had the following children:

- Ethel Zoë Thomson (1856–), who later edited Thomson's Life and Letters.
- Wilfred Forbes Home Thomson (1858–1939)
- Jocelyn Home Thomson (1859–1908)
- Sir Basil Home Thomson, KCB (21 April 1861 – 26 March 1939), a British intelligence officer, police officer, prison governor, colonial administrator, and writer
- Zoë Jane Thomson (1862–)
- Beatrice Mary Thomson (1864–)
- Alexandra Thomson (1867–1907). Married Col. John Studholme (10 February 1863 – 26 May 1934)
- Madeline Ita Mary Thomson (1880–)
- Bernard Henry Home Thomson (1874–1924), his granddaughter is the author Rose Tremain, and his great grandchildren are Rachael Daniel, Tamsin Daniel, Cléon Daniel, and Sebastian Daniel.

== Notes ==
Church of England titles
Preceded by Charles Baring	Bishop of Gloucester and Bristol; 1861–1862	Succeeded by Charles Ellicott
Preceded by Charles Longley	Archbishop of York; 1862–1890	Succeeded by William Connor Magee
