= Robert Craig Maclagan =

Scottish physician (1839–1919)

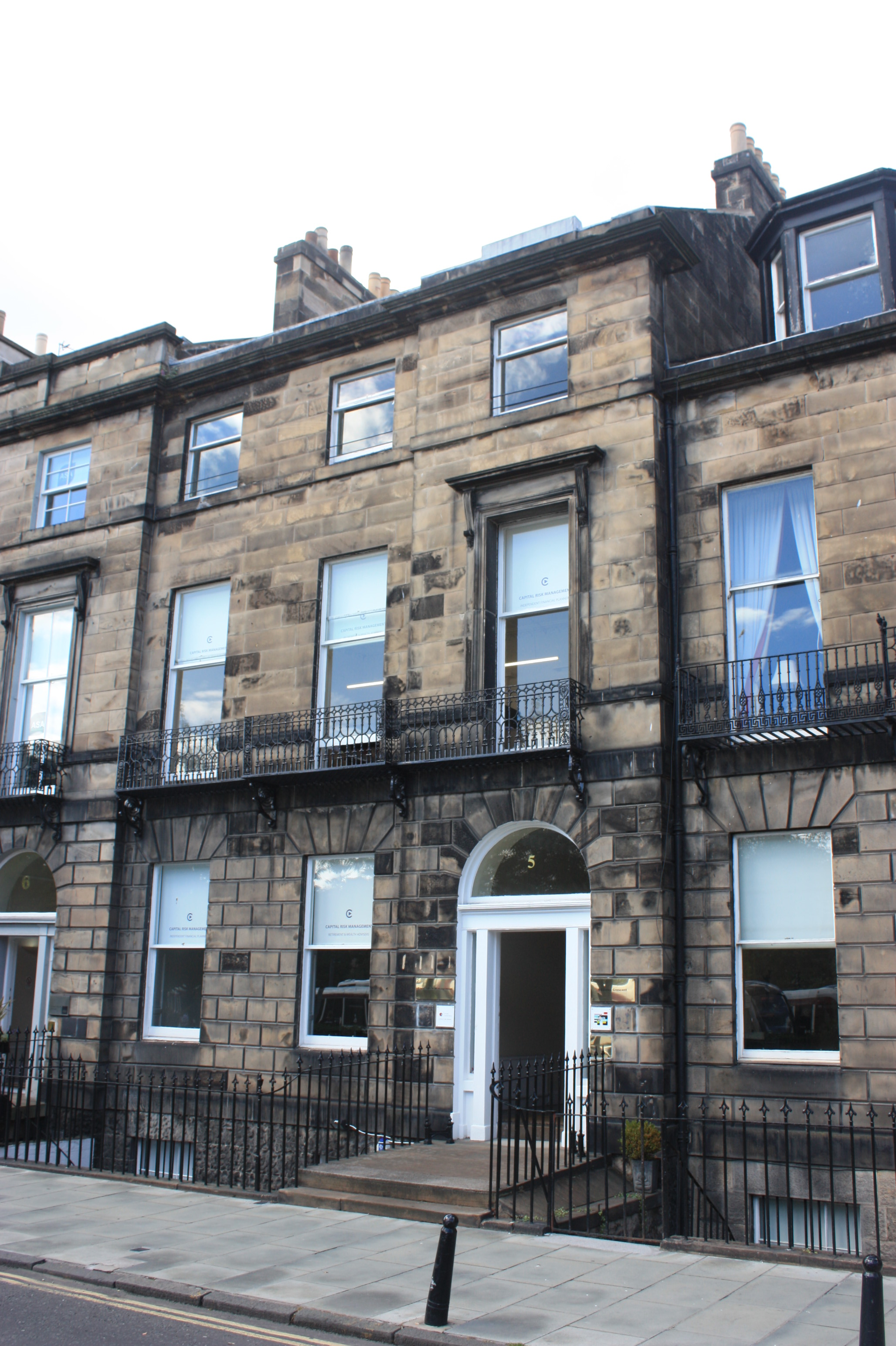
Maclagan's house at 5 Coates Crescent, Edinburgh

Dr Robert Craig Maclagan FRSE FRCPE (6 March 1839 – 12 July 1919) was a Scottish physician, anthropologist and author from the Maclagan family. He was co-founder of the Scottish Association for the Medical Education of Women.

== Life ==
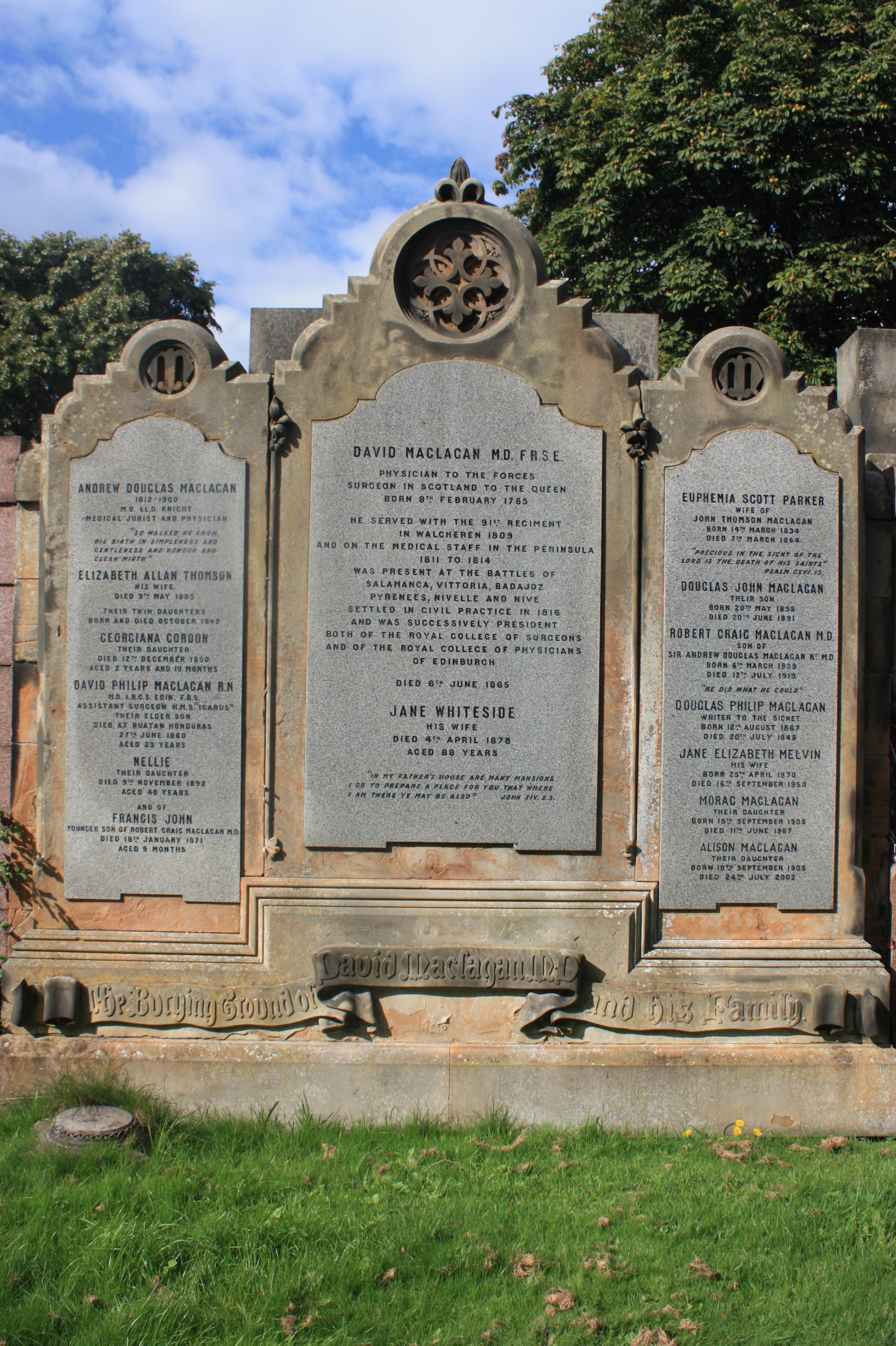
The Maclagan grave, Dean Cemetery, Edinburgh

He was born in Edinburgh on 6 March 1839 the son of Elizabeth Allan Thomson and her husband, Andrew Douglas Maclagan, a surgeon. He lived his early years at 129 George Street in Edinburgh's New Town. He was educated at the Edinburgh High School then studied medicine at the University of Edinburgh graduating with an MD in 1860.

In 1869 he was elected a Fellow of the Royal Society of Edinburgh his proposer being Sir Robert Christison.

Alongside his medical career he was a military volunteer and held the rank of Colonel with the 5th Battalion Royal Scots. In a further disconnected field (other than through writing) from 1873 he was Partner and Chairman of A. B. Fleming & Co, one of the world's largest ink manufactures, based in Granton in northern Edinburgh.

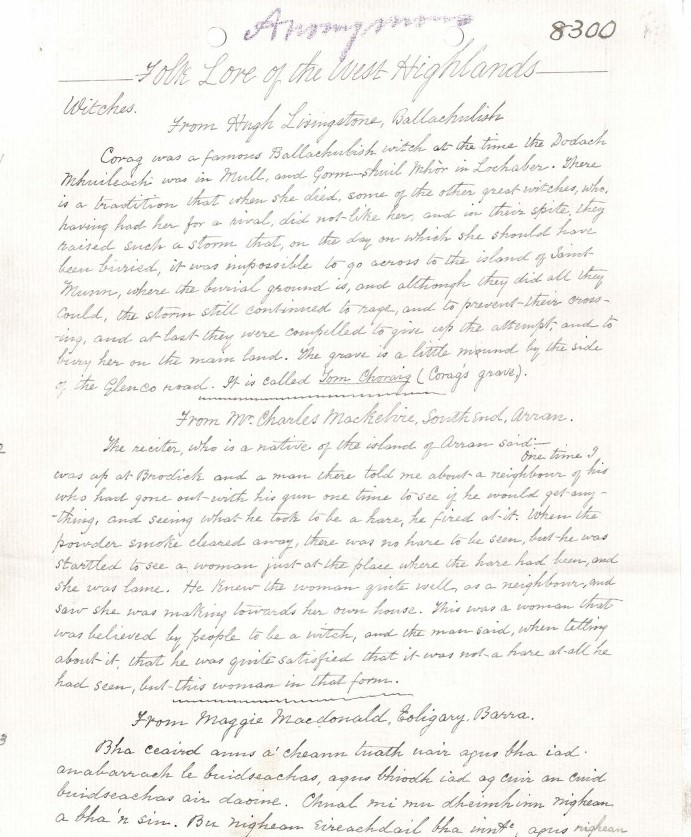
The fragment of Folklore of the West Highlands manuscript by Dr Robert Maclagan

He died on 12 July 1919 at home at 5 Coates Crescent in Edinburgh's West End, where he had lived for at least 40 years. He is buried with his family in Dean Cemetery in west Edinburgh. The grave lies on the north wall of the original cemetery, backing onto the first north extension.

== The Maclagan Manuscripts ==
The Maclagan Manuscripts is an important collection of folklore, customs and beliefs, which Robert Maclagan collected between the years 1893 and 1902. He worked in a team of dedicated collectors, in the West Highlands and they collected a huge amount of material, that covers topics as diverse as folk medicine, customs and beliefs, hero tales, material culture, rhymes and children's games, recipes and weather lore, place-name legends, the natural world and much more. Dr Robert Craig Maclagan published some of the material in a number of articles and books. The manuscript itself totals more than 9000 pages and is held in the University of Edinburgh School of Scottish Studies Archive. Some of the manuscripts have been digitized and are available to view online. The collection he amassed is significant because it gives us a window into the life of men and women in the 19th century in the Highlands of Scotland.

== Publications ==
- The Arsenic Eaters of Styria (BMJ 1864)
- The Clan of the Bell of St Fillan (1879)
- Scottish Myths (1882)
- The Games and Diversions of Argyleshire (1901)
- Evil Eye in the Western Highlands (1902)
- Our Ancestors: Scots, Picts and Cymry (1913)
- Religio Scotica

== Family ==
He was father to Douglas Philip Maclagan WS (1867–1948).
