= Chewton Mendip =

Village and civil parish in Somerset, England

Coordinates: 51.2755°N 2.5770°W

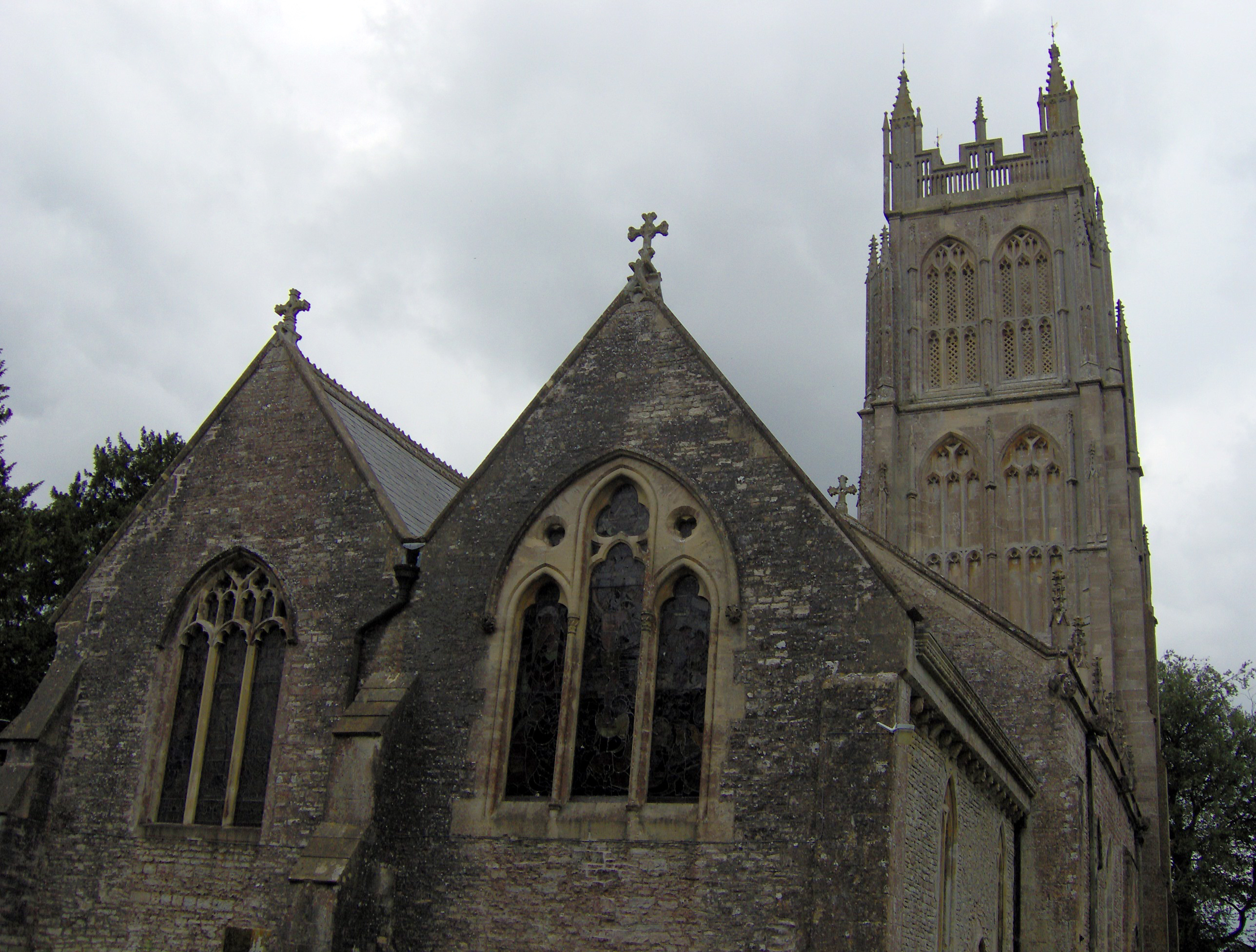
- Church of St Mary Magdalene, Chewton Mendip

- Location within Somerset
- Population: 585 (2011)
- OS grid reference: ST597531
- Unitary authority: Somerset Council
- Ceremonial county: Somerset
- Region: South West
- Country: England
- Sovereign state: United Kingdom
- Post town: RADSTOCK
- Postcode district: BA3
- Dialling code: 01761
- Police: Avon and Somerset
- Fire: Devon and Somerset
- Ambulance: South Western
- UK Parliament: Wells and Mendip Hills

Chewton Mendip is a village and civil parish in Somerset, England. It is situated 4 miles (6 km) north of Wells, 16 miles (26 km) south of Bath and Bristol on the A39 very close to the A37. The village is in a valley on the Mendip Hills, is the source of the River Chew and is therefore on the edge of the Chew Valley. The parish includes the hamlets of Bathway and Green Ore.

== History ==
There were several lead mines and stone quarries in the parish. It is also the site of Attborough Swallet (also known as Red Quar Swallet), a cave which is unusual for a cave on the Mendip Hills in that it is not in limestone but instead in Dolomitic Conglomerate and Marl. The cave was first entered in 1992.

There is a long barrow to the north of the village 100 ft (30 m) by 50 ft (15 m). Excavation in 1946 revealed six Bronze Age barrows below the crest of the Mendips. The shape of some of the existing fields suggests they are of medieval origin.

The parish was part of the hundred of Chewton.

The Bristol cartographer, James Millerd (c.1637-1715) was from the parish, the son of the local husbandman (tenant farmer), William 'Millard'.

On 12 June 1643 the village was the site of a skirmish in the English Civil War, between Royalist forces led by Robert Dormer, 1st Earl of Carnarvon and the parliamentary forces under William Waller including the cavalry unit of Sir Arthur Haselrig known as Haselrig's lobsters.

The village used to have a Gothic style mansion built for the Waldegrave family before 1791, however all that remains is an 18th-century lodge. The Waldegrave Estate still operates from an office in converted farm buildings in a small business park found on the southern edge of Chewton Mendip. Other companies include 'Bathroom Engineering' (an international manufacturer & distributor of bathroom & shower products), and The Mendip Cheese Company (a cheese supplier).

The Mendip Engineering Company Ltd was based in Chewton Mendip around the time of World War I. It was founded in the early 19th century as Cutler's Green Ironworks and supplied the British Army with swords. By the 19th century they were repairing farm machinery and casting drain covers and road signs. By the start of the 20th century the company was controlled by C.W. Harris and trading as the Mendip Engineering Company. C.W. Harris designed and built steam lorries in 1907/8 that were sold as Mendips; in 1911 petrol engine vans were added to the range. W.L. Adams was employed to design an engine and by 1913 had built a four-cylinder unit suitable for Cyclecars. In March 1914 Harris announced a Light Car completely made by the company; this was sold up to 1916 when war intervened. After World War I the company moved to Southmead Road in Bristol, and was later taken over by Baines Manufacturing Company Ltd of Westbury-on-Trym. Although more than 300 cars were built, only one, incomplete, Mendip car survives, having been dug out of a hedge at Cookham near Marlow, Buckinghamshire in 1967.

In 2004 there was a proposal to build a wind turbine near Chewton Mendip but it was eventually turned down by Mendip District Council. There was particular concern about the effect the wind turbine would have on the Mendip Hills AONB (Area of Outstanding Natural Beauty). That decision was appealed against and was considered at a public inquiry in 2006, at which Ecotricity was given the go-ahead to build the turbine. The planned 2 MW turbine was built at Shooters Bottom Farm (grid reference ST595503). It has three 35 metres (115 ft) blades rotating at 6–22 rpm around a 65 metres (213 ft) high hub. It is expected to produce an average of 6.7MWh (megawatt hours) of electricity per year from the 2MW generator, enough to power up to 2,000 homes in the area.

== Governance ==
Chewton Mendip has its own parish council which has responsibility for local issues, including setting an annual precept (local rate) to cover the council's operating costs and producing annual accounts for public scrutiny. The parish council evaluates local planning applications and works with the local police, district council officers, and neighbourhood watch groups on matters of crime, security, and traffic. The parish council's role also includes initiating projects for the maintenance and repair of parish facilities, as well as consulting with the district council on the maintenance, repair, and improvement of highways, drainage, footpaths, public transport, and street cleaning. Conservation matters (including trees and listed buildings) and environmental issues are also the responsibility of the council.

For local government purposes, since 1 April 2023, the parish comes under the unitary authority of Somerset Council. Prior to this, it was part of the non-metropolitan district of Mendip (established under the Local Government Act 1972). It was part of Wells Rural District before 1974.

The village falls within the 'Chewton Mendip and Ston Easton' electoral ward. The ward starts in Ston Easton, passes westwards to Chewton Mendip and then continues west to Charterhouse. The total ward population as at the 2011 census was 2,147.

It is also part of the Wells and Mendip Hills county constituency represented in the House of Commons of the Parliament of the United Kingdom. It elects one Member of Parliament (MP) by the first past the post system of election.

== Geography ==
Chewton Mendip is within the Mendip Hills Area of Outstanding Natural Beauty and the Chew Valley.

The Monarch's Way long-distance footpath follows the route taken by Charles II after his defeat at the Battle of Worcester in 1651. The route enters Somerset near Chewton Mendip and crosses the Mendip Hills heading for Wells.

=== Climate ===
Along with the rest of South West England, Chewton Mendip has a temperate climate which is generally wetter and milder than the rest of the country. The annual mean temperature is approximately 10 °C (50.0 °F). Seasonal temperature variation is less extreme than most of the United Kingdom because of the adjacent sea temperatures. The summer months of July and August are the warmest with mean daily maxima of approximately 21 °C (69.8 °F). In winter mean minimum temperatures of 1 °C (33.8 °F) or 2 °C (35.6 °F) are common. In the summer the Azores high pressure affects the south-west of England, however convective cloud sometimes forms inland, reducing the number of hours of sunshine. Annual sunshine rates are slightly less than the regional average of 1,600 hours. In December 1998 there were 20 days without sun recorded at Yeovilton. Most of the rainfall in the south-west is caused by Atlantic depressions or by convection. In summer, a large proportion of the rainfall is caused by sun heating the ground leading to convection and to showers and thunderstorms. Average rainfall is around 700 mm (28 in). About 8–15 days of snowfall is typical. November to March have the highest mean wind speeds, and June to August have the lightest winds. The predominant wind direction is from the south-west.

== Demographics ==
According to the 2001 Census the Nedge Ward (which includes Litton) had 2,074 residents in 893 households, with an average age of 40.0 years. 78% of residents described their health as 'good', 18% of 16- to 74-year-olds had no qualifications and the area had an unemployment rate of 1.8% of all economically active people aged 16–74. In the Index of Multiple Deprivation 2004 it was ranked 26,803 out of 32,482 wards in England, where 1 was the most deprived LSOA and 32,482 the least deprived.

== Church ==
The church, dedicated to St Mary Magdalene, is made of Lias Stone, with a tower 126 feet (38 m) of Doulting Stone which was "unfinished" in 1541. The tower contains a bell dating from 1753 and made by Thomas Bilbie of the Bilbie family. In addition, there is a peal of eight bells by Taylor's of Loughborough. The church, which was started in 1441 by Carthusian monks, incorporates several Norman features including the north doorway. The register commences in the year 560. Near the altar is a stone seat, known as a 'frid' for those, especially criminals, who took sanctuary in the church. The church includes monuments to Sir Henry Fitzroger and his wife who died in 1388, and to Frances, Lady Waldegrave (1879). The Waldegrave family have owned Chewton from 1553, but did not live in the village until the 1860s. It is a Grade II listed building. A stone cross in the churchyard also has listed building status.

Wade and Wade in their 1929 book "Somerset" described the church as a "singularly interesting church, which possesses one of the most stately towers in the county".

Their description continued "The arrangement of double belfry windows in the two upper stages is unusual, and the conventional lines of the elaborately pierced parapet above are relieved by the projecting stair turret and spirelet. The general effect is rich and impressive. The figure of our Lord, surrounded by four pairs of adoring angels, over the W. doorway should also be observed (cp. Batcombe). In the body of the church note should be taken of the good Norm. doorway forming the N. entrance. The interior is remarkable for an ugly bit of mediaeval vandalism. To render the altar observable from all parts of the church, a Norm. triplet, which once formed the chancel arch, has been mutilated; a pointed arch has been inserted, and the corner of the S. wall pared away. The chancel contains the only extant specimen in Somerset of a frid stool, a rough seat let into the sill of the N. window of the sacrarium for the accommodation of anyone claiming sanctuary. Note (1) piscinas of different dates in chancel; (2) change of design in arcading of nave, showing subsequent lengthening of church — the earlier columns stand on Norm. bases; (3) rood-loft doorway and ancient pulpit stairs near modern pulpit; (4) Jacobean lectern and Bible of 1611. The "Bonville" chantry, S. of chancel, contains a 15th-cent. altar-tomb with recumbent effigies of Sir H. Fitzroger and wife, and a modern mural tablet with medallion to Viscountess Waldegrave. In the churchyard is a weather-worn but fine cross, with a canopied crucifix. The Communion plate is pre-Reformation, dating from 1511."

== Other Grade II listed buildings ==
- Historic England. "Rookery Farmhouse at Images of England (1177443)". National Heritage List for England.
- Historic England. "Sperrings Green Farmhouse at Images of England (1058647)". National Heritage List for England.
- Historic England. "Woodside at Images of England (1307448)". National Heritage List for England.
- Historic England. "Chewton Hill House at Images of England (1177449)". National Heritage List for England.
- Historic England. "The Old Rectory at Images of England (1058648)". National Heritage List for England.
- Historic England. "Lime Kiln at NGR ST 6016 5285 at Images of England (1058649)". National Heritage List for England.
- Historic England. "Barn on roadside at Dudwell Field Farmhouse at Images of England (1345099)". National Heritage List for England.
- Historic England. "Dudwell Field Farmhouse at Images of England (1177457)". National Heritage List for England.
- Historic England. "Old East End Cottages at Images of England (1177463)". National Heritage List for England.
- Historic England. "Nos 1, 2, 3 and The Old Post Office II Row of 4 houses at Images of England (1058611)". National Heritage List for England.
- Historic England. "Chewton House at Images of England (1177470)". National Heritage List for England.
- Historic England. "Manor Farmhouse at Images of England (1058652)". National Heritage List for England.
- Historic England. "The Vicarage at Images of England (1058612)". National Heritage List for England.
- Historic England. "Spring Cottage and Yew Tree Cottage at Images of England (1058613)". National Heritage List for England.
- Historic England. "Everards Farmhouse at Images of England (1058614)". National Heritage List for England.
- Historic England. "Bathway Cottages at Images of England (1058646)". National Heritage List for England.
- Historic England. "Former parish boundary stone at NGR ST 6093 5366 at Images of England (1058615)". National Heritage List for England.
- Historic England. "No 34 at Images of England (1058650)". National Heritage List for England.
- Historic England. "No 35 and Ruby Cottage at Images of England (1177469)". National Heritage List for England.
- Historic England. "Double House Farmhouse at Images of England (1345135)". National Heritage List for England.
- Historic England. "Ford House at Images of England (1058651)". National Heritage List for England.
- Historic England. "Old Ford Farmhouse at Images of England (1345100)". National Heritage List for England.
- Historic England. "Post Office at Images of England (1307445)". National Heritage List for England.
- Historic England. "Prior Lodge at Images of England (1345136)". National Heritage List for England.

== Notable people ==
- Peter Denning (cricketer)
- Waldegrave family
- William Waldegrave, Baron Waldegrave of North Hill
- Caroline Waldegrave, Baroness Waldegrave of North Hill
- Susan Hussey, Baroness Hussey of North Bradley
- James Waldegrave, 1st Earl Waldegrave
- James Waldegrave, 2nd Earl Waldegrave
- John Waldegrave, 3rd Earl Waldegrave
- George Waldegrave, 4th Earl Waldegrave
- George Waldegrave, 5th Earl Waldegrave
- John James Waldegrave, 6th Earl Waldegrave
- George Edward Waldegrave, 7th Earl Waldegrave
- William Waldegrave, 8th Earl Waldegrave
- William Waldegrave, Viscount Chewton
- William Frederick Waldegrave, 9th Earl Waldegrave
- William Waldegrave, 10th Earl Waldegrave
- Henry Noel Waldegrave, 11th Earl Waldegrave
- Geoffrey Noel Waldegrave, 12th Earl Waldegrave
- James Sherbrooke Waldegrave, 13th Earl Waldegrave
