= William Waldegrave =

William Waldegrave may refer to:

- Sir William Waldegrave (Suffolk MP, died 1554), MP for Suffolk, 1545
- Sir William Waldegrave (Suffolk MP, died 1613) (c.1540–1613), MP for Suffolk, 1563
- William Waldegrave (physician) (fl. 1689), English physician
- William Waldegrave, 1st Baron Radstock (1753–1825), Royal Navy admiral and Governor of Newfoundland
- William Waldegrave, 8th Earl Waldegrave (1788–1859), Royal Navy vice-admiral
- William Waldegrave, Viscount Chewton (1816–1854), British Army officer, son of the above
- William Waldegrave, 9th Earl Waldegrave (1851–1930), British politician, son of the above
- William Waldegrave, 10th Earl Waldegrave (1882–1933), British peer, son of the above
- William Waldegrave, Baron Waldegrave of North Hill (born 1946), British politician
