= Waldegrave family =

English family

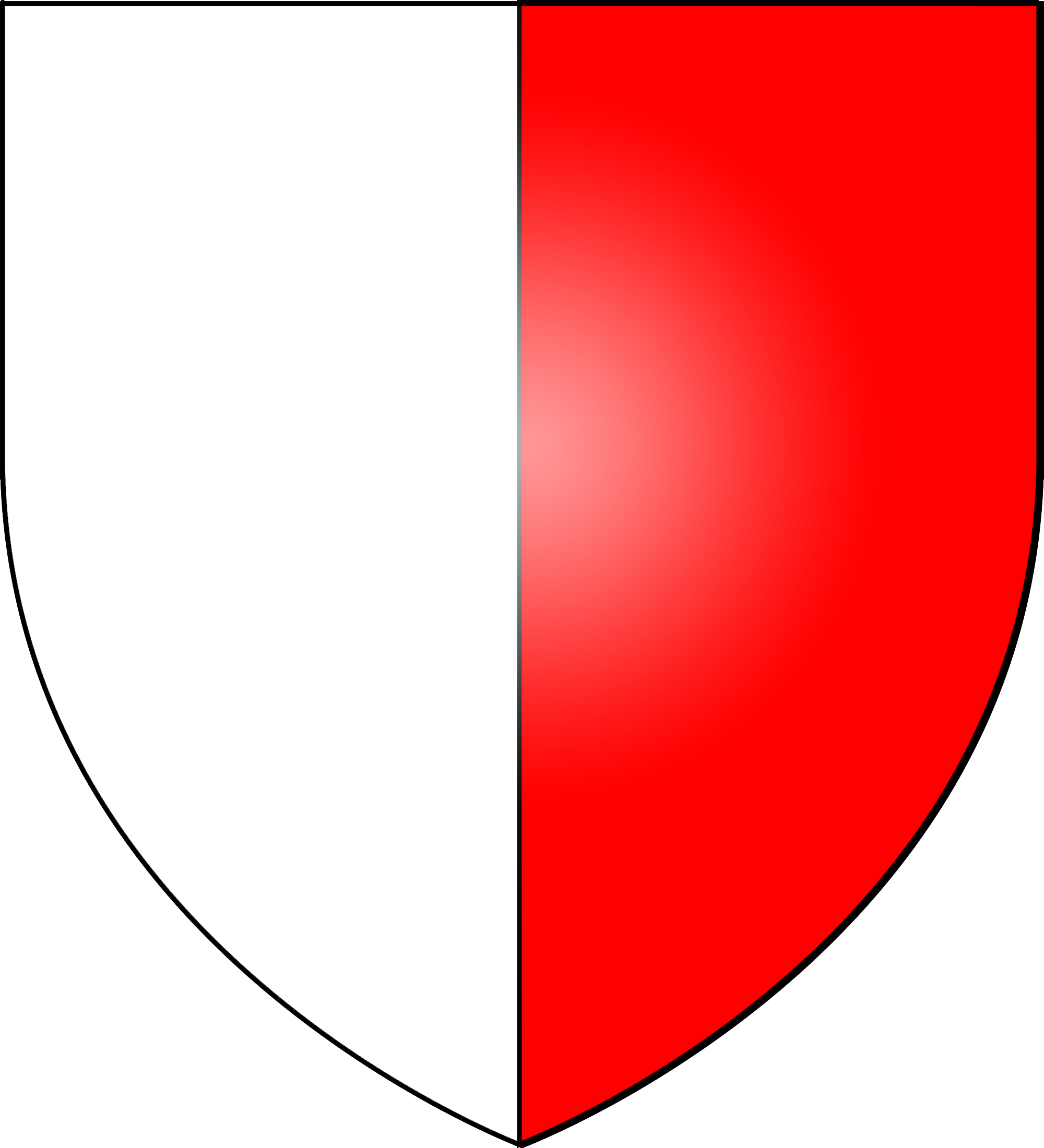
Coat of arms of Waldegrave: Per pale argent and gules.

Waldegrave /ˈwɔːlɡreɪv/ is the name of an English family, said to derive from Walgrave in Northamptonshire, who long held the manor of Smallbridge in Bures St. Mary, Suffolk.

== History ==
Sir Richard Waldegrave served as a Knight of the Shire in 1339 in Lincolnshire. He married Agnes Daubeny and they had one child, Sir Richard Waldegrave.

Sir Richard Waldegrave (or Walgrave), Knt., of Smallbridge, Suffolk, (died 2 May 1410), was member of parliament for Lincolnshire in 1335, and Speaker of the House of Commons in the reign of King Richard II; his son, Sir Richard Waldegrave, Knt., (died 2 May 1434), styled Lord of Bures and Silvesters, was the victor of Conquet and the Isle of Rhé in Brittany in 1402.

Sir William Waldegrave (c. 1415–1461), was born in Smallbridge. He married Joane Doreward and they had two sons—Sir Thomas Waldegrave, and Richard Waldegrave.

One of Sir Richard's descendants was Sir Edward Waldegrave (c. 1517 – 1 September 1561) of Borley, Essex, and West Haddon, Northamptonshire, who was imprisoned during the reign of King Edward VI for his loyalty to the princess, afterwards Queen Mary I. By Mary he was knighted, and he received from her the manor of Chewton in Somerset, now the residence of Earl Waldegrave. He was a member of parliament and Chancellor of the Duchy of Lancaster. After Mary's decease he suffered a reverse of fortune, and he was a prisoner in the Tower of London when he died on 1 September 1561.

Sir Edward's descendant, another Sir Edward Waldegrave was created a baronet in 1643 for his services to King Charles I; and his descendant, Sir Henry Waldegrave, Bart. (1661 – 24 January 1689), was created Baron Waldegrave, of Chewton in 1686. Sir Henry married Henrietta FitzJames (1667 – 3 April 1730), daughter of King James II by his mistress Arabella Churchill; their son was James Waldegrave, 1st Earl Waldegrave (1684–1741).

Educated in France, James Waldegrave soon crossed over to England, and under King George I he declared himself a Protestant and took his seat as Baron Waldegrave in the House of Lords. Having become friendly with Sir Robert Walpole, he was sent to Paris as ambassador extraordinary in 1725, and from 1727 to 1730 he was British ambassador at Vienna. In 1729 he was created Viscount Chewton and Earl Waldegrave, and in 1730 he succeeded Sir Horatio Walpole as ambassador in Paris, filling this post during ten very difficult years. He died in April 1741. Much of his diplomatic correspondence is in the British Museum.

His son James, the 2nd earl (1715–1763), was perhaps the most intimate friend of King George II, and was for a time governor of his grandson, the future King George III. He was very much in evidence during the critical years 1755–1757, when the king employed him to negotiate in turn with Newcastle, Devonshire, Pitt and Fox about the formation of a ministry. Eventually, in consequence of a deadlock, Waldegrave himself was First Lord of the Treasury for five days in June 1757. He died on 28 April 1763, leaving some valuable and interesting Memoirs, which were published in 1821.

His brother John, the 3rd earl (1718–1784), was a soldier, who distinguished himself especially at the Battle of Minden and became a general in 1772. He was a member of parliament from 1747 to 1763.

His younger son, William (1753–1825), entered the British navy in 1766, and after many years of service was third in command at the Battle of Cape St Vincent in 1797. In 1800 he was created an Irish peer as Baron Radstock, and in 1802 he became an admiral. His son, Granville George (1786–1857), followed in his father's footsteps, and was made a vice-admiral in 1851. In 1857 his son, Granville Augustus William (born 1833), became 3rd Baron Radstock, settling at the Mayfield estate in Woolston and undertaking missionary work in Russia

George Waldegrave, 4th Earl Waldegrave (1751–1789), the eldest son of the 3rd earl, was a soldier and a member of parliament. His sons, George (1784–1794) and John James (1785–1835), were the 5th and 6th earls.

In 1797 the 6th earl inherited from Horace Walpole his famous residence, Strawberry Hill, Twickenham (hence the name of Waldegrave Road, which connects Strawberry Hill with Teddington), but his son, George Edward, the 7th earl (1816–1846), was obliged in 1842 to sell the valuable treasures collected there. His wife, Frances, Countess Waldegrave (1821–1879), a daughter of the singer John Braham, was a prominent figure in society. He was her second husband, and after his death she married George Granville Vernon Harcourt of Nuneham Park, Oxfordshire, and later Chichester Parkinson-Fortescue, 1st Baron Carlingford.

The 7th earl was succeeded by his uncle William (1788–1859), a son of the 4th earl, and in 1859 William's grandson, William Frederick (1851–1930), became the 9th earl.

== See also ==
- Smallbridge Hall
