= Marmaduke Hussey, Baron Hussey of North Bradley =

British television executive (1923–2006)

The Right Honourable The Lord Hussey of North Bradley

Member of the House of Lords
- Lord Temporal
- Life peerage 11 September 1996 – 27 December 2006

Personal details
- Born: Marmaduke James Hussey; 29 August 1923
- Died: 27 December 2006 (aged 83)
- Spouse: Lady Susan Waldegrave (m. 1959)
- Children: 2 (including Katharine)
- Parents: Eric Hussey; Christine Elizabeth Morley
- Relatives: The 13th Earl Waldegrave (brother-in-law); The Baron Waldegrave of North Hill (brother-in-law)
- Education: Rugby School, Trinity College
- Alma mater: Trinity College, Oxford
- Occupation: Chairman of the Board of Governors of the BBC

Marmaduke James Hussey, Baron Hussey of North Bradley (29 August 1923 – 27 December 2006), known as Duke Hussey, was Chairman of the Board of Governors of the BBC from 1986 to 1996, serving two terms in that role.

== Early life ==
The son of the athlete and colonial administrator Eric Hussey and his wife, Christine Elizabeth Morley, Marmaduke Hussey was educated at Rugby School and Trinity College, Oxford. He served in the Grenadier Guards in the Second World War and was severely injured and captured at Anzio, having to have a leg amputated while a prisoner-of-war, which resulted in his repatriation.

== Career ==
After returning to civilian life, Hussey joined Associated Newspapers, where he had a long career, culminating in being appointed managing director. He subsequently joined Times Newspapers as chief executive and managing director, a post he held from 1971 to 1980.

In 1986 he was appointed as Chairman of the BBC, upon the death of Stuart Young, thanks in part to his close connections to the ruling Conservatives.

Within three months of joining the BBC, Hussey had forced the resignation of the Director-General, Alasdair Milne, following a series of rows in recent years between the BBC and the Conservative government. Michael Checkland served in the position for the next five years, and in 1992, Hussey appointed John Birt as Director-General but fell out with him over his management style and Panorama's controversial interview with Diana, Princess of Wales in 1995, later commenting that Birt had been his "greatest mistake".

Hussey retired from the BBC in 1996, and on 11 September 1996 was made a life peer as Baron Hussey of North Bradley in the County of Wiltshire, taking a seat in the House of Lords.

Hussey gave up several boardroom appointments when he joined the BBC, but he remained chairman of the board of the Royal Marsden Hospital until 1998.

== Personal life and death ==
On 25 April 1959, Hussey married Lady Susan Waldegrave, youngest daughter of the 12th Earl Waldegrave. She was a Woman of the Bedchamber to Elizabeth II and is a godmother to William, Prince of Wales. They had two children: James Arthur (b. 1961) and Katharine Elizabeth (b. 1964). His daughter Katharine married Sir Francis Brooke Bt. and followed her mother into royal service, as one of the official Queen's Companions to Queen Camilla.

Hussey of North Bradley died aged 83, on 27 December 2006.

== In popular culture ==
Hussey is known as 'Marmalade Gusset' in the satirical magazine Private Eye. Hussey is portrayed by Richard Cordery in season 5 of The Crown.

In episode two of the satirical news and current affairs show The Day Today, a video of Hussey is shown during the opening credits with the audio narration 'and where now for man raised by puffins?'

== Arms ==
Coat of arms of Marmaduke Hussey, Baron Hussey of North Bradley
Crest A greyhound sejant sable grasping in the dexter paw a caduceus or. Escutcheon Argent on three bars sable five crowns in cross or. Supporters On either side a hind argent unguled and gorged with a collar or pendent therefrom by a string sable a bugle horn or virolled and stringed sable. Motto Malevolis Resiste

Media offices
Preceded by Stuart Young	Chairman of the BBC Board of Governors; 1986 – 1996	Succeeded by Christopher Bland
