= Edward Waldegrave (disambiguation) =

Edward Waldegrave (c.1516-1561) was an English courtier.

Edward Waldegrave may also refer to:

- Sir Edward Waldegrave, 1st Baronet (c. 1568 – c. 1650), Royalist soldier
- Edward Waldegrave (MP for Sudbury) (c.1556-1622), represented Sudbury (UK Parliament constituency)
