= Katharine, Lady Brooke =

British courtier (born 1964)

The Honourable Lady Brooke
- Born: Katharine Elizabeth Hussey; 1964 (age 61–62)
- Spouse: Sir Francis George Windham Brooke, 4th Baronet
- Children: 3
- Parent(s): Marmaduke Hussey, Baron Hussey of North Bradley; Lady Susan Waldegrave

Katharine Elizabeth, Lady Brooke (née Hussey; born 1964) is a British aristocrat and courtier. Since 2022, she has served in the Royal Household of the United Kingdom as a Queen's companion to Queen Camilla.

== Early life and family ==
Lady Brooke was born Katharine Elizabeth Hussey in 1964 to Marmaduke Hussey, son of Eric Hussey, and Lady Susan Hussey, daughter of Geoffrey Waldegrave, 12th Earl Waldegrave. Her mother served as a lady-in-waiting to Queen Elizabeth II. Her father was created a life peer, as Baron Hussey of North Bradley, on 11 September 1996, thus entitling her to the style The Honourable Katherine Hussey.

== Member of the Royal Household ==
Lady Brooke followed her mother into royal service, as one of the official Queen's Companions to Queen Camilla. She was appointed to the British royal household in 2022. She accompanied the queen during the coronation of King Charles III and Queen Camilla on 6 May 2023.

== Personal life ==
She married Sir Francis George Windham Brooke, 4th Baronet of Summerton. They have three children.
