= Henry Waldegrave =

Henry Waldegrave may refer to:

- Henry Waldegrave, 1st Baron Waldegrave (1661–1689), English peer and Jacobite supporter
- Henry Waldegrave, 11th Earl Waldegrave (1854–1936), British peer and priest
