= Chidiock =

Chidiock is a given name. Notable people with the name include:

- Chidiock Paulet (by 1521–1574), English politician
- Chidiock Tichborne (c. 1562–1586), English conspirator and poet
