= William Waldegrave, Viscount Chewton =

British army officer

The Right Honourable The Viscount Chewton
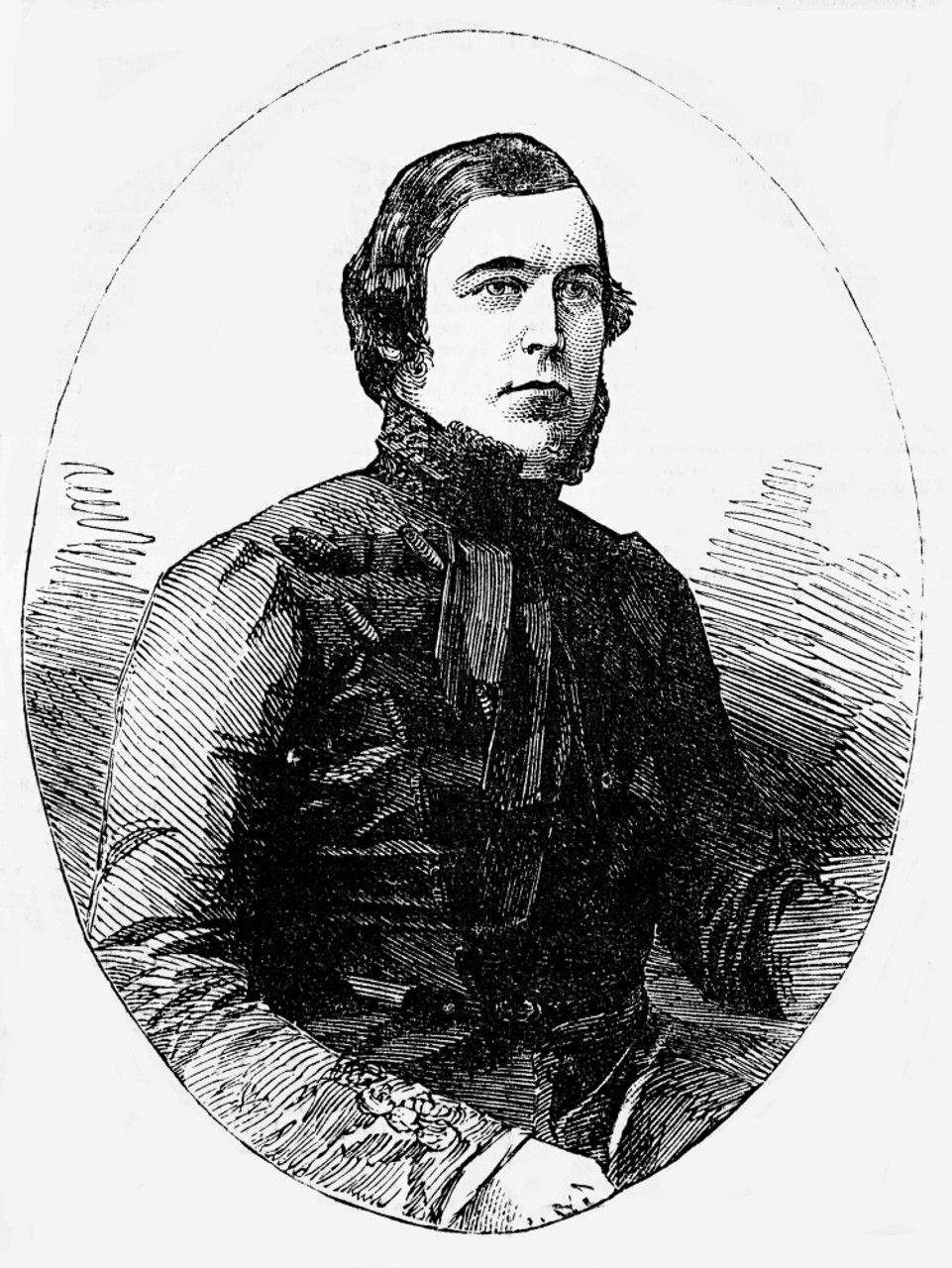
- Born: 29 June 1816; Cardington, England
- Died: 8 October 1854 (aged 38); Selimiye Barracks, Ottoman Empire
- Burial place: British Burial Ground, Scutari
- Education: Cheam School; Trinity College, Cambridge
- Spouse: Frances Bastard (m. 1850–1854)
- Military career
- Allegiance: United Kingdom
- Branch: British Army
- Service years: 1838–1854
- Rank: Captain
- Units: 3rd Regiment of Foot; 53rd Regiment of Foot; 6th Regiment of Foot; Scots Fusilier Guards
- Conflicts: Rebellions of 1837–1838; First Anglo-Sikh War; Battle of Sobraon; Crimean War; Battle of the Alma (DOW)

Captain William Frederick Waldegrave, Viscount Chewton (29 June 1816 – 8 October 1854) was a British Army officer. He died of wounds received in the Crimean War.

== Early life and education ==
William Waldegrave was born on 29 June 1816 in Cardington, Bedfordshire. Waldegrave was the eldest son of William Waldegrave, 8th Earl Waldegrave and was educated at Cheam School. While still at school, he served as a midshipman aboard his father's ship, HMS Seringapatam from 1829–31 and later graduated from Trinity College, Cambridge in 1837.

In 1846, his father inherited the earldom from his nephew George Waldegrave, 7th Earl Waldegrave and Waldegrave took the courtesy title Viscount Chewton.

== Military career ==
Chewton emigrated to Canada and served with the militia which put down the rebellions of 1837. He returned to Britain in 1843 and served with the British Army.

In 1846, Chewton fought in the Battle of Sobraon and then captained the 6th Regiment of Foot stationed at the Cape of Good Hope in 1847 and then the Royal Scots Fusiliers in Scotland in 1848. Chewton later fought in the Battle of Alma in September 1854, but died of his wounds a few weeks later.

== Marriage and children ==
Chewton was married on 2 July 1850 to Frances Bastard, daughter of Captain John Bastard of Sharpham, Devon. They had three children:

- A daughter who died in infancy in 1851.
- William Frederick Waldegrave, 9th Earl Waldegrave (born 2 March 1851, died 12 August 1930), father of William Waldegrave, 10th Earl Waldegrave
- The Reverend Henry Noel Waldegrave, 11th Earl Waldegrave (born 14 October 1854, died 30 December 1936), father of Geoffrey Waldegrave, 12th Earl Waldegrave

Frances, Viscountess Chewton was a Woman of the Bedchamber to Queen Victoria and received the Order of Victoria and Albert, 3rd class. She died 11 April 1902, at Bookham Lodge, Cobham, Surrey, in her 80th year, of pneumonia.
