= Mary Waldegrave, Countess Waldegrave =

Mary Waldegrave, Countess Waldegrave, DBE (née Mary Dorothea Palmer; 25 March 1850 – 8 November 1933) was a British peeress.

== Biography ==
She was the daughter of Roundell Palmer (later Earl of Selborne) and his wife, Laura, a daughter of the 8th Earl Waldegrave. She was known to family and friends as "May".

On 5 August 1874, she married her first cousin, William Waldegrave, 9th Earl Waldegrave. Lord and Lady Waldegrave had three children:

- Lady Mary Wilfreda (1875–1947)
- Lady Laura Margaret (1880–1959)
- William Edward Seymour, later 10th Earl Waldegrave (1882–1933)

In the 1918 Birthday Honours, Mary Waldegrave, Countess Waldegrave, was appointed a DBE for her work as Deputy President of the Somerset branch of the British Red Cross Society during World War I.
