= William Waldegrave (Suffolk MP, died 1554) =

English soldier and Member of Parliament

Sir William Waldegrave
- Born: 2 August 1507; Smallbridge, Suffolk
- Died: 2 May 1554 (aged 46); Calais, English occupied France
- Spouse: Juliana Raynsford
- Children: Dorothy Waldegrave; Margaret Waldegrave; Mary Waldegrave; William Waldegrave
- Parent(s): Sir George Waldegrave, Anne Drury

Sir William Waldegrave (2 August 1507 – 2 May 1554) was an English soldier and Member of Parliament.

== Life ==
Waldegrave was born into a prosperous Suffolk family, the eldest son of Sir George Waldegrave of Smallbridge Hall, Bures St Mary, Suffolk and Anne Drury, the daughter of Sir Robert Drury of Hawstead, Suffolk. He was brought up at his maternal grandfather's house. The deaths within the space of 14 months of his paternal grandfather, Sir William Waldegrave, and his own father left him heir to a large estate and fortune at the age of 20. While on his deathbed, his father secured for Waldegrave an advantageous marriage to a Suffolk heiress.

After inheriting the family estate, Waldegrave combined local administration with attendance at court and military service. He was knighted by Henry VIII at the coronation of Anne Boleyn, and headed the commission to take the Oath of Succession in Suffolk. He was known for his loyalty to the Crown and in the autumn of 1536 he was one of a group of men whom Thomas Howard, 3rd Duke of Norfolk believed would quell any rising in Suffolk.

In 1542, Waldegrave served under the Duke of Norfolk's command in the war against Scotland, and two years later he captained 60 of his own men in the French campaign. His election to the Parliament of 1545 reflected this recent military experience as much as his own standing in Suffolk and may have been promoted by his uncle, Sir William Drury, as Sheriff of Norfolk and Suffolk. Although he was not to be re-elected, early in January 1553 the Council considered him for nomination with Sir William Drury as Knights of the Shire for Suffolk in the forthcoming Parliament, but in the event nominated Sir Henry Bedingfeld with Drury.

Following Edward VI's death in the summer, William Cecil listed Waldegrave among potential supporters of Lady Jane Grey, but on being summoned to Kenninghall, Norfolk by Mary Tudor on 8 July 1553 he joined her in her successful bid for the throne. Later he heard the indictments in Suffolk against Jane's adherents.

== Family ==
Waldegrave married Juliana, the daughter of Sir John Raysnford of Essex, with whom he had four children:

- Dorothy Waldegrave, married Sir John Spring of Lavenham
- Margaret Waldegrave
- Mary Waldegrave
- Sir William Waldegrave, married firstly Elizabeth (d.1581), daughter of Thomas Mildmay and secondly Grizelda, daughter of William Paget, 1st Baron Paget

While on a visit to Calais late in 1554, perhaps in connection with the arrival of Cardinal Reginald Pole, Waldegrave fell sick. He died there on the following 12 December.
