= James Waldegrave, 13th Earl Waldegrave =

British peer and businessman

James "Jamie" Sherbrooke Waldegrave, 13th Earl Waldegrave (born 8 December 1940), styled Viscount Chewton until 1995, is a British peer and businessman.

Waldegrave is the son of Geoffrey Noel Waldegrave, 12th Earl Waldegrave (1905–1995), and Mary Hermione Grenfell (1909–1995), who studied at Somerville College, Oxford. Earl Waldegrave was educated at Eton and Trinity College, Cambridge, and stroked the Cambridge crew in the University Boat Race in 1962 and 1963. In 1986, he married Mary Alison Anthea Furness (born 10 November 1946), a journalist for the Evening Standard and philosophy lecturer. She is the daughter of the late Sir Robert Furness (1883–1954) and Joyce Lucy Sophie Marc (1905–1995). Earl Waldegrave inherited his father's titles in 1995. The marriage produced two sons, the couple divorced later in 1996.

Lord Waldegrave currently runs his estate based at Priory Farm, Chewton Mendip, Somerset, with industrial units and offices let out to various businesses upon the old cheese making site. Earl Waldegrave is the elder brother of William Waldegrave, Baron Waldegrave of North Hill, a former Conservative Cabinet Minister in Margaret Thatcher's government, and the brother of Lady Susan Hussey, who was Woman of the Bedchamber to Queen Elizabeth II.

== Arms ==
Coat of arms of James Waldegrave, 13th Earl Waldegrave
Crest Out of a ducal coronet Or a plume of five ostrich feathers the first two Argent the third per pale Argent and Gules the last two Gules. Escutcheon Per pale Argent and Gules. Supporters On either side a talbot Sable, ears Or, gorged with a mural crown Argent. Motto Passes avant (Press forward)

Peerage of Great Britain
Preceded by Geoffrey Noel Waldegrave	Earl Waldegrave; 1995–present	Incumbent
