= Ngozi Fulani =

Former charity executive and women's rights advocate (b. 1961)

- Born: Marlene Headley
- Education: SOAS University of London
- Occupation: CEO
- Organization: Sistah Space
- Children: 4

Ngozi Fulani (born Marlene Headley) is a British former charity executive who was chief executive officer of the registered charity Sistah Space.

== Early life and education ==
Fulani was born in Harlesden, and grew up in Kilburn, London, where she attended South Kilburn High School. Her parents were immigrants from Barbados. Her mother, a nurse, and her father, a British Rail worker, had come to London from the Caribbean in the 1950s as part of the Windrush generation. She has six siblings.

At the age of 18, she moved to Hackney to attend college, and later earned a bachelor's degree and a master's degree in African studies from SOAS University of London.

== Career ==
Fulani worked as a marriage registrar in Hackney and felt driven to train as an independent domestic violence advocate.

In 2015 Fulani founded Sistah Space, described as a "community-based nonprofit initiative created to bridge the gap in domestic abuse services for African heritage women and girls". The charity is the only one of its kind in the United Kingdom that is focused solely on supporting women and girls of African heritage.

== Buckingham Palace incident ==
In 2021, Fulani spoke in favour of Meghan, Duchess of Sussex, following her interview with Oprah Winfrey, describing her as "a survivor of domestic violence from her in-laws". On 29 November 2022, she attended a reception hosted by Queen Camilla at Buckingham Palace to raise awareness as part of the 16 Days of Activism against Gender-based Violence.

The following day, Fulani used Twitter to publish the alleged transcript of a conversation she claimed to have had with Lady Susan Hussey, a Lady of the Household. According to Fulani's account, Lady Hussey repeatedly asked Fulani where she was "really" from after Fulani said she was born and raised in the UK. Fulani considered Hussey's comments and actions to be abuse, saying, "Although I didn't experience physical violence, what I feel I experienced was a form of abuse", and "... if you move my hair without permission, to me, that's abuse".

Following the allegation, Hussey resigned her position and apologised. The Palace said that Hussey's remarks were "unacceptable and deeply regrettable" and that "the individual concerned would like to express her profound apologies for the hurt caused and has stepped aside".

Fulani reported receiving "horrific abuse" online since the Buckingham Palace event. Following this, Ngozi paused the work of Sistah Space, citing safety concerns. The Charity Commission subsequently announced a preliminary investigation into Sistah Space over concerns regarding financial management and organisational setup at the charity, which were brought to light in the wake of Fulani's Buckingham Palace allegations.

On 16 December Fulani and Hussey met at Buckingham Palace to address the incident, with Hussey offering her "sincere apologies for the comments that were made and the distress they caused". A joint statement was released afterwards, reporting that the meeting was "filled with warmth and understanding" and that Fulani "has accepted this apology and appreciates that no malice was intended".

In March 2023, Fulani temporarily stepped down from her position as CEO of Sistah Space, citing the abuse she received as the reason. She also criticised the Palace for not helping her tackle the abuse. In response, the Palace reiterated the apologies made earlier and added that it had stood by the statement they mutually published with Fulani's approval in December 2022, which included an agreement that no further media comment would be made. The Palace also mentioned the message of thanks it received from Sistah Space after the meeting between Fulani and Hussey, in which the charity thanked them for their support and assistance with Fulani's security concerns, and for handling some of the abuse she had received on social media and elsewhere.

== Personal life ==
As of 2020, Fulani resided in north London. She is widowed, and has four children and three grandchildren.

In May 2024, she was seen supporting Diane Abbott at a rally, at Hackney Town Hall.
