= Lady Susan Hussey =

British noblewoman (born 1939)

The Right Honourable The Lady Hussey of North Bradley GCVO
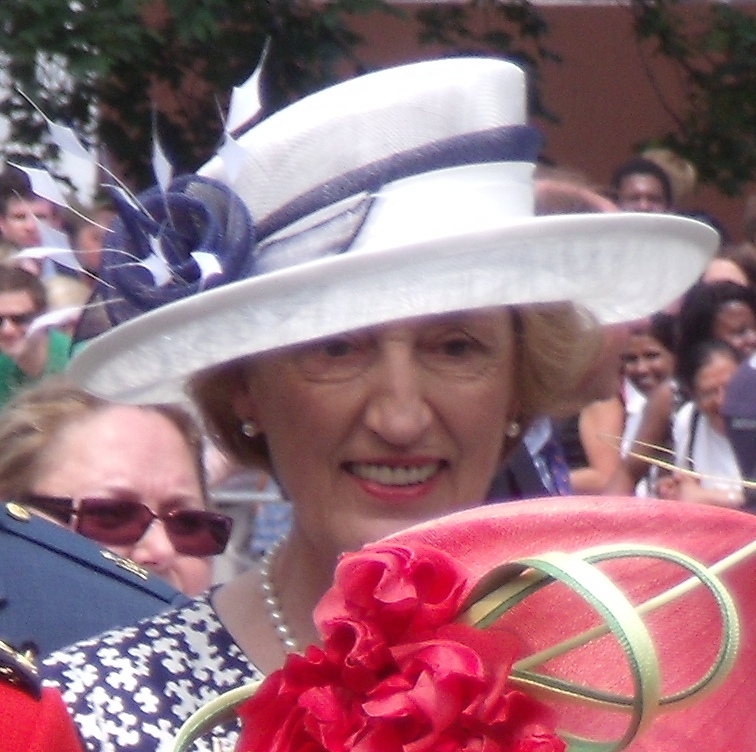
- Hussey in Toronto in 2010
- Born: Lady Susan Katharine Waldegrave; 1 May 1939 (age 87)
- Other name: Lady Susan Hussey
- Occupations: Woman of the Bedchamber (formerly); Lady of the Household
- Spouse: Marmaduke Hussey, Baron Hussey of North Bradley (m. 1959; died 2006)
- Children: 2 (including Katharine)
- Parents: Geoffrey Waldegrave, 12th Earl Waldegrave (father); Mary Grenfell (mother)
- Relatives: James Waldegrave, 13th Earl Waldegrave (brother); William Waldegrave, Baron Waldegrave of North Hill (brother)
- Family: Waldegrave

Susan Katharine Hussey, Baroness Hussey of North Bradley (née Waldegrave; born 1 May 1939), known as Lady Susan Hussey, is a British noblewoman who served as a Woman of the Bedchamber to Queen Elizabeth II and is a Lady of the Household under King Charles III. According to BBC News, Hussey "was a key and trusted figure in the British royal household for decades."

== Early life ==
Lady Susan Katharine Waldegrave was born on 1 May 1939 in Bath, Somerset. She is the fifth and youngest daughter of the 12th Earl Waldegrave, and Mary Hermione Grenfell (1909–1995). She is the sister of the 13th Earl Waldegrave and the Conservative politician William Waldegrave. Her aunt, Dame Frances Campbell-Preston, was lady-in-waiting to Queen Elizabeth The Queen Mother.

== Royal household ==
Hussey joined the royal household in 1960, initially helping with royal correspondence, before being promoted to the position of Woman of the Bedchamber, owing to her knowledge of the inner workings of the household. She was a close friend of Queen Elizabeth II, as well as of Queen Margrethe II of Denmark, and often spent time at Balmoral Castle.

During her time as a courtier, Hussey was given the job of helping new arrivals adjust to life in the royal household, such as Diana, Princess of Wales. Another such new arrival whom Hussey was tasked with assisting was Meghan, Duchess of Sussex.

Hussey is a godmother to Charles and Diana's first-born son, William, Prince of Wales, and was chosen to accompany Queen Elizabeth at the funeral of Prince Philip.

With other members of the royal household, Hussey attended the state funeral of Queen Elizabeth II on 19 September 2022. Following the Queen's death, she was made a Lady of the Household, along with the late Queen's other ladies-in-waiting, and was responsible for assisting at events held at Buckingham Palace.

=== Departure and subsequent return to royal duties ===
In her role as a Lady of the Household, Hussey attended a reception hosted by Queen Camilla on 29 November 2022 as part of the Preventing Sexual Violence in Conflict initiative. One of the guests was Ngozi Fulani, who had founded Sistah Space, a London-based domestic violence charity that provides specialist services to women of African and Caribbean heritage. The two women engaged in a conversation which Fulani summarised on Twitter, resulting in wider public attention. Fulani said that Hussey had questioned her origins by repeatedly asking where she was "really" from, which Fulani interpreted as racist. Witnesses to the conversation, such as Women's Equality Party leader Mandu Reid, corroborated this account of events.

Once Fulani's account of the conversation became public, Hussey stepped aside from her honorary role and apologised via the Buckingham Palace press office. A spokesperson for her godson, William, Prince of Wales, said that "racism has no place in our society". The prime minister, Rishi Sunak, declined to comment on the controversy specifically, but stated that the country had made "incredible" progress in tackling racism, adding that it was "never done" and must continue to be addressed. Some journalists defended her; her friend Petronella Wyatt offered a character reference.

On 16 December, Hussey and Fulani met at Buckingham Palace to address the incident, with Hussey offering her apologies in person, which Fulani accepted. A joint statement was released afterwards, reporting that the meeting was "filled with warmth and understanding" and that Fulani accepted the apology and "appreciates that no malice was intended".

Hussey had reportedly returned to performing official royal duties by February 2023, representing Princess Anne at a memorial service for Dame Frances Campbell-Preston.

== Personal life ==
On 25 April 1959, she married Marmaduke Hussey (later Chairman of the Board of Governors of the BBC) and had two children: James Arthur (b. 1961) and Katharine Elizabeth (b. 1964). Her daughter Katharine married Sir Francis Brooke Bt. and followed her mother into royal service, as one of the official Queen's Companions to Queen Camilla.

== Honours ==
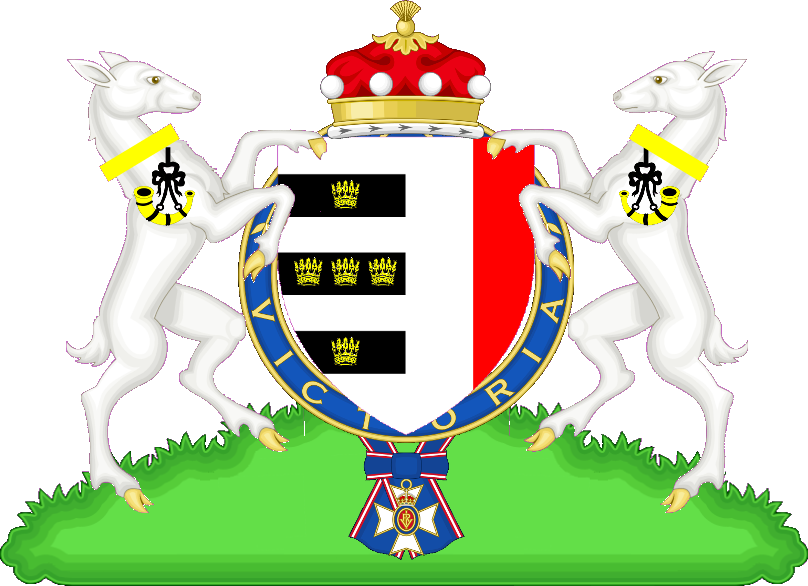
Coat of arms

Having previously been appointed a Commander of the Royal Victorian Order (CVO) in the 1971 New Year Honours, and Dame Commander of the Royal Victorian Order (DCVO) in the 1984 New Year Honours, Hussey was promoted to Dame Grand Cross of the Royal Victorian Order (GCVO) in the 2013 Birthday Honours. An armorial plate for her was installed at the Queen's Chapel of the Savoy in 2017.

In September 2015, she received the Sash of Special Category of the Order of the Aztec Eagle, the highest Mexican honour awarded to a foreigner.

| Country | Date | Appointment | Ribbon | Post-nominal letters | Notes |
|---|---|---|---|---|---|
| United Kingdom | 31 December 1970 | Commander of the Royal Victorian Order | | CVO | Promoted to DCVO in 1983 |
| United Kingdom | 31 December 1983 | Dame Commander of the Royal Victorian Order | | DCVO | Promoted to GCVO in 2013 |
| United Kingdom | 15 June 2013 | Dame Grand Cross of the Royal Victorian Order | | GCVO | |
| United Kingdom | 6 February 1977 | Queen Elizabeth II Silver Jubilee Medal | | | |
| United Kingdom | 6 February 2002 | Queen Elizabeth II Golden Jubilee Medal | | | |
| United Kingdom | 6 February 2012 | Queen Elizabeth II Diamond Jubilee Medal | | | |
| United Kingdom | 6 February 2022 | Queen Elizabeth II Platinum Jubilee Medal | | | |
| Mexico | 21 August 2019 | Sash of Special Category of the Order of the Aztec Eagle | | | |

== In popular culture ==
Hussey is portrayed by Haydn Gwynne in season 5 of The Crown.
