= Sistah Space =

UK charity

- Formation: 2015
- Founder: Ngozi Fulani
- Legal status: Charity
- Purpose: Domestic violence support
- Headquarters: Hackney, London, UK
- Website: www.sistahspace.org

Sistah Space is a London-based domestic violence charity that provides specialist services to women of African and Caribbean heritage.

== History ==
Sistah Space was founded by Ngozi Fulani in 2015, following the 2014 murder of Valerie Forde and her daughter. Sistah Space is "community-based nonprofit initiative created to bridge the gap in domestic abuse services for African heritage women and girls" Sistah Space operated from a retail location in Lower Clapton, switching to accommodation on Mare Street, Hackney provided by Hackney Council in December 2019.

In 2020, the organisation complained about tweets sent by Philip Glanville. In the same year, the organisation entered into a dispute with Hackney Council over premises in Clapton supplied under a voluntary sector lease, which it said were unsafe. Sistah Space subsequently changed its location. The following year, the organisation suggested sensitivity training for police to improve their support for black women who have experienced domestic violence. In August 2022, they were denied permission to have a float at the Hackney Carnival.

The charity attracted attention in November 2022 when its founder, Fulani, alleged that she had been subject to racist questioning by Lady Susan Hussey, a royal staff member, at a Buckingham Palace function. Both ladies later met and Lady Susan Hussey apologised for the comments she had made and any distress they had caused.

In December 2022, the charity stopped much of its work and made a statement on Instagram that online abuse and safety concerns caused the decision. The same month, reports stated that the Charity Commission and the London Assembly were making preliminary investigations into the running of Sistah Space, following a series of more than 200 posts by an anonymous Twitter user questioning the charity's finances and organisation.

The Charity Commission subsequently said "We have carefully reviewed and assessed concerns raised about Sistah Space, and, as a result, have written to the trustees," and provided advice about preparing and filing annual accounts and managing conflicts of interest. Some commentators felt the Charity Commission was being mis-used, with writer Nels Abbey suggesting the investigation was evidence of an agenda to keep black-led charities in their place.

In 2025, Sistah Space launched a £350,000 fundraising campaign in order to open the first UK refuge for Black women and children in a building and on land already bought by the charity.
