= Attborough Swallet =

Cave in Somerset, England

Coordinates: 51°15′48″N 2°37′45″W

- Interactive map of Attborough Swallet
- Location: Red Quar, Chewton Mendip
- OS grid: ST56105181
- Depth: 44 metres
- Length: 244 metres
- Geology: Dolomitic Conglomerate and Marl
- Registry: Mendip Cave Registry

Attborough Swallet (also known as Red Quar Swallet) is a cave in Chewton Mendip in Somerset, England.

It is unusual for a cave on the Mendip Hills in that it is formed in Dolomitic Conglomerate and Marl rather than ordinary limestone. The main part of the cave was first entered in 1992, although Red Quar Swallet had been dug in the 1930s and the entrance shaft is now a concrete pipe.

It takes its name from the Attborough field in which the entrance is situated. Red Quar Swallet comes from the small scale quarrying of red Triassic conglomerate.

The underground stream feeding water into the sump flows into Wigmore Swallet.

== See also ==
- Caves of the Mendip Hills
