= Mary Morrison (courtier) =

English lady-in-waiting

The Honourable Dame Mary Morrison GCVO
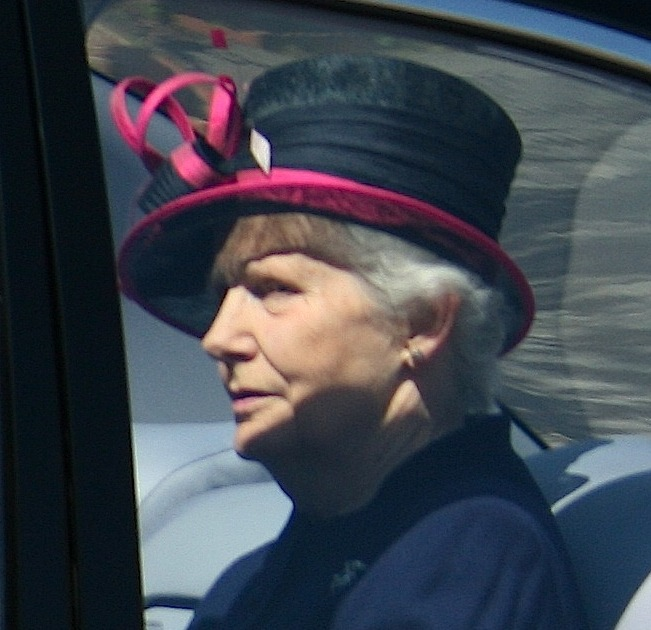
- Morrison in Hitchin in 2012

Woman of the Bedchamber
- In office 1960–2022
- Monarch: Elizabeth II

Personal details
- Born: 17 May 1937 (age 89)
- Parent: John Morrison, 1st Baron Margadale (father)
- Relatives: James Morrison, 2nd Baron Margadale (brother); Sir Charles Morrison (brother); Sir Peter Morrison (brother)

Dame Mary Anne Morrison GCVO (born 17 May 1937) is a British courtier and aristocrat who served as a Woman of the Bedchamber to Elizabeth II from 1960 until the Queen's death in 2022.

== Biography ==
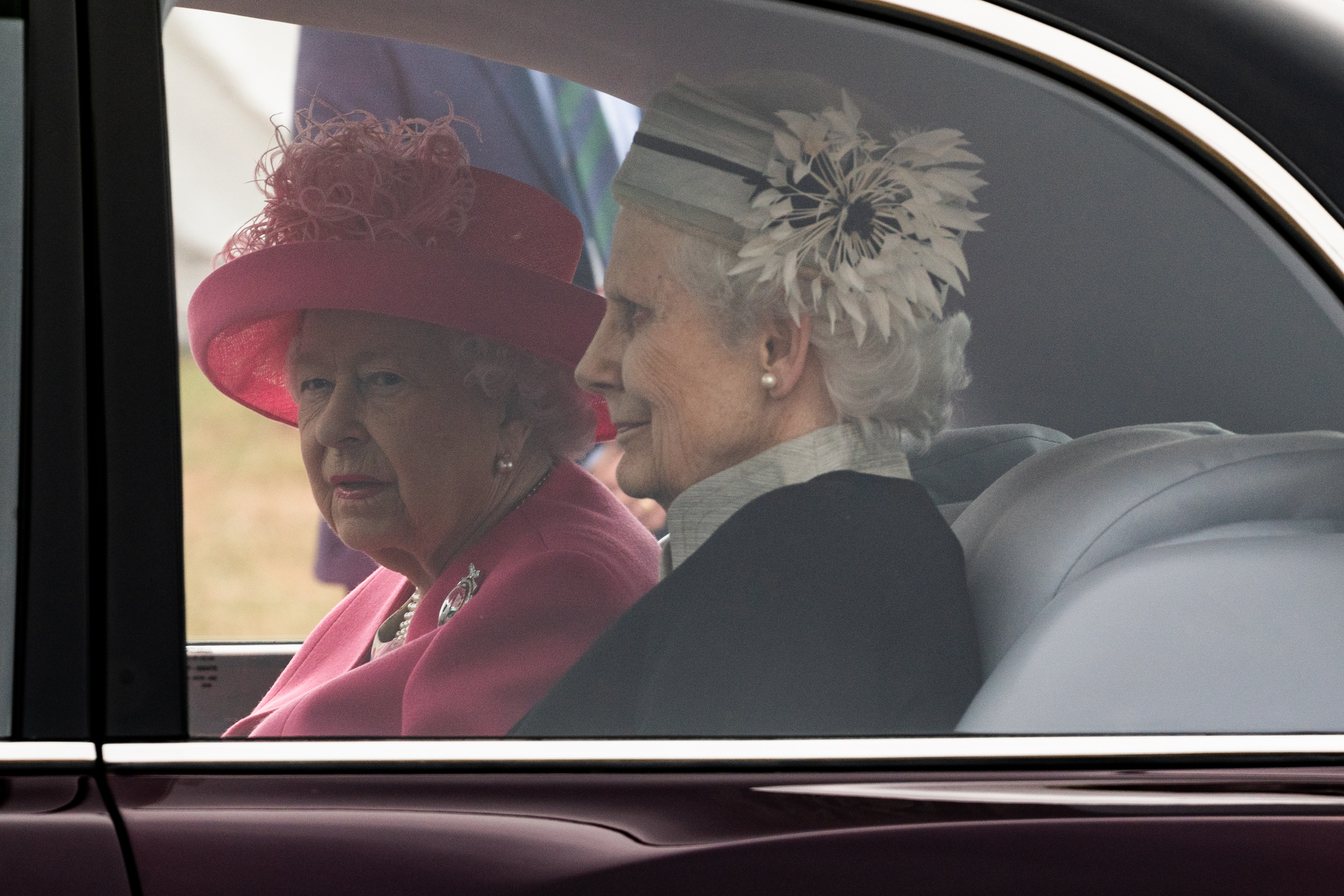
Morrison accompanying Elizabeth II to the national D-Day commemoration in Southsea in 2019.

Morrison is the daughter of John Morrison, 1st Baron Margadale, and his wife Margaret Smith, daughter of Frederick Smith, 2nd Viscount Hambleden. Her father and brothers were active politicians in the Conservative Party. She was educated at Heathfield School, Ascot and at schools abroad. She was appointed a Woman of the Bedchamber to Elizabeth II on 1 January 1960.

In recognition of her service, Morrison was appointed a Commander of the Royal Victorian Order (CVO) in the 1970 Birthday Honours. She was promoted to a Dame Commander (DCVO) in the 1982 Birthday Honours and eventually a Dame Grand Cross (GCVO) in the 2013 Birthday Honours. She has been described as one of Elizabeth II's closest confidantes.

Following Elizabeth II's death, she, along with the late Queen's other ladies-in-waiting, were made "Ladies of the Household", responsible for helping with events at Buckingham Palace.
