= Robert Allason Furness =

British colonial administrator and British Council official

Sir Robert Allason Furness KBE CMG
- Born: 1883; Rugby, England
- Died: 4 December 1954 (aged 70–71); Little Shelford, England
- Education: Rugby School; King's College, Cambridge

Sir Robert Allason Furness KBE CMG (1883 – 4 December 1954), also known as Robin Furness, was Professor of English at Cairo University and the representative in Egypt of the British Council between 1945 and 1950. He was an expert adviser on the establishment of BBC Arabic, the BBC's first radio station to broadcast in Arabic.

Shortly after Sir Robert's death, the writer and historian Hilary Wayment sent a tribute to The Times stating that Sir Robert 'seemed to have the gift of perpetual youth and to enter into the enthusiasms of his younger colleagues with the zest of an undergraduate'. The tribute concluded that to his friends in England and Egypt, 'the lasting impression he will leave behind is one of generous and high-spirited enjoyments, and of sheer charm and quality of mind'. He was also described as 'a very tall, elegant, sardonic man, learned about the poets of Ancient Alexandria, and with a line in extravagant bawdry'.

== Early life ==
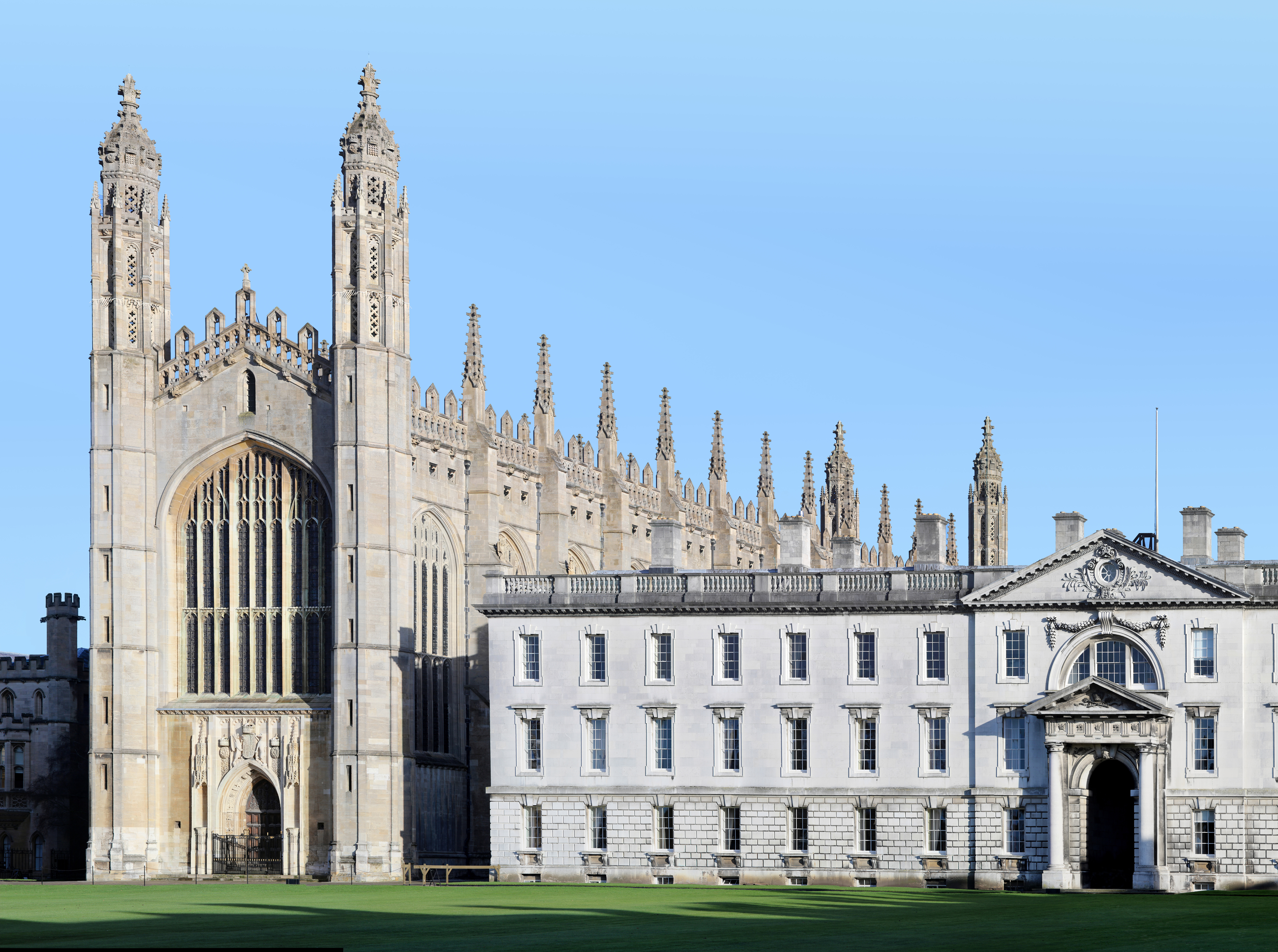
King's College, Cambridge

Robert Allason Furness was born in 1883, the son of the Reverend John Monteith Furness and Sophia Elizabeth Furness (née Haslam). He was educated at Rugby School, where he was head boy, and went up to King's College, Cambridge, where he was a friend of John Maynard Keynes and Edward Morgan Forster. At Cambridge he graduated with a first in the Classical Tripos.

Furness was the youngest of four children. His eldest brother, John Monteith Furness (1869–1944), was a Cambridge Apostle as an undergraduate at King's (from which he also graduated with a first in the Classical Tripos) and later an educationalist, becoming Headmaster of Richmond School, the Kedive School in Cairo and later Director of Egyptian Education in London. He was a close friend of Oscar Browning.

Furness's sister, Sophia Mary Maud Furness (1871–1950), was educated at Girton College, Cambridge, and became an authority on the painter Georges de La Tour publishing a book on the artist's work in 1949. Another brother, Everard Haslam Furness (1873–1941), won the mile race at Eton College in 1891 and, following in the footsteps of his brothers, graduated with a first in the Classical Tripos from King's.

== Public life ==
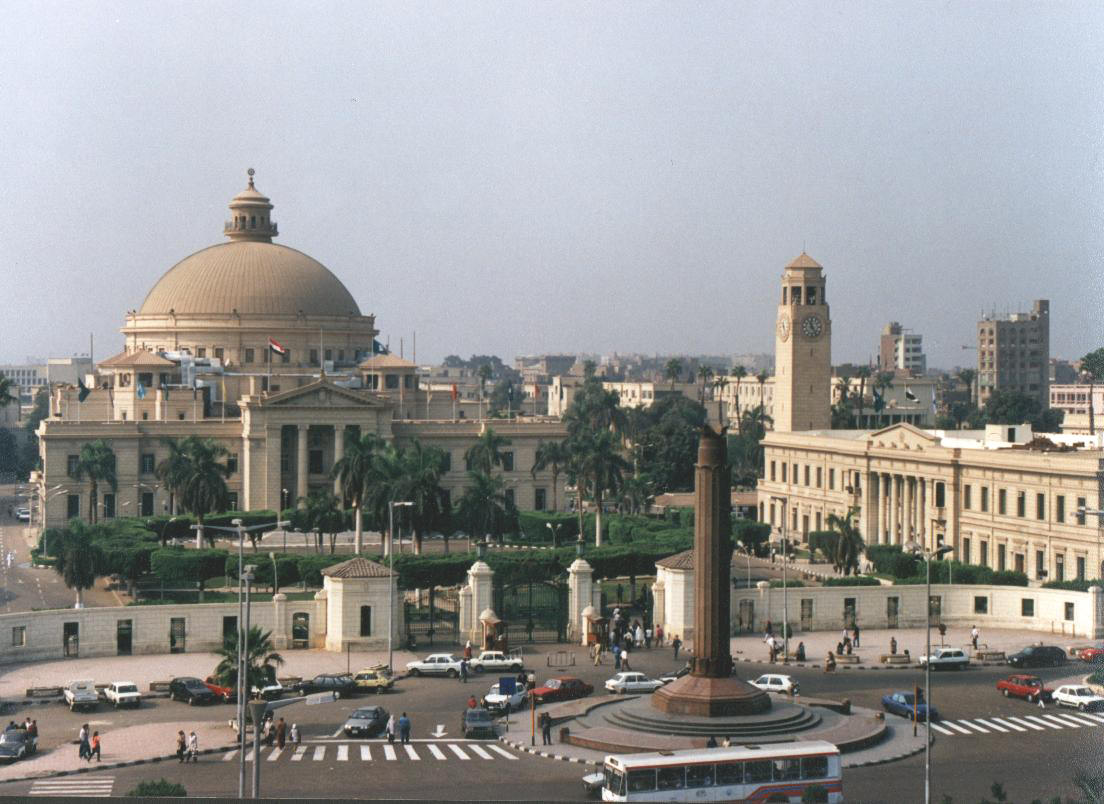
Cairo University

In 1905, Furness entered the Egyptian Civil Service, initially at the Ministry of the Interior. He left the service but then took up several appointments in Egypt. In 1919 he was seconded to the staff of the High Commissioner and was subsequently made Oriental Secretary. Around this time he introduced E.M. Forster to the Egyptian Greek poet Constantine Cavafy.

Furness later served as Deputy Director-General of Egyptian State Broadcasting and was Press Officer to the Government of Palestine in 1934. In 1936 he was appointed Professor of English at Cairo University and, at the outbreak of World War II, was made Deputy Chief Censor. After the war he gave up these posts to become the appointed representative of the British Council in Egypt.

Furness was made CBE in 1926 and CMG in 1944. Following his wartime service and his contribution to the British Council he was made KBE in 1951.

== Family life ==
In 1945, Furness married Joyce Lucy Sophie Marc. Joyce Marc was born in 1905 in Montmorency, France. Her father, Maximilian Marc, was the youngest of ten children to a Moscow based merchant banking family. Joyce was educated at Headington School and King's College, London. In the 1930s Joyce Marc was a friend of Herbert Butterfield, Professor of History and later Vice-Chancellor at the University of Cambridge.

Robert and Joyce Furness had one daughter, Mary Alison Anthea Furness, who was born in Cairo in 1946 and later became a journalist and philosopher. The writer, Martin Amis, proposed to Mary Furness in the 1970s. In 1986, Mary Furness married James Waldegrave, 13th Earl Waldegrave, and by that line Sir Robert is the grandfather of Edward Robert Waldegrave, Viscount Chewton, and Robert Arthur Riversdale Waldegrave.

Shortly after Sir Robert's death, Hilary Wayment OBE FSA sent a tribute to The Times stating that 'Sir Robert Furness seemed to have the gift of perpetual youth and to enter into the enthusiasms of his younger colleagues with the zest of an undergraduate'. The tribute concluded that to his friends in England and Egypt 'the lasting impression he will leave behind is one of generous and high-spirited enjoyments, and of sheer charm and quality of mind'.

== Publication ==
- Poems of Callimachus, Four Hymns and the Epigrams, with a Verse Translation, by Robert Allason Furness, and Sixteen Illustrations. Published by Jonathan Cape, London, 1931
