= Stuart Young (accountant) =

English business executive and accountant

Stuart Young (23 April 1934 – 29 August 1986) was an English business executive and accountant.

The younger brother of Lord Young of Graffham, Stuart Young succeeded George Howard as the chairman of the BBC board of governors in 1983, and remained in this role until his early death from cancer in 1986.

When he first became a BBC governor in 1981 he argued that the BBC should be funded by advertising. However, he later changed his mind and argued for the continuation of the television licence during the Peacock Committee. This disappointed Prime Minister Margaret Thatcher, who disliked the television licence and had originally appointed Young believing that, as a Conservative, he would challenge the more left-leaning Director-General of the BBC, Alasdair Milne. She believed that Young had “gone native” and was now supporting the BBC instead of the government.

At the time of his death in 1986, aged 52, Young had with his wife Shirley, two daughters – Lesley and Lynda.

Media offices
Preceded by George Howard	Chairman of the BBC Board of Governors; 1983 - 1986	Succeeded by Marmaduke Hussey
