= Henry Waldegrave, 11th Earl Waldegrave =

British peer and priest

Henry Noel Waldegrave, 11th Earl Waldegrave (14 October 1854 – 30 December 1936) was a British peer and priest.

Waldegrave was born in 1854, the posthumous son of William Waldegrave, Viscount Chewton (the eldest son of William Waldegrave, 8th Earl Waldegrave) and his wife Frances Waldegrave, Viscountess Chewton. He was educated at Eton and graduated from Trinity College, Cambridge in 1878. He then entered the ministry and was rector of Stoke d'Abernon from 1890 to 1898, Marston Bigot from 1905 to 1912 and some time for Orchardleigh and Lullington.

On 27 October 1892, he married Anne Katharine Bastard, daughter of Rev. William Pollexfen Bastard and Caroline (Woollcombe) Bastard. They had five children.

In 1933, he inherited his nephew's titles, and on his own death in 1936 was succeeded by his eldest son, Geoffrey.

Peerage of Great Britain
Preceded by William Waldegrave	Earl Waldegrave; 1933–1936	Succeeded by Geoffrey Waldegrave
