= Edward Waldegrave =

English courtier and Catholic recusant

Sir Edward Waldegrave (c. 1516 – 1 September 1561) was an English courtier and Catholic recusant.

== Family ==
Edward Waldegrave was the eldest son of John Waldegrave (died 1543) by Lora Rochester, daughter of Sir John Rochester of Essex, and sister of Sir Robert Rochester. He was the grandson of Sir Edward Waldegrave of Bures, Suffolk, and a descendant of Sir Richard Waldegrave, Speaker of the House of Commons.

== Career ==
In 1547 Waldegrave joined the household of Princess Mary, and was granted the manor and rectory of West Haddon, Northamptonshire. He also bought the manor of Borley in Essex, and made that his home.

In 1551 he was imprisoned in the Tower of London by King Edward VI (with Rochester and Francis Englefield), for refusing to carry out the Privy Council's ban on Mary having mass said in her house of Copt Hall, near Epping, Essex. He was released a year later and on Mary's accession in 1553 he was knighted, admitted to the Privy Council, granted the manors of Navestock, Essex, and Chewton, Somerset, and appointed Master of the Great Wardrobe.

Waldegrave was then elected to the Parliament of England for Wiltshire in October 1553, twice for Somerset in 1554 and lastly for Essex in 1558. He succeeded Rochester as Chancellor of the Duchy of Lancaster in 1554 and was granted the manor of Cobham, Kent. However, after Mary's death a year later, he was dismissed from all his posts and committed to the Tower again, by Queen Elizabeth, for allowing mass to be celebrated in his house.

Waldegrave died in the Tower in 1561. His grandson was Sir Edward Waldegrave, 1st Baronet.

As Master of the Wardrobe, Waldegrave managed the financial account of the funeral of Edward VI. Waldegrave had a budget of £1300 and a consignment of rich fabrics delivered from the queen's stock by Ralph Sadler.

== Marriage and children ==
Waldegrave married Frances Neville (died 1599), a daughter of the executed Sir Edward Neville. Their children included:

- Catharine Waldegrave, who married Thomas Gawen of Norrington, Wiltshire
- Charles Waldegrave, who married Jeronima Jerningham, a daughter of Henry Jerningham, and was the father of Sir Edward Waldegrave, 1st Baronet. Jeronima Waldegrave inherited coral rosary beads which her mother had given to Frances Waldegrave.
- Nicholas Waldegrave, who married Catharine Browne
- Magdalen Waldegrave, who married John Southcote of Witham

Frances Waldegrave married Chidiock Paulet after Edward Waldegrave's death. She had been a servant of Mary I. Her will mentions her collection of medical books and her distilled waters, as well as a number of pieces of jewelry. She had received gifts of jewels from other courtiers, including three rings on a bracelet from Mary Finch.

== Notes ==
Political offices
Preceded by Sir Robert Rochester	Chancellor of the Duchy of Lancaster; 1558–1559	Succeeded by Sir Ambrose Cave
