= Smallbridge Hall =

House in Bures St. Mary, Suffolk, England

Coordinates: 51.9626°N 0.8069°E

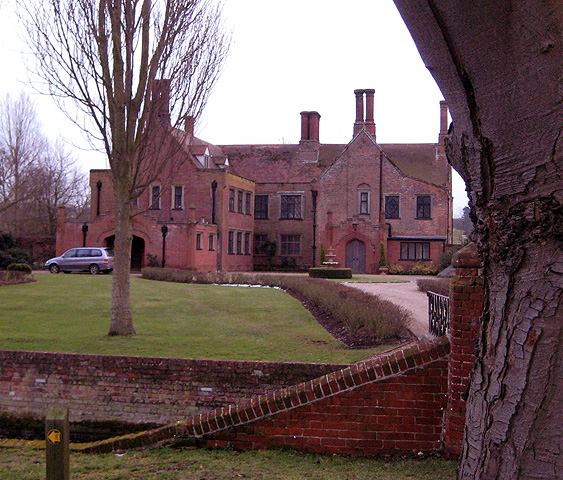
Smallbridge Hall

Smallbridge Hall is a Grade II* listed English country house in Bures St. Mary, Suffolk, near Colchester, England. The house is partially surrounded by a moat and stands on the bank of the River Stour. The present building is one wing of a large two-storey red-brick Elizabethan mansion. It was heavily restored once c.1874 and again in 1932.

== History ==
The Waldegrave family had been the owners of the Smallbridge hall and the Wormingford estate which is on the other bank of the River Stour from at least the 14th century. The Smallbridge hall had come into their possession when Sir Richard Waldegrave married Joan, the widow of Sir Robert de Bures. Around 1555, Sir William Waldegrave rebuilt the house, and received Queen Elizabeth there in 1561. The property remained with the Waldegrave family until c.1700 when it was sold to pay debts. The hall has been owned by many other families after that. It was once rebuilt c.1893 and further restored by Lady Phylis Macrae, daughter of the Marchioness of Bristol, in 1932.

Thai Formula One driver Alex Albon lived in Smallbridge Hall during his childhood before moving out in 2012.

== See also ==
- Waldegrave family
