= William Waldegrave (physician) =

English physician

- Occupation: Physician

Sir William Waldegrave (fl. 1689) was an English physician.

== Biography ==
Waldegrave was probably the second son of Philip Waldegrave of Borley in Essex (a cadet of the family of Waldegrave of Chewton), by his second wife, Margaret, daughter of John Eve of Easton in Essex, and, if so, was born in 1618. He received the degree of doctor of medicine of Padua on 12 March 1659, and was admitted an honorary fellow of the College of Physicians, London, in December 1664. He was created a fellow of the college, by the charter of James II of England, in 1686, but does not appear to have been admitted as such at the comitia majora extraordinaria of 12 April 1687, which was specially convened for the reception of the charter and the admission of those who were thereby constituted fellows.

On 1 July 1689 he was returned to the House of Lords by the college as a ‘papist.’ He was physician to the queen of James II, and, as Bishop Burnet tells us, was hastily summoned, along with Sir Charles Scarburgh, to her majesty in 1688, shortly before the birth of the Prince of Wales (the ‘Old Pretender’), when she was in danger of miscarrying. In 1691 £434 10 shillings was owing to him from the estate of Henry, first baron Waldegrave (Hist. MSS. Comm. 13th Rep. App. v. 446). He is there styled Sir William, but his name does not appear in Townsend's ‘Catalogue of Knights.’ He is believed to have died a bachelor.
