= Chidiock Paulet =

16th-century English politician

Chidiock Paulet (by 1521 – 17 August 1574) was an English politician and Captain of Portsmouth. He was born the third son of William Paulet, 1st Marquess of Winchester and educated at the Inner Temple. His unusual name originates from the village of Chideock, Dorset, which was held by Arundells to whom his family were related by marriage.

He was Esquire of the Stable by 1545, Receiver at the Court of Augmentations for Gloucestershire, Hampshire and Wiltshire by 1550–1554, and at the Exchequer from 1554 to his death.

In the 1530s he was granted a lease of the manor of Odiham, Hampshire. In 1549 he was granted the manor of Wade in Eling by his father. He was Captain of Portsmouth from May 1554 – 1559 and treasurer of the Bishop of Winchester from 1566 until his death.

He was returned as a Member (MP) of the Parliament of England for Bramber in 1547. As he had no link with the Sussex constituency, this was presumably through the influence of the privy council, Bramber then being held by the Crown. Following the death of Henry VIII, he did not sit again until he was returned for Gatton in October 1553 following the accession of Mary I.

Although he served as a justice of the peace under Elizabeth I, he was described as not being in favour of her religious settlement. His religious sympathies are also suggested by his failure to sit in Edward VI's parliaments and the Hampshire recusant Peter Tichborne naming his son Chidiock.

== Marriages and Death ==
He died in 1574. He married firstly Elizabeth, the daughter of Sir Thomas White of South Warnborough, Hampshire, with whom he had 1 son and 3 daughters.

He married secondly Frances (died 1599), the daughter of Sir Edward Neville of Aldington, Kent and widow of Sir Edward Waldegrave of Borley, Essex, with whom he had another son Thomas Paulet. She had been a servant of Mary I of England. Her will mentions her collection of medical books and her distilled waters, as well as a number of pieces of jewelry. She had received gifts of jewels from other courtiers, including three rings on a bracelet from Mary Finch.

== See also ==
- List of governors of Portsmouth
