= William Waldegrave, Baron Waldegrave of North Hill =

British politician (born 1946)

The Right Honourable The Lord Waldegrave of North Hill PC
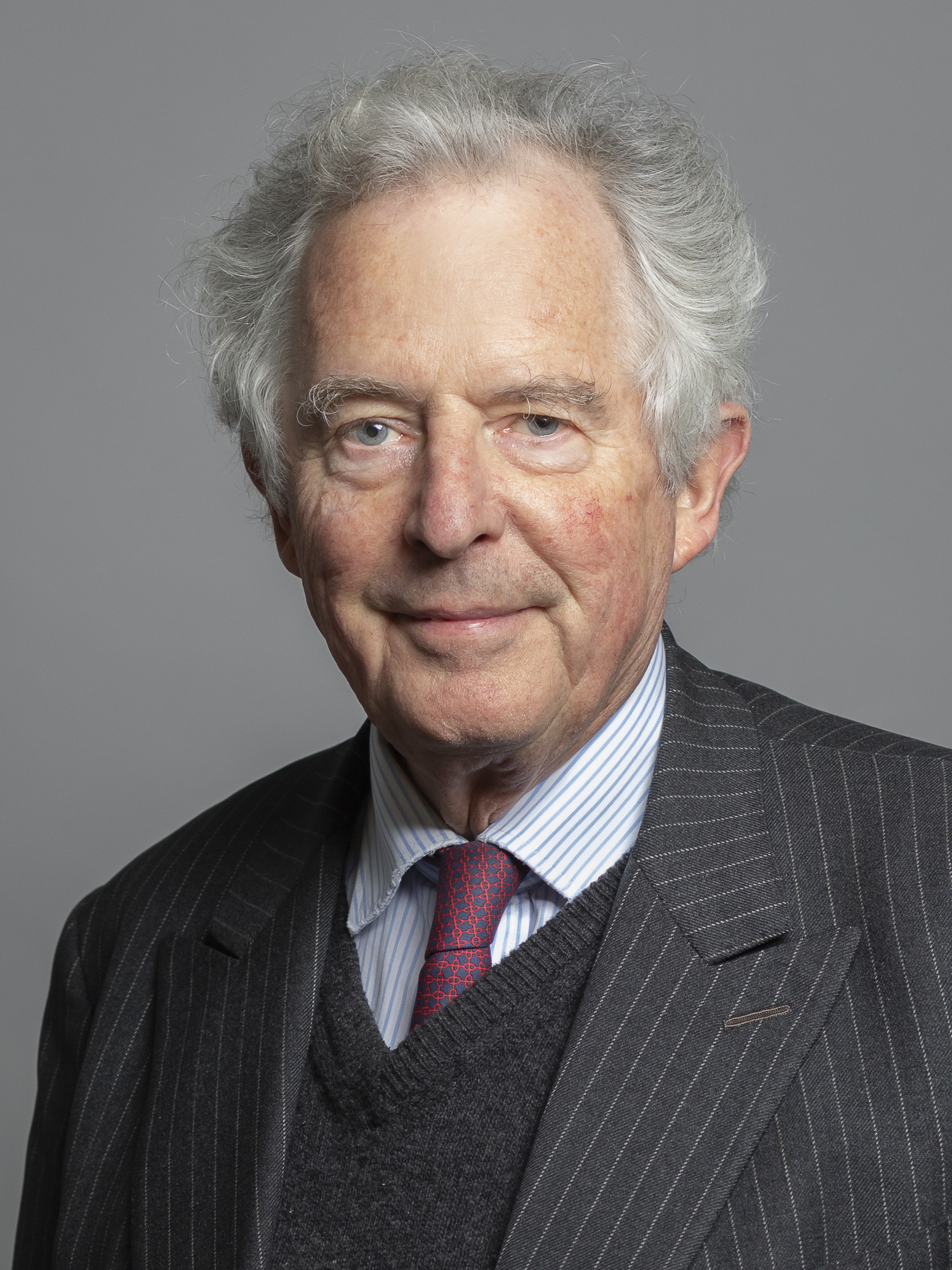
- Official portrait, 2020

Chief Secretary to the Treasury
- In office 5 July 1995 – 2 May 1997
- Prime Minister: John Major
- Chancellor: Kenneth Clarke
- Preceded by: Jonathan Aitken
- Succeeded by: Alistair Darling

Minister of Agriculture, Fisheries and Food
- In office 20 July 1994 – 5 July 1995
- Prime Minister: John Major
- Preceded by: Gillian Shephard
- Succeeded by: Douglas Hogg

Chancellor of the Duchy of Lancaster
- In office 10 April 1992 – 20 July 1994
- Prime Minister: John Major
- Preceded by: Chris Patten
- Succeeded by: David Hunt

Secretary of State for Health
- In office 2 November 1990 – 10 April 1992
- Prime Minister: Margaret Thatcher; John Major
- Preceded by: Kenneth Clarke
- Succeeded by: Virginia Bottomley
Junior ministerial offices 1981–1990
Minister of State for Foreign and Commonwealth Affairs
In office 26 July 1988 – 2 November 1990
Prime Minister	Margaret Thatcher
Sec. of State	Geoffrey Howe; John Major; Douglas Hurd
Preceded by	David Mellor
Succeeded by	Douglas Hogg
Minister of State for Housing and Planning
In office 13 June 1987 – 26 July 1988
Prime Minister	Margaret Thatcher
Sec. of State	Nicholas Ridley
Preceded by	John Patten
Succeeded by	The Earl of Caithness
Minister of State for Environment, Countryside and Planning
In office 10 September 1986 – 12 June 1987
Prime Minister	Margaret Thatcher
Sec. of State	Nicholas Ridley
Preceded by	The Lord Elton
Succeeded by	The Lord Belstead
Minister of State for Local Government
In office 2 September 1985 – 9 September 1986
Prime Minister	Margaret Thatcher
Sec. of State	Kenneth Baker; Nicholas Ridley
Preceded by	Kenneth Baker
Succeeded by	Rhodes Boyson
Parliamentary Under-Secretary of State for Environment
In office 13 June 1983 – 2 September 1985 Serving with Sir George Young (1983–1985); The Earl of Avon (1983–1985)
Prime Minister	Margaret Thatcher
Sec. of State	Patrick Jenkin
Preceded by	Giles Shaw
Succeeded by	Angela Rumbold
Parliamentary Under-Secretary of State for Education and Science
In office 15 September 1981 – 13 June 1983 Serving with Rhodes Boyson (1981–1983); William Shelton (1981–1983)
Prime Minister	Margaret Thatcher
Sec. of State	Mark Carlisle; Sir Keith Joseph
Preceded by	Neil Macfarlane
Succeeded by	Peter Brooke · Bob Dunn
Parliamentary offices
Member of the House of Lords
Lord Temporal
Life peerage 28 July 1999
Member of Parliament for Bristol West
In office 3 May 1979 – 8 April 1997
Preceded by	Robert Cooke
Succeeded by	Valerie Davey

Personal details
- Born: William Arthur Waldegrave; 15 August 1946 (age 80) London, England
- Party: Conservative
- Spouse: Caroline Burrows (m. 1975)
- Children: 4
- Parent(s): The 12th Earl Waldegrave; Mary Hermione Grenfell
- Relatives: The 13th Earl Waldegrave (brother); Lady Hussey of North Bradley (sister)
- Education: Eton College
- Alma mater: University of Oxford; Harvard University

William Arthur Waldegrave, Baron Waldegrave of North Hill PC (/ˈwɔːlɡreɪv/; born 15 August 1946) is a British Conservative Party politician who served as a Cabinet minister from 1990 until 1997, and is a life member of the Tory Reform Group. Since 1999, he has been a life peer in the House of Lords. Lord Waldegrave was provost of Eton College from 2009 to 2024. Additionally, he was chancellor of the University of Reading from 2016 to 2022.

Waldegrave's 2015 memoir, A Different Kind of Weather, discusses his high youthful political ambition, his political and to some extent personal life, and growing acceptance that he would not achieve his ultimate ambition. It also provides an account of the Heath, Thatcher and—to a lesser extent—Major governments, including his role in the development of the poll tax or Community Charge. It includes a chapter entitled 'The Poll Tax – all my own work'.

Waldegrave served as a trustee (1992–2011) and chair (2002–2011) of the Rhodes Trust, during which time he also helped to create and served as a trustee of the Mandela Rhodes Foundation. His portrait hangs at Rhodes House, Oxford.

He was the chairman of trustees of the National Museum of Science and Industry from 2002 to 2010.

== Early life ==
Bearing the title The Honourable from birth as a younger son of an Earl, Waldegrave was the youngest (by six years) of the seven children of Geoffrey Waldegrave, 12th Earl Waldegrave, and his wife Mary Hermione Grenfell. His elder brother is the present Earl. His father's title was created five generations earlier for the diplomat and ambassador James Waldegrave, 1st Earl Waldegrave, whose grandfather was James II and VII.

Waldegrave is the nephew of the courtier Dame Frances Campbell-Preston and one of his sisters is Lady Susan Hussey, who served as a Woman of the Bedchamber to Queen Elizabeth II and is a Lady of the Household under King Charles III, and who became Baroness Hussey of North Bradley upon her husband's elevation to the House of Lords in 1996.

=== Education ===
Waldegrave was privately educated at Eton College, where he won the Newcastle Scholarship in 1965. He then studied at the University of Oxford where he was an undergraduate student of Corpus Christi College. During his study, he served for a term as president of the Oxford Union and the Oxford University Conservative Association. Oxford was followed by Harvard University in the United States, on a Kennedy Scholarship. In 1971, he was elected a Prize Fellow of All Souls College, Oxford, and subsequently, in 2001, he was appointed a Distinguished Fellow in recognition of his significant contributions in the sphere of politics and international relations.

== Early career ==
In 1971, Waldegrave was working at the Conservative Research Department; that March he was appointed to the Central Policy Review Staff (CPRS, also referred to as the 'Think-Tank'). "He was from the beginning one of the most active 'philosophers' of the CPRS, and the proponent of strong views about its proper roles and functions". He was one of the few openly political members of the staff and was used by Victor Rothschild, head of the CPRS, as a link with both the Conservative party (then in government) and the outside, non-Civil Service world. He left in December 1973.

== Parliamentary career ==
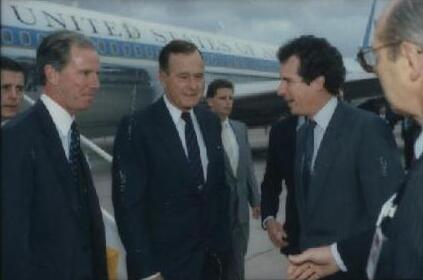
Waldegrave (right) with US President George H. W. Bush in 1990

He was elected to the House of Commons as Member of Parliament (MP) for Bristol West in 1979. He was regarded as a member of the "wet" or moderate tendency of the Conservative Party, and despite this progressed well from the backbenches in Margaret Thatcher's government.

=== As junior minister ===
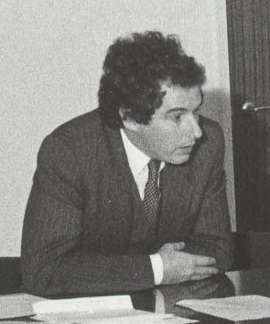
Waldegrave at the University of Salford in 1981

He became a Parliamentary under-secretary of state at the Department of Education and Science in 1981 before moving to the Department of the Environment in 1983. He remained at Environment, becoming a Minister of State in 1985, until he became a Minister of State at the Foreign and Commonwealth Office in 1988. In this post he was involved in setting policy on arms exports to Iraq; the initial draft of the Scott Report found that he had agreed in February 1989 to relax the policy, but had sent out 38 untrue letters to Members of Parliament stating that the policy was unchanged. However, Sir Richard Scott exonerated Waldegrave of "duplicitous intent" in wrongly describing the Government's policy.

=== As a Cabinet minister ===
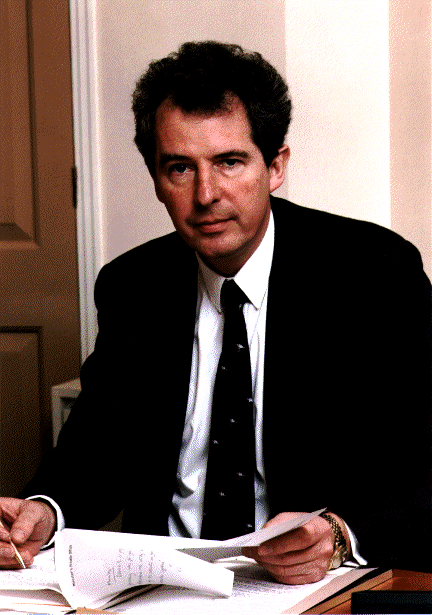
Official portrait as Chief Secretary to the Treasury

He was promoted to the Cabinet as Secretary of State for Health in November 1990, just days before Thatcher's resignation, and remained a member of the Cabinet throughout John Major's time as prime minister. He became Chancellor of the Duchy of Lancaster in the Cabinet Office with responsibility for public services and science in 1992, Secretary of State of Agriculture, Fisheries and Food in 1994 and Chief Secretary to the Treasury in 1995.

=== As member of the House of Lords ===
After losing his Commons seat to Valerie Davey in the 1997 general election, he entered the House of Lords being created a life peer as Baron Waldegrave of North Hill, of Chewton Mendip in the County of Somerset, on 28 July 1999.

== Private sector ==
Waldegrave was a director of Adam & Company, a member of the Royal Bank of Scotland Group, from 2017 to 2018. He has been a director of Coutts & Company, also a member of the Royal Bank of Scotland Group, since 2012. He is currently non-executive director of GW Pharmaceuticals, which is involved in the cannabis business.

== Personal life ==
He is married to Caroline Burrows, cookery writer and managing director of Leith's School of Food and Wine. They have four children, Katherine, Elizabeth, James and Harriet.

Waldegrave is a trustee of Cumberland Lodge, an educational charity. He is an active member of the board of managers for the Lewis Walpole Library, Yale University.

== Other notable events ==
Waldegrave attended Bilderberg Group meetings four times: 1987, 1988, 1990 and 1995.

In 1993, when he was the British science minister Waldegrave offered a prize for the best lay explanation of the Higgs boson. He had observed that British taxpayers were paying a lot of money (in contributions to CERN) for something very few of them understood, and he challenged UK particle physicists to explain, in a simple manner on one piece of paper, 'What is the Higgs Boson, and why do we want to find it?'

Professor David Miller's metaphor, which he entitled "A quasi-political explanation of the Higgs boson", is probably the most quoted explanation of the Higgs boson and won the prize:

- Miller asked his listeners to imagine a room full of Conservative party workers quietly talking to one another. This represents the Higgs field in space.
- A former Conservative Prime Minister enters the room. All the workers she passes are strongly attracted to her. As she moves through the room, the cluster of admirers around her create resistance to her movement, and she becomes 'heavier'. This can be imagined as how a particle moves through the Higgs field. The field clusters around a particle, resisting its motion and giving it mass.
- If a sleazy rumour crosses the room, it creates the same sort of clustering. The workers gather together to hear the details, the cluster can move across the room as the workers pass on the details to their neighbours. This cluster is the Higgs particle or Higgs Boson.

== Arms ==
Coat of arms of William Waldegrave, Baron Waldegrave of North Hill
Notes The shield and crest are the same as those of the Earl Waldegrave. Crest Out of a ducal coronet Or a plume of five ostrich feathers the first two Argent the third per pale Argent and Gules the last two Gules Escutcheon Per pale Argent and Gules Supporters On either side a talbot reguardant Sable eased Or gorged with a mural crown Argent and holding in the mouth a columbine Gules slipped Or Motto Coelum Non Animum (Always The Same Person)

== Bibliography ==
- Waldegrave, William: The Binding of Leviathan – Conservatism and the Future, Hamilton (1978); ISBN 978-0-24189-866-6
- Waldegrave, William: A Different Kind of Weather – A Memoir, Constable (2015); ISBN 978-1-47211-975-9

Parliament of the United Kingdom
Preceded by Robert Cooke	Member of Parliament for Bristol West; 1979–1997	Succeeded by Valerie Davey
Political offices
Preceded by Kenneth Clarke	Secretary of State for Health; 1990–1992	Succeeded by Virginia Bottomley
Preceded by Chris Patten	Chancellor of the Duchy of Lancaster; 1992–1994	Succeeded by David Hunt
Preceded by Gillian Shephard	Minister of State for Agriculture, Fisheries and Food; 1994–1995	Succeeded by Douglas Hogg
Preceded by Jonathan Aitken	Chief Secretary to the Treasury; 1995–1997	Succeeded by Alistair Darling
Academic offices
Preceded by John Madejski	Chancellor of the University of Reading; 2016–present	Incumbent
Preceded by Eric Anderson	Provost of Eton; 2009–present	Incumbent
Orders of precedence in the United Kingdom
Preceded by The Lord Harrison	Gentlemen; Baron Waldegrave of North Hill	Followed by The Lord Goldsmith
