= Caroline Waldegrave, Lady Waldegrave of North Hill =

British businesswoman (born 1952)

The Right Honourable The Lady Waldegrave of North Hill OBE
- Born: Caroline Linda Margaret Burrows; 14 August 1952 (age 73)
- Spouse: William Waldegrave, Baron Waldegrave of North Hill (m. 1975)
- Children: 4

Caroline Linda Margaret Waldegrave, Baroness Waldegrave of North Hill, OBE (née Burrows; born 14 August 1952) is managing director of Leiths School of Food and Wine, which she jointly bought with former British Telecom chairman and chairman of the Royal Shakespeare Company, Sir Christopher Bland, in 1994.

== Education ==
Lady Waldegrave was educated at Woldingham School, a Roman Catholic boarding independent school for girls, near the village of Woldingham in Surrey.

== Life and career ==
Waldegrave was principal of Leiths from 1975 to 2002. She has also co-written several cookery books (titles include Leiths Cookery Bible, Leiths Cooking for One or Two, Leiths Easy Dinner Parties, Leiths Seasonal Bible).

It has been announced that she will replace Prue Leith in the spring of 2025 hosting and judging The Great Celebrity Bake Off 2025 for Stand Up To Cancer, joining co-host Paul Hollywood.

== Family ==
Since 1975 she has been married to William Waldegrave, former Conservative politician who served in the Cabinet from 1990 until 1997, and then became a life peer. They have four children: Katie, Liza, Jamie and Harriet.
