= William Waldegrave (Suffolk MP, died 1613) =

English politician

Sir William Waldegrave
- Born: c. 1540
- Died: 25 August 1613
- Spouse(s): (1) Elizabeth Mildmay (2) Grizelda, Lady Rivett
- Parent(s): Sir William Waldegrave, Juliana Raynsford

Sir William Waldegrave (c. 1540 – 25 August 1613) was an English Member of Parliament.

Waldegrave was born into a prosperous and well-connected Suffolk family. He was the only son of Sir William Waldegrave and Juliana, daughter of Sir John Raysnford.

He studied at Lincoln's Inn but was not called to the bar, choosing instead to rely on his large estates in East Anglia for income. Waldegrave was elected Member of Parliament for Suffolk in 1563, and knighted in 1576. He served as Sheriff of Norfolk and Suffolk between 1586 and 1589.

Waldegrave married firstly Elizabeth (d.1581), daughter of Thomas Mildmay, with whom he had six sons and four daughters. He married secondly Grizelda, daughter of William Paget, 1st Baron Paget, and widow of Sir Thomas Rivett.
