= Eric Hussey =

British athlete (1885–1958)

Eric Robert Hussey
- Born: 24 April 1885; Blandford Forum, Dorset
- Died: 19 May 1958 (aged 73)
- Education: Hertford College
- Occupation: Educator
- Employer: Colonial Service
- Known for: Developing British colonial education plans in Uganda and Nigeria
- Notable work: Tropical Africa, 1908-1944, memoirs of a period.
- Title: Director of Education in Nigeria
- Term: 1926 - 1936
- Children: Marmaduke Hussey, Baron Hussey of North Bradley

Eric Hussey
Sport
- Sport: Athletics
- Event: hurdles
- Club: University of Oxford AC; Achilles Club

Eric Robert James Hussey (24 April 1885 – 19 May 1958) was a British colonial administrator and track and field athlete.

Hussey competed in the 1908 Summer Olympics. He was eliminated in the semi-finals of the 110 metres hurdles, after finishing second in his heat.

He was appointed to the colonial Sudan Civil Service in 1908 and taught at Gordon Memorial College. He held various other roles as an educator in Africa and wrote several works on his experiences.

Hussey led the development of colonial educational plans in Sudan and Nigeria, the upgrade of Makerere to become a higher training institution, and the establishment of Yaba College.

== Life ==
Hussey was born in 1885 in Blandford Forum, the son of James Hussey and his wife Martha Ellen Hewitt. His father was a theology graduate of Wadham College and a clergyman in Durweston. Hussey attended Repton School between 1899 and 1904, earning recognition for his athletic achievements, including setting a school record in the 120 yards hurdles. He then gained a scholarship at Hertford College, Oxford, where he became one of the nation's top hurdlers and represented Great Britain in the 1908 Olympics.

=== Career in East Africa ===
Upon graduation, Hussey, who might have been enticed by the generous benefits of colonial service, applied to the Sudan Political Service. He was a model candidate for what Lord Cromer was trying to develop among officers in Sudan, someone with athletic abilities and fair academic results. Hussey was accepted as a tutor within the Sudan Educational Service, firstly working at Gordon College and assisting in the development of a primary education plan. Between 1908 and 1920, Hussey's work in Sudan gained the notice of Geoffrey Archer, an administrator in Somaliland who requested Hussey's advice in the development of primary education within the territory. But many of his recommendations were delayed due to financial difficulties while his effort was admired by Archer, who again requested Hussey to help advise on plans on developing education in Uganda.

Hussey's plan for Uganda was extensive, an effort to restructure an educational system dominated by mission schools that were at times in dispute with each other. He recommended the creation of a Director of Education, a new grants-in-aid structure, an upgrade to Makerere institution to offer professional training courses, and also an upgrade on many mission schools offering primary education. A few intermediate schools will offer a pathway to Makerere. In 1925, he was appointed the first Director of Education in Uganda, and he followed an educational policy to enhance the social and cultural fabric of Ugandan communities. Hussey was able to push through many of his recommendations.

=== Career in Nigeria ===
In 1929, Hussey accepted a position as the First Director of Education following the amalgamation of the North and South protectorates. In 1930, he concluded his report on education plans in Nigeria, partly influenced by the 1926 Hadow report on the education of adolescents. In Nigeria, he sought to limit mission schools to offer nursery and primary education up to standard IV instead of standard VI.

He was unenthusiastic about the quality of education offered to graduates who became eligible for commercial or government work after passing standard VI exams. His plan envisioned an intermediate junior secondary school from standard V to standard VIII and a two-year senior secondary education that would offer courses on craft work. Hussey's interest in increasing the sphere of government in education had some pushback from the missions. His policies followed an adaptation theory of education to instill part of community life and culture in education. However, financial constraints affected a full implementation of his educational plans.

Hussey devoted effort to the establishment of Yaba Higher College and the upgrade of teacher training institutions. Yaba College was opened by Governor Cameron in 1934. Hussey retired from colonial service in 1936.

=== In retirement ===
Hussey joined the National Society for Promoting Religious Education in 1936 and was secretary from late 1936 to 1942. In 1940, he became a member of the Advisory Committee on Education in the Colonies.

Hussey died while living in Cuckfield. He left an estate valued at more than £16,800. equivalent to £341,069 in 2025.

== Family ==
His son Marmaduke Hussey, Baron Hussey of North Bradley was a journalist who became Chairman of the Board of Governors of the BBC.

== See also ==
- Hussey College Warri
