= Sir Edward Waldegrave, 1st Baronet =

English politician and army officer

Sir Edward Waldegrave, 1st Baronet (c. 1568 – c. 1650) was an English politician and army officer who served in the English Civil War.

He was the son of Charles Waldegrave (d. 1632) of Staninghall, Norfolk and Chewton Mendip, Somerset and Jeronima (d. 1627), daughter of Sir Henry Jerningham. In 1599 he married Eleanor (d. 1604), daughter of Sir Thomas Lovell of Harling, Norfolk by whom he had 4 sons and 2 daughters. He subsequently married Frances, daughter of Sir Nicholas Sanderson of Fillingham, Lincolnshire and widow of Francis Copplewick of Belaugh, Norfolk.

Waldegrave was knighted by King James I in 1607. In 1643, he was made a baronet by King Charles I, but the Rump Parliament later declared the creation invalid and it only became effective after the English Restoration. Though aged over seventy when civil war broke out in 1642, Waldegrave commanded a royalist horse regiment in Cornwall and secured the passage through Saltash against the 3rd Earl of Essex's troops, being twice unhorsed but eventually taking forty Roundhead prisoners. Later, when the Royalists were defeated, he was forced to pay £50,000 (approximately £3,700,000 in early-2000s terms) in fines and sequestrations and died soon after.

Baronetage of England
New creation	Baronet (of Hever Castle); 1643–c. 1650	Succeeded by Henry Waldegrave
