= George Waldegrave, 7th Earl Waldegrave =

British peer

George Edward Waldegrave, 7th Earl Waldegrave (8 February 1816 – 28 September 1846) was a British peer.

The eldest legitimate child of the 6th Earl Waldegrave, George Waldegrave was educated at Eton and Christ Church, Oxford. In 1835, he inherited his father's titles and on 28 September 1840, he married his elder, illegitimate brother's widow, Frances (the daughter of noted tenor, John Braham) at Gretna Green, Scotland (in order to avoid the prohibitions of the Marriage Act 1835, which made such marriages in England and Wales illegal).

In 1841, Waldegrave was sentenced to six months imprisonment in Newgate Prison, by the Twickenham Bench of the Assize Court for having drunkenly assaulted a police officer in Kingston upon Thames. His wife and their servants came to live with him there until his release, when they moved back to their home, Strawberry Hill, the "Gothick" mansion and former residence of Horace Walpole in Twickenham, that had passed to Waldegrave's grandmother, Elizabeth.

Heavily in debt and tired of Twickenham, Waldegrave decided to sell Walpole's treasures at their home in 1842 and he and his wife travelled abroad before settling down at their country home of Harptree Court in Somerset, in 1844. Lord Waldegrave died two years later and left the-now derelict Strawberry Hill to his wife. Dying childless, he was succeeded by his uncle, William, and his wife later twice remarried.

Peerage of Great Britain
Preceded by John Waldegrave	Earl Waldegrave; 1835–1846	Succeeded by William Waldegrave
