= William Waldegrave, 9th Earl Waldegrave =

British Conservative politician

The Right Honourable The Earl Waldegrave PC VD
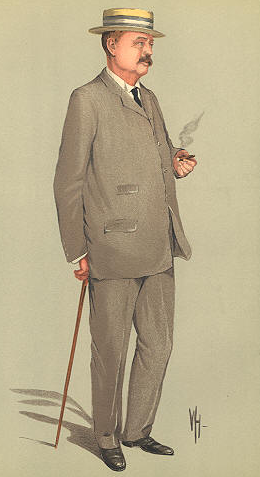
- The Earl Waldegrave, from Vanity Fair, 1912.

Captain of the Yeomen of the Guard
- In office 26 August 1896 – 4 December 1905
- Monarchs: Victoria; Edward VII
- Prime Minister: The Marquess of Salisbury; Arthur Balfour
- Preceded by: The Earl of Limerick
- Succeeded by: The Duke of Manchester

Personal details
- Born: 2 March 1851
- Died: 12 August 1930 (aged 79)
- Party: Conservative
- Spouse: Lady Mary Palmer (1850–1933)
- Children: Lady Mary Waldegrave; Lady Laura Waldegrave; William Waldegrave, 10th Earl Waldegrave
- Parent(s): William Waldegrave, Viscount Chewton; Frances Bastard
- Education: Trinity College, Cambridge

William Frederick Waldegrave, 9th Earl Waldegrave, VD, PC (2 March 1851 – 12 August 1930), styled Viscount Chewton between 1854 and 1859, was a British Conservative politician. He served as Captain of the Yeomen of the Guard, government chief whip in the House of Lords, between 1896 and 1905.

== Background and education ==
Waldegrave was the eldest son of William Waldegrave, Viscount Chewton, eldest son of Vice-Admiral William Waldegrave, 8th Earl Waldegrave. His mother was Frances, daughter of Captain John Bastard. He gained the courtesy title Viscount Chewton in 1854 on the early death of his father. In 1859, aged eight, he succeeded his grandfather in the earldom.

He was educated at Eton and Trinity College, Cambridge. He was a member of the Bath and County Club.

== Military career ==
Waldegrave was commissioned into the 3rd Cambridgeshire Rifle Volunteer Corps in 1869. He was promoted lieutenant in 1870 and resigned his commission as a captain in 1872. He was commissioned an ensign in the 1st London Rifle Volunteer Corps in 1873 and was promoted lieutenant and captain in 1874 and major in 1886. He retired as a lieutenant-colonel.

== Political career ==
Lord Waldegrave sat on the Conservative in the House of Lords. He was a Lord-in-waiting under Lord Salisbury from 1886 to 1892 and again from 1895 to 1896.

After the death of Lord Limerick in August 1896, he was promoted to Captain of the Yeomen of the Guard and Government Chief Whip in the House of Lords. He continued in these posts until 1905, the last three years under the premiership of Arthur Balfour. He remained as Conservative Chief Whip in the House of Lords until 1911.

In 1897 he was sworn of the Privy Council. Waldegrave was appointed a deputy lieutenant of Somerset on 25 January 1911.

== Family ==
Lord Waldegrave married his first cousin, Lady Mary Dorothea Palmer, daughter of Roundell Palmer, 1st Earl of Selborne, on 5 August 1874. He died in August 1930, aged 79, and was succeeded by his eldest son, William. The Countess Waldegrave died in November 1933.

Political offices
Preceded by The Earl of Limerick	Captain of the Yeomen of the Guard; 1896 – 1905	Succeeded by The Duke of Manchester
Preceded by The Earl of Limerick	Government Chief Whip in the House of Lords; 1896 – 1905	Succeeded by The Lord Ribblesdale
Party political offices
Preceded by The Earl of Limerick	Conservative Chief Whip in the House of Lords; 1896 – 1911	Succeeded by The Duke of Devonshire
Peerage of Great Britain
Preceded by William Waldegrave	Earl Waldegrave; 1859 – 1930	Succeeded by William Waldegrave
