= William Waldegrave, 10th Earl Waldegrave =

William Edward Seymour Waldegrave, 10th Earl Waldegrave (2 October 1882 – 30 January 1933) was the son of William Waldegrave, 9th Earl Waldegrave and Lady Mary Dorothea Palmer.

Lord Waldegrave was "an invalid from birth." He died unmarried at age 50 and was succeeded by his uncle, Rev. The Honourable Henry Waldegrave.

Peerage of Great Britain
Preceded by William Waldegrave	Earl Waldegrave; 1930–1933	Succeeded by Henry Waldegrave
