= Woman of the Bedchamber =

Female aide to a queen or queen consort

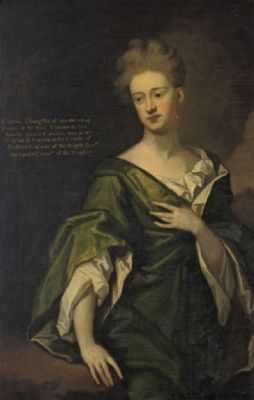
Charlotte Clayton, Baroness Sundon, Woman of the Bedchamber to Queen Caroline

A woman of the bedchamber is a member of the Royal Household of the United Kingdom attending a queen regnant or queen consort in the role of lady-in-waiting. Historically the term 'Gentlewoman of Her Majesty's Bedchamber' was sometimes used. In addition to the women of the bedchamber (usually daughters of peers), queens have ladies of the bedchamber (typically wives or widows of peers above the rank of earl), and a mistress of the robes (usually a duchess) who is the senior female member of her household. The women of the bedchamber are usually in regular attendance, but the mistress of the robes and the ladies of the bedchamber are normally only required for major events and occasions.

== Duties ==
When 'in waiting', a woman of the bedchamber might be expected to accompany the queen on public or semi-private engagements, make purchases on the queen's behalf or other arrangements of a personal nature. She might enquire after the wellbeing of acquaintances who are unwell and sometimes attend memorial services on the queen's behalf. During the reign of Elizabeth II the women of the bedchamber dealt substantially with the queen's private correspondence, and replied to letters on her behalf.

== History ==
Historically, the duties of a woman of the bedchamber were to attend the royal woman and help her bathe, get dressed, undressed, and so forth.

In a description from 1728, a woman of the bedchamber worked independently from the lady of the bedchamber and did not take orders from her. However, if a lady of the bedchamber was present, a woman of the bedchamber would always defer to her. If a lady of the bedchamber was present when a woman of the bedchamber arrived to dress the queen, for example, she would not dress the queen herself, but instead pass the garments to the lady of the bedchamber, who in turn helped the queen put them on. The procedure was the same in other respects.

=== Queen Elizabeth II ===
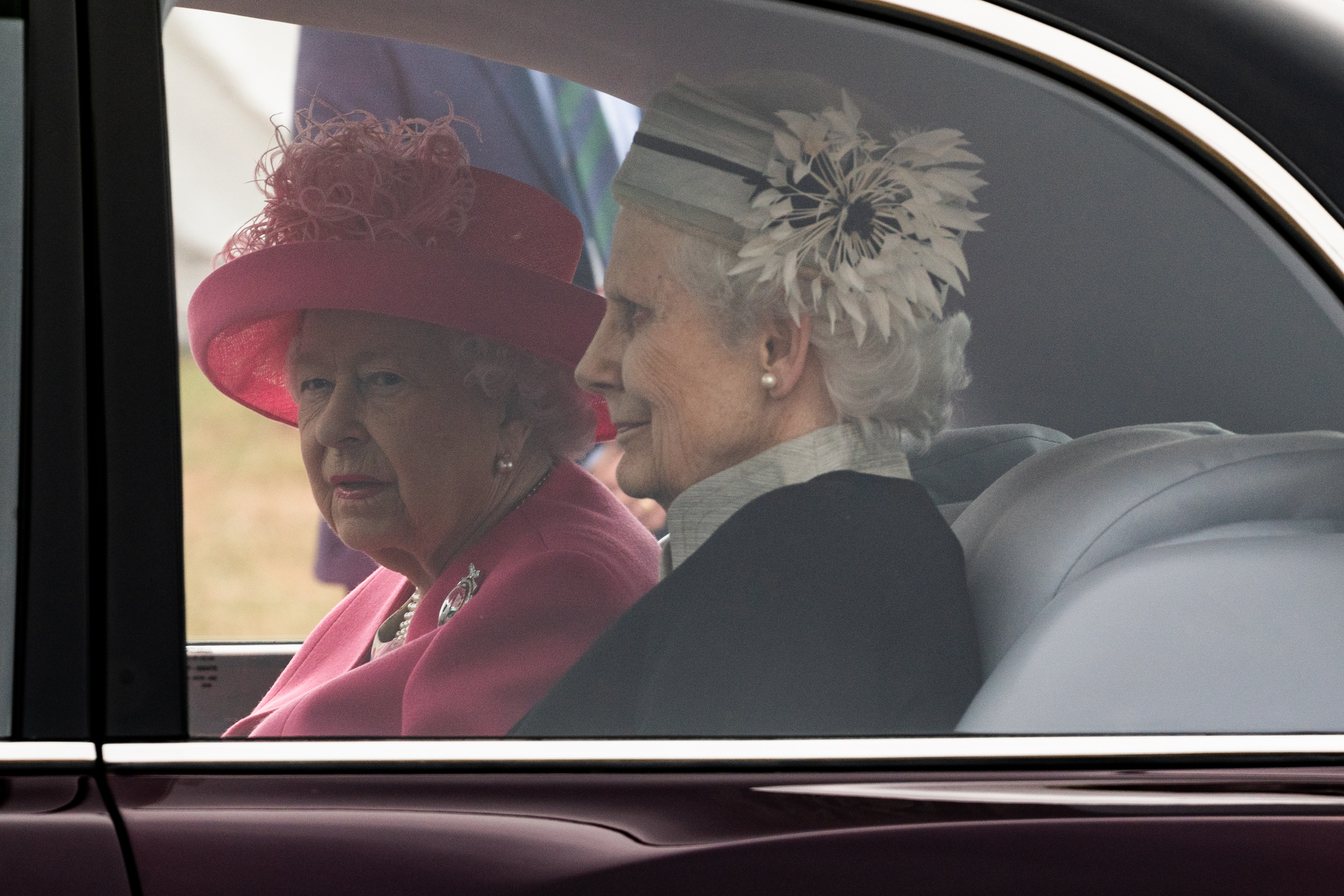
Mary Morrison, who served as a woman of the bedchamber to Queen Elizabeth II from 1960 until the Queen's death in 2022, accompanying the Queen to the national D-Day commemoration in Southsea in 2019

Queen Elizabeth II maintained an establishment of at least four women of the bedchamber, one of whom at a time was usually in attendance. For most of the Queen's reign they served in rotation, remaining on duty for a fortnight at a time, during which period they were referred to as 'Lady-in-Waiting to Her Majesty' or 'Lady-in-Waiting to The Queen'. The establishment was supplemented by 'extra' Women of the Bedchamber, who might take turns on a more occasional basis.

At the time of her death, the women of the bedchamber to Queen Elizabeth II included Lady Susan Hussey and Mary Anne Morrison (both of whom were appointed in 1960) along with Lady Elton and Mrs Robert de Pass (both of whom were appointed in 1987), and Annabel Whitehead and Mrs Michael Gordon Lennox (both of whom were initially appointed in 2002). All continued to take regular turns on duty in the latter years of her reign.

==== List of women of the bedchamber of Elizabeth II ====
Those who served as Women of the Bedchamber to Elizabeth II included:

Years	Name	Notes
1953–1975	Lady Margaret Hay	had served as Lady in Waiting to Princess Elizabeth from 1948
1953–1959	Lady Alice Egerton	had served as Lady in Waiting to Princess Elizabeth from 1949
1953–1972	Lady Rose Baring	Extra Woman of the Bedchamber 1972–1993
	The Hon. Mrs. Andrew Elphinstone (later Mrs. John Woodroffe)	Extra Woman of the Bedchamber 1953–2017 had served as Lady in Waiting to Princess Elizabeth from 1949
1973–1987	Mrs. Alexander (later Lady) Abel Smith	Extra Woman of the Bedchamber 1960–1973 and 1987–2005 had served as Lady in Waiting to Princess Elizabeth 1949–1952
1973–2002	Mrs. John (later Lady) Dugdale	Extra Woman of the Bedchamber 1960–1973
1960–2022	The Hon. Dame Mary Morrison	
1960–2022	Lady Susan Hussey	
	Mrs. Michael (later Dame Anne) Wall	Extra Woman of the Bedchamber 1981–2006 formerly Assistant Press Secretary to the Queen
1987–2022	The Lady Elton	
	Mrs. Robert de Pass	Extra Woman of the Bedchamber 1987–2022
1997–c.2002	Mrs. Christian Adams	Woman of the Bedchamber (Temporary)
1999–2006	Mrs. (later Dame) Fiona Henderson	formerly a Lady in Waiting to Katharine, Duchess of Kent
2002–2022	The Hon. Mrs. Christopher (later Dame Annabel) Whitehead	formerly a Lady in Waiting to Princess Margaret, Countess of Snowdon
2002–2022	Jennifer Susan, Mrs. Michael Gordon Lennox	formerly a Lady in Waiting to Queen Elizabeth the Queen Mother

== See also ==
- Première femme de Chambre, French equivalent
- Chamber Woman, German and Nordic equivalent
- Chamberer, female servant in the bedchamber at Tudor and Stuart courts
