= Geoffrey Waldegrave, 12th Earl Waldegrave =

British peer and agriculturist (1905–1995)

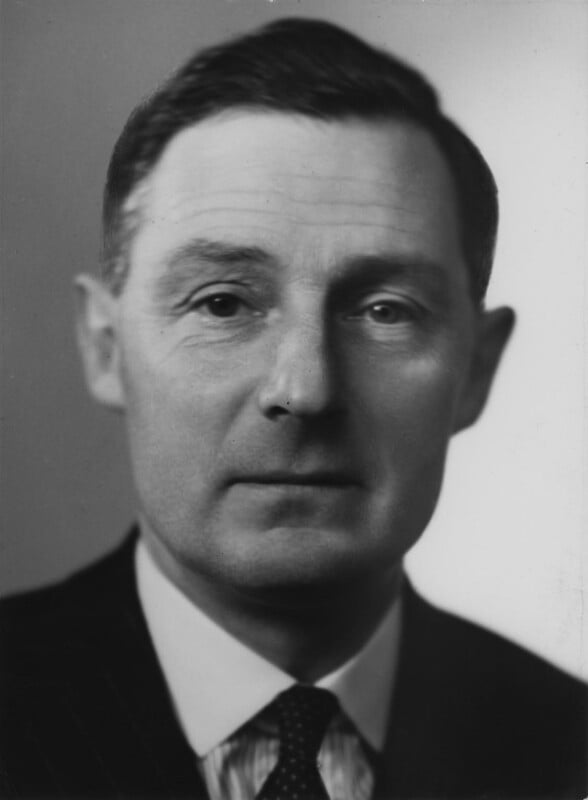
Waldegrave in 1952

Geoffrey Noel Waldegrave, 12th Earl Waldegrave, KG, GCVO, TD (21 November 1905 – 23 May 1995), known as Viscount Chewton from 1933 to 1936, was a British peer and agriculturist.

== Background and education ==
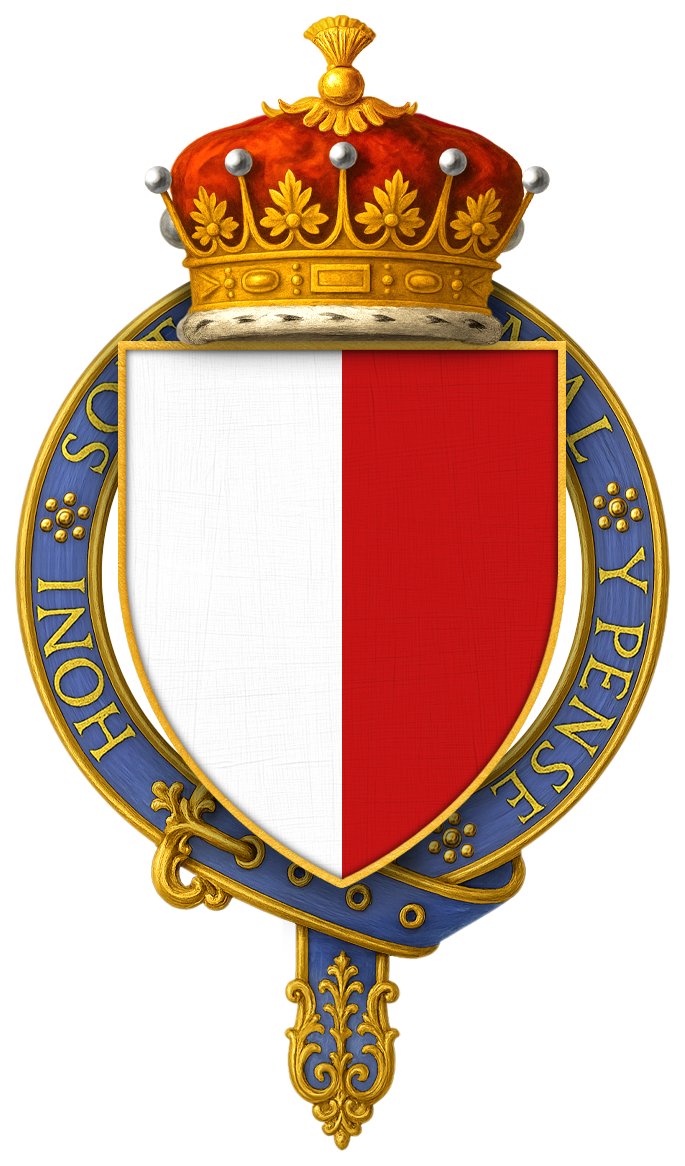
Garter-encircled Arms of Geoffrey Waldegrave, 12th Earl Waldegrave, KG, GCVO, TD

Waldegrave was the only son of the Rev. Henry Waldegrave, 11th Earl Waldegrave and was educated at Winchester and graduated from Trinity College, Cambridge, in 1928.

== Political career ==
In 1936, he succeeded to his father's titles and became a member of Somerset County Council in 1937. During World War II, he served with the Royal Artillery (Territorial Army) and was afterwards awarded the Legion of Merit and the Territorial Decoration.

Lord Waldegrave's career thereafter was as: chairman of the Agricultural Executive Council 1948–51; a member of the Prince's Council of the Duchy of Cornwall 1951–58; and 1965–76; a Liaison Officer of the Ministry of Agriculture, Fisheries and Food to Somerset, Wiltshire and Gloucestershire 1952–57; a Parliamentary Secretary to the Ministry of Agriculture, Fisheries and Food 1958–62; chairman of the Forestry Commission 1963–65; a member of the BBC General Advisory Council 1963–66; a director of Lloyds Bank 1964–76; Lord Warden of the Stannaries 1965–76; chairman of the Advisory Committee on Meat Research 1969–73 and President of Somerset Trust Nature Conservation 1964–80.

In 1976, he was made an Honorary Doctor of Laws by the University of Bristol and was appointed a Knight Companion of the Order of the Garter and a Knight Grand Cross of the Royal Victorian Order in 1971 and 1976, respectively.

== Family ==
In 1930, he married Mary Hermione Grenfell. The couple had two sons – James Waldegrave, 13th Earl Waldegrave and William Waldegrave, Baron Waldegrave of North Hill – and five daughters, including Lady Susan Hussey.

== Arms ==
Coat of arms of Geoffrey Waldegrave, 12th Earl Waldegrave
Crest Out of a ducal coronet Or a plume of five ostrich feathers the first two Argent the third per pale Argent and Gules the last two Gules. Escutcheon Per pale Argent and Gules. Supporters On either side a talbot Sable, ears Or, gorged with a mural crown Argent. Motto Passes avant (Press forward) Orders Most Noble Order of the Garter (Knight Companion)

Political offices
Preceded by The Earl St Aldwyn and Joseph Godber	Joint Parliamentary Secretary to MAFF with Joseph Godber 1957–60, William Fletcher-Vane 1960–62; 1958–62	Succeeded by The Lord St Oswald and James Scott-Hopkins
Court offices
Preceded by The Earl of Radnor	Lord Warden of the Stannaries; 1965–76	Succeeded by The Marquess of Lothian
Peerage of Great Britain
Preceded by Henry Waldegrave	Earl Waldegrave; 1936–1995	Succeeded by James Waldegrave
