= William Waldegrave, 8th Earl Waldegrave =

British naval commander and politician (1788-1859)

Vice-Admiral The Right Honourable The Earl Waldegrave CB

Member of Parliament for Bedford
- In office 1815–1818 Serving with Lord George Russell
- Preceded by: Samuel Whitbread; Lord George Russell
- Succeeded by: Lord George Russell; William Henry Whitbread

Personal details
- Born: 27 October 1788
- Died: 24 October 1859 (aged 70)
- Spouse(s): Elizabeth Whitbread Sarah Milward (m. 1846)
- Parents: George Waldegrave (father); Lady Elizabeth Waldegrave (mother)
- Relatives: William Waldegrave, Viscount Chewton (son); William Waldegrave, 9th Earl
- Education: Eton College
- Military career
- Allegiance: United Kingdom
- Branch: Royal Navy
- Service years: 1801–1846
- Rank: Vice-Admiral
- Commands: HMS Melpomene; HMS Macedonian; HMS Seringapatam; HMS Revenge
- Conflicts: Napoleonic Wars; Action of 5 October 1804; War of 1812; Egyptian-Ottoman War; Bombardment of Acre

Vice-Admiral William Waldegrave, 8th Earl Waldegrave, CB (27 October 1788 – 24 October 1859) was a British naval commander and politician.

== Biography ==
Waldegrave was the son of George Waldegrave, 4th Earl Waldegrave and his wife, the former Lady Elizabeth Laura Waldegrave. His parents were first cousins. He was educated at Eton. In 1802, he became a Midshipman in the Royal Navy, rising to the ranks of Lieutenant in 1806 and Commander in 1809. He fought during the War of 1812, commanding frigate HMS Macedonian (which was later captured by the United States).

On his return to England, he married Elizabeth Whitbread, the daughter of Samuel Whitbread and took over from his father-in-law's post as Member of Parliament (MP) for Bedford in 1815.

Leaving that post in 1818, Waldegrave then commanded HMS Seringapatam from 1829 to 1832 and HMS Revenge from 1839 to 1842 and was created a Companion of the Order of the Bath in 1840.

He retired from the navy in 1846 as a rear-admiral, inherited his childless nephew's titles in 1846 and was married for a second time that year, to Sarah Milward, née Whitear. He was promoted to Vice-Admiral in 1858 and died a year later, at age 70. His eldest son, William Waldegrave, Viscount Chewton had died in 1854 and he was succeeded by his grandson, William.

== Ancestry ==
Ancestors of William Waldegrave, 8th Earl Waldegrave

Henry Waldegrave, 1st Baron Waldegrave
James Waldegrave, 1st Earl Waldegrave
Henrietta FitzJames
John Waldegrave, 3rd Earl Waldegrave
Sir John Webb, 3rd Baronet
Mary Webb
Barbara Belasyse
George Waldegrave, 4th Earl Waldegrave
Sir John Leveson-Gower, 1st Baron Gower
John Leveson-Gower, 1st Earl Gower
Catherine Manners
Lady Elizabeth Leveson-Gower
Evelyn Pierrepont, 1st Duke of Kingston-upon-Hull
Lady Evelyn Pierrepont
Mary Feilding
William Waldegrave, 8th Earl Waldegrave
Henry Waldegrave, 1st Baron Waldegrave
James Waldegrave, 1st Earl Waldegrave
Henrietta FitzJames
James Waldegrave, 2nd Earl Waldegrave
Sir John Webb, 3rd Baronet
Mary Webb
Barbara Belasyse
Elizabeth Laura Waldegrave, Countess Waldegrave
Sir Robert Walpole
Sir Edward Walpole
Catherine Shorter
Maria Walpole
Hammond Clement
Dorothy Clement
Priscilla

== Citations ==
Parliament of the United Kingdom
Preceded by Samuel Whitbread; Lord George Russell	Member of Parliament for Bedford; 1815–1818; With: Lord George Russell	Succeeded by Lord George Russell; William Henry Whitbread
Peerage of Great Britain
Preceded by George Waldegrave	Earl Waldegrave; 1846-1859	Succeeded by William Waldegrave
