= Mayfield Park, Southampton =

Public Park in Woolston, Southampton

Coordinates: 50°53′30.19″N 1°21′51.09″W

Mayfield Park
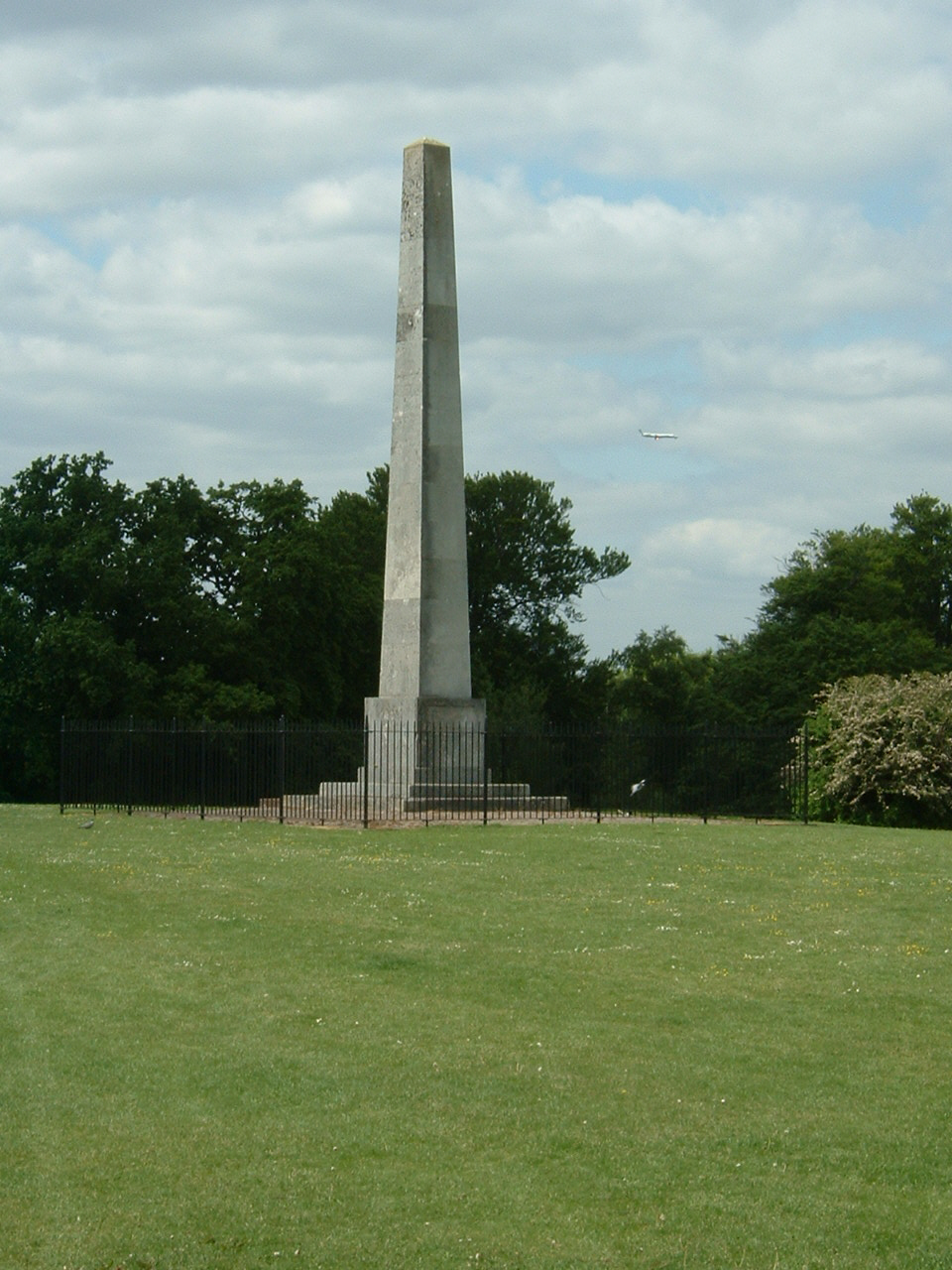
- The memorial to Charles James Fox

- Location within Southampton
- Type: Public park
- Location: Woolston, Southampton, England
- Area: 17 ha (42 acres)
- Operator: Southampton City Council
- Open: Open year-round
- Awards: Green Flag Award
- Paths: Itchen Way
- Website: Official website

Mayfield Park is a recreational area straddling Woolston and Weston in Southampton, England. The stream that runs through the park is the boundary between the two districts of modern Southampton.

The park is owned and maintained by Southampton City Council. It was previously part of the Chamberlayne family's Weston Grove estate. Much of the rest of the Weston Grove estate has been used to develop the post-war suburb of Weston. Mayfield Park survives because it was split from the Weston Grove estate in the nineteenth century, becoming the Mayfield Estate.

== History ==
=== 18th century: wood-working mill ===
The park straddles a stream which runs from nearby Miller's Pond, through a valley within the park, naturally draining the higher ground of the Hampshire Basin on the East of Southampton into Southampton Water. In 1762, Walter Taylor built a water-powered wood-working mill alongside this stream. Millers pond was formed to provide a reservoir to supply this mill.

The mill site was rebuilt as a private house in the 19th century, but this suffered bomb damage during World War II and was abandoned. The site has subsequently been excavated by Southampton City Council's Archeological Unit.

=== 19th century: politics ===
The park was previously part of William Chamberlayne's Weston Grove Estate. In 1810, Chamberlayne erected a memorial to Whig politician Charles James Fox. This takes the form of a Portland stone Obelisk, situated on the highest point of the estate where a windmill once stood. Chamberlayne was later to become MP for the Southampton constituency, from 1818 to 1830.

In 1854, Thomas Chamberlayne sold part of the estate to Col. Robert Wright (after whom nearby Wrights Hill was named), who built Mayfield House there, establishing the Mayfield Estate. Col Wright subsequently dedicated the Obelisk to two of his favourite horses, who are buried in the park.

From 1889 to 1913, Mayfield House and the estate was owned by Granville Augustus William Waldegrave, 3rd Lord Radstock. He had previously worked as a missionary in Russia in the 1870s. During his tenure of the Mayfield Estate Lord Radstock added the inscription to the Obelisk, which reads "The earth is the Lord's and the fullness thereof – Psalms 24.1"

=== 20th century: wartime, development and the end of a dynasty ===
On the death of the 3rd Lord Radstock, in 1913, the title and the Mayfield estate passed to Granville George Waldegrave, 4th Baron Radstock (1859–1937).

During World War I, Mayfield House was used to nurse wounded soldiers, serving as an annexe to the Royal Victoria Military Hospital at Netley.

The consequences of World War I meant that many such estates in England were never the same again. A generation of young men were lost in the conflict, including the younger heirs to these estates and many of the men who worked in them.

On the death of the 4th Lord Radstock, in 1937, the title was inherited by his 70-year-old brother Montague Waldegrave, 5th Baron Radstock(1867–1953). As the family was no longer able to maintain the Mayfield estate, it was sold to Southampton City Council. A covenant in the 4th Barons will requires it to be kept as an open space

During World War II, displaced residents of Southampton were temporarily housed in Mayfield House. This building had 40 rooms, 23 of which were bedrooms

In 1944, the area was used to assemble troops and equipment during the build-up to D-Day.

Southampton City Council used part of the Weston Grove Estate to meet the demand for new housing after World War II, creating the Weston Housing Estate. Weston Park Boys and Girls schools were built in 1957.

The title died out with the 5th Lord Radstock in 1953. Mayfield House was demolished a few years later, in 1956.

=== Legacy ===
Chamberlayne Road, Radstock Road, Wrights Hill, Gordon Terrace, Tankerville Road (named after Tankerville Chamberlayne), Weston Grove Road, Obelisk Road and The Obelisk public house can all be found locally to Mayfield Park.

An annexe to Woolston School, situated in Portsmouth Road, was also named Mayfield House. This building was not the original house on the Mayfield Estate, it merely shared its name.

The Chamberlayne Leisure Centre was opened in April 2000.

Weston Park Boys school has been renamed the Grove Park Business and Enterprise College and more recently Oasis Academy Mayfield

Weston Park Girls school was renamed the Chamberlayne Park School and then Chamberlayne College for the Arts. However the school is now known as Weston Secondary School.

== See also ==
- Baron Radstock
- Waldegrave family
- Oasis Academy Mayfield
