= Granville Waldegrave =

Granville Waldegrave may refer to:

- Granville Waldegrave, 2nd Baron Radstock (1786–1857)
- Granville Waldegrave, 3rd Baron Radstock (1833–1913)
- Granville Waldegrave, 4th Baron Radstock (1859–1937)
