= Weston Secondary School =

Location
- Tickleford Drive; Weston; Southampton, Hampshire, SO19 9QP; England
- Coordinates: 50°53′16″N 1°21′31″W

Information
- Type: Academy
- Established: 1957
- Local authority: Southampton
- Department for Education URN: 147676 Tables
- Ofsted: Reports
- Head teacher: David Butterworth
- Gender: Coeducational
- Age: 11 to 16
- Enrolment: 900
- Website: westonsecondary.co.uk

Weston Secondary School is a coeducational secondary school located in the Weston area of Southampton, in the English county of Hampshire.

== History ==
Weston Park Girls' School opened in 1957. Nearby was Weston Park Boys' School, later Grove Park Business and Enterprise College and then in September 2008 closed along with Woolston School Language College to make way for Oasis Academy Mayfield.

Previous School Logo

It was decided that Weston Park from 1993 the school would admit both boys and girls. The last all girl year group left in 1997 and the school was renamed to Chamberlayne Park Secondary School after the Chamberlayne family who donated the land for the school to be built on. Starting from September 2008 the school was rebranded as Chamberlayne College for the Arts to reflect its specialist status in the Performing Arts.

In 2017 Ofsted judged the school to be Inadequate. After re-inspection in 2018, this judgement was overturned and the school was judged as ‘Requires Improvement’ with leadership aspects judged as ‘Good’.

Previously a foundation school administered by Southampton City Council, in September 2021 Chamberlayne College for the Arts converted to academy status, and was later renamed Weston Secondary School. The school is now sponsored by the Hamwic Education Trust.

=== Buildings ===
A number of additional buildings have been added to the school's aging main building. These have tended to be specialist facilities, such as Science labs, Performing Arts studios and Technology workshops

| Date | Subject Areas | Named after and opened by |
|---|---|---|
| ? | Art, Technology | N/A |
| May 1999 | Science, Library, ICT | Patrick Moore |
| September 2000 | Music, Dance, Drama | Darcey Bussell |
| September 2003 | English, Maths | Emma Richards |

The school was to be completely rebuilt under the Building Schools for the Future programme. The plans included provision for twelve pupils with physical disabilities. A draft plan for the new build was released on 24 October 2009, with the hope work would begin in early 2012. On 5 July 2010 the Secretary of State for Education, Michael Gove, announced that the Building Schools for the Future programme was to be scrapped. BSF projects which had not achieved the status of 'financial close', including Chamberlayne, would not proceed.

The school is currently planning a major re-design, aiming to take place in 2021.

Part of the School Radio Station

== Curriculum ==
=== Performing arts ===
In September 2006 the school became a performing arts school. This means the school gets extra money to spend on Dance, Drama and Music. The school gained an Artsmark award in 2001. In 2004 Ofsted said the school had 'a very strong provision for the performing arts'. From September 2009, the Higher Creative Media Diploma has been available.

== Extracurricular activities ==
- The school has a young carers group.
- Territory Mapping, a 'Future Mapping' careers program.
- Faith and Football Business Enterprise Challenge - in 2008 the school team won the 'Business Drive' award. The 2009 team EnviROM, raised £2000 and won the competition, selling educational environmental discs.
- The school has a radio station accessible through the internet. From September 2008 this was expanded to be a 'real' radio station broadcasting through speakers in the school playground and hall during break times.
- There is a Bullying Intervention Group (BIG) which was involved in an anti-bullying Bullies Aren't Sharp so What's the Point? video.

=== Rock Challenge ===
Since 2004, the school has participated in the Southampton heats of Rock Challenge UK.

| Date | Title | Position | Awards |
|---|---|---|---|
| 3 March 2010 | Alien Nation | 2nd | Award for Press Coverage; Award for School Community Support; Hampshire County Council Award for Choreography; Hampshire County Council Award for Make-up Design; Tega Award for Lighting Design |
| 4 March 2009 | This is Rock 'n Roll | 3rd | Hampshire Children's Services Award for Best Performance Skill; Isle of Wight Youth Inclusion Forum Award for Best Set Design and Staging; Hampshire Police Authority Award for Spirit of Rock Challenge |
| 5 March 2008 | At What Cost? | 3rd | Southampton City Council Award for Best Set Design; Hampshire Constabulary Performers' Choice Award (Emily Hansford); Southampton City Council Award for Best Lighting Design; Award for Media Management; Award for School Community Support |
| 14 March 2007 | | 2nd | Connexions South Central Award for Best Set Design and Staging; Isle of Wight Healthy Schools Award for Concept Originality; Hampshire Drug and Alcohol Action Team Award for Achievement in Drug Awareness; Award for Media Management; Award for School Community Support; Southampton Drug and Alcohol Action Team Award for Healthy Lifestyle; Gemma Dale Unsung Hero Award (to Sam Pickard); National Open Award for Concept Interpretation; National award for Achievement in Drug Awareness; National award for Healthy Lifestyle |
| 1 March 2006 | | 2nd | Best Set Design and Staging; Best Choreography; Achievement in Drug Awareness; Media Management; School Community Support; Healthy Lifestyle |
| 3 March 2005 | | 2nd | Best Set Design & Staging; Most Entertaining Performance; Best Achievement in Drug Awareness |
| 3 March 2004 | Rhythmic Conflict: Earth v Pollution | (Not in top 3) | Constabulary Best Concept Originality Award; Isle of Wight Healthy Schools; Best Lighting Design Award; Gosport Borough Council Media Management Award |
