= Admiral Waldegrave =

Admiral Waldegrave may refer to:

- Granville Waldegrave, 2nd Baron Radstock (1786–1857), British Royal Navy vice admiral
- William Waldegrave, 1st Baron Radstock (1753–1825), British Royal Navy admiral
- William Waldegrave, 8th Earl Waldegrave (1788–1859) was a British Royal Navy vice admiral
