= John Waldegrave =

John Waldegrave may refer to:

- John Waldegrave (Royal Navy officer) (1905–1944), British naval commander during World War II
- John Waldegrave, 3rd Earl Waldegrave (1718–1784), British politician and soldier
- John Waldegrave, 6th Earl Waldegrave (1785–1835), British peer and soldier
