= Woolston, Southampton =

Suburb of Southampton, England

Coordinates: 50°53′35″N 1°22′35″W

Woolston
- Suburb
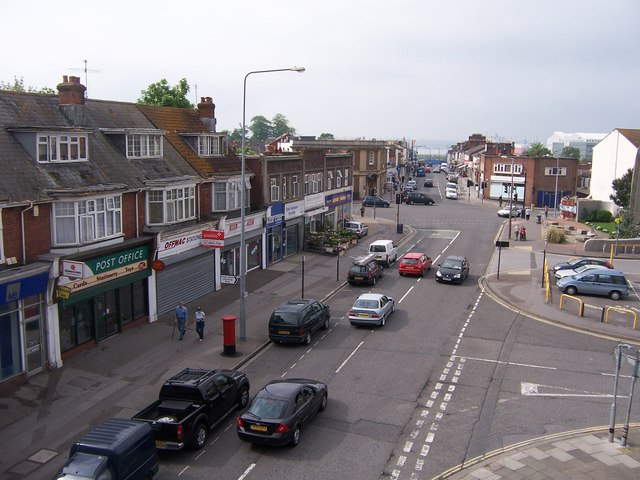
- Shops on Bridge Road

- Location within Southampton
- Population: 13,852 (2011 Census. Ward)
- Unitary authority: Southampton
- Ceremonial county: Hampshire
- Region: South East
- Country: England
- Sovereign state: United Kingdom
- Post town: SOUTHAMPTON
- Postcode district: SO19
- Dialling code: 023
- Police: Hampshire and Isle of Wight
- Fire: Hampshire and Isle of Wight
- Ambulance: South Central
- UK Parliament: Southampton Itchen

Woolston is a suburb of Southampton, located on the eastern bank of the River Itchen. It is bounded by the River Itchen, Sholing, Peartree Green, Itchen and Weston.

The area has a strong maritime and aviation history. The former hamlet grew as new industries, roads and railways came to the area in the Victorian era with Woolston formally incorporated into the borough of Southampton in 1920.

== History ==
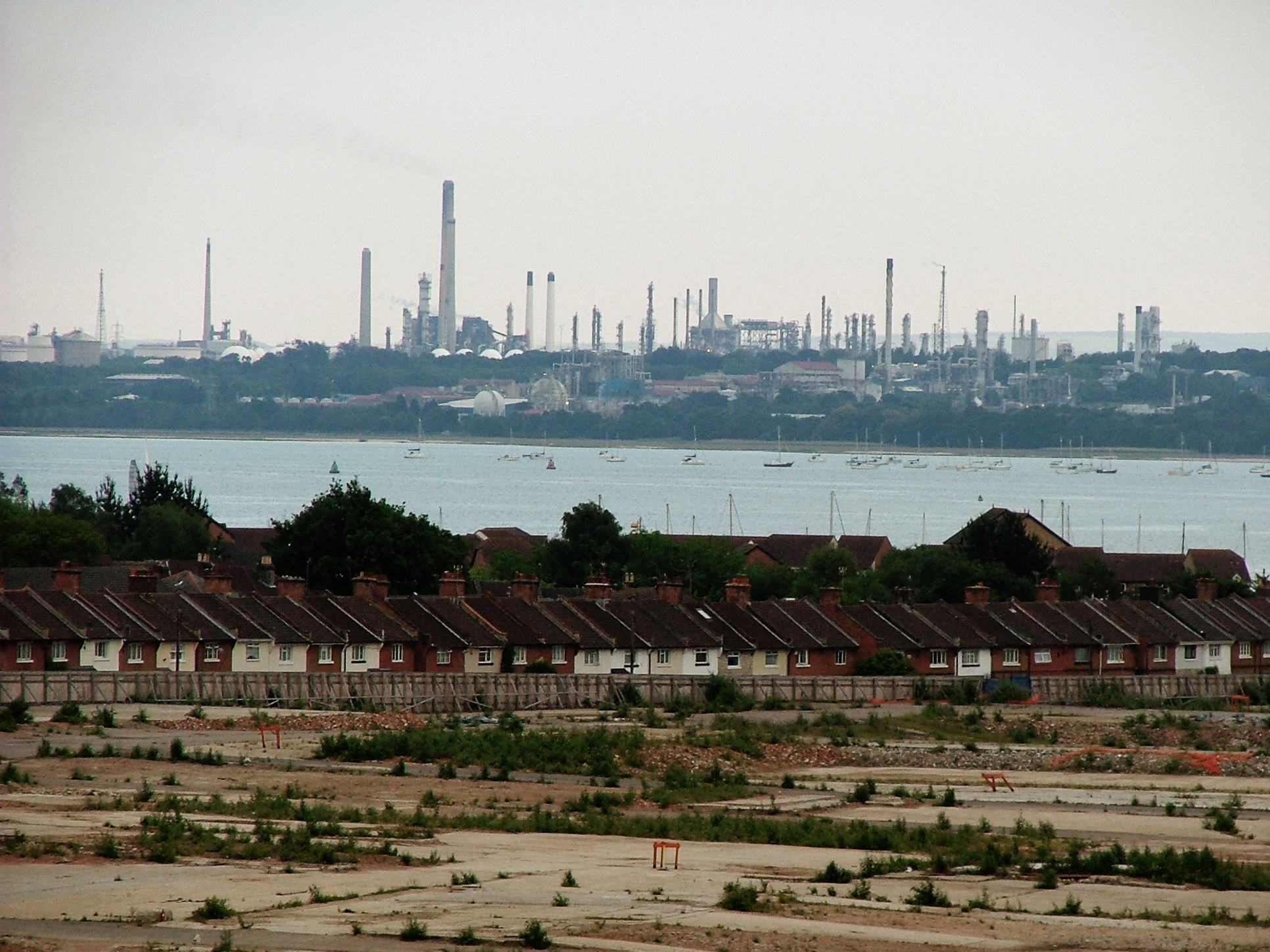
View over the site of the shipyard and Southampton Water to Fawley

Woolston is believed to originate from Olafs tun, a fortified tun on the East bank of the River Itchen established by the Viking leader Olaf I of Norway in the 10th Century. In the Domesday Book of 1086, the area is recorded as Olvestune.

The former hamlet grew as new industries, roads and railways came to the area in the Victorian era with Woolston formally incorporated into the borough of Southampton in 1920. First-class cricket was briefly played at Woolston at Day's Itchen Ground by Hampshire from 1848 to 1850; the ground was leased on land owned by the Woolston Hotel, today known as The Cricketers Arms, on Portsmouth Road.

Development of the Itchen Bridge in the 1970s, to link Woolston with the Southampton City Centre, required significant changes. Old terraces had to be demolished to make room for the new structure. However, as the bus terminal that served passengers boarding and departing the Woolston ferry was no longer required, it was demolished and made way for houses to be built.

In the 21st century, Woolston's Vosper Thorneycroft shipyard closed and a new development, Centenary Quay, was built on the site.

== Governance ==
Before 1920, Woolston was governed as part of the Itchen Urban District, from when it became part of Southampton, which later achieved city status and then became a unitary authority, governed by Southampton City Council.

Woolston is within the Woolston ward which also includes the neighbouring Weston. The ward elects three councillors to the city council, currently all Labour members. Many locations generally considered part of Woolston, including the railway station and the Millennium Garden, are in the neighbouring Peartree ward.

The Woolston ward is within the Southampton Itchen parliamentary constituency, represented in the House of Commons by Darren Paffey of the Labour Party since 2024.

Prior to Brexit in 2020, the area was represented in the European Parliament within the South East England constituency.

== Geography ==
Woolston is bounded by Sholing, Peartree Green, Itchen and Weston; with the western boundary as the River Itchen. Its boundary with Weston is the stream that runs through Mayfield Park.

The nearest motorway is the M27; Woolston is closest to Junctions 7 and 8.

== Economy ==
Woolston has a shopping area centred on the Victoria Rd/Portsmouth Rd crossroads and by the Woolston Floating Bridge.

There had been a shipbuilding site on Victoria Road since 1870, (from 1900 the Vosper Thornycroft shipbuilding company) which was the major employer in Woolston until 31 March 2004 when operations were relocated to Portsmouth.

A large 'supermarket style' Co-op was opened on Victoria Road in April 2004, to replace a smaller ageing shop on the same road. On Saturday 23 May 2015, the large Co-op was shut down and the building sold to Lidl, which opened in February 2017.

=== Woolston Riverside Regeneration ===
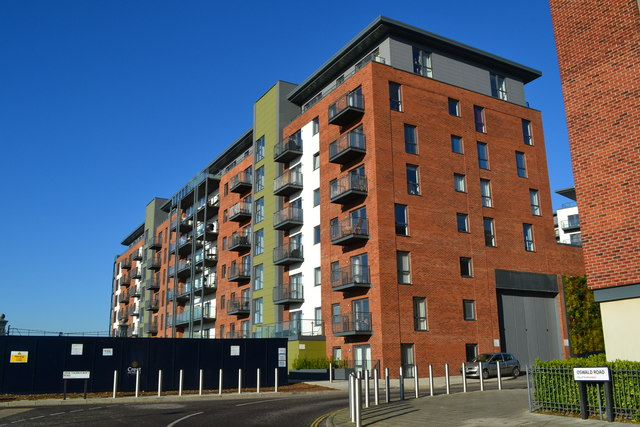
Centenary Quay development

The Victoria Road shipyard site was acquired by the South East England Development Agency (SEEDA) in March 2003. and finally vacated by Vosper Thorneycroft March 2004.

The South East England Development Agency subsequently announced plans for the site, to be split into two sections:

- A residential and retail area, under the brand name Centenary Quay.
- 8.2 hectares for a marine employment quarter at the north of the site providing 820 jobs. This sector will also include an 'upper tier budget hotel'.

The marine and commercial section will include several quays for vessels:

Feature	Description
North Quay	specialist working quay for repair and refit of vessels up to 75 m
Centenary Quay	main commercial quayside housing vessels up to 76 m.
Central Basin	working area focused around a large hoist dock or lift with associated pontoon berthing.
South Quay	new pier to accommodate feature vessels up to 65 m.

The redevelopment of the waterside site may rejuvenate the shopping area, but has also been predicted to place extra burden on the Itchen Bridge and cause extra congestion in Woolston. Developers of the residential site are reported to be considering the possibility of re-introducing a ferry service to Southampton.

Work started on phase one of the Centenary Quay development July 2010. Phase one consists of creating family housing to the east of the site, as well as establishing a frontage to Victoria Road.

Houses have already been built on the land at Weston Shore where the Royal Navy stores once stood. Clearing that brownfield site was a major exercise, complicated by old munitions, including Mustard Gas shells which had been buried in the ground and asbestos. The redeveloped area is now in the district of Woolston

Woolston is thus becoming more of a residential area, though it will still retain some marine industry with facilities to berth vessels of up to 76 m in length.

== Landmarks ==
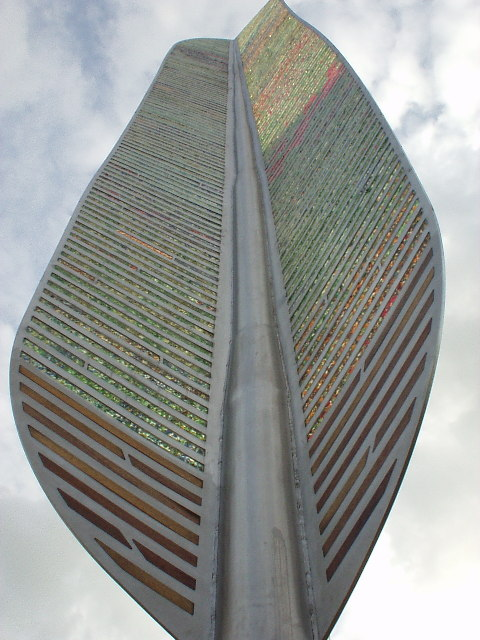
Millennium Feather

The Woolston Millennium Garden was created for the residents by a local group. It was completed in 2002. Its focal point is a 10-metre tall metal and recycled glass feather intended to signify Woolston's history of flight and sail. The garden is divided into three areas, signifying the earth, the sky and the sea. Many of the crew of the Titanic came from Woolston and there are bricks in the pathway through the garden that are inscribed with their names.

Centenary Quay also has Southamptons tallest building, on the edge of Woolston.

== Education ==
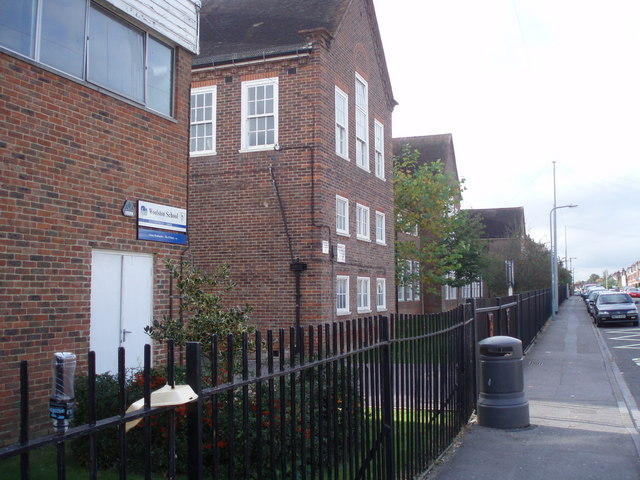
Woolston School, October 2007

St. Mark's Infants school in Church Road moved to new premises in Florence Road in 1974, becoming Woolston First School and is now known as Woolston Infant School. Ludlow Infant School is situated on the same site as Ludlow Junior School, the largest Southampton primary school with 600 pupils.

Woolston no longer provides education for pupils over the age of eleven, since Woolston School was controversially closed in July 2008 to make way for the Oasis Academy Mayfield.

Southampton City College operates a Marine Skills Centre on Hazel Road which runs vocational courses (usually for 16+ pupils).

== Religious sites ==
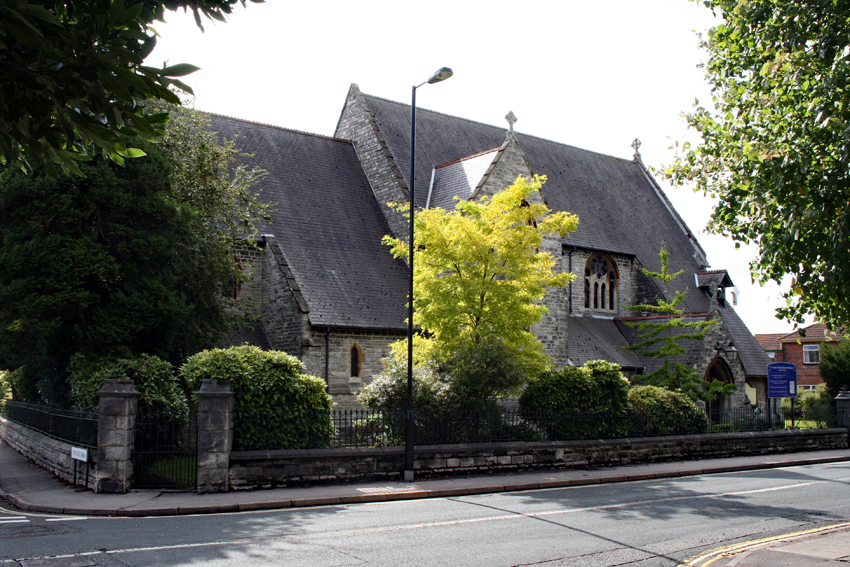
St Mark's church, Woolston

Woolston has three Christian places of worship. St. Mark's Church, built in 1863 and a Grade II listed building, serves the Church of England community; St. Patrick's Church, built in 1884 serves the Roman Catholic community (the site also houses a catholic primary school). There is also a Kingdom Hall operated by Jehovah's Witnesses.

St. Mary's Presbyterian Church was built in 1876 but was demolished in 1972.

== Leisure and community ==
The Archery Grounds, bounded by Swift Road and Archery Road, consists of a large grass space, with a children's play area. There is a path leading through to Mayfield Park, a partially wooded, partially open recreational area situated on the border of Woolston and neighbouring Weston.

The building that was previously St. Mark's Infants School in Church Road is now Woolston Community Centre.

== Public services ==
The fire station in Portsmouth Road was no longer required once the Itchen Bridge provided easy access for the fire crews at St Mary's on the Southampton side of the river. That old building is now a Doctors' surgery.

Across the road, there are two more doctors surgeries – Woolston Lodge Surgery and Canute Surgery – and a Lloyds pharmacy.

== Transport ==
Woolston railway station is on the West Coastway Line, situated at the end of the Itchen Bridge and operated by South Western Railway. The line from Southampton to Woolston was opened on 5 March 1866, accessible from Bridge Road, with an extension opened in November 1867 to serve the Royal Victoria Military Hospital at Netley, where it originally terminated. The line was extended to Fareham on 2 September 1889, whereupon it became possible to run through trains to Portsmouth via a separate line that had been built to link Eastleigh and Gosport in 1841.

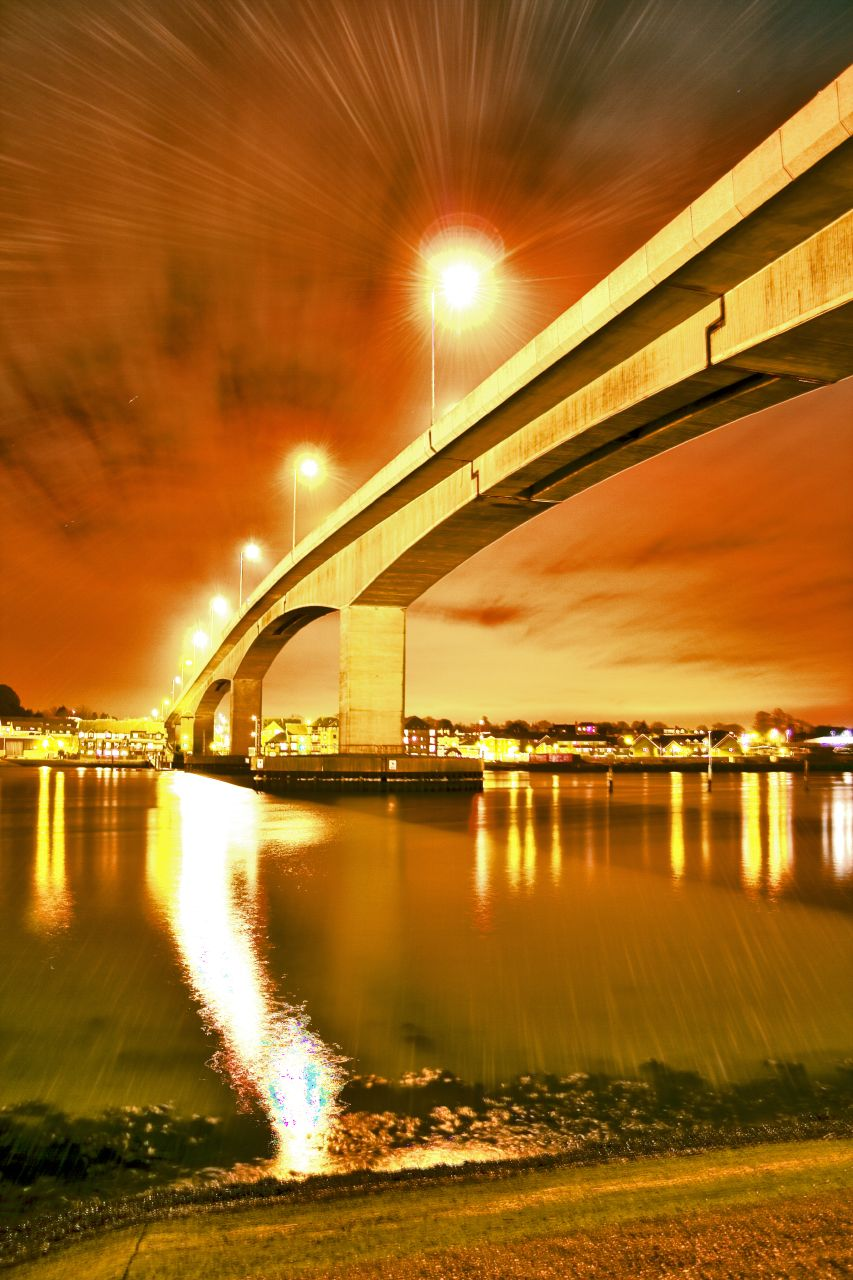
The Itchen Bridge

The Itchen Bridge is a toll bridge that crosses the River Itchen, from Woolston to the Chapel area of Southampton near Ocean Village and St Mary's Stadium. The bridge was opened to traffic on 1 June 1977 and formally named on 13 June 1977 by Princess Alexandra. Costing £5.7 million, the high-level concrete bridge spans 107 m between its central pillars and carries two lanes of traffic 24 m above the river, allowing large vessels to proceed further upstream to the wharfs and quays in Northam. Tolls are charged for vehicles crossing the bridge, toll booths and a control room are situated at the Woolston end. Buses, pedestrians, cyclists and motorcyclists cross free. A cable ferry served Woolston from 1938 until the opening of the bridge. Prior to the Woolston Floating Bridge, the Itchen ferry boats provided transport across the River Itchen.

There is a major bus stop on the Woolston link road, a separate bus-only access to the Itchen Bridge which by-passes the toll booths, served by a number of bus routes running through the suburb.
