= Walter Taylor (engineer) =

- Born: 1734; Southampton, England
- Died: 23 April 1803; Southampton, England
- Parents: Walter Taylor; Elizabeth Silver
- Engineering career
- Discipline: Marine engineer
- Significant design: Mass-produced wooden rigging blocks

Walter Taylor (1734–1803) of Southampton, supplied wooden rigging blocks and ship's pumps to the Royal Navy, greatly improving their quality and reliability via technological innovations which were a significant step forward in the Industrial Revolution.

Walter Taylor was born in 1734 the son of Walter Taylor of Southampton, an ingenious ship's carpenter, and Elizabeth Silver of Whippingham, Isle of Wight. From the age of 14 Taylor served as an apprentice to a Mr Messer, a ship's block maker in Westgate Street, Southampton. Whilst serving at sea his father had observed the problems caused by these blocks, which were traditionally handmade. On his return from sea he visited every blockmaker's shop he could find, and closely observed how blocks were formerly made.

On acquiring the blockmaking business, at Messer's death in 1754, Taylor and his father developed hand-powered sawing, boring and turning machinery to mass-produce the rigging blocks, repeatedly and to an exact specification. As the original premises proved inadequate they acquired adjacent premises in Bugle Street where they installed a horse gin with power transferred from the main wheel through friction wheels on roller-bearing mounted steel countershafts with leather belt drives to the machinery.

Encouraged by Hans Stanley, MP for Southampton and one of the Lords of the Admiralty, they submitted a specimen set of their blocks to the Board of Ordnance. A trial of the blocks in 1761 was so successful that the Navy agreed to take all of his stock of blocks. The navy also decided to order their blocks from Taylor's manufactory rather than setting up their own.

When his father died, in 1762, he continued the business and a patent for the machinery they had developed was taken out in his mother's name. In a field trial in 1762 Captain Bentinck had his ship, HMS Centaur, equipped with Taylor's blocks of half the usual size. These proved fully effective, cheaper and reduced the weight on the masts alone by 26cwt. With the support of the Navy Board Taylor managed to overcome bankruptcy brought on by his father's expenses in developing the machinery.

Following a fire, at Portsmouth Dockyard in July 1770, which destroyed most of the navy's stock of blocks, Taylor received an order to replace them as quickly as possible and it was agreed to replace them with the smaller blocks tested by Bentinck.

Taylor subsequently established a sawmill on a stream that runs through what is now Mayfield Park in Southampton. In 1781, he moved to Woodmill, Swaythling, Southampton where there was a better supply of water and room to power some of the equipment by steam engines. Taylor continued to make improvements to his blocks and diversified into the manufacture of ship's pumps and several non-nautical applications.

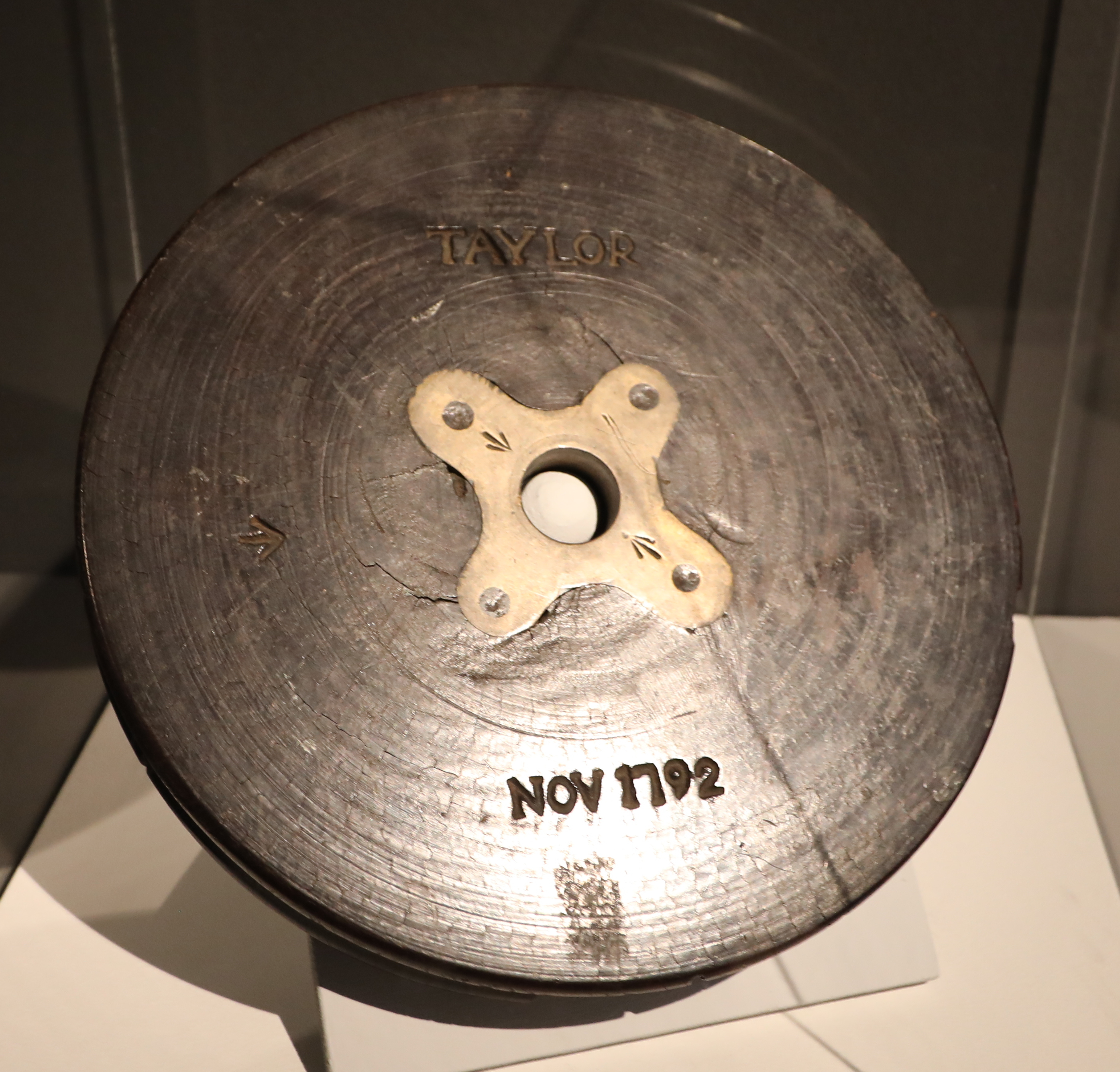
A block made at Walter Taylor's Mill

Taylor was sole supplier of blocks to the Royal Navy from 1759, supplying 100,000 blocks a year, Subsequent developments led to the date stamping of blocks, and a commitment to replace any that failed.

In 1801 Marc Isambard Brunel took out a patent for the manufacture of ship's blocks and approached Walter Taylor and his son Samuel Silver Taylor with first refusal on the use of his new machinery. The offer was rejected out of hand by Samuel but the Navy decided to install Brunel's machinery in the Royal Dockyard. By 1803, when Brunel's machinery was installed and working the Navy cancelled Taylor's contract.

Taylor died 23 April 1803, and was interred at South Stoneham church on 8 May.
