= Baron Radstock =

Title in the Peerage of Ireland

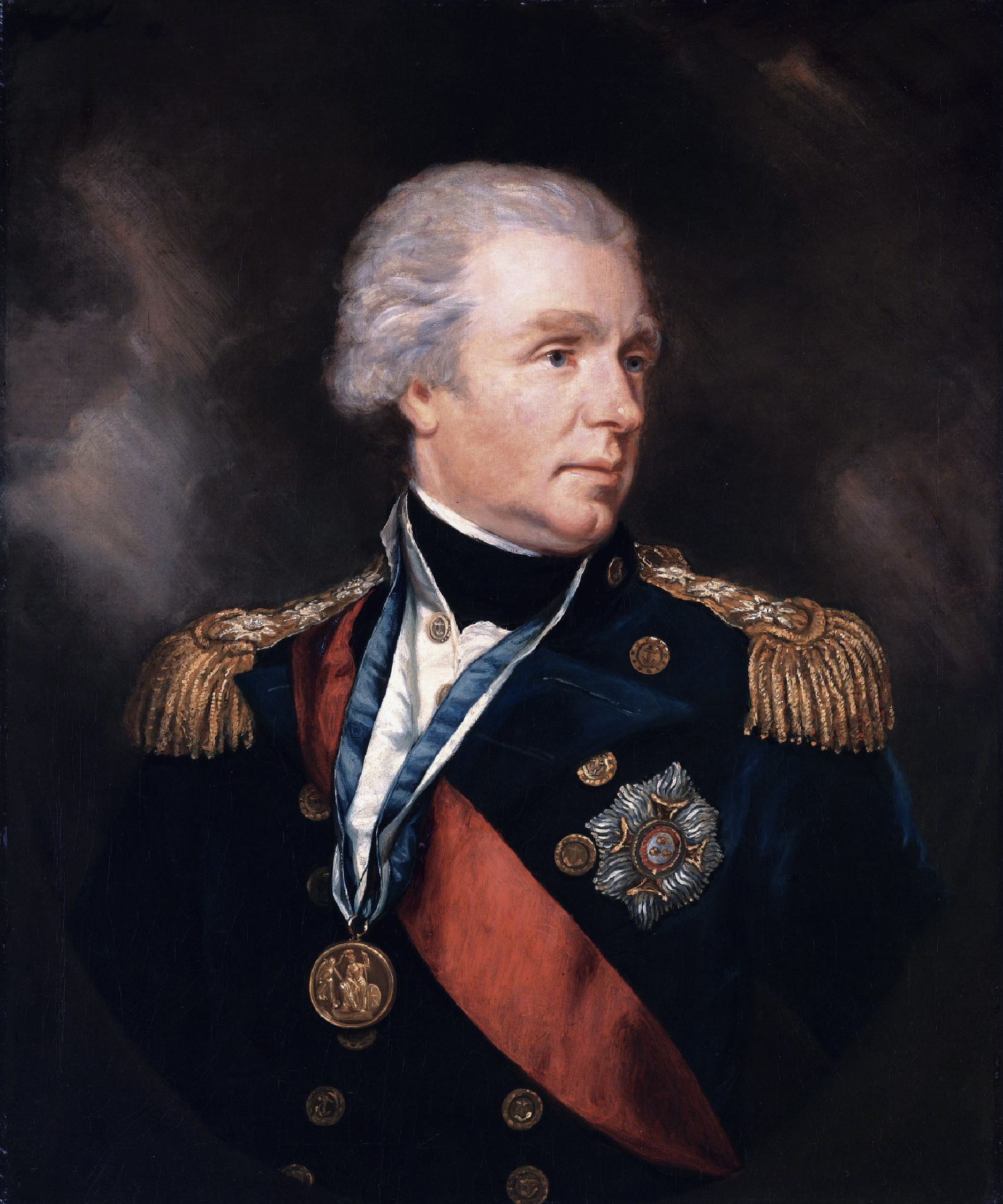
William Waldegrave, 1st Baron Radstock.

Baron Radstock, of Castletown in the Queen's County, was a title in the Peerage of Ireland. It was created in 1800 for Vice-Admiral the Honourable William Waldegrave. He was the second son of John Waldegrave, 3rd Earl Waldegrave (see Earl Waldegrave for earlier history of the family). He was succeeded by his eldest son, the second Baron. He was a Vice-Admiral of the Red. On his death, the title passed to his son, the third Baron. He is best remembered for his work as a missionary in Russia. Two of his sons, the fourth and fifth Barons, both succeeded in the title. The barony became extinct on the latter's death in 1953.

Despite its territorial designation and the fact that it was in the Peerage of Ireland, the title referred to Radstock in Somerset.

== Barons Radstock (1800) ==
- William Waldegrave, 1st Baron Radstock (1753–1825)
- Granville George Waldegrave, 2nd Baron Radstock (1786–1857)
- Granville Augustus William Waldegrave, 3rd Baron Radstock (1833–1913)
- Granville George Waldegrave, 4th Baron Radstock (1859–1937)
- Montague Waldegrave, 5th Baron Radstock (1867–1953)
  - Hon. John Montagu Granville Waldegrave (1905–1944)

== Arms ==
Coat of arms of Baron Radstock
Crest Out of a ducal coronet Or a plum of five ostrich feathers per pale Argent and Gules a crescent Sable for difference. Escutcheon Per pale Argent and Gules a crescent Sable for difference. Supporters Dexter a talbot reguardant wings expanded and elevated holding in the dexter claw a thunderbolt all Proper. Motto St Vincent

== See also ==
- Earl Waldegrave
