= Miller's Pond =

Nature reserve in Southampton, England

Coordinates: 50.896°N 1.360°W

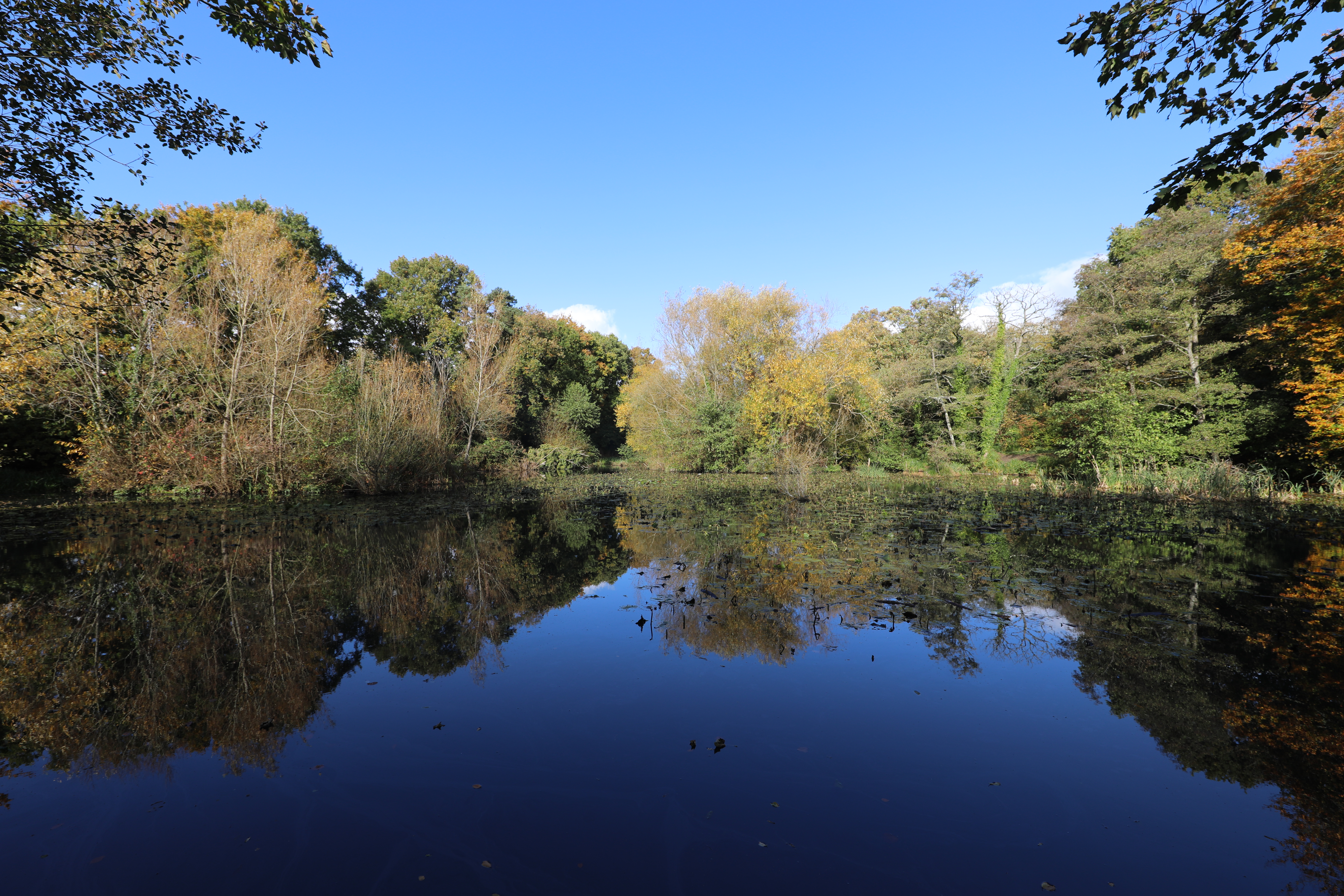
- Interactive map of Miller's Pond
- Type: Local Nature Reserve
- Location: Southampton, Hampshire
- OS grid: SU 451 109
- Area: 8.1 hectares (20 acres)
- Manager: Southampton City Council

Miller's Pond is an 8.1-hectare (20-acre) Local Nature Reserve in Southampton in Hampshire. It is owned by Southampton City Council.

The site is managed by the charity Sholing Valleys Study Centre.

The pond is managed for both angling and wildlife. There are also areas of acid grassland and semi-natural woodland.

The pond is fed by springs and drains to the stream that runs through Mayfield Park.

== History ==
There has been a pond on the site since at least the mid 18th century. Originally it was significantly larger than its current size and in two parts. By the 1960s the pond was starting to silt up. The pond was drained completely in 1966 as part of preparations for large scale commercial and residential development of the area.

In 1978 with the development permanently stalled the Southampton Schools Conservation Corps obtained permission to create a new (smaller) pond on the site of the previous ponds. The work was carried out over the winter of 78/79. In February 2022 Sholing Valleys Study Centre announced a plan for reconstruction work on the pond involving dredging and reinforcing the banks. Shortly afterwards the pond was found to be home to the invasive topmouth gudgeon. These were killed and the pond restocked in January 2024.
