= Ally Law =

English YouTube personality

- Born: Alastair Sherringham Law; 12 February 1997 (age 29); Southampton, Hampshire, England
- Occupation: YouTuber (Retired)
- Children: 1

YouTube information
- Channel: Ally Law
- Years active: 2014–2024
- Genres: urban exploration; urban climbing
- Subscribers: 3.46 million
- Views: 146 million
- Last updated: 4 August, 2026
- Website: www.allylaw.co.uk

Alastair Sherringham Law (born 12 February 1997) is an English YouTuber from Southampton. His videos feature parkour, with him climbing on a range of buildings and cranes, as well as doing "overnight challenges", where he and a group of friends attempt to stay in various commercial premises after closing hours.

== Early life and education ==
Alistair Law was born on 12 February 1997 in Southampton, England. He attended the secondary school Oasis Academy Mayfield, leaving in 2013. Law notes that before starting parkour at the age of 16, he was "extremely unhappy sat in [his] bedroom wasting away day after day, he had quit school and had no friends and had absolutely no idea what [he] wanted to do with [his] life." He had been addicted to video games (mainly RuneScape) since the age of 13. Law is a qualified carpenter. Law also remarked in one of his videos that he played football at the age of seven at The Hamble School in Southampton.

== Career ==
Law started his YouTube channel in December 2014. The first video he uploaded was of him performing parkour on the top of buildings in Southampton city centre, filmed on a GoPro camera. Law started to receive local media attention in the Southern Daily Echo for his stunts in December 2015, after he scaled Dumbleton Towers in the Thornhill area of the city.

He has climbed in multiple locations around the world, such as Melbourne, Dubai, Bangkok, Barcelona and Los Angeles. This includes locations such as La Sagrada Familia and Tour First in Barcelona and Paris respectively.

Law also does "overnight challenges", where he and a group of friends will attempt to stay in a range of commercial premises after closing hours.

After trespassing in Thorpe Park to climb the Stealth roller coaster in July 2017, and breaking into the Celebrity Big Brother house twice in January 2018, Law was given a five-year criminal behaviour order that prevents him from trespassing on areas of bridges or buildings not open to the public, or any business property outside business hours. He also received a lifetime ban from all properties owned by Merlin Entertainments. The criminal behaviour order only applies in England, Wales and Northern Ireland, and a breach of the conditions could lead to a possible five-year jail sentence. In addition, Law was sentenced to 120 hours of community work for breaking into the set of Celebrity Big Brother. In 2019, Law took part in an MMA match, losing by majority decision to Joseph Henderson.

His YouTube channel description stated "Retired" in 2025 with all his videos being privated. As of February 2026, some of his videos have been set back to public.

=== Criticism ===
Law has received criticism from politicians, police and general members of the public for his climbing and trespassing at various properties. He was warned multiple times by Hampshire Constabulary for trespassing, and after the video footage of him climbing Dumbleton Towers appeared in the Daily Echo, Southampton City Council leader Simon Letts stated that "It is a tragedy waiting to happen and someone's mother is not going to have a son at Christmas." In response to the trespassing, Law says "I always make sure I find them and explain to them what I am doing and in most cases the police are really understanding."

Speaking to 9news.com.au after climbing a crane in Melbourne, Law stated that "[he] is not going to pretend it's not dangerous [...] I will never put myself in a situation I'm not 110 percent confident with."

When Law and a group of friends trespassed into the Etihad Stadium in Manchester in September 2017, The Independent called the incident a "concerning security breach".

== MMA record ==
Res.	Record	Opponent	Method	Event	Date	Round	Time	Location	Notes
Lost	1-0	Joseph Henderson	Decision (majority)	FAME MMA UK	14 December 2019	3	3:00	Newcastle-upon-Tyne, England	
