= Granville Waldegrave, 3rd Baron Radstock =

The Lord Radstock
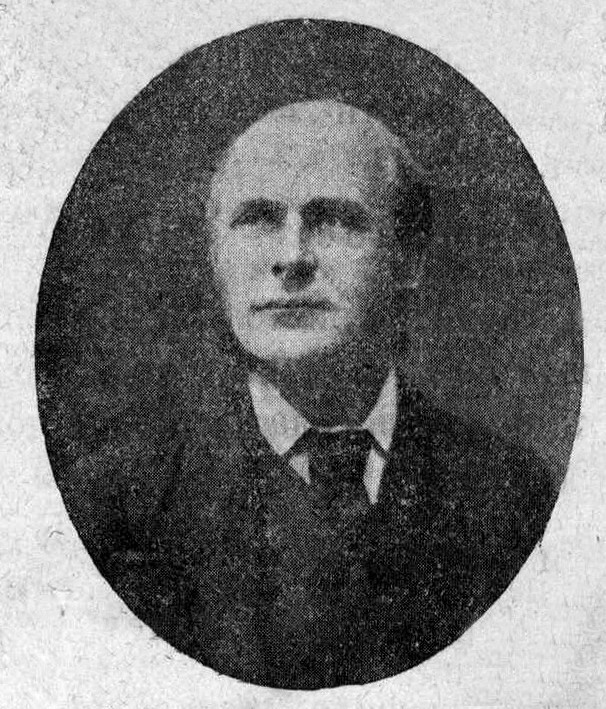
- Born: 10 April 1833; London, England
- Died: 8 December 1913 (aged 80); Hôtel d'Jéna, Paris, France
- Occupation: Missionary

Granville Augustus William Waldegrave, 3rd Baron Radstock (10 April 1833 – 8 December 1913) was a British missionary and a baron in the Peerage of Ireland.

== Biography ==
Waldegrave was born in 1833, the only son of Granville Waldegrave, 2nd Baron Radstock and his wife Esther Caroline Paget. He became the 3rd Baron Radstock on the death of his father in 1857. On 25 April 1860, he was commissioned as Lieutenant-Colonel Commandant of the 9th (Marylebone and West Middlesex) Middlesex Rifle Volunteer Corps. He resigned his commission at the end of October 1866.

As a result of a spiritual crisis during the Crimean War, Radstock with his wife joined the Plymouth brothers' "free" church in Bristol. It was a community of the so-called Open Brethren, led by prominent theologian and missionary George Müller.

Radstock was a missionary during the "Great Russian Awakening", preaching and evangelising among members of the Russian aristocracy. In 1874, he travelled to St Petersburg as part of his missionary work, repeating the trips in 1875–76, and in 1878. During this period, Radstock's activities attracted the attention of the writer Leo Tolstoy, who based the character Sir John on Radstock in his novel Anna Karenina. Radstock's missionary efforts met with much success before he was expelled from Russia in 1878.

In September 1879 Radstock visited Helsinki, Grand Duchy of Finland, and united and provided an impetus for the early free church movement in Finland.

Radstock later visited Sweden and Denmark, preaching at evangelistic services. He continued to maintain correspondence for many years with Sophia of Nassau, Queen of Sweden and Norway, and Louise, later Queen of Denmark.

== Marriage and children ==
Radstock married Susan Charlotte Calcraft (1833–1892) on 16 July 1858 in Holy Trinity Church, Marylebone, London. She was the youngest daughter of John Hales Calcraft, MP for Wareham, and Lady Caroline Montagu, daughter of William Montagu, 5th Duke of Manchester. In 1889, they acquired the Mayfield estate in Weston, Southampton.

Lord and Lady Radstock had nine children:

- Granville George Waldegrave, 4th Baron Radstock (born 1 September 1859, died 2 April 1937)
- Hon Katherine Waldegrave (born 1860, died 4 December 1874)
- Hon Edith Caroline Waldegrave (born 1862, died 15 November 1925)
- Hon Mabel Waldegrave (born 1863, died 12 December 1929)
- Hon Constance Waldegrave (born 1865, died 19 June 1945)
- An unnamed son (born and died 1866)
- Montague Waldegrave, 5th Baron Radstock (born 15 July 1867, died 17 September 1953)
- Hon John Waldegrave (born 30 December 1868, died 4 April 1901)
- Hon Mary Waldegrave (born 1870)

== Death ==
Lord Radstock died in Paris on 8 December 1913 and was succeeded in the peerage by his eldest son, Granville.

== Arms ==
Coat of arms of Granville Waldegrave, 3rd Baron Radstock
Crest Out of a ducal coronet Or a plum of five ostrich feathers per pale Argent and Gules a crescent Sable for difference. Escutcheon Per pale Argent and Gules a crescent Sable for difference. Supporters Dexter a talbot reguardant wings expanded and elevated holding in the dexter claw a thunderbolt all Proper. Motto St Vincent

== Sources ==
- Fountain, David G. (1988). Lord Radstock and the Russian Awakening. Southampton: Mayflower Christian Books. ISBN 978-0-907821-04-5.

Peerage of Ireland
Preceded by Granville Waldegrave	Baron Radstock; 1857–1913	Succeeded by Granville Waldegrave
