= Centenary Quay =

Mixed-use development in Southampton, England

Coordinates: 50.89448°N 1.38228°W

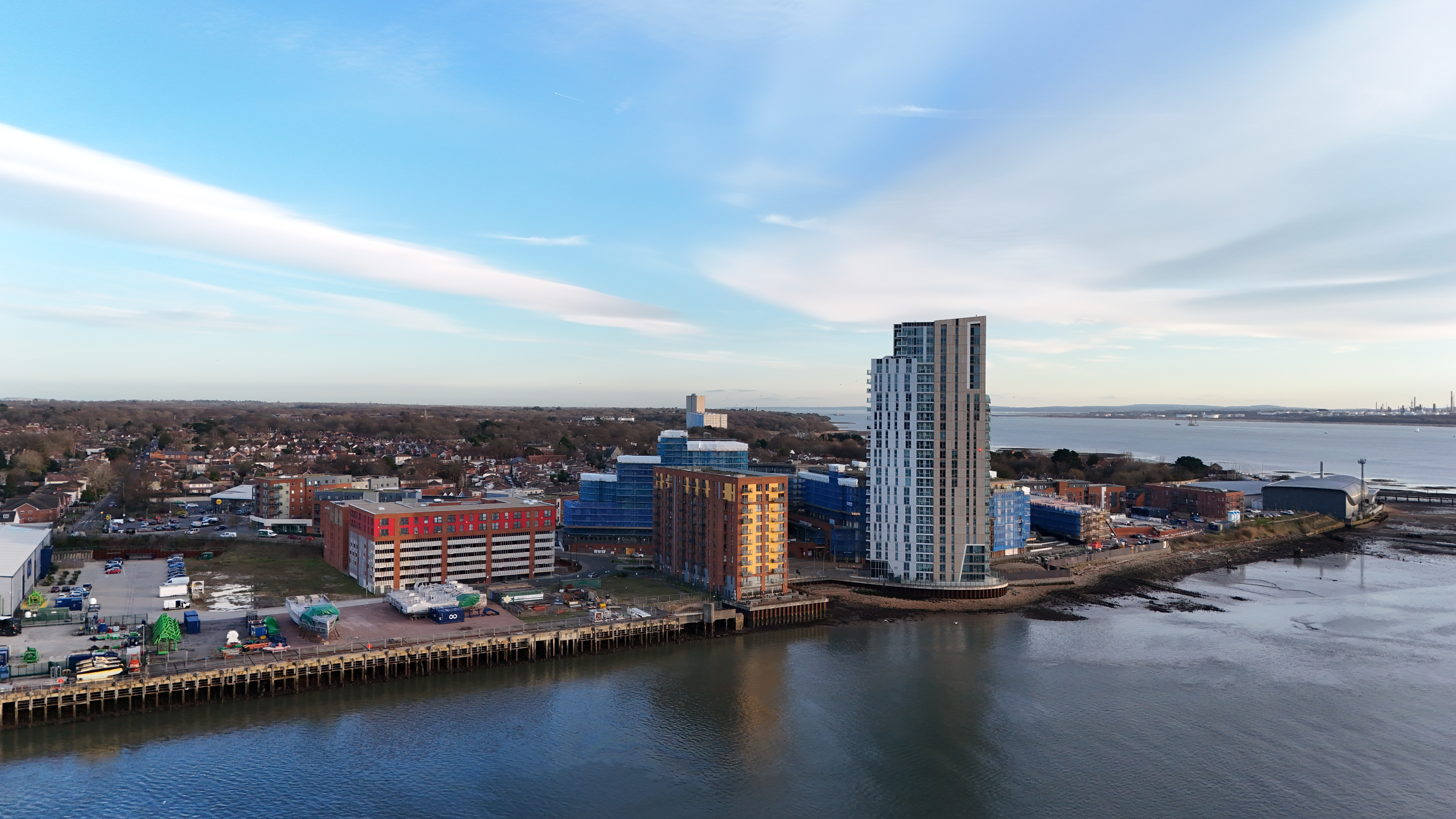
Centenary Quay in 2025

Centenary Quay is a mixed-use residential, business and leisure development on the mouth of the River Itchen in Woolston, Southampton on the south coast of England. Originally the site of Vosper Thorneycroft shipbuilders, the site has been the focus of regeneration since 2008. The site is 31 acres, with a central plaza called Woolston Riverside.

== History ==
By 2003, the Vosper Thorneycroft no longer had enough space at the site, and it was decided to move production to a new yard at Portchester, Hampshire.

The city council then pushed for redevelopment of the site, much like what had occurred across the river at Ocean Village.

The initial plans were submitted in May 2008 for a mixed residential and commercial development of the quay. There were also plans for a yacht building firm to move in and create 700 new jobs along with a 46,500 sq ft (4,320 m^{2}) supermarket. The plans included houses of different types, Crest Nicholson were offering 2-, 3- or 4-bedroom houses as well as building three large skyscrapers which containing hundreds of flats, a hotel and restaurants. The plans were agreed in August of that year.

By late 2008, work began to clear the site of harmful materials and any other pollutants such as hydrocarbons, asbestos and harmful metals left over from the demolition of the dated Vosper Thornycroft warehouses and workshops. BAM Nuttall were contracted to complete this part of the work, and it soon became apparent that it would turn into a more complex operation than previously thought. Therefore, this delayed progress.

In July 2010, a foundation laying ceremony was held to commence the beginning of building work. Local councillors attended and the foundation stone was laid by the Secretary of State for Communities and Local Government, Eric Pickles.

In 2011, the first set of homes were completed and sold.

In 2013, Morrisons announced its intention to use one of the retail units for a 60,000 square feet shop. However, this fell through in 2016 upon the city council allowing for an old co-op site to be converted into a Lidl, directly opposite the planned Morrisons.

In 2016, the new public library opened. This replaced the former Woolston Library.

In 2019, construction on the main tower started. The tower is 85m tall (278ft), which equates to 27 storeys. Upon topping out in 2022, it became Southampton's tallest building.

== Amenities ==
Currently, there is a range of amenities. This includes a bar, beauty salon, gym, library and dentist.

== Gallery ==
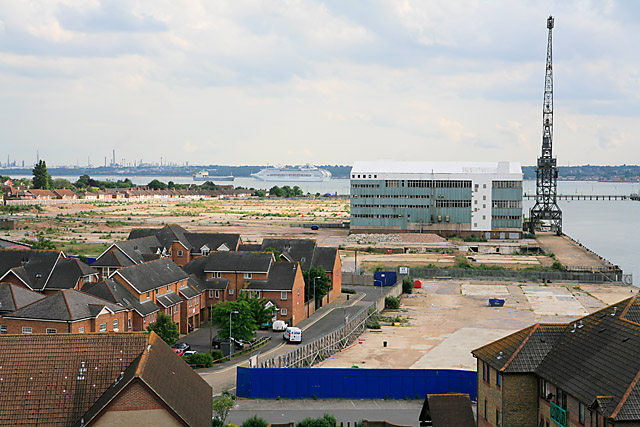
The site, May 2007 before demolition of the final smaller shed and crane.

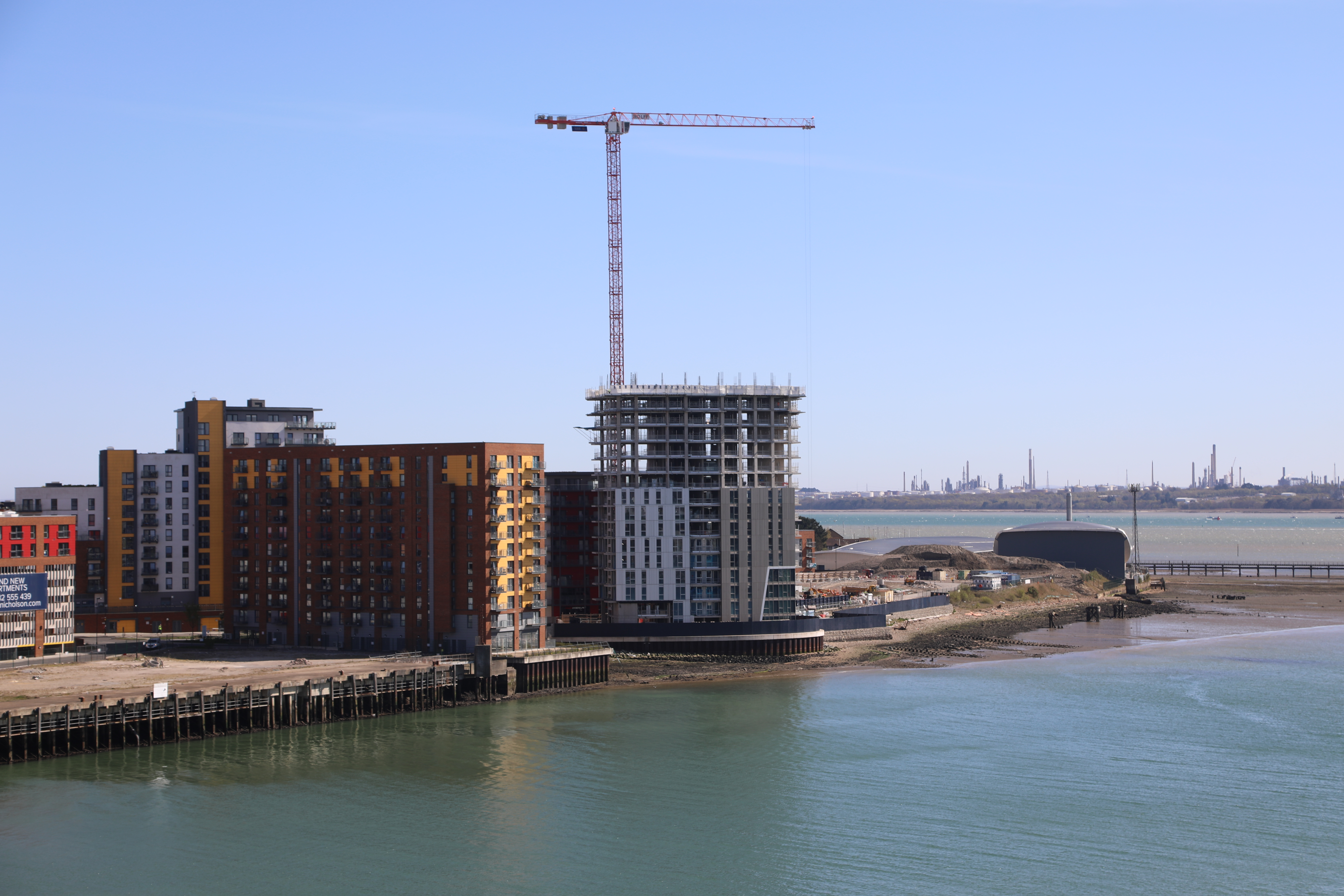
Construction in 2011.

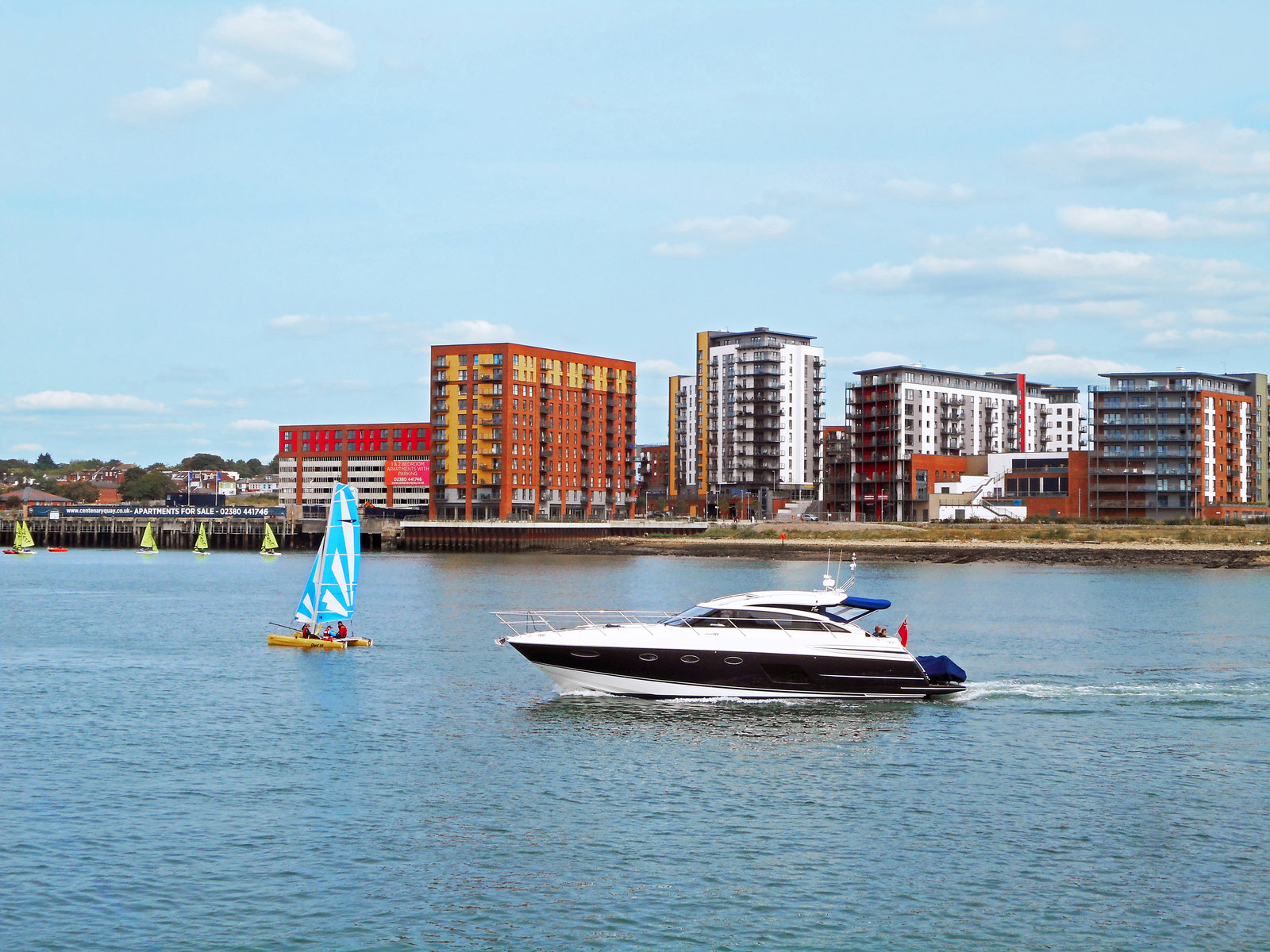
Centenary Quay from across the river Itchen.
