= William Waldegrave, 1st Baron Radstock =

Royal Navy officer and colonial administrator (1753–1825)

Admiral The Right Honourable The Lord Radstock GCB
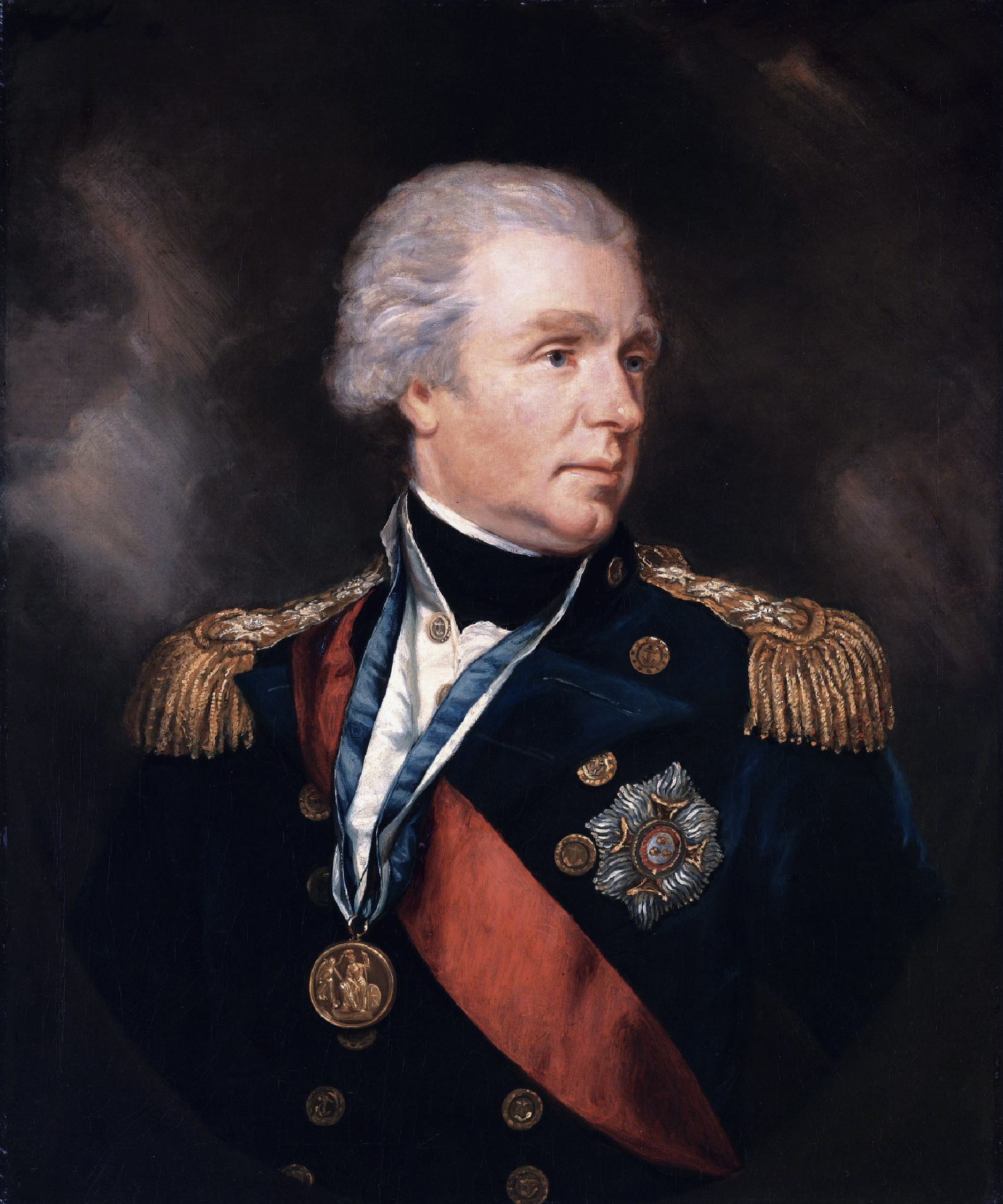
- Portrait by James Northcote
- Born: 9 July 1753
- Died: 20 August 1825 (aged 72); London, England
- Spouse: Cornelia Jacoba van Lennep
- Children: 9, including Granville
- Military career
- Allegiance: Great Britain; United Kingdom
- Branch: Royal Navy
- Service years: 1766–1802
- Rank: Admiral of the Red
- Commands: HMS Zephyr
- Awards: Knight Grand Cross of the Order of the Bath

Viceregal styles of The Lord Radstock
- Reference style: His Excellency
- Spoken style: Your Excellency

Admiral of the Red William Waldegrave, 1st Baron Radstock, GCB (9 July 1753 – 20 August 1825) was a Royal Navy officer and colonial administrator who served as the governor of Newfoundland.

== Early life and education ==
Waldegrave was the second son of John Waldegrave, 3rd Earl Waldegrave, and Elizabeth (née Gower). He was educated at Eton.

== Naval career ==
Waldegrave joined the Royal Navy in 1766, initially in HMS Jersey, the flagship of the Mediterranean fleet. He was promoted to lieutenant and later commander in 1775 when he received command of the sloop HMS Zephyr. He was further promoted to captain in 1776 when he sailed to India in HMS Rippon, flagship of Admiral Edward Vernon. After 15 months poor health forced him home but from 1778 to the end of the War of American Independence in 1783 he was a frigate captain. He spent the next ten years travelling and beginning a family.

At the start of the French Revolutionary War Waldegrave commanded HMS Courageux under Samuel Hood, 1st Viscount Hood at Toulon and later HMS Barfleur under John Jervis, 1st Earl of St Vincent in the Mediterranean where he was third in command at the Battle of Cape St Vincent in 1797. Waldegrave was offered a baronetcy for the role he played in the battle, but declined the offer on the grounds that, as a son of an earl, he already held a higher station.

Waldegrave was promoted to rear admiral in 1794 and to vice-admiral in 1795.

== Governor of Newfoundland ==
Waldegrave was appointed the Governor of Newfoundland, Saint-Pierre and Miquelon on 16 May 1797.

During Waldegrave's time as governor, he was chiefly concerned with military matters, as a French squadron had burned Bay Bulls just a year prior, and Newfoundland was still quite exposed. Another key problem was desertion, as soldiers deserting to Newfoundland were generally sheltered by the island's inhabitants. A naval mutiny occurred shortly after Waldegrave's appointment and had to be stopped; Waldegrave also took steps to ensure that soldiers garrisoned in St John's did not try anything similar. In military matters, he was often at odds with his commander, Lieutenant Colonel Thomas Skinner.

Waldegrave made several attempts to restrict the power of the merchants on Newfoundland, and also to bring law and order to the island. Although his efforts against the merchants were largely ineffective, Waldegrave was successful in having a chief justice appointed who would reside year-round. Waldegrave also undertook various humanitarian projects, especially to help the poor. He established a "Committee for the Relief of the Poor", and contributed generously to the fund. Between 1797 and 1798, nearly 300 people received assistance from this fund.

Waldegrave completed his term as governor in 1800.

== Honours ==
Waldegrave was created a peer as Baron Radstock, of Castletown in the Queen's County in the Peerage of Ireland in 1800 on the completion of his term as Governor of Newfoundland. In 1802, upon his retirement from the Navy, Waldegrave was promoted to full admiral. In 1815 he was appointed a Knight Grand Cross of the Order of the Bath (GCB).

== Marriage and children ==
Waldegrave was married in 1785 to Cornelia Jacoba van Lennep (17 September 1753 – 10 October 1839). They had three sons and six daughters:

- Vice-admiral Granville George Waldegrave, 2nd Baron Radstock (1786–1857), married Esther Paget and had issue
- Hon Emily Susanna Laura Waldegrave (5 November 1787 – 12 April 1870), married Nicholas Westby of Thornhill, Mount Merrion, County Dublin, and had issue
- Maria Waldegrave (26 December 1788 – 1791)
- Hon Isabella Elizabeth Waldegrave (18 August 1792 – 21 October 1866)
- Hon Harriet Ann Frances Waldegrave (20 October 1793 – 26 July 1880), unmarried
- Captain Hon William Waldegrave (7 June 1796 – 29 December 1838), married Amelia Allport
- Hon Caroline Waldegrave (4 October 1798 – 7 January 1878), married Rev. Carew Anthony St John-Mildmay and had issue
- Hon Augustus Waldegrave (4 February 1803 – November 1825), killed in a hunting accident near Mexico City
- Elizabeth Frances Waldegrave (24 November 1799 – August 1800)

== Arms ==
Coat of arms of William Waldegrave, 1st Baron Radstock
| Crest Out of a ducal coronet Or a plum of five ostrich feathers per pale Argent and Gules a crescent Sable for difference. Escutcheon Per pale Argent and Gules a crescent Sable for difference. Supporters Dexter a talbot reguardant wings expanded and elevated holding in the dexter claw a thunderbolt all Proper. Motto St Vincent |

== See also ==
- Governors of Newfoundland
- List of people from Newfoundland and Labrador
- Waldegrave Islands
- Cape Radstock

Political offices
| Preceded by Sir James Wallace | Commodore Governor of Newfoundland; 1797–1800 | Succeeded by Sir Charles Morice Pole |
Peerage of Ireland
| New creation | Baron Radstock; 1800–1825 | Succeeded by Granville Waldegrave |
