= Montague Waldegrave, 5th Baron Radstock =

Irish noble (1867–1953)

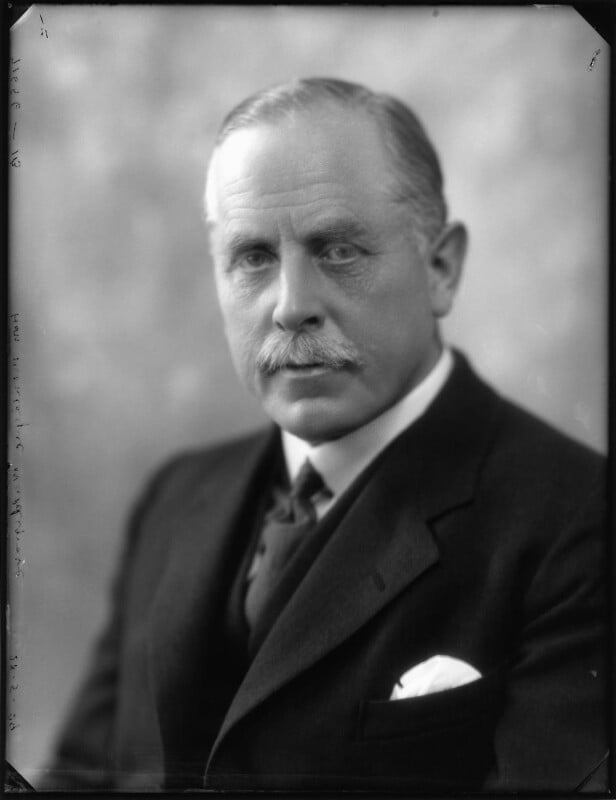
Waldegrave in 1929

Montague Waldegrave, 5th Baron Radstock (15 July 1867 – 17 September 1953) was the second son of Granville Waldegrave, 3rd Baron Radstock and his wife, Susan Charlotte Calcroft.

== Life ==
Radstock was educated at Monkton Combe School and Trinity College, Cambridge, graduating with a BA degree in 1889. He served as executive of The Native Races and the Liquor Traffic Commission, a temperance pressure organisation, from 1925 to 1931.

When his elder brother the 4th baron died without issue in 1937, he succeeded to the title of Baron Radstock of Castle Town, Queen's County, Ireland.

== Marriage and children ==
Radstock married Constance Marion Brodie on 15 July 1898. They had three daughters and a son:

- Rachel Elizabeth Waldegrave (born 12 May 1899, died 6 January 1900)
- Hon Esther Constance Waldegrave (born 11 November 1900, died 17 April 1957)
- Hon Elizabeth Alexandra Sophia Waldegrave (born 22 September 1902)
- Commander Hon John Montagu Granville Waldegrave DSC RN (born 29 August 1905, killed in action 18 February 1944)

Radstock's only son, John, was killed in action in 1944 whilst on active service aboard HMS Penelope, leaving behind two daughters. With no remaining male heirs, the barony became extinct on the death of the 5th baron at the age of 86 in 1953.

== Arms ==
Coat of arms of Montague Waldegrave, 5th Baron Radstock
Crest Out of a ducal coronet Or a plum of five ostrich feathers per pale Argent and Gules a crescent Sable for difference. Escutcheon Per pale Argent and Gules a crescent Sable for difference. Supporters Dexter a talbot reguardant wings expanded and elevated holding in the dexter claw a thunderbolt all Proper. Motto St Vincent

Peerage of Ireland
Preceded by Granville Waldegrave	Baron Radstock; 1937–1953	Extinct
