= Weston, Southampton =

Suburb of Southampton, England

Coordinates: 50.8861°N 1.3699°W

Weston
- Location within Southampton
- Unitary authority: Southampton
- Ceremonial county: Hampshire
- Region: South East
- Country: England
- Sovereign state: United Kingdom
- Post town: SOUTHAMPTON
- Postcode district: SO19
- Dialling code: 023
- Police: Hampshire and Isle of Wight
- Fire: Hampshire and Isle of Wight
- Ambulance: South Central
- UK Parliament: Southampton Itchen

Weston is a small suburb on the south-eastern side of Southampton, UK, predominantly built on the Weston Grove Estate formerly owned by the Chamberlayne family. It also includes the area that was previously the Barnfield Estate. Weston includes part of Mayfield Park, which was previously the Mayfield Estate. Weston is bounded by Woolston, Sholing, Netley and Southampton Water.

== Origins ==
Weston was originally a small fishing community. The earliest references date to the end of the 10th century.

John de Weston is recorded as a Burgess of Southampton in 1332. In the 17th and 18th centuries, there are occasional records of disputes over fishing rights

The Seaweed Hut that used to stand on Weston Shore appears on 17th century maps. It was used to store the fishermen's equipment.

== The Chamberlayne family ==
In 1424, Ralph Chamberlayne's wife Alice inherited an estate on the east bank of the River Itchen. What that estate contained, how it subsequently changed hands and was split-up is not clear, but at least part of it remained connected with the Chamberlayne family as in 1781, William Chamberlayne inherited what was then the Weston Park Estate from Thomas Dummer.

His son, William Chamberlayne, later to become MP for Southampton, inherited the estate on the death of his father in 1799. In 1802, William Chamberlayne built Weston Grove House, forming the Weston Grove estate.

The Weston Grove estate was subsequently inherited by Thomas Chamberlayne in 1831. Part of the Estate was sold to Col. Robert Wright in 1854, to create the Mayfield estate. The Barnfield estate was situated between Weston Grove House and the Mayfield estate and is shown on the 1864 Ordnance Survey map (NC/03/17984)

Denzil Chamberlayne, eldest son of Thomas Chamberlayne, took part in the Charge of the Light Brigade. He died in 1873.

In 1876, Tankerville Chamberlayne inherited the estate. He too was to become MP for Southampton. He died in 1924 leaving a daughter, Penelope Mary Alexandra Chamberlayne, who married Major Nigel Donald Peter Macdonald (son of Sir Godfrey Middleton Bosville Macdonald of the Isles (15th Baronet)), changing their surname to "Chamberlayne-Macdonald".

== World War I ==
A number of the larger houses in Southampton were used to treat wounded soldiers during World War I. Barnfield House and Mayfield House were definitely among them, convenient due to their proximity to the Royal Victoria Military Hospital at Netley. Whether Weston Grove House was also used for this purpose is not yet confirmed.

The Royal Navy also had a large site between Archery Road and the waterfront, on land that was originally part of the Weston Grove estate. Built in 1917, this building was half a mile long and was originally used as a rolling mill, to produce brass strip that was used to make small calibre shell cases. The depot was subsequently used as Royal Navy stores, finally closing in 1987.

== Development ==
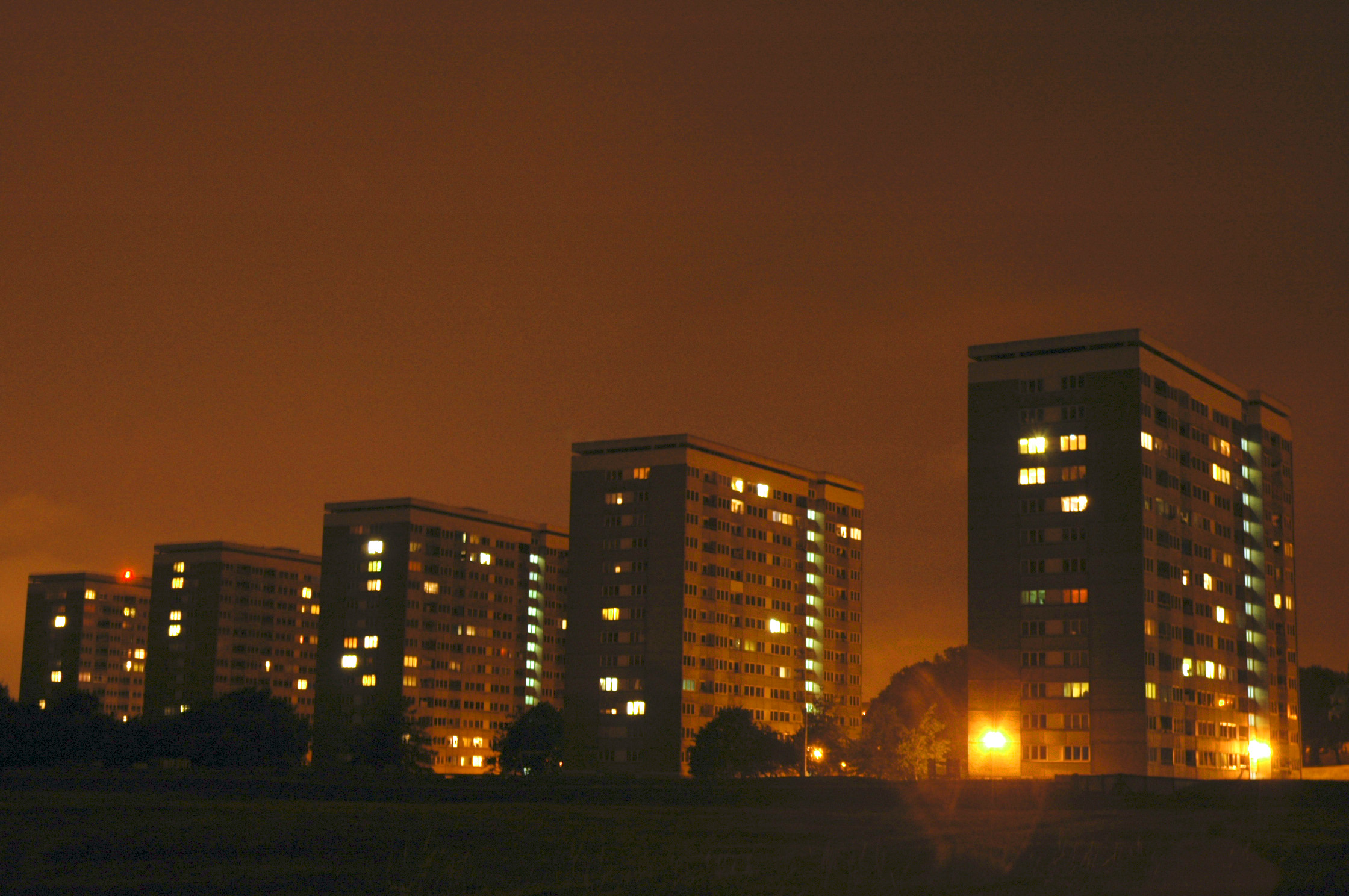
Weston Tower Blocks

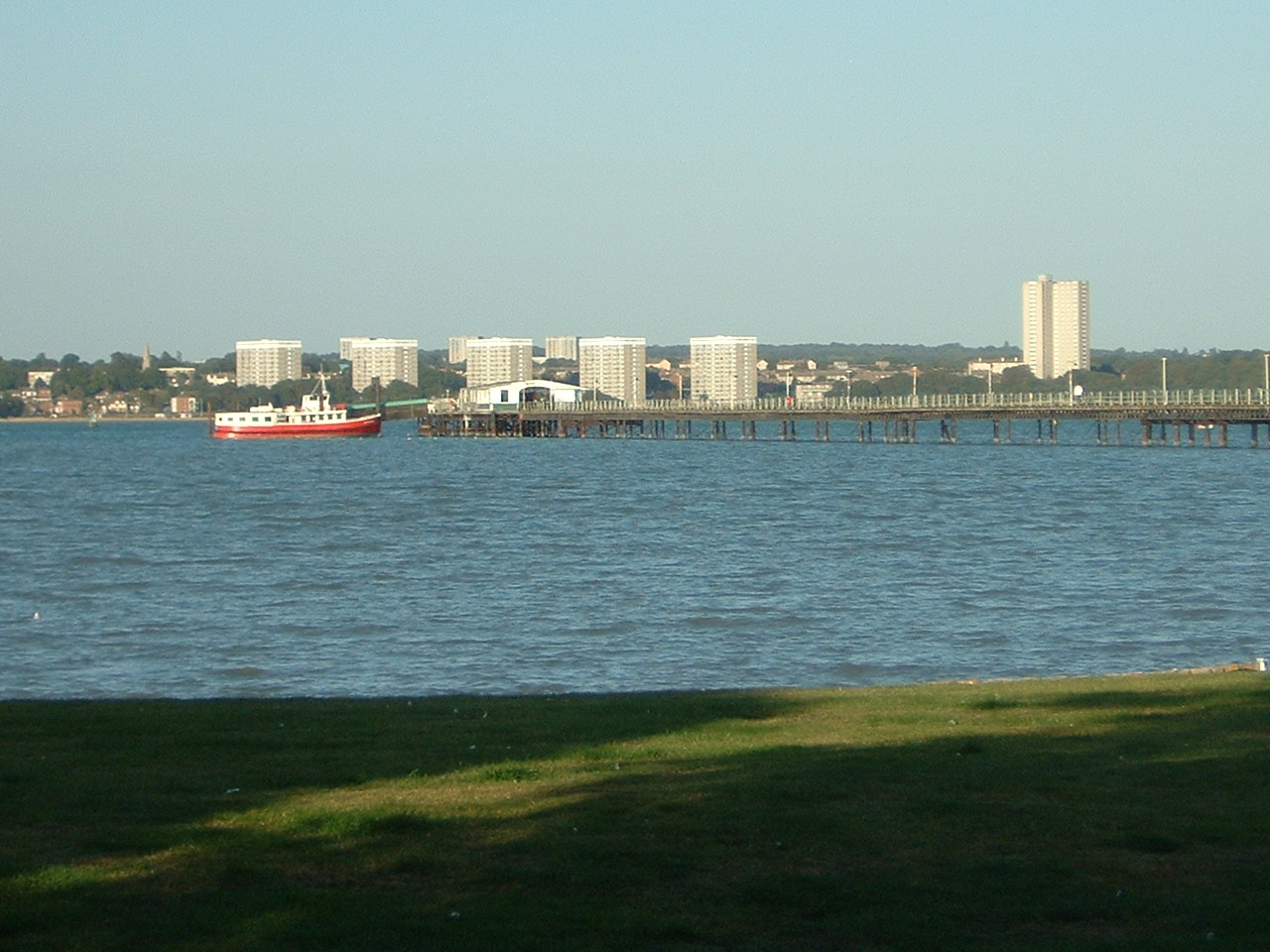
Weston Tower Blocks viewed from Hythe. The Spire of Holy Trinity Church is also visible

Weston did not become part of Southampton until 1920, when it started to become more urbanised. A consequence was that Weston Lane was widened to cater for the motor car, demolishing two impressive stone arches built by William Chamberlayne (MP) that allowed him to cross between different parts of his Weston Grove estate unhindered by the Weston Lane. The arch at the upper end of Weston Lane was demolished in the early sixties and the arch at the lower end was demolished in 1948.

In 1909, an act of Parliament required that 189 acres (0.76 km^{2}) of land be sold to London and South Western Railway, by Tankerville Chamberlayne, for the purpose of building an enormous dry dock some 1,600 ft long (490 m). Although the land was acquired, the project didn't proceed. The site was subsequently sold to the Ministry of Munitions and the Rolling Mills were built instead. Situated directly below Weston Grove House, the Rolling Mills building obstructed the view of Southampton Water from Weston Grove House. The house was demolished in 1940. The site was subsequently used to build the Telephone Engineering Centre, in Archery Road.

Although there is some pre-war housing in Weston Lane, near Holy Trinity Church, the bulk of Weston was built to meet the post-war demand for new housing in Southampton.

Many of the first new homes in this area were prefabs. Some of those supposedly temporary buildings still exist, suitably modernised.

Modern Weston mainly consists of housing estates and Tower blocks. It suffers some of the problems that are associated with this type of housing, but Hampton Towers, Havre Towers, Oslo Towers, Copenhagen Towers, Rotterdam Towers and Canberra Towers are a very distinctive landmark when approaching the port of Southampton by sea.

== Weston Shore ==
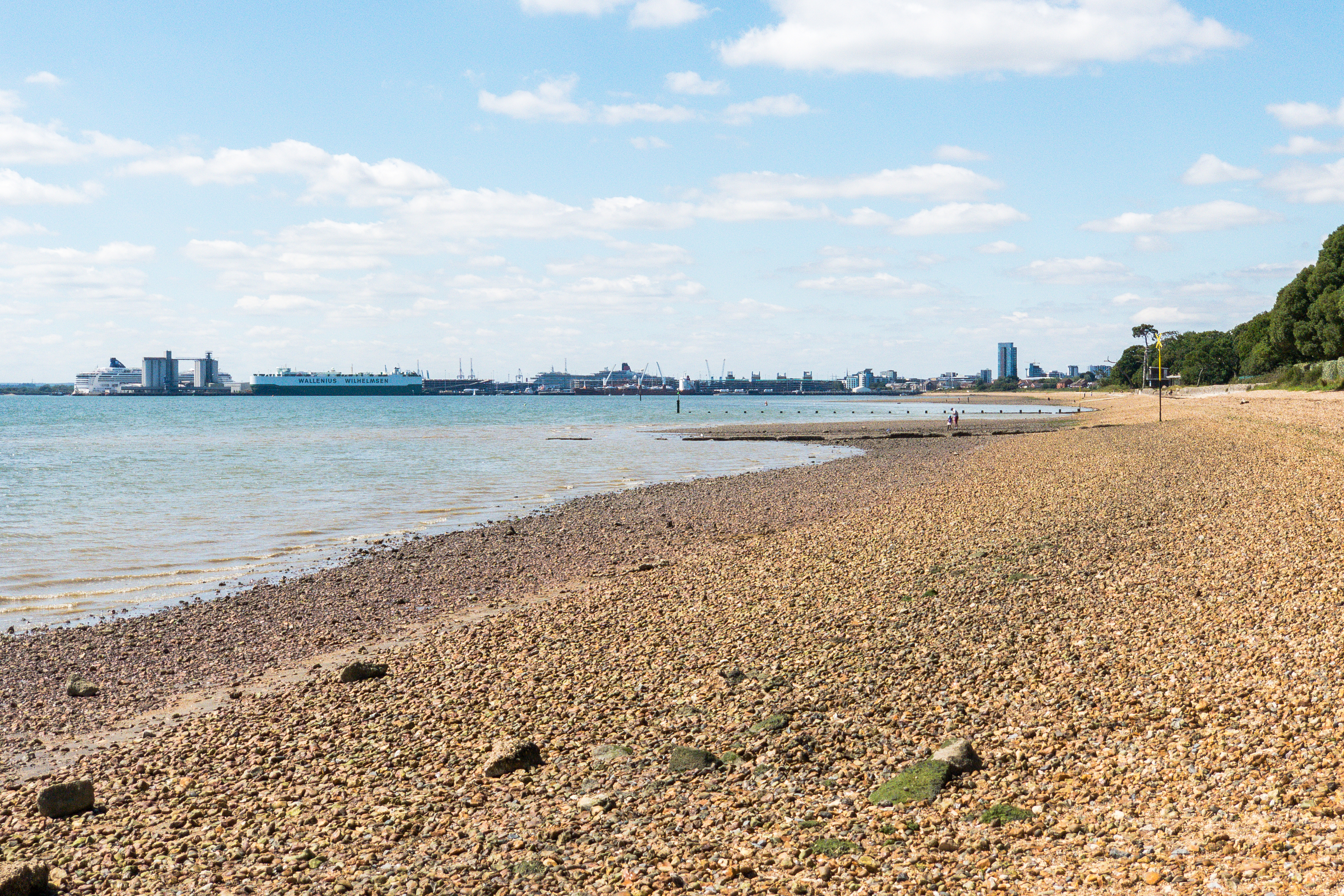
Weston Shore

Weston borders Southampton Water at a shingle beach where some 1930s beach shelters can still be seen. These have been repainted white. This is Southampton's only remaining shoreline and provides a vantage point to observe Southampton's double high-tide.

Weston Shore draws large crowds for every cruise liner that makes its first or final trip along Southampton Water to the port of Southampton. It has also attracted large crowds to witness air displays over Southampton water.

This stretch of shoreline was closed to the public and packed with troops, equipment and landing craft in the build-up to D-day and in the subsequent re-supply operations.

A community group called the Friends of Weston Shore carries out litter picks on the shore with help from members of the public.

Weston Sailing Club is on Weston Shore, at Abbey Hill in Netley. The club was founded in 1952 and originally located by the Rolling Mills. In 1954 the Council planned to redevelop the shore, and the club was therefore moved to near the Old Seaweed Hut. After some delay because of council planning issues and funding, the club was granted land at Abbey Hill in 1968, and built a clubhouse there.

== Schools ==
The main secondary school serving Weston is Weston Secondary School. The neighbouring school of Weston Park Junior School and Weston Park Infant School share a site and have become Weston Park Primary School. Weston Shore Infant School the only other school in the area.

== Weston in the media ==
The tower blocks featured in the 2015 British Sci-Fi thriller film Containment.

== Gallery ==
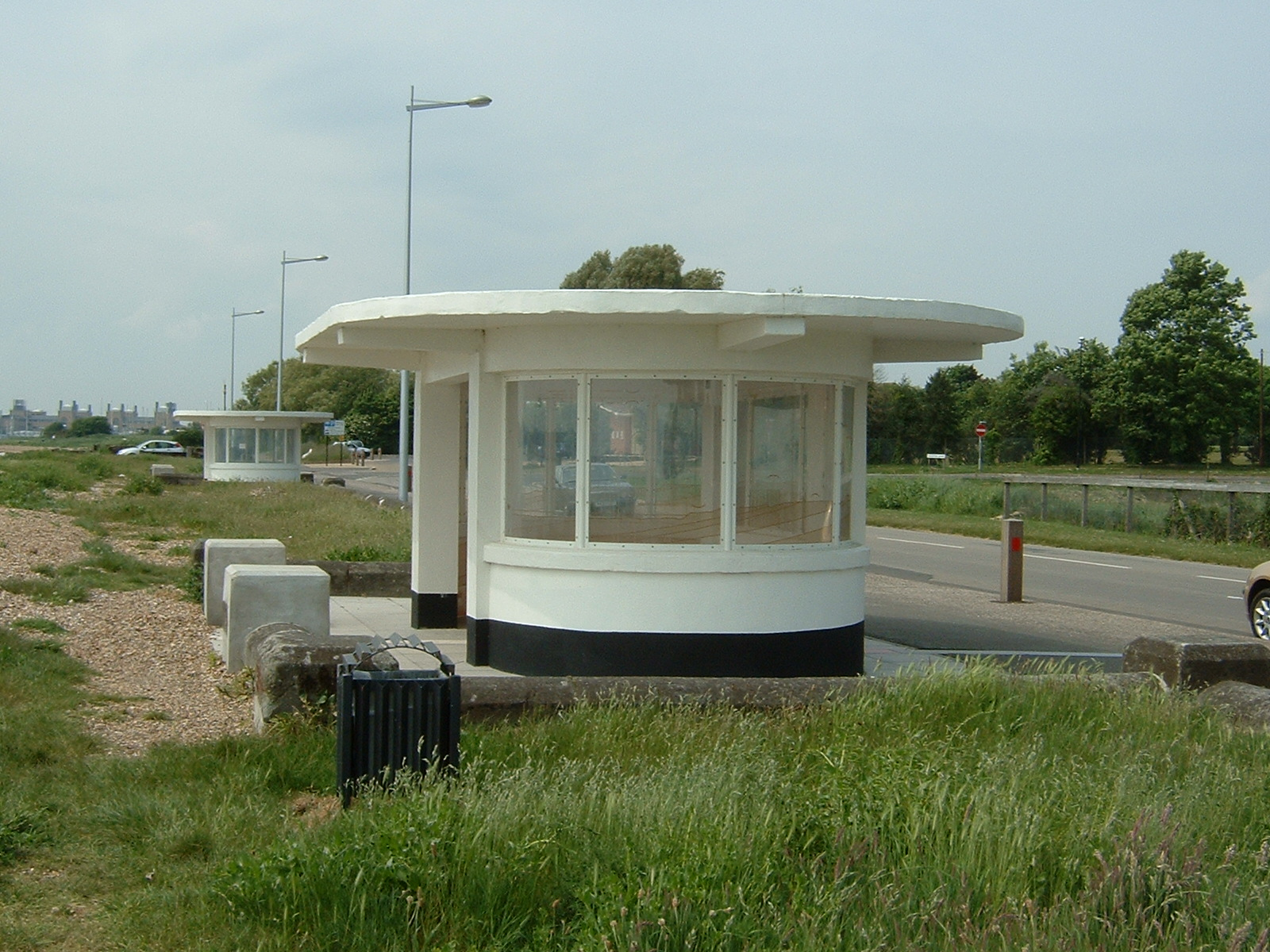

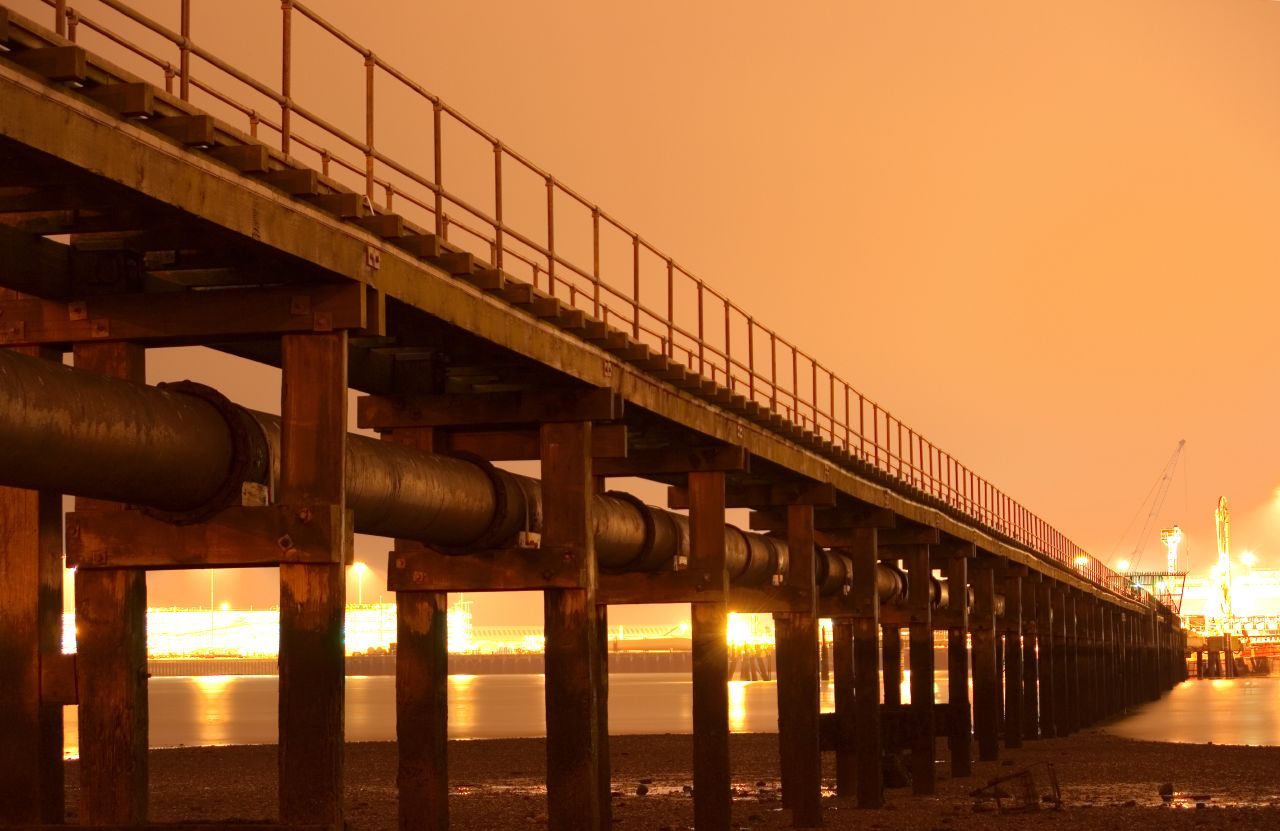

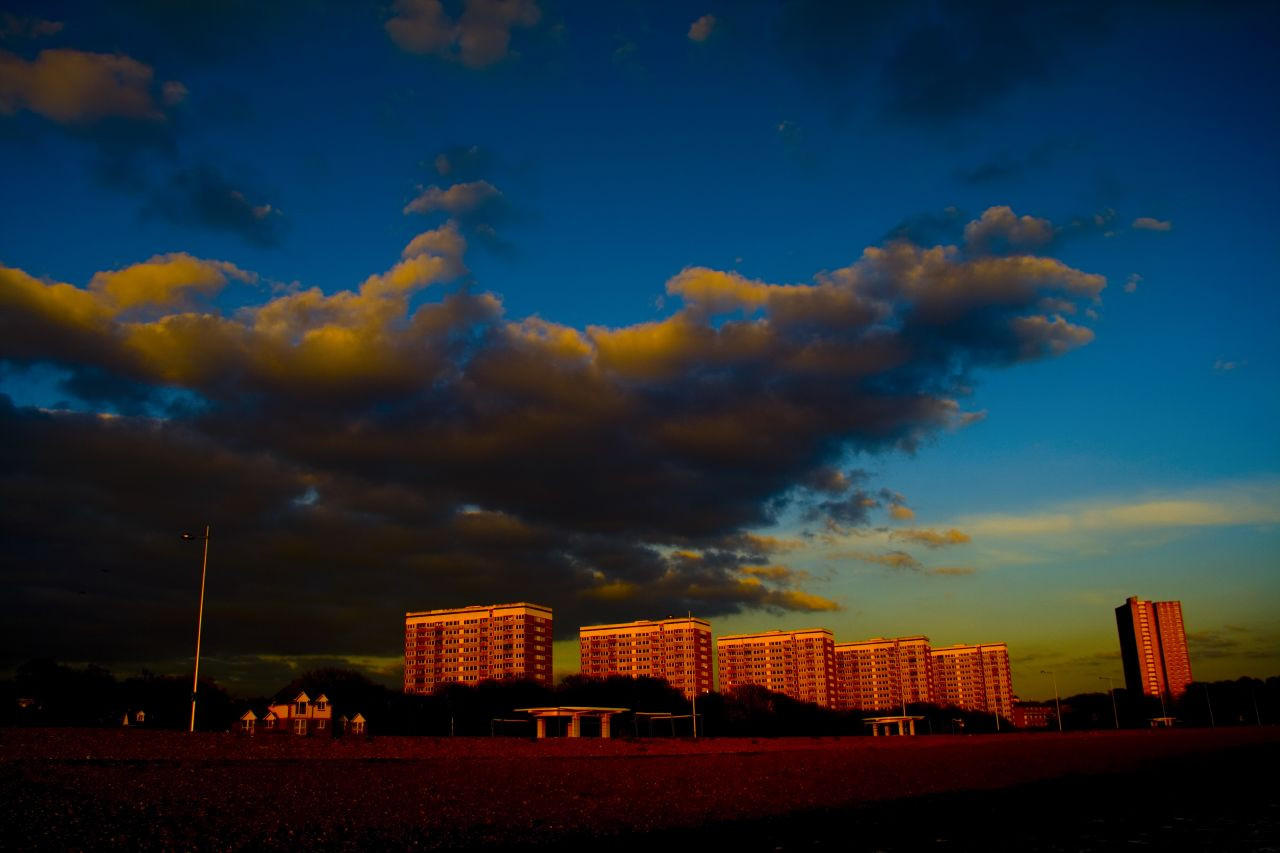

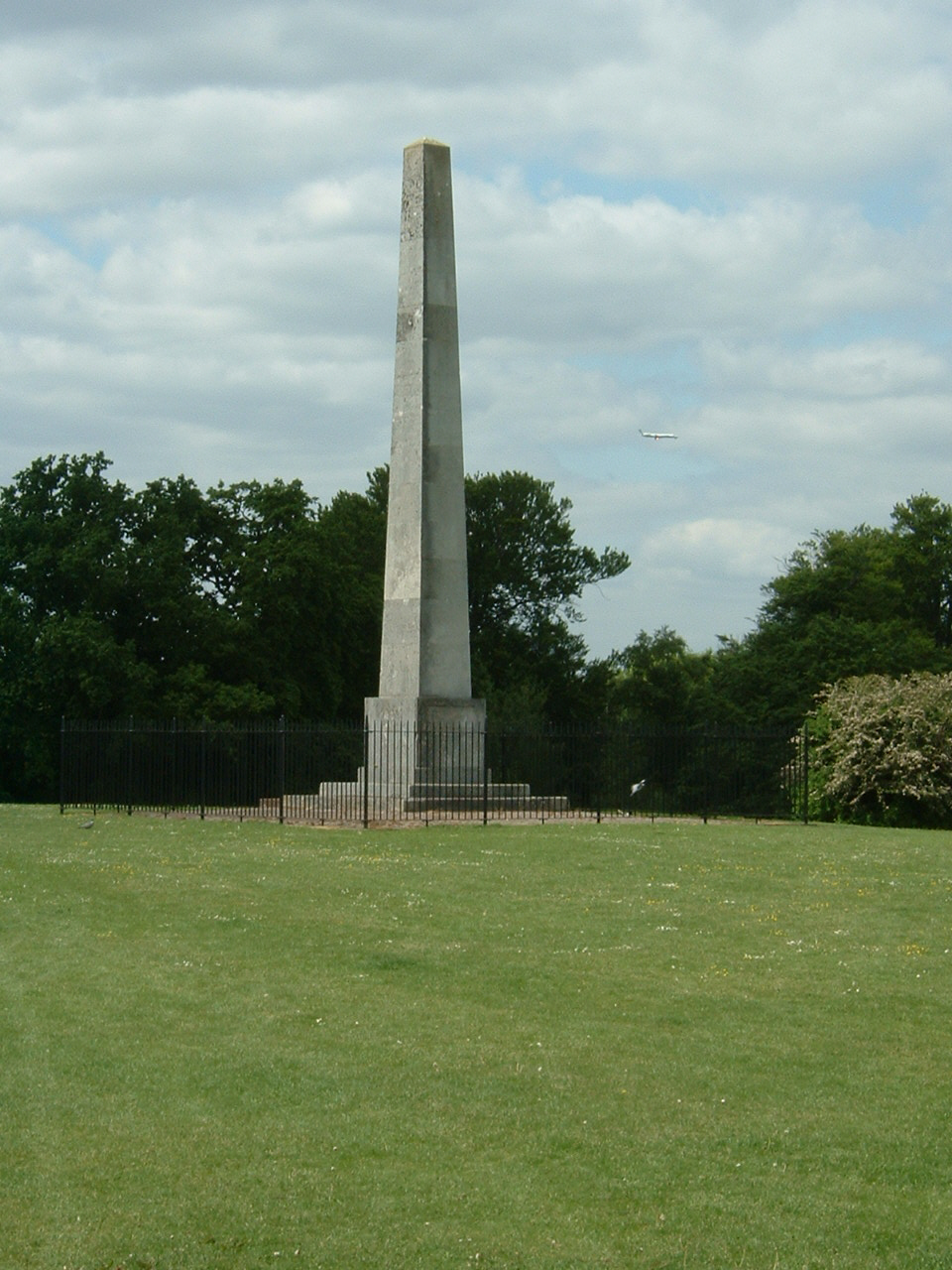

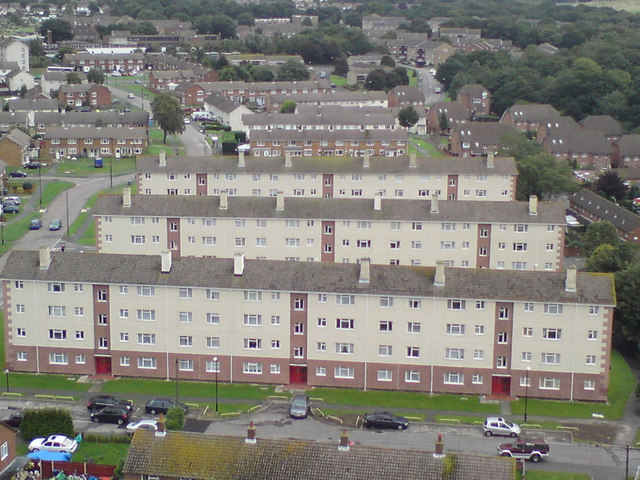

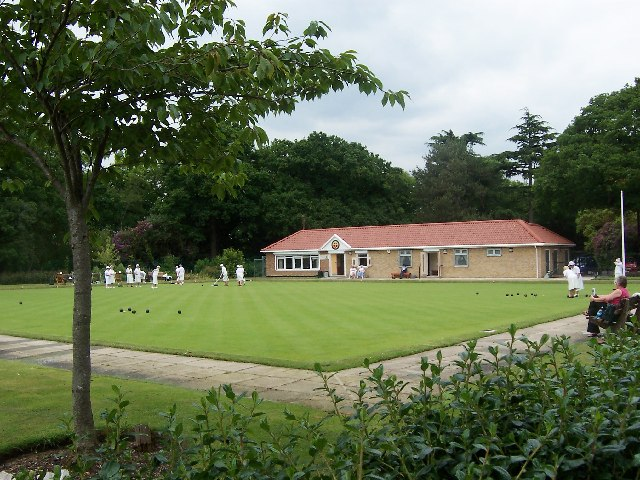

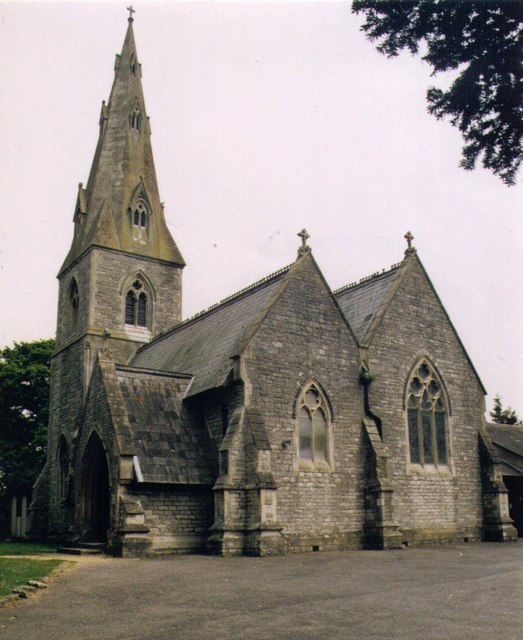
