= John Waldegrave (Royal Navy officer) =

Royal Navy officer

Commander The Honourable John Montagu Granville Waldegrave, DSC RN (29 August 1905 – 18 February 1944) was a British naval commander during World War II.

== Early life ==
Waldegrave was the only son of the Montague Waldegrave, 5th Baron Radstock and his wife, Constance Marion Brodie.

== Naval service ==
Waldegrave commanded the cruiser HMS Vindictive 1938–1939, and the sloop HMS Puffin in 1939. He was awarded the DSC for anti-submarine work performed while commanding the Puffin.

From 1942 to 1943, he served in the Operations Division, attached to shore station HMS President. On 6 September 1943, he was assigned to the cruiser HMS Penelope as executive officer. On 18 February 1944, Penelope was torpedoed by U-410 while returning from Anzio and Cmdr. Waldegrave was lost with the ship.

== Marriage and children ==
On 29 June 1940, Waldegrave married Lady Hersey Boyle (11 July 1914 – 7 February 1993), the second daughter of retired navy man Patrick Boyle, 8th Earl of Glasgow. They had two daughters:

- Hon Horatia Marion Waldegrave (born 1 August 1941), married Oliver John Diggle (b. 19 February 1934) and had three children, Rowena Mary Diggle, John Wyndham Hugh Diggle, and Emma Georgiana Diggle.
- Hon Griselda Hyacinthe Waldegrave (born 6 June 1943), married and had issue.
