= Granville Waldegrave, 2nd Baron Radstock =

British Royal Navy admiral (1786–1857)

Vice-Admiral The Right Honourable The Lord Radstock CB
- Born: 24 September 1786
- Died: 11 May 1857 (aged 70)
- Military career
- Allegiance: Kingdom of Great Britain; United Kingdom
- Branch: Royal Navy
- Service years: 1798–1857
- Rank: Vice-Admiral of the Red
- Commands: HMS Minorca; HMS Thames; HMS Volontaire
- Conflicts: French Revolutionary Wars; Napoleonic Wars
- Awards: Companion of the Order of the Bath

Vice-Admiral Granville George Waldegrave, 2nd Baron Radstock, CB (24 September 1786 – 11 May 1857) was a British naval officer.

== Early life ==
Radstock was born in London in 1786, the elder son of Admiral William Waldegrave, 1st Baron Radstock and his wife, Cornelia Jacoba van Lennep. He succeeded to the peerage upon the death of his father in 1825.

== Royal Navy ==
The eldest son of the 1st Baron Radstock, Radstock joined the Royal Navy in 1798 and rose through the ranks, becoming a captain in 1807, rear admiral in 1841 and Vice-Admiral of the White in 1853 and the Red in 1855.

From 1831 to 1837, he was a Naval aide-de-camp to King William IV and to Queen Victoria from 1837–1841.

== Marriage and children ==
On 7 August 1823, he married Esther Caroline Paget (1800–1874). They had three children:

- Hon Elizabeth Cornelia Waldegrave (born 1824, died 16 April 1903), unmarried.
- Hon Catherine Esther Waldegrave (born 24 May 1826, died 3 July 1898), married Sir Thomas Proctor-Beauchamp, 4th Baronet
- Granville Augustus William Waldegrave, 3rd Baron Radstock (born 10 April 1833, died 8 December 1913)

== Honours ==
Radstock was made a Companion of the Order of the Bath (CB).

== Death ==
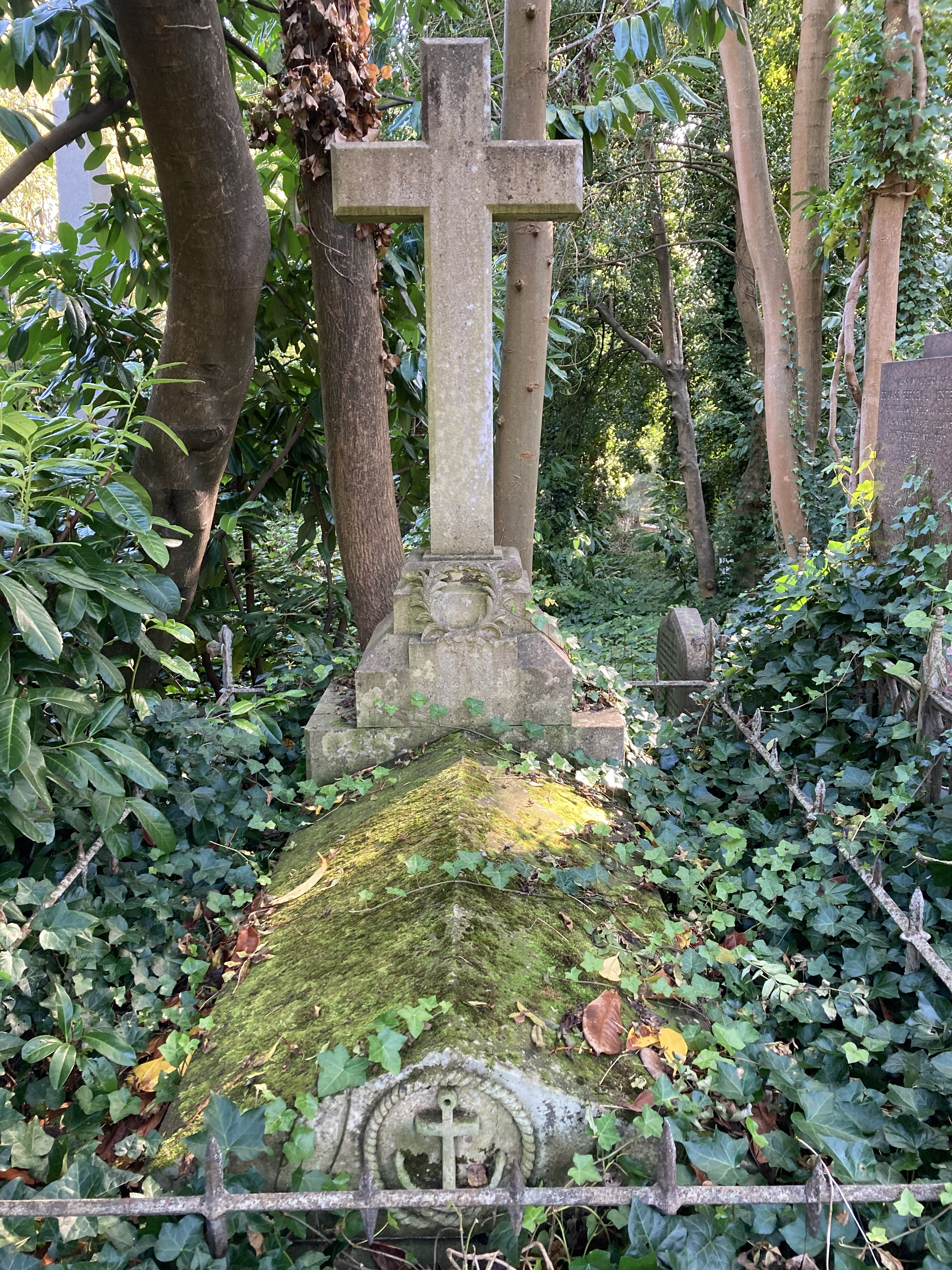
Grave of Granville Waldegrave, 2nd Baron Radstock in Highgate Cemetery

Lord Radstock died in London in 1857, aged 70, and was succeeded in the peerage by his only son, Granville. He is buried on the western side of Highgate Cemetery above the Lebanon Circle.

== Arms ==
Coat of arms of Granville Waldegrave, 2nd Baron Radstock
Crest Out of a ducal coronet Or a plum of five ostrich feathers per pale Argent and Gules a crescent Sable for difference. Escutcheon Per pale Argent and Gules a crescent Sable for difference. Supporters Dexter a talbot reguardant wings expanded and elevated holding in the dexter claw a thunderbolt all Proper. Motto St Vincent

== See also ==
- O'Byrne, William Richard (1849). "Waldegrave, Granville George" . A Naval Biographical Dictionary . John Murray – via Wikisource.

Peerage of Ireland
Preceded by William Waldegrave	Baron Radstock; 1825–1857	Succeeded by Granville Waldegrave
