= Woolston School =

Coordinates: 50°53′47.94″N 1°22′3.09″W

Woolston School Language College

Location
- Porchester Road, Woolston, Southampton,, Hampshire,, SO19 2JD; England

Information
- Type: Comprehensive
- Established: c.1900
- Closed: 18 July 2008
- Local authority: Southampton City Council
- Specialist: Language College
- Department for Education URN: 116452 Tables
- Ofsted: Reports
- Acting Headteacher: Bernadette Hanly
- Staff: 50+
- Gender: Mixed
- Age: 11 to 16
- Enrolment: 770+
- Colour: Red Yellow Black
- Website: http://www.woolston.southampton.sch.uk

Woolston School Language College was a secondary comprehensive school in Southampton, Hampshire, in southern England. The last Ofsted inspection was on 10 October 2006. The school was a Specialist Language College for students that were 11 to 16 years old. There were around 770 pupils enrolled in the school at the time of closure.

As part of Southampton City Council's review of secondary schooling programme called Learning Futures, the school closed in July 2008. It merged with Grove Park Business and Enterprise College in September 2008 to become Oasis Academy Mayfield with the Woolston site finally closing in 2011, and the site being handed back to the Southampton City Council. The new building was completed in 2012, with the first academic commencing 20 February 2012.

== Present ==
Oasis Community Learning took over the Grove Park Business and Enterprise College building and Woolston buildings, with the Woolston site housing the KS4 students, with the KS3 on the Grove site. The Woolston building was finally closed and handed back to the Southampton City Council in July 2011, and the Grove building finally closed in February 2012 when the new academy building was completed. The Grove building was demolished during March, April and May 2012. Woolston School Language College has now been closed, and all students have been moved to the new build of Oasis Academy Mayfield school at Grove Park. The buildings were demolished during April and May 2017 to make way for houses.
