= Weston Park Boys' School =

Coordinates: 50°53′31.75″N 1°20′52.19″W

Grove Park Business and Enterprise College

Location
- The Grove; Southampton, Hampshire; England

Information
- Type: Secondary School
- Closed: 18 July 2008
- Local authority: Southampton
- Head teacher: Eric Freeman
- Gender: Boys
- Age: 11 to 16
- Enrolment: 503 (Jan 2006)
- Website: http://www.grovepark.southampton.sch.uk

Weston Park Boys' School, subsequently renamed Grove Park Business and Enterprise College, was a comprehensive school in east Southampton, Hampshire, in the south of England. The school was closed in 2008 to make way for Oasis Academy Mayfield. The most recent Ofsted inspection was on 17 May 2004.

The inspectors found that "This is an improving school which provides a satisfactory quality of education. Pupils' overall achievement is satisfactory. Teaching and learning are satisfactory. The school has had considerable difficulties in recruiting and retaining staff and this has been a barrier to enhancing pupils' achievement further. The school provides satisfactory value for money."

== History ==
The Southampton Archives Office holds records of admission registers and prospectuses for the school dating from 1959 until its closure in 2008. The school's football team won the national English Schools Under-16 trophy in 2005, beating a school from Blackpool in the final at Selhurst Park.

== Closure ==
There was a surplus of secondary school places in Southampton, and therefore a review of secondary schooling was underway entitled Learning Futures (May 2007). As part of that review, the closure of the school was set for 30 August 2008.

== Present ==
Oasis Community Learning took over the Woolston School and Grove buildings, with the Woolston site housing the KS4 students, with the KS3 on the Grove site. The Woolston building was finally closed and handed back to the Southampton City Council in 2011, and the Grove building finally closed in 2012 when the new academy building was completed. The Grove building was demolished during March, April and May 2012 and demolition of the Woolston site began March 2017.
