= Granville Waldegrave, 4th Baron Radstock =

Irish noble

Granville George Waldegrave, 4th Baron Radstock, CBE (1 September 1859 – 2 April 1937) was a baron in the Peerage of Ireland.

== Biography ==
Radstock was the eldest son of Granville Waldegrave, 3rd Baron Radstock and his wife, Susan Charlotte Calcroft. He was educated at Repton School and graduated from Trinity College, Cambridge with a BA degree.

Radstock succeeded to the barony upon the death of his father on 8 December 1913.

== Honours ==
Radstock was invested as a Commander of the Order of the British Empire (CBE).

== Death ==
Lord Radstock died on 2 April 1937, aged 77. He was unmarried and was succeeded in the peerage by his younger brother Montague Waldegrave, 5th Baron Radstock.

== Arms ==
Coat of arms of Granville Waldegrave, 4th Baron Radstock
Crest Out of a ducal coronet Or a plum of five ostrich feathers per pale Argent and Gules a crescent Sable for difference. Escutcheon Per pale Argent and Gules a crescent Sable for difference. Supporters Dexter a talbot reguardant wings expanded and elevated holding in the dexter claw a thunderbolt all Proper. Motto St Vincent

Peerage of Ireland
Preceded by Granville Waldegrave	Baron Radstock; 1913–1937	Succeeded by Montague Waldegrave
