= Oasis Academy Mayfield =

Location
- The Grove (pedestrian entrance); Ashley Crescent (vehicle entrance); Southampton, Hampshire, SO19 9NA; England

Information
- Type: Academy
- Motto: Kind, Proud, Determined
- Established: 2008
- Local authority: Southampton
- Trust: Oasis Community Learning
- Department for Education URN: 135629 Tables
- Ofsted: Reports
- Principal: Claire Taylor
- Gender: Coeducational
- Age: 11 to 16
- Enrolment: 900
- Colour: Red Blue
- Website: www.oasisacademymayfield.org

Oasis Academy Mayfield is a city academy in Southampton, England, run by Oasis Community Learning (a foundation established by the Oasis Trust) with approximately 900 pupils.

The Academy was established in 2008, when two local secondary schools merged; Woolston School Language College in Porchester Road, Woolston, and Grove Park Business and Enterprise College in the Grove, Weston.

== Description ==
The Academy was established in 2008, when two local secondary schools merged; Woolston School Language College in Porchester Road, Woolston, and Grove Park Business and Enterprise College in the Grove, Weston. Due to the number of combined students, the Academy initially operated as a split site with the Key Stage 3 students (Years 7, 8 & 9) being taught at The Grove and Key Stage 4 students (Years 10 & 11) being taught at Porchester Road.

In the early months of forming a new Academy, both students and staff faced a number of challenges as they adjusted to teaching and learning across the split site. Following a meeting between parents and local MP, John Denham, acting Head Ruth Johnson was replaced by John Toland on 24 November 2008, who officially took up the post of Principal on 2 March 2009.

In 2011 the school was listed as "the worst in the country" based on the lack of progress made by pupils; attendance and attainment were also poor.

On 21 February 2012, students and staff moved into the school's new building.

The school was inspected by Ofsted in 2016 and judged Good. The school was inspected in 2020, with a judgement of Requires Improvement. As of 2025, the school's most recent inspection was in 2024, with a judgement of Good.

== Description ==
Oasis Academy Mayfield is part of the Oasis Community Learning group, and evangelical Christian charity The trust have guided forty schools out of special measures. 19 per cent of the 52 Oasis academies classified as failing. The trust's founder Reverend Steve Chalke says "Turning round a school is sometimes a quick fix, it really, truly is. And sometimes it’s a really long, hard, hard job".

Oasis has a long term strategy for enhancing the performance of its schools. Firstly it has devised a standard curriculum, that each school can safely adopt knowing it will deliver the National Curriculum. Secondly it invests in staff training so they become focused on improving the outcomes for the students. Through the Horizons scheme it provides each member of staff and student with a tablet.

=== Curriculum ===
Numerous maintained schools and academies follow the National Curriculum, with emphasis on delivering a 'broad and balanced curriculum'. Schools endeavour to get all students to achieve the English Baccalaureate qualification- this must include core subjects a modern or ancient foreign language, and either History or Geography.

The academy operates a three-year, Key Stage 3 where all the core National Curriculum subjects are taught.

In Key Stage 4 can continue to study the full English Baccalaureate, with German, French and Spanish on offer, but other options (after discussion) are also available. All will do GCSEs in English Language and Literature, Maths and at least two Sciences, and a humanity.

== Notable attendees ==
- Ally Law, parkour performer and YouTuber
