= St Mary's Church, Bruton =

Coordinates: 51.11159°N 2.45228°W

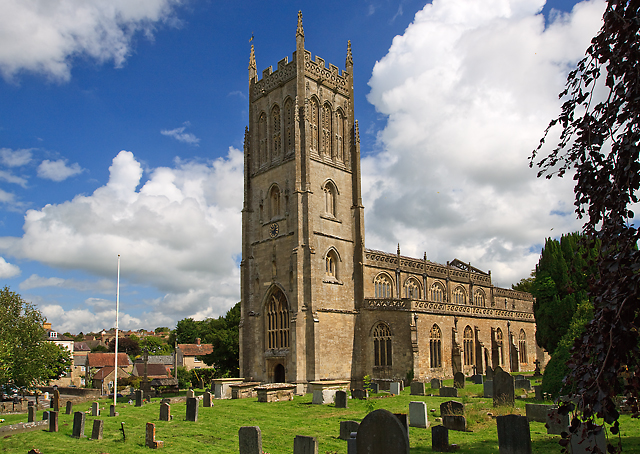
- St Mary's church from the south-west

- Location in Somerset
- Location: Bruton, Somerset
- Country: England
- Denomination: Anglican

Architecture
- Functional status: Parish church
- Style: Gothic, Rococo
- Years built: 1350-1743

Administration
- Province: Canterbury
- Diocese: Bath & Wells
- Archdeaconry: Wells
- Deanery: Bruton and Cary
- Benefice: Bruton, Brewham, Pitcombe and Shepton Montague
- Parish: Bruton with Wyke and Redlynch

Listed Building – Grade I
- Reference no.: 1056408

The Church of St Mary in Bruton, Somerset, England was largely built in the 14th century. Like many Somerset churches, it has a very fine tower; less usually it has a second one as well. Simon Jenkins has called Bruton's tower "Somerset architecture at its most powerful." It has been designated a Grade I listed building.

== History ==
The first church on the site was founded by Ine of Wessex in the 7th century, which grew into an Augustinian priory, becoming Bruton Abbey shortly before the Dissolution of the Monasteries. The church was within the grounds of the abbey so strictly a chapel of it, but always in effect the parish church of the town, with an office and what was perhaps a schoolroom in the north tower above the porch.

The earliest part of the present building is the north aisle and north tower, dating from circa 1350, and the crypt under the chancel from the same period. Together, these three parts formed the original church before it was greatly expanded in the 15th century. In 1445, the construction of the more massive west tower was begun, followed by a new south aisle and central nave. The roof and clerestory were begun in 1506 and finished in 1523. Alterations in the 15th century were also made to the existing north aisle with new tracery.

The chancel was rebuilt in 1743 by Nathaniel Ireson for Sir Charles Berkeley as a shallow tunnel vault with Rococo styling, another unexpected note, possibly on the site of an older chancel. In 1875, the now former rood screen stood under the main tower arch, supporting the organ. It now stands in the north tower, and dates back to 1620. It is Jacobean in design.

The Bruton branch of the Berkeley family have a long association with the town and the church. William Berkeley left Bruton for America becoming colonial governor of Virginia. The church has links with Bruton Parish Church in the restored area of Colonial Williamsburg in Williamsburg, Virginia, USA.

== Architecture ==
It has two towers, the larger of which dates from 1445-1446, and is the furthest south of a type called the "Mendip towers". It is 102.5 feet (31.2 m) high. This is the west tower; the older north tower is unusually placed over the church porch. The west tower is the town's chief landmark, and it can be seen from many places around the town and beyond. The north tower is simpler in design, built of three stages with angled corner buttresses and a stair turret.

The west tower, being built and designed in the Perpendicular Gothic style, is more decorative. It is built of four stages, and features a large six-light 15th century window, a clock face and canopied statue niches. The belfry stage has sets of three 2-light mullioned and transomed windows as arcading, with dividing pinnacled pilasters, crowned with 4 large pinnacles. The west tower was repaired in 1910, which included renewing external stonework and parapets.

The central aisle of the nave is late 15th century, and is classic late Perpendicular Gothic in style, as is the close proximity of the west window to the tower arch. The moulding on the tower arch, described as "triple wave moulding", is said to be unique. The nave roof is of tie beam and king-post construction, and consists of alternating traceried and tie beams.

The chancel is a striking change to the Gothic architecture of the nave, built in the Rococo or Late Baroque style. It has a plaster groin vault, with gold foliage as ribs. The reredos is carved with symbols of the Passion, the Sacraments and the Trinity.

== Bells ==
The bells for the church are housed in the large west tower, and the current peal of six bells is the 9th heaviest peal of six bells hung for change ringing in the world. The present ring of six have a long history, the oldest surviving bell being the present fourth of the ring, dating from 1528 by an unidentified founder. The fifth bell is the next oldest, cast by John Wallis of Salisbury in 1618.

By 1752, there were six bells, as Thomas Bilbie I cast the present treble and third bells. The tenor bell, originally dating from 1528 like the fourth, was recast in 1846 by Charles and George Mears of Whitechapel. Restoration of the tower occurred in 1910, when all six bells were rehung by Llewellins & James of Bristol in a new metal frame, which still holds the bells to this day. In 1930, the tenor bell was recast again by John Taylor & Co of Loughborough and it is this bell that crowns the ring today. It is 52 inches (132 cm) in diameter and weighs 25 and three quarter long hundredweight (1309 kg). It strikes the note D.

The entire ring was again overhauled, this time by Eayre & Smith, in 1997. This included new cast iron headstocks, gudgeons and bearings for the lightest five bells, new clappers and the frame was repainted. There is also a sanctus bell, weighing approximately 1 and a half hundredweight (75 kg), cast by Thomas Bilbie I in 1749, that hangs above the six ringing bells.

== Burials ==
- Maurice Berkeley (died 1581)
- Charles Berkeley, 2nd Viscount Fitzhardinge
- John Berkeley, 5th Baron Berkeley of Stratton
- Maurice Berkeley (died 1617)
- Maurice Berkeley, 3rd Viscount Fitzhardinge
- William Berkeley, 4th Baron Berkeley of Stratton

== Parish ==
The Bruton and District benefice, of which the parish of Bruton with Wyke Champflower and Redlynch is a part, also includes: Batcombe, Brewham, Lamyatt, Pitcombe, Shepton Montague and Upton Noble.

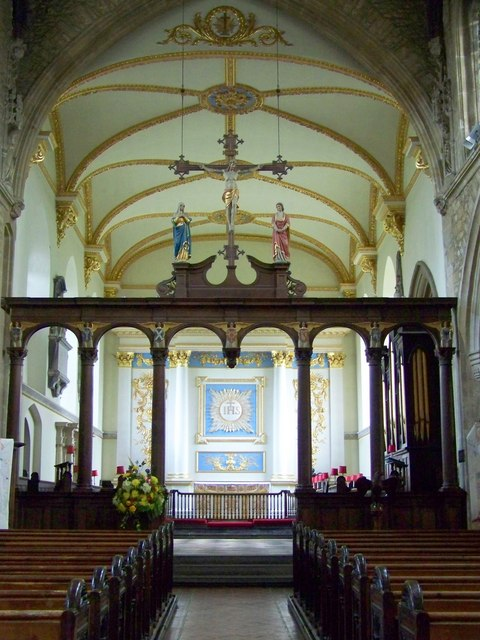
Screen and chancel

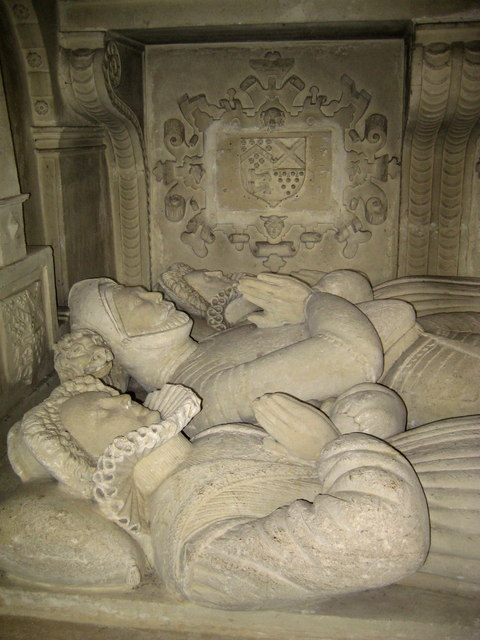
Monument to Sir Maurice Berkeley and his two wives

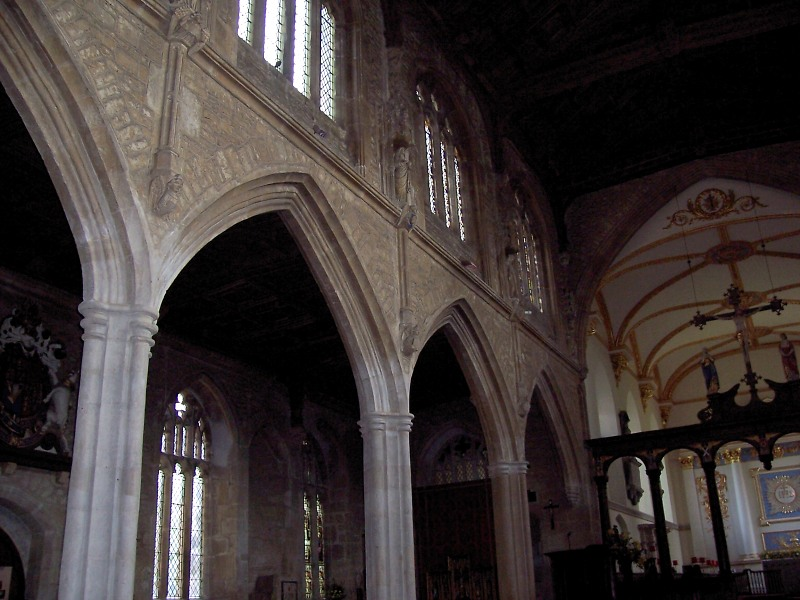
Nave and chancel

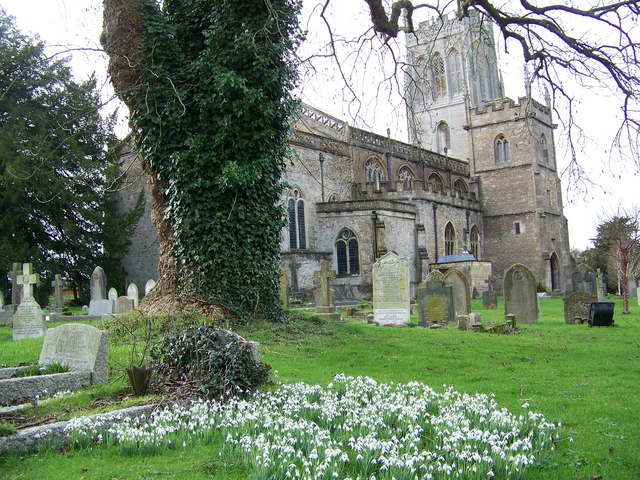
View from the east

== See also ==
- List of Grade I listed buildings in South Somerset
- List of towers in Somerset
- List of ecclesiastical parishes in the Diocese of Bath and WellsNotes
