= Custos Rotulorum of Somerset =

This is a list of people who have served as Custos Rotulorum of Somerset.

- Sir William Portman bef. 1554–1557
- Sir Hugh Paulet bef. 1558–1573
- Sir Amias Paulet bef. 1577–1588
- Sir John Popham bef. 1594–1607
- Sir Edward Phelips 1608–1614
- James Ley, 1st Baron Ley bef. 1621–1625
- Henry Ley, 2nd Earl of Marlborough 1625–1636
- John Coventry 1636–1646
- Interregnum
- William Seymour, 2nd Duke of Somerset 1660
- Charles Berkeley, 2nd Viscount Fitzhardinge 1660–1668
- Henry Somerset, 3rd Marquess of Worcester 1668–1672
- John Seymour, 4th Duke of Somerset 1672–1675
- Maurice Berkeley, 3rd Viscount Fitzhardinge 1675–1688
- Henry Waldegrave, 1st Baron Waldegrave 1688
- Maurice Berkeley, 3rd Viscount Fitzhardinge 1688–1690
- John Berkeley, 4th Viscount Fitzhardinge 1690–1712
- John Poulett, 1st Earl Poulett 1713–1714
- Charles Boyle, 4th Earl of Orrery 1714–1721

For later custodes rotulorum, see Lord Lieutenant of Somerset.
