= Lord Lieutenant of Somerset =

People who have served as Lord Lieutenant of Somerset

This is an incomplete list of people who have served as Lord Lieutenant of Somerset. Since 1714, all Lord Lieutenants have also been Custos Rotulorum of Somerset.

== Lord Lieutenants of Somerset ==
- John Russell, 1st Earl of Bedford 1552–1555
- William Herbert, 1st Earl of Pembroke 12 May 1559 – 17 March 1570
- vacant
- Henry Herbert, 2nd Earl of Pembroke 3 July 1585 – 19 January 1601
- Edward Seymour, 1st Earl of Hertford 24 April 1601 – 6 April 1621
- William Herbert, 3rd Earl of Pembroke 14 April 1621 – 10 April 1630
- Philip Herbert, 4th Earl of Pembroke 12 August 1630 – 30 July 1640 jointly with
- William Seymour, 1st Marquess of Hertford 26 March 1639 – 1642 jointly with
- Philip Herbert, Lord Herbert 30 July 1640 – 1642
- William Russell, 1st Duke of Bedford 25 March 1642 – 23 August 1643 (Parliamentarian)
- Interregnum
- William Seymour, 2nd Duke of Somerset 13 August 1660 – 24 October 1660
- James Butler, 1st Duke of Ormonde 22 December 1660 – 22 August 1672
- John Seymour, 4th Duke of Somerset 22 August 1672 – 29 April 1675
- Heneage Finch, 3rd Earl of Winchilsea 4 June 1675 – 16 July 1683
- Charles Seymour, 6th Duke of Somerset 16 July 1683 – 11 August 1687
- Henry Waldegrave, 1st Baron Waldegrave 11 August 1687 – 6 November 1688
- Ralph Stawell, 1st Baron Stawell 6 November 1688 – 1689
- Maurice Berkeley, 3rd Viscount Fitzhardinge 13 April 1689 – 13 June 1690
- Thomas Osborne, 1st Marquess of Carmarthen 24 June 1690 – 3 February 1691 jointly with
- William Cavendish, 4th Earl of Devonshire 24 June 1690 – 3 February 1691 and
- Charles Sackville, 6th Earl of Dorset 24 June 1690 – 3 February 1691
- James Butler, 2nd Duke of Ormonde 3 February 1691 – 3 December 1714
- Charles Boyle, 4th Earl of Orrery 3 December 1714 – 1 October 1715
- George Dodington 1 October 1715 – 28 March 1720
- George Dodington, 1st Baron Melcombe 20 June 1720 – 17 February 1744
- John Poulett, 2nd Earl Poulett 17 February 1744 – 5 November 1764
- Percy Wyndham-O'Brien, 1st Earl of Thomond 27 November 1764 – 16 March 1774
- Frederick North, 2nd Earl of Guilford 16 March 1774 – 5 August 1792
- John Poulett, 4th Earl Poulett 15 November 1792 – 14 January 1819
- Thomas Thynne, 2nd Marquess of Bath 23 February 1819 – 27 March 1837
- Henry Fox-Strangways, 3rd Earl of Ilchester 28 April 1837 – 1 June 1839
- Edward Portman, 1st Viscount Portman 1 June 1839 – 28 June 1864
- Richard Boyle, 9th Earl of Cork 28 June 1864 – 22 June 1904
- Thomas Thynne, 5th Marquess of Bath 1904 – 9 June 1946
- Sir James Somerville 1946 – 19 March 1949
- William Jolliffe, 4th Baron Hylton 10 August 1949 – 14 November 1967
- Cecil Townley Mitford-Slade 17 April 1968 – 1978
- Sir Walter Luttrell 3 May 1978 – 10 November 1994
- Sir John Wills, 4th Baronet 10 November 1994 – 26 August 1998
- Elizabeth Gass, Lady Gass 12 February 1999 – 2 March 2015
- Anne Maw 2 March 2015 – 29 October 2022
- Mohammed Saddiq 29 October 2022 – present
