= Bevil Skelton =

British foreign envoy and diplomat

Bevil Skelton (1641–1696) was an English foreign envoy and diplomat.

Probably descended from the Skeltons of Armathwaite Castle, Cumberland, Bevil Skelton began his career as a colonel in the British Army, eventually rising to the position of lieutenant-colonel of the Royal English Regiment in France from 1672 to 1674.

Secretary to King Charles II, Skelton spent many years roving between German courts in his capacity as envoy. In March 1685 he became ambassador at the Hague, but it was not, by all account, a successful posting; Skelton was rabidly pro-French, and his hatred of the Dutch was legendary. He quickly 'rendered himself the contempt of the Hollanders.'

In October 1686 he was appointed envoy-extraordinary to France. It was the hope of James to make an ally of France against the Dutch, who he feared would aid William of Orange if he attempted to usurp James's crown. Louis XIV, however, was well aware of the English King's intention, and declared that, was an attempt by England made to poison France against the Dutch, 'he would act as if his own crown was attacked.'

James was forced to publicly deny the charge of insincerity towards Holland, and hastened to find a scapegoat – Skelton became that man.

Recalled to England, Skelton was imprisoned in the Tower - a mere token gesture, as he was released soon after and made Lieutenant of the Tower on 26 November 1688. The Glorious Revolution, only a few weeks later, shortly deprived him of this office. He followed James into exile and continued to be one of his leading diplomats, becoming envoy to the court at Versailles and comptroller of the royal household at Saint-Germain-en-Laye. Due to his long-standing Royalist connections, Skelton became a significant hate figure for Williamite supporters after the Revolution, and the subsequent Whig demonisation of him has tended to colour history's view of the man.

Gilbert Burnet condemned him as "a very weak and passionate man, who neither understands the conduct of affairs, nor can govern his tongue with any sort of temper; for as his passion carries him to fly out on all occasions, so his vanity is so little governed that he discovers all sorts of secrets, even when he can have no other design in it but to let it appear that he knows them".

Skelton was married twice; first to Simona Cary (d. 1687), daughter of Sir Ferdinando Cary and stepdaughter of Sir Thomas Blackwell, then in 1692 to Marie O'Brien (d. 1747), daughter of the 3rd Viscount Clare.

His portrait from life was engraved by Matthias van Sommeren in 1678.

== Notes ==
Diplomatic posts
Preceded by Thomas Chudleigh	English Ambassador to the United Provinces; 1685–1686	Succeeded by Ignatius White
Preceded by Sir William Trumbull	English Ambassador to France; 1686–1688	Succeeded by The Lord Waldegrave
