= List of ambassadors of the Kingdom of England to France =

Ambassador of the Kingdom of England to France L'Ambassadeur anglais en France
- Coat of Arms of England
- Style: His Excellency
- Residence: Paris
- Appointer: The monarch
- Inaugural holder: Charles Somerset, 1st Earl of Worcester; First Ambassador to France 1505; Ambassador to France

The ambassador of the Kingdom of England to France (French: l'ambassadeur anglais en France) was the foremost diplomatic representative of the historic Kingdom of England in France, before the creation of the Kingdom of Great Britain in 1707.

The position was not a continuous one, and there was sometimes no diplomatic representation, due to wars between the two countries.

== English ambassadors and Ministers to France ==
- 1446: Humphrey Stafford, 1st Duke of Buckingham
- 1505: Charles Somerset, 1st Earl of Worcester
- 1514–1515: Charles Brandon, 1st Duke of Suffolk
- 1518–1520: Thomas Boleyn, 1st Earl of Wiltshire
- 1520-1525: Richard Wingfield
- 1529-?: Charles Brandon, 1st Duke of Suffolk
- Periods in 1540s and 1550s: Nicholas Wotton
- 1559–1564: Nicholas Throckmorton
- 1564–1566: Thomas Smith
- 1566: Thomas Hoby
- 1566–1570: Henry Norris, 1st Baron Norreys
- 1570–1573: Francis Walsingham
- 1573–1576: Valentine Dale
- 1576–1579: Amias Paulet
- 1579–1583: Henry Cobham (Henry Brooke)
- 1583–1590: Edward Stafford
- 1591–1592: Henry Unton
  - 1592–1596: Thomas Edmondes Chargé d'affaires
- 1596–1597: Anthony Mildmay
  - 1597–1599: Thomas Edmondes Chargé d'affaires
- 1599–1600: Henry Neville
  - 1601 Thomas Edmondes, Special Ambassador
- 1602–1606: Thomas Parry
  - 1604: James Hay, 1st Earl of Carlisle
  - 1604–1605: Ludovic Stewart, 2nd Duke of Lennox
- 1605–1609: George Carew Resident ambassador
  - 1606: William Godolphin
- 1609–1610: William Beecher Chargé d'Affaires
- 1610–1617: Thomas Edmondes Resident Ambassador
  - 1610: Edward Wotton, 1st Baron Wotton
  - 1616: James Hay, 1st Earl of Carlisle
- 1617–1619: William Beecher Agent (Chargé d'Affaires)
- 1619–1624: Edward Herbert, 1st Baron Herbert of Cherbury Resident Ambassador (but not Sept 1621 to June 1622)
- 1621–1622: James Hay, Viscount Doncaster
  - 1624–1625: Henry Rich, 1st Earl of Holland
  - 1624–1625: James Hay, 1st Earl of Carlisle
- 1624–1625: George Goring, 1st Earl of Norwich Agent
  - 1625: George Villiers, 1st Duke of Buckingham
- 1625–1627: Edward Barrett, 1st Lord Barrett of Newburgh appointed Resident Ambassador, but did not go
  - 1625: Thomas Lorkin Agent
  - 1625–1626: Henry Rich, 1st Earl of Holland and Dudley Carleton
- 1626–1627: William Lewis Agent
  - 1626: Dudley Carleton, Lord Carleton
  - 1626: Walter Montagu
- 1626–1627: John Hawkins
- 1627–1628: Walter Montagu
  - 1629–1630: Thomas Edmonds, Special mission
- 1629–1640: Réné Augier Agent (with de Vic)
- 1630–1636: Henry de Vic Agent or Chargé d'affaires when there was no ambassador
  - 1630–1631: Walter Montagu Ambassador (3 special missions)
  - 1631–1632: Isaac Wake
  - 1631–1633: Jerome Weston Special Mission
- 1635–1639: John Scudamore, 1st Viscount Scudamore Ambassador Ordinary
- 1636–1641: Robert Sidney, 2nd Earl of Leicester Ambassador Extraordinary
  - 1639–1640: Thomas Windebank
- 1641–1650: Richard Browne Agent (for Charles I, then representing the exiled Charles II)
  - 1642–1643: William Kerr, 3rd Earl of Lothian (for Scots Privy Council and Charles I)
- 1643–1644: George Goring, Lord Goring (for Charles I)
- 1644–1649: Henry Jermyn, Baron Jermyn of St Edmundsbury Ambassador Extraordinary (for Charles I)
- 1644–1651: Réné Augier Agent; then Resident Ambassador (for Parliament)
- 1651–1655: Réné Petit Agent
- 1655–1656: Réné Augier Agent
- 1656–1659: William Lockhart of Lee Ambassador
  - 1658: Thomas Belasyse, Viscount Fauconberg
- 1660: William Crofts, 1st Baron Crofts Ambassador Extraordinary
- 1660–1661: Henry Jermyn, Earl of St Albans Ambassador Extraordinary
  - 1661: Samuel Tuke Ambassador Extraordinary
- 1661-?: William Crofts, 1st Baron Crofts and Laurence Hyde Special Ambassadors
- 1662: Henry Jermyn, Earl of St Albans Ambassador Extraordinary
- 1662–1663: Ralph Montagu Agent?
- 1662–1666: Denzil Holles, 1st Baron Holles Ambassador Extraordinary
- 1666–1668: Henry Jermyn, Earl of St Albans
- 1668: John Trevor
- 1669–1672: Ralph Montagu
  - 1669 and 1670: Charles Sackville, Baron Buckhurst
  - 1670: George Villiers, 2nd Duke of Buckingham
  - 1671: John Belasyse, Baron Belasyse
  - 1671 and 1672: Sidney Godolphin
- 1672–1677: William Perwich Agent (and Chargé d'affaires when no ambassador)
- 1672: Henry Savile, Ambassador
- 1672: Thomas Butler, 6th Earl of Ossory
- 1672–1673: Robert Spencer, 2nd Earl of Sunderland
- 1673: Edward Spragge
- 1673–1675: William Lockhart of Lee
  - 1673: Henry Mordaunt, 2nd Earl of Peterborough, 'made diplomatic contact in France, Apr. 1673, on his way to the Emperor'
  - 1674: Bevil Skelton Secret Mission
- 1675–1676: John Berkeley, 1st Baron Berkeley of Stratton Ambassador Extraordinary
- 1676–1678: Ralph Montagu Ambassador Extraordinary
- 1676–1679: John Brisbane Agent; and then Chargé d'affaires
  - 1677: Louis Duras, 2nd Earl of Feversham Special Ambassador
- 1678–1679: Robert Spencer, 2nd Earl of Sunderland Ambassador Extraordinary
- 1679–1682: Henry Savile, Envoy Extraordinary
- 1682–1685: Richard Graham, 1st Viscount Preston, Envoy Extraordinary
  - 1682: Louis de Duras, 2nd Earl of Feversham, Ambassador Extraordinary'
  - 1683: George Douglas, 1st Earl of Dumbarton Special Ambassador
  - 1683–1684: James Hamilton, Earl of Arran Ambassador Extraordinary
- 1685: John Churchill, Baron Churchill Ambassador Extraordinary
- 1685–1686: William Trumbull Ambassador Extraordinary
- 1686–1688: Bevil Skelton Envoy Extraordinary
- 1688–1689: Henry Waldegrave, 1st Baron Waldegrave Envoy Extraordinary

=== Ambassadors Extraordinary, from 1689 ===
- No representation 1689–1697 due to the Nine Years' War
- 1697–1698: The Earl of Portland
- 1698–1699: The Earl of Jersey
- 1699–1701: The Earl of Manchester
- No representation from 1701 to 1712, due to the War of the Spanish Succession

== After the Union of England and Scotland ==
In 1707 the Kingdom of England became part of the new Kingdom of Great Britain. For missions from the court of St James's after 1707, see List of ambassadors of Great Britain to France.
