= Mohammed Saddiq =

Lord-lieutenant of Somerset, England

Mohammed Habedat Saddiq is Lord-lieutenant of Somerset, as well as an engineer and manager in the utilities-sector. He was born in Leeds, Yorkshire, in June 1970, after his parents arrived in England in the late 1960s from a village in Pakistan.

== Career ==
He has held senior management and engineering positions in the water, waste and renewables sectors, including as founder of green energy business GENeco and director of Swiss Combi Technology. He has also served as executive director of operations at Wessex Water.

In 2020 he was awarded an honorary doctorate from the University of the West of England for enhancing the sustainable development of Bristol.

Saddiq was appointed as Lord-lieutenant of Somerset with effect from 29 October 2022, taking over from Mrs Annie Maw CVO, who retired after eight years in the role.

== Personal life ==
He is married and has five children. He lives in Bath, Somerset.

Honorary titles
Preceded by Anne Maw	Lord-Lieutenant of Somerset; 2022–present	Incumbent
