= Robert Berkeley (MP for Chippenham) =

English politician

Robert Berkeley (1566–1614), of Pattenden, Kent, was an English politician.

== Life ==
He was the son of Sir Maurice Berkeley of Bruton, Somerset by his second marriage to Elizabeth Sands. He was a member (MP) of the parliament of England for Chippenham in 1601.

He married Elizabeth Lougher, whose father was a civil lawyer and had at least four sons and two daughters. He died in 1614 and was buried in Canterbury cathedral.
