= Maurice Berkeley, 3rd Viscount Fitzhardinge =

English politician

Sir Maurice Berkeley

Lord Lieutenant of Somerset
- In office 1689–1690

Custos Rotulorum of Somerset
- In office 1688–1690

Member of Parliament for Bath
- In office 1681–1690

Custos Rotulorum of Somerset
- In office 1675–1688

Member of Parliament for Wells
- In office 1661–1679

Personal details
- Born: 1628
- Died: 13 June 1690 (aged 61–62)
- Spouse(s): Anne Lee (m. 1649); Mary Rutley
- Children: 4
- Parent: Sir Charles Berkeley (father)
- Relatives: Berkeley family, Bruton branch John Berkeley (uncle)
- Military career
- Allegiance: United Kingdom
- Unit: Irish Life Guards

Maurice Berkeley, 3rd Viscount Fitzhardinge PC (Ire) FRS (1628 – 13 June 1690), known as Sir Maurice Berkeley, Bt from 1660 to 1668, was an English politician, of the Bruton branch of the Berkeley family.

== Early life ==
Maurice was the eldest son of Sir Charles Berkeley and his wife Elizabeth Killigrew, and was baptized on 15 June 1628. His father was the head of the branch of the Berkeley family founded by Maurice Berkeley, which was seated at Bruton, Somerset.

Unlike his relatives, he took no part in the English Civil War. On 1 January 1649, he married Anne Lee, the daughter of Sir Henry Lee, 1st Baronet, by whom he had two daughters. He also had two natural sons by Mary Rutley. Anne was the stepdaughter of Robert Rich, 2nd Earl of Warwick, the Parliamentary Lord High Admiral.

== Career ==
Berkeley held local office under the Protectorate: he was a commissioner of assessment for Somerset in 1657, and was again appointed to the commission in January 1660. In March he was appointed to the militia commission and the commission of the peace for Somerset.

Appointed a captain of militia horse in April 1660, he obtained a pass to travel overseas and brought to the court of Charles II the news of Monck's declaration in favour of restoration. He was rewarded with a baronetcy on 2 July 1660, and was appointed to the household the Duke of Gloucester in May; however, Gloucester died of smallpox in September and his appointment lapsed. In June, he was appointed an extraordinary gentleman of the privy chamber to the King. Berkeley also briefly enjoyed two revenue posts as treasurer and receiver of the Dunkirk garrison from December 1660 to 1661, and joint agent for wine licenses from 1661 to 1662. Locally, he was appointed to the commission for oyer and terminer on the Western circuit in July and for sewers in Somerset in December.

In the 1661 election, he was returned as a Member of Parliament for Wells. He was moderately active in the Cavalier Parliament, serving on 72 committees, but was much abroad in Ireland. There he served as vice-president of Connaught from 1662 to 1666: his uncle, John Berkeley, 1st Baron Berkeley of Stratton, was Lord President of Connaught, although Maurice was more closely attached in politics to the Duke of Ormonde. Berkeley was also appointed to the Privy Council of Ireland in 1663 and sat in the Parliament of Ireland from 1665 to 1666. He was a commissioner of excise accounts in that country from 1666 to 1667.

In England, he was appointed to the commission on loyal and indigent officers in Bristol in 1662 and was made a deputy lieutenant of Somerset. From 1673 to 1679, he was a commissioner of assessment for Wells, and from 1667 to some time before 1679, was a colonel of militia foot in Somerset. In 1667, Berkeley was elected a Fellow of the Royal Society. He was appointed Custos Rotulorum of Somerset in 1675.

In 1668, he became a gentleman of the privy chamber in ordinary, and held the office until the death of Charles II in 1685. He was captain of an independent troop of cavalry in 1667 and in 1685, and of a troop of Irish Life Guards from 1676 to 1685. He succeeded his father as Viscount Fitzhardinge, an Irish peerage originally created for his younger brother, in 1668.

In the spring 1679 election, Berkeley was defeated in Somerset; he was again defeated in the October election while standing for Bath. He was removed from the Somerset commission of assessment in 1680.

He was returned for Bath in the 1681 election and continued to represent it until his death. Made a freeman of Bath in 1679, he was chosen high steward of the town in 1685.

He was removed as a deputy lieutenant of Somerset in 1687, from the Somerset commission of the peace in February 1688, and as high steward of Bath in August 1688. In October 1688 he was re-appointed a JP in Somerset and to the high stewardship. After the Glorious Revolution, he declined to vote on the transfer of the throne to William and Mary. He was appointed Lord Lieutenant of Somerset in 1689 and returned to the commission for assessment of the county; in 1690, he was also appointed to the commission for assessment for Bath. He died on 13 June 1690 and was succeeded by his younger brother John in his Irish peerage, while his English baronetcy became extinct.

Parliament of England
Preceded by Henry Bull; Thomas White	Member of Parliament for Wells; 1661–1679; With: The Earl of Arran 1661–1671; John Hall 1673–1679	Succeeded by Edward Berkeley; William Coward
Preceded by Sir George Speke; Sir Walter Long	Member of Parliament for Bath; 1681–1690; With: Sir William Bassett	Succeeded by Sir William Bassett; Joseph Langton
Honorary titles
Preceded by The Duke of Somerset	Custos Rotulorum of Somerset; 1675–1688	Succeeded by The Lord Waldegrave
Preceded by The Lord Stawell	Lord Lieutenant of Somerset; 1689–1690	Succeeded by The Marquess of Carmarthen; The Earl of Devonshire; The Earl of Dorset
Preceded by The Lord Waldegrave	Custos Rotulorum of Somerset; 1688–1690	Succeeded by The Viscount Fitzhardinge
Peerage of Ireland
Preceded by Charles Berkeley	Viscount Fitzhardinge; 1668–1690	Succeeded by John Berkeley
Baronetage of England
New creation	Baronet (of Bruton, Somerset); 1660–1690	Extinct
