= Maurice Berkeley (died 1581) =

English politician

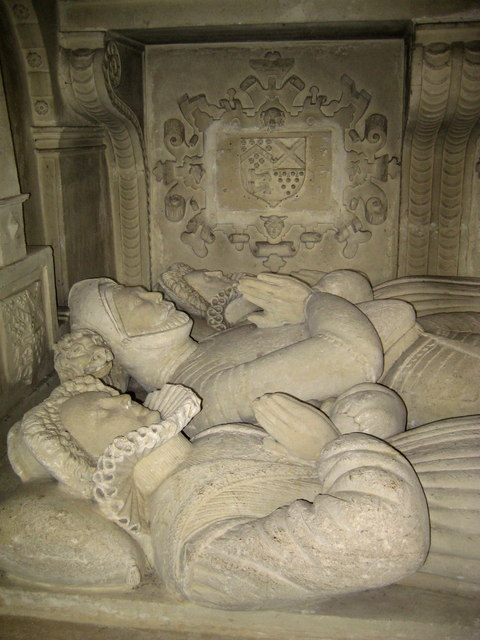
Detail of monument to Sir Maurice and his two wives in the Church of St. Mary, Bruton, Somerset. Arms: Berkeley quartering Botetourt and Zouche

Arms of Berkeley: Gules, a chevron between ten crosses pattée six in chief and four in base argent

Arms of Berkeley of Stoke Gifford, Gloucestershire: Gules, a chevron ermine between ten crosses pattée six in chief and four in base argent. Also arms of descendants Berkeley of Bruton, Somerset, and of Berkeley of Pylle, Somerset and of Baron Berkeley of Stratton. A difference of Berkeley of Berkeley Castle, Gloucestershire

Sir Maurice Berkeley (by 1514–1581) of Bruton in Somerset and of Berkeley House, Clerkenwell, Middlesex, served as Chief Banner Bearer of England to Kings Henry VIII and Edward VI and to Queen Elizabeth I, and rose rapidly in the Tudor court. He came from a cadet branch of the great Berkeley family of Berkeley Castle in Gloucestershire, but in his career, his initial advantage was due to his mother's second marriage to Sir John FitzJames, Lord Chief Justice of the King's Bench 1526–1539, which by 1538 had brought him into the household of Thomas Cromwell, from which he passed into the royal household by 1539.

He built a mansion house on the site of Bruton Priory in Somerset, which he acquired following the dissolution of the monasteries, incorporating some of the monastic buildings, but this was demolished in 1786. Sir Maurice's impressive Renaissance monument, with recumbent effigies of himself and his two wives, survives in the later rebuilt chancel of the Church of St. Mary, Bruton. His descendants, known as "Berkeley of Bruton" included many notable figures until the 18th century, including five Barons Berkeley of Stratton (extinct in 1773), and four Viscount Fitzhardinges (extinct in 1712), as well as William Berkeley, Governor of Virginia. Today Berkeley Square, Berkeley Street, Bruton Street and Stratton Street in Mayfair cover the site of the demolished Berkeley House, their London townhouse. Portraits of himself and his second wife by Federico Zuccari (c.1540/1–1609), in England from 1574, survive at Berkeley Castle.

== Origins ==
He was a younger son of Richard Berkeley of Stoke Gifford, in Gloucestershire, a descendant of Sir Maurice de Berkeley (1298–1347), of Uley, Gloucester, a younger son of Maurice de Berkeley, 2nd Baron Berkeley (died 1326). This Sir Maurice, before being killed at the Siege of Calais in 1347, had acquired Stoke Gifford in 1337, and founded the line of Berkeley of Stoke Gifford. The branch's relation to the main Berkeley line was renewed by a marriage between the elder brother of the Tudor Sir Maurice and his remote cousin, the daughter of the Baron Berkeley at the time.

== Career ==
Although he apparently never studied law at the Inns of Court, his stepfather Sir John FitzJames, Lord Chief Justice of the King's Bench, got him a job "in the office of the Prothonotary of the Common Pleas", and by 1535 wanted to appoint him as clerk to his own circuit. But Cromwell wanted to place his own man in this role, and a deal seems to have been done. By 1537 at the latest, he was a member of Thomas Cromwell's household and beginning to accumulate lands and money. He moved to the royal household a year before Cromwell's fall, and was a Gentleman of the Privy Chamber to King Henry VIII from 1539 to his death in 1547 and to his son King Edward VI until his death in 1553. With his background he was able to redirect his career into the military and commanded "a troop of light horse" in France in 1544 during the Italian War of 1542–46, being knighted on his return. He was appointed Constable of Berkeley Castle in 1544, and Chief Banner Bearer of England in 1545, succeeding his elder brother. He (probably) received New Year gifts from the queen in 1543 and 1544, and was bequeathed 200 marks in Henry VIII's will. He was a Protestant and kept a low profile during the reign of the Catholic Queen Mary, resuming his rise under her Protestant successor Queen Elizabeth. He had signed the "device" settling the crown on Lady Jane Grey, but was pardoned, losing his position as banner bearer. When Wyatt's rebellion collapsed in 1554, it was Berkeley to whom Thomas Wyatt the Younger surrendered.

He was a member of parliament for Somerset in 1547, 1563 and 1572 and for Bletchingley in March 1553. He was a justice of the peace in 1559 and served as Sheriff of Dorset and Sheriff of Somerset for 1567–68.

=== Builds Berkeley House ===
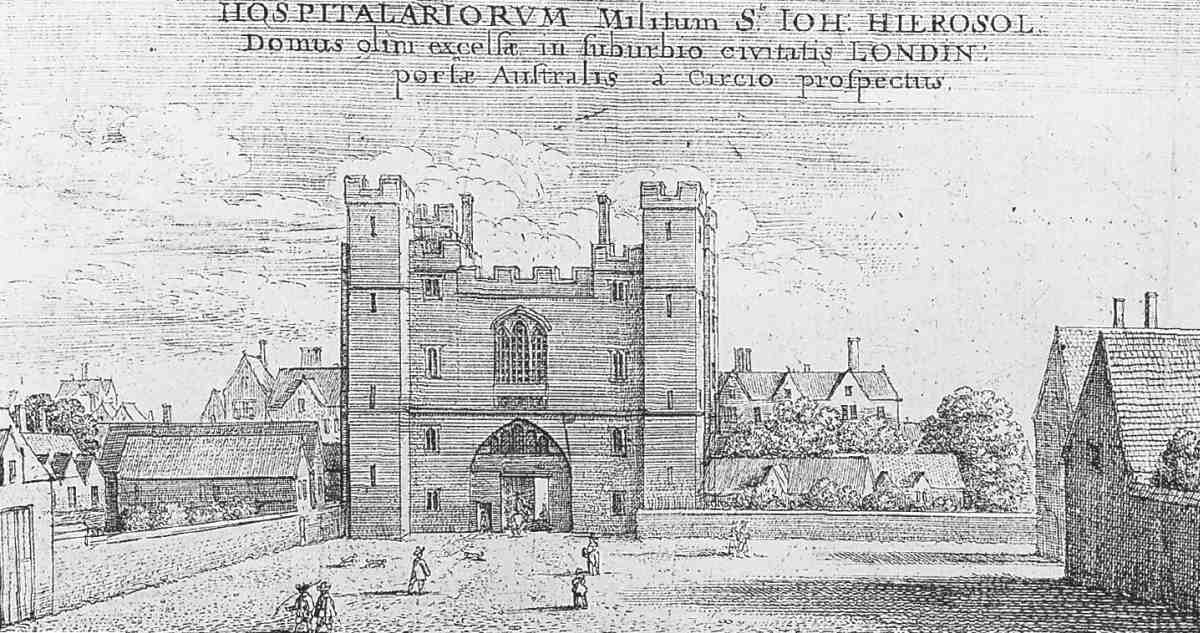
St. John's Gate, Clerkenwell, north front, in 1661, depicted by Wenceslaus Hollar. Behind the gate to the right is Berkeley House.

Shortly before his death, he built Berkeley House in Clerkenwell, a brick-built mansion of H- or U-plan. Until the 1680s it was the residence of his very distant cousin George Berkeley, 1st Earl of Berkeley, 9th Baron Berkeley (1627–1698), following which the house was for a short time a centre of Roman Catholicism, under Father Maurus Corker, a Benedictine. Berkley (sic) Street was named after the House, but was later renamed Briset Street; in the early 1700s, the site was built over with terraced housing.

== Marriages ==
Berkeley married twice:

- Firstly to Katherine Blount, widow of John Champernown (died c. 1541) lord of the manor of Modbury in Devon, and a daughter of William Blount, 4th Baron Mountjoy, by his third wife, Alice Keble (d.1521), a daughter of Henry Keble, Lord Mayor of London. By Katherine Blount he had three sons and five daughters, including:
  - Henry Berkeley, a member of parliament for Somerset;
  - Sir Francis Berkeley;
  - Edward Berkeley;
  - Anne Berkeley, m. Sir Nicholas Poyntz, eldest son and heir of Matthew Poyntz, MP;
  - Elizabeth Berkeley, m. James Perceval and had issue.
- Secondly in 1562 he married Elizabeth Sondes (1533–1585), one of Queen Elizabeth's gentlewomen, the daughter of Anthony Sondes of Throwley in Kent, by whom he had two further sons and a daughter.
  - Robert Berkeley (1566–1614), Member of Parliament for Chippenham;
  - Margret Berkeley;
  - John Berkeley.

She died at Berkeley House, Clerkenwell, and was buried in that parish in the Church of St. James, where she had a monument "comprising a stone altar-tomb, surmounted by Corinthian pillars, supporting a pediment: beneath the latter lay a figure of her ladyship; in the costume of her time, the hands broken off and the head of a negro at her feet. Above was a coat of arms in relief, consisting of fifteen quarterings, but without crest or motto. The inscription ran thus":

THE LADI ELIZABETH BARKLEY OF THE QUENE HER MATTES BEDE CHAMBER AND SECOND WIFE TO SVR MAVRICE BARKLE KNIGHT DECEASED: STANDERD BEARER TO HER MTIE TO HER FATHER & TO HIR BROTHER DEPARTED THIS LVFE IN THIS PARISH THE 16 OF JUNE 1585 BEINGE 52 YEARES OVLDE IN THE FAYTH OF IESUS CHRIST & WAS BVRIED IN THE FLOWER VNDER THIS TOOME: THIS LADI WAS THE DAVGHTER OF ANTHONY SONDES ESQVIER. SHE HAD CHILDREN Too Sonnes & One Davghter Robert Margret & John

The body of this lady had been preserved by embalming, and was found entire, dressed according to the fashion of her age, and with brown gloves on her hands. The coffin was immediately closed up.
