= Somerset =

County in South West England

- Ceremonial county
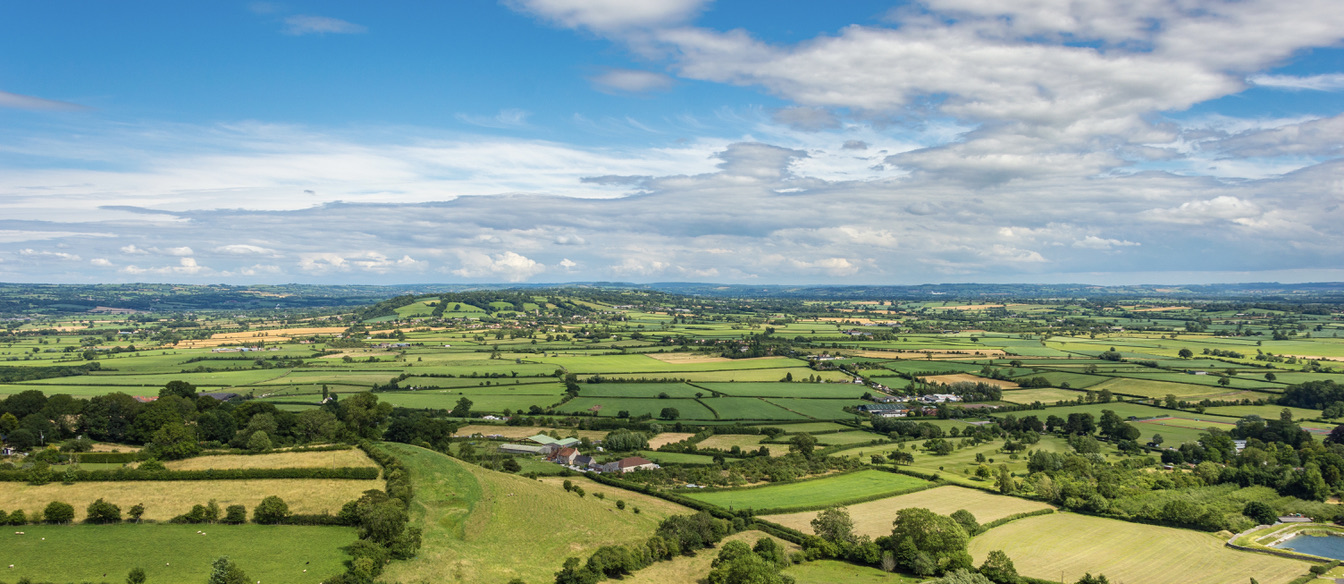
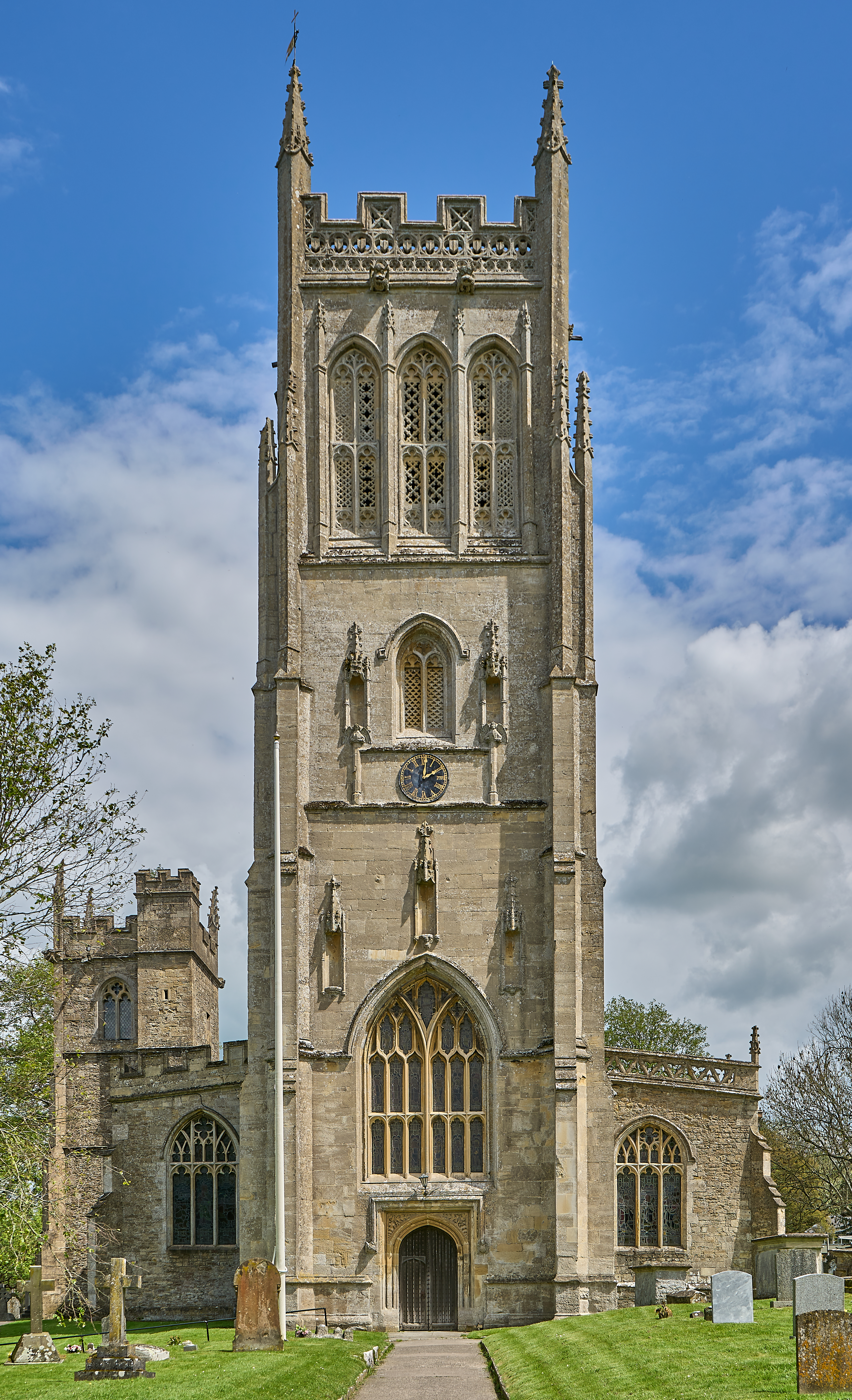
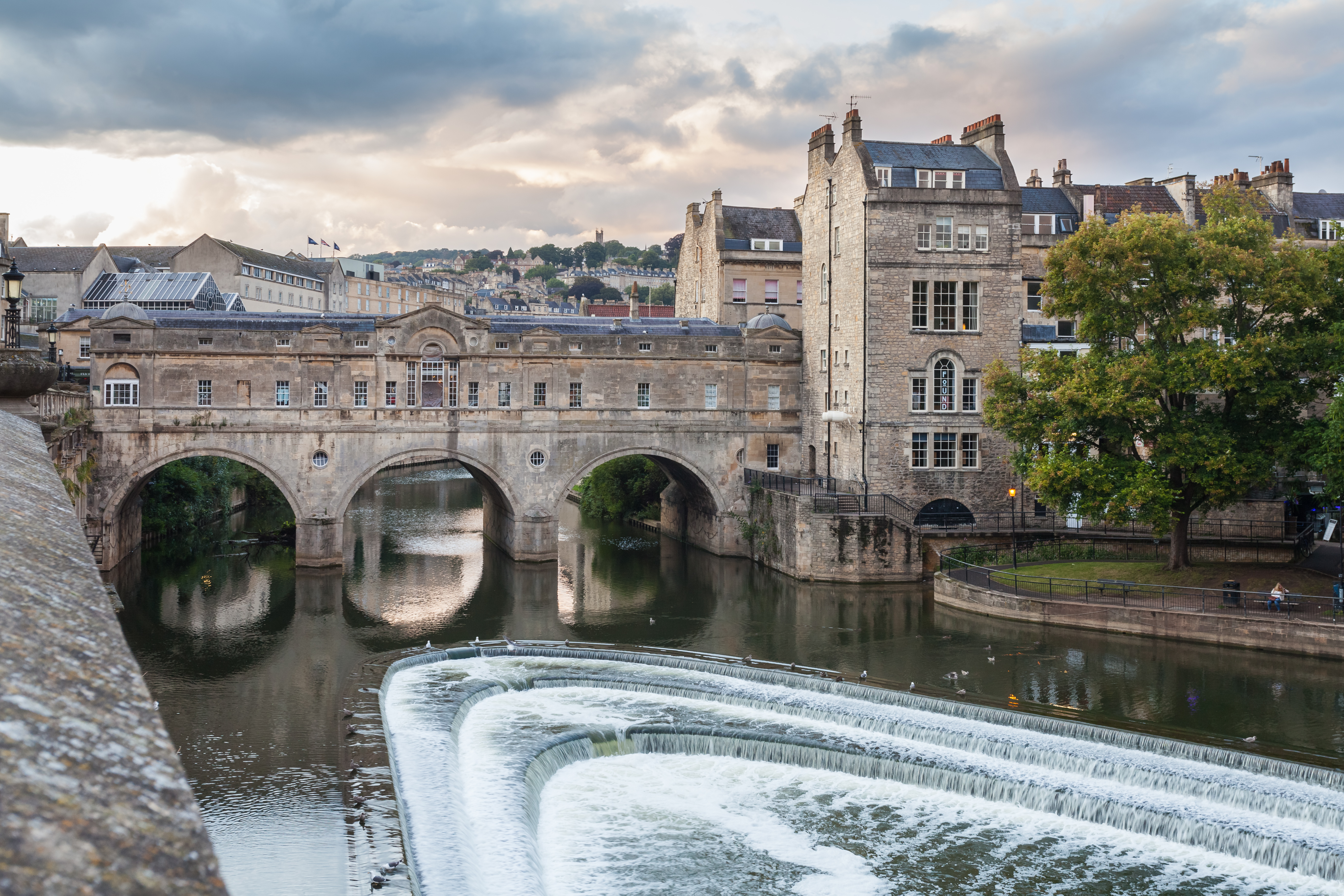
- The Somerset Levels from Glastonbury Tor; St Mary's Church, Bruton; and Pulteney Bridge, Bath

- Coordinates: 51°06′N 2°54′W
- Sovereign state: United Kingdom
- Constituent country: England
- Region: South West England
- Established: Ancient
- Time zone: UTC+0 (GMT)
  - Summer (DST): UTC+1 (BST)
- UK Parliament: 9 MPs
- Police: Avon and Somerset Police
- County town: Taunton
- Largest city: Bath
- Ceremonial county
- Lord Lieutenant: Mohammed Saddiq
- High Sheriff: Peter Charles Dixon
- Area: 4,170 km^{2} (1,610 sq mi)
  - Rank: 7th of 48
- Population (2024): 1,012,934
  - Rank: 22nd of 48
  - Density: 243/km^{2} (630/sq mi)
- Unitary authorities
- Councils: Somerset Council; Bath and North East Somerset Council; North Somerset Council
- Unitary authority
- Council: Somerset Council
- Control: Liberal Democrat
- Admin HQ: Taunton
- Area: 3,450 km^{2} (1,330 sq mi)
  - Rank: 5th of 296
- Population (2025): 590,972
  - Rank: 4th of 296
  - Density: 171/km^{2} (440/sq mi)
- ISO 3166-2: GB-SOM
- GSS code: E06000066
- ITL: TLK23
- Website: somerset.gov.uk
- Districts
- Districts of Somerset; Unitary
- Districts: 1. Somerset; 2. North Somerset; 3. Bath and North East Somerset

Somerset (/ˈsʌmərsɛt, -sɪt/ SUM-ər-set, -sit), archaically Somersetshire (/ˈsʌmərsɛt.ʃɪər, -sɪt-, -ʃər/ SUM-ər-set-sheer, -sit-, -shər), is a ceremonial county in South West England. It is bordered by the Bristol Channel, Bristol, and Gloucestershire to the north, Wiltshire to the east, Dorset to the south-east, and Devon to the south-west. The largest settlement is the city of Bath.

Somerset is a predominantly rural county, especially to the south and west, with an area of 4,171 km^{2} (1,610 sq mi) and an estimated population of 1,012,934 in 2024. Bath is in the north-east of the county, Yeovil in the south-east, Taunton in the south-west, and the seaside resort of Weston-super-Mare in the north-west. The city of Wells, the second-smallest city by population in England, is located in the centre. For local government purposes, the county comprises three unitary authority areas: Bath and North East Somerset, North Somerset, and Somerset. Bath and North East Somerset Council is a member of the West of England Combined Authority.

The centre of Somerset is dominated by the Levels, a coastal plain and wetland. The north-east contains part of the Cotswolds uplands and all of the Mendip Hills, which are both national landscapes; the west contains the Quantock Hills and part of the Blackdown Hills, which are also national landscapes, and most of Exmoor, a national park. The major rivers of the county are the Avon, which flows through Bath and then Bristol, and the Axe, Brue, and Parrett, which drain the Levels.

There is evidence of Paleolithic human occupation in Somerset, and the area was subsequently settled by the Celts, Romans and Anglo-Saxons. The county played a significant part in Alfred the Great's rise to power, and later the English Civil War and the Monmouth Rebellion. In the later medieval period, its wealth allowed its monasteries and parish churches to be rebuilt in grand style; Glastonbury Abbey was particularly important, and claimed to house the tomb of King Arthur and Guinevere. The city of Bath is famous for its Georgian architecture, and is a UNESCO World Heritage Site. The county is also the location of Glastonbury Festival, one of the UK's major music festivals.

== Toponymy ==
Somerset's name most likely derives from Old English Sumorsǣte, short for Sumortūnsǣte, meaning "the people living at or dependent on Sumortūn" (now known as Somerton). An alternative suggestion is that the name derives from Seo-mere-saetan meaning "settlers by the sea lakes". The same ending can also be seen in the neighbouring Dorset. The first known use of Somersæte is in the law code of King Ine who was the Saxon King of Wessex from 688 to 726 CE, making Somerset along with Hampshire, Wiltshire and Dorset one of the oldest extant units of local government in the world.

The Old English name is used in the motto of the county, Sumorsǣte ealle, meaning "all the people of Somerset". Adopted as the motto in 1911, the phrase is taken from the Anglo-Saxon Chronicle. Somerset was a shire of the Anglo-Saxon kingdom of Wessex, and the phrase refers to the wholehearted support the people of Somerset gave to King Alfred in his struggle to save Wessex from Viking invaders.

Somerset settlement names are mostly Anglo-Saxon in origin (for example, Bath, Somerton, Wells and Keynsham), but numerous place names include British Celtic elements, such as the rivers Frome and Avon, and names of hills. For example, an Anglo-Saxon charter of 682 refers to Creechborough Hill as "the hill which in the British language is Cructan and which to us is Crychbeorh". Some modern names are wholly Brittonic in origin, like Tarnock, Priddy and Chard, while others have both Saxon and Brittonic elements, such as Pen Hill.

== History ==
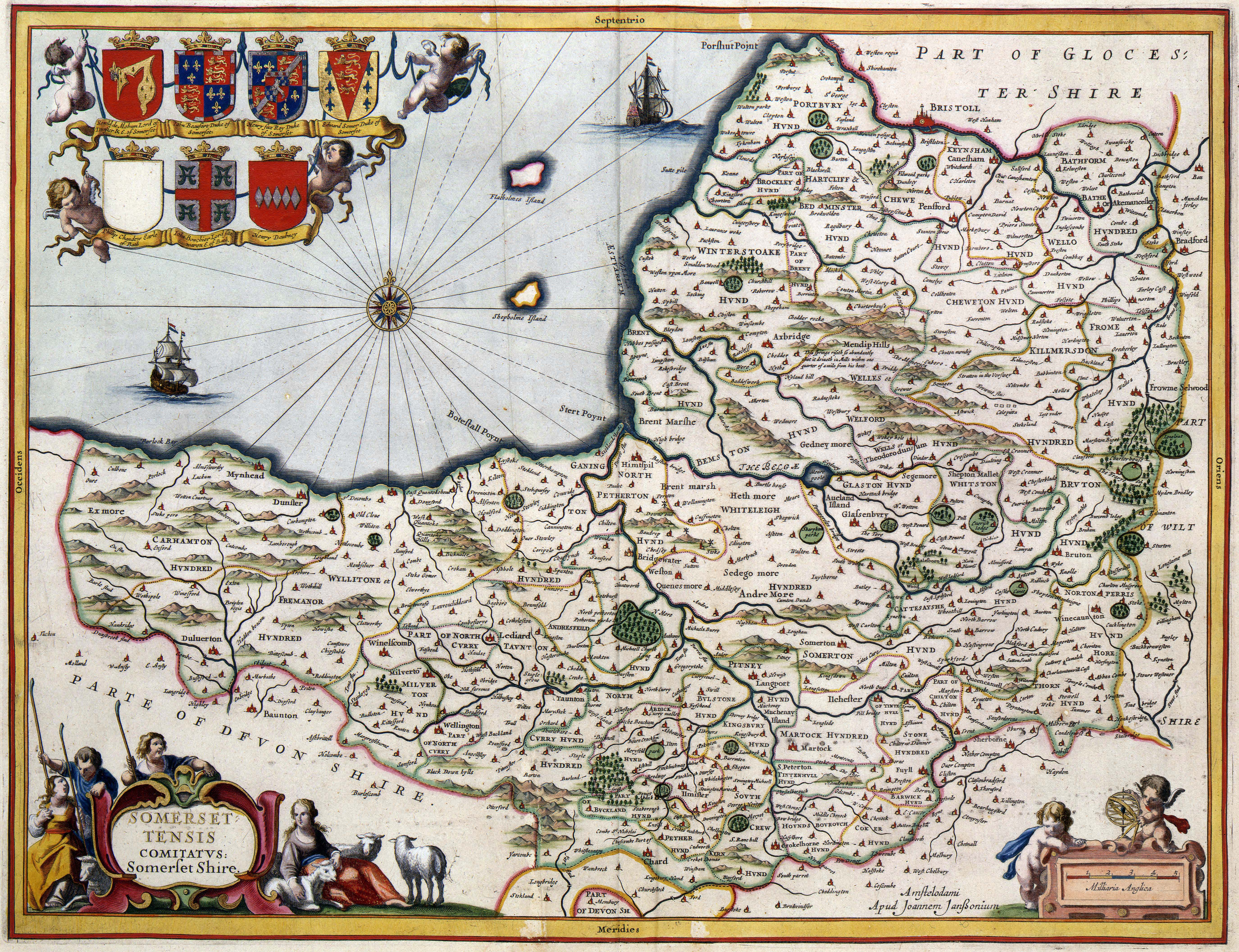
A map of the county in 1646, author unknown

=== Prehistory ===
The caves of the Mendip Hills were settled during the Palaeolithic period, and contain extensive archaeological sites such as those at Cheddar Gorge. Bones from Gough's Cave have been dated to 12,000 BCE, and a complete skeleton, known as Cheddar Man, dates from 7150 BCE. Examples of cave art have been found in Aveline's Hole. Some caves continued to be occupied until modern times, including Wookey Hole.

The Somerset Levels—specifically dry points at Glastonbury and Brent Knoll—also have a long history of settlement, and are known to have been settled by Mesolithic hunters. Travel in the area was facilitated by the construction of one of the world's oldest known engineered roadways, the Sweet Track, which dates from 3807 BCE or 3806 BCE. (Note: A 6,000-year-old trackway was discovered in Belmarsh prison in 2009.)

The exact age of the henge monument at Stanton Drew stone circles is unknown, but it is believed to be Neolithic. There are numerous Iron Age hill forts, some of which, like Cadbury Castle and Ham Hill, were later reoccupied in the Early Middle Ages.

=== Roman invasion ===
On the authority of the future emperor Vespasian, as part of the ongoing expansion of the Roman presence in Britain, the Second Legion Augusta invaded Somerset from the south-east in 47 CE. The county remained part of the Roman Empire until around 409 CE, when the Roman occupation of Britain came to an end. A variety of Roman remains have been found, including Pagans Hill Roman temple in Chew Stoke, Low Ham Roman Villa and the Roman Baths that gave their name to the city of Bath.

=== Saxon and Norman invasions ===
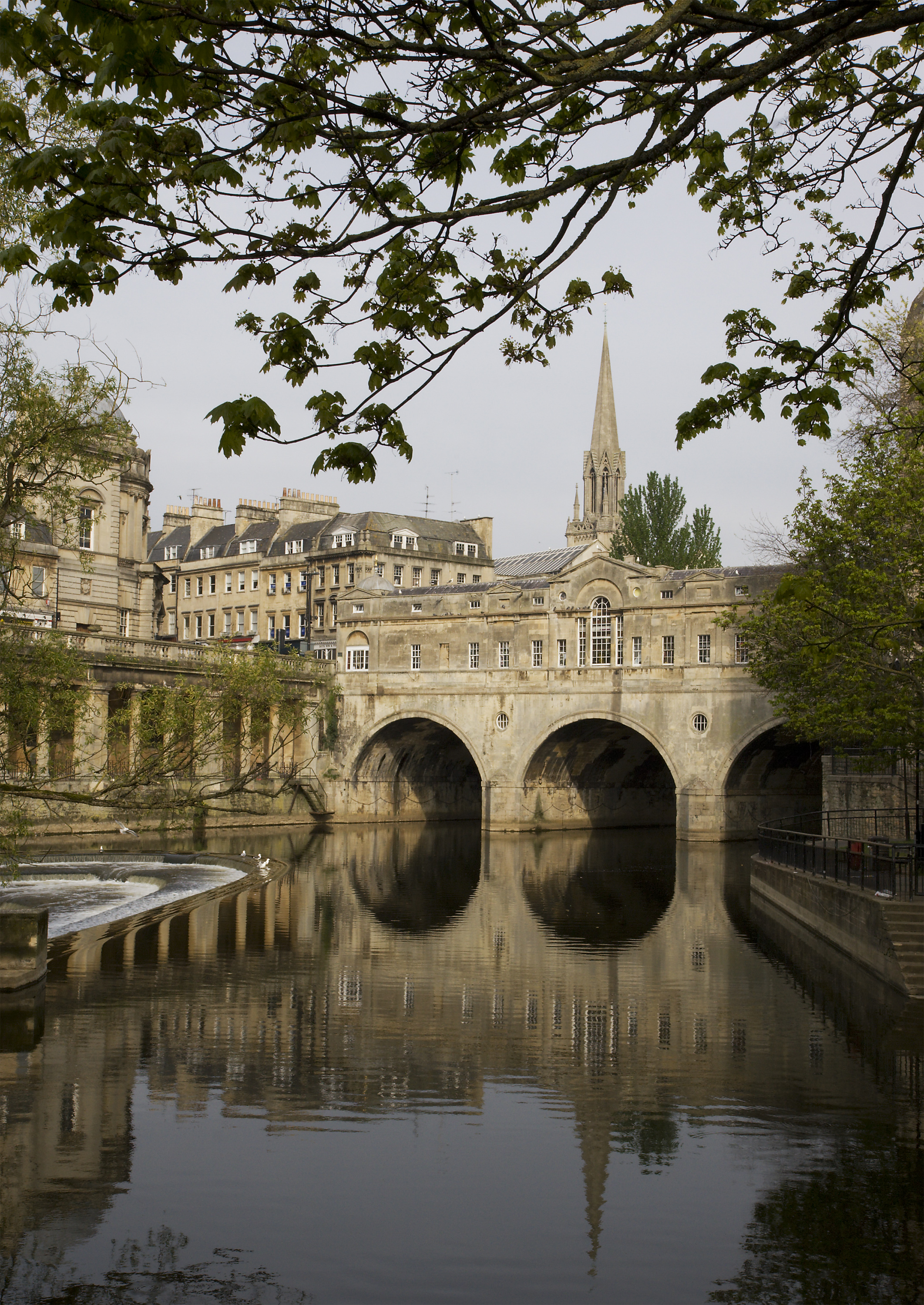
Palladian Pulteney Bridge at Bath

After the Romans left, Britain was invaded by Anglo-Saxon peoples. By 600 CE they had established control over much of what is now England, but Somerset was still in native British hands. The British held back Saxon advance into the south-west for some time longer, but by the early eighth century King Ine of Wessex had pushed the boundaries of the West Saxon kingdom far enough west to include Somerset. The Saxon royal palace in Cheddar was used several times in the 10th century to host the Witenagemot.

The nature of the relations between the Britons and the Saxons in Somerset is not entirely clear. Ine's laws demonstrate that the Britons were considered to be a significant enough population in Wessex to merit provisions; however, the laws also suggest that Britons could not attain the same social standing as the Saxons, and that many were slaves. In light of such policies, many Britons might have chosen to emigrate to places such as Brittany while those who remained would have had incentives to adopt Anglo-Saxon culture.

After the Norman Conquest, the county was divided into 700 fiefs, and large areas were owned by the crown, with fortifications such as Dunster Castle used for control and defence. Somerset came under the political influence of several different nobles during the Middle Ages. During the Wars of the Roses, an important magnate was Humphrey Stafford, earl of Devon, whose wider influence stretched from Cornwall to Wiltshire. After 1485, one of the county's most influential figures was Henry VII's chamberlain Giles Daubeney.

=== The 17th–19th centuries ===
Somerset contains HM Prison Shepton Mallet, which was England's oldest prison still in use prior to its closure in 2013, having opened in 1610. During the English Civil War, Somerset was largely Parliamentarian, with key engagements being the Sieges of Taunton and the Battle of Langport.

In 1685, the Monmouth Rebellion was played out in Somerset and neighbouring Dorset. The rebels landed at Lyme Regis and travelled north, hoping to capture Bristol and Bath, but they were defeated in the Battle of Sedgemoor at Westonzoyland, the last pitched battle fought in England. Arthur Wellesley took his title, Duke of Wellington, from the town of Wellington; he is commemorated on a nearby hill by a large, spotlit obelisk, known as the Wellington Monument.

The Industrial Revolution in the Midlands and Northern England spelt the end for most of Somerset's cottage industries. Farming continued to flourish, and the Bath and West of England Society for the Encouragement of Agriculture, Arts, Manufactures and Commerce was founded in 1777 to improve farming methods. Despite this, two decades later, agriculturist John Billingsley conducted a survey of the county's agriculture in 1795 and found that agricultural methods could still be improved.

Coal mining was an important industry in north Somerset during the 18th and 19th centuries, and by 1800 it was prominent in Radstock.

The Somerset Coalfield reached its peak production by the 1920s. All the pits have now been closed, the last in 1973. Most of the surface buildings have been removed, and apart from a winding wheel outside Radstock Museum, little evidence of their former existence remains. Further west, the Brendon Hills were mined for iron ore in the late 19th century; this was taken by the West Somerset Mineral Railway to Watchet Harbour for shipment to the furnaces at Ebbw Vale.

=== 20th century ===
Many Somerset soldiers died during the First World War, with the Somerset Light Infantry suffering nearly 5,000 casualties. War memorials were put up in most of the county's towns and villages; only nine, described as the Thankful Villages, had none of their residents killed. During the Second World War, the county was a base for troops preparing for the D-Day landings. Some of the hospitals that were built for the casualties of the war remain in use. The Taunton Stop Line was set up to repel a potential German invasion. The remains of its pill boxes can still be seen along the coast, and south through Ilminster and Chard.

A number of decoy towns were constructed in Somerset in World War II to protect Bristol and other towns. They were designed to mimic the nighttime geometry of "blacked out" streets, railway lines, and Bristol Temple Meads railway station, to encourage German bombers away from these targets. One, on the German radio navigation beam flight path to Bristol, was constructed on Beacon Batch. It was laid out by Shepperton Studios, based on aerial photographs of the city's railway marshalling yards. The decoys were fitted with dim red lights, simulating activities such as the stoking of steam locomotives. Burning bales of straw soaked in creosote were used to simulate the effects of incendiary bombs dropped by the first wave of Pathfinder night bombers; meanwhile, incendiary bombs dropped on the correct location were quickly smothered, wherever possible. Drums of oil were also ignited to simulate the effect of a blazing city or town, with the aim of fooling subsequent waves of bombers into dropping their bombs on the wrong location.

The Chew Magna decoy town was hit by half a dozen bombs on 2 December 1940, and over a thousand incendiaries on 3 January 1941. The following night the Uphill decoy town, protecting the airfield at Weston-super-Mare, was bombed; a herd of dairy cows was hit, killing some and severely injuring others.

== Geography ==
=== Boundaries ===
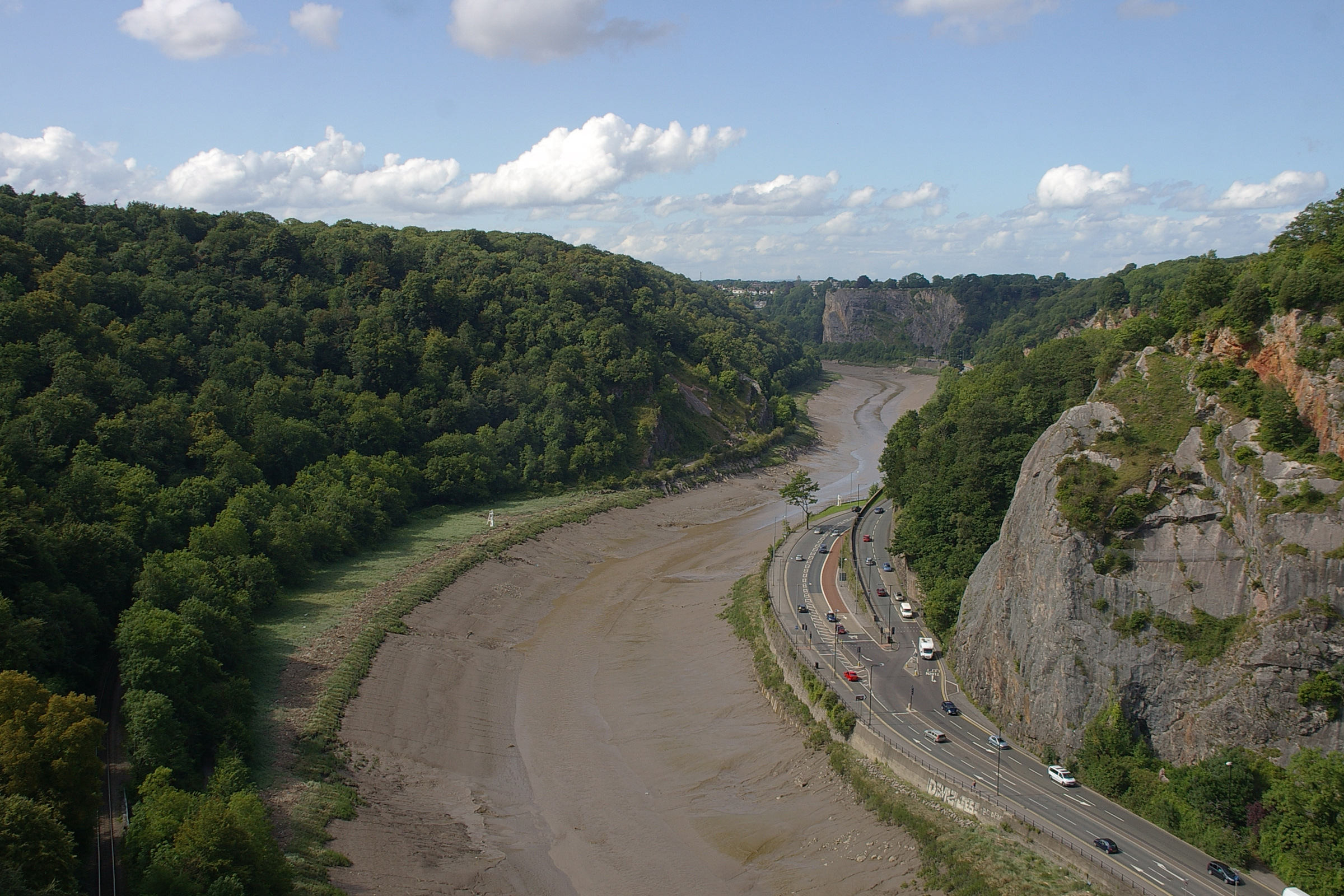
The Avon Gorge, the historic boundary between Gloucestershire and Somerset, and also Mercia and Wessex; Somerset is to the left

The boundaries of Somerset are largely unaltered from medieval times. The main change has been in the north, where the River Avon formed the border with Gloucestershire, except that the hundred of Bath Forum, which straddles the Avon, formed part of Somerset. Bristol began as a town on the Gloucestershire side of the Avon, but as it grew, it extended across the river into Somerset. In 1373 Edward III proclaimed "that the town of Bristol with its suburbs and precincts shall henceforth be separate from the counties of Gloucester and Somerset ... and that it should be a county by itself".

The present-day northern border of Somerset (adjoining the counties of Bristol and Gloucestershire) runs along the southern bank of the Avon from the Bristol Channel, then follows around the southern edge of the Bristol built-up area, before continuing upstream along the Avon and then diverges from the river to include Bath and its historic hinterland to the north of the Avon, before meeting Wiltshire at the Three Shire Stones on the Fosse Way at Batheaston.

Map of the Ceremonial County of Somerset

=== Cities and towns ===
Somerton took over from Ilchester as the county town in the late thirteenth century, but it declined in importance and the status of county town transferred to Taunton about 1366. The county has two cities, Bath and Wells, and 30 towns (including the county town of Taunton). The largest urban areas in terms of population are Bath, Weston-super-Mare, Taunton, Yeovil and Bridgwater.

Many settlements developed because of their strategic importance in relation to geographical features, such as river crossings or valleys in ranges of hills. Examples include Axbridge on the River Axe, Castle Cary on the River Cary, North Petherton on the River Parrett, and Ilminster, where there was a crossing point on the River Isle. Midsomer Norton lies on the River Somer; while the Wellow Brook and the Fosse Way Roman road run through Radstock. Chard is the most southerly town in Somerset and one of the highest, though at an altitude of 126 m (413 ft) Wiveliscombe is the highest town in the county.

=== Green belt ===
The county contains several-miles-wide sections of the Avon green belt area, which is primarily in place to prevent urban sprawl from the Bristol and Bath built up areas encroaching into the rural areas of North Somerset, Bath and North East Somerset, and Mendip districts in the county, as well as maintaining surrounding countryside. It stretches from the coastline between the towns of Portishead and Clevedon, extending eastwards past Nailsea, around the Bristol conurbation, and through to the city of Bath. The green belt border intersects with the Mendip Hills Area of Outstanding Natural Beauty (AONB) along its south boundary, and meets the Cotswolds AONB by its eastern extent along the Wiltshire county border, creating an extended area protected from inappropriate development.

=== Geology ===
Much of the landscape of Somerset falls into types determined by the underlying geology. These landscapes are the limestone karst and lias of the north, the clay vales and wetlands of the centre, the oolites of the east and south, and the Devonian sandstone of the west.

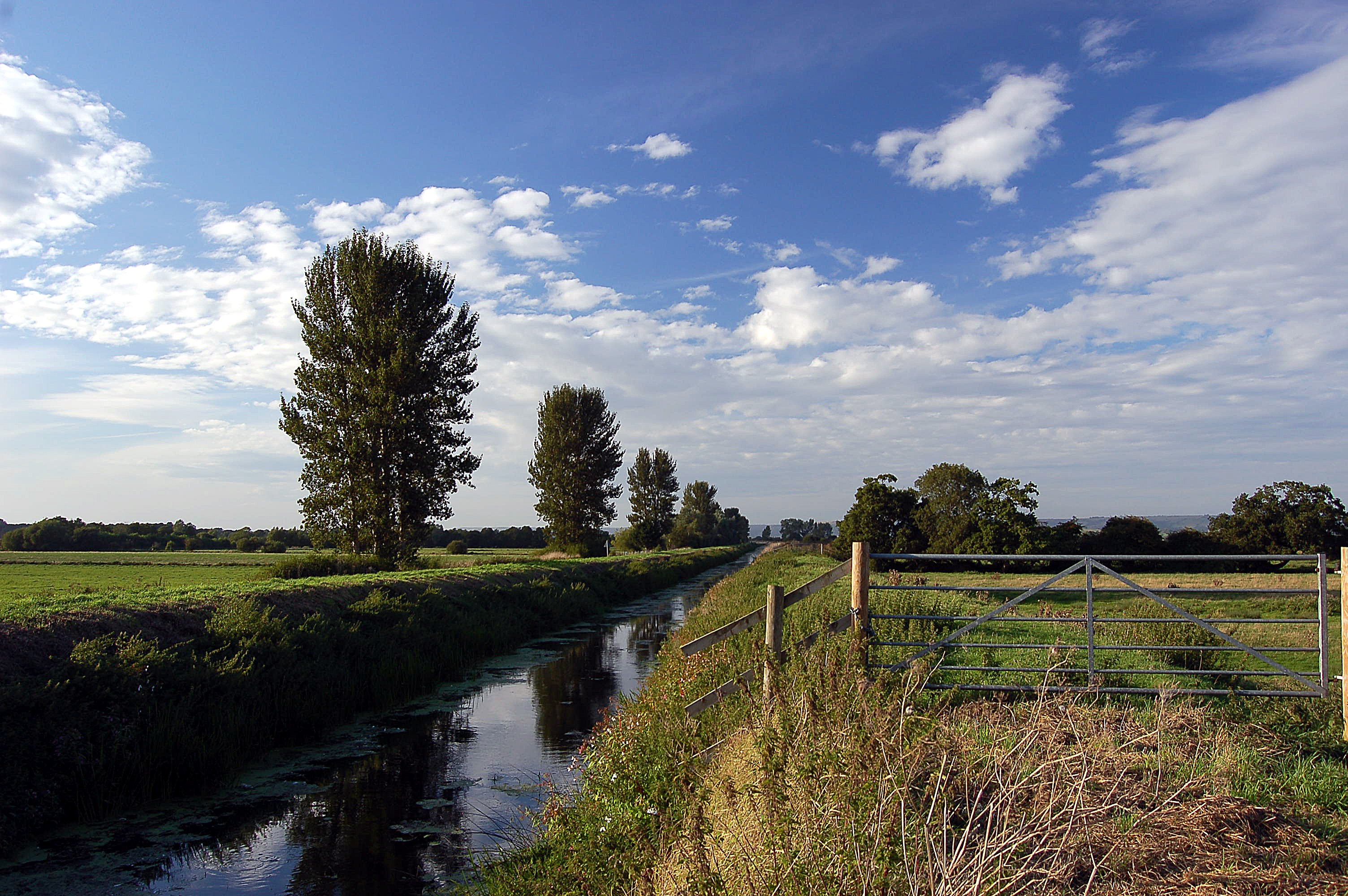
The River Brue in an artificial channel draining farmland near Glastonbury

To the north-east of the Somerset Levels, the Mendip Hills are moderately high limestone hills. The central and western Mendip Hills were designated an Area of Outstanding Natural Beauty in 1972 and cover 198 km^{2} (76 sq mi). The main habitat on these hills is calcareous grassland, with some arable agriculture. To the south-west of the Somerset Levels are the Quantock Hills which was England's first Area of Outstanding Natural Beauty designated in 1956 which is covered in heathland, oak woodlands, ancient parklands with plantations of conifer and covers 99 square kilometres. The Somerset Coalfield is part of a larger coalfield which stretches into Gloucestershire. To the north of the Mendip hills is the Chew Valley and to the south, on the clay substrate, are broad valleys which support dairy farming and drain into the Somerset Levels.

=== Caves and rivers ===
There is an extensive network of caves, including Wookey Hole, underground rivers, and gorges, including the Cheddar Gorge and Ebbor Gorge. The county has many rivers, including the Axe, Brue, Cary, Parrett, Sheppey, Tone and Yeo. These both feed and drain the flat levels and moors of mid and west Somerset. In the north of the county the River Chew flows into the Bristol Avon. The Parrett is tidal almost to Langport, where there is evidence of two Roman wharfs. At the same site during the reign of King Charles I, river tolls were levied on boats to pay for the maintenance of the bridge.

=== Levels and moors ===
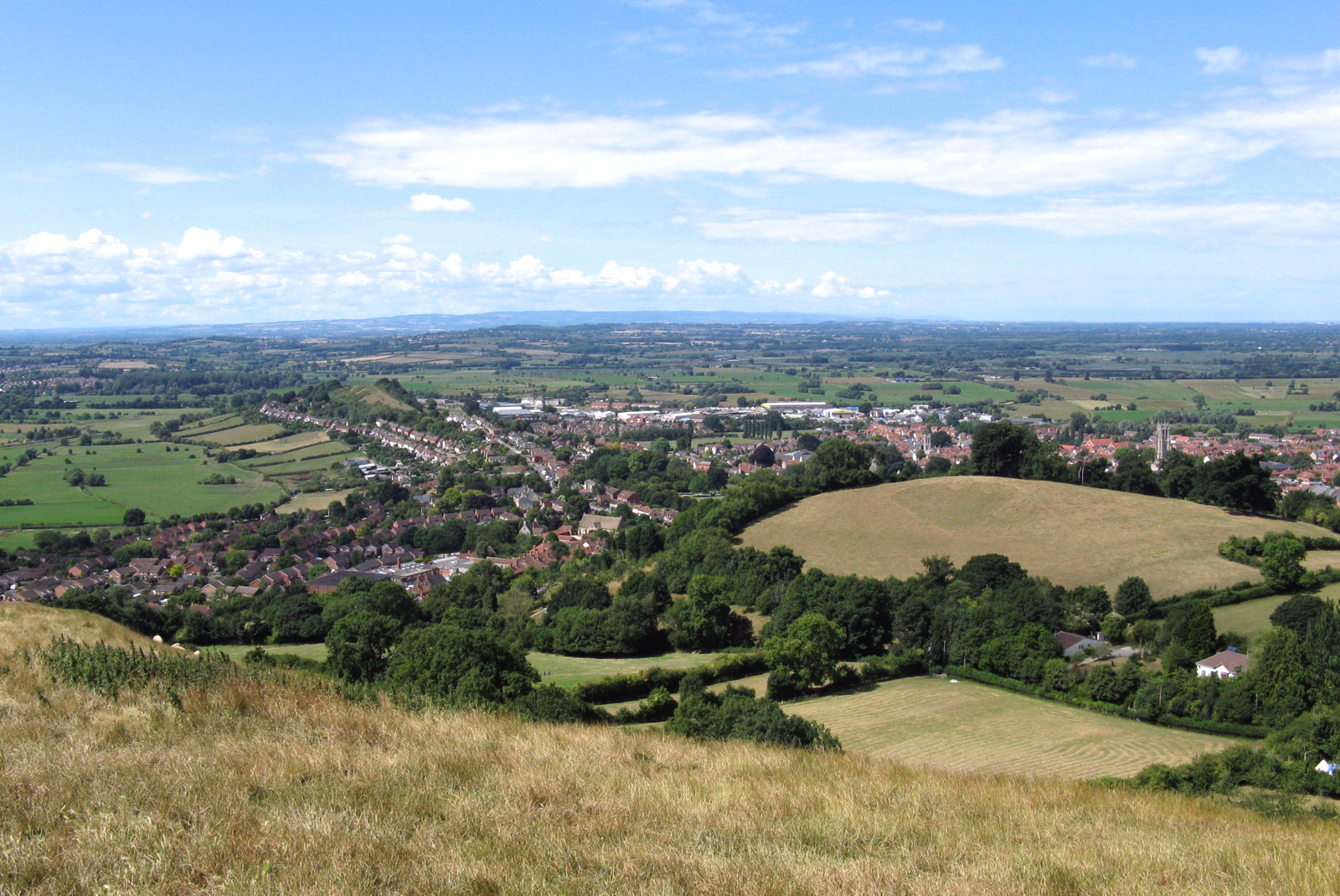
The town of Glastonbury looking west from the top of Glastonbury Tor. The fields in the distance are the Somerset Levels.

The Somerset Levels (or Somerset Levels and Moors as they are less commonly but more correctly known) are a sparsely populated wetland area of central Somerset, between the Quantock and Mendip hills. They consist of marine clay levels along the coast, and the inland (often peat based) moors. The Levels are divided into two by the Polden Hills. Land to the south is drained by the River Parrett while land to the north is drained by the River Axe and the River Brue. The total area of the Levels amounts to about 647.5 square kilometres (160,000 acres) and broadly corresponds to the administrative district of Sedgemoor but also includes the south west of Mendip district. Approximately 70% of the area is grassland and 30% is arable.

Stretching about 32 kilometres (20 mi) inland, this expanse of flat land barely rises above sea level. Before it was drained, much of the land was under a shallow brackish sea in winter and was marsh land in summer. Drainage began with the Romans, and was restarted at various times: by the Anglo-Saxons; in the Middle Ages by the Glastonbury Abbey, during 1400–1770; and during the Second World War, with the construction of the Huntspill River. Pumping and management of water levels still continue.

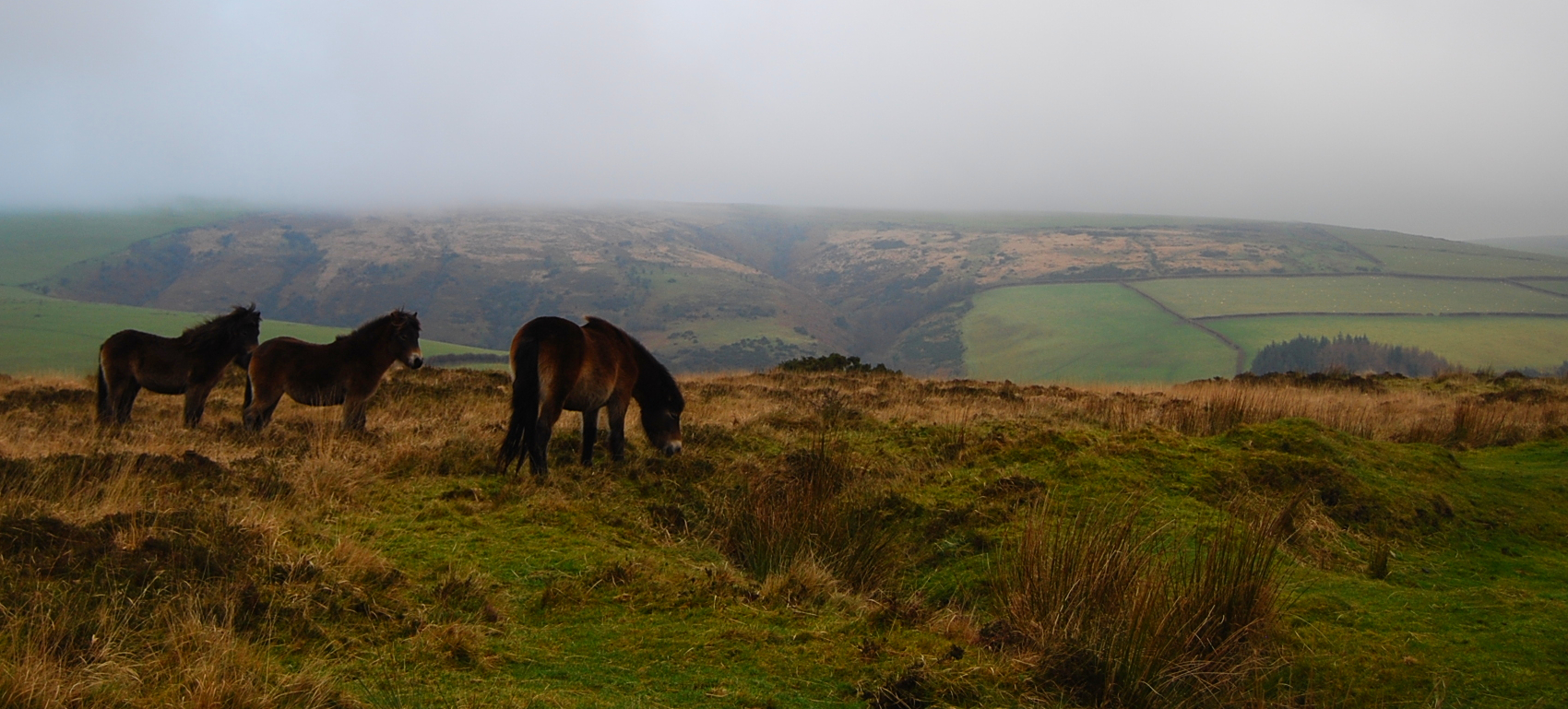
The Exmoor landscape with the native Exmoor Pony

The North Somerset Levels basin, north of the Mendips, covers a smaller geographical area than the Somerset Levels, and forms a coastal area around Avonmouth. It too was reclaimed by draining. It is mirrored, across the Severn Estuary, in Wales, by a similar low-lying area: the Caldicot and Wentloog Levels.

In the far west of the county, running into Devon, is Exmoor, a high Devonian sandstone moor, which was designated as a national park in 1954, under the 1949 National Parks and Access to the Countryside Act. The highest point in Somerset is Dunkery Beacon on Exmoor, with a maximum elevation of 519 metres (1,703 feet). Over 100 sites in Somerset have been designated as Sites of Special Scientific Interest.

=== Coastline ===
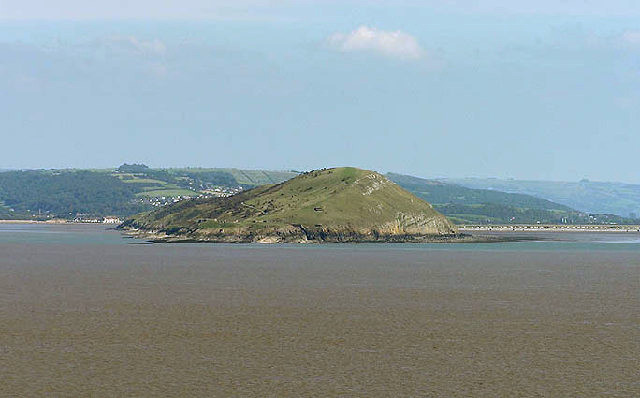
Brean Down from Steep Holm

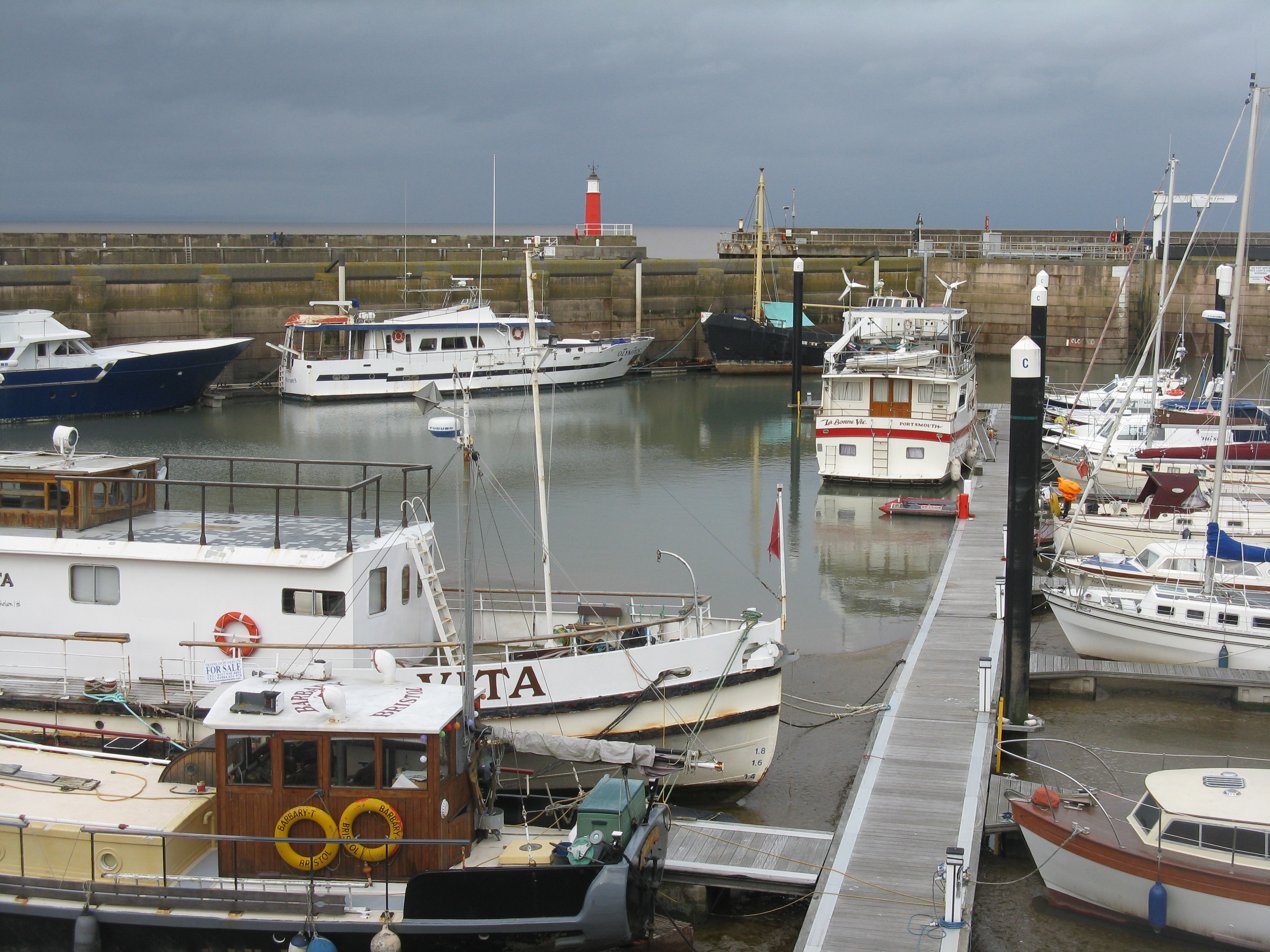
The marina in Watchet

The 64 km (40 mi) coastline of the Bristol Channel and Severn Estuary forms part of the northern border of Somerset. The Bristol Channel has the second largest tidal range in the world. At Burnham-on-Sea, for example, the tidal range of a spring tide is more than 12 metres (39 feet). Proposals for the construction of a Severn Barrage aim to harness this energy. The island of Steep Holm in the Bristol Channel is within the ceremonial county and is now administered by North Somerset Council.

The main coastal towns are, from the west to the north-east, Minehead, Watchet, Burnham-on-Sea, Weston-super-Mare, Clevedon, and Portishead. The coastal area between Minehead and the eastern extreme of the administrative county's coastline at Brean Down is known as Bridgwater Bay, and is a National Nature Reserve. North of that, the coast forms Weston Bay and Sand Bay whose northern tip, Sand Point, marks the lower limit of the Severn Estuary. In the mid and north of the county the coastline is low as the level wetlands of the levels meet the sea. In the west, the coastline is high and dramatic where the plateau of Exmoor meets the sea, with high cliffs and waterfalls.

=== Climate ===
Along with the rest of South West England, Somerset has a temperate climate which is generally wetter and milder than the rest of the country. The annual mean temperature is approximately 10 °C (50.0 °F). Seasonal temperature variation is less extreme than most of the United Kingdom because of the adjacent sea temperatures. The summer months of July and August are the warmest with mean daily maxima of approximately 21 °C (69.8 °F). In winter mean minimum temperatures of 1 °C (33.8 °F) or 2 °C (35.6 °F) are common. In the summer the Azores high pressure affects the south-west of England, but convective cloud sometimes forms inland, reducing the number of hours of sunshine. Annual sunshine rates are slightly less than the regional average of 1,600 hours.

In December 1998, there were 20 days without sun recorded at Yeovilton. Most of the rainfall in the south-west is caused by Atlantic depressions or by convection. Most of the rainfall in autumn and winter is caused by the Atlantic depressions, which are when they are most active. In summer, a large proportion of the rainfall is caused by the sun heating the ground, leading to convection and showers and thunderstorms. Average rainfall is around 700 mm (28 in). About 8–15 days of snowfall is typical. November to March have the highest mean wind speeds, and June to August have the lightest winds. The predominant wind direction is from the south-west.

Climate data for Yeovilton, England (1981–2010) data
Month	Jan	Feb	Mar	Apr	May	Jun	Jul	Aug	Sep	Oct	Nov	Dec	Year
Mean daily maximum °C (°F)	8.1 (46.6)	8.3 (46.9)	10.6 (51.1)	12.9 (55.2)	16.5 (61.7)	19.3 (66.7)	21.7 (71.1)	21.5 (70.7)	18.6 (65.5)	14.8 (58.6)	11.1 (52.0)	9.0 (48.2)	14.4 (57.9)
Daily mean °C (°F)	4.8 (40.6)	4.8 (40.6)	6.7 (44.1)	8.3 (46.9)	11.7 (53.1)	14.5 (58.1)	16.8 (62.2)	16.6 (61.9)	14.1 (57.4)	10.9 (51.6)	7.4 (45.3)	5.7 (42.3)	10.2 (50.4)
Mean daily minimum °C (°F)	1.4 (34.5)	1.3 (34.3)	2.7 (36.9)	3.7 (38.7)	6.8 (44.2)	9.7 (49.5)	11.9 (53.4)	11.7 (53.1)	9.6 (49.3)	6.9 (44.4)	3.6 (38.5)	2.4 (36.3)	6.0 (42.8)
Average precipitation mm (inches)	72.0 (2.83)	55.6 (2.19)	56.5 (2.22)	47.3 (1.86)	48.9 (1.93)	57.2 (2.25)	48.9 (1.93)	56.6 (2.23)	64.5 (2.54)	67.9 (2.67)	65.8 (2.59)	83.3 (3.28)	724.5 (28.52)
Average rainy days	12.5	10.2	10.9	9.2	8.8	8.5	6.9	8.6	10.1	11.3	11.6	12.6	121.2
Mean monthly sunshine hours	50.2	68.9	107.6	155.4	193.1	186.0	205.8	197.8	139.8	101.1	70.2	46.8	1,522.7
Source: Met Office

== Demographics ==
=== Ethnicity ===
In the 2021 census, the ethnic composition of the ceremonial county of Somerset comprised: 95.4% White, 1.9% Asian, 0.6% Black, 1.6% Mixed, and 0.5% Other.

- White (95.4%): English; Welsh; Scottish; Northern Irish or British (90.0%); Irish (0.5%); Gypsy or Irish Traveller (0.1%); Roma (0.1%); and Other White (4.7%).
- Asian (1.9%): Indian (0.6%); Pakistani (0.1%); Bangladeshi (0.2%); Chinese (0.5%); and Other Asian (0.6%).
- Black (0.6%): African (0.3%); Caribbean (0.1%); and Other Black (0.1%).
- Mixed (1.6%): White and Asian (0.6%); White and Black African (0.2%); White and Black Caribbean (0.4%); and Other Mixed or Multiple ethnic groups (0.4%).
- Other (0.5%): Arab (0.1%) and Any other ethnic group (0.4%).

Ethnic groups in Somerset (ceremonial county) (Note: Sub-group totals may not sum exactly to the group total due to rounding. Data for the ceremonial county are aggregated from its constituent unitary authorities)
Ethnic group	2001 census	2011 census	2021 census
White	98.5%	97.2%	95.4%
Asian	0.6% (Note: The 2001 census figures for 'Asian' and 'Other' have been adjusted to reflect the 2011 reclassification of the Chinese ethnic group from 'Other' to 'Asian' to allow comparison across census years.)	1.3%	1.9%
Black	0.2%	0.3%	0.6%
Mixed	0.6%	1.0%	1.6%
Other	0.1%	0.2%	0.5%

=== Religion ===
Religion in Somerset (ceremonial county) (2021 United Kingdom census)
1. Christian (47.8%)
2. No religion (43.6%)
3. Muslim (0.60%)
4. Hindu (0.20%)
5. Buddhist (0.40%)
6. Sikh (0.00%)
7. Jewish (0.10%)
8. Other religion (0.60%)
9. Not stated (6.60%)

In the 2021 census, the religious composition of the ceremonial county of Somerset comprised: 47.8% Christian, 43.6% No religion, 0.6% Muslim, 0.2% Hindu, 0.4% Buddhist, 0.0% Sikh, 0.1% Jewish, 0.6% Other religion, and 6.6% Not stated.

Religion in Somerset (ceremonial county)
Religion	2001 Census	2011 Census	2021 Census
Christian	75.2%	61.9%	47.8%
No religion	16.1%	28.6%	43.6%
Muslim	0.2%	0.4%	0.6%
Hindu	0.1%	0.2%	0.2%
Buddhist	0.2%	0.3%	0.4%
Sikh	0.0%	0.0%	0.0%
Jewish	0.1%	0.1%	0.1%
Other religion	0.4%	0.4%	0.6%
Not stated	7.6%	8.0%	6.6%

=== Population ===
Population of Somerset since 1801
Year	1801	1851	1901	1911	1921	1931	1941	1951	1961	1971	1981	1991	2001	2011	2021
Somerset CC area	187,266	276,684	277,563	280,215	282,411	284,740	305,244	327,505	355,292	385,698	417,450	468,395	498,093	529,972	571,600
BANES	57,188	96,992	107,637	113,732	113,351	112,972	123,185	134,346	144,950	156,421	154,083	164,737	169,045	176,015	193,400
North Somerset	16,670	33,774	60,066	68,410	75,276	82,833	91,967	102,119	119,509	139,924	160,353	179,865	188,556	202,566	216,700
Total	261,124	407,450	445,266	462,357	471,038	479,758	520,396	563,970	619,751	682,043	731,886	812,997	855,694	908,553	981,700

== Governance ==
The ceremonial county immediately prior to the 2023 local government restructuring, with South Somerset (1), Somerset West and Taunton (2), Sedgemoor (3) and Mendip (4) as non-metropolitan districts (shown in pink), and just Bath and North East Somerset (5), and North Somerset (6) as unitary authorities (shown in yellow).

The ceremonial county of Somerset is currently governed by three unitary authorities: Bath and North East Somerset Council (B&NES), North Somerset Council, and Somerset Council. B&NES is also part of the West of England Combined Authority.

Modern local government in Somerset began in 1889, when an administrative county was created and Somerset County Council was established; Bath was administered separately as a county borough.

In 1974, the county and council were abolished and replaced by two two-tier non-metropolitan counties, Somerset and Avon. Somerset was governed by a reconstituted county council and five districts: Mendip, Sedgemoor, South Somerset, Taunton Deane and West Somerset. Taunton Deane was granted borough status that same year. Avon consisted of six districts, of which three were created from areas formerly part of Somerset: Woodspring, Wansdyke, and Bath.

In 1996, Avon was abolished, and its districts were renamed and reorganised into unitary authorities. Woodspring was renamed 'North Somerset', and Wansdyke and Bath were abolished, and a new district covering the same area was created, named 'Bath and North East Somerset'. In 1997 the two districts and non-metropolitan county became part of the new ceremonial county of Somerset. On 1 September 2019 the non-metropolitan districts of West Somerset and Taunton Deane merged, with the new district being called Somerset West and Taunton.

In 2023, the non-metropolitan county was reorganised by abolishing the four districts and their councils and reconstituting Somerset County Council as a unitary authority for the non-metropolitan county, with the powers of both a district and county council, renamed Somerset Council. The two existing unitary authorities were not altered. A previous attempt to reorganise the county as a unitary authority 2007 was rejected following local opposition.

Somerset's local government records date to 1617, longer than those of any other county; a meeting of the Quarter Sessions held at Wells in that year decided that a room should be provided "for the safe keeping of the records of the Sessions".

=== UK Parliament ===
As of 2024, following the 2023 Periodic Review of Westminster constituencies, the ceremonial county of Somerset is divided into 11 parliamentary constituencies, each returning one Member of Parliament (MP) to the House of Commons.

Conservative Labour Liberal Democrat

Constituency	Member of Parliament
Bath	Wera Hobhouse
Bridgwater	Ashley Fox
Frome and East Somerset	Anna Sabine
Glastonbury and Somerton	Sarah Dyke
North East Somerset and Hanham (partly in Gloucestershire)	Dan Norris
North Somerset	Sadik Al-Hassan
Taunton and Wellington	Gideon Amos
Tiverton and Minehead (partly in Devon)	Rachel Gilmour
Wells and Mendip Hills	Tessa Munt
Weston-super-Mare	Dan Aldridge
Yeovil	Adam Dance

=== European Parliament ===
From 1984 to 1994, Somerset was represented by Conservative Margaret Daly as part of the Somerset and Dorset West constituency for elections to the European Parliament.

From 1994 to 1999, Somerset was represented by Liberal Democrat Graham Watson as part of the Somerset and North Devon constituency for elections to the European Parliament.

From 1999 to 2020, Somerset was part of the South West England constituency for elections to the European Parliament.

=== Civil parishes ===
Almost all of the county is covered by the lowest/most local form of English local government, the civil parish, with either a town or parish council (a city council in the instance of Wells) or a parish meeting; some parishes group together, with a single council or meeting for the group. The city of Bath (the area of the former county borough) and much of the town of Taunton are unparished areas.

== Economy ==
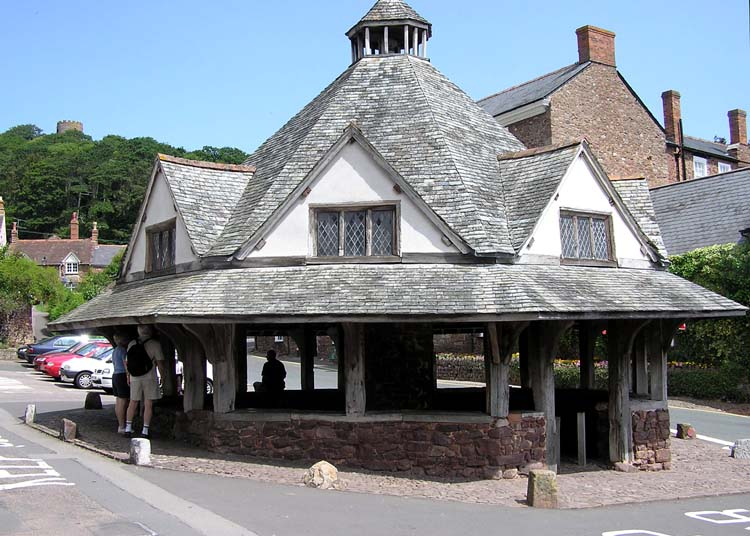
The Dunster Yarn Market was built in 1609 for the trading of local cloth.

Somerset has few industrial centres, but it does have a variety of light industry and high technology businesses, along with traditional agriculture and an increasingly important tourism sector, resulting in an unemployment rate of 2.5%. Tourism was estimated in 2013 to support around 26,000 people.

Bridgwater was developed during the Industrial Revolution as the area's leading port. The River Parrett was navigable by large ships as far as Bridgwater. Cargoes were then loaded onto smaller boats at Langport Quay, next to the Bridgwater Bridge, to be carried further upriver to Langport; or they could turn off at Burrowbridge and then travel via the River Tone to Taunton. The Parrett is now only navigable as far as Dunball Wharf. Bridgwater, in the 19th and 20th centuries, was a centre for the manufacture of bricks and clay roof tiles, and later cellophane, but those industries have now stopped.

With its good links to the motorway system, Bridgwater has developed as a distribution hub for companies such as Argos, Toolstation, Morrisons and Gerber Juice. Leonardo Helicopters, formerly AgustaWestland, manufactures helicopters in Yeovil, and Normalair Garratt, builder of aircraft oxygen systems, is also based in the town.

Somerset is an important supplier of defence equipment and technology. A Royal Ordnance Factory, ROF Bridgwater was built at the start of the Second World War, between the villages of Puriton and Woolavington, to manufacture explosives. The site was decommissioned and closed in July 2008. Templecombe has Thales Underwater Systems, and Taunton presently has the United Kingdom Hydrographic Office and Avimo, which became part of Thales Optics. It was announced twice, in 2006 and 2007, that manufacturing is to end at Thales Optics' Taunton site, but the trade unions and Taunton Deane District Council are working to reverse or mitigate these decisions. Other high-technology companies include the optics company Gooch and Housego at Ilminster. There are Ministry of Defence offices in Bath, and Norton Fitzwarren is the home of 40 Commando Royal Marines. The Royal Naval Air Station in Yeovilton, is one of Britain's two active Fleet Air Arm bases and is home to the Royal Navy's AgustaWestland AW159 Wildcat helicopters and the Royal Marines Commando AgustaWestland AW101 Merlins.

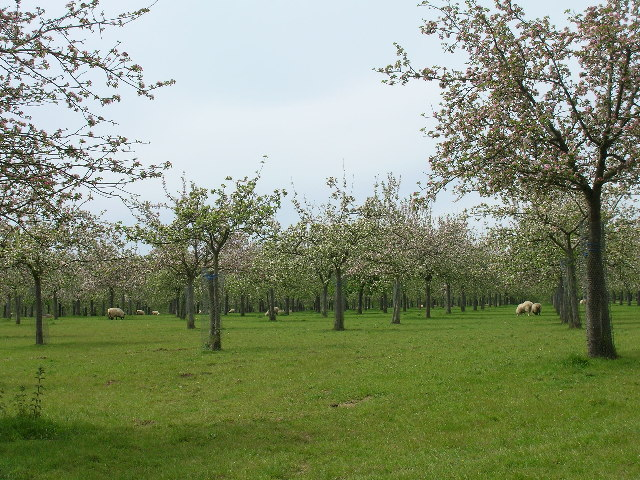
A traditional cider apple orchard at Over Stratton, with sheep grazing

Agriculture and food and drink production continue to be major industries in the county, employing over 15,000 people. Apple orchards were once plentiful, and Somerset is still a major producer of cider. The towns of Taunton and Shepton Mallet are involved with the production of cider, especially Blackthorn Cider, which is sold nationwide, and there are specialist producers such as Burrow Hill Cider Farm and Thatchers Cider. Gerber Products Company in Bridgwater is the largest producer of fruit juices in Europe, producing brands such as Sunny Delight and Ocean Spray. Development of the milk-based industries, such as Ilchester Cheese Company and Yeo Valley Organic, have resulted in the production of a range of desserts, yoghurts and cheeses.

Traditional willow growing and weaving (such as basket weaving) is not as extensive as it used to be but is still carried out on the Somerset Levels and is commemorated at the Willows and Wetlands Visitor Centre. Fragments of willow basket were found near the Glastonbury Lake Village, and it was also used in the construction of several Iron Age causeways. The willow was harvested using a traditional method of pollarding, where a tree would be cut back to the main stem. During the 1930s, more than 3,600 hectares (8,900 acres) of willow were being grown commercially on the Levels. Largely due to the displacement of baskets with plastic bags and cardboard boxes, the industry has severely declined since the 1950s. By the end of the 20th century, only about 140 hectares (350 acres) were grown commercially, near the villages of Burrowbridge, Westonzoyland, and North Curry.

Towns such as Castle Cary and Frome grew around the medieval weaving industry. Street developed as a centre for the production of woollen slippers and, later, boots and shoes, with C&J Clark establishing its headquarters in the village. C&J Clark's shoes are no longer manufactured there as the work was transferred to lower-wage areas, such as China and Asia.

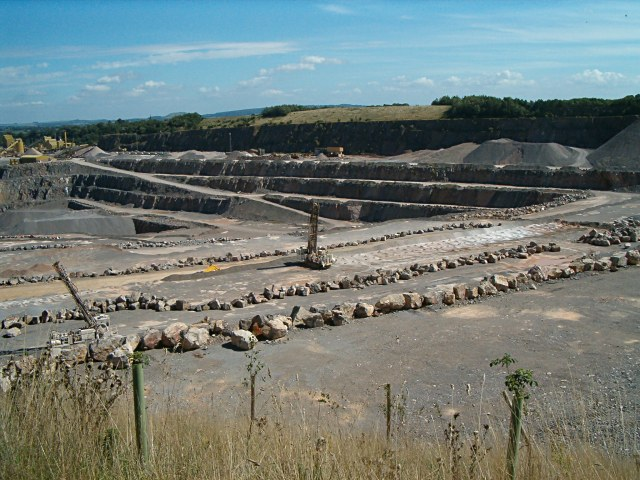
Stone quarries are still a major employer in Somerset

The county has a long tradition of supplying freestone and building stone. Quarries at Doulting supplied freestone used in the construction of Wells Cathedral. Bath stone is also widely used. Ralph Allen promoted its use in the early 18th century, as did Hans Price in the 19th century, but it was used long before then. It was mined underground at Combe Down and Bathampton Down Mines, and as a result of cutting the Box Tunnel, at locations in Wiltshire such as Box. Bath stone is still used on a reduced scale today, but more often as a cladding rather than a structural material. Further south, Hamstone is the colloquial name given to stone from Ham Hill, which is also widely used in the construction industry. Blue Lias has been used locally as a building stone and as a raw material for lime mortar and Portland cement. Until the 1960s, Puriton had Blue Lias stone quarries, as did several other Polden villages. Its quarries also supplied a cement factory at Dunball, adjacent to the King's Sedgemoor Drain. Its derelict, early 20th-century remains were removed when the M5 motorway was constructed in the mid-1970s. Since the 1920s, the county has supplied aggregates. Foster Yeoman is Europe's largest supplier of limestone aggregates, with quarries at Merehead Quarry. It has a dedicated railway operation, Mendip Rail, which is used to transport aggregates by rail from a group of Mendip quarries.

In November 2008, a public sector inward investment organisation was launched, called Into Somerset, with the intention of growing the county's economy by promoting it to businesses that may wish to relocate from other parts of the UK (especially London) and the world. This is now part of the Heart of the South West Growth Hub.

=== Nuclear electricity ===
Hinkley Point C nuclear power station is a project to construct a 3,200 MW two-reactor nuclear power station. On 18 October 2010, the British government announced that Hinkley Point – already the site of the disused Hinkley Point A and (operational at the time) Hinkley Point B power stations – was one of the eight sites it considered suitable for future nuclear power stations. NNB Generation Company, a subsidiary of EDF, submitted an application for development consent to the Infrastructure Planning Commission on 31 October 2011. A protest group, Stop Hinkley, was formed to campaign for the closure of Hinkley Point B and oppose any expansion at the Hinkley Point site. In December 2013, the European Commission opened an investigation to assess whether the project breaks state-aid rules. On 8 October 2014 it was announced that the European Commission has approved the project, with an overwhelming majority and only four commissioners voting against the decision. Construction began in 2017 with an initial completion date of 2025, which has since been extended to 2030.

== Emergency services ==
All of the ceremonial county of Somerset is covered by the Avon and Somerset Police, a police force which also covers Bristol and South Gloucestershire. The police force is governed by the elected Avon and Somerset Police and Crime Commissioner. The Devon and Somerset Fire and Rescue Service covers the area of the Somerset County Council as well as the entire ceremonial county of Devon. The unitary districts of North Somerset and Bath & North East Somerset are instead covered by the Avon Fire and Rescue Service, a service which also covers Bristol and South Gloucestershire. The South Western Ambulance Service covers the entire South West of England, including all of Somerset. The Dorset and Somerset Air Ambulance is a charitable organisation based in the county.

== Culture ==
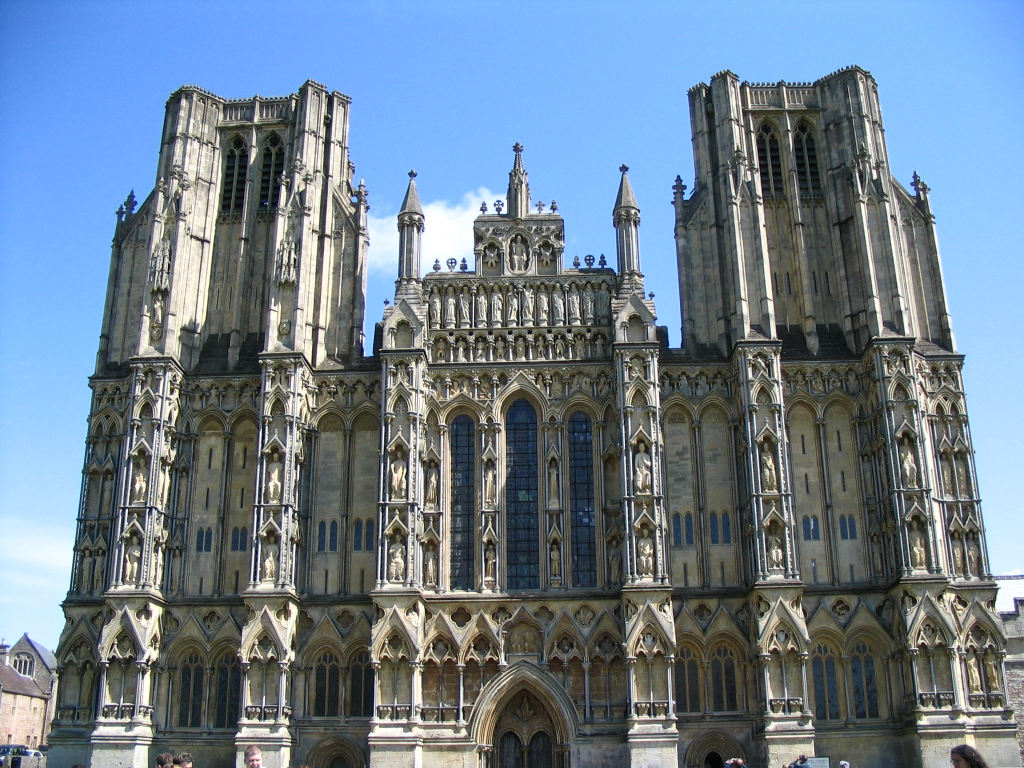
The west front of Wells Cathedral

In Arthurian legend, Avalon became associated with Glastonbury Tor when monks at Glastonbury Abbey claimed to have discovered the bones of King Arthur and his queen. What is more certain is that Glastonbury was an important religious centre by 700 and claims to be "the oldest above-ground Christian church in the World" situated "in the mystical land of Avalon". The claim is based on dating the founding of the community of monks at AD 63, the year of the legendary visit of Joseph of Arimathea, who was supposed to have brought the Holy Grail.

During the Middle Ages there were also important religious sites at Woodspring Priory and Muchelney Abbey. The present Diocese of Bath and Wells covers Somerset – with the exception of the Parish of Abbots Leigh with Leigh Woods in North Somerset – and a small area of Dorset. The Episcopal seat of the Bishop of Bath and Wells is now in the Cathedral Church of Saint Andrew in the city of Wells, having previously been at Bath Abbey. Before the English Reformation, it was a Roman Catholic diocese; the county now falls within the Roman Catholic Diocese of Clifton. The Benedictine monastery Saint Gregory's Abbey, commonly known as Downside Abbey, is at Stratton-on-the-Fosse, and the ruins of the former Cistercian Cleeve Abbey are near the village of Washford.

Somerset has traditions of art, music, and literature. Wordsworth and Coleridge wrote while staying in Coleridge Cottage, Nether Stowey. The novelist John Cowper Powys (1872–1963) lived in the Somerset village of Montacute from 1885 until 1894 and his novels Wood and Stone (1915) and A Glastonbury Romance (1932) are set in Somerset. The writer Evelyn Waugh spent his last years in the village of Combe Florey.

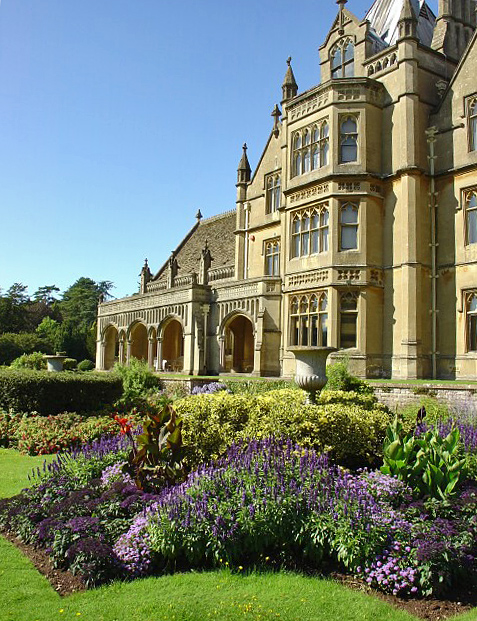
Tyntesfield

Traditional folk music, both song and dance, was important in the agricultural communities. Somerset songs were collected by Cecil Sharp and incorporated into works such as Holst's A Somerset Rhapsody. Halsway Manor near Williton is an international centre for folk music. The tradition continues today with groups such as The Wurzels specialising in Scrumpy and Western music.

The Glastonbury Festival of Contemporary Performing Arts takes place most years in Pilton, near Shepton Mallet, attracting over 170,000 music and culture lovers from around the world to see world-famous entertainers. The Big Green Gathering, which grew out of the Green fields at the Glastonbury Festival, is held in the Mendip Hills between Charterhouse and Compton Martin each summer. The annual Bath Literature Festival is one of several local festivals in the county; others include the Frome Festival and the Trowbridge Village Pump Festival, which, despite its name, is held at Farleigh Hungerford in Somerset. The annual circuit of West Country Carnival is held in a variety of Somerset towns during the autumn, forming a major regional festival, and the largest Festival of Lights in Europe.

The county has several museums; those at Bath include the American Museum in Britain, the Museum of Bath Architecture, the Herschel Museum of Astronomy, the Jane Austen Centre, and the Roman Baths. Other visitor attractions which reflect the cultural heritage of the county include: Claverton Pumping Station, Dunster Working Watermill, the Fleet Air Arm Museum at Yeovilton, Nunney Castle, The Helicopter Museum in Weston-super-Mare, King John's Hunting Lodge in Axbridge, Blake Museum Bridgwater, Radstock Museum, Museum of Somerset in Taunton, the Somerset Rural Life Museum in Glastonbury, and Westonzoyland Pumping Station Museum.

Somerset has 11,500 listed buildings, 523 scheduled monuments, 192 conservation areas, 41 parks and gardens including those at Barrington Court, Holnicote Estate, Prior Park Landscape Garden and Tintinhull Garden, 36 English Heritage sites and 19 National Trust sites, including Clevedon Court, Fyne Court, Montacute House and Tyntesfield as well as Stembridge Tower Mill, the last remaining thatched windmill in England. Other historic houses in the county which have remained in private ownership or used for other purposes include Halswell House and Marston Bigot. A key contribution of Somerset architecture is its medieval church towers. Jenkins writes, "These structures, with their buttresses, bell-opening tracery and crowns, rank with Nottinghamshire alabaster as England's finest contribution to medieval art."

The flag designed to represent the historic county of Somerset in 2013

Bath Rugby play at the Recreation Ground in Bath, and the Somerset County Cricket Club are based at the County Ground in Taunton. The county's highest-ranked football club is Yeovil Town, currently playing in the National League. Horse racing courses are at Taunton, Bath and Wincanton.

The county is served by the regional Western Daily Press and local newspapers including the Weston & Somerset Mercury, the Bath Chronicle, Chew Valley Gazette, Somerset County Gazette, Clevedon Mercury Mendip Times, and the West Somerset Free Press. Television is provided by BBC West and ITV West Country, while southwestern parts of the county can receive BBC South West. Local radio stations are BBC Radio Somerset, BBC Radio Bristol (in northern parts of the county), Heart West, and Greatest Hits Radio South West in Yeovil.

A flag representing the historic county of Somerset was registered with the Flag Institute following a competition in July 2013.

== Transport ==
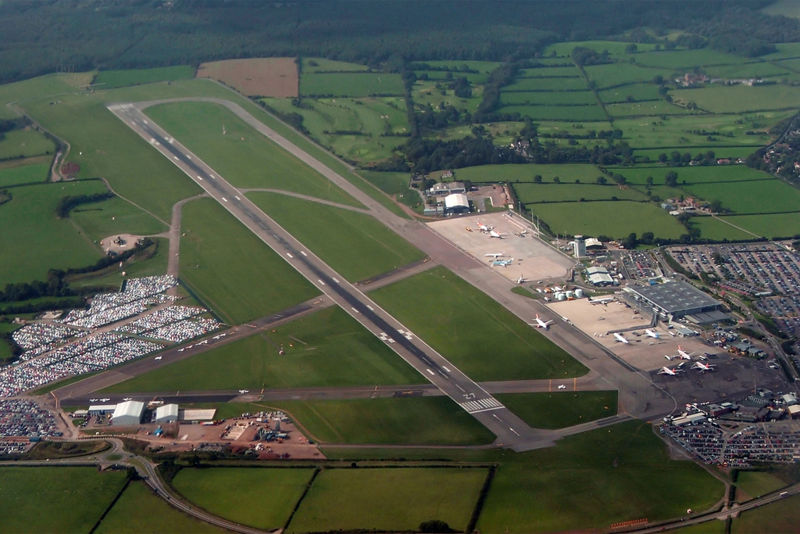
Bristol Airport, which is located in North Somerset

Somerset has 6,531 km (4,058 mi) of roads. The main arterial routes, which include the M5 motorway, A303, A37, A38, A39, A358 and A361 give good access across the county, but many areas can only be accessed via narrow country lanes.

Rail services are provided by the West of England Main Line through Yeovil Junction, the Bristol to Exeter line, Heart of Wessex line which runs from Bristol Temple Meads to Weymouth and the Reading to Taunton line. The main train operator in Somerset is Great Western Railway, with other services operated by South Western Railway and CrossCountry.

Bristol Airport, located in North Somerset, provides national and international air services.

The Somerset Coal Canal was built in the early 19th century to reduce the cost of transportation of coal and other heavy produce. The first 16 kilometres (10 mi), running from a junction with the Kennet & Avon Canal, along the Cam valley, to a terminal basin at Paulton, were in use by 1805, together with several tramways. A planned 11.7 km (7.3 mi) branch to Midford was never built, but in 1815 a tramway was laid along its towing path. In 1871 the tramway was purchased by the Somerset & Dorset Joint Railway (S&DJR), and operated until the 1950s.

The 19th century saw improvements to Somerset's roads with the introduction of turnpikes, and the building of canals and railways. Nineteenth-century canals included the Bridgwater & Taunton Canal, Westport Canal, Glastonbury Canal and Chard Canal. The Dorset & Somerset Canal was proposed, but little of it was ever constructed and it was abandoned in 1803.

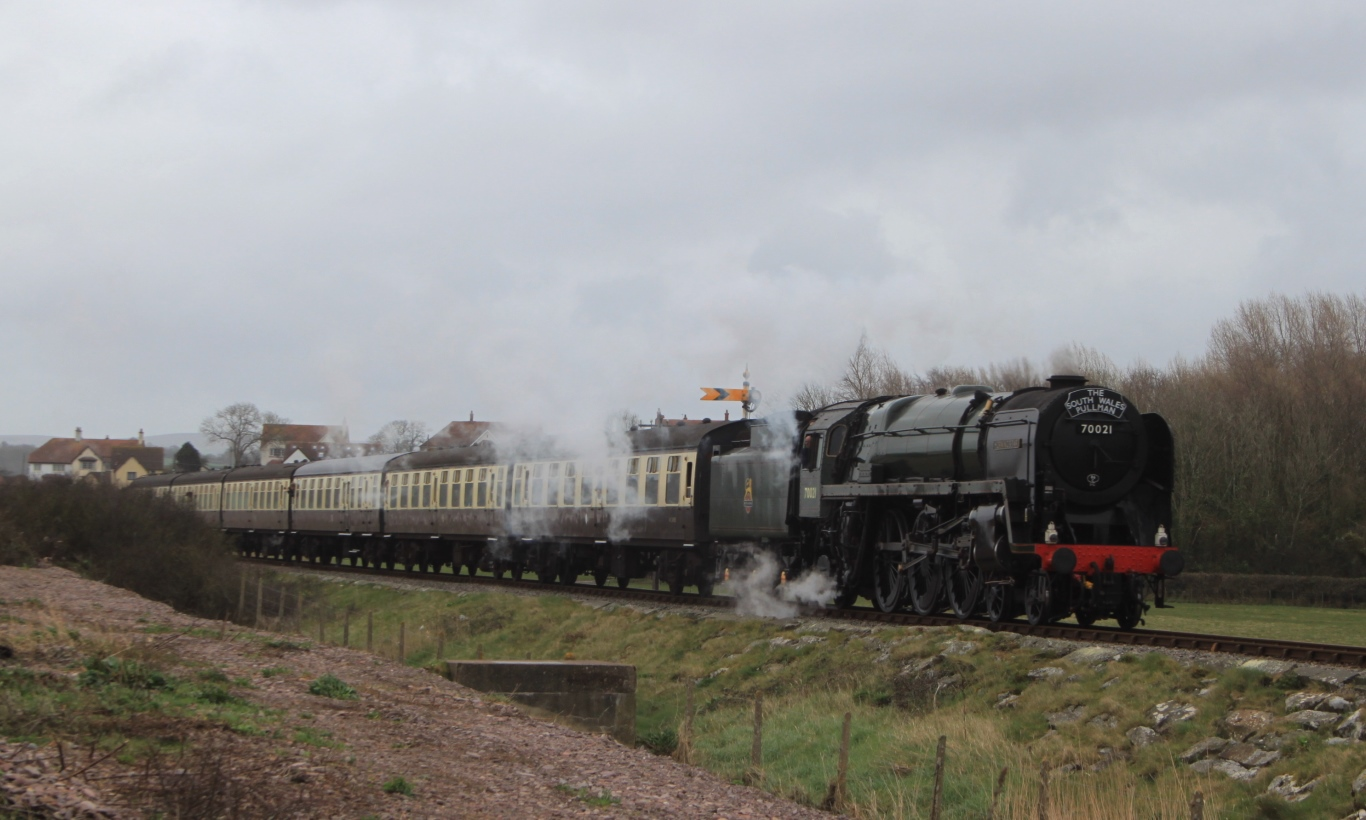
A steam locomotive and carriages, on the West Somerset Railway, a heritage line of notable length, in spring 2015

The usefulness of the canals was short-lived, though some have now been restored for recreation. The 19th century also saw the construction of railways to and through Somerset. The county was served by five pre-1923 Grouping railway companies: the Great Western Railway (GWR); a branch of the Midland Railway (MR) to Bath Green Park (and another one to Bristol); the S&DJR, and the London & South Western Railway (L&SWR).

The former main lines of the GWR are still in use today, although many of its branch lines were scrapped as part of the Beeching cuts. The former lines of the S&DJR closed completely, as has the branch of the Midland Railway to Bath Green Park (and to Bristol St Philips). The L&SWR survived as a part of the present West of England Main Line. None of these lines, in Somerset, is electrified. Two branch lines, the West and East Somerset Railway, were rescued and transferred back to private ownership as "heritage" lines. The fifth railway was a short-lived light railway, the Weston, Clevedon & Portishead Light Railway. The West Somerset Mineral Railway carried the iron ore from the Brendon Hills to Watchet.

Until the 1960s the piers at Weston-super-Mare, Clevedon, Portishead and Minehead were served by the paddle steamers of P & A Campbell who ran regular services to Barry and Cardiff as well as Ilfracombe and Lundy Island. The original stone pier at Burnham-on-Sea was used for commercial goods; one of the reasons for the S&DJR was to provide a link between the Bristol Channel and the English Channel. The newer concrete pier at Burnham-on-Sea is claimed to be the shortest pier in Britain. In the 1970s the Royal Portbury Dock was constructed to provide extra capacity for the Port of Bristol.

For long-distance holiday traffic travelling through the county to and from Devon and Cornwall, Somerset is often regarded as a marker on the journey. North–south traffic moves through the county via the M5 motorway. Traffic to and from the east travels either via the A303 road, or the M4 motorway, which runs east–west, crossing the M5 motorway just beyond the northern limits of the county.

== Education ==
State schools in Somerset are provided by three local education authorities: Bath and North East Somerset, North Somerset, and the larger Somerset County Council. All state schools are comprehensive. In some areas, primary, infant and junior schools cater for ages four to eleven, after which the pupils move on to secondary schools. There is a three-tier system of first, middle and upper schools in the Cheddar Valley, and in West Somerset, while most other schools in the county use the two-tier system. Somerset has 30 state and 17 independent secondary schools; Bath and North East Somerset has 13 state and 5 independent secondary schools; and North Somerset has 10 state and 2 independent secondary schools, excluding sixth form colleges.

% of pupils gaining 5 grades A-C including English and Maths in 2006 (average for England is 45.8%)
Education authority	%
Bath and North East Somerset (Unitary Authority)	52.0%
West Somerset	51.0%
Taunton Deane	49.5%
Mendip	47.7%
North Somerset (Unitary Authority)	47.4%
South Somerset	42.3%
Sedgemoor	41.4%

Some of the county's secondary schools have specialist school status. Some schools have sixth forms, and others transfer their sixth formers to colleges. Several schools can trace their origins back many years, such as The Blue School in Wells and Richard Huish College in Taunton. Others have changed their names over the years such as Beechen Cliff School which was started in 1905 as the City of Bath Boys' School and changed to its present name in 1972 when the grammar school was amalgamated with a local secondary modern school, to form a comprehensive school. Many others were established and built since the Second World War. In 2006, 5,900 pupils in Somerset sat GCSE examinations, with 44.5% achieving 5 grades A-C, including English and Maths (compared to 45.8% for England).

Sexey's School is a state boarding school in Bruton that also takes day pupils from the surrounding area. The Somerset LEA also provides special schools such as Newbury Manor School, which caters for children aged between 10 and 17 with special educational needs. Provision for pupils with special educational needs is also made by the mainstream schools.

There is also a range of private or public schools. Many of these are for pupils between 11 and 18 years, such as King's College, Taunton, Wellington School, Somerset, and Taunton School. King's School, Bruton was founded in 1519 and received royal foundation status around 30 years later in the reign of Edward VI. Millfield is the largest co-educational boarding school. There are also preparatory schools for younger children, such as All Hallows, and Hazlegrove Preparatory School. Chilton Cantelo School offers places both to day pupils and boarders aged 7 to 16. Other schools provide education for children from the age of 3 or 4 years through to 18, such as King Edward's School, Bath, Queen's College, Taunton, and Wells Cathedral School, which is one of the five established musical schools for school-age children in Britain.

Some of these schools have religious affiliations, such as Monkton Combe School, Prior Park College, Sidcot School which is associated with the Religious Society of Friends, Downside School which is a Roman Catholic public school in Stratton-on-the-Fosse, situated next to the Benedictine Downside Abbey, and Kingswood School, which was founded by John Wesley in 1748 in Kingswood near Bristol, originally for the education of the sons of the itinerant ministers (clergy) of the Methodist Church.

=== Further and higher education ===
A wide range of adult education and further education courses is available in Somerset, in schools, colleges, and other community venues. The colleges include Weston College, Bridgwater and Taunton College (formed in 2016 when Bridgwater College and Somerset College of Arts and Technology merged, and includes the Taunton-based University Centre Somerset), Bath College, Frome Community College, Richard Huish College, Strode College and Yeovil College. Somerset County Council operates Dillington House, a residential adult education college located in Ilminster.

The University of Bath, Bath Spa University, and University Centre Weston are higher education establishments in the north of the county. The University of Bath gained its Royal Charter in 1966, although its origins go back to the Bristol Trade School (founded 1856) and Bath School of Pharmacy (founded 1907). It has a purpose-built campus at Claverton on the outskirts of Bath, and has 15,000 students. Bath Spa University, which is based at Newton St Loe, achieved university status in 2005, and has origins including the Bath Academy of Art (founded 1898), Bath Teacher Training College, and the Bath College of Higher Education. It has several campuses and 5,500 students.

== See also ==
- Grade I listed buildings in Somerset
- Healthcare in Somerset
- List of English and Welsh endowed schools (19th century)#Somerset
- List of High Sheriffs of Somerset
- List of hills of Somerset
- List of tourist attractions in Somerset
- Lord Lieutenant of Somerset
- Outline of England
- West Country English
