= Elizabeth Waldegrave, Countess Waldegrave =

British noblewoman, courtier and society beauty

The Right Honourable The Dowager Countess Waldegrave
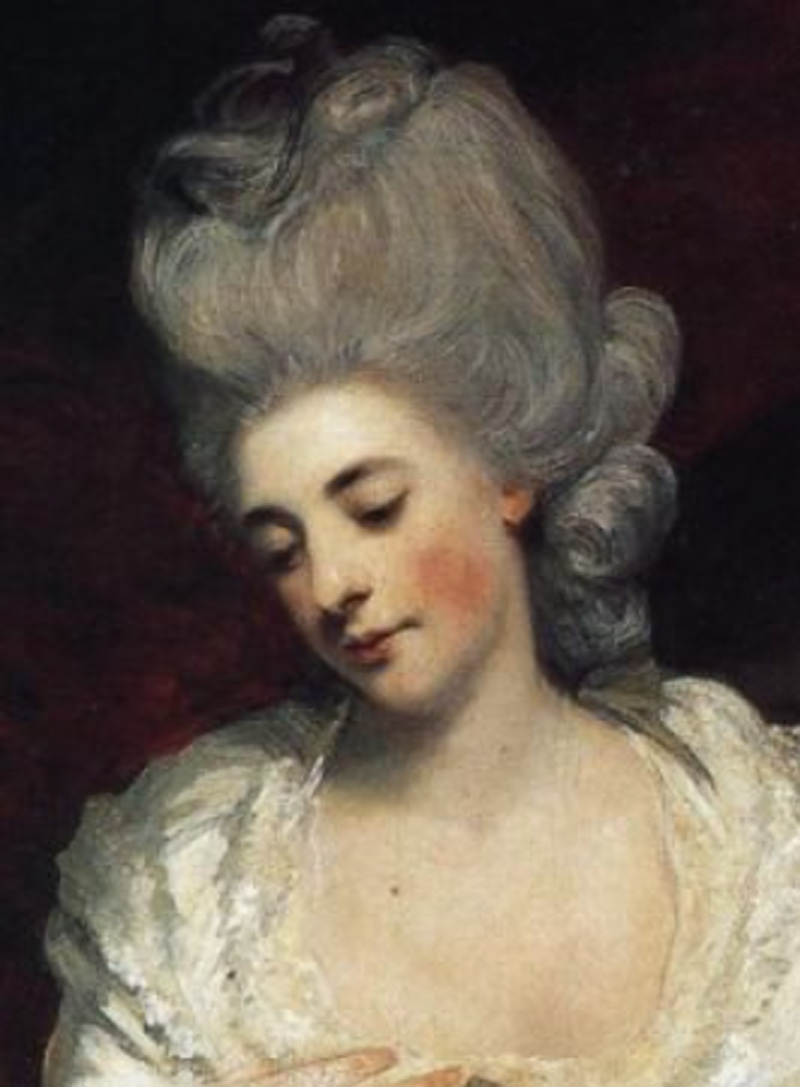
- Lady Elizabeth in 1780 by Joshua Reynolds
- Born: 25 March 1760
- Died: 29 January 1816 (aged 55); Strawberry Hill House, Twickenham
- Spouse: George Waldegrave, 4th Earl Waldegrave (m. 1782; died 1789)
- Children: Lady Maria Micklethwaite; George Waldegrave, 5th Earl Waldegrave; John Waldegrave, 6th Earl Waldegrave; Hon. Edward William Waldegrave; William Waldegrave, 8th Earl Waldegrave
- Parents: James Waldegrave, 2nd Earl Waldegrave; Maria Walpole

Elizabeth Laura Waldegrave, Dowager Countess Waldegrave (25 March 1760 – 29 January 1816), was a British noblewoman, courtier and society beauty. She served at court as a Lady of the Bedchamber to Charlotte, Princess Royal, eldest daughter of King George III. She married her cousin, George Waldegrave, 4th Earl Waldegrave, in 1782.

== Family ==
Lady Elizabeth Laura was born on 25 March 1760, the eldest daughter of statesman James Waldegrave, 2nd Earl Waldegrave, and Maria Walpole, the illegitimate child of Sir Edward Walpole by his mistress, Dorothy Clement. She had two younger sisters, Lady Charlotte Maria, later wife of the 4th Duke of Grafton, and Lady Anna Horatia, who would marry Lord Hugh Seymour.

When Elizabeth was three years of age, her father died of smallpox. As he had no sons, the title Earl Waldegrave passed to his brother, John. Elizabeth and her sisters subsequently took up residence with their mother at Ragman's Castle, a house in Twickenham. On 6 September 1766, her mother married secondly, and in secret, Prince William Henry, Duke of Gloucester and Edinburgh, a member of the British royal family as the younger brother of King George III. It was this marriage, made without the King's consent, which had led to the passing of the Royal Marriages Act in 1772. Elizabeth acquired three half-siblings, Princess Sophia, Princess Carolina (1774–1775), and Prince William Frederick by her mother's second marriage to the Royal duke. She and her sisters then lived at Windsor Castle and Sophia Lodge in Clewer, both in Berkshire.

== Countess Waldegrave ==
Lady Elizabeth's mother commissioned Joshua Reynolds to paint The Ladies Waldegrave, a group portrait of Elizabeth and her two full-sisters, in the hopes of attracting suitors for them. Elizabeth's miniature was painted by Samuel Shelley, and John Hoppner did a half-length portrait of her. The year after Reynolds' painting was exhibited at the Royal Academy, Lady Elizabeth married her cousin, George Waldegrave, Viscount Chewton on 5 May 1782 at Gloucester House, Grosvenor Square, Piccadilly, London. She was 22 years old. The Viscount served as a Colonel of the 87th Regiment of Foot. On 22 October 1784, he succeeded as 4th Earl Waldegrave and henceforth she was styled Countess Waldegrave. In the years following her marriage, Elizabeth gave birth to six children:

- Lady Maria Wilhelmina Waldegrave (1783- 20 February 1805), married Nathaniel Micklethwaite, by whom she had a son, Nathaniel Waldegrave John Branthwayt.
- George Waldegrave, 5th Earl Waldegrave (13 July 1784- 29 June 1794), died at the age of nine by drowning in the River Thames.
- Lieutenant-Colonel John Waldegrave, 6th Earl Waldegrave (31 July 1785- 28 September 1846), married Anne King, by whom he had issue.
- Lieutenant Edward William Waldegrave (29 August 1787- 22 January 1809), drowned at sea
- Vice-Admiral William Waldegrave, 8th Earl Waldegrave (27 October 1788- 24 October 1859), married firstly Elizabeth Whitbread, by whom he had issue; secondly Sarah Whitear
- Lady Charlotte Waldegrave (2 December 1789 - 3 January 1790), born posthumously.

== Later life ==
She went to court on an unrecorded date where she served Charlotte, Princess Royal as a Lady of the Bedchamber. When George III was incapacitated by mental illness in 1788 and 1789, she was one of the ladies who remained at the side of Queen Charlotte offering her loyal support. Novelist Frances Burney refers to Elizabeth, Countess Waldegrave in her diary.

Elizabeth became a widow on 22 October 1789, at the age of twenty-nine. Her eldest son, George, succeeded his father as Earl Waldegrave. The boy drowned five years later while swimming in the River Thames near Eton, and the title then passed to his younger brother, John. Elizabeth lost another son, Edward, when he was drowned in a shipwreck off the coast of Falmouth as he was sailing home from Spain in 1809. He had served as a lieutenant in the 7th Regiment Dragoons.

She died at the Gothic villa of Strawberry Hill in Twickenham (which had been inherited by her son the 6th Earl in 1797), on 29 January 1816 at the age of 55 and was buried beside her husband in Great Packington.

== Ancestry ==
Ancestors of Elizabeth Waldegrave, Countess Waldegrave

Sir Charles Waldegrave, 3rd Baronet
Sir Henry Waldegrave, 1st Baron Waldegrave
Helen Englefield
James Waldegrave, 1st Earl Waldegrave
King James II of England
Henrietta FitzJames
Arabella Churchill
Sir James Waldegrave, 2nd Earl Waldegrave
Sir John Webb, 2nd Baronet
Sir John Webb, 3rd Baronet
Mary Blomer/Bloomer
Mary Webb
John Belasyse, 1st Baron Belasyse
Barbara Belasyse
Lady Anne Paulet
Lady Elizabeth Laura Waldegrave, Countess Waldegrave
Robert Walpole
Sir Robert Walpole, 1st Earl of Orford
Mary Burwell
Sir Edward Walpole
John Shorter
Catherine Shorter
Elizabeth Philipps
Maria Walpole
John Clement
Hammond Clement
Dorothy Clement
Priscilla
