= John Waldegrave, 6th Earl Waldegrave =

British Army officer

The Right Honourable The Earl Waldegrave
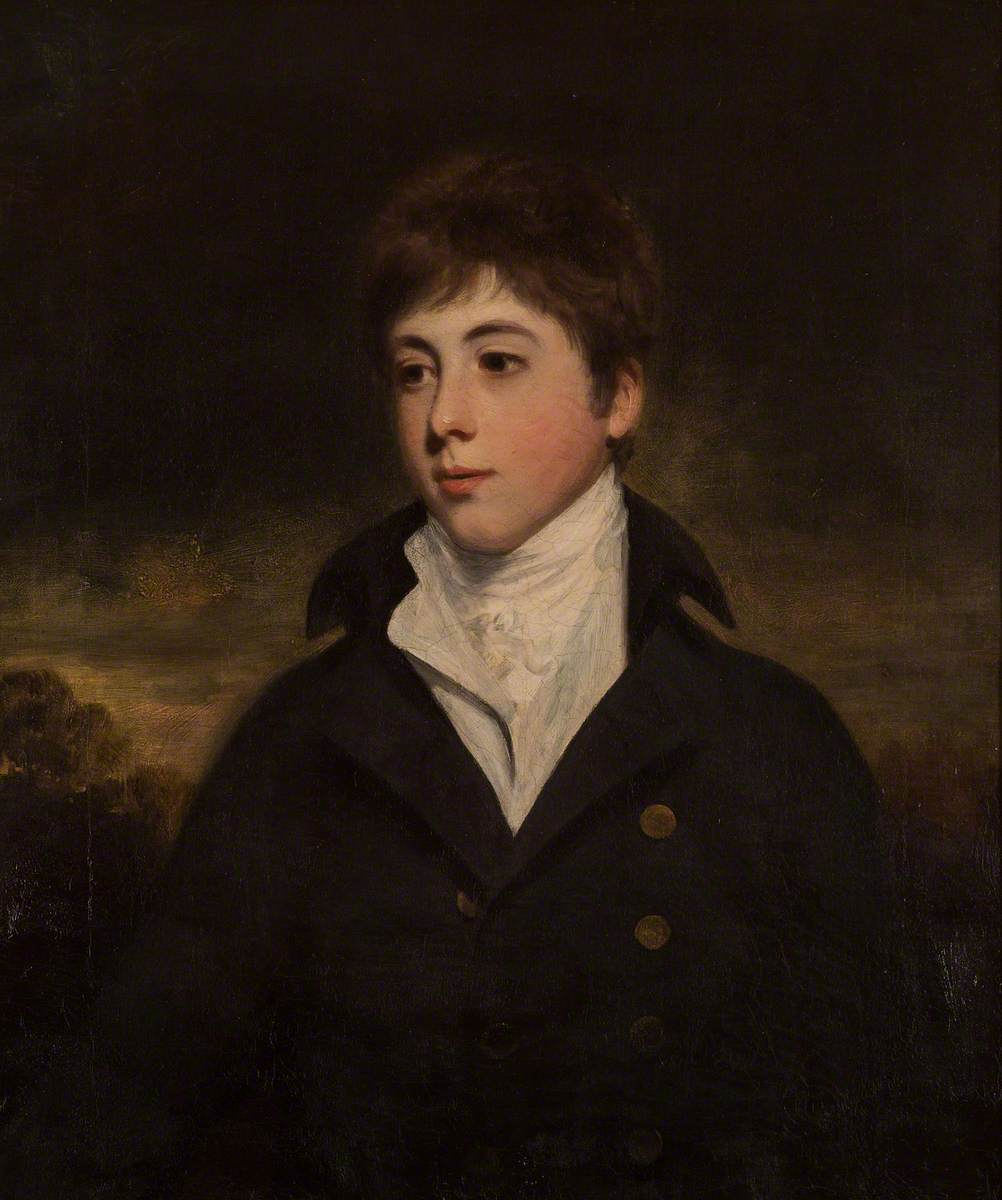
- 1802 portrait of Waldegrave by John Hoppner
- Born: 31 July 1785
- Died: 1835 (aged 49–50)
- Burial place: Navestock
- Military career
- Allegiance: United Kingdom
- Branch: British Army
- Service years: 1802–1835
- Rank: Lieutenant-colonel
- Commands: 54th Regiment of Foot
- Conflicts: Napoleonic Wars; Peninsular War; Battle of Venta del Pozo; Hundred Days

Lieutenant-colonel John James Waldegrave, 6th Earl Waldegrave (31 July 1785 – 1835) was a British Army officer.

Waldegrave was the second son of the 4th Earl Waldegrave and was educated at Eton. Upon his father's death in 1789, Waldegrave's elder brother George inherited the former's titles, but Waldegrave soon inherited them (aged eight), when his brother drowned in the Thames five years later. In 1797 he inherited from Horace Walpole his famous residence, Strawberry Hill House, in Twickenham.

On leaving Eton in 1801, Lord Waldegrave purchased a commission in the 55th Foot. He later transferred to the 3rd Foot Guards and in 1804 transferred to the 39th Foot as a Lieutenant without purchase. He later transferred to the 36th Foot and exchanged into the 7th Light Dragoons in 1805. He saw action during the Peninsular War. In 1808 he transferred to the 8th Garrison Battalion as a Major and a few months later exchanged into the 72nd Foot. He exchanged into the 15th Light Dragoons in 1809 and into the 12th Light Dragoons in 1812. Eight months later he purchased the Lieutenant-Colonelcy of the 54th Foot, which he commanded during the Hundred Days campaign.

On his return home, he married his longtime lover, Anne King on 30 October 1815; they had had several children before their marriage and later had a further four. His daughter Lady Horatia married firstly in 1847 Capt. John Joseph II Webbe-Weston (died 1849) of Sutton Place, Surrey and secondly John Wardlaw, brother of General Wardlaw. Lord Waldegrave was briefly a Tory Lord of the Bedchamber from 1830 to 1831 and died in 1835. He was succeeded by his eldest legitimate son, Hon. George Edward, and his wife remarried in 1839, to Dr Algernon Hicks.

Waldegrave later transferred to the 98th Foot.

== Ancestry ==
Ancestors of John Waldegrave, 6th Earl Waldegrave

Henry Waldegrave, 1st Baron Waldegrave
James Waldegrave, 1st Earl Waldegrave
Henrietta FitzJames
John Waldegrave, 3rd Earl Waldegrave
Sir John Webb, 3rd Baronet
Mary Webb
Barbara Belasyse
George Waldegrave, 4th Earl Waldegrave
Sir John Leveson-Gower, 1st Baron Gower
John Leveson-Gower, 1st Earl Gower
Catherine Manners
Lady Elizabeth Leveson-Gower
Evelyn Pierrepont, 1st Duke of Kingston-upon-Hull
Lady Evelyn Pierrepont
Mary Feilding
John James Waldegrave, 6th Earl Waldegrave
Henry Waldegrave, 1st Baron Waldegrave
James Waldegrave, 1st Earl Waldegrave
Henrietta FitzJames
James Waldegrave, 2nd Earl Waldegrave
Sir John Webb, 3rd Baronet
Mary Webb
Barbara Belasyse
Elizabeth Laura Waldegrave, Countess Waldegrave
Sir Robert Walpole
Sir Edward Walpole
Catherine Shorter
Maria Walpole
Hammond Clement
Dorothy Clement
Priscilla

Peerage of Great Britain
| Preceded by George Waldegrave | Earl Waldegrave; 1794–1835 | Succeeded by George Waldegrave |
