= James Waldegrave =

James Waldegrave may refer to:

- James Waldegrave, 1st Earl Waldegrave, British diplomat
- James Waldegrave, 2nd Earl Waldegrave, British politician
- James Waldegrave, 13th Earl Waldegrave, British peer and businessman
