= Robert Denn =

English cricketer

Robert Denn (dates unknown) was an English amateur cricketer who made ten known appearances in important matches from 1787 to 1793. He played twice for Essex, seven times for Hornchurch Cricket Club and once for a team organised by Richard Newman which played at Navestock Side in Essex.

== Bibliography ==
- Haygarth, Arthur (1996) [1862]. Scores & Biographies, Volume 1 (1744–1826). Kennington: Frederick Lillywhite. ISBN 978-19-00592-23-9.
- Haygarth, Arthur (1997) [1862]. Scores & Biographies, Volume 2 (1827–1840). Kennington: Frederick Lillywhite. ISBN 978-19-00592-23-9.
