= James Waldegrave, 2nd Earl Waldegrave =

British politician (1715–1763)

The Right Honourable The Earl Waldegrave KG PC FRS
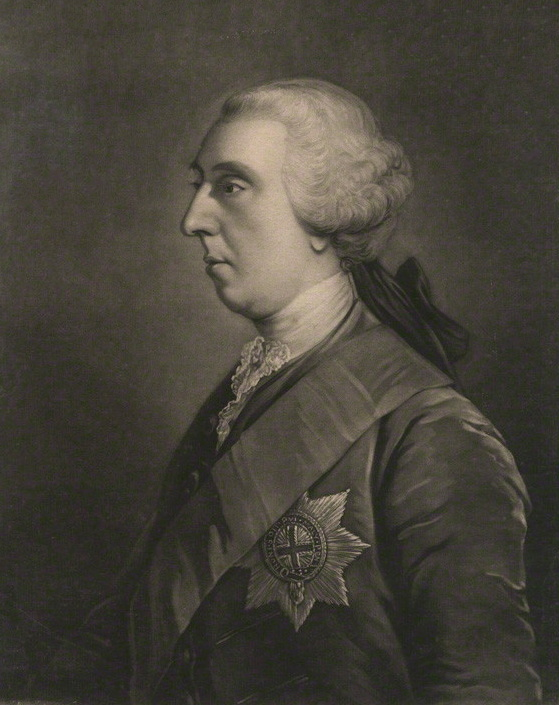
- Engraving, 1762

Prime Minister of Great Britain
- Disputed
- In office 8 June 1757 – 12 June 1757
- Preceded by: The Duke of Devonshire
- Succeeded by: The Duke of Devonshire

Personal details
- Born: 4 March 1715
- Died: 13 April 1763 (aged 48) Albemarle Street, London
- Spouse: Maria Walpole (m. 1759)
- Children: Elizabeth Waldegrave, Countess Waldegrave; Charlotte FitzRoy, Countess of Euston; Anna, Lady Hugh Seymour
- Parent: James Waldegrave, 1st Earl Waldegrave (father)
- Relatives: George Waldegrave, 4th Earl Waldegrave (son-in-law); George FitzRoy, 4th Duke of Grafton (son-in-law); Lord Hugh Seymour (son-in-law)

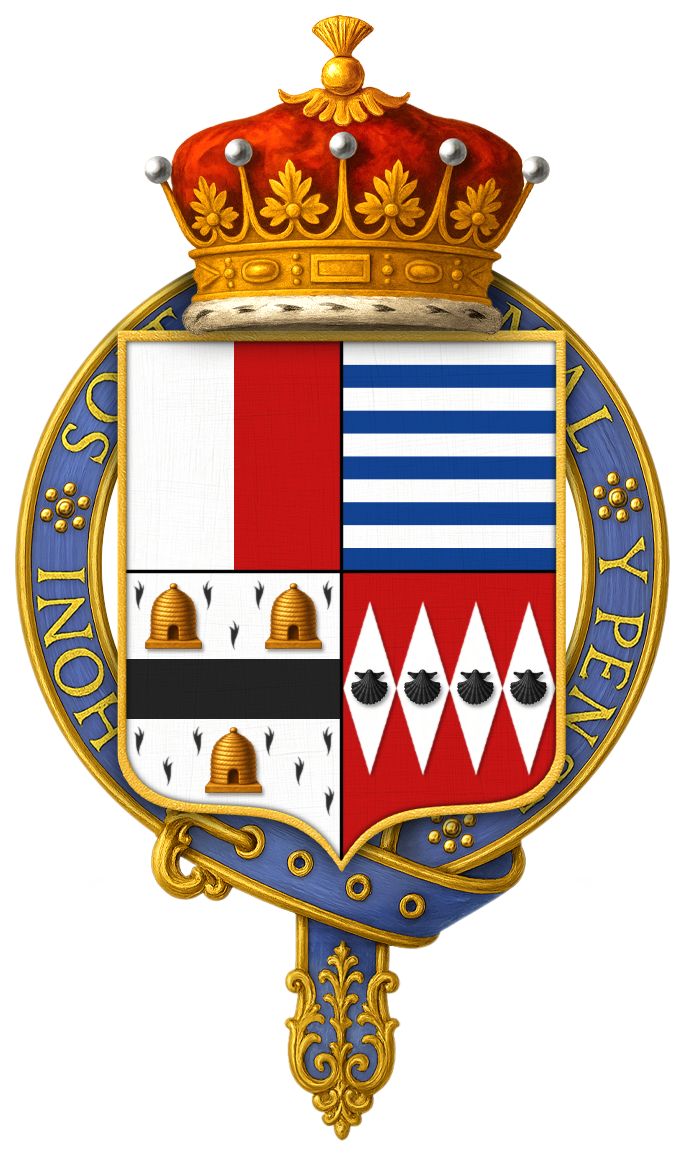
Quartered coat of arms of James Waldegrave, 2nd Earl Waldegrave

James Waldegrave, 2nd Earl Waldegrave, KG, PC, FRS (4 March 1715 – 13 April 1763) was a British politician who is sometimes regarded as one of the shortest-serving prime ministers in British history. His brief tenure as First Lord of the Treasury is lent a more lasting significance by his memoirs, which are regarded as significant in the development of Whig history.

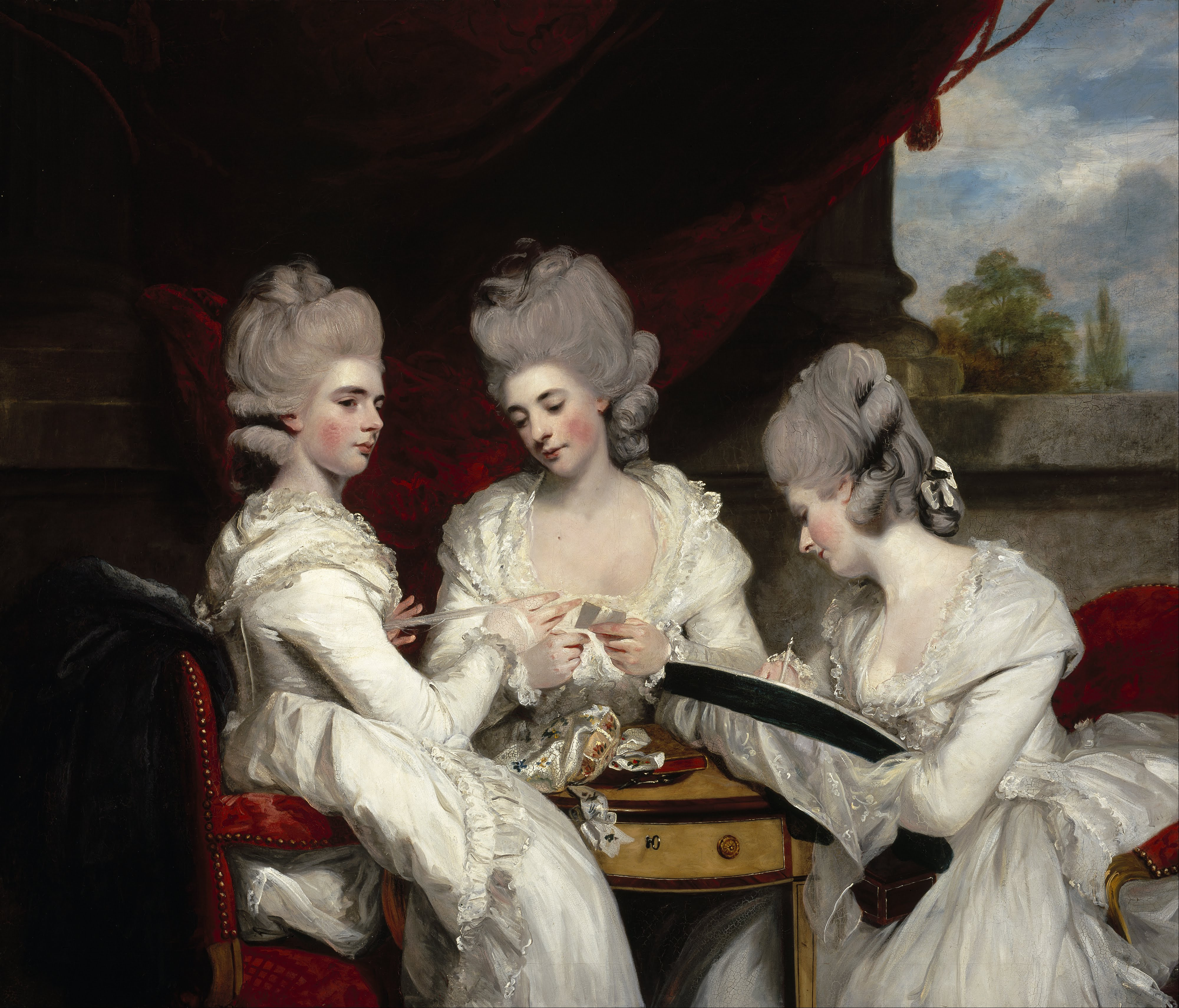
The Ladies Waldegrave, by Joshua Reynolds, 1770–80

Waldegrave served as a governor to The Prince of Wales (the future George III) and Prince Edward from 1752 to 1756. After the resignation of the Duke of Newcastle as prime minister and the dismissal from office of the influential minister William Pitt, George II invited Waldegrave to take over the position of the First Lord of the Treasury. Waldegrave tried to form a government from 8 to 12 June 1757, but failed to do so and stepped down.

Waldegrave retired from public life in 1760, and died of smallpox in 1763. His memoirs were published posthumously in 1821. Through one of his daughters, Waldegrave was an ancestor of Diana, Princess of Wales. His modern descendants include Diana's sons William, Prince of Wales and Prince Harry, Duke of Sussex.

== Early life ==
Waldegrave was born the eldest son of James Waldegrave, 1st Earl Waldegrave, and his wife, Mary Webb, a daughter of Sir John Webb, 3rd Baronet. His paternal grandparents were Henry Waldegrave, 1st Baron Waldegrave and Henrietta FitzJames, the illegitimate daughter of James II of England and his mistress, Arabella Churchill.

Waldegrave was educated at Westminster and Eton, and he inherited his father's titles in 1741.

== Career ==
He was a Gentleman of the Bedchamber from 1743 to 1752, appointed to the Privy Council in 1752 and governor to The Prince of Wales (the future George III) and Prince Edward from 1752 to 1756.

After the resignation of the Duke of Newcastle as prime minister in November 1756, George II dismissed William Pitt (the driving force of the new government) in April 1757 and invited Lord Waldegrave to take over from Newcastle's successor, the Duke of Devonshire, as First Lord of the Treasury. Accordingly, Devonshire was briefly dismissed and Lord Waldegrave tried to form a government from 8 to 12 June that year but failed to do so and stepped down, partly because he feared that as prime minister, he would fall out with his close friend, the King (as his predecessors had done). Devonshire then continued as First Lord and prime minister for almost another two weeks, and Newcastle returned a week later. Waldegrave was made a Knight of the Garter on 30 June. (Note: Lord Waldegrave is not usually counted as Prime Minister, but as he was First Lord of the Treasury he is sometimes regarded as the second-shortest-serving Prime Minister in British history. (See also William Pulteney, 1st Earl of Bath).)

Waldegrave retired from public life upon the accession of George III in 1760.

== Personal life ==
On 15 May 1759, he married Maria Walpole, the illegitimate daughter of Sir Edward Walpole, at Sir Edward's house in Pall Mall by special licence from the archbishop of Canterbury. The ceremony was performed by Frederick Keppel, the future bishop of Exeter, and the official witnesses were Sir Edward and his brother, Horace Walpole. The couple had three daughters:

- Lady Elizabeth Laura Waldegrave (1760–1816), married her cousin, the 4th Earl Waldegrave. Three sons became Earls Waldegrave and all succeeding earls are descended from this marriage.
- Lady Charlotte Maria Waldegrave (1761–1808), married George FitzRoy, 4th Duke of Grafton. All succeeding Dukes of Grafton are descended from this marriage.
- Lady (Anne) Horatia Waldegrave (1762–1801), married Lord Hugh Seymour, son of the 1st Marquess of Hertford. Prior to her marriage, she was perhaps secretly engaged to be married to Robert Bertie, 4th Duke of Ancaster (1756–1779), as she is said by her uncle Horace Walpole and others to have put on mourning for the dissolute young Duke.

He died of smallpox at Albemarle Street, Mayfair, on 13 April 1763 and, lacking male heirs, his titles passed to his younger brother, John.

After his death, his widow Maria married into the British royal family becoming the wife of Prince William Henry, Duke of Gloucester and Edinburgh, King George III's brother. Waldegrave's memoirs were published in 1821.

=== Descendants ===
His daughter, Lady Anne, and her husband were the great-grandparents of Charles Spencer, 6th Earl Spencer, who was the great-grandfather of Diana, Princess of Wales and by her they were the ancestors of The Prince of Wales and The Duke of Sussex.

Political offices
Preceded by Thomas Pitt	Lord Warden of the Stannaries; 1751–1762	Succeeded by Humphry Morice
Preceded by The Lord Walpole	Teller of the Exchequer; 1757–1763	Succeeded by Robert Henley
Preceded by The Duke of Devonshire	First Lord of the Treasury; 8–12 June 1757	Succeeded by The Duke of Devonshire
Peerage of Great Britain
Preceded by James Waldegrave	Earl Waldegrave; 1741–1763	Succeeded by John Waldegrave
