= Navestock =

Civil parish in Essex, England

Coordinates: 51.6518°N 0.2588°E

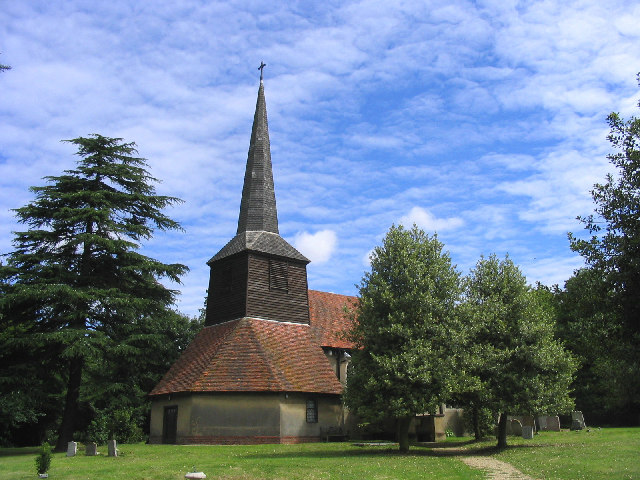
- St Thomas the Apostle Church, Navestock Heath

- Location within Essex
- Interactive map of Navestock
- Area: 18 km^{2} (6.9 sq mi)
- Population: 646 (Parish, 2021)
  - Density: 36/km^{2} (93/sq mi)
- OS grid reference: TQ562972
  - London: 18 mi (29 km) SW
- Civil parish: Navestock
- District: Brentwood
- Shire county: Essex
- Region: East
- Country: England
- Sovereign state: United Kingdom
- Post town: ROMFORD
- Postcode district: RM4
- Post town: BRENTWOOD
- Postcode district: CM14
- Dialling code: 01277
- Police: Essex
- Fire: Essex
- Ambulance: East of England
- UK Parliament: Brentwood and Ongar
- Website: www.navestockparishcouncil.org

Navestock is a civil parish in the Borough of Brentwood in Essex, England. It is located approximately 5 km (3.1 mi) north-west of the town of Brentwood. The main settlements in the parish are Navestock Heath and Navestock Side. The M25 London orbital motorway passes through the west of the parish. At the 2021 census the parish had a population of 646.

The name means ‘the stump on the headland’, which reflects its topography and landscape.

== History ==
The western edge of the parish was within the ancient forest of Essex, and two boundary stones still mark its limits. The church of St Thomas the Apostle dates back to the 12th century, and was subject to St Paul's Cathedral, London, which held the manor of Navestock until the dissolution of the monasteries. After this the manor was in the hands of Sir Brian Tuke and was included when he sold Pyrgo to King Henry VIII in 1544 although Navestock and Stapleford were both subsequently leased to George and Walter Cely, relatives of John Cely who had previously been Paler of the Park of Havering Palace at Havering-atte-Bower.

Sir Edward Waldegrave was lord of the manor of Navestock under Elizabeth I and the Waldegrave family remained the local landowners until the 19th century. There are various Waldegrave memorials in the parish church, including those of James Waldegrave, 1st Earl Waldegrave; the Hon. Edward Waldegrave, son of the 4th Earl, who drowned off Falmouth on his return from the Battle of Corunna in 1809; the 7th Earl Waldegrave and his wife Frances; and Viscount Chewton, son of the 8th Earl, who died from injuries in the Crimean War.

Enclosure of common land, by the 3rd Earl Waldegrave, took place in 1770. Navestock was an early centre for cricket, which has been played on the green at Navestock Side since the 18th century with the earliest recorded match taking place in 1768. The ground was used as the venue for a single first-class match in 1793 between sides organised by Richard Newman and Richard Leigh. Cricket is still played on the green by Navestock Cricket Club.

According to the census of 1801 the population of Navestock was 623, and reached a peak of 982 in 1851. There was then a gradual decline in population during the period of agricultural depression in the late 19th century and the 1901 census recorded only 692 inhabitants. After fluctuating at around that level in the first half of the 20th century the population has declined further and was only 510 in 2001. This makes Navestock unusual in that despite its proximity to London its population is below its level of two hundred years ago, although there are many travelers living on smallholdings in the area who don't register so the number is undoubtedly a lot higher than officially listed.

Historically Navestock was included in the hundred of Ongar. It formed part of the Ongar Rural District Council from 1894 until that authority was absorbed into Epping and Ongar Rural District Council in 1955. Following local government reorganisation in 1974 it has been part of the Borough of Brentwood. The present civil parish retains largely the same boundaries as the ancient parish as it existed prior to the mid-19th century, and forms part of the 'Brizes and Doddinghurst' district council ward.

== Geography ==
Navestock remains a rural and agricultural parish despite being less than 30 km from central London. It is not served well by main roads and so despite being well within the London commuter belt has undergone little recent housing development, and retains a feeling of remoteness. There is no traditional nucleated village in Navestock, but there is a concentration of houses at Navestock Side in the east of the parish and a rather more dispersed one at Navestock Heath in the centre. The medieval church and hall are in an isolated position about a mile further north from Navestock Heath.

The greater part of the parish sits on top of two spurs divided by a stream flowing north into the River Roding, which forms the northern boundary of the parish. The highest point is 103m near Navestock Side in the eastern edge of the parish, while much of the centre and south of the parish forms a plateau generally above 70 metres. The land falls away steeply to the north to the Roding valley, the lowest point being below 30m where the Roding leaves the parish in the far north-west corner.

== Landmarks ==
The country house Abbotswick Hall, now a Catholic retreat centre, is located in the parish.
