= George Waldegrave, 4th Earl Waldegrave =

British Army officer and politician

The Right Honourable The Earl Waldegrave PC
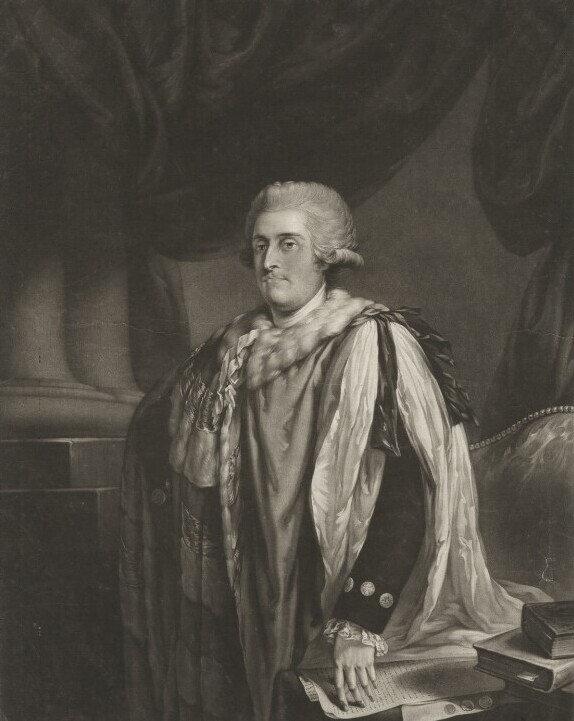
- c. 1784 mezzotint of Waldegrave by Richard Earlom

Member of Parliament for Newcastle-under-Lyme
- In office 1774–1780 Serving with George Hay, Viscount Trentham
- Preceded by: Alexander Forrester; George Hay
- Succeeded by: Viscount Trentham; Sir Archibald Macdonald

Personal details
- Born: George Waldegrave; 23 November 1751
- Died: 22 October 1789 (aged 37)
- Spouse: Lady Elizabeth Waldegrave (m. 1782; died 1789)
- Children: 6
- Parent(s): John Waldegrave, 3rd Earl Waldegrave; Lady Elizabeth Leveson-Gower
- Education: Eton College

Colonel George Waldegrave, 4th Earl Waldegrave, PC (23 November 1751 – 22 October 1789) was a British Army officer and politician who sat in the House of Commons of Great Britain from 1774 to 1780.

== Early life ==
Waldegrave was born on 23 November 1751. He was the eldest son of the John Waldegrave, 3rd Earl Waldegrave and Lady Elizabeth Leveson-Gower, a younger daughter of the 1st Earl Gower.

He was educated at Eton and was commissioned into the 3rd Foot Guards in 1768.

== Career ==
He purchased a Lieutenancy in 1773. On 16 May 1778 he transferred to the Coldstream Guards as a Captain-Lieutenant and on 4 October 1779, was appointed Lieutenant-Colonel of the new 87th Regiment of Foot (until 1783). In 1788 he was briefly made Colonel of the 63rd Regiment of Foot, transferring in 1789 to be Colonel of the 14th Regiment of Foot, a position he held equally briefly before his death later that year.

He inherited his father's titles in 1784.

== Personal life ==
On 5 May 1782, Waldegrave married his first cousin, Lady Elizabeth Waldegrave and they had six children:

- Lady Maria Wilhelmina Waldegrave (1783–1805), who married Nathaniel Micklethwaite. Had issue, a daughter, Charlotte.
- George Waldegrave, 5th Earl Waldegrave (1784–1794), died at the age of nine.
- John Waldegrave, 6th Earl Waldegrave (1785–1846), a Lieutenant-Colonel who married Anne King, by whom he had issue.
- Hon. Edward William Waldegrave (1787–1809), a Lieutenant who drowned at sea.
- William Waldegrave, 8th Earl Waldegrave (1788–1859), a Vice-Admiral who married Elizabeth Whitbread. After her death, he married Sarah Whitear.
- Lady Charlotte Waldegrave (1789–1790), born posthumously but died young.

Lord Waldegrave died on 22 October 1789 and was succeeded in his titles by his son, George who died aged nine in 1794 at which time the titles passed to his younger brother, John.

== Ancestry ==
Ancestors of George Waldegrave, 4th Earl Waldegrave

Sir Charles Waldegrave, 3rd Baronet
Sir Henry Waldegrave, 1st Baron Waldegrave
Helen Englefield
James Waldegrave, 1st Earl Waldegrave
King James II of England
Henrietta FitzJames
Arabella Churchill
John Waldegrave, 3rd Earl Waldegrave
Sir John Webb, 2nd Baronet
Sir John Webb, 3rd Baronet
Mary Blomer/Bloomer
Mary Webb
John Belasyse, 1st Baron Belasyse
Barbara Belasyse
Lady Anne Paulet
George Waldegrave, 4th Earl Waldegrave
Sir William Leveson-Gower, 4th Baronet
Sir John Leveson-Gower, 1st Baron Gower
Lady Jane Granville
John Leveson-Gower, 1st Earl Gower
John Manners, 1st Duke of Rutland
Catherine Manners
Catherine Wriothesley Noel
Lady Elizabeth Leveson-Gower
Robert Pierrepont of Thoresby
Evelyn Pierrepont, 1st Duke of Kingston-upon-Hull
Elizabeth Evelyn
Lady Evelyn Pierrepont
William Feilding, 3rd Earl of Denbigh
Mary Feilding
Mary King

Parliament of Great Britain
Preceded by Alexander Forrester; George Hay	Member of Parliament for Newcastle-under-Lyme; 1774–1780; With: George Hay 1774–1779; Viscount Trentham 1779–1780	Succeeded by Viscount Trentham; Sir Archibald Macdonald
Military offices
New regiment	Colonel of the 87th Regiment of Foot; 1779–1783	Disbandment
Preceded by Alexander Leslie	Colonel of the 63rd (West Suffolk) Regiment of Foot; 1788–1789	Succeeded by The Earl of Crawford
Preceded by John Douglas	Colonel of the 14th (Bedfordshire) Regiment of Foot; 1789	Succeeded by George Hotham
Political offices
Preceded by Viscount Hinchingbrooke	Vice-Chamberlain of the Household; 1782–1784	Succeeded by Lord Herbert
Preceded by The Earl of Waldegrave	Master of the Horse to Queen Charlotte; 1784–1789	Vacant Title next held by The Earl Harcourt
Peerage of Great Britain
Preceded by John Waldegrave	Earl Waldegrave; 1784–1789	Succeeded by George Waldegrave
