= The Ladies Waldegrave =

Painting by Joshua Reynolds

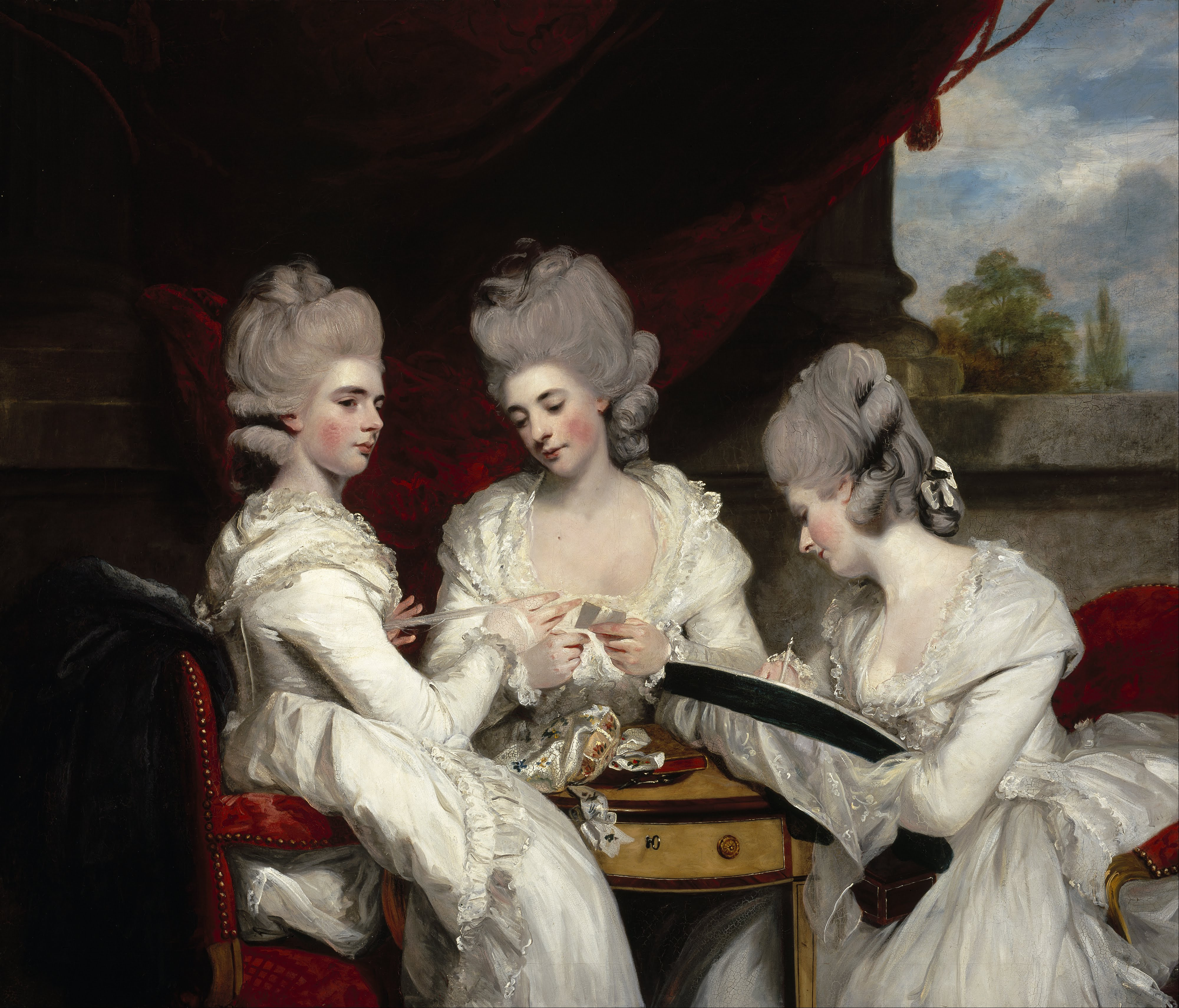
- Artist: Sir Joshua Reynolds
- Year: 1780–1781
- Medium: Oil on canvas
- Dimensions: 143 cm × 168.3 cm (56 in × 66.3 in)
- Location: Scottish National Gallery, Edinburgh

The Ladies Waldegrave is a group portrait by Joshua Reynolds from 1780–81, now in the Scottish National Gallery, who acquired it in 1952. It shows the three daughters of James Waldegrave, 2nd Earl Waldegrave, and Maria Walpole – from left to right, Charlotte (holding a skein of silk), Elizabeth (winding Charlotte's skein onto a card) and Anna (producing tambour lace). Exhibited at the Royal Academy Exhibition of 1781 at Somerset House, it was commissioned the previous year by the subjects' mother in the hope of attracting potential suitors for them – all three of them were at the time unmarried.

== Background ==
The three women depicted in the painting were Elizabeth Laura (b.1760), Charlotte Maria (b. 1761), and Anna Horatia (b.1762). They were the daughters of Maria Walpole from which they were said to have inherited their beauty, and her first husband Lord Waldegrave. Though their father had left dowries totaling 8000 guineas to each of his daughters, it would not have been have an adequate sum to attract aristocratic suitors.

Added to this was their mother's illegitimate birth, and the scandal created by their mother marrying as her second husband William Henry, Duke of Gloucester against the wishes of his brother, George III. The duchess, and by extension her daughters, were therefore banned from attending court. This all combined to create some difficulties to expose the daughters of the Duchess to eligible suitors find a good match.

Their mother had first contrived the idea of showcasing her daughters portrait to suitors by having her two younger daughters Horatia and Maria painted by Ozias Humphrey and this painting showcased at the Royal Axademy's exhibition of 1780.

The resulting painting "Venus and Juno walking on clouds towards Olympus", featured the two ladies Waldegrave "treading on clouds" in the guise of Venus and Juno. The goddesses were respectively goddess of love and of marriage; a suitable pairing to imply the young women's availability for marriage. It was seen as a successful painting by critics, but apparently failed to properly portray the young women's appearances in the eyes of their mother and great-uncle.

Their mother was also not satisfied with the portrait, as she felt it lacked modesty by the fact showed too much of their bodies through the draped cloth (as well as a bare foot) and she therefore declined to buy the painting.

Reynolds was next commissioned to paint all three of the sisters. The first sitting of the sisters for the painting took place in May, 1780 and the second in March 1781. Reynolds found it imperative that an artist work from observing living models in order to capture the true nature of what they were trying to paint. Reynolds did not as a rule make preparatory drawings of his subjects but rather drew inspiration from the many sketches and prints he had amassed while in Rome.

Reynolds employed his theory of balance in the painting's execution with each figure counter-balancing each other.

The background such as the drapery and columns were painted by Reynolds assistants, with Reynolds finishing off the rest of the painting. Reynolds painting technique was that of bravura, which can be seen when comparing the highly finished draperies with the more unfinished drawer on the table and the figures hands.

At the time of the portrait all sisters had suffered marital and romantic disappointments, Elizabeth Laura's match with Francis Osborne, 5th Duke of Leeds had fallen through due to economic reasons, Charlotte Maria, had accepted Lord Egremont but the marriage fell through when he expressed doubts about the marriage; lastly Anna Horatia had been about to be engaged with the Duke of Ancaster until his death from scarlet fever.

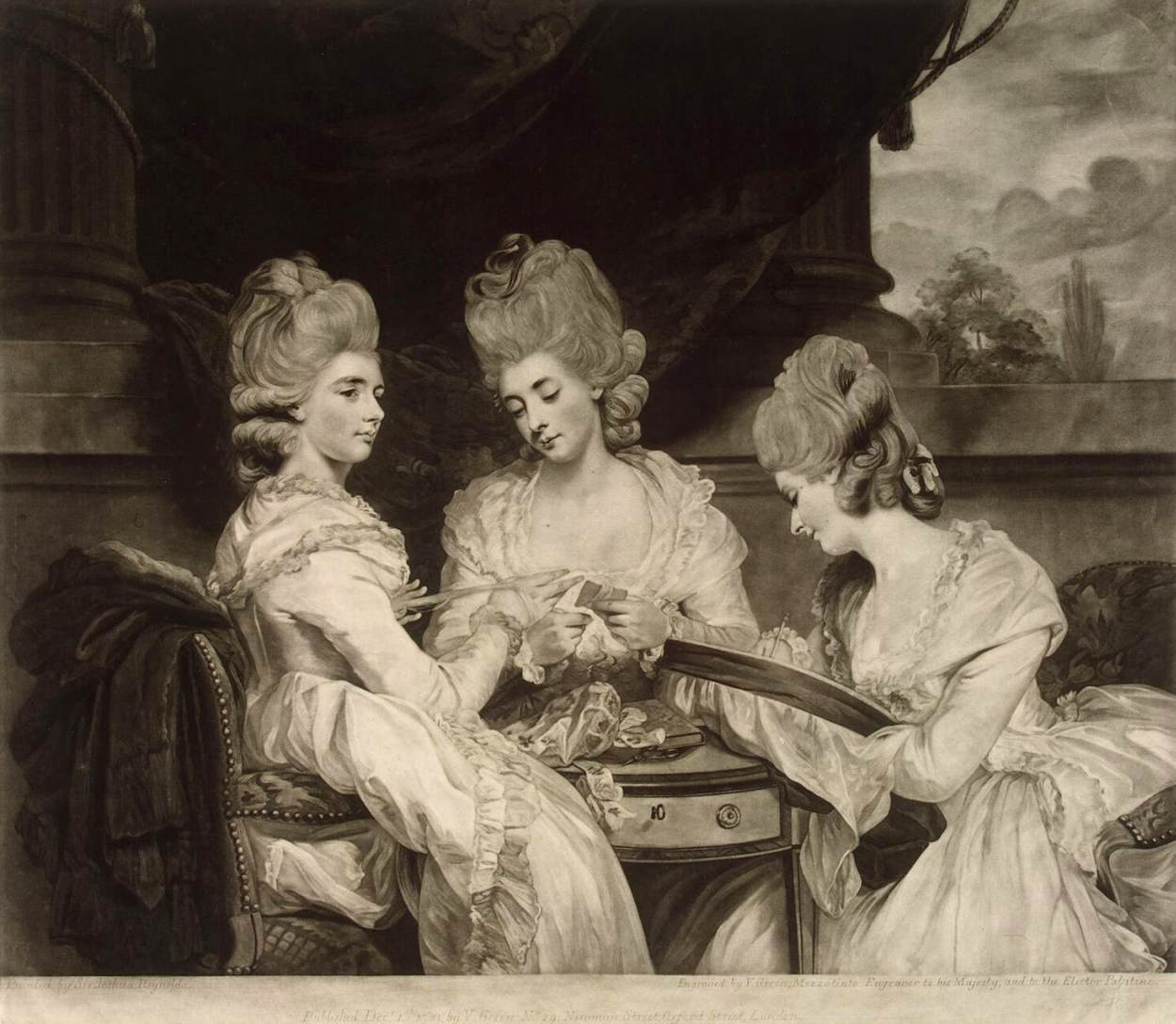
Valentine Green - Portrait of the Ladies Waldegrave

The sisters great-uncle, Horace Walpole who had secured the commission commented that he had wanted his nieces to appear as the three graces adorning their mothers bust with a garland. Reynolds while known for utilizing neo-classical themes had previously painted Three Ladies Adorning a Term of Hymen in 1773 and seems not have wanted to repeat himself. Reynold's had vetoed this idea, this however did not stop people who viewed the painting to note the similarity of the three young women to the graces.

Walpole approved of the painting and paid 300 guineas, although the sisters brought to mind the three fates rather than three graces. He complimented the composition and Reynold's and he admitted that had managed to capture the likeness of the sisters perfectly. Reynolds also appears to have made a second version of this painting "with variations", but this painting was lost and there are no depictions of this artwork.

The Ladies Waldegrave was exhibited at Somerset House as "Portrait of three ladies" between 30 April and 2 June 1781.

It was generally met with positive review and acclaimed as a scene of "domestic elegance". There were some criticisms such "there being too much white drapery" and that the amount of color white did no favours for the sitters appearances.

The engraver Valentine Green made a mezzotint of the painting soon after it´s exhibition at the Royal Academy.

== Description ==
The painting depicts the three sisters in three-quarter length, seated in a composition around a real or cabaret table.

The locked drawer on the table was a common symbolic motif for chastity and virginity. In their white silk polonaise gowns and powdered hair, the sisters epitomizes the height of fashion of the late 18th century. The color white was emblematic of the feminine virtues which is heightened by the activities they are engaged in; Anna Horatia is working at the tambour, while Elizabeth Laura is winding silk skein while the other sister is drawing the thread. The viewers of the painting is therefore meant to infer that the sisters are not only beautiful but also well brought up and accomplished young ladies.

This appearance of modesty is taken to the extreme as none of the sitters are meeting the observers eyes, either looking away, or down, and Horatia is shown in profile, almost turned away in a profil perdu.

== Ownership ==
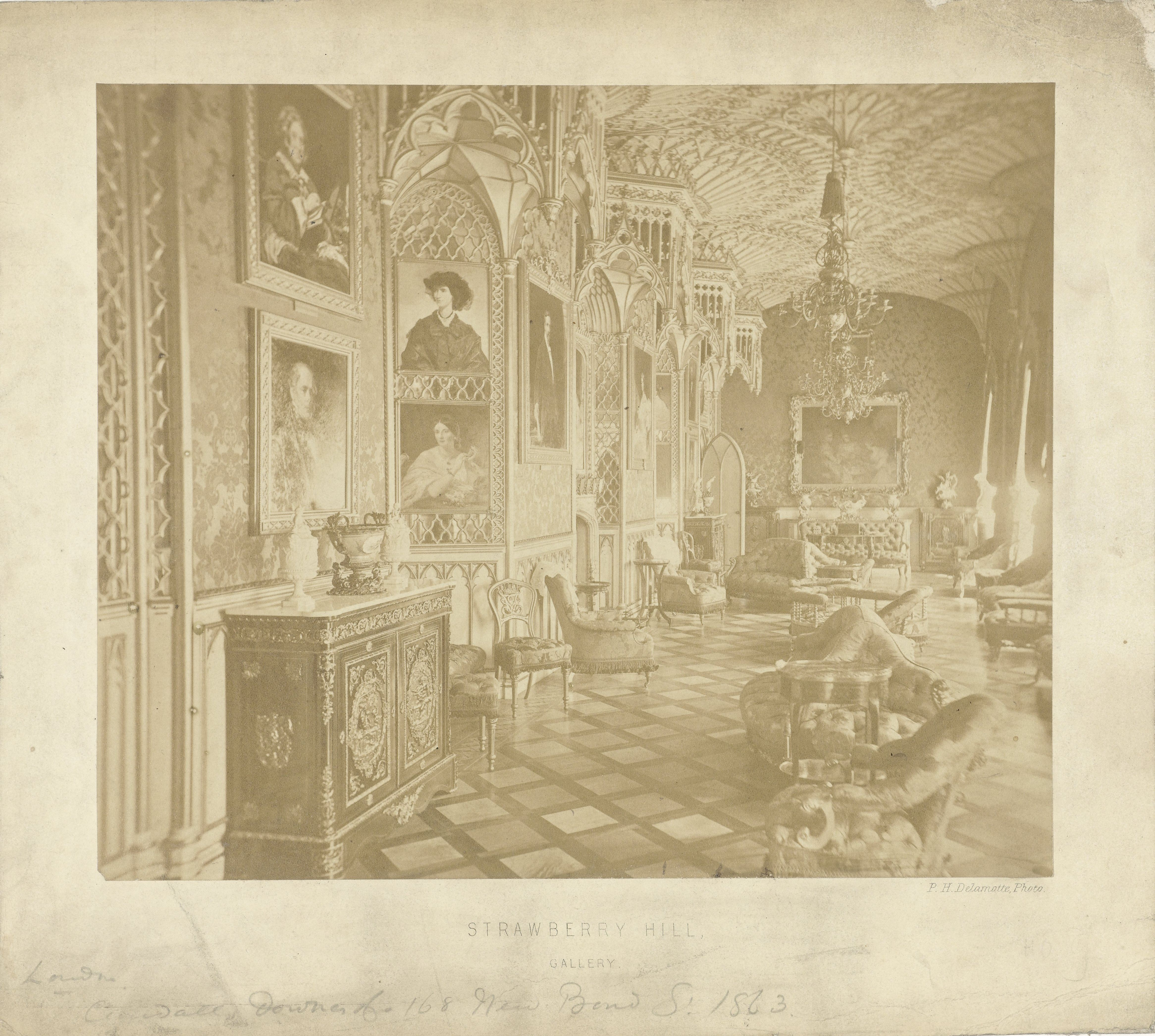
Interior The Gallery , Strawberry Hill House (1868) by Philip Henry Delamotte. The Ladies Waldegrave can be seen on the far wall

The painting formed part of the Strawberry Hill collection and after Walpole's death it was inherited by his second cousin, Anne Seymour Damer, then John Waldegrave (grand-son of Elizabeth Laura) it was then purchased by Earl Waldegrave for 550 guineas.

After his death it was inherited by his widow Frances Waldegrave. She in turn left it to her fourth husband Lord Carlingford, who sold in 1887. It passed to Daniel Thwaites of Blackburn, whose daughter Elma Amy married Robert Armstrong Yerburgh; 1952, November 21, their son Robert Daniel Thwaites Yerbury, 1st Baron Alvingham, sold it to the National Gallery of Scotland with help from National Art Collections Fund (NACF).
