= Countess of Cardigan =

Countess of Cardigan is a title given to the wife of the Earl of Cardigan. The title has been held by a number of women, including:

- Elizabeth Brudenell, Countess of Cardigan (1689–1745)
- Mary Montagu, Countess of Cardigan (c.1711–1775)
- Elizabeth Brudenell, Countess of Cardigan (1758–1823)
- Penelope Brudenell, Countess of Cardigan (1770–1826)
- Adeline, Countess of Cardigan and Lancastre (1824–1915)
