= Elizabeth Brudenell, Countess of Cardigan (1758–1823) =

British noblewoman (1758–1823)

Elizabeth Brudenell, Countess of Cardigan (26 May 1758 – 23 June 1823), formerly Lady Elizabeth Waldegrave, was the second wife of James Brudenell, 5th Earl of Cardigan.

== Early life ==
She was the daughter of John Waldegrave, 3rd Earl Waldegrave, and his wife, the former Lady Elizabeth Leveson-Gower. She was baptised on 22 June 1758 in Kensington. She had two brothers: George, who inherited their father's earldom, and William, an admiral, who was given the title Baron Radstock in the Irish peerage.

== Personal life ==
On 28 April 1791, aged 32, she married the Earl of Cardigan, then aged 76, St. James's Place, London. He had previously been married to the Honourable Anne Legge, daughter of George Legge, Viscount Lewisham, who died in November 1786. There were no children from either his first marriage or his second marriage.

The earl died in February 1811, aged 85, and the barony of Brudenell became extinct. In the absence of a direct heir, the earldom passed to his nephew, Robert Brudenell, 6th Earl of Cardigan.

The Countess of Cardigan died at Seymour Place, Mayfair, London, in June 1823, aged 65. The cause of death was recorded as "inflammation". She was buried at Navestock in Essex.

=== Lady of the Bedchamber ===
From 1793 to 1807, the countess was Lady of the Bedchamber to Charlotte of Mecklenburg-Strelitz, queen consort of King George III of the United Kingdom.
