= Elizabeth Brudenell, Countess of Cardigan =

Elizabeth Brudenell, Countess of Cardigan may refer to:

- Elizabeth Brudenell, Countess of Cardigan (1689–1745)
- Elizabeth Brudenell, Countess of Cardigan (1758–1823)
