= George Hay (politician) =

British judge and politician

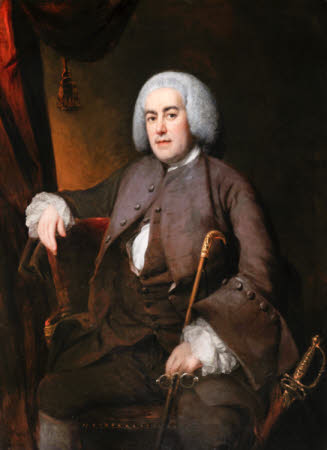
Hay

Sir George Hay (25 January 1715 – 6 October 1778) was a British judge and politician who sat in the House of Commons between 1754 and 1778. He committed suicide.

The son of John Hay, a Church of England clergyman who was Rector of St Stephen's, Coleman Street, London, he was educated at the Merchant Taylors' School and St John's College, Oxford.

He was Chancellor of the Diocese of Worcester 1751–64; King's Advocate General from 1755 to 1764 (with interval in 1756) and Vicar General to the Archbishop of Canterbury for the same period; He was Dean of Arches 1764–1778 and also Judge of the Prerogative Court of Canterbury and Chancellor of the Diocese of Lichfield for the same period. In 1773, the year he was knighted, he was appointed Judge of the High Court of Admiralty.

In 1754, he was returned as Member of Parliament for Stockbridge, but left the House of Commons in 1756 to take up the post of Commissioner of the Admiralty. He returned to Parliament in July 1757 for Calne in Wiltshire, at the request of Pitt the Elder. At the 1761 election, he was returned as MP for Sandwich in Kent, holding that seat until the next election, in 1768, when he stood unsuccessfully for Oxford University. Later that year, through a by-election, he became MP for Newcastle-under-Lyme, holding the seat until his death.

In May 1778, he became ill and was known to be 'lunatic' by August. Arrangements to terminate his legal offices were being made, when in October he escaped from his asylum and drowned himself at the age of 63. He never married.

Parliament of Great Britain
Preceded by Daniel Boone; William Chetwynd	Member of Parliament for Stockbridge; 1754–1756; With: John Gibbons	Succeeded by John Gibbons; The Viscount Powerscourt
Preceded by Thomas Duckett; William Northey	Member of Parliament for Calne; 1757–1761; With: William Northey	Succeeded by Thomas Duckett; Daniel Bull
Preceded by John Clevland; The Viscount Conyngham	Member of Parliament for Sandwich; 1761–1768; With: The Viscount Conyngham	Succeeded by Philip Stephens; The Viscount Conyngham
Preceded by John Wrottesley; Alexander Forrester	Member of Parliament for Newcastle-under-Lyme; 1768–1778; With: Alexander Forrester (1768–1774); George Waldegrave, Viscount Chewton (1774–1778)	Succeeded by George Leveson-Gower, Viscount Trentham; George Waldegrave, Viscount Chewton
