= Alexander Forrester (politician) =

British barrister and politician

Alexander Forrester (c. 1711 – 2 July 1787) was a British barrister and politician.

Forrester's family were Scottish Jacobites who went into exile in France with King James II. However, little is known about his parents.

He was educated at the Inner Temple, and became a successful barrister. After 1758, he specialised in cases before the House of Lords, including election petitions.

Forrester served as a Member of Parliament for several constituencies during his political career:

- Dunwich (1758–1761)
- Okehampton (1761–1768)
- Newcastle-under-Lyme (1768–1774).

Parliament of Great Britain
Preceded by Sir Jacob Downing, Bt; Soame Jenyns	Member of Parliament for Dunwich; 1758–1761; With: Sir Jacob Downing, Bt	Succeeded by Eliab Harvey; Henry Fox
Preceded by George Brydges Rodney; Robert Vyner	Member of Parliament for Okehampton; 1761–1768; With: Wenman Coke	Succeeded by Thomas Pitt; Thomas Brand
Preceded by Sir Lawrence Dundas, Bt; Thomas Gilbert	Member of Parliament for Newcastle-under-Lyme; 1768–1774; With: John Wrottesley 1768; Sir George Hay from 1768	Succeeded by Sir George Hay; Viscount Chewton
