= John Waldegrave, 3rd Earl Waldegrave =

British Army officer and politician (1718–1784)

General The Right Honourable The Earl Waldegrave
- Born: 28 April 1718
- Died: 22 October 1784 (aged 66)
- Spouse: Lady Elizabeth Leveson-Gower
- Children: George Waldegrave, 4th Earl Waldegrave; William Waldegrave, 1st Baron Radstock; Lady Elizabeth Waldegrave; Lady Caroline Waldegrave
- Military career
- Allegiance: United Kingdom
- Branch: British Army
- Rank: General
- Conflicts: War of the Austrian Succession; Seven Years' War

General John Waldegrave, 3rd Earl Waldegrave (28 April 1718 – 22 October 1784) was a British Army officer and politician.

== Career ==
Waldegrave was the youngest son of the 1st Earl Waldegrave. He joined the 1st Regiment of Foot in 1735, rising to the rank of captain in 1739. He became a lieutenant-colonel in the 3rd Regiment of Foot in 1743 and fought in 1745 at the Battle of Fontenoy, where he was wounded, during the War of the Austrian Succession.

He became a member of parliament (MP) for Orford in 1747 and for Newcastle-under-Lyme in 1754. Promoted to major-general in 1757, he took part in the raid on St Malo in June 1758 and the Battle of Minden in August 1759 during the Seven Years' War. He was promoted to lieutenant-general in 1759 and became a Groom of the Bedchamber in 1760. On the death of his elder brother James Waldegrave, 2nd Earl Waldegrave without male heirs in 1763, Waldegrave inherited his titles and estates, including the family seat at Chewton Mendip. He was promoted to full general in 1772 and died in 1784.

== Family ==
On 7 May 1751, he had married Lady Elizabeth Leveson-Gower, a younger daughter of the 1st Earl Gower and they had four children:

- George Waldegrave, 4th Earl Waldegrave (1751–1789)
- William Waldegrave, 1st Baron Radstock (1753–1825)
- Lady Elizabeth Waldegrave (1758–1823)
- Lady Caroline Waldegrave (1765–1831)

== Ancestry ==
Ancestors of John Waldegrave, 3rd Earl Waldegrave

Sir Henry Waldegrave of Stanninghall and Chewton, 2nd Baronet
Sir Charles Waldegrave of Stanninghall and Chewton, 3rd Baronet
Ann/Anne Paston
Henry Waldegrave, 1st Baron Waldegrave
Sir Francis Englefield, 2nd Baronet
Helen Englefield
Winifred Brooksby
James Waldegrave, 1st Earl Waldegrave
King Charles I of England
King James II of England
Henrietta Maria of France
Henrietta FitzJames
Sir Winston Churchill
Arabella Churchill
Elizabeth Drake
John Waldegrave, 3rd Earl Waldegrave
Sir John Webb, 1st Baronet
Sir John Webb, 2nd Baronet
Mary Carrell/Caryll
Sir John Webb, 3rd Baronet
John (or William?) Blomer/Bloomer of Hatherop Castle
Mary Blomer/Bloomer
Frances Browne
Mary Webb
Sir Thomas Belasyse of Newborough, 1st Viscount Fauconberg
John Belasyse, 1st Baron Belasyse
Barbara Cholmondeley/Cholmeley/Cholmley
Barbara Belasyse

Parliament of Great Britain
Preceded by Viscount Glenorchy; John Bateman	Member of Parliament for Orford; 1747–1754; With: Henry Bilson Legge	Succeeded by John Offley; Henry Bilson Legge
Preceded by Baptist Leveson-Gower; Viscount Parker	Member of Parliament for Newcastle-under-Lyme; 1754–1763; With: Baptist Leveson-Gower 1754–1761; Henry Vernon 1761–1762; Sir Lawrence Dundas 1762–1763	Succeeded by Thomas Gilbert; Sir Lawrence Dundas
Military offices
Preceded by Sir Charles Powlett	Colonel of the 9th Regiment of Foot; 1751–1755	Succeeded by Sir Joseph Yorke
Preceded by Richard St George	Colonel of the 8th Regiment of Dragoons; 1755–1758	Succeeded by Sir Joseph Yorke
Preceded by Thomas Bligh	Colonel of the 5th Regiment of Dragoons; 1758–1759	Succeeded by John Fitzwilliam
Preceded by Lord George Sackville	Colonel of the 2nd Dragoon Guards (Queen's Bays); 1759–1773	Succeeded by The Viscount Townshend
Preceded by Richard Onslow	Governor of Plymouth; 1760–1784	Succeeded by Lord George Lennox
Preceded by The Lord Tyrawley	Colonel of the Coldstream Guards; 1773–1784	Succeeded by The Duke of York and Albany
Political offices
Preceded by The Duke of Beaufort	Master of the Horse to Queen Charlotte; 1770–1784	Succeeded by The Earl Waldegrave
Honorary titles
Preceded by The Earl of Rochford	Lord Lieutenant of Essex; 1781–1784	Succeeded by The Lord Howard de Walden
Peerage of Great Britain
Preceded by James Waldegrave	Earl Waldegrave; 1763–1784	Succeeded by George Waldegrave
