= List of Masters of the Horse to British royal consorts =

Below is an incomplete list of those who have served as Master of the Horse to British royal consorts.

After the death of William IV in 1837, the post was discontinued.

== Masters of the Horse to Philip II of Spain (1554–1558) ==
- 1554–1558: Anthony Browne, 1st Viscount Montagu

== Masters of the Horse to Anne of Denmark (1603–1619) ==
- 1603–1619: Hon. Thomas Somerset

== Masters of the Horse to Queen Henrietta Maria (1625–1669) ==
- 1639-?: Henry Jermyn, 1st Baron Jermyn
- 1663-1669: Henry Arundell, 3rd Baron Arundell of Wardour

== Masters of the Horse to Queen Catherine (1662–1685) ==
- 1662-1664: Hon. Edward Montagu
- 1665–1678: Ralph Montagu, 3rd Baron Montagu
- 1679–1680: Louis de Duras, 2nd Earl of Feversham
- 1680–1682: Richard Lumley, 2nd Viscount Lumley (Earl of Scarbrough from 1681)
- 1682–1685: Robert Shirley, 1st Earl Ferrers

== Masters of the Horse to Prince George of Denmark (1683–1708) ==
- 1685–1690: Edward Hyde, Viscount Cornbury
- 1690–1694: Edward Montagu, 3rd Earl of Sandwich
- 1694–1697: Basil Feilding, 4th Earl of Denbigh
- 1694–1705: Edward Montagu, 3rd Earl of Sandwich
- 1705–1708: Scroop Egerton, 4th Earl of Bridgewater

== Masters of the Horse to Queen Caroline (1727–1737) ==
- 1727: Charles Beauclerk, 2nd Duke of St Albans
- 1727–1737: Thomas Fermor, 1st Earl of Pomfret

== Masters of the Horse to Queen Charlotte (1761–1818) ==
- 1761–1763: Simon Harcourt, 1st Earl Harcourt
- 1763–1765: Thomas Thynne, 3rd Viscount Weymouth
- 1765–1766: Peregrine Bertie, 3rd Duke of Ancaster and Kesteven
- 1766–1768: John West, 2nd Earl De La Warr
- 1768–1770: Henry Somerset, 5th Duke of Beaufort
- 1770–1784: John Waldegrave, 3rd Earl Waldegrave
- 1784–1789: George Waldegrave, 4th Earl Waldegrave
- 1789–1791: Vacant
- 1791–1809: George Harcourt, 2nd Earl Harcourt
- 1809–1818: William Harcourt, 3rd Earl Harcourt

== Masters of the Horse to Queen Adelaide (1830–1837) ==
- 1830–1834: William Hay, 18th Earl of Erroll
- 1834–1837: William Feilding, 7th Earl of Denbigh
