= Henry Englefield =

English antiquary and astronomer

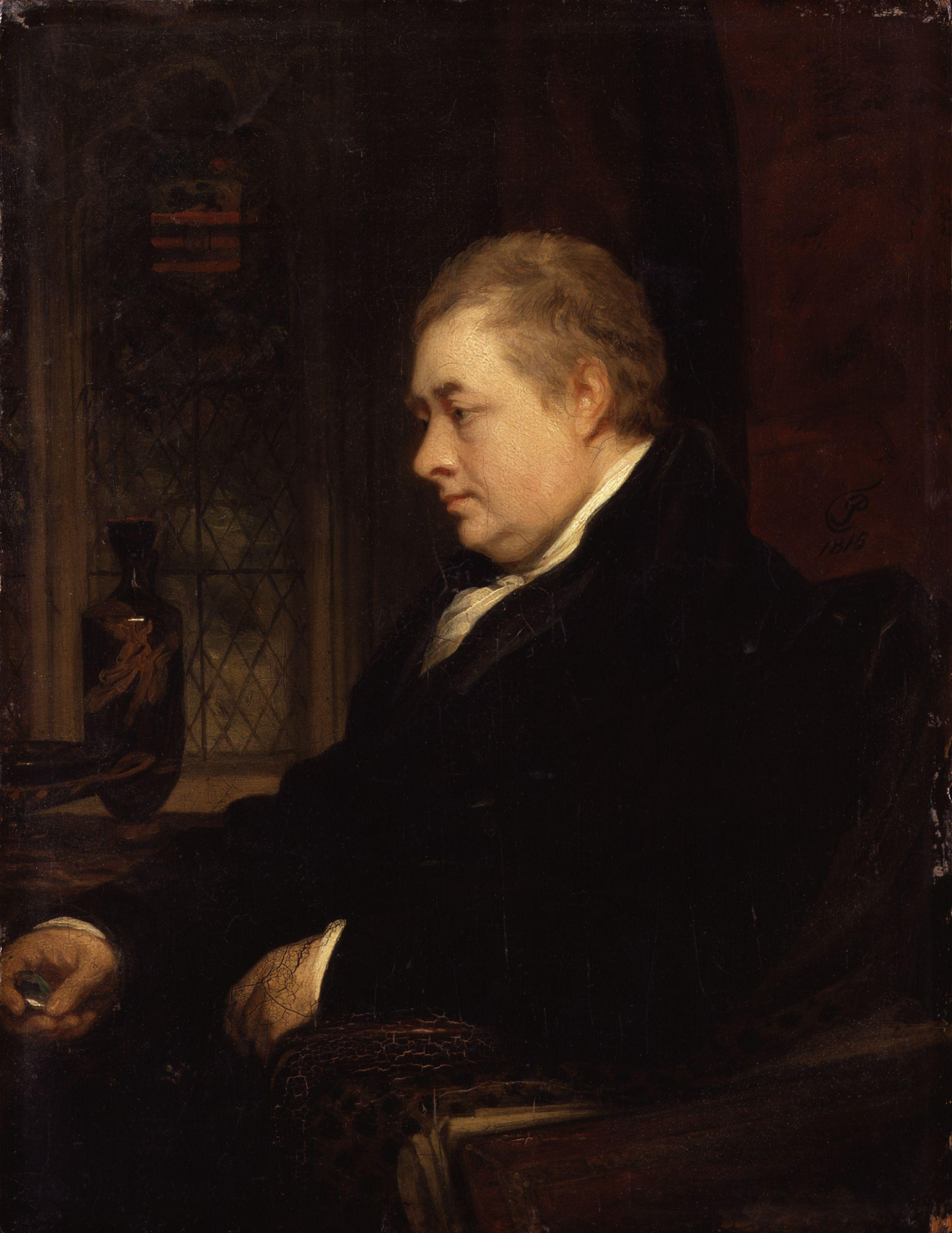
Portrait of Henry Englefield by Thomas Phillips in 1815

Sir Henry Charles Englefield, 7th Baronet FRS FRSE FSA FLS (1752 – 21 March 1822) was an English antiquary and astronomer.

== Life ==
He was the eldest son of Sir Henry Englefield, 6th Baronet (d. 1780) and his second wife, Catherine, daughter of Sir Charles Buck, 3rd Baronet. His father, who was the son of Henry Englefield, of Whiteknights Park at Earley near Reading, had in 1728 succeeded to the title and the Engelfield estates at Wootton Bassett, Wiltshire, so that he inherited both Whiteknights and Wootton Bassett on the death of his father, 25 May 1780. They were descended from the Englefield family of Englefield House in Berkshire.

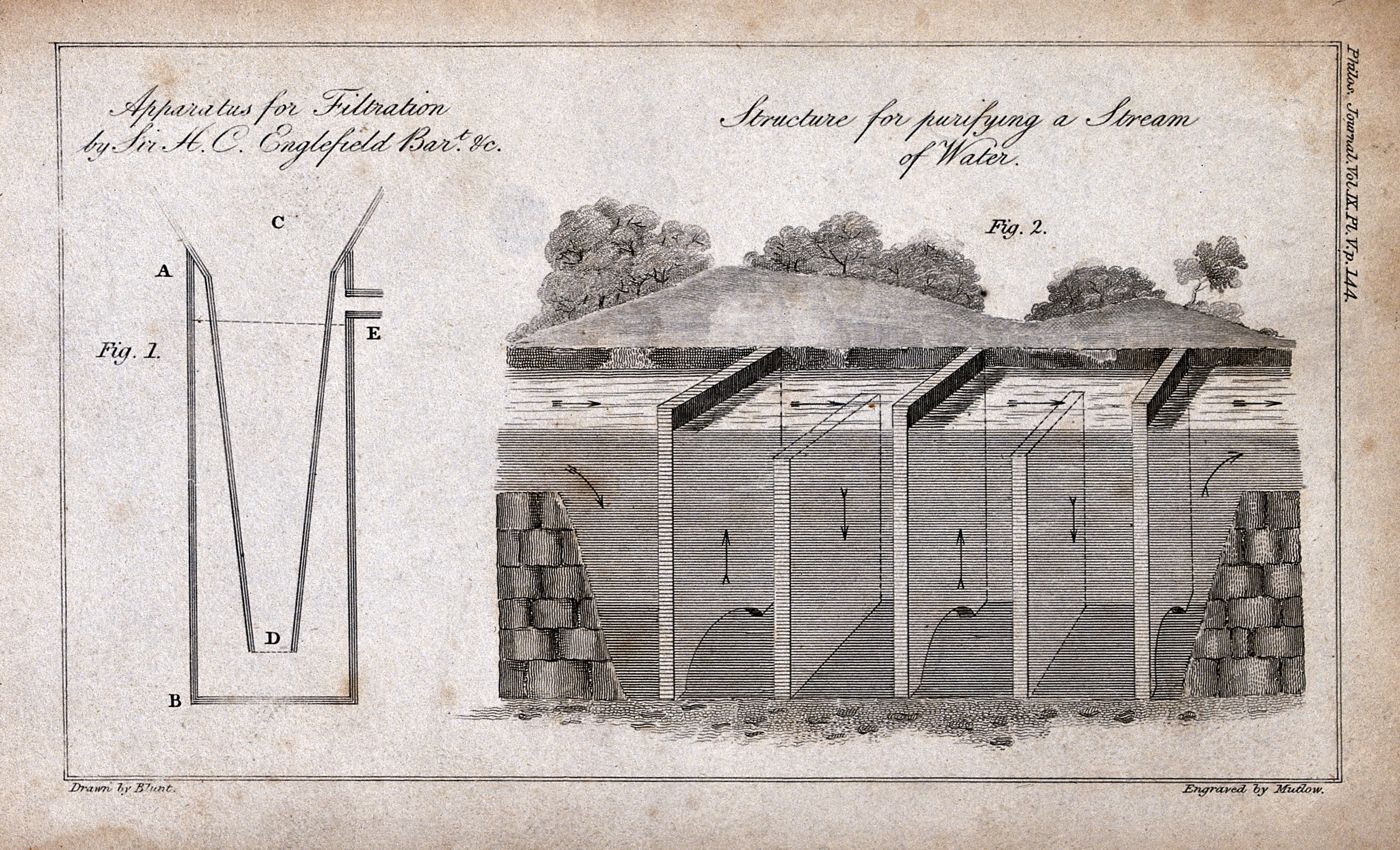
Early water filtration device illustration by Englefield

In 1778 aged 26 Englefield was elected a Fellow of the Royal Society, and in the following year Fellow of the Society of Antiquaries. For many years he was vice-president of the latter, and succeeded George Townshend, Earl of Leicester as president. Owing, however, to his being a Catholic, objection was taken to his re-election; another factor was his opposition to the 1797 election to the Society of the architect James Wyatt. He was replaced by the Earl of Aberdeen. Under his direction the society produced between 1797 and 1813 a series of engravings of English cathedrals, to which he contributed dissertations on Durham, Gloucester, and Exeter.

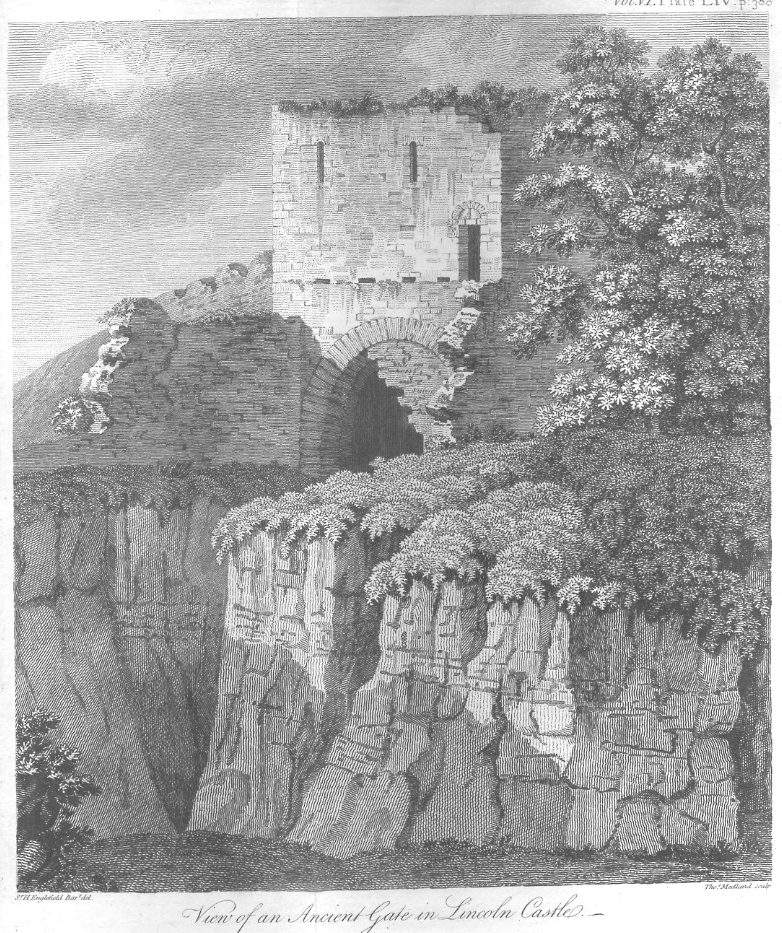
West Gate of Lincoln Castle, engraving from a drawing by Englefield

In 1781 Englefield joined the Dilettanti Society and acted as its secretary for fourteen years. Besides his antiquarian studies, which he published in contributions to Archaeologia, he carried on research in chemistry, mathematics, astronomy, and geology. His "Discovery of a Lake from Madder" won for him the gold medal of the Society of Arts. He took no part in politics, owing to Catholic disabilities, but was close to Charles James Fox. His portrait was painted by Sir Thomas Lawrence, and two bronze medals were struck bearing his likeness.

In 1782 Englefield was elected to the Catholic Committee. In its conflict with the Vicars Apostolic he contributed a pamphlet in answer to Samuel Horsley, an Anglican prelate, later pro-Catholic, before the Catholic Relief Bill of 1791. Englefield took an independent line. In 1792 he was prepared to move a strong resolution at the general meeting of English Catholics. He was dissuaded by mediators between the two parties.

During his last years Englefield's eyesight failed. He never married, and died at his house in Tilney Street, London, the baronetcy becoming extinct. He is buried in Englefield Churchyard.

== Works ==
Englefield's works were:

- Tables of the Apparent Places of the Comet of 1661 (London, 1788);
- Letter to the Author of "The Review of the Case of the Protestant Dissenters" (London, 1790);
- On the Determination of the Orbits of Comets (London, 1793);
- A Walk Through Southampton (Southampton, 1801);
- Description of a New Transit Instrument, Improved by Sir H. Englefield (London, 1814);
- The Andrian, a Verse Translation from Terrence (London, 1814);
- Description of the Principal Beauties, Antiquities and Geological Phenomena of the Isle of Wight, with engravings from his own drawings, and a portrait (London, 1816);
- Observations on the Probable Consequences of the Demolition of London Bridge (London, 1821).

Joseph Gillow printed a list of his papers contributed to the transactions of the Society of Antiquaries, Royal Society, Royal Institution, Society of Arts, and the Linnaean Society, as well as to Nicholson's Journal and Tilloch's Philosophical Magazine.

Baronetage of England
Preceded by Henry Englefield	Baronet (of Wootton Basset); 1780–1822	Extinct
