= Abbotswick =

Country house in Essex, England

Coordinates: 51°38′59″N 0°15′10″E

Abbotswick, also known as Abbotswick Hall, is a small English country house at Navestock Side in the English county of Essex. The house, which has a well-timbered garden with a small lake, dates from about 1800 but was rebuilt early in the 20th century.

== History ==
In 1817 Abbotswick was described as the seat of Adam Chadwick. In 1883 the leaseholder of the building became bankrupt and the lease was advertised for sale:

Capital old-fashioned residence, known as Abbotswick House, Navestock ... The accommodation comprises seven bedrooms, three sitting-rooms, and usual offices; four-stall stable, two coachhouses, harness-room, two-stall cowhouse &c.; large flower and kitchen gardens, and three paddocks, the whole comprising an area of about 7 acres (2.83 hectares).

On 6 September 1883 the house effects were sold onsite and listed in the Essex Herald:

Brass and iron French, folding and crib bedsteads, spring, hair and wool mattresses, feather bolsters and pillows, Witney blankets, Spanish mahogany bedroom suite, japanned ditto, marble top washstands, chests of drawers in birch and ash, Brussels and Tapestry carpets, fenders and fire implements, suite of lace and cretonne window curtains, cornice poles, black and gold frame drawing-room suite in tapestry, ditto centre table, ditto wall brackets, walnut centre table, ebonised and gilt cabinet and walnut davenport, valuable empire clock, timepieces, dial, regulator clock, weather glass, barometer, 20 clever oil paintings by known artists, beautiful statuary marble mantel shelf with tiled stove and hearth complete, coal purdonians, carved mahogany dining-room suite in morocco, sets of chairs, easy chairs and couches, set of mahogany dining tables, loo, coffee, and fancy ditto, hand sewing machine, ornaments, china, glass, fittings of hall and stairs, kitchen and dairy utensils, stone china dinner service, croquet set, lawn tennis ditto, both complete ... [gardening and stabling equipment] ... dog cart, phaeton, perambulator, pure-bred Alderney cow in calf, fast cob, 30 head poultry, 12 ducks, rabbit, retriever dog, peacock, nine pigeons, three hives of bees.

== House of prayer ==
In 1986 a charitable trust was established to run the property as a "house of prayer". In the words of the registered objects of the charity, Abbotswick was dedicated to "encouraging and enabling individuals and the community at large to promote and persist in the practice of prayer".

In 2003 the property was transferred to the Roman Catholic Diocese of Brentwood (Brentwood Diocesan Trust). Since the beginning of September 2004 it has been run by the Community of Our Lady of Walsingham.
