= Henry Waldegrave, 1st Baron Waldegrave =

English peer and Jacobite supporter

The Right Honourable The Lord Waldegrave

English Ambassador to France
- In office 1688–1689
- Preceded by: Bevil Skelton
- Succeeded by: The Earl of Portland

Comptroller of the Household
- In office 1687–1689
- Preceded by: The Lord Maynard
- Succeeded by: The Lord Wharton

Personal details
- Born: 1661
- Died: 24 January 1689 (aged 27–28)
- Spouse: Henrietta FitzJames (m. 1683)
- Children: 3, including James

Henry Waldegrave, 1st Baron Waldegrave (1661 – 24 January 1689) was an English peer.

== Early life ==
He was the son of Sir Charles Waldegrave, 3rd Baronet and Eleanor, Lady Waldegrave (née Englefield), a daughter of Sir Francis Englefield, 2nd Baronet.

== Career ==
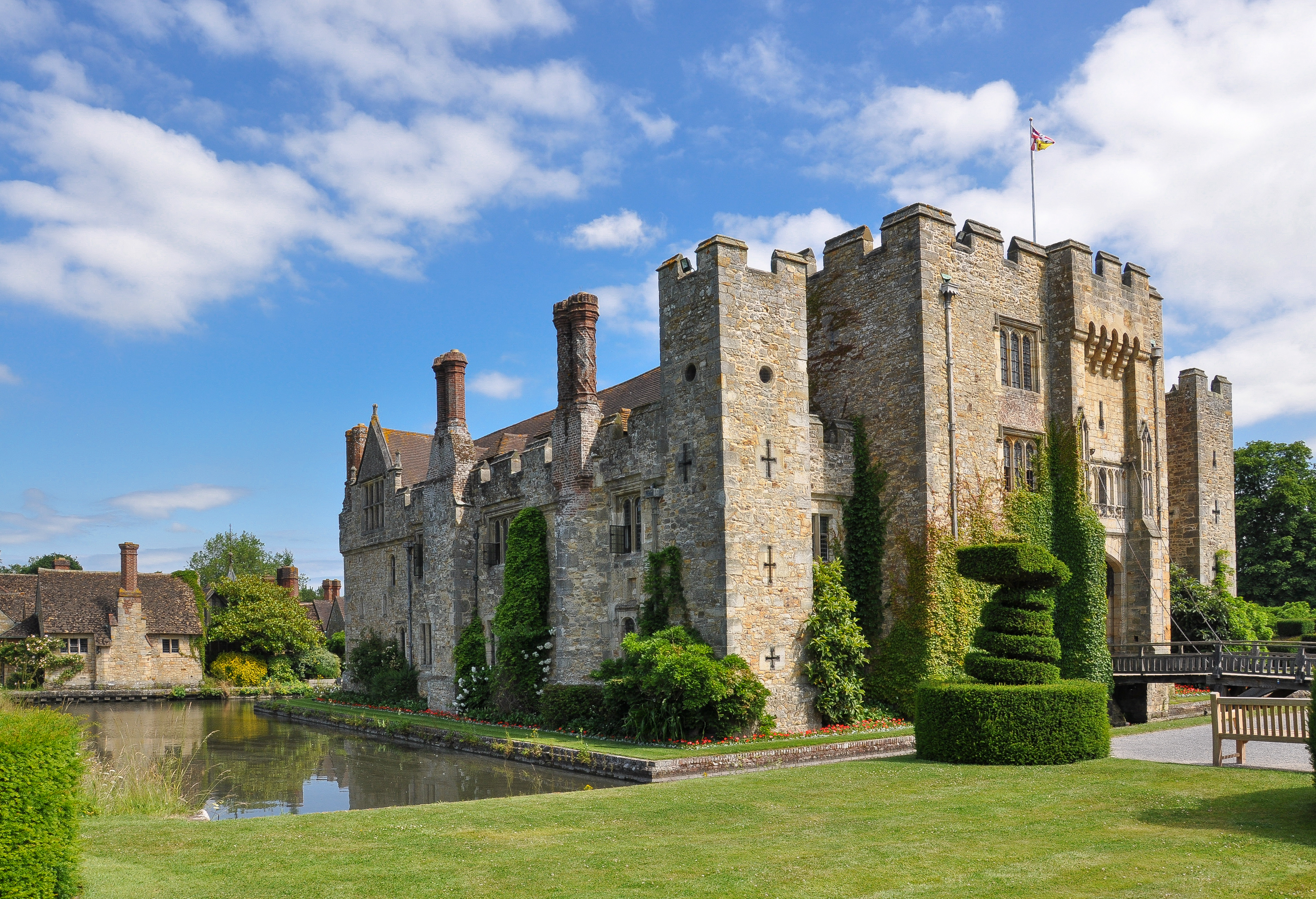
Hever Castle

Waldegrave inherited his father's title, becoming 4th Baronet Waldegrave, of Hever Castle, around 1684. As a result of his marriage, he was raised to the peerage as Baron Waldegrave, of Chewton, Somerset, in 1686.

He became Comptroller of the Household in 1687 and continued in this office at the King's court-in-exile at Saint-Germain-en-Laye, until his death in 1689. In 1688, he was appointed to succeed Bevil Skelton as the English Ambassador to France, serving until 1689.

== Personal life ==
On 29 November 1683, he married Henrietta FitzJames (1667–1730), an illegitimate daughter of King James II and his mistress, Arabella Churchill (sister of John Churchill, 1st Duke of Marlborough). He had three children:

- James Waldegrave, 1st Earl Waldegrave (1684–1741), who married Mary Webb, daughter of Sir John Webb, 3rd Baronet, in 1714.
- Hon. Arabella Waldegrave (1687–1740), who became a nun.
- Hon. Henry Waldegrave (1688–c. 1726)

Lord Waldegrave died on 24 January 1689. After his death, his widow married Piers Butler, 3rd Viscount Galmoye.

=== Descendants ===
Through his son James, he was a grandfather of James Waldegrave, 2nd Earl Waldegrave, John Waldegrave, 3rd Earl Waldegrave, and Lady Henrietta Waldegrave (who married Lord Edward Herbert, a son of the 2nd Marquess of Powis; and secondly, John Beard (a singer at Covent Garden). He was also a 7th great-grandfather of Diana, Princess of Wales, first wife of Charles III.

Political offices
Preceded by The Lord Maynard	Comptroller of the Household; 1687–1689	Succeeded by The Lord Wharton
Diplomatic posts
Preceded by Bevil Skelton	English Ambassador to France; 1688–1689	Vacant Nine Years' War Title next held by The Earl of Portland
Honorary titles
Preceded by The Duke of Somerset	Lord Lieutenant of Somerset; 1687–1689	Succeeded by The Viscount Fitzhardinge
Preceded by The Viscount Fitzhardinge	Custos Rotulorum of Somerset; 1688	Succeeded by The Viscount Fitzhardinge
Peerage of England
New creation	Baron Waldegrave; 1686–1689	Succeeded by James Waldegrave
Baronetage of England
Preceded by Charles Waldegrave	Baronet (of Hever Castle) c. 1684–1689	Succeeded by James Waldegrave
