= Richard Newman (English cricketer) =

English cricketer and match organizer

Personal information
- Full name: Richard Newman Harding Newman
- Born: 1756 or 1757
- Died: 1808 (aged 51); Tempsford, Bedfordshire
- Role: Batsman

Domestic team information
- Years: Team
- 1787–1793: Hornchurch
- 1793: Marylebone Cricket Club (MCC)

Richard Newman Harding Newman (1756/1757 – 1808), born Richard Newman Harding, was an English landowner and cricketer who was the absentee landlord of a Jamaican slave plantation and a huntsman. He was the subject of a portrait by George Romney.

== Life and family ==
Harding Newman (Note: Born Harding, he changed his surname to Newman as a condition of an inheritance, but by the end of his life was using the name Harding again. One of his sons was known by the surname Newman, the other as Harding. For convenience this article refers to him as Harding Newman throughout, although cricket databases use the name Newman, the surname he used at the time he played matches.) was born in 1756 or 1757, the oldest son of Benjamin Harding and Sarah (née Newman). The family lived at Hacton House close to Hornchurch in Essex, but he was baptised at Croydon in Surrey in May 1757. Benjamin Harding owned 336 acres (136 ha) of land in Hanover Parish on Jamaica, made up of two plantations at Blue Hole and Newman Hall which produced sugar, rum and molasses. Harding Newman inherited a third of the estates alongside his brothers John and Benjamin, following their father's death in 1766. The estates were valued at over £12,000, with more than £10,000 of that value coming from the 198 enslaved people owned by the plantations. He retained ownership of the Blue Hole estate with John until his death.

In 1766, Harding Newman's maternal grandfather Richard Newman died, leaving property in Essex, including land at West Ham Abbey, to him. As a condition of the will he added the surname Newman to his name in 1783, although it appears that in later life he reverted to Harding as his primary surname. He owned other property in the county, including at Romford, and in 1781 purchased the manor of Nelmes near to Hornchurch.

Harding Newman married twice. His first marriage was to Harriet Schütz at Westminster in 1776 when he was 17. Harriet was the daughter of Francis Schütz of Gillingham Hall in Norfolk, the third-cousin of Frederick, Prince of Wales. The marriage produced two surviving sons, Thomas Harding Newman and Benjamin Newman Harding. (Note: Thomas inherited his father's share of Blue Hole, although both sons later inherited a share of the property after the death of their aunt Eliza in 1831.) Following Harriet's death, Harding Newman married Rosamond Bradish in 1806; the marriage produce a further two children before his death two years later. (Note: Little is known of the children from Harding Newman's second marriage. Neither seems to have been a beneficiary of his will.)

Well known as a huntsman, Harding Newman was, according to obituaries, well known in "agricultural circles" and claimed to be a philanthropist. He served as a Justice of the Peace and was commissioned in the Loyal Havering Volunteer Cavalry, serving as the commanding officer of the troop, an Essex Yeomanry unit of provisional cavalry. As well as his estates in Essex, he had inherited land at Black Callerton in Northumberland and at Great Clacton in Essex through the Schütz family.

Harding Newman died at Tempsford in Bedfordshire in 1808 aged 51. (Note: His will was proved in December 1808. Contemporary sources write that he was in his 52nd year, suggesting an age of 51.) His son, Thomas, inherited his Essex estates as well as the slave estates in Jamaica; when he remarried in 1818 Thomas' second wife, Eliza Hall, may have received The Rice portrait, possibly of a young Jane Austen, as a wedding present. (Note: The Rice portrait is the subject of some controversy and it is somewhat unclear how it came into the possession of the Harding Newman family. It was confirmed to have been owned by the Reverend Dr Thomas Harding Newman, Richard Harding Newman's grandson, in 1880.) Nelmes House was later owned by Thomas' son, also named Thomas, who was a clergyman and fellow of Magdalen College, Oxford. Harding Newman's other son Benjamin served in the British Army, rising to the rank of lieutenant colonel.

== Portrait ==
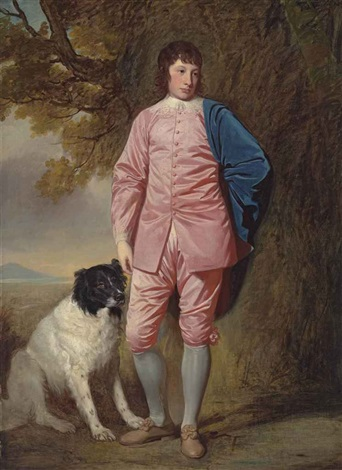
Portrait of Harding Newman by George Romney in 1770/71

Around 1770 or 1771, Harding Newman was the subject of a portrait by George Romney; at the time, the artist was coming to prominence as one of the leading portrait artists in London. It depicts Harding Newman dressed in pink with a hunting dog. The painting remained in the family until 1890 and was later owned by Alfred de Rothschild and then by Michael Arthur Bass. It was sold in 2014 at Christie's for £194,500 as "a characteristic work of the period" which displays "bravura brushwork [which] is combined with passages of masterfully subtle observation".

The picture has sometimes been called The Pink Boy, drawing comparisons to Thomas Gainsborough's portrait The Blue Boy. Whilst Bass owned the portrait it was hung at Chesterfield House in Mayfair, close to where The Blue Boy was hung at Grosvenor House.

== Cricket ==
Harding Newman is known to have played cricket between 1773 and 1793. His first known match was in 1773 for Kent against Surrey. Most of his known cricket was played after 1785. He played matches for the White Conduit Club and then for Marylebone Cricket Club (MCC) following its founding in 1787, and for the Hornchurch Cricket Club and Essex. (Note: Hornchurch Cricket Club played nine matches between 1787 and 1793. Harding Newman played in four of these as well as one played by Essex. The club was one of the earliest to organise matches in south Essex.) He was an early member of MCC and scored the first half century at Lord's Old Ground while playing for Essex in the ground's first known match in 1787.

Newman played 14 matches in 1793, the final year in which he appears on scorecards. His final match was for a team he organised himself against one put together by Richard Leigh, played at Navestock Side in Essex. The ground is still used by Navestock Side Cricket Club today.
