= 87th Regiment of Foot (1779) =

- Active: 1779–1783
- Country: Kingdom of Great Britain (1707–1800)
- Branch: British Army
- Type: Infantry
- Engagements: American Revolutionary War

Commanders
- Lt. Col.: George Finch, 9th Earl of Winchilsea

The 87th Regiment of Foot was a line infantry regiment of the British Army. It was raised to help garrison the West Indies during the American Revolutionary War.

== History ==
The regiment was raised at Bromsgrove in Worcestershire by George Waldegrave in July 1779. It was despatched to the Leeward Islands under the command of Lieutenant-colonel George Finch, 9th Earl of Winchilsea, arriving in January 1780. It returned home in 1783 at the end of hostilities and was disbanded at Coventry in April that year.
