= Englefield baronets =

Extinct baronetcy in the Baronetage of England

The Englefield Baronetcy, of Wootton Basset in the County of Wiltshire, was a title in the Baronetage of England. It was created on 25 November 1611 for Francis Englefield. He was a great-grandson of Sir Thomas Englefield, Speaker of the House of Commons, and the nephew of Sir Francis Englefield. The seventh Baronet was an antiquary and scientist. The title became extinct on his death in 1822.

== Englefield baronets, of Wootton Basset (1611) ==
- Sir Francis Englefield, 1st Baronet (c. 1561–1631)
- Sir Francis Englefield, 2nd Baronet (died 1656)
- Sir Francis Englefield, 3rd Baronet (died 1665)
- Sir Thomas Englefield, 4th Baronet (died 1678)
- Sir Charles Englefield, 5th Baronet (c. 1670–1728)
- Sir Henry Englefield, 6th Baronet (died 1780)
- Sir Henry Charles Englefield, 7th Baronet (1752–1822)

Baronetage of England
Preceded by Portman baronets	Englefield baronets 25 November 1611	Succeeded by Mohun baronets
