= James Waldegrave, 1st Earl Waldegrave =

British diplomat

Lord Waldgrave's Estate Act 1691
- Act of Parliament
- Parliament of England
- Long title: An Act to enable Trustees of the Right Honourable James Lord Waldegrave to make Leases, and grant Copyhold Estates, for the Payment of the Arrears of Annuities of Henry Lord Waldegrave his Father, deceased.
- Citation: 3 Will. & Mar. c. 18 Pr.
- Territorial extent: England and Wales

Dates
- Royal assent: 24 February 1692
- Commencement: 22 October 1691 (Note: Start of session.)

Status: Current legislation

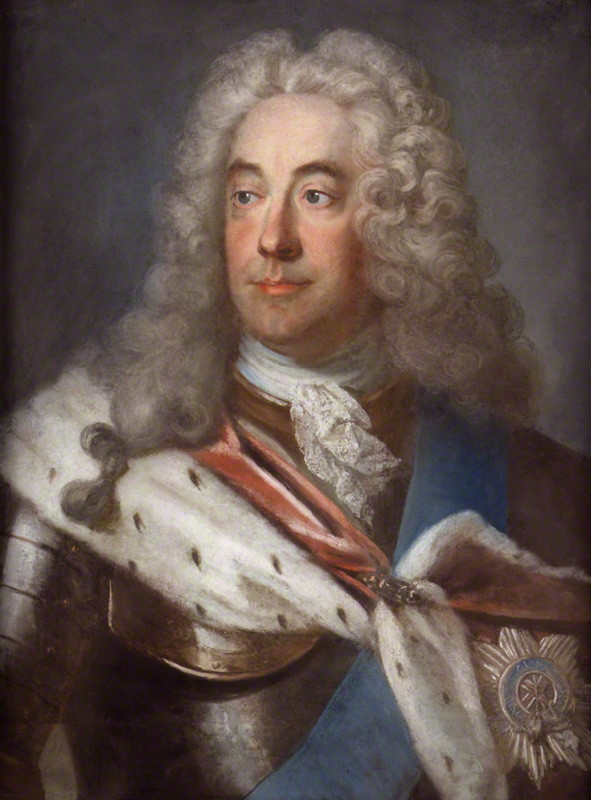
James Waldegrave

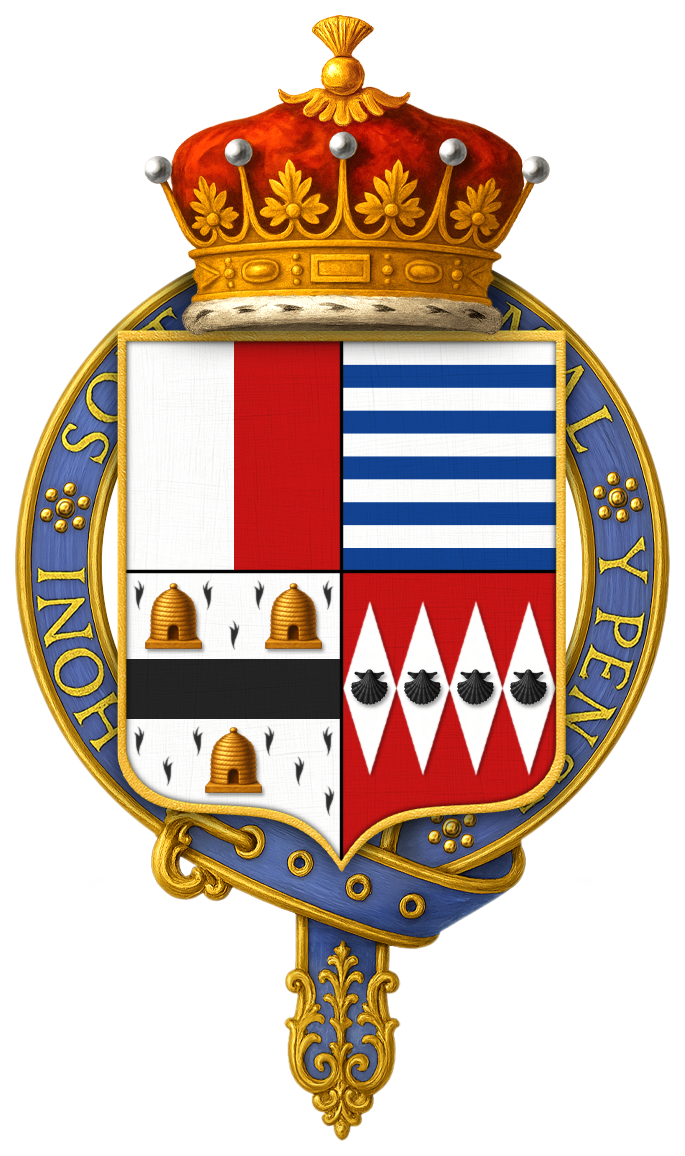
Quartered arms of James Waldegrave, 1st Earl Waldegrave, KG

James Waldegrave, 1st Earl Waldegrave, KG, PC (1684 – 11 April 1741) was a British diplomat who served as the British ambassador to France from 1730 to 1740.

== Life ==
Waldegrave was the son of the 1st Baron Waldegrave and Henrietta FitzJames, the illegitimate daughter of James II and his mistress, Arabella Churchill.

Educated in France, Waldegrave inherited his father's title in 1690, and, on 20 May 1714, he married Mary Webb (who died in childbirth in 1719), a daughter of Sir John Webb, 3rd Baronet and they had three surviving children:

- James Waldegrave, 2nd Earl Waldegrave (1715–1763)
- John Waldegrave, 3rd Earl Waldegrave (1718–1784)
- Lady Henrietta Waldegrave (1717–1753), married firstly, Lord Edward Herbert, a son of the 2nd Marquess of Powis and had issue; married secondly, John Beard (a singer at Covent Garden).

After the death of his wife, he returned to England from the Jacobite court in exile and converted from Roman Catholicism (the religion he was brought up in) to Anglicanism in order to take his seat in the House of Lords. He was briefly a Lord of the Bedchamber in 1723 and again from 1730 to 1741. He was ambassador extraordinary to France in 1725 and Ambassador to Austria from 1727 to 1730. He then succeeded Horatio Walpole as ambassador to France from 1730 to 1740.

During his ambassadorship to France, he still spent enough time in London to be one of the founding Governors of the new charity there, known as the Foundling Hospital (created in 1739). In 1729, he had been created Earl Waldegrave and on his death in 1741, was succeeded by his eldest son, James.

Sir James inherited Hever Castle in Kent which had remained in the Waldegrave family for 160 years. It was deemed too small for Sir James and he sold it in the early 1700s to Sir William Humfreys, Lord Mayor of London (1714).

== Ancestry ==
Ancestors of James Waldegrave, 1st Earl Waldegrave

16. Sir Edward Waldegrave, 1st Baronet, of Hever Castle
8. Sir Henry Waldegrave, 2nd Baronet, of Hever Castle
17. Eleanor Lovell
4. Sir Charles Waldegrave, 3rd Baronet, of Hever Castle
18. Edward Paston
9. Anne Paston
19. Margaret Berney
2. Henry Waldegrave, 1st Baron Waldegrave
20. Sir Francis Englefield, 1st Baronet, of Wootton Basset
10. Sir Francis Englefield, 2nd Baronet, of Wootton Basset
21. Jane Browne
5. Helen Englefield
22. William Brooksby
11. Winifred Brooksby
23. Dorothy Wiseman
1. James Waldegrave, 1st Earl Waldegrave
24. James VI of Scotland and I of England
12. Charles I of England
25. Anne of Denmark
6. James II of England
26. Henry IV of France
13. Henrietta Maria of France
27. Marie de' Medici
3. Henrietta FitzJames
28. John Churchill
14. Sir Winston Churchill
29. Sarah Winston
7. Arabella Churchill
30. Sir John Drake
15. Elizabeth Drake
31. The Hon. Eleanor Boteler

== Notes ==
Diplomatic posts
Preceded by François-Louis de Pesmes de Saint-Saphorin	British ambassador to Austria; 1727–1730	Succeeded by Thomas Robinson
Preceded by The Lord Walpole of Wolterton	British ambassador to France; 1730–1740	Succeeded by Anthony Thompson
Honorary titles
Preceded by Robert Honywood	Vice-Admiral of Essex; 1735–1741	Vacant Title next held by The Earl of Rochford
Peerage of Great Britain
New creation	Earl Waldegrave; 1729–1741	Succeeded by James Waldegrave
Peerage of England
Preceded by Henry Waldegrave	Baron Waldegrave; 1690–1741	Succeeded by James Waldegrave
