= Navestock Side =

Hamlet in Essex, England

Coordinates: 51.651°N 0.257°E

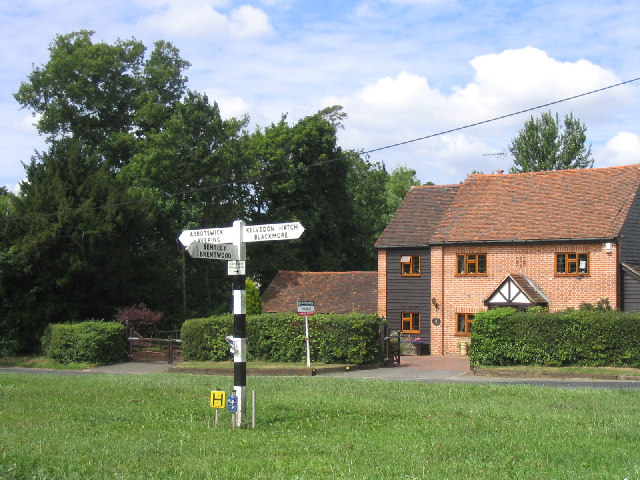

- Location within Essex
- Civil parish: Navestock
- District: Brentwood
- Shire county: Essex
- Region: East
- Country: England
- Sovereign state: United Kingdom
- Police: Essex
- Fire: Essex
- Ambulance: East of England

Navestock Side is a hamlet near the A128 road, in the civil parish of Navestock, in the Brentwood district, in the county of Essex, England. It is about three miles from the town of Brentwood. It has a small country house called Abbotswick.

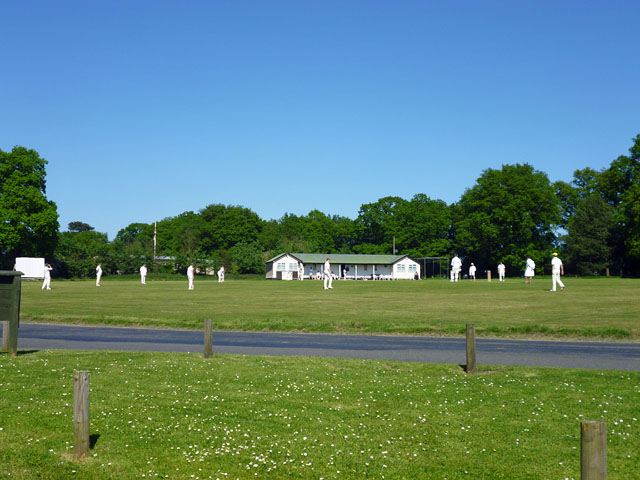
Cricket being played on the Green

There is a cricket ground on The Green which is used by Navestock Side Cricket Club. The team has two sides playing in the Mid Essex Cricket League. The ground has been used since the 18th century and during the 1790s was known as a "centre" for cricket, with the Essex Cricket Club playing matches fortnightly at the ground. During the 19th century it was the home of West Essex Cricket Club, one of the best known clubs in the country.

A restaurant, Alec's, is on the edge of The Green. This was formerly a pub, The Green Man, which was rebuilt in the 18th century when the green outside it began being used as a major cricket ground. Essex County Cricket Club was founded in the pub in 1790. The area to the east of the Green was used for horse racing in the 19th century. Races had stopped being held by 1906.
