= Henrietta FitzJames =

Illegitimate daughter of James II of England

Henrietta Butler
- Viscountess Galmoye
- Born: 1667
- Died: 3 April 1730 (aged 62–63)
- Buried: Navestock
- Noble family: FitzJames
- Spouses: Henry Waldegrave, 1st Baron Waldegrave; Piers Butler, 3rd Viscount Galmoye
- Issue: Arabella Waldegrave; James Waldegrave, 1st Earl Waldegrave
- Father: James II of England
- Mother: Arabella Churchill

Henrietta Butler, Viscountess Galmoye, previously Henrietta Waldegrave, Baroness Waldegrave (née Lady Henrietta FitzJames; 1667 – 3 April 1730), was an illegitimate daughter of James Stuart, Duke of York, subsequently King of England, Scotland and Ireland, by his mistress, Arabella Churchill (a sister of the first Duke of Marlborough). Upon marrying, she became Lady Waldegrave, and then with her second marriage Viscountess Galmoye, as well as Countess of Newcastle (in the Jacobite Peerage).

== Early life and first marriage ==
Henrietta was the sister of the celebrated James FitzJames, 1st Duke of Berwick, who was exiled.

She was brought up a Roman Catholic and married into a family of the same religion. In 1683, she married Henry Waldegrave, who was made the 1st Baron Waldegrave following the accession of King James II. Henrietta and Henry had three children:

- James Waldegrave, 1st Earl Waldegrave, who married Mary Webb (died 1719); with Issue.
- The Hon. Arabella Waldegrave (1687 - 1740), a Nun
- The Hon. Henry Waldegrave (1688 - 1726)

== Later life ==
She accompanied her father and his wife in their exile and lived some years at Saint-Germain-en-Laye in France. After her husband's death in 1689, she was involved with an Irish soldier, Mark Talbot.

She subsequently married Piers Butler, 3rd Viscount Galmoye, on 3 April 1695. He had been created Earl of Newcastle in the Jacobite Peerage in 1692. The marriage was childless. She died in 1730 and was buried in Navestock.

== Ancestry ==
Ancestors of Henrietta FitzJames

16. Henry Stuart, Lord Darnley
8. James I of England
17. Mary, Queen of Scots
4. Charles I of England
18. Frederick II of Denmark
9. Anne of Denmark
19. Sophie of Mecklenburg
2. James II of England
20. Antoine of Navarre
10. Henry IV of France
21. Jeanne III of Navarre
5. Henrietta Maria of France
22. Francesco I de' Medici, Grand Duke of Tuscany
11. Marie de' Medici
23. Johanna of Austria
1. Henrietta FitzJames
24. Jasper Churchill
12. Sir John Churchill
25. Elizabeth Chaplet
6. Sir Winston Churchill
26. Sir Henry Winston
13. Sarah Winston
27. Dionese Bond
3. Arabella Churchill
28. John Drake
14. Sir John Drake
29. Dorothy Button
7. Elizabeth Drake
30. John Boteler, 1st Baron Boteler of Brantfield
15. Eleanor Boteler
31. Elizabeth Villiers

*Henrietta's uncle, her mother's brother the Duke of Marlborough, commanded British troops in the War of the Spanish Succession.
