= Webb baronets =

Extinct baronetcy in the Baronetage of the United Kingdom

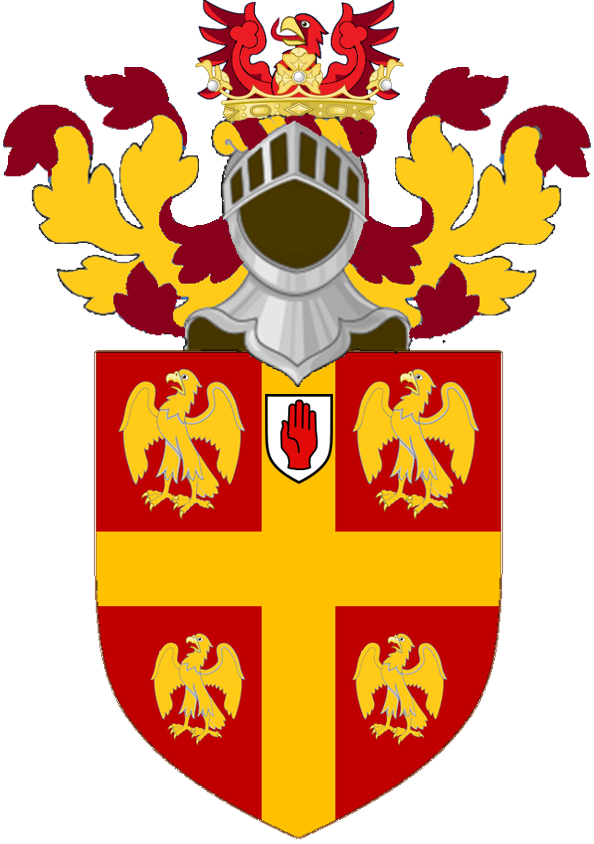
Coat of Arms of Sir Henry Webb

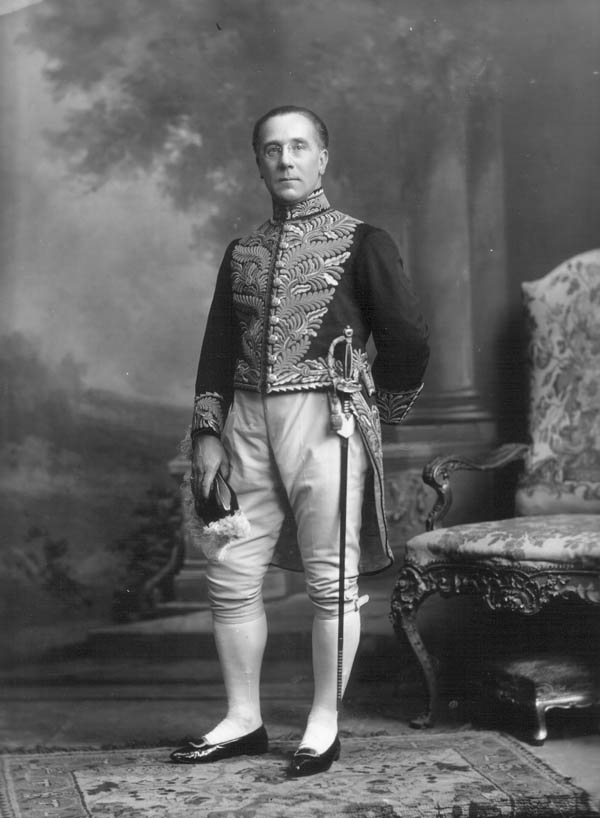
Sir Henry Webb, 1st Baronet

There have been two Baronetcies created for persons with the surname Webb, one in the Baronetage of England and one in the Baronetage of the United Kingdom. Both creations are extinct.

The Webb Baronetcy, of Odstock, Wiltshire, was created in the Baronetage of England on 2 April 1644 for Sir John Webb as a reward for support King Charles II. The title became extinct on the death of the seventh Baronet in 1874.

The Webb Baronetcy, of Llwynarthen, Monmouthshire, was created in the Baronetage of the United Kingdom on 28 January 1916 for Henry Webb, who was Member of Parliament for Forest of Dean (1911–1918) and Cardiff East (1923–1924). On his death the title became extinct.

== Webb baronets, of Odstock, Wiltshire (1644) ==
- Sir John Webb, 1st Baronet (died 1680)
- Sir John Webb, 2nd Baronet (died 1700)
- Sir John Webb, 3rd Baronet (died 1745)
- Sir Thomas Webb, 4th Baronet (died 1763)
- Sir John Webb, 5th Baronet (died 1797)
- Sir Thomas Webb, 6th Baronet (c. 1774–1823)
- Sir Henry Webb, 7th Baronet (1806–1874)

== Webb baronets, of Llwynarthen, Monmouthshire (1916) ==
- Sir Henry Webb, 1st Baronet (1866–1940)

== See also ==
- Webb-Johnson baronetcy
