= Arabella Churchill (royal mistress) =

Mistress of James II of England and VII of Scotland

- Born: 23 February 1648
- Died: 30 May 1730 (aged 82)
- Known for: Mistress of James II and VII, King of England, Scotland, and Ireland
- Spouse: Charles Godfrey
- Partner: King James II and VII
- Children: Henrietta, Countess of Newcastle; James FitzJames, 1st Duke of Berwick; Henry FitzJames, 1st Duke of Albemarle; Arabella FitzJames; Francis Godfrey; Charlotte, Viscountess Falmouth; Elizabeth Dunch
- Parent(s): Sir Winston Churchill; Elizabeth Drake

Arabella Churchill (23 February 1648 – 30 May 1730) was the mistress of King James II and VII, and the mother of four of his children (surnamed FitzJames, that is, "son of James").

== Biography ==
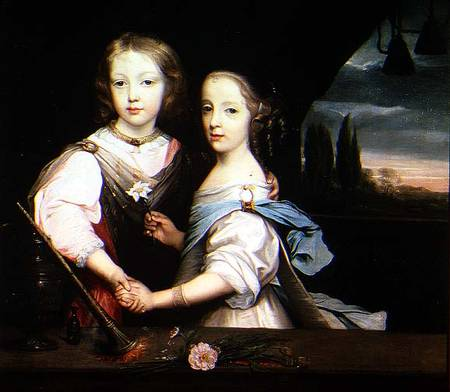
Portrait of Winston and Arabella Churchill, children of Sir Winston Churchill by Peter Lely

Arabella was a daughter of Sir Winston Churchill and sister of John Churchill, 1st Duke of Marlborough; her other brothers were George Churchill, Admiral of the Blue and General Charles Churchill.

James, then Duke of York, began his adulterous affair with Arabella around 1665, while he was still married to Anne Hyde. She became the duchess's lady-in-waiting in that year. The Churchills' only feeling about Arabella's seduction by King James II "seems to have been a joyful surprise that so plain a girl had attained such high preferment".

Arabella gave birth to two children during Anne's lifetime, and James would remain with her through ten years and four children in total.

On 1 June 1680 at the Church of Holy Trinity, Minories, London, she married Charles Godfrey and had three more children. They lived together for more than three decades. Godfrey died in 1714, at the age of 67. She survived him by 16 years, dying in 1730 aged 82.

== Children ==
=== Children with James II of England ===
1. Henrietta FitzJames, Countess of Newcastle, (1667 – 3 April 1730)
2. James FitzJames, 1st Duke of Berwick (1670–1734)
3. Henry FitzJames, 1st Duke of Albemarle (1673–1702)
4. Arabella FitzJames (1674 – 7 November 1704); became a nun

From her children Henrietta, Countess of Newcastle, and James, Duke of Berwick, she is an ancestor of the Earls Spencer and Diana, Princess of Wales as well as of the Dukes of Berwick, the later Dukes of Alba and of Cayetana Fitz-James Stuart, 18th Duchess of Alba, who at the time of her death was the person with the most noble titles in the world.

=== Children with Charles Godfrey ===
1. Francis Godfrey
2. Charlotte Godfrey, born before 1685, married Hugh Boscawen, 1st Viscount Falmouth
3. Elizabeth Godfrey, married Edmund Dunch, son of Hungerford Dunch
