= Duchess of Gloucester =

Royal title

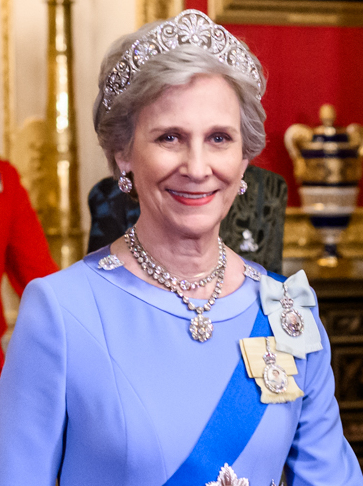
- First holder: Eleanor de Bohun
- Present holder: Birgitte van Deurs Henriksen
- Status: Current

Duchess of Gloucester is the principal courtesy title used by the wife of the Duke of Gloucester. There have been five titles referring to Gloucester since the 14th century. The current duchess is Birgitte, the wife of Prince Richard. He inherited the dukedom on 10 June 1974 upon the death of his father, Prince Henry, the third son of George V.

== History ==
When Thomas of Woodstock, youngest son of Edward III and Philippa of Hainault, was created duke of Gloucester around 1385, his wife Eleanor de Bohun, daughter of Humphrey de Bohun, 7th Earl of Hereford, and Joan Fitzalan, became duchess of Gloucester. Thomas was stripped of his dukedom after being declared guilty of treason in 1397. Their son Humphrey, 2nd Earl of Buckingham, did not inherit. Thomas died in 1397 and his duchess, Eleanor in 1399.

The next duchess was Jacqueline, Countess of Hainaut, daughter of William II, Duke of Bavaria, and Margaret of Burgundy, the wife of Humphrey of Lancaster, Duke of Gloucester, who had been created duke in 1414. They married in 1422 but the marriage was annulled in 1428. Humphrey then married his mistress, Eleanor Cobham, of the Cobham family, after the annulment of his marriage of Jacqueline, but this married was also annulled. Humphrey died in 1447 with no legitimate issue, thus the dukedom was extinct.

Anne, Dowager Princess of Wales, widow of Edward of Westminster, Prince of Wales, married Richard, Duke of Gloucester, who had been made duke in 1461, in 1472. The dukedom merged with the crown upon his accession to the throne in 1483 and Anne became queen consort.

The next dukes of Gloucester, Henry Stuart, died unmarried. The next two, Prince William and Prince Frederick, were only styled as Duke of Gloucester and died unmarried or were unmarried during their time styled as duke.

The next iteration of the title was as the joint dukedom of Gloucester and Edinburgh, created in 1764 for Prince William Henry, younger brother of George III. Prince William Henry married Maria Waldegrave, Dowager Countess Waldegrave, the illegitimate daughter of Sir Edward Walpole, in 1766, thus making her the first Duchess of Gloucester and Edinburgh. Prince William Henry died in 1805. His son and successor, Prince William Frederick, married his first cousin Princess Mary in 1816. They had no children and Prince William Frederick died in 1834, the dukedom becoming extinct on his death.

George V created his third son Prince Henry duke of Gloucester in 1928. When he married Lady Alice Montagu Douglas Scott in 1935, she became his duchess. They had two sons, Prince William and Prince Richard. Prince Henry died in 1974, Prince William predeceased him and he was thus succeeded by his second son Prince Richard, whose wife, Birgitte van Deurs Henriksen, whom he had married in 1972, became duchess and has remained so since.

== List of titleholders ==
=== Duchess of Gloucester (England, 1385–1397) ===
Other titles: Duchess of Aumale, Countess of Buckingham, Countess of Essex

Duchess	Portrait	Birth	Marriage(s)	Death
Eleanor de Bohun; Bohun family 1385–1397		c. 1366 – daughter of Humphrey de Bohun, 7th Earl of Hereford, and Joan Fitzalan	1376; Thomas of Woodstock; 5 children	3 October 1399 aged 32 or 33

=== Duchess of Gloucester (England, 1414–1447) ===
Other titles: Countess of Pembroke

Duchess	Portrait	Birth	Marriage(s)	Death
Jacqueline, Countess of Hainaut; House of Wittelsbach; 1422–1428		15 July 1401; Le Quesnoy, County of Hainaut – daughter of William II, Duke of Bavaria, and Margaret of Burgundy	1422–1428 (annulled); Humphrey of Lancaster; 1 child (stillborn)	8 October 1436 aged 35
Eleanor Cobham; Cobham family 1428–1441		c. 1400; Starborough Castle, Surrey – daughter of Reynold Cobham, 3rd Baron Cobham, and Eleanor Culpeper	1428–1441 (annulled); Humphrey of Lancaster; 2 children	7 July 1452 aged 51 or 52

=== Duchess of Gloucester (England, 1461–1483) ===
Duchess	Portrait	Birth	Marriage(s)	Death
Anne, Dowager Princess of Wales; House of Neville; 1472–1483		11 June 1456; Warwick Castle, Warwickshire – daughter of Richard Neville, 16th Earl of Warwick, and Anne Beauchamp	1472; Richard, Duke of Gloucester; 1 child	16 March 1485 aged 28

=== Duchess of Gloucester and Edinburgh (Great Britain, 1764–1834) ===
Other titles: Countess of Connaught

Duchess	Portrait	Birth	Marriage(s)	Death	Arms
Maria Waldegrave, Dowager Countess Waldegrave; Walpole family 1766–1805		10 July 1736; St James's, Westminster – daughter of Sir Edward Walpole and Dorothy Clement	6 September 1766; Prince William Henry, Duke of Gloucester and Edinburgh; 3 children	22 August 1807 aged 71	
The Princess Mary; House of Hanover; 1816–1834		25 April 1776; Buckingham House, London – daughter of George III and Charlotte of Mecklenburg-Strelitz	22 July 1816; Prince William Frederick, Duke of Gloucester and Edinburgh; No children	30 April 1857 aged 81	

=== Duchess of Gloucester (United Kingdom, 1928–present) ===
Other titles: Countess of Ulster, Baroness Culloden

Duchess	Portrait	Birth	Marriage(s)	Death	Arms
Lady Alice Montagu Douglas Scott; Montagu Douglas Scott family 1935–1974		25 December 1901; Montagu House, London – daughter of John Montagu Douglas Scott, 7th Duke of Buccleuch and 9th Duke of Queensberry, and Lady Margaret Bridgeman	6 November 1935; Prince Henry, Duke of Gloucester; 2 children	29 October 2004 aged 102	
Birgitte van Deurs Henriksen; Henriksen family 1974–present		20 June 1946; Odense, Denmark – daughter of Asger Henriksen and Vivian van Deurs	8 July 1972; Prince Richard, Duke of Gloucester; 3 children	– now 80 years, 111 days old	

== Possible future duchesses ==
Richard and Birgitte's only son Alexander Windsor, Earl of Ulster, married Claire Booth in 2002. They are currently known by the courtesy titles Earl and Countess of Ulster. As Alexander is three generations removed from the crown he is not a prince. Upon his accession Claire would be styled Her Grace The Duchess of Gloucester.

Alexander and Claire’s only son Xan, born in 2007, is currently unmarried.

== Arms ==
Coat of Arms of Eleanor, the First Duchess of the Second Creation's family the House of De Bohun. Wife of Thomas of Woodstock.

Coat of Arms of Jacqueline, the First Duchess of the Second Creation's family the House of Wittelsbach. Wife of Humphrey of Lancaster.

Coat of Arms of Eleanor, the Second Duchess of the Second Creation's family the Cobham Family. Wife of Humphrey of Lancaster.

Coat of Arms of Anne, the First Duchess of the Third Creation. Wife of Richard, Duke of Gloucester.

Coat of Arms of Maria, the First Duchess of the Fourth Creation's family the Walpole Family. Wife of Prince William Henry, Duke of Gloucester and Edinburgh.

Coat of Arms of The Princess Mary, the Second Duchess of the Fourth Creation. Wife of Prince William Frederick, Duke of Gloucester and Edinburgh.

Coat of Arms of Alice, the First Duchess of the Fifth Creation. Wife of Prince Henry, Duke of Gloucester.

Coat of Arms of Birgitte, the Second Duchess of the Fifth Creation. Wife of Prince Richard, Duke of Gloucester.
