= Sophia of Hanover (disambiguation) =

Sophia of Hanover (1630–1714) was the electress consort of Ernest Augustus, Elector of Hanover, and the heir presumptive of England and Great Britain under the Act of Settlement 1701.

Sophia of Hanover may also refer to:

- Sophia Charlotte of Hanover (1668–1705), queen consort of Frederick I, King in Prussia
- Sophia Dorothea of Hanover (1687–1757), queen consort of Frederick William I, King in Prussia
- Princess Sophia of Gloucester (1773–1844), great-granddaughter of George II, King of Great Britain, and member of the House of Hanover by birth
- Princess Sophia of the United Kingdom (1777–1848), fifth daughter of George III and member of the House of Hanover by birth

== See also ==
- Sophia Dorothea of Celle (1666–1726), wife of George Louis, Electoral Prince of Hanover (later George I, King of Great Britain)
- Sophia von Kielmansegg, Countess of Darlington (1675–1725), illegitimate daughter of Ernest Augustus, Elector of Hanover
- Princess Augusta Sophia of the United Kingdom (1768–1840), second daughter of George III and member of the House of Hanover by birth
- Princess Sophia (disambiguation)
