= Thomas Sandby =

English painter (1721–1798)

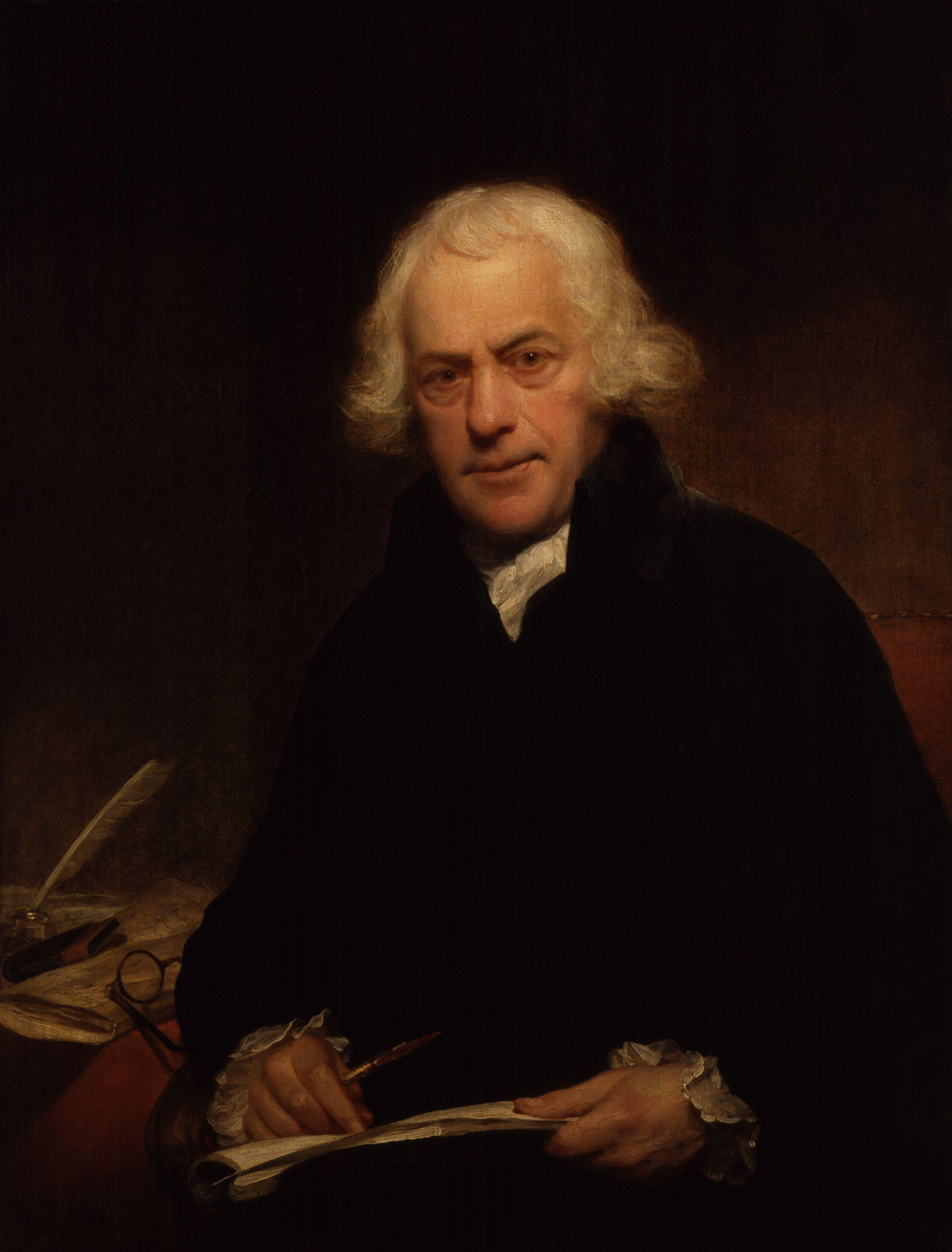
Portrait of Thomas Sandby by Sir William Beechey

Thomas Sandby RA (1721 – 25 June 1798) was an English draughtsman, watercolour artist, architect and teacher. In 1743 he was appointed private secretary to the Duke of Cumberland, who later appointed him Deputy Ranger of Windsor Great Park, where he was responsible for considerable landscaping work.

Along with his younger brother Paul, he was one of the founding members of the Royal Academy in 1768, and was its first professor of architecture. His most notable architectural work was the Freemason's Hall in London (now demolished).

== Life and work ==
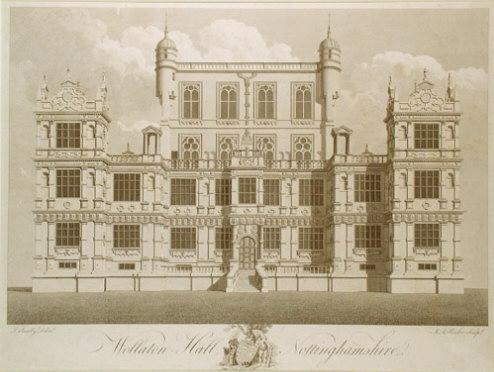
Wollaton Hall (Engraving by M A Rooker after a drawing by Sandby)

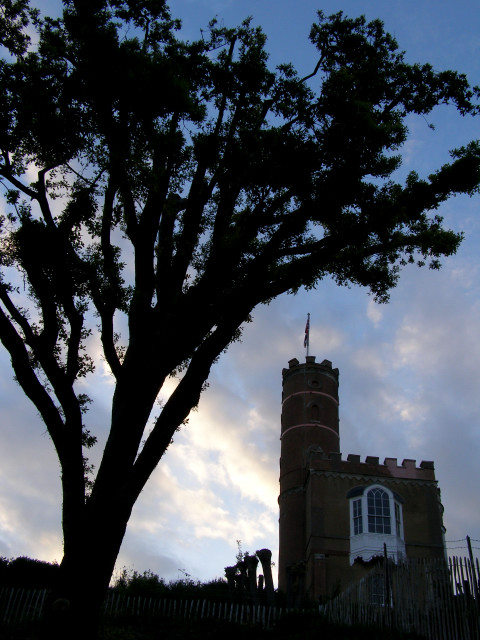
Luttrell's Tower, Calshot – designed by Thomas Sandby for T. S. Luttrell (c.1738–1803)

=== Early years ===
Sandby was born in Nottingham, the son of Thomas Sandby, a textile worker, and was self-taught as a draughtsman and architect. Paul Sandby was his brother.

According to the autobiography of the architect James Gandon, Thomas and his brother Paul ran a drawing academy in Nottingham before they went to London in 1741, to take up employment in the military drawing department at the Tower of London (a post procured for them by John Plumptre, MP for Nottingham). Another source says that Thomas initially went to London for the purpose of having one of his pictures – a view of Nottingham – engraved.

=== Employment by the Duke of Cumberland ===
In 1743 Sandby was appointed private secretary and draughtsman to William Augustus, Duke of Cumberland, and accompanied him in his campaigns in Flanders and Scotland (1743–1748). Sandby was at the Battle of Dettingen in 1743. Pasquin says that he was appointed draughtsman to the chief engineer of Scotland, in which capacity he was at Fort William in the highlands when Charles Edward Stuart, the Young Pretender, landed and was the first person to convey intelligence of the event to the government in 1745.

Sandby accompanied Cumberland in his expeditions against the rebels, and made a sketch of the Battle of Culloden, together with three panoramic views of Fort Augustus and the surrounding scenery, showing the encampments, in 1746, and a drawing of the triumphal arch erected in St. James's Park to commemorate the victories. In this year the Duke was appointed ranger of Windsor Great Park, and selected Sandby to be deputy ranger. Sandby again accompanied the Duke to the Netherlands during the War of the Austrian Succession, and probably remained there till the conclusion of the Treaty of Aix-la-Chapelle in October 1748. He drew four views of the camps in the Low Countries, covering extensive tracts of country, and another inscribed 'Abbaye près de Sarlouis'.

Sandby continued to draw a salary from the Board of Ordnance, and this, together with his appointment as deputy ranger of Windsor Great Park, which he held till his death, placed Sandby in a position of independence, and afforded scope for his talent both as an artist and as an architect. The Great Lodge (now known as Cumberland Lodge) was the residence of Duke and was enlarged under the supervision of Henry Flitcroft to whom Sandby was assistant. The lower lodge was occupied by Sandby. His time was now principally spent in extensive alterations of the park, and in the formation of the Virginia Water Lake, in which he was assisted by his younger brother, Paul, who came to live with him. In 1754, Thomas made eight drawings of the lake which were engraved on copper by Paul Sandby and other engravers and dedicated to the Duke of Cumberland. They were republished by John Boydell in 1772. George III, who took great interest in the undertaking, honoured Sandby with his confidence and personal friendship, and on the death of Cumberland in 1765, the king's brother, Henry Frederick (also Duke of Cumberland, and ranger of the park), retained Sandby as deputy.

=== Artist and professor of architecture ===
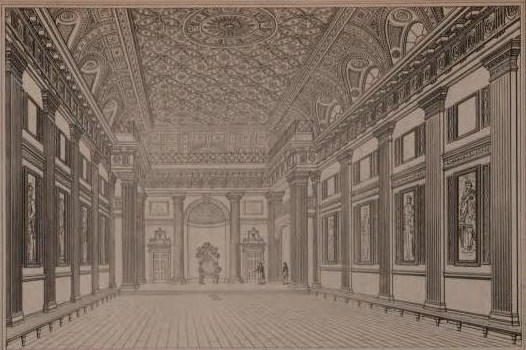
Grand Hall, Freemason's Hall, London (Designed by Thomas Sandby and built in 1776)

Although devoted to his work at Windsor and preferring a retired life, Sandby spent part of each year in London. He rented a house in Great Marlborough Street from 1760 to 1766. He was on the committee of the St. Martin's Lane Academy, which issued a pamphlet in 1755 proposing the formation of an academy of art, and he exhibited drawings at the Society of Artists' exhibition in 1767, and afterwards for some years at the Royal Academy. Both he and his brother Paul were among the 28 original members of the Royal Academy who were nominated by George III in 1768. He was elected Academy's first professor of architecture, delivering the first of a series of six lectures in that capacity on 8 October 1770. He continued these lectures with alterations and additions annually till his death. They were never published, but the manuscripts were held in the library of the Royal Institute of British Architects. The illustrations were sold with his other drawings after his death.

=== Architect ===
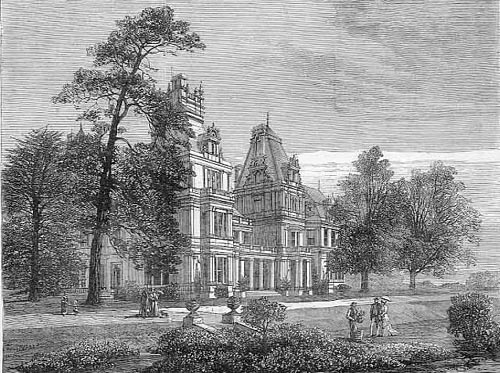
St. Leonard's Hill, Clewer (extended by Sandby in the late 1760s)

In February 1769 Sandby entered a competition to design the Royal Exchange at Dublin, winning third prize of £40. Perhaps his most notable architectural commission was the design of the (first) Freemason's Hall at Great Queen Street in central London, linking two houses purchased by the United Grand Lodge of England The building was opened with great ceremony on 23 May 1776, when the title of 'Grand Architect' was conferred on him by the Freemasons. The Hall was extended in the 1820s by Sir John Soane, but was demolished in 1930 after suffering irreparable structural damage in a fire in 1883.

Sandby designed a carved oak altar-screen for St. George's Chapel, Windsor Castle, and a stone bridge over the Thames at Staines, opened in 1796, but removed a few years afterwards on account of its insecurity. He built several houses in the neighbourhood of Windsor, including St Leonard's Hill for the Duchess of Gloucester, and one for a Colonel Deacon, later known as "Holly Grove". Designs exist for many others of his architectural works which cannot now be identified. In 1777 he was appointed, jointly with James Adam, architect of his majesty's works, and in 1780 master-carpenter of his majesty's works in England.

=== Family ===
Sandby was twice married. The name of his first wife is stated to have been Schultz. He married his second wife, Elizabeth Venables (1733–82), on 26 April 1753. She had a dowry of £2,000, and bore him ten children, six of whom (five daughters and one son) survived him. In his will, and in some simple verses addressed to his daughters after their mother's death, he named only four daughters, Harriott, Charlotte, Maria, and Ann, omitting his eldest girl, Elizabeth, who was twice married, and is said to have died in about 1809. His daughter Harriott married (1786) Thomas Paul, the second son of his brother Paul, and kept house for her father after her mother's death. Eight of her thirteen children were born at the deputy ranger's lodge.

=== Death ===
Sandby died at the deputy ranger's lodge in Windsor Park on Monday, 25 June 1798, and was buried in the churchyard of Old Windsor.

=== Legacy ===
Though few of his buildings remain standing today, his skill as an engineer and landscape-gardener Windsor Great Park and Virginia Water are a permanent record.
