= Sophia Matilda =

Sophia Matilda may refer to:

- Princess Sophia of the United Kingdom (1777–1848), daughter of King George III and Queen Charlotte
- Princess Sophia of Gloucester (1773–1844), niece of King George III
