= Sing Unto God (Handel) =

Anthem by George Frideric Handel

George Frideric Handel

Sing Unto God (also known as the Anthem for the Wedding of Frederick, Prince of Wales and Princess Augusta of Saxe-Gotha) (HWV 263), is an anthem composed by George Frideric Handel. It was performed for the royal wedding on 27 April 1736 at the Chapel Royal in St James's Palace, London with Francesca Cuzzoni-Sandoni, Carlo Broschi "Farinelli", and Francesco Bernardi "Senesino". The text was adapted from verses of Psalms 68, 106 and 128.

== Background ==
The wedding of the twenty-nine-year-old heir to the throne, Frederick, Prince of Wales to the seventeen-year-old Princess Augusta of Saxe-Gotha, who had arrived in England only two days earlier, was celebrated with great pomp. The press reported on the rehearsal of Handel's anthem:

Yesterday there was a Practice of a fine Anthem compos'd by Mr. Handel, to be performed at the Nuptials of the Prince of Wales, at Mr Gates's, Master of the Boys belonging to the Chapel Royal, St. James's; the Vocal Parts were perform'd by Mess. Row, Gates, Lee, Abbot, Beard, the Gentlemen of the Chapel, and the Boys. The Instrumental Parts by twenty of His Majesty's Band of Musick, and the same number of performers from Mr. Handel's opera.

The words of the anthem were published in the newspapers. The only comment on the music from someone who was present at the wedding that is known is from the diary of the Earl of Egmont: "Over the altar was placed the organ, and a gallery made for the musicians. An anthem composed for the occasion by Mr. Hendel was wretchedly sung..."

== Text and structure ==
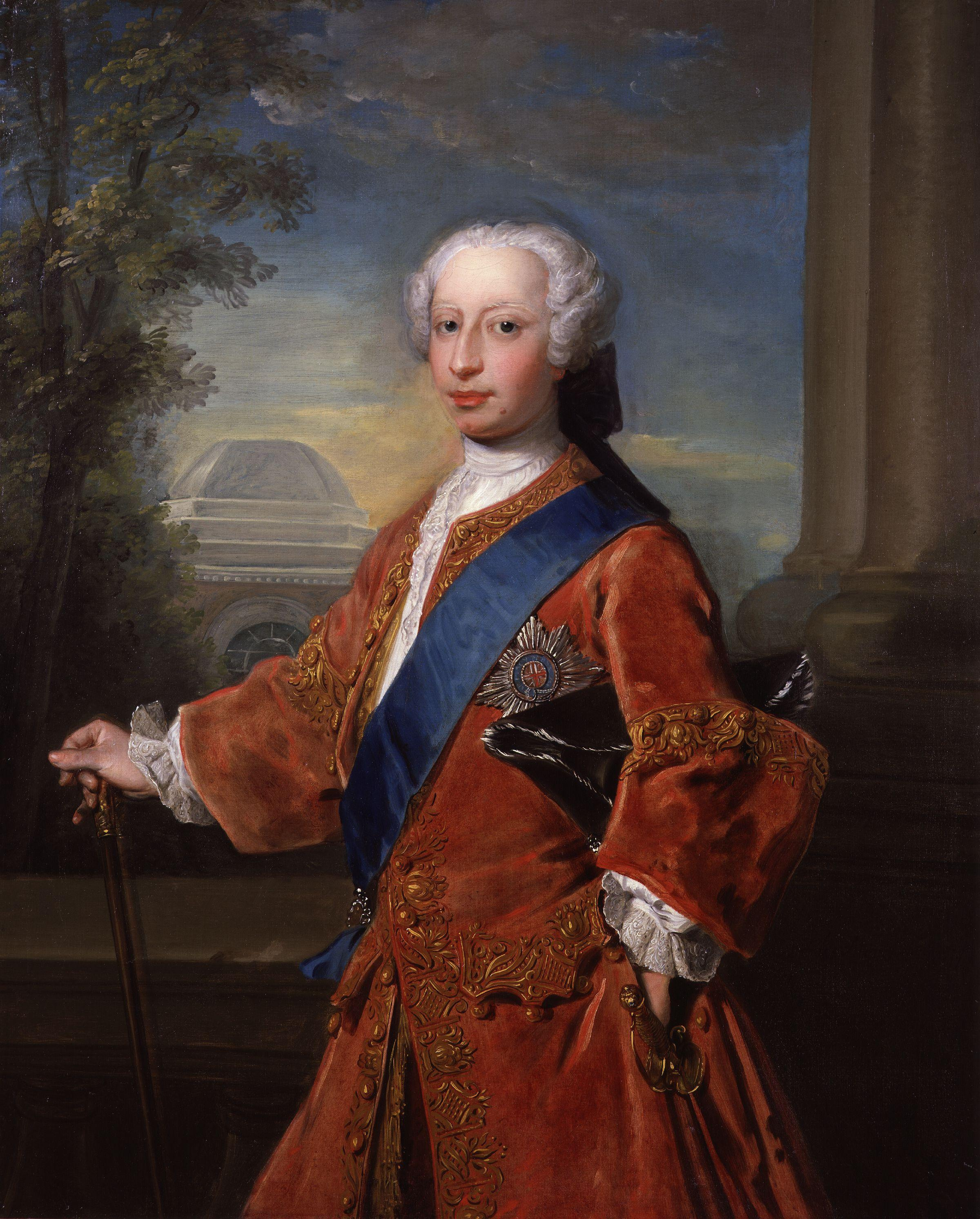
Frederick, Prince of Wales by Philip Mercier

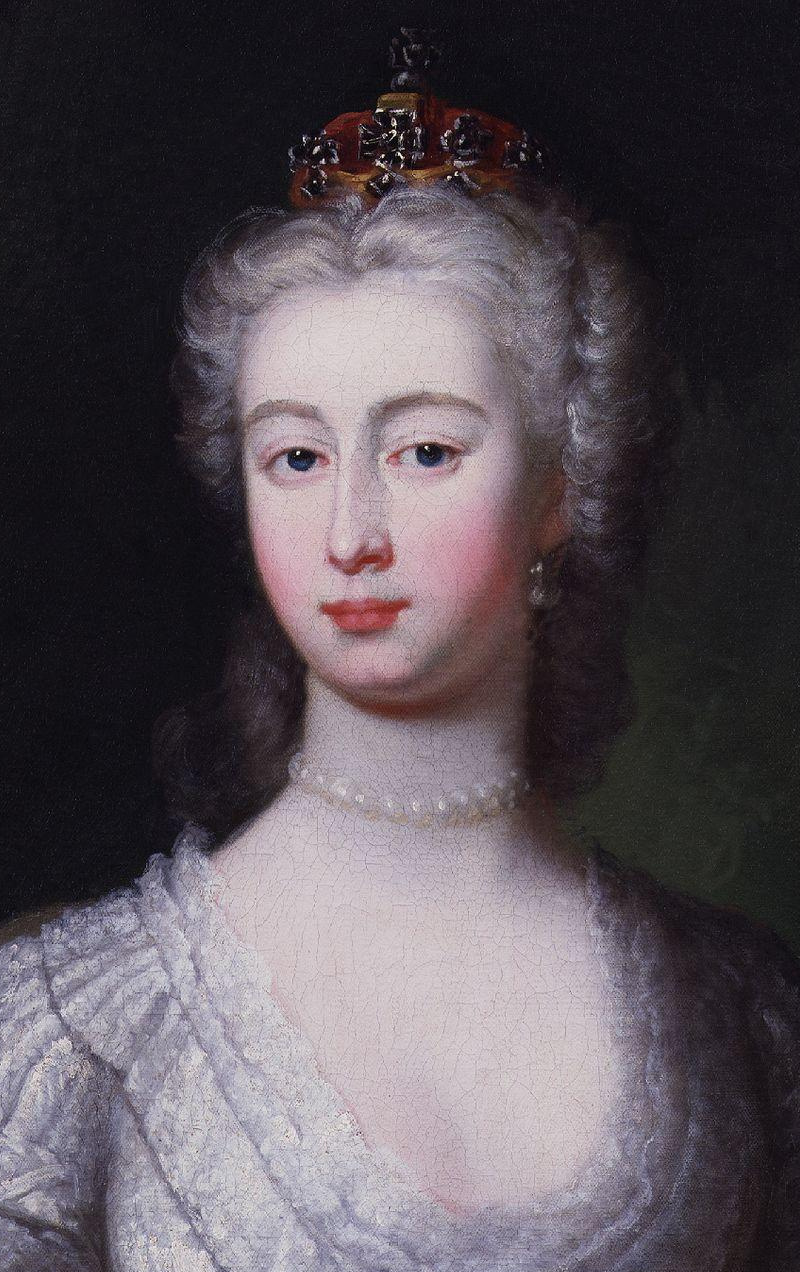
Augusta of Saxe-Gotha, Princess of Wales by Charles Philips

(Alto Soloist, Full Chorus, Orchestra including timpani and solo trumpeter)

Sing unto God, ye Kingdoms of the Earth
O sing Praises unto the Lord.

(Soprano soloist, orchestra)

Blessed are all they that fear the Lord:
O well is thee, and happy shalt thou be.

(Bass soloist, obbligato cello and orchestra)

Thy wife shall be as the fruitful vine
Upon the walls of thine house
Thy children like the olive branches
Round about thy table.

(Fugal chorus with orchestra)

Lo, thus shall the man be blessed
That feareth the Lord
Blessed shall he be
He shall be blessed.

(Tenor soloist, recitative with continuo instruments)

Blessed be the Lord God of Israel
From everlasting to everlasting.

(Tenor soloist, full chorus, orchestra including timpani and solo trumpeter)

And let all the people say
Hallelujah, amen.
Blessed be the lord, Hallelujah, amen.
Praise ye the Lord, Hallelujah, amen.
Blessed be the Lord
From everlasting to everlasting.
Amen, Hallelujah, amen.

== Recording ==
Gillian Fisher (soprano), James Bowman (countertenor), John Mark Ainsley(tenor), Michael George (bass), New College Choir Oxford, The King's Consort, Robert King (conductor). Hyperion Records CDA66315. Released 1989.
