= Frederick, Prince of Wales =

Heir apparent to George II of Great Britain (1707–1751)

Frederick
- Prince of Wales (more...)
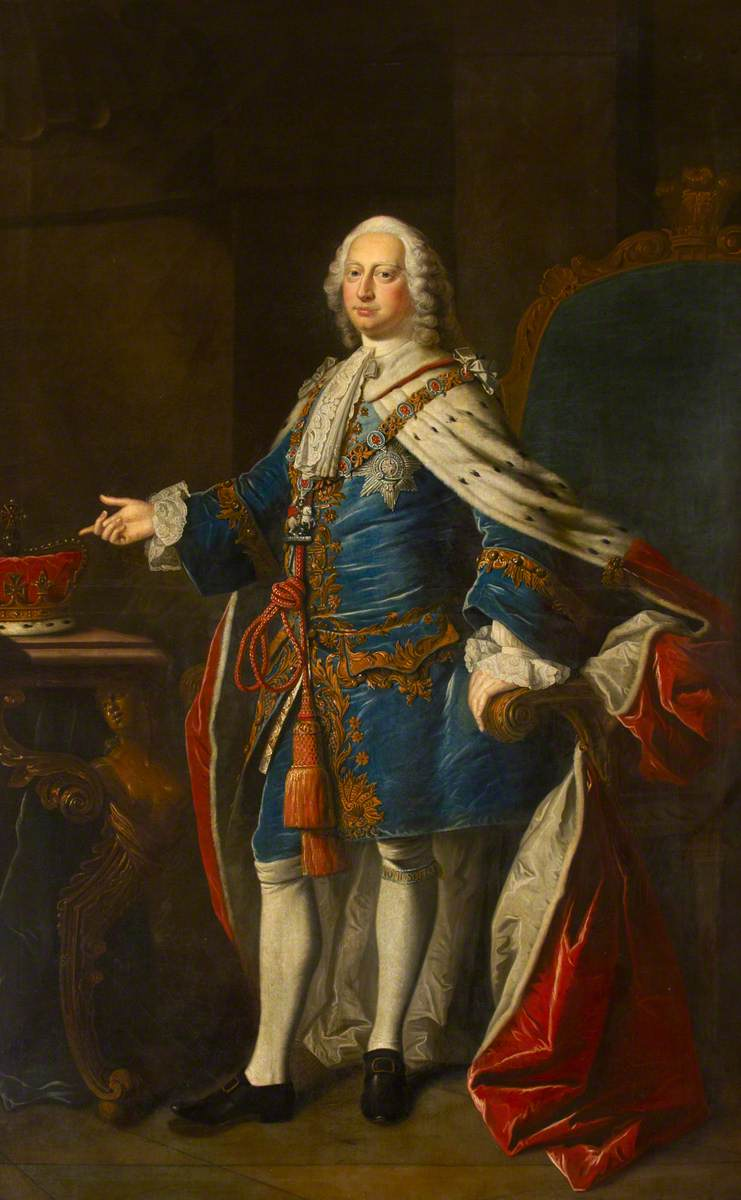
- Portrait by Thomas Hudson, 1750
- Born: 31 January 1707 (New Style); Electorate of Hanover, Holy Roman Empire (now Germany)
- Died: 31 March 1751 (aged 44); Leicester House, Westminster, England
- Burial: 13 April 1751; Westminster Abbey, London
- Spouse: Princess Augusta of Saxe-Gotha (m. 1736)
- Issue: Augusta, Duchess of Brunswick-Wolfenbuttel; George III; Prince Edward, Duke of York and Albany; Princess Elizabeth; Prince William Henry, Duke of Gloucester and Edinburgh; Prince Henry, Duke of Cumberland and Strathearn; Princess Louisa; Prince Frederick; Caroline Matilda, Queen of Denmark and Norway
Names
- Frederick Louis; German: Friedrich Ludwig
- House: Hanover
- Father: George II of Great Britain
- Mother: Caroline of Ansbach

Frederick, Prince of Wales (Frederick Louis or Frederick Lewis, German: Friedrich Ludwig; 31 January 1707 – 31 March 1751), was the eldest son and heir apparent of King George II of Great Britain. He grew estranged from his parents, King George and Queen Caroline. Frederick was the father of King George III.

Under the Act of Settlement passed by the English Parliament in 1701, Frederick was fourth in the line of succession to the British throne at birth, after his great-grandmother Electress Sophia of Hanover; his grandfather George, Prince-Elector of Hanover; and his father, George. The Elector ascended the British throne in 1714. After his paternal grandfather died and his father became king in 1727, Frederick moved to Great Britain and was created Prince of Wales in 1729. He predeceased his father and upon the latter's death in 1760, the throne passed to Frederick's eldest son, George III. He is the most recent Prince of Wales to not accede to the throne.

== Early life ==
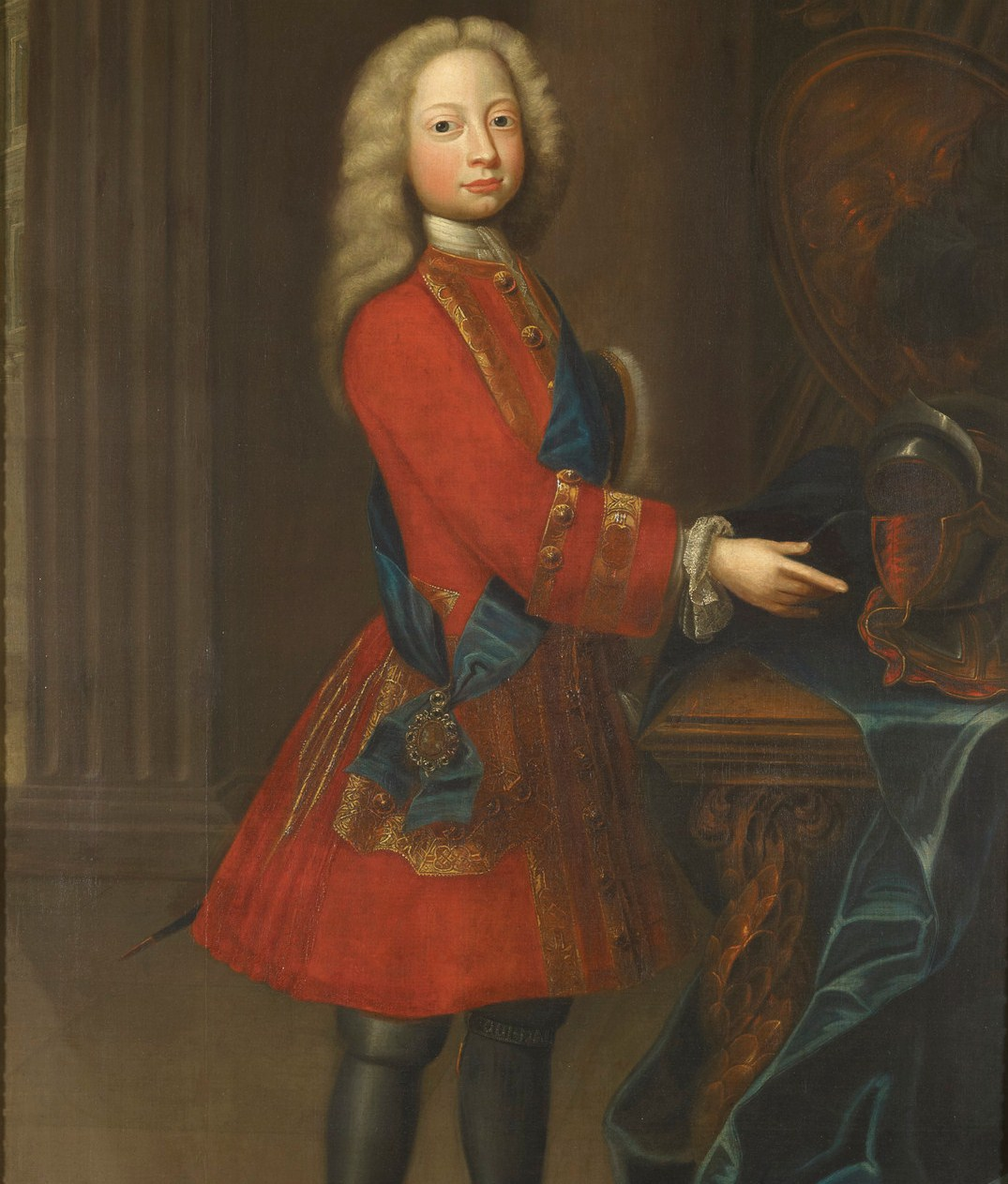
Prince Frederick, c. 1720

Frederick was born on 31 January 1707 [O.S. 20 January 1706] in Hanover, Holy Roman Empire (Germany), as Duke Friedrich Ludwig of Brunswick-Lüneburg, to Caroline of Ansbach and Prince George, son of George, Elector of Hanover (who was also one of Frederick's two godfathers). The Elector was the son of Sophia of Hanover, who was heir presumptive to Queen Anne of Great Britain. However, in June 1714, Sophia died at the age of 83 before Anne, which elevated the Elector to heir presumptive. Queen Anne died on 1 August the same year, so the Elector became King George I. This made Frederick's father first-in-line to the British throne and Frederick himself second-in-line. Frederick's other godfather was his granduncle Frederick I, King in Prussia and Elector of Brandenburg-Prussia. Within the family, Frederick was nicknamed "Griff".

In the year of Anne's death and the coronation of George I, Frederick's parents, George, Prince of Wales (later George II), and Caroline of Ansbach, were called upon to leave Hanover for Great Britain when Frederick was only 7 years old. He was left in the care of his granduncle Ernest Augustus, Prince-Bishop of Osnabrück, and did not see his parents again for 14 years.

In 1722, Frederick was inoculated against smallpox by Charles Maitland on the instructions of his mother, Caroline. His grandfather George I created him Duke of Edinburgh, Marquess of the Isle of Ely, Earl of Eltham in the county of Kent, Viscount of Launceston in the county of Cornwall, and Baron of Snaudon in the county of Carnarvon, on 26 July 1726. The latter two titles have been interpreted differently since: the ofs are omitted and Snaudon rendered as Snowdon.

Frederick arrived in Great Britain in 1728, the year after his father had become King George II. By then, George and Caroline had several younger children, and Frederick was a high-spirited young man fond of drinking, gambling and women. The long separation had damaged the relationship with his parents, and they would never be close to him. That year also saw the foundation of Fredericksburg, Virginia, which was named after him.

== Prince of Wales ==
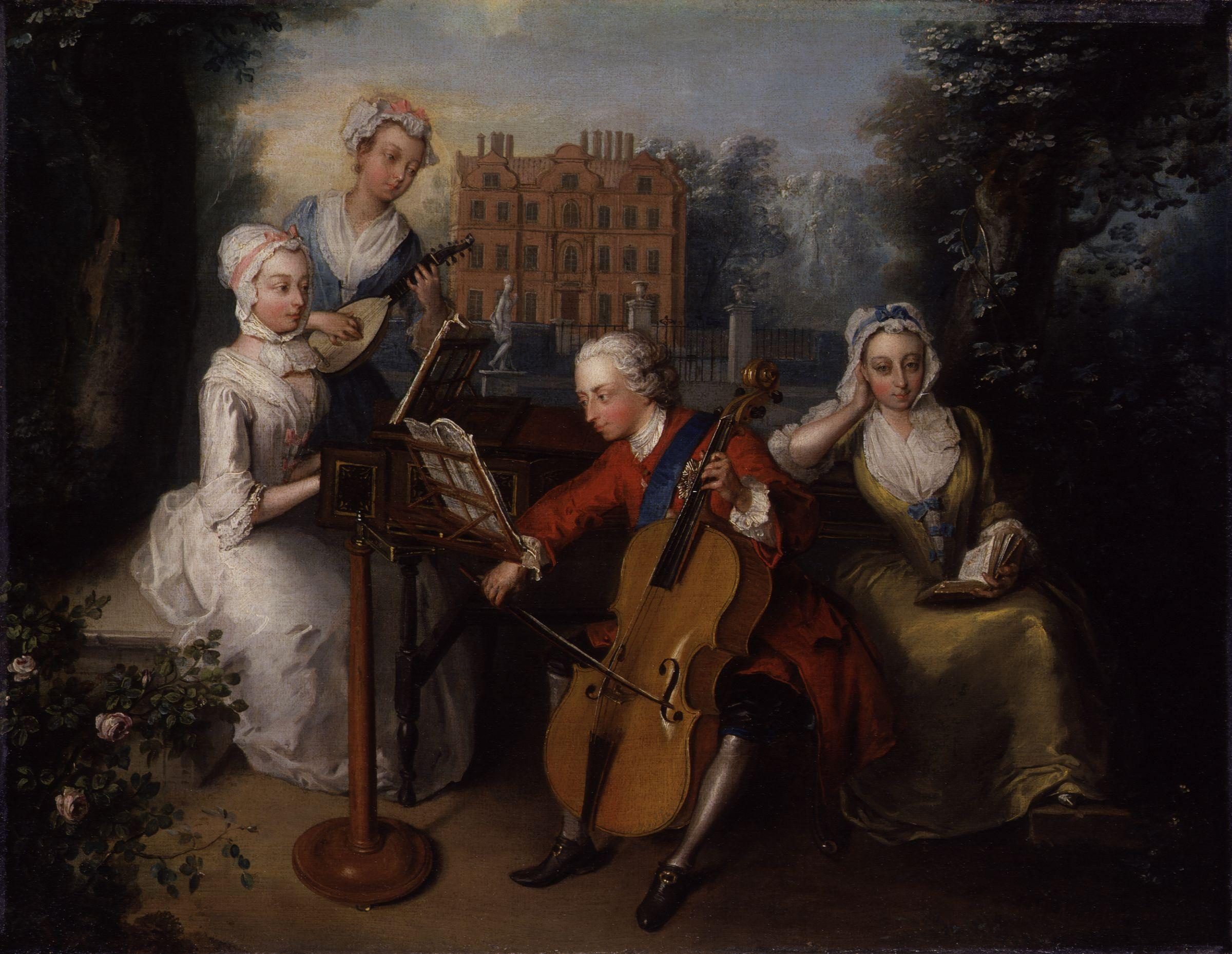
The Music Party by Philippe Mercier, 1733. The Prince of Wales with his sisters Anne, Caroline and Amelia

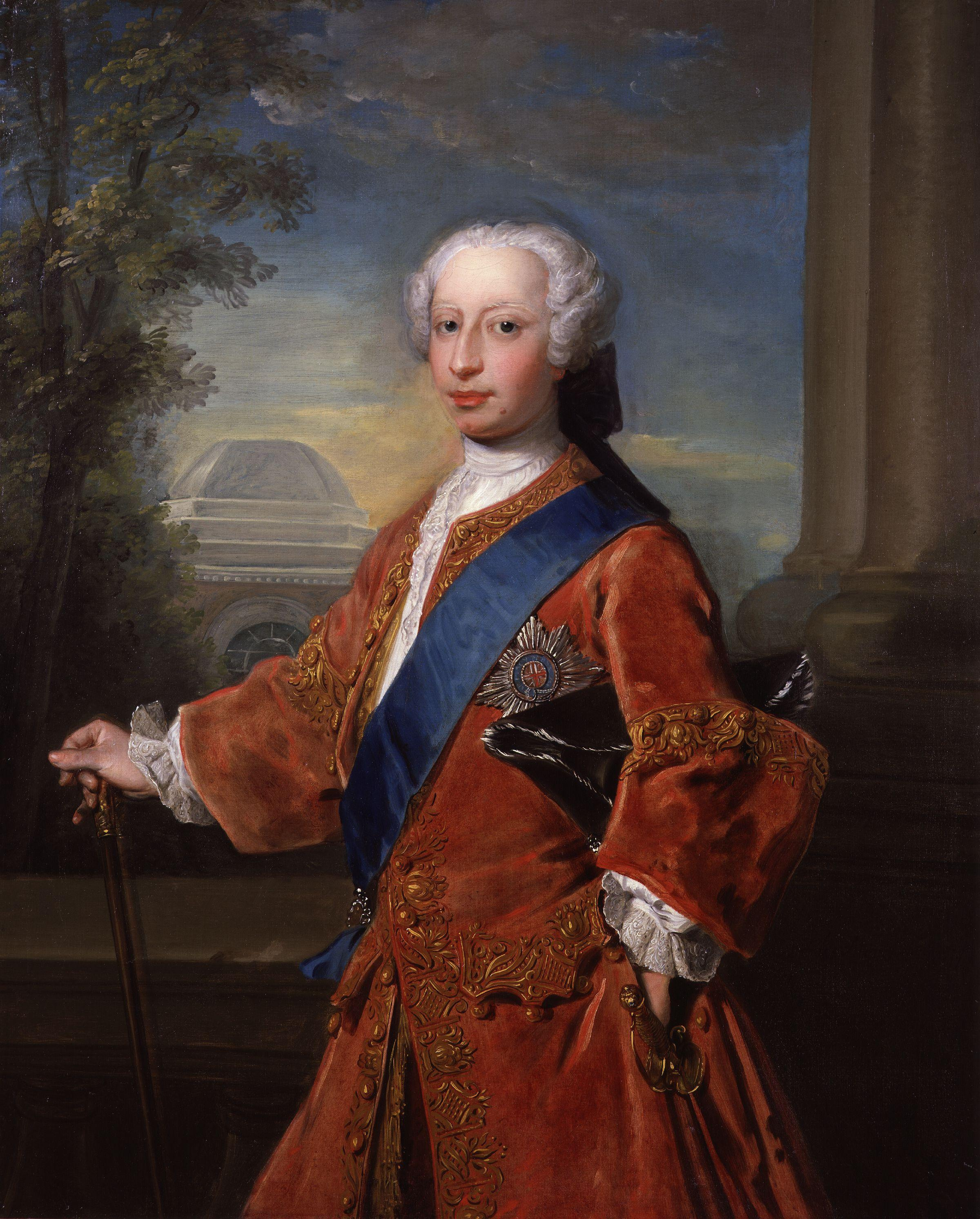
Portrait by Philippe Mercier, 1736

The motives for the ill-feeling between Frederick and his parents may have included the fact that he had been set up by his grandfather, even as a small child, as the representative of the House of Hanover, and was used to presiding over official occasions in the absence of his parents. He was not permitted to go to Great Britain until after his father took the throne as George II on 11 June 1727. Frederick had continued to be known as Prince Friedrich Ludwig of Hanover (with his British HRH style) even after his father had been created Prince of Wales.

Frederick was created Prince of Wales on 7 January 1729. He served as the tenth chancellor of the University of Dublin from 1728 to 1751, and a portrait of him still enjoys a commanding position in the Hall of Trinity College Dublin.

Once established in London, Frederick sponsored a court of 'opposition' politicians. They supported the Opera of the Nobility in Lincoln's Inn Fields as a rival to George Frideric Handel's royally sponsored opera at the King's Theatre in the Haymarket. His circle also backed opposition journalism and historiography: under the patronage of Chesterfield and George Bubb Dodington, the Country-Whig paper Old England; or, the Constitutional Journal was paired with two large histories—William Guthrie’s A General History of England (to 1688) and James Ralph’s The History of England, During the Reigns of King William, Queen Anne, and King George I (1744–46). Frederick was a lover of music who played the viola and cello; he is depicted playing a cello in three portraits by Philippe Mercier of Frederick and his sisters. He enjoyed the natural sciences and the arts, and became a thorn in the side of his parents, making a point of opposing them in everything, according to the court gossip Lord Hervey. At court, the favourite of George II and Queen Caroline was Frederick's younger brother, Prince William, Duke of Cumberland, to the extent that the king looked into ways of splitting his domains so that Frederick would succeed only in Britain, while Hanover would go to William.

Hervey and Frederick (using a pseudonym "Captain Bodkin") wrote a theatrical comedy which was staged at the Drury Lane Theatre in October 1731. It was panned by the critics, and even the theatre's manager thought it so bad that it was unlikely to play out even the first night. He had soldiers stationed in the audience to maintain order, and when the play flopped, the audience were given their money back. Hervey and Frederick also shared a mistress, Anne Vane, who had a son called FitzFrederick Vane in June 1732. Either of them or William Stanhope, 1st Earl of Harrington, another of her lovers, could have been the father. Jealousy between Frederick and Hervey may have contributed to a breach, and their friendship ended. Hervey later wrote bitterly that Frederick was "false ... never having the least hesitation in telling any lie that served his present purpose."

== Patron of the arts ==
A permanent result of Frederick's patronage of the arts is "Rule, Britannia!", one of the best-known British patriotic songs. It was composed by the English composer Thomas Arne with words written by the Scottish poet and playwright James Thomson as part of the masque Alfred, which was first performed on 1 August 1740 at Cliveden. Thomas Arne was also one of Frederick's favourite artists. A masque linking the prince with both the Saxon hero-king Alfred the Great's victories over the Vikings and with the contemporary issue of building up British sea power accorded well with Frederick's political plans and aspirations. Later, the song gained a life of its own outside of the masque. Thomson, who supported the Prince of Wales politically, also dedicated an earlier work dedicated to him: Liberty (1734).

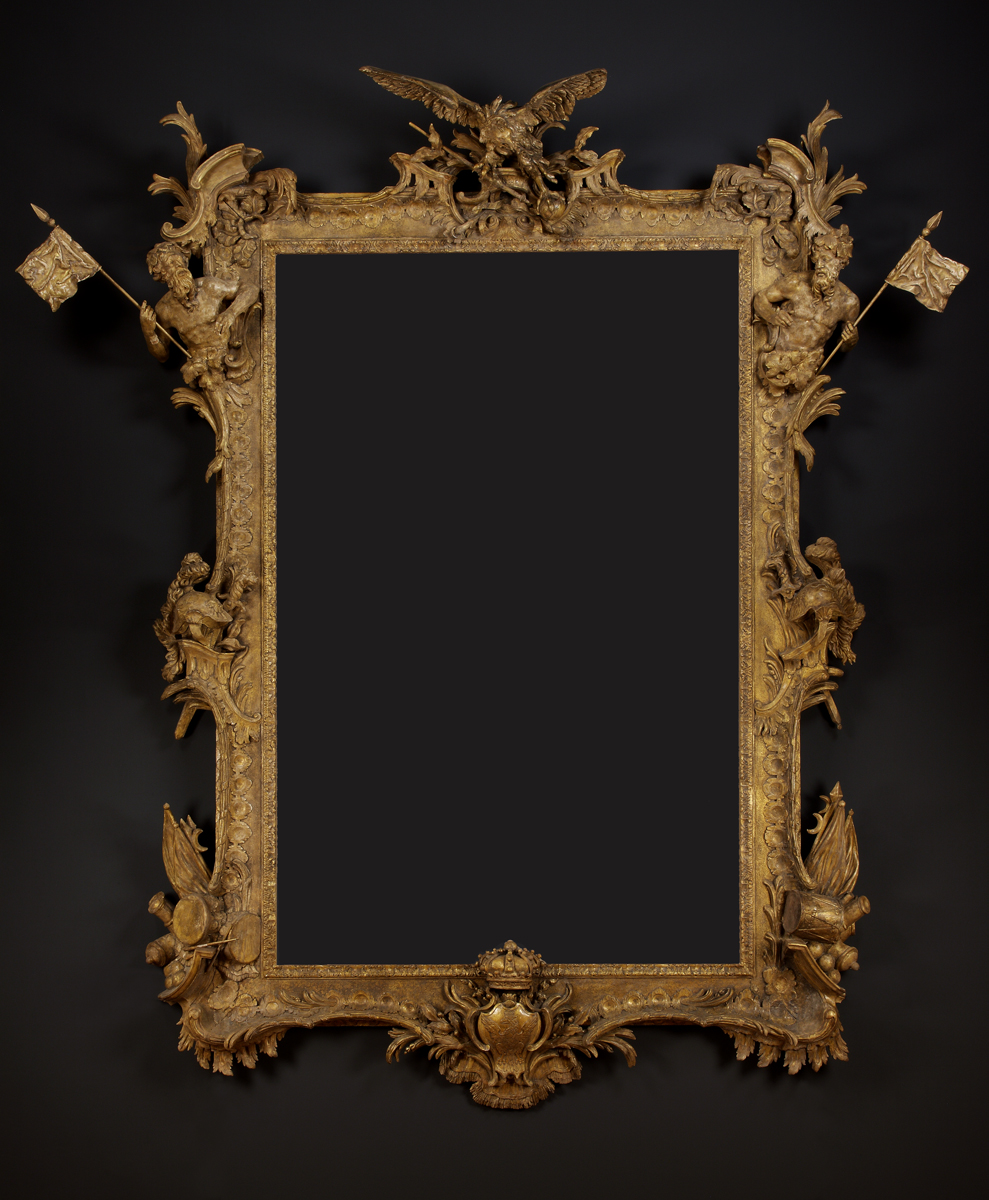
A Royal Giltwood Frame of Colossal Scale by Paul Petit made at the command of Frederick, Prince of Wales to contain a portrait of Frederick the Great by Antoine Pesne (1683–1757). Collection of Carlton Hobbs LLC.

Unlike the king, Frederick was a knowledgeable amateur of painting, patronising immigrant artists such as Jacopo Amigoni and Jean-Baptiste van Loo, who painted the portraits of the prince and his consort for Frederick's champion William Pulteney, 1st Earl of Bath. The list of other artists whom he employed—Philippe Mercier, John Wootton, George Knapton, and the engraver Joseph Goupy—includes some of the principal painters of the English Rococo. The prince was also crucially important in furthering the popularity of the Rococo style in the decorative arts, with a clear predilection for French Huguenot craftsmen. He patronised silversmiths such as Nicolas Sprimont (1713–1771), "toyshop" owners such as Paul Bertrand, and also carvers and gilders. The most notable of the latter was Paul Petit (1729–c. 1756) who first worked for the prince on William Kent's neo-Palladian state barge of 1732, which is still preserved in the National Maritime Museum. Petit worked on a handful of magnificent trophy frames in the Rococo style for Frederick, which are among the most significant remaining testaments to the prince's patronage of the decorative arts. One frame, made in 1748 for his namesake cousin Frederick the Great of Prussia, was especially lavish and represented the esteem in which the prince held his cousin. This suggests the prince identified with Frederick the Great's style of enlightened rule, more than that of his own father George II. Petit's frame contained a portrait of Frederick the Great painted by Antoine Pesne, and remains today in the British Royal Collection.

None of Frederick's homes are now left standing except for the country residence of Cliveden, which is in a much altered state. His London residences (Norfolk House, Carlton House, Leicester House, and Kew House or the White House) have all been demolished.

== Domestic life ==
Negotiations between George II and his first cousin and brother-in-law Frederick William I of Prussia on a proposed marriage between the Prince of Wales and Frederick William's daughter Wilhelmine were welcomed by Frederick even though the couple had never met. George II was not keen on the proposal but continued talks for diplomatic reasons. Frustrated by the delay, Frederick sent an envoy of his own to the Prussian court. When George II discovered the plan, he immediately arranged for Frederick to leave Hanover for England. The marriage negotiations floundered when Frederick William demanded that Frederick be made Regent in Hanover.

Frederick also almost married Lady Diana Spencer, daughter of Charles Spencer, 3rd Earl of Sunderland and Lady Anne Churchill. Lady Diana was the favourite grandchild of the powerful Sarah, Duchess of Marlborough. The duchess sought a royal alliance by marrying Lady Diana to the Prince of Wales with a massive dowry of £100,000. The prince, who was in great debt, agreed to the proposal, but the plan was vetoed by Robert Walpole and the king. Lady Diana soon married John Russell, 4th Duke of Bedford.

Although in his youth he was a spendthrift and womaniser, Frederick settled down following his marriage to the sixteen-year-old Augusta of Saxe-Gotha on 27 April 1736. The wedding was held at the Chapel Royal at St James's Palace in London, presided over by Edmund Gibson, Bishop of London and Dean of the Chapel Royal. Handel provided the new anthem 'Sing unto God' for the service, and the wedding was also marked in London by two rival operas, Handel's Atalanta and Porpora's La festa d'Imeneo.

In May 1736, George II returned to Hanover, which was unpopular in England. A satirical notice was pinned to the gates of St James's Palace decrying his absence: "Lost or strayed out of this house", it read, "a man who has left a wife and six children on the parish." The King made plans to return, in the face of inclement weather; when his ship was caught in a storm, gossip swept London that he had drowned. Eventually, in January 1737, he arrived back in England. Immediately he fell ill, with piles and a fever, and withdrew to his bed. The Prince of Wales put it about that the King was dying, with the result that George insisted on getting up and attending a social event to disprove the gossip-mongers.

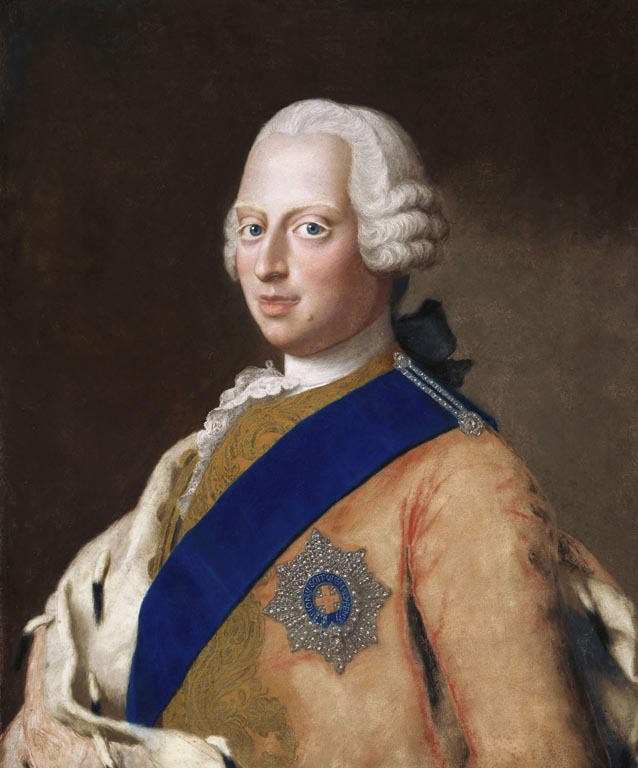
Frederick (pictured) opposed his father's government.

Quickly accumulating large debts, Frederick relied for an income on his wealthy friend George Bubb Dodington. Frederick's father had refused to meet his request for an increased financial allowance. Frederick's public opposition to his father's government continued; he opposed the unpopular Gin Act 1736, which tried to control the Gin Craze. Frederick applied to Parliament for an increased financial allowance, and public disagreement over the payment of the money drove a further wedge between parents and son. Frederick's allowance was raised, but by less than he had asked for.

In June 1737, Frederick informed his parents that Augusta was pregnant, and was due to give birth in October. Traditionally, royal births were witnessed by members of the family and senior courtiers to guard against supposititious children. But in fact, Augusta's due date was earlier. When she went into labour in July, the Prince sneaked her out of Hampton Court Palace in the middle of the night and forced her to ride 21 kilometres (13 mi) in a rattling carriage to St James's Palace, so that the King and Queen could not be present at the birth. When they learned of the Prince's action, George and Caroline were horrified. With a party including two of her daughters and Lord Hervey, the Queen rushed to St James. There, Caroline was relieved to discover that Augusta had given birth to a "poor, ugly little she-mouse" rather than a "large, fat, healthy boy". That made a supposititious child unlikely, since the baby was so pitiful. The circumstances of the birth deepened the estrangement between mother and son.

Frederick was banished from the king's court, and a rival court grew up at Frederick's new residence, Leicester House, where his father and mother had themselves lived after becoming estranged from George I. His mother fell fatally ill at the end of the year, but the king refused Frederick permission to see her. Frederick became a devoted family man, taking his wife and children to live in the countryside at Cliveden, where he fished, shot, and rowed. In 1742, Robert Walpole left office, and the realignment of the government led to a reconciliation between father and son, as Frederick's friends in Parliament gained influence.

After the Jacobite Rising of 1745, Frederick met Flora MacDonald, who had been imprisoned in the Tower of London for aiding the escape of the Rising's leader Charles Edward Stuart, and helped to secure her eventual release. In 1747, Frederick rejoined the political opposition, and the king responded by dissolving Parliament. In the subsequent early general election, Frederick's allies lost.

== Cricket ==
By the time Frederick arrived in Great Britain, cricket had developed into the country's most popular team sport, and it thrived on gambling. Perhaps because he wished to anglicise and so fit in with society, Frederick developed an academic interest in cricket and soon became a genuine enthusiast. He began to make wagers and then to patronise and play the sport, even forming his own team on several occasions.

The earliest mention of Frederick in cricket annals is in a contemporary report of a match on 28 September 1731 between Surrey and London, played on Kennington Common. No post-match report was found despite advance promotion as "likely to be the best performance of this kind that has been seen for some time". The records show that "for the convenience of the gamesters, the ground is to be staked and roped out" – a new practice in 1731 and possibly done partly for the benefit of a royal visitor. The advertisement refers to "the whole county of Surrey" as London's opponents and states that the Prince of Wales is "expected to attend".

In August 1732, the Whitehall Evening Post reported that Frederick attended "a great cricket match" at Kew on 27 July.

By the 1733 season, Frederick was seriously involved in the game, in effect as a county cricketer for Surrey. He was said to have given a guinea to each player in a Surrey vs. Middlesex game at Moulsey Hurst. Then he awarded a silver cup to a combined Surrey & Middlesex team, whose players had just beaten Kent, arguably the best county team at the time, at Moulsey Hurst on 1 August. This is the first reference in cricket history to any kind of trophy (other than hard cash) being contested. On 31 August, the Prince of Wales XI played Sir William Gage's XI on Moulsey Hurst. The result is unknown but the teams were said to be of county standard, so presumably it was in effect a Surrey vs. Sussex match.

In the years following 1733, there are frequent references to the Prince of Wales as a patron of cricket and as an occasional player.

When he died on 31 March 1751, cricket suffered a double blow as his death closely followed that of Charles Lennox, 2nd Duke of Richmond, the game's greatest financial patron at the time. The number of important matches declined for several years.

== Death ==
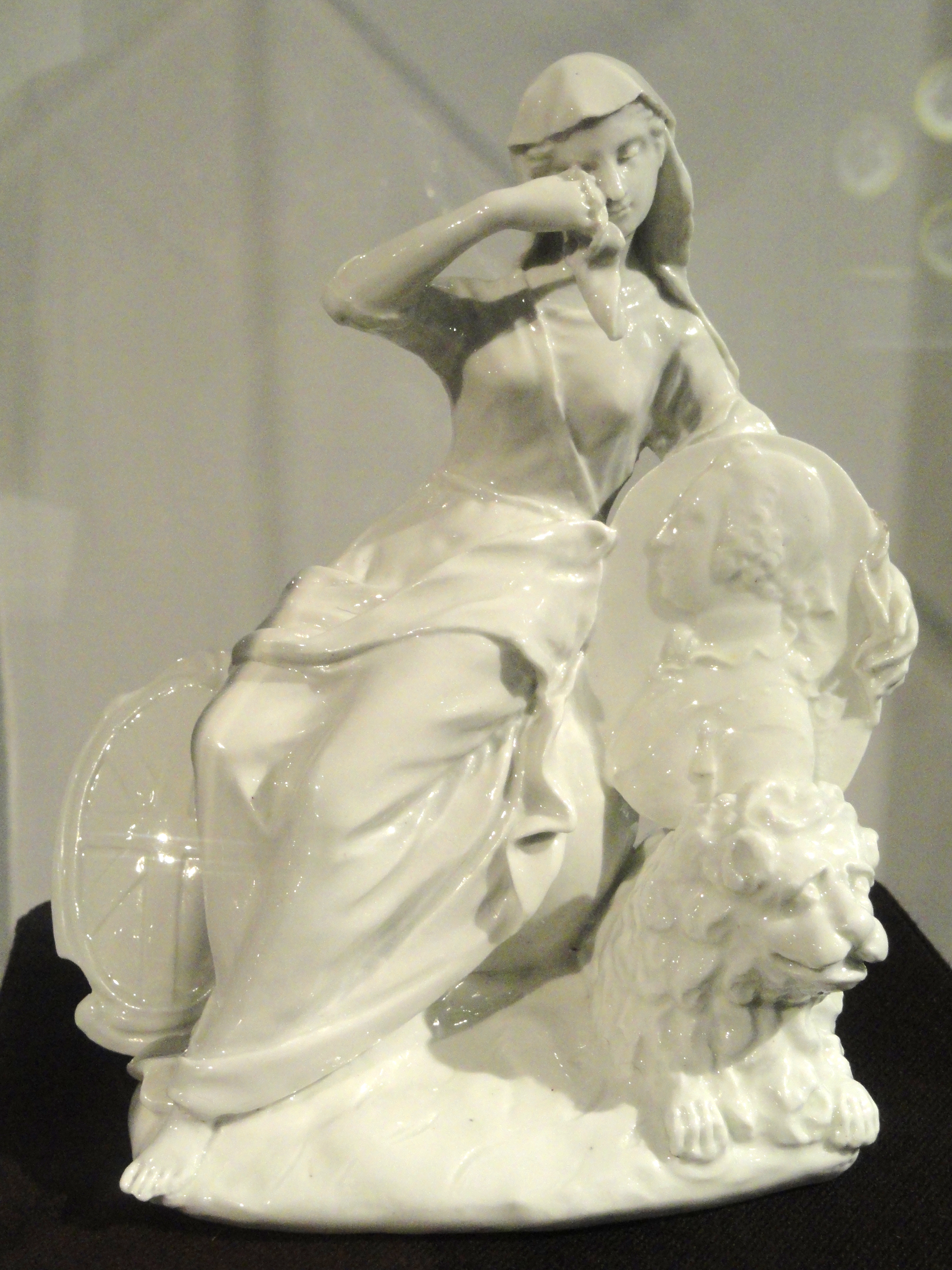
Britannia mourning the death of the Prince of Wales, c. 1751

His political ambitions unfulfilled, Frederick died at Leicester House at the age of 44 on 31 March 1751 (20 March OS). This had once been attributed to a burst lung abscess caused by a blow from a cricket or a real tennis ball, but as of 2016 it is thought to have been from a pulmonary embolism. He was buried at Westminster Abbey on 13 April 1751. He is the most recent Prince of Wales not to have acceded to the British throne.

The Prince of Wales's epigram (quoted by William Makepeace Thackeray, "Four Georges"):

"Here lies poor Fred who was alive and is dead,
Had it been his father I had much rather,
Had it been his sister nobody would have missed her,
Had it been his brother, still better than another,
Had it been the whole generation, so much better for the nation,
But since it is Fred who was alive and is dead,
There is no more to be said!"

Three months after his death, on 22 July, Augusta gave birth to their last child, Princess Caroline Matilda, who would later marry King Christian VII of Denmark–Norway.

== Titles, honours and arms ==
=== British titles ===
He was given the title Duke of Gloucester on 10 January 1717, but when he was raised to the peerage on 26 July 1726 it was as Duke of Edinburgh. He became Duke of Cornwall on 11 June 1727 and Prince of Wales on 7 January 1729.

=== Honours ===
- 3 July 1717: Royal Knight Companion of the Garter

=== Arms ===
Between his creation as Duke of Edinburgh in 1726 and his creation as Prince of Wales, he bore the arms of the kingdom, differentiated by a label argent of three points, the centre point bearing a cross gules. As Prince of Wales, the difference changed to simply a label argent of three points. Frederick never succeeded his father as Arch-Treasurer of the Holy Roman Empire and so the red escutcheon in the centre of his Hanover quarter is empty.

Arms of Frederick, Prince of Wales

== Family ==
=== Ancestors ===
Ancestors of Frederick, Prince of Wales

8. Ernest Augustus, Elector of Hanover
4. George I of Great Britain
9. Princess Sophia of the Palatinate
2. George II of Great Britain
10. George William, Duke of Brunswick
5. Duchess Sophia Dorothea of Brunswick-Celle
11. Éléonore Desmier d'Olbreuse
1. Frederick, Prince of Wales
12. Albert II of Brandenburg-Ansbach
6. John Frederick, Margrave of Brandenburg-Ansbach
13. Countess Sophie Margarete of Oettingen-Oettingen
3. Princess Caroline of Brandenburg-Ansbach
14. John George I of Saxe-Eisenach
7. Princess Eleonore Erdmuthe of Saxe-Eisenach
15. Johannetta, Countess of Sayn-Altenkirchen

=== Issue ===
Name	Birth	Death	Notes
By The Honourable Anne Vane
FitzFrederick Cornwall Vane	4 June 1732	23 February 1736	Born on St James's Street and baptised on 17 June 1732 with The Honourable Henry Vane (his maternal uncle), Charles Calvert, 5th Baron Baltimore and Lady Elizabeth Mansel as his godparents. He died in London of "a fit of convulsions" while in the care of his uncle Henry.
Amelia Vane	21 April 1733	22 April 1733	Died the day after her birth.
By Margaret, Countess of Marsac reputed
Charles	1736	22 December 1820	Died aged 84.
By Princess Augusta of Saxe-Gotha
Princess Augusta	31 July 1737	23 March 1813	Married, 1764, Charles William Ferdinand, Duke of Brunswick-Wolfenbüttel; had issue.
George III	4 June 1738	29 January 1820	Married, 1761, Charlotte of Mecklenburg-Strelitz; had issue, including George IV and William IV.
Prince Edward, Duke of York and Albany	25 March 1739	17 September 1767	Died aged 28, unmarried.
Princess Elizabeth	10 January 1741	4 September 1759	Died aged 18, unmarried.
Prince William Henry, Duke of Gloucester and Edinburgh	25 November 1743	25 August 1805	Married, 1766, Maria Waldegrave, Dowager Countess Waldegrave; had issue.
Prince Henry, Duke of Cumberland and Strathearn	7 November 1745	18 September 1790	Married, 1771, Anne Horton; no issue.
Princess Louisa	19 March 1749	13 May 1768	Died aged 19, unmarried.
Prince Frederick	13 May 1750	29 December 1765	Died aged 15, unmarried.
Princess Caroline Matilda	11 July 1751	10 May 1775	Born posthumously; Married, 1766, Christian VII of Denmark and Norway; had issue.

Frederick, Prince of Wales House of Hanover Cadet branch of the House of Welf Born: 1 February 1707 Died: 31 March 1751
Royal titles
Preceded by George (II)	Duke of Cornwall; Duke of Rothesay; 1727–1751	Vacant Title next held by George (IV)
Preceded by George (II)	Prince of Wales; 1729–1751	Succeeded by George (III)
New creation	Duke of Edinburgh; 1st creation 1726–1751	Succeeded by George (III)
Academic offices
Preceded by The Prince of Wales	Chancellor of the University of Dublin; 1728–1751	Succeeded by The Duke of Cumberland
