= Princess Sophia of Gloucester =

British princess (1773–1844)

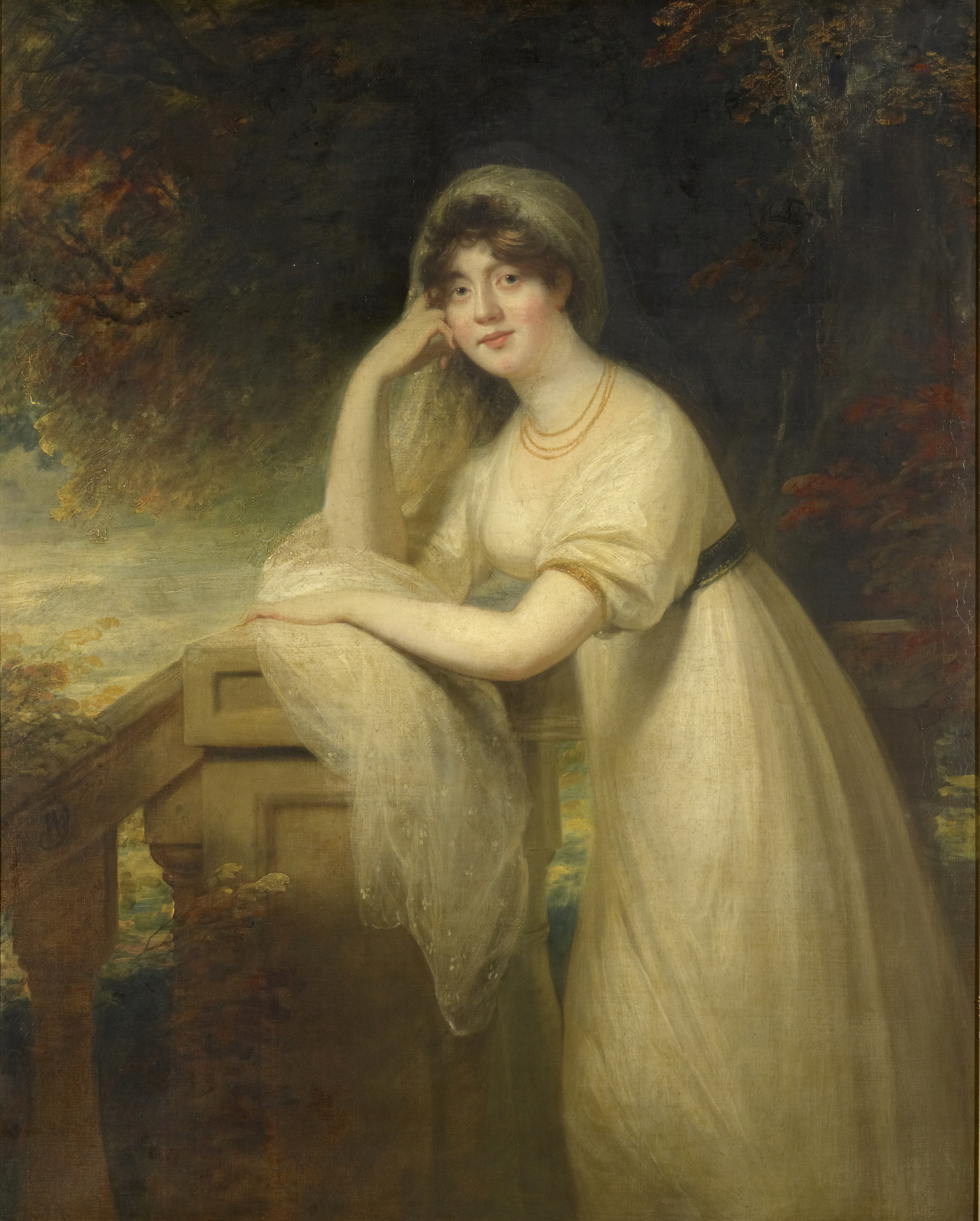
- Portrait by Sir William Beechey, c. 1803-5
- Born: 29 May 1773; Grosvenor Street, Mayfair, Middlesex
- Died: 29 November 1844 (aged 71); Blackheath, Kent
- Burial: 10 December 1844; St George's Chapel, Windsor Castle
Names
- Sophia Matilda
- House: Hanover
- Father: Prince William Henry, Duke of Gloucester and Edinburgh
- Mother: Maria Walpole

Princess Sophia of Gloucester (Sophia Matilda; 29 May 1773 – 29 November 1844) was a great-granddaughter of King George II of Great Britain and niece of King George III.

== Life ==
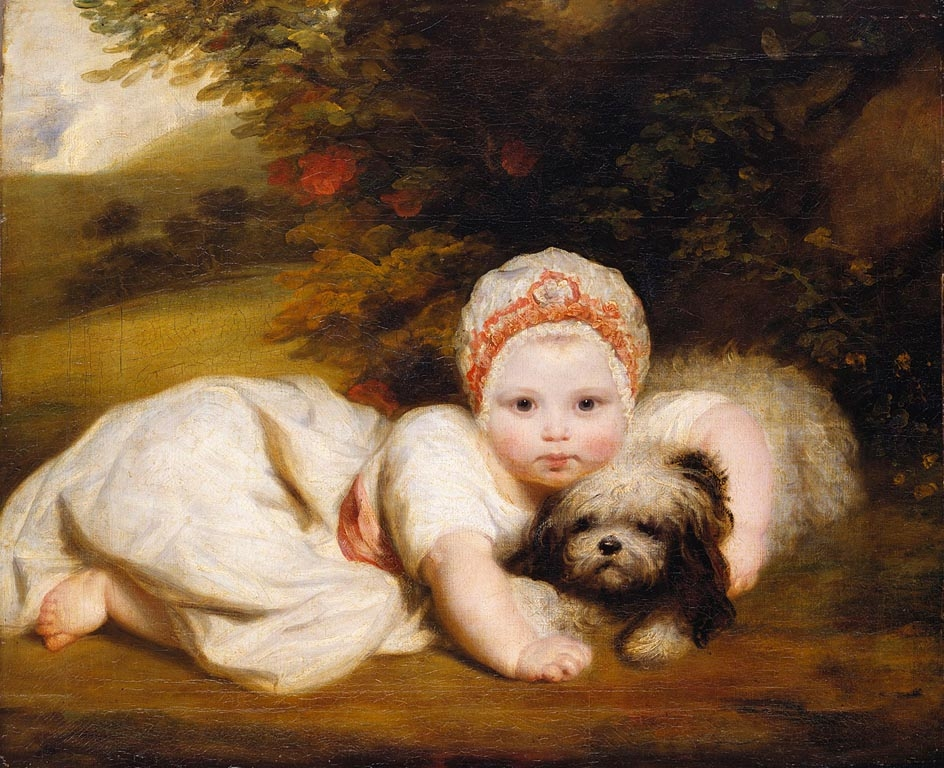
Princess Sophia as a young child.

Princess Sophia was born in Grosvenor Street, Mayfair. Her father was Prince William Henry, Duke of Gloucester and Edinburgh, the third son of The Prince Frederick, Prince of Wales. Her mother, the Duchess of Gloucester and Edinburgh, born Maria Walpole, was the illegitimate daughter of Sir Edward Walpole.

She was privately baptized in a drawing room at her parents' home in Mayfair, Gloucester House, on 26 June 1773, by Charles Moss, Bishop of St David's. She had three godparents: the Duke of Cumberland and Strathearn, her paternal uncle; the Duchess of Cumberland and Strathearn, her aunt by marriage; and the Queen of Denmark and Norway, her paternal aunt, who was represented by a proxy. George III had been asked to stand as godfather, but he declined, upset by his brother's marriage to Maria Walpole, a commoner.

Sophia was considered as a potential bride for her first cousin Prince William, Duke of Clarence and St Andrews (who later ruled as King William IV), but she expressed no enthusiasm for the match.

She lived at Gloucester Lodge on the Gloucester Road from about 1805 and remained there after her mother's death in 1807, but by 1809 she had sold the villa to George Canning. She also lived at New Lodge in Winkfield, near Windsor in Berkshire.

In 1811, Sophia visited the Royal Yacht Squadron, at Northwood on the Isle of Wight with her brother the Duke of Gloucester: the Gloucester Hotel, by the Parade, was named in their honour.

From 1816, Sophia held the office of Ranger of Greenwich Park and had a home at the Ranger's House, Blackheath.

Sophia was an early patron of the new seaside town of St Leonard's on Sea, where she stayed at Gloucester Lodge on Quarry Hill in 1831. The building was formerly named the Castellated Villa, but was renamed in her honour.

Sophia died at the Ranger's House, Blackheath, on 29 November 1844, unmarried. She was buried in St George's Chapel, Windsor.

== Ancestry ==
Ancestors of Princess Sophia of Gloucester

8. George II of Great Britain
4. Frederick, Prince of Wales
9. Princess Caroline of Brandenburg-Ansbach
2. Prince William Henry, Duke of Gloucester and Edinburgh
10. Frederick II, Duke of Saxe-Gotha-Altenburg
5. Princess Augusta of Saxe-Gotha
11. Princess Magdalena Augusta of Anhalt-Zerbst
1. Princess Sophia of Gloucester
12. Robert Walpole, 1st Earl of Orford
6. Sir Edward Walpole
13. Catherine Shorter
3. Maria Walpole
14. Hammond Clement
7. Dorothy Clement
15. Priscilla Clement

== Titles and styles ==
- 29 May 1773 – 23 July 1816: Her Highness Princess Sophia of Gloucester
- 23 July 1816 – 29 November 1844: Her Royal Highness Princess Sophia of Gloucester
  - 16 December 1834 – 29 November 1844: Her Royal Highness Princess Sophia Matilda of Gloucester

As a great-granddaughter in the male-line of George II, Sophia had the style of Highness from birth. On 22 July 1816, Sophia's brother, Prince William Frederick, Duke of Gloucester, married their cousin Princess Mary, a daughter of George III. On their wedding day, the Prince Regent bestowed the style of Royal Highness on the Duke of Gloucester. The next day, Sophia was also bestowed with this style, giving her equal rank with her brother.

== See also ==
- List of British princesses
- British royal family
- House of Hanover
