= Princess Sophia =

Princess Sophia may refer to:

== People ==
=== Great Britain ===
- Princess Sophia of the United Kingdom, a daughter of George III of the United Kingdom
- Princess Sophia of Gloucester, a great-granddaughter of George II of Great Britain
- Sophia Dorothea of Hanover, a daughter of George I of Great Britain
- Sophia of Hanover, mother of George I of Great Britain, and Electress of Hanover
- Sophia Dorothea of Celle, wife of George I of Great Britain

=== Germany ===
- Sophia of Prussia, wife of Constantine I of Greece, Sister of Wilhelm II, Granddaughter of Queen Victoria

=== Russia ===
- Sophia Alekseyevna, regent of Russia during the early years of Peter the Great

=== Spain ===
- Queen Sofía of Spain, daughter of Paul I of Greece; wife of Juan Carlos I of Spain
- Infanta Sofia of Spain, daughter of the Prince and Princess of Asturias, granddaughter of King Juan Carlos I of Spain and his wife, Queen Sofia

=== Sweden ===
- Princess Sofia, Duchess of Värmland wife of Prince Carl Philip, Duke of Värmland

== Other ==
- SS Princess Sophia, a steamer which sank off the southwestern coast of Alaska, killing all on board

== See also ==
- Sofia the First, a Disney series about a princess named Sofia
