= Supposititious child =

Supposititious children are fraudulent offspring. These arose when an heir was required and so a suitable baby might be procured and passed off as genuine. This practice seemed to be a common occurrence in ancient Rome, being used to claim birthright status to a Roman father's wealth and prestige, and rules were instituted to ensure that the children claimed by the wife were the legitimate children of the husband, or ex-husband, in some cases.

This was a common concern in the classical period as there were dealers in supposititious children who would provide them for a fee. Laws were passed to counter this and those found to be illegitimate might be sold into slavery.

== Roman inheritance laws ==
While Roman wives could own property of their own via the dowry system or inheritance, women had no legal standing to participate in public or political life. The upper class of Roman citizen was the patrician, and the right to participate in the Roman republic at the highest level was passed down from father to son, making paternity in the upper classes a state matter. Because of this, wealthy Roman families often employed a number of midwives to ensure that no sleight-of-hand occurred during the birthing period, and for a set period immediately after the woman gave birth. Because a Roman woman could file for a divorce after the edict of Julian and a man could do so much earlier, a divorced woman or a widow had to announce her pregnancy and allow observers if she was to claim the child as an heir of her previous husband.

== In western society ==
Supposititious children were a concern in Western society for thousands of years and were different from illegitimate children, who were designated by their paternity. Supposititious children were not the offspring of the father. Most societies were patrilineal, and the blood link to the father had to be established for the child to lay claim to the inheritance or, at the very least, the paternity could not be in doubt. That fear is associated with the term cuckold, borrowing the name of a bird notorious for tricking other birds into raising its chicks as their own.

== In folklore ==
Supposititious children appear in myths and legends across many Western countries. In some medieval European countries, fairies were believed to sometimes swap out human children with fairy children so that the human parents unsuspectingly raise the changeling as their own. In these legends, there must be a legitimate child present for the fairies to work their tricks on the human parents. These legends played upon the fear medieval men had concerning raising offspring that may not be their own. This was an issue among the rich, as often richer, older men would marry much younger women.

== In popular culture ==
The fear of supposititious children also appears in media in the twentieth and twenty-first centuries. With the introduction of DNA tests, men can request a medical procedure to gain incontrovertible truth about a child’s paternity. Due to court-ordered child support payments being levied on biological fathers in the event of separation, the fear of supposititious children has been extended from merely raising the child into the fear of having to financially support a child that does not share a biological link. Some entertainers have capitalized on this phenomenon by televising the results of disputed paternity suits. Maury Povich made the phrase “You are not the father!” famous on the show which shares his name.
