= Dorothy Clement =

Partner of Edward Walpole (c. 1715 – c. 1739)

Dorothy Clement (c. 1715 – c. 1739) as daughter of a Darlington postmaster, she was the partner of Edward Walpole and mother of his four children, including Maria Walpole, who became Duchess of Gloucester and Edinburgh upon her marriage to Prince William Henry, Duke of Gloucester and Edinburgh.

== Early life ==
Dorothy Clement's parents, Hammond (b. 1692) and Priscilla Clement (b. 1684), were married in 1712. Hammond was christened in Durham Cathedral in 1692, and his father, John Clement (b. 1670), worked as a porter at Durham College. Priscilla Clement may be connected to the Mrs Clement or Clements who is believed to have invented English mustard in Durham in 1720. Dorothy's father served as Postmaster of Darlington. At the age of 15, Dorothy left Darlington to work in London, where she initially lodged in Drake Street, Red Lion Square.

== Relationship with Edward Walpole ==
The earliest references to Dorothy Clement's time in London describe her "in the humble position of sitting on a Dust Cart... in all her rags and Dirt", but all note her remarkable beauty. Around 1730, she gained employment with a Mrs Rennie, variously described as a maker of children's coats, proprietor of a second-hand clothes shop in Pall Mall, or a milliner in Covent Garden. Edward Walpole was the son of Robert Walpole, considered to be the first Prime Minister of the United Kingdom (1721–41), and came into contact with her at this time. Hester Thrale later claimed Clement was Walpole's mother’s maid. Walpole had entered Parliament as Member for Lostwithiel in that same year, and was unmarried. Their relationship progressed, and she moved into his house. Walpole never married her, probably due to her lower-class origins, but they had at least four children together. The Walpole family treated the illegitimate children "as if they were legitimate", and all bore the surname of Walpole.

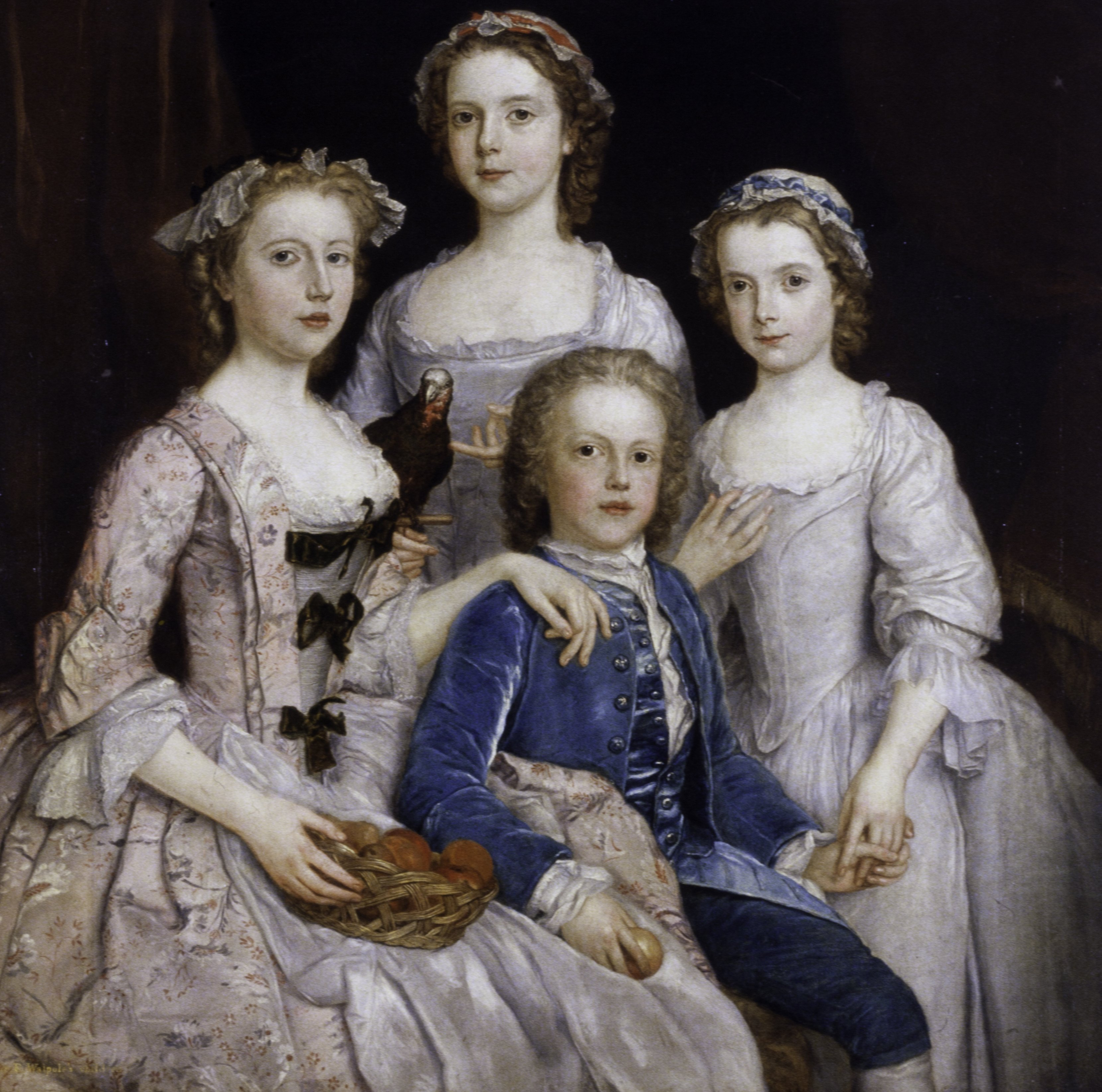
Children of Dorothy Clement and Sir Edward Walpole, by Stephen Slaughter: Laura; Maria; Edward and Charlotte

Dorothy Clement died around 1739. Her sister Mary was brought from Darlington to care for her children.

The children of Dorothy Clement and Hon. Sir Edward Walpole were:

- Laura, who married 13 September 1758 the Hon. and Rev. Frederick Keppel (later Bishop of Exeter) and died 27 July 1813, leaving issue;
- Maria, who married firstly 15 May 1759, the Earl Waldegrave, and secondly 6 September 1766, the Duke of Gloucester and Edinburgh and died 22 August 1807, leaving issue by both marriages;
- Edward, born 22 August 1737, died 1771, without issue;
- Charlotte, born 9 December 1738, who married 2 October 1760 Lionel Tollemache, Lord Huntingtower (later Earl of Dysart) and died 5 September 1789, without issue.
