= Edward Walpole =

British politician (1706–1784)

The Right Honourable Sir Edward Walpole KB PC (Ire)
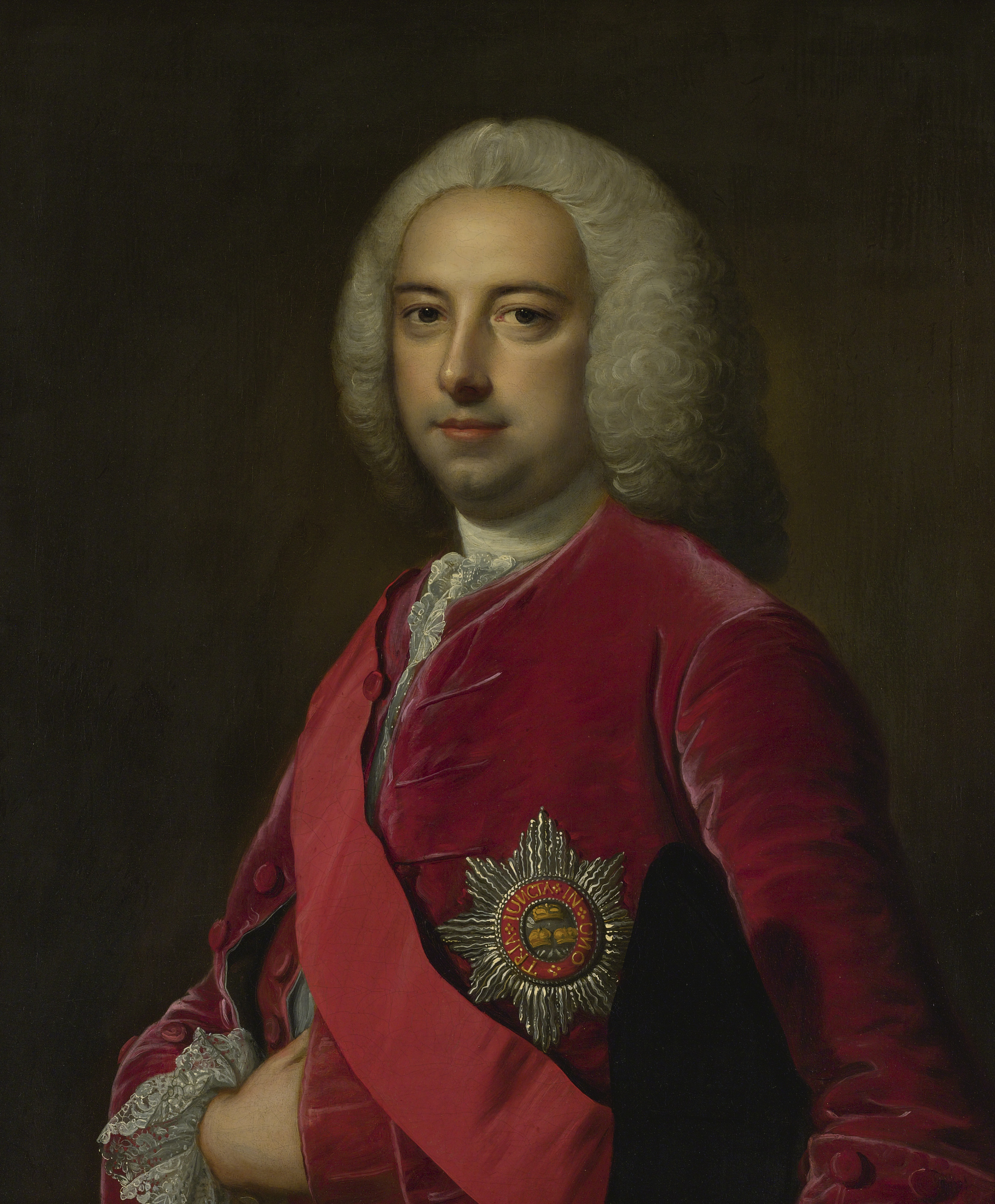
- Portrait by Thomas Hudson
- Born: 1706
- Died: 12 January 1784 (aged 77–78)
- Education: Eton College
- Alma mater: King's College, Cambridge; Lincoln's Inn
- Partner: Dorothy Clement
- Children: 4, including Maria, Duchess of Gloucester and Edinburgh
- Parents: Sir Robert Walpole (father); Catherine Shorter (mother)
- Relatives: Walpole family

Sir Edward Walpole KB PC (Ire) (1706 – 12 January 1784) was a British politician, and a younger son of Sir Robert Walpole, Prime Minister from 1721 to 1742.

== Early life ==
The second son of Sir Robert Walpole, he was educated at Eton (1718) and King's College, Cambridge (1725) and studied law at Lincoln's Inn (1723), where he was called to the bar in 1727. He undertook a Grand Tour in Italy in 1730.

== Political career ==
Walpole first entered Parliament as Member for Lostwithiel in a by-election on 29 April 1730, following the death of Sir Edward Knatchbull earlier that month. He was appointed junior Secretary to the Treasury the same year.

On 2 May 1734, in the next general election, he succeeded his uncle Horatio Walpole as Member of Parliament for Great Yarmouth in Norfolk, retaining the seat for nearly 34 years until the 1768 election, when his first cousin the Hon. Richard Walpole (son of Lord Walpole of Wolterton) replaced him.

On 7 September 1737 the Duke of Devonshire was named Lord Lieutenant of Ireland, and Walpole his Chief Secretary, though he also continued as Secretary to the Treasury. Walpole was sworn of the Privy Council of Ireland on 8 October that year and stood for Ballyshannon in the Irish House of Commons, a seat he held until 1760.

On 9 May 1739 Edward Walpole's elder brother Robert, Lord Walpole resigned his post of Clerk of the Pells in order to become an Auditor of the Exchequer, and Edward was appointed to succeed him, holding the office until his death. On 27 August 1753 Walpole was made a Knight Companion of the Order of the Bath, the order re-founded by his father in 1725.

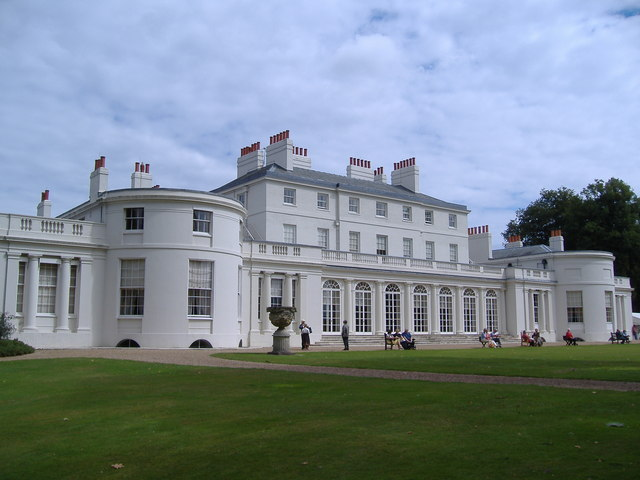
Frogmore House

== Family ==
Walpole lived for a time at Frogmore House in Windsor, Berkshire which he bought in 1748 and sold in 1766. He then bought a house in Windsor, which he gave to his daughter Laura Keppel in 1778, and spent his last years in Isleworth, where he died in 1784.

He had never married, but had a son (who predeceased him) and three daughters by his partner Dorothy Clement:

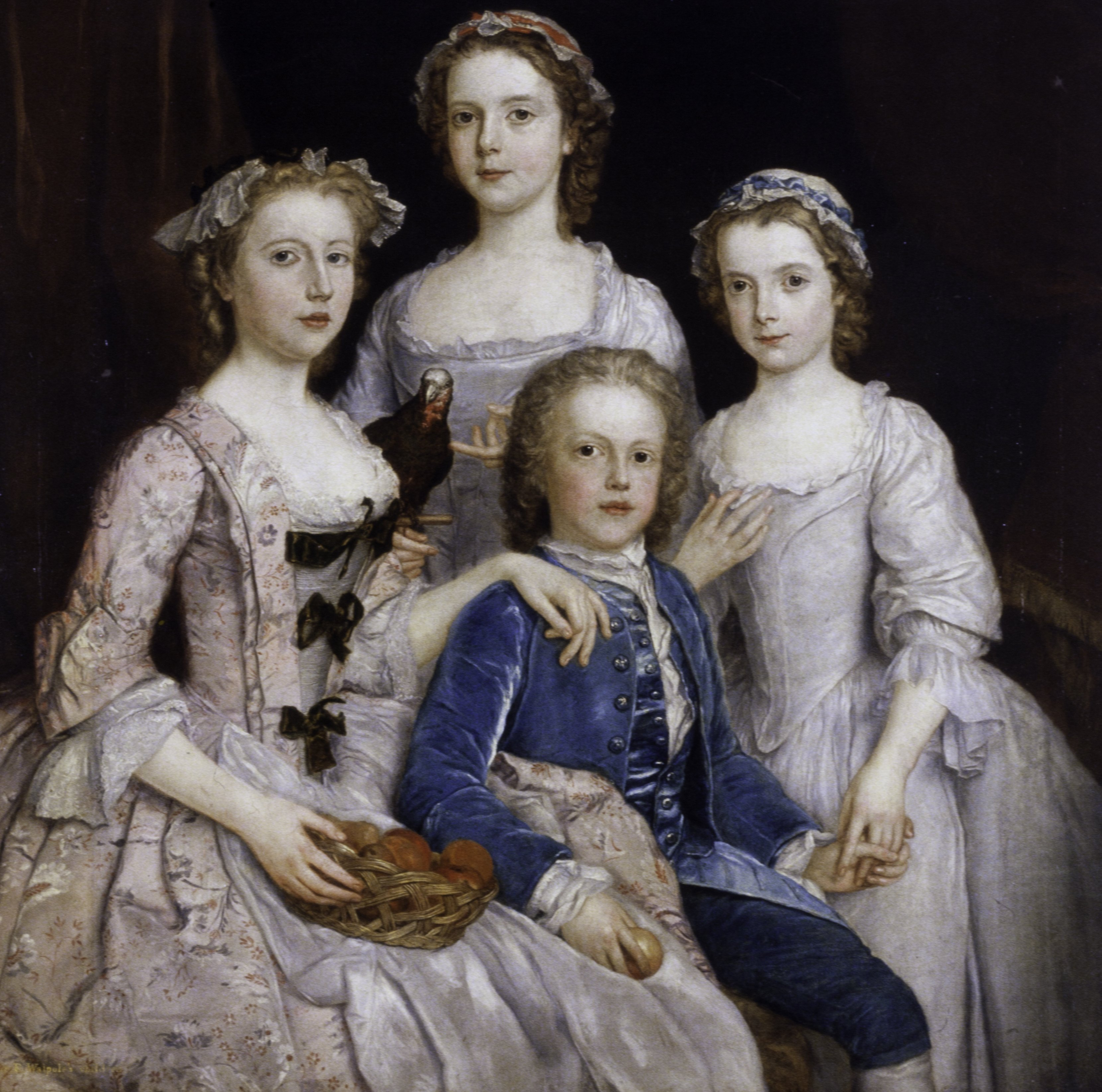
Laura, Maria, Charlotte and Edward

- Laura, who married 13 September 1758 the Hon. and Rev. Frederick Keppel (later Bishop of Exeter) and died 27 July 1813, leaving issue;
- Maria, who married firstly 15 May 1759, the Earl Waldegrave, and secondly 6 September 1766, the Duke of Gloucester and Edinburgh and died 22 August 1807, leaving issue by both marriages;
- Edward, born 22 August 1737 and died 1771, without issue;
- Charlotte, born 9 December 1738, married 2 October 1760 Lionel Tollemache, Lord Huntingtower (later Earl of Dysart) and died 5 September 1789, without issue.

== Sources ==
- John Burke, A general and heraldic dictionary of the peerages of England, Ireland and Scotland, extinct, dormant and in abeyance, Colburn and Bentley, 1831
- Joseph Haydn and Horace Ockerby (ed.), The Book of Dignities, 3rd edition, W.H. Allen and Co. Ltd, 1894, reprinted 1969
- thepeerage.com

Parliament of Great Britain
Preceded by Anthony Cracherode; Sir Edward Knatchbull	Member of Parliament for Lostwithiel; 1730–1734; With: Anthony Cracherode	Succeeded by Richard Edgcumbe; Philip Lloyd
Preceded by Horatio Walpole; William Townshend	Member of Parliament for Great Yarmouth; 1734–1768; With: William Townshend 1734–1738; Roger Townshend 1738–1747; Charles Townshend 1747–1756; Charles Townshend 1756–1768	Succeeded by Charles Townshend; Richard Walpole
Political offices
Preceded by Horatio Walpole	Junior Secretary to the Treasury; 1730–1739	Succeeded by Stephen Fox
Preceded by Walter Carey (also spelt 'Cary')	Chief Secretary for Ireland; 1737–1739	Succeeded by Thomas Townshend
Preceded by The Lord Walpole	Clerk of the Pells; 1739–1784	Succeeded by Isaac Barré
Parliament of Ireland
Preceded by William James Conolly; Thomas Pearson	Member of Parliament for Ballyshannon; 1737–1760; With: William James Conolly 1737–1754; Michael Clarke 1754–1761	Succeeded by Michael Clarke; Thomas Conolly
