= Maria Walpole =

Duchess of Gloucester and Edinburgh (1736–1807)

- Countess Waldegrave; Duchess of Gloucester and Edinburgh
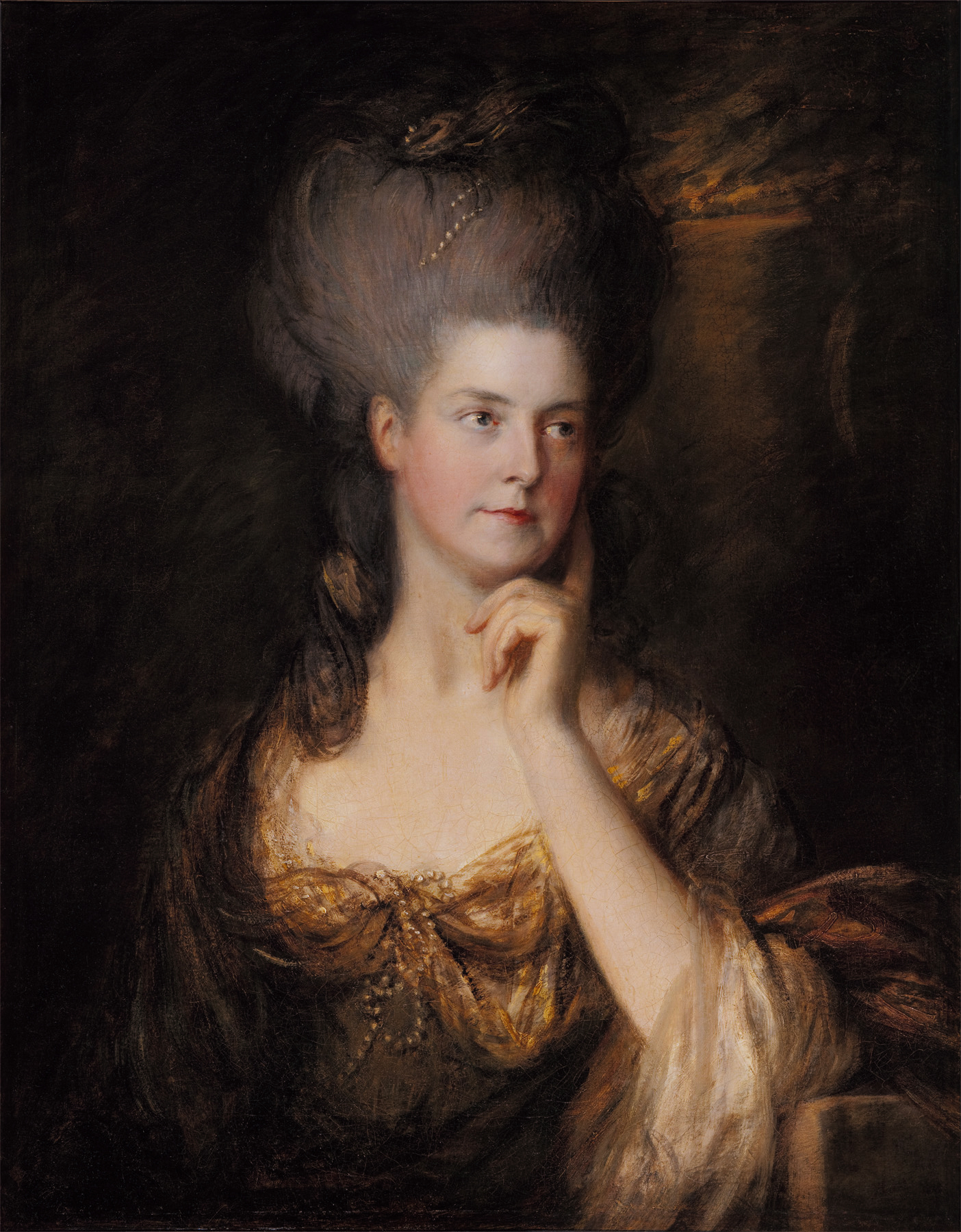
- Portrait by Thomas Gainsborough, c. 1779
- Born: 10 July 1736; St James's, Westminster, Middlesex (now London)
- Died: 22 August 1807 (aged 71); Oxford Lodge, Brompton, Middlesex (now London)
- Burial: 31 August 1807; St George's Chapel, Windsor Castle
- Spouse: James Waldegrave, 2nd Earl Waldegrave (m. 1759; died 1763) Prince William Henry, Duke of Gloucester and Edinburgh (m. 1766; died 1805)
- Issue: Elizabeth Waldegrave, Countess Waldegrave; Charlotte FitzRoy, Countess of Euston; Anne, Lady Hugh Seymour; Princess Sophia of Gloucester; Princess Caroline of Gloucester; Prince William Frederick, Duke of Gloucester and Edinburgh
- Father: Edward Walpole
- Mother: Dorothy Clement

Maria, Duchess of Gloucester and Edinburgh (née Walpole; 10 July 1736 – 22 August 1807) was a member of the British royal family. She was the Countess Waldegrave from 1759 to 1766, as a result of her first marriage to James Waldegrave, 2nd Earl Waldegrave. Her second husband was Prince William Henry, Duke of Gloucester and Edinburgh, whom she married in 1766.

== Early life ==
Maria Walpole was the illegitimate daughter of Sir Edward Walpole and Dorothy Clement. Her grandfather was Robert Walpole, Earl of Orford, considered to be the first Prime Minister of the United Kingdom (1721–41). She grew up at Frogmore House in Windsor, but her parents were not married, and her illegitimate status hindered her social standing despite her family connections.

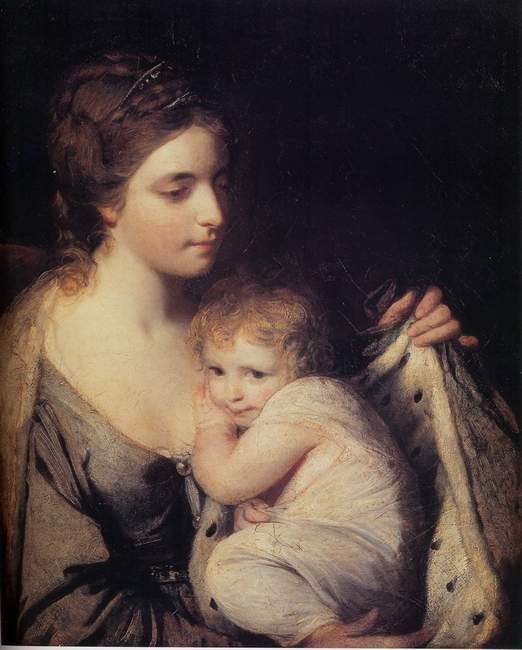
Maria and her daughter Elizabeth by Sir Joshua Reynolds, 1761.

== Countess Waldegrave ==
On 15 May 1759, she married James Waldegrave, 2nd Earl Waldegrave, at the house in Pall Mall of her father, Sir Edward Walpole. The ceremony was performed by her brother-in-law Frederick Keppel, the future Bishop of Exeter, and the official witnesses were Sir Edward and his brother, Horace Walpole. The Earl Waldegrave died on 28 April 1763. They had three children:

- Lady Elizabeth Waldegrave (1760–1816) who married her paternal first cousin the 4th Earl Waldegrave. Three sons became Earls Waldegrave and all succeeding earls are descended from this marriage.
- Lady Charlotte Waldegrave (1761–1808) who married the future 4th Duke of Grafton. All succeeding Dukes of Grafton are descended from this marriage.
- Lady Anne Horatia Waldegrave (1762–1801) who married Lord Hugh Seymour, son of the 1st Marquess of Hertford. Anna's and Hugh's descendants include Charles Spencer, 6th Earl Spencer; Diana, Princess of Wales; William, Prince of Wales and Prince Harry, Duke of Sussex. Prior to her marriage, she was perhaps secretly engaged to be married to Robert Bertie, 4th Duke of Ancaster (1756–1779), as she is said by her uncle Horace Walpole and others to have put on mourning for the dissolute young Duke.

There is a portrait of Maria in 1764–65, shortly after she was widowed, painted by Sir Joshua Reynolds, in the Dunedin Public Art Gallery. She also commissioned him in 1780 to paint The Ladies Waldegrave, a group portrait of her and Waldegrave's three daughters.

After her husband's death in 1763, she was then courted by William Cavendish-Bentinck, 3rd Duke of Portland. She scandalized society when she refused his hand.

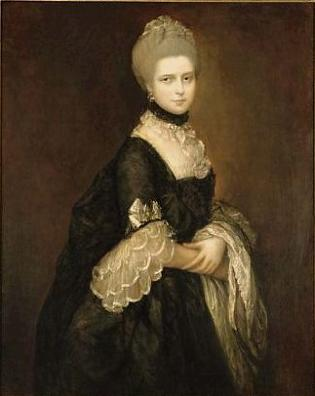
Maria (in mourning), by Gainsborough.

== Duchess of Gloucester and Edinburgh ==
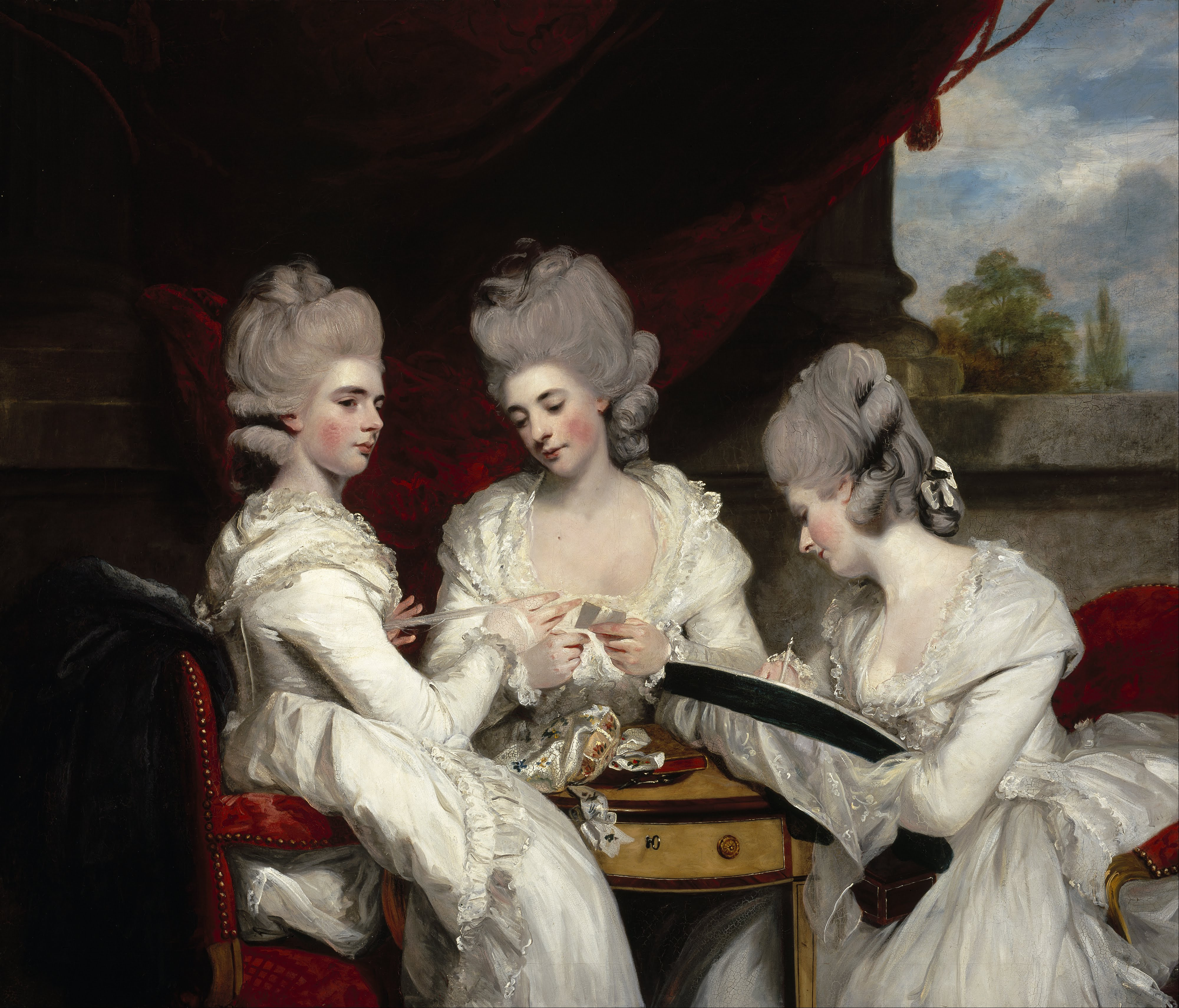
The Ladies Waldegrave by Sir Joshua Reynolds (L to R: Charlotte, Elizabeth and Anne)

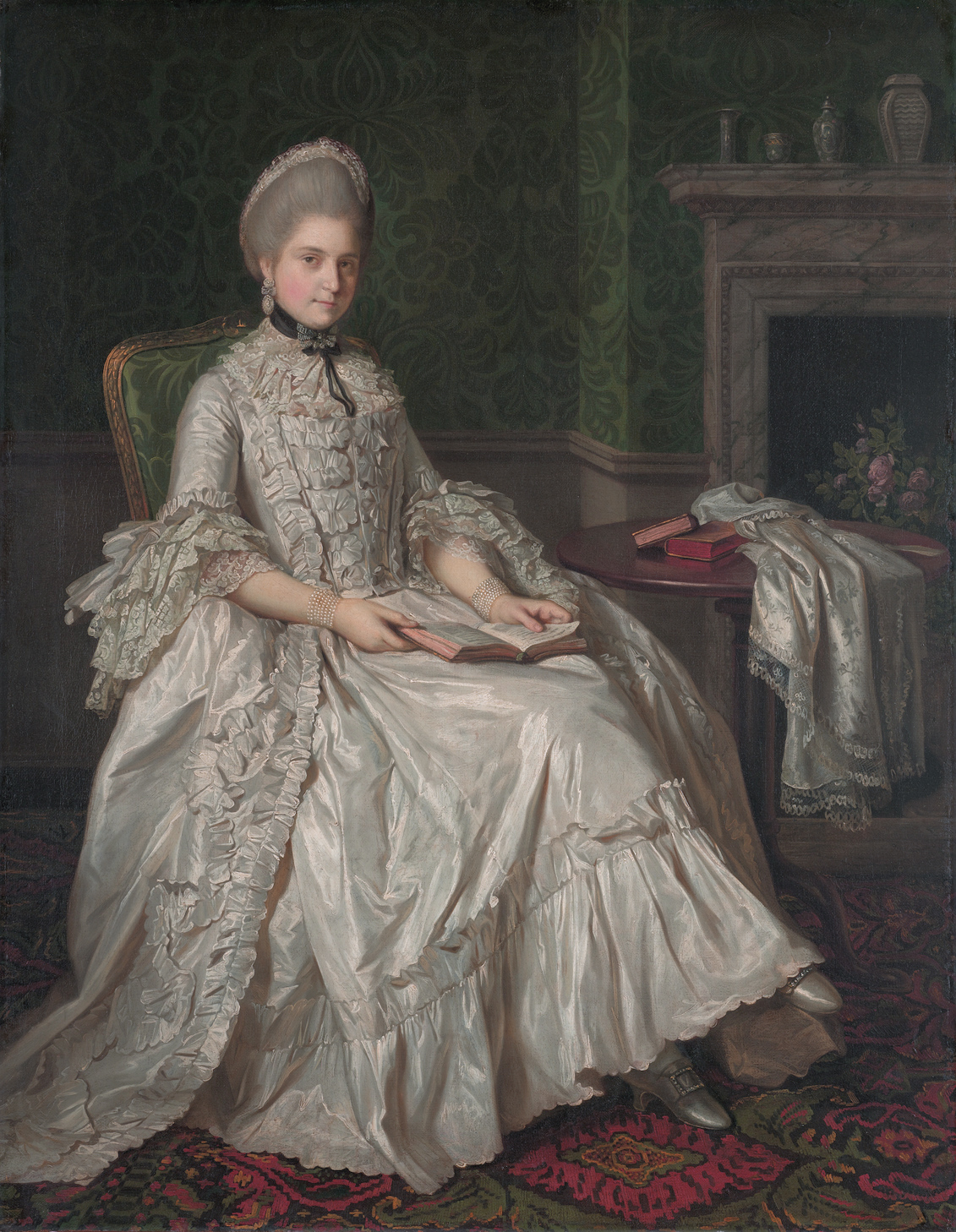
Maria Walpole, Duchess of Gloucester, by Nathaniel Dance Holland, c.1766-1769

On 6 September 1766, she married Prince William Henry, Duke of Gloucester and Edinburgh, at her home in Pall Mall, London. The Duke was a brother of King George III. The marriage was conducted in secret as the British royal family would not have approved of a marriage between a prince and a widow of non-royal rank and illegitimate birth. They lived at St Leonard's Hill in Clewer, near Windsor, and had three children.

- Princess Sophia of Gloucester (1773–1844)
- Princess Caroline of Gloucester (1774–1775). She died aged nine months following a smallpox inoculation, intended to protect her from the disease.
- Prince William Frederick, Duke of Gloucester and Edinburgh (1776–1834)

The marriage to a commoner of the Duke's other brother, the Duke of Cumberland, led to the passing of the Royal Marriages Act 1772, which required all the descendants of George II to seek the sovereign's approval before marriage. It was only in September 1772, five months after the passage of the Act, that the King became aware of Prince William's marriage to Maria. As the Act's provisions could not be applied retroactively, Maria and the Duke's marriage was considered valid. Due, however, to the anger of her brother-in-law at the marriage, she was never received at court.
