= Prince William Henry, Duke of Gloucester and Edinburgh =

British prince (1743–1805)

Prince William Henry
- Duke of Gloucester and Edinburgh
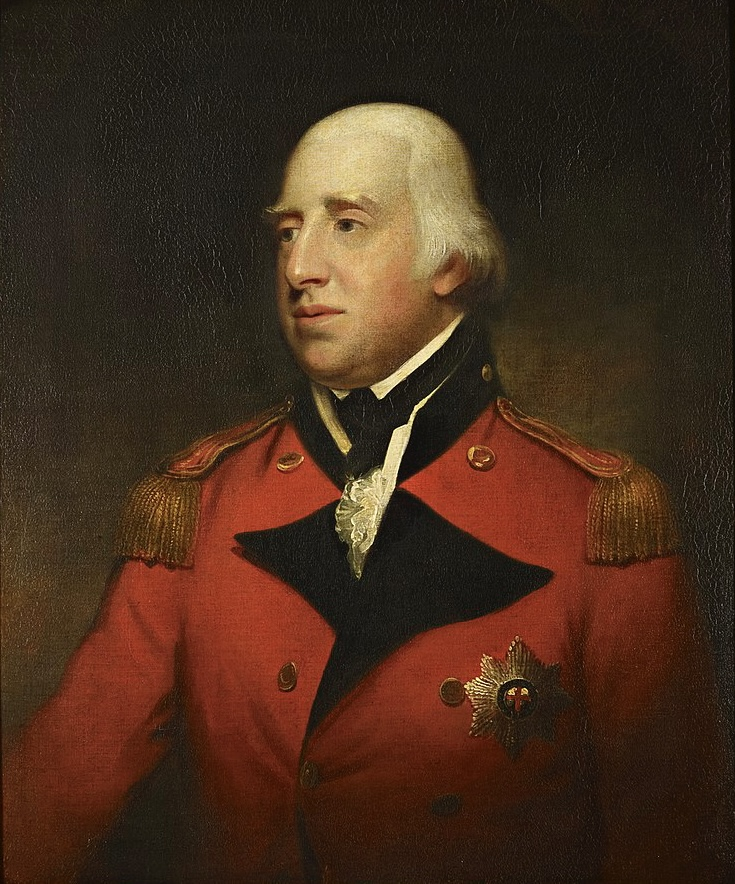
- Prince William Henry, c. 1800
- Born: 25 November 1743; Leicester House, Westminster
- Died: 25 August 1805 (aged 61); Gloucester House, Westminster
- Burial: 4 September 1805; St George's Chapel, Windsor Castle
- Spouse: Maria Walpole (m. 1766)
- Issue: Princess Sophia; Princess Caroline; Prince William Frederick, Duke of Gloucester and Edinburgh
- House: Hanover
- Father: Frederick, Prince of Wales
- Mother: Princess Augusta of Saxe-Gotha
- Military career
- Allegiance: Kingdom of Great Britain; United Kingdom
- Branch: British Army
- Service years: 1766–1805
- Rank: Field Marshal
- Commands: GOC Northern District

Prince William Henry, Duke of Gloucester and Edinburgh (25 November 1743 – 25 August 1805), was a grandson of George II and a younger brother of George III of the United Kingdom.

== Life ==
=== Youth ===
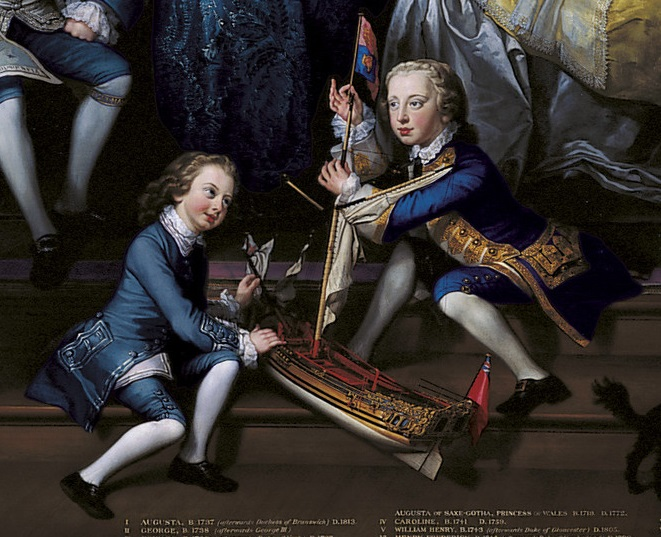
William Henry (left) with his brother Henry, from a family group portrait of 1751.

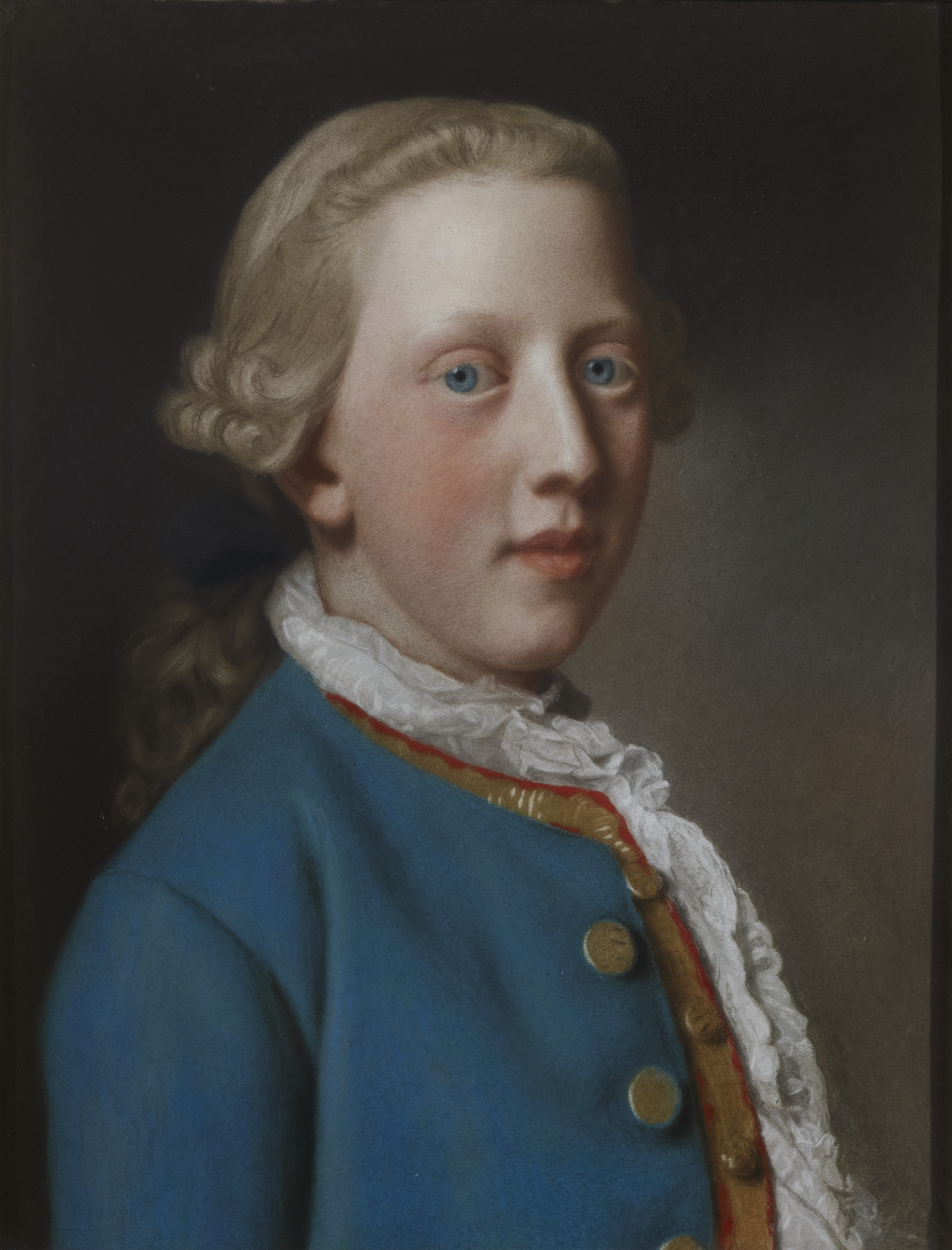
William Henry, aged 11, by Liotard

William Henry was born on 25 November 1743 at Leicester House, Westminster. His parents were Frederick, Prince of Wales, eldest son of George II and Caroline of Ansbach, and Princess Augusta of Saxe-Gotha, then Princess of Wales. He was baptised at Leicester House eleven days later. His godparents were his paternal uncle by marriage, the Prince of Orange; his paternal uncle, the Duke of Cumberland; and his paternal aunt, Princess Amelia. He was fourth in the line of succession at birth.

His father died in 1751, leaving William Henry's elder brother, Prince George, heir-apparent to the throne. He succeeded as George III on 25 October 1760, and created William Duke of Gloucester and Edinburgh and Earl of Connaught on 19 November 1764 and introduced to the House of Lords in January 1765.

He had been made a Knight of the Garter on 27 May 1762, and invested on 22 September of that year. In 1764, he began to court Maria Walpole, the Dowager Countess of Waldegrave, an illegitimate granddaughter of Sir Robert Walpole.

=== Career and marriage ===
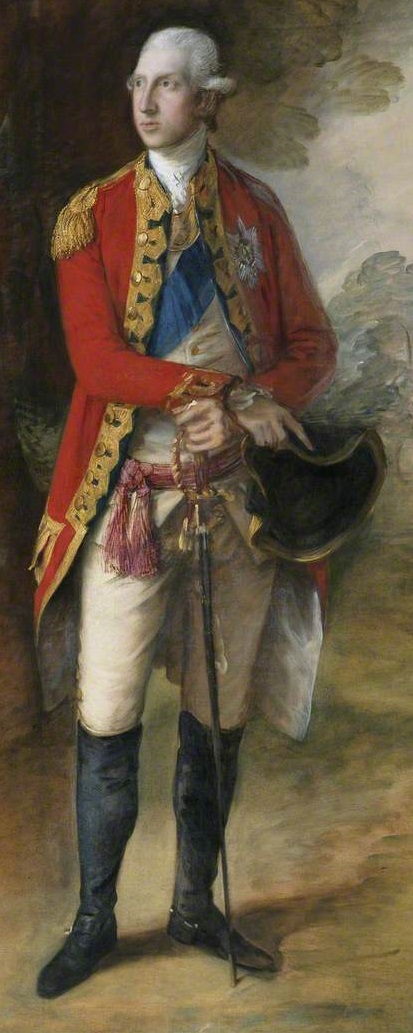
The Duke by Thomas Gainsborough, c. 1775

He initially wished for active service in the military, but his health and intelligence both proved insufficient. Instead he was appointed colonel of the 13th Regiment of Foot in 1766. That same year, he and Maria married in secret in his home on Pall Mall. This marriage only became known to the King after the passing of the Royal Marriages Act 1772. The Duke and Maria lived at St Leonard's Hill in Clewer, near Windsor and had three children, all of whom were styled Highness from birth and used the territorial designation of Gloucester in conjunction with their princely styles, as great-grandchildren in the male line of George II.

In 1767, he was promoted to major-general and made colonel of the 3rd Regiment of Foot Guards. The same year he was made Warden of Windsor Forest, gaining the post's official residence at Cranbourne Lodge. In 1768, he employed the renowned violin maker Richard Duke as his official instrument maker; giving him private lodgings in Old Gloucester Street and workshops in Gloucester Place. He was made the thirteenth Chancellor of the University of Dublin in 1771, holding the post until 1805.

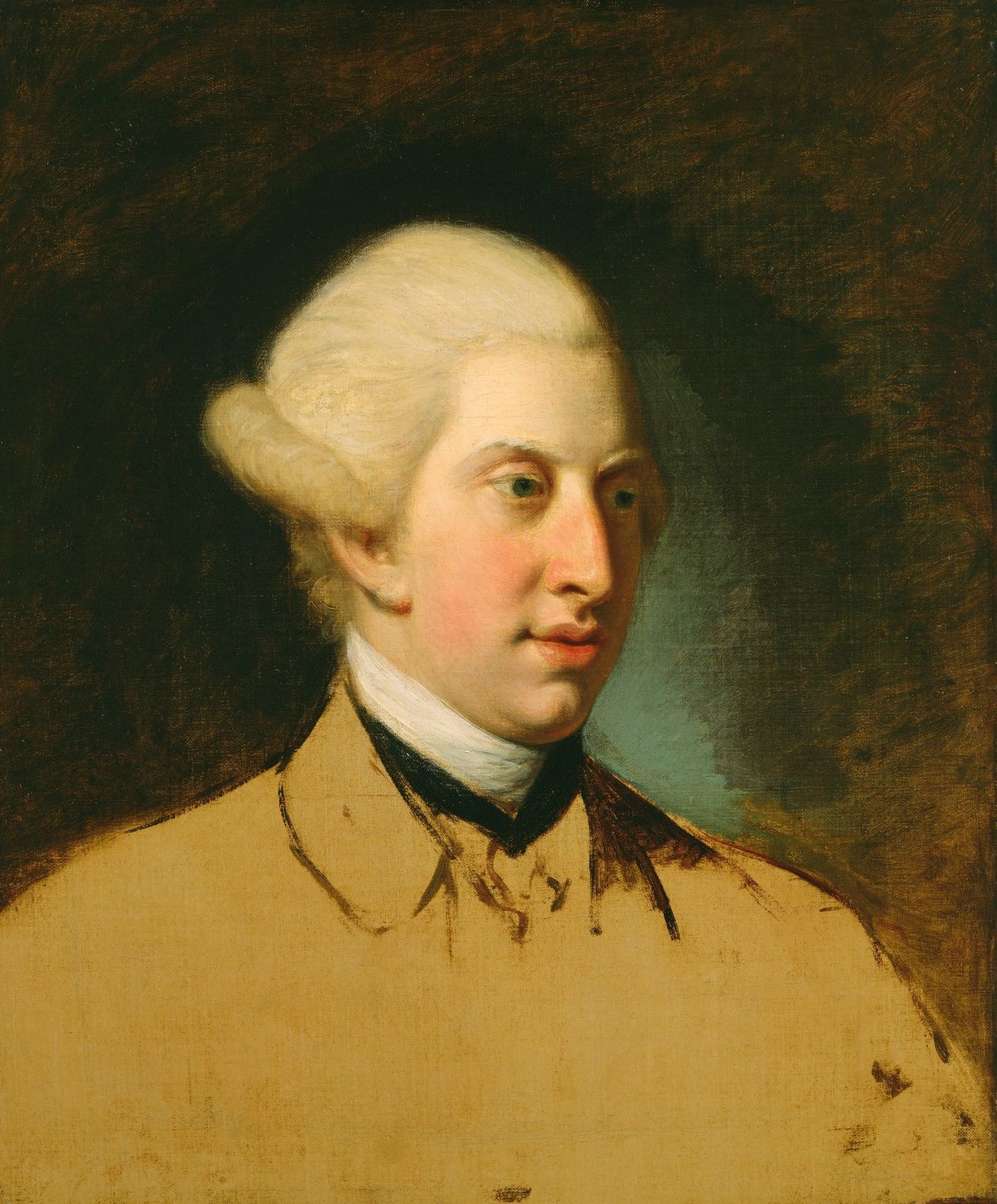
Prince William Henry, Duke of Gloucester and Edinburgh, by Johan Zoffany, c. 1780

The Duke and Maria had three children:

- Princess Sophia of Gloucester (Sophia Matilda; 29 May 1773 – 29 November 1844).
- Princess Caroline of Gloucester (Caroline Augusta Maria; 24 June 1774 – 14 March 1775) was christened privately on 22 July 1774; her godparents were the Duchess of Gloucester (her mother), the Hereditary Duchess of Brunswick-Lüneburg (her paternal aunt) and the Hereditary Duke of Brunswick-Lüneburg (her uncle by marriage). The princess died at just nine months old following a smallpox inoculation, intended to protect her from the disease.
- Prince William Frederick (15 January 1776 – 30 November 1834)

With the outbreak of the American War of Independence, the Duke hoped for a field command, but George refused. He made a request to serve in the forces of Frederick II of Prussia during the War of Bavarian Succession (1777–1779) – George consented but Frederick himself turned down the offer. He later transferred to the 1st Regiment of Foot Guards, and he became a field marshal on 18 October 1793. He went on to be General Officer Commanding Northern District in 1796, a command that he held until 1802.

=== Interests and family connections ===
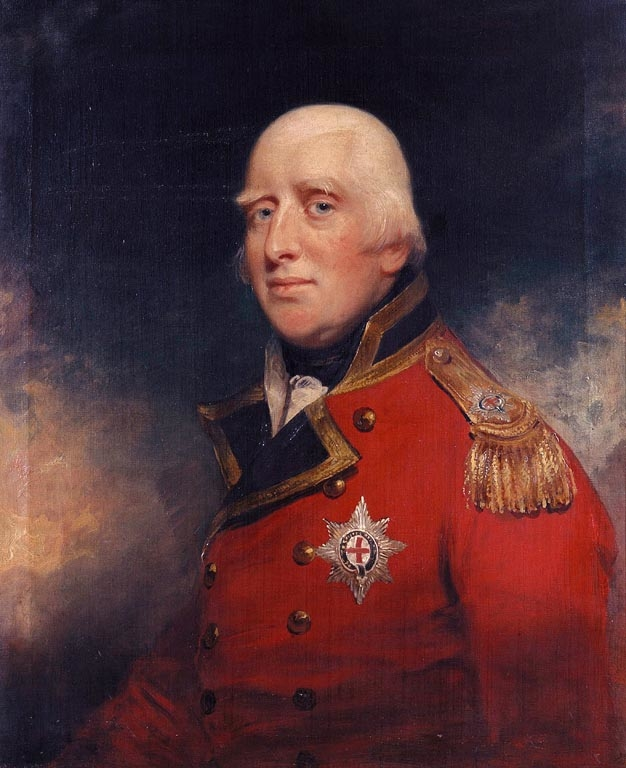
Portrait in 1804 by Sir William Beechey

In 1780, the Duke was made a Fellow of the Royal Society and remained interested in medical and scientific matters of the day. In 1797, he invited Norwich surgeon Philip Meadows Martineau to dine with him at Raynham Hall, the home of George Townshend, 1st Marquess Townshend whose first cousin was Thomas Townshend, 1st Viscount Sydney, after whom Sydney, Australia was named. The Marquess, like Martineau was a Whig and, at this time, Lord Lieutenant of Norfolk. In 1825, Sir William Beechey exhibited his portraits of both Martineau and the Duke at the Royal Academy.

Additionally, in 1782, an illegitimate daughter was born to the Duke,

- Louisa Maria La Coast (6 January 1782 – 10 February 1835), who later married Godfrey Macdonald, 3rd Baron Macdonald.

Her mother was the Duke's mistress Lady Almeria Carpenter, a daughter of the first Earl of Tyrconnell.

The Duke died at Gloucester House, London, on 25 August 1805, aged 61. He was succeeded as Duke of Gloucester and Edinburgh by his son, William Frederick, and was buried at St George's Chapel, Windsor Castle.

== Titles, styles, honours and arms ==
=== Titles and styles ===
- 25 November 1743 – 19 November 1764: His Royal Highness Prince William
- 19 November 1764 – 25 August 1805: His Royal Highness The Duke of Gloucester and Edinburgh

His peerages were gazetted on 17 November 1764.

=== Honours ===
- 27 May 1762: Royal Knight of the Garter (KG)
- Privy Counsellor (PC)
- Royal Fellow of the Royal Society (FRS)

=== Arms ===
The Duke's coat of arms

William was granted use of the arms of the kingdom, differenced by a label argent of five points, the centre bearing a fleur-de-lys azure, the other points each bearing a cross gules.

== Ancestors ==
Ancestors of Prince William Henry, Duke of Gloucester and Edinburgh

8. George I of Great Britain
4. George II of Great Britain
9. Duchess Sophia Dorothea of Brunswick-Celle
2. Frederick, Prince of Wales
10. John Frederick, Margrave of Brandenburg-Ansbach
5. Princess Caroline of Brandenburg-Ansbach
11. Princess Eleonore Erdmuthe of Saxe-Eisenach
1. Prince William, Duke of Gloucester and Edinburgh
12. Frederick I, Duke of Saxe-Gotha-Altenburg
6. Frederick II, Duke of Saxe-Gotha-Altenburg
13. Princess Magdalena Sibylle of Saxe-Weissenfels
3. Princess Augusta of Saxe-Gotha
14. Charles, Prince of Anhalt-Zerbst
7. Princess Magdalena Augusta of Anhalt-Zerbst
15. Princess Sophia of Saxe-Weissenfels

Prince William Henry, Duke of Gloucester and Edinburgh House of Hanover Cadet branch of the House of Welf Born: 14 November 1743 Died: 25 August 1805
Military offices
Preceded by Sir William Howe	GOC Northern District; 1796–1802	Succeeded by Sir Hew Dalrymple
Preceded by Harry Pulteney	Colonel of the 13th Regiment of Foot; 1766–1767	Succeeded by James Murray
Preceded by The Earl of Rothes	Colonel of the 3rd Regiment of Foot Guards; 1767–1770	Succeeded by The Earl of Loudoun
Preceded by The Earl Ligonier	Colonel of the 1st Regiment of Foot Guards; 1770–1805	Succeeded by The Duke of York and Albany
Academic offices
Preceded by The Duke of Bedford	Chancellor of the University of Dublin; 1771–1805	Succeeded by The Duke of Cumberland and Teviotdale
Peerage of Great Britain
New creation	Duke of Gloucester and Edinburgh; 1764–1805	Succeeded by Prince William Frederick
Peerage of Ireland
New creation	Earl of Connaught; 1764–1805	Succeeded by Prince William Frederick
