= Gleichen (disambiguation) =

Gleichen can refer to:

== Places ==
- Gleichen Castles in Germany
- Gleichen, Lower Saxony, a municipality in Lower Saxony, Germany
- Gleichen, Alberta, a town in southeast Alberta, Canada
- Gleichen (electoral district), a former provincial electoral district in southeast Alberta from 1905 to 1963.
- Drei Gleichen, a municipality in the district of Gotha, Germany
- Die Gleichen, a pair of hills in the district of Göttingen in South Lower Saxony in Germany

== People ==
- Lord Edward Gleichen (1863–1937), British courtier and soldier
- Lady Feodora Gleichen (1861–1922), British sculptor
- Lady Helena Gleichen (1873–1947), British painter
- Wilhelm Friedrich von Gleichen (1717–1783), German biologist
- Ludwig von Gleichen-Rußwurm (1836–1901), German impressionist painter
