= Diamond Jubilee of Queen Victoria =

60th anniversary of the monarch's accession

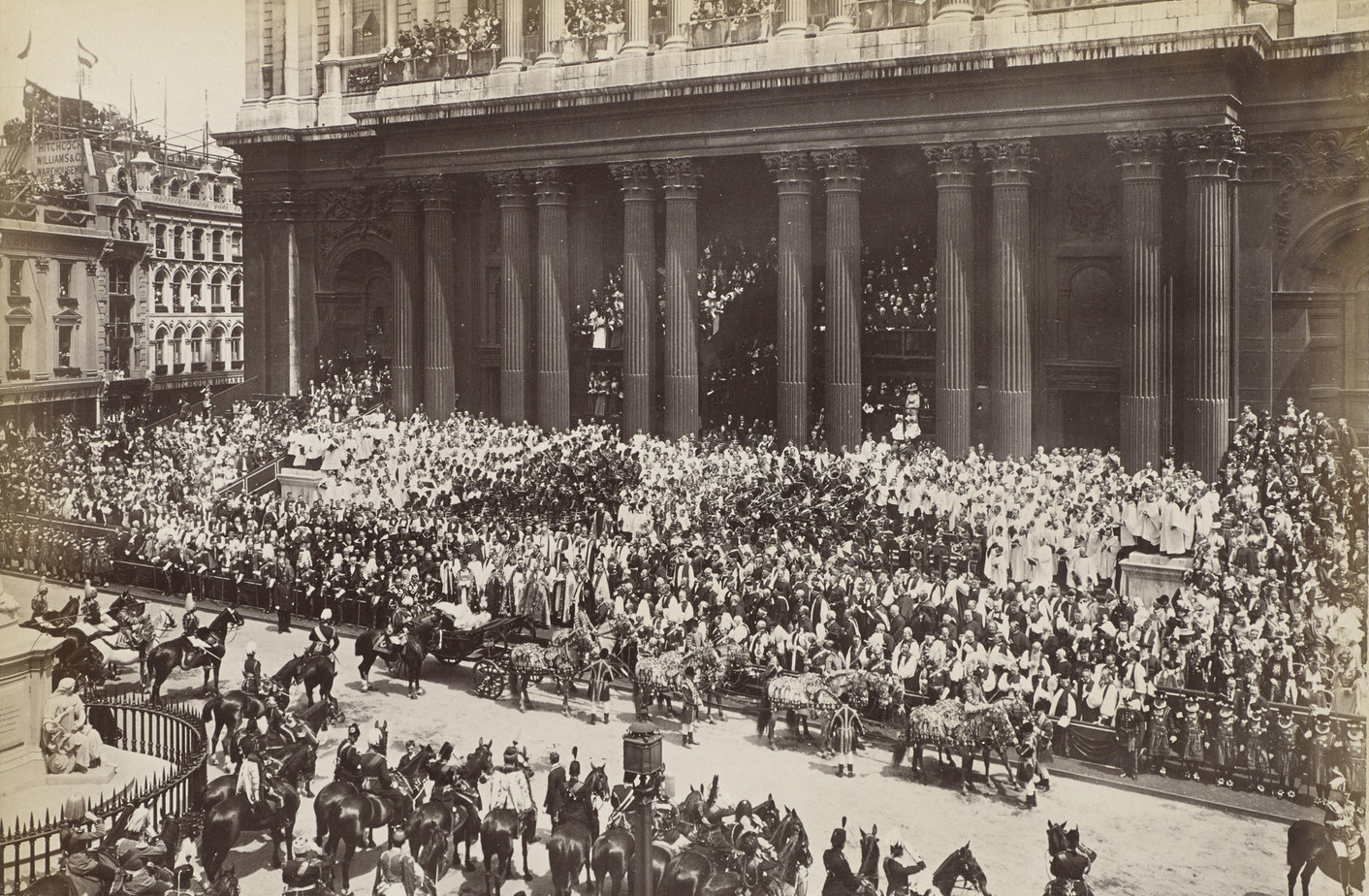
- Arrival of the Queen's carriage at St Paul's Cathedral to attend the Diamond Jubilee Service
- Genre: Jubilee of British monarch
- Date: 20 June 1897; 129 years ago
- Country: United Kingdom; British India; British Empire
- Previous event: Golden Jubilee of Queen Victoria
- Next event: Silver Jubilee of George V

The Diamond Jubilee of Queen Victoria was officially celebrated on 22 June 1897 to mark the occasion of the 60th anniversary of Queen Victoria's accession on 20 June 1837. Queen Victoria was the first British monarch ever to celebrate a Diamond Jubilee.

== Background ==
Queen Victoria surpassed her grandfather King George III as the longest-reigning British monarch on 23 September 1896, an event that she marked privately at Balmoral Castle. She wrote in her journal, "People wished to make all sorts of demonstrations, which I asked them not to do until I had completed the sixty years next June." The Diamond Jubilee was therefore an opportunity to celebrate Victoria's status as the longest-reigning monarch, in addition to marking 60 years on the throne. On 20 June 1897, the sixtieth anniversary of her accession, Victoria wrote in her journal:

This eventful day, 1897 has opened, and I pray God to help and protect me as He has hitherto done these sixty long eventful years! I feel sad at the new losses I have sustained, especially the last one of our beloved Liko! God will surely help me on! How well I remember this day sixty years ago when I was called from my bed by dear Mama to receive the news of my accession!

The sixtieth anniversary of her accession was celebrated on 20 June 1897 with a thanksgiving service at St George's Chapel, Windsor Castle.

== Events ==
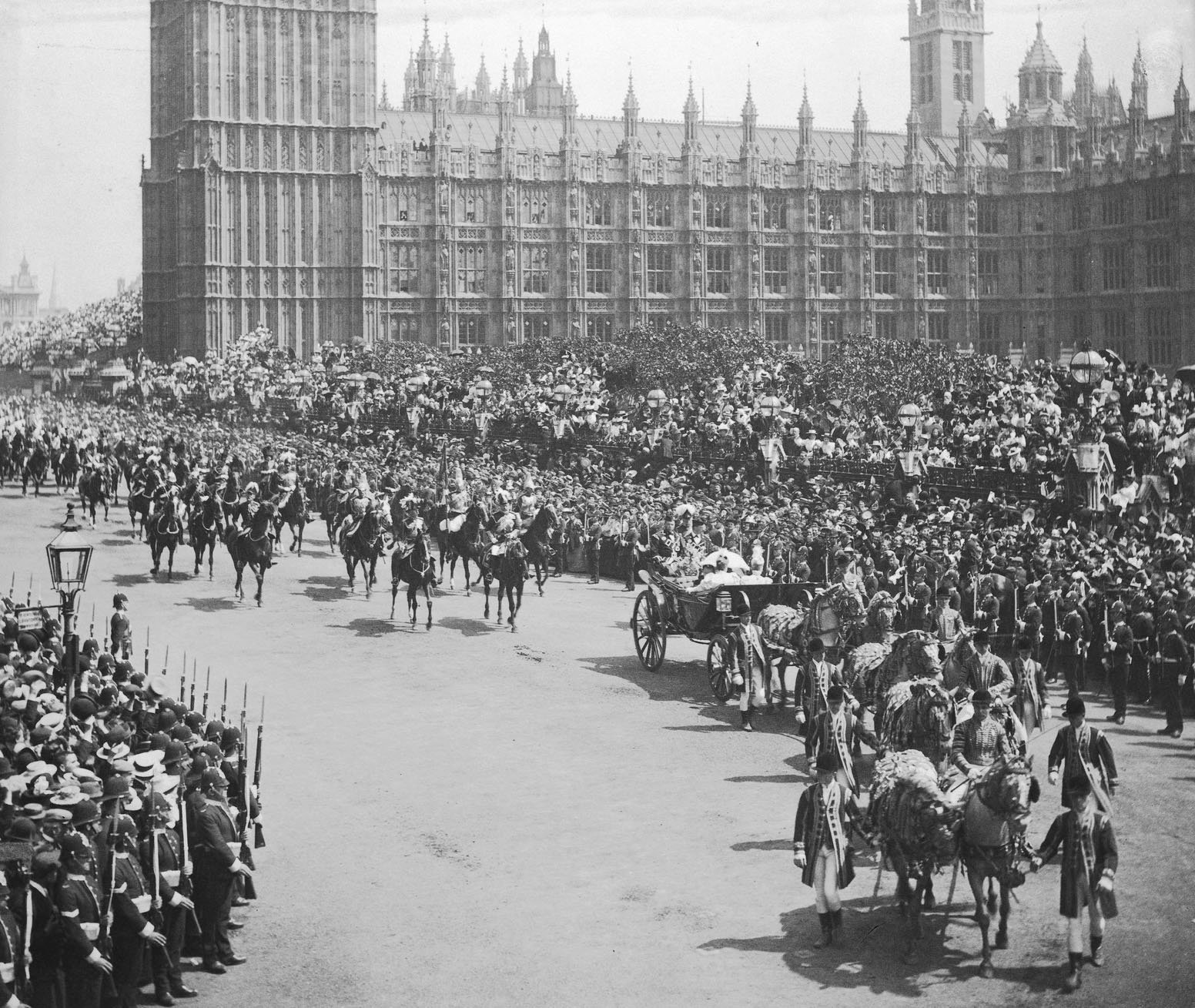
the Royal cortege passing the Houses of Parliament, 22 June 1897

The occasion was marked publicly two days later by the Festival of the British Empire proposed by Joseph Chamberlain, who promoted the idea of a global celebration fit for a monarch ruling over 450 million people. The day was declared a bank holiday in Britain, Ireland and India. The British Army and Royal Navy as well as troops from Canada, India, Africa and the South Pacific took part in the procession in London. The Queen telegraphed a message to all nations in the British Empire: "From my heart I thank my beloved people. May God bless them."

At 11:15 am, the Queen, along with Princess Helena and the Princess of Wales, took part in the parade in an open carriage from Buckingham Palace to St Paul's Cathedral, where thanksgiving service took place. Seventeen other carriages carrying members of the royal family followed her. Eleven colonial prime ministers were in attendance:

- Wilfrid Laurier, Prime Minister of Canada and Lady Laurier
- George Reid, Premier of New South Wales
- (Victoria (state)) George Turner, Premier of Victoria and Lady Turner
- Richard Seddon, Premier of New Zealand and Mrs Seddon
- Hugh Nelson, Premier of Queensland and Lady Nelson
- Charles Kingston, Premier of South Australia and Mrs Kingston
- Gordon Sprigg, Prime Minister of Cape Colony and Lady Sprigg
- Edward Braddon, Premier of Tasmania and Lady Braddon
- (Dominion of Newfoundland) William Whiteway, Premier of Newfoundland and Lady Whiteway
- John Forrest, Premier of Western Australia and Lady Forrest
- Harry Escombe, Prime Minister of Natal and Mrs Escombe

Suffering from severe arthritis and unable to climb the steps, the Queen remained in her coach, so the short service of thanksgiving was held outside the building. She was joined by the clergy and dignitaries. Victoria returned to Buckingham Palace after touring a large area of London. Later, when reflecting on the occasion Victoria said:

No-one ever, I believe, has met with such an ovation as was given to me, passing through those six miles of streets... The crowds were quite indescribable and their enthusiasm truly marvellous and deeply touching. The cheering was quite deafening and every face seemed to be filled with joy.

Thousands of residents in London and Manchester took part in street feasts, where Thomas Lipton distributed free ale and tobacco. A chain of beacons were lit across the United Kingdom and Nottingham, Bradford and Hull were granted their city charter as part of the celebrations. The following day the Queen visited Constitution Hill, London where 10,000 schoolchildren had gathered, and attended a reception in Slough.

The 1897 Epsom Derby was named the Jubilee Derby in honour of the Queen. The race was won easily by the Irish horse, Galtee More, who went on to win the Triple Crown of Thoroughbred Racing. Bonfires were lit in celebrations of Ireland's victory.

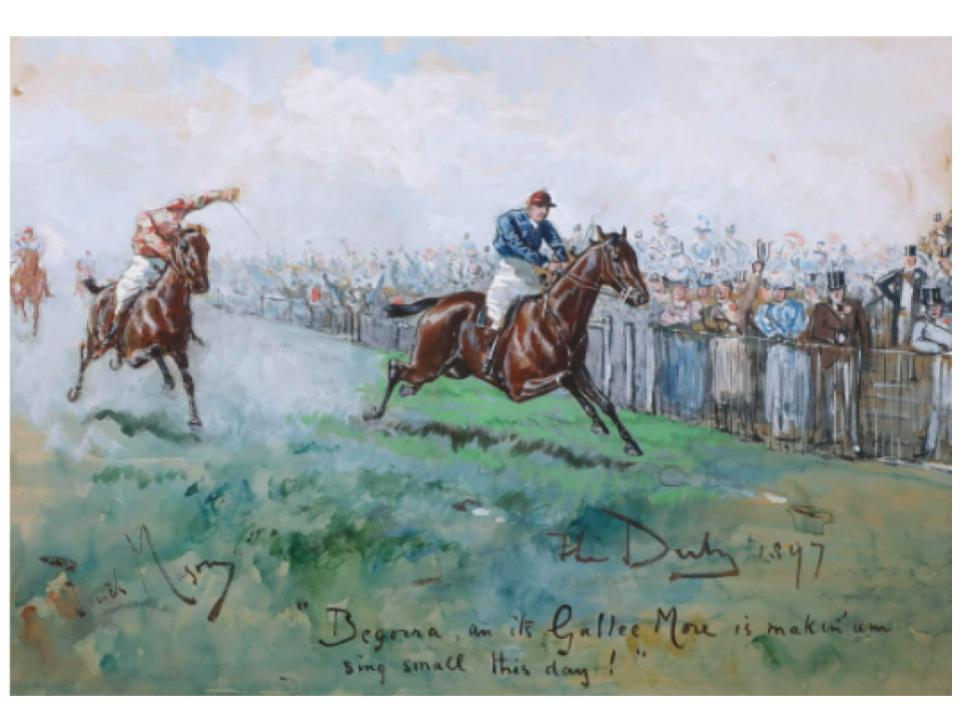
Galtee More easily wins the “Jubilee” Derby on 2nd of June 1897

The celebrations lasted a fortnight and a garden party at Buckingham Palace and a state banquet were held to mark the occasion. Memorial fountains and towers were erected to mark the occasion, including the Jubilee Tower on the moors above Darwen in Lancashire and the Cunningham Clock Tower in Peshawar on the North West Frontier of British India. Alfred Austin and Rudyard Kipling also wrote special poems in honour of the Queen.

=== Canada ===
People across Canada staged their own jubilee celebrations in honour of the Queen; Prime Minister Wilfrid Laurier led the Canadian delegation to the festivities in London. Laurier was knighted by the Queen in London on 21 June, and was made a Knight Grand Cross in the Most Distinguished Order of St Michael and St George. The Canadian cavalry led the colonial procession in the parade the following day as Laurier followed in a carriage. They rode five abreast. A group of the Toronto Grenadiers and Royal Canadian Highlanders followed the Prime Minister.

The Queen acknowledged the congratulations of Canadians with a message to Governor General Lord Aberdeen: "From my heart I thank my beloved people. May God bless them." Aberdeen responded, "On this, this memorable day, we offer the glad tribute of loyal devotion and affectionate homage. God save and bless the Queen." Canada's gift to Queen Victoria was the establishment of the Victorian Order of Nurses.

The Diamond Jubilee was celebrated in towns and communities all over Canada. On the festival of June 22, flags, buntings, and banners decorated the streets and covered buildings during the day. At night, electric lights, Chinese lanterns, fireworks, and massive bonfires lit up the sky. Jubilee processions took place in almost every populated centre. Newspapers remarked that the Jubilee, like the annual Victoria holiday, brought together Canadians from diverse backgrounds. A Winnipeg journalist wrote that the festivities "showed how patriotism can bind in joyous and fraternal bonds elements of every nation and creed".

In Victoria's honour, brand-new music was created, which endured for decades. Many of the patriotic vocal works of the Jubilee year combined expressions of Canadian loyalty with effusive panegyrics to Victoria. Roberta Geddes-Harvey, one of Canada's first female composers, composed words and music for Victoria the Rose of England (Canada's Greeting to the Queen on her Diamond Jubilee):

Oh Queen by Millions lov'd and feared!
O Empress thro' the world revered;
VICTORIA! the great, the good!
Thou crown of queenly womanhood!
Thy faithful subjects o'er the sea,
Greet thee with tender loyalty!

Another distinctive feature of Canadian festivities was their focus on children. There were frequently separate children's Jubilee parades from the "main" Jubilee processions. A "well-disciplined army" of 4,000 children from public schools and an additional 2,000 pupils from private Catholic schools marched in Winnipeg. This scene was repeated in cities across the country. One of the largest celebrations took place in Ottawa, where almost 10,000 school children marched to Parliament Hill, all carrying flags.

In some centres, the children's concerts were quite extravagant. The Band of the Royal Grenadiers provided musical support for the Festival Chorus of the Toronto School Children's performance at Exhibition Park in Toronto. It featured several well-known patriotic and traditional songs, as well as other pieces created especially for the occasion, in addition to renditions of God Save the Queen, The Maple Leaf Forever, and Rule, Britannia!.

=== Ireland ===
In Ireland the jubilee met with a mixed reception. Irish unionists unanimously celebrated the jubilee, while nationalists largely ignored it; there was a riot in Boyle, County Roscommon when a regiment stationed in the town celebrated the event. In Dublin James Connolly's "fringe" Irish Republican Socialist Party (IRSP) carried out the principal protest in Ireland against the jubilee; on the day of the event the IRSP led a crowd of several hundred through the streets of the city in a mock funeral procession carrying a coffin marked "British Empire" along with attendant slogans referencing Irish nationalist grievances with British rule. The procession, which was attended by Maud Gonne and W. B. Yeats, clashed with the Dublin Metropolitan Police (DMP) at College Green and ended with the coffin being thrown in the River Liffey; Connolly himself was arrested by the DMP.

== Guests at the Jubilee celebrations ==
=== British royal family ===
- The Queen
  - (German Empire) The Empress Frederick, the Queen's daughter
    - The Hereditary Princess of Saxe-Meiningen, the Queen's granddaughter (representing the Duke of Saxe-Meiningen)
      - Princess Feodora of Saxe-Meiningen, the Queen's great-granddaughter
    - (Kingdom of Prussia) Prince and Princess Henry of Prussia, the Queen's grandson and granddaughter (representing the German Emperor)
    - (Principality of Schaumburg-Lippe) Princess and Prince Adolf of Schaumburg-Lippe, the Queen's granddaughter and grandson-in law (representing the Prince of Schaumburg-Lippe)
    - (Grand Duchy of Hesse) Princess and Prince Frederick Charles of Hesse, the Queen's granddaughter and grandson-in-law
  - The Prince and Princess of Wales, the Queen's son and daughter-in-law
    - The Duke and Duchess of York, the Queen's grandson and granddaughter-in-law
      - Prince Edward of York, the Queen's great-grandson
      - Prince Albert of York, the Queen's great-grandson
      - Princess Mary of York, the Queen's great-granddaughter
    - Princess Louise, Duchess of Fife and the Duke of Fife, the Queen's granddaughter and grandson-in-law
    - Princess Victoria of Wales, the Queen's granddaughter
    - Princess and Prince Charles of Denmark, the Queen's granddaughter and grandson-in-law
  - Grand Duchess Alice of Hesse and by Rhine's family:
    - Princess and Prince Louis of Battenberg, the Queen's granddaughter and grandson-in-law
      - Princess Alice of Battenberg, the Queen's great-granddaughter
      - Princess Louise of Battenberg, the Queen's great-granddaughter
      - Prince George of Battenberg, the Queen's great-grandson
    - (Russian Empire) Grand Duchess Elizabeth Feodorovna and Grand Duke Sergei Alexandrovich of Russia, the Queen's granddaughter and grandson-in-law (representing the Emperor of Russia)
  - The Duke and Duchess of Edinburgh and Saxe-Coburg and Gotha, the Queen's son and daughter-in-law
    - The Hereditary Prince of Saxe-Coburg and Gotha, the Queen's grandson
    - (Grand Duchy of Hesse) The Grand Duchess and Grand Duke of Hesse and by Rhine, the Queen's granddaughter and grandson
    - The Hereditary Princess and Hereditary Prince of Hohenlohe-Langenburg, the Queen's granddaughter and grandson-in-law
    - Princess Beatrice of Edinburgh and Saxe-Coburg and Gotha, the Queen's granddaughter
  - Princess and Prince Christian of Schleswig-Holstein, the Queen's daughter and son-in-law
    - Prince Christian Victor of Schleswig-Holstein, the Queen's grandson
    - Prince Albert of Schleswig-Holstein, the Queen's grandson
    - Princess Helena Victoria of Schleswig-Holstein, the Queen's granddaughter
    - (Duchy of Anhalt) Princess and Prince Aribert of Anhalt, the Queen's granddaughter and grandson-in-law (representing the Duke of Anhalt)
  - The Princess Louise, Marchioness of Lorne and Marquess of Lorne, the Queen's daughter and son-in-law
  - The Duke and Duchess of Connaught and Strathearn, the Queen's son and daughter-in-law
    - Princess Margaret of Connaught, the Queen's granddaughter
    - Prince Arthur of Connaught, the Queen's grandson
    - Princess Patricia of Connaught, the Queen's granddaughter
  - The Duchess of Albany, the Queen's daughter-in-law
    - Princess Alice of Albany, the Queen's granddaughter
    - The Duke of Albany, the Queen's grandson
  - Princess Henry of Battenberg, the Queen's daughter
    - Prince Alexander of Battenberg, the Queen's grandson
    - Princess Victoria Eugenie of Battenberg, the Queen's granddaughter
    - Prince Leopold of Battenberg, the Queen's grandson
    - Prince Maurice of Battenberg, the Queen's grandson

Other descendants of the Queen's paternal grandfather, King George III and their families:

- The Duke of Cambridge, the Queen's first cousin
  - Augustus FitzGeorge, the Queen's first cousin once removed
- (Grand Duchy of Mecklenburg-Strelitz) The Grand Duchess and Grand Duke of Mecklenburg-Strelitz, the Queen's first cousin and her husband
- The Duchess and Duke of Teck, the Queen's first cousin and her husband
  - Prince and Princess Adolphus of Teck, the Queen's first cousin once removed and his wife
  - Prince Francis of Teck, the Queen's first cousin once removed
  - Prince Alexander of Teck, the Queen's first cousin once removed
- Princess Frederica of Hanover and Baron Alphons von Pawel-Rammingen, the Queen's first cousin once removed and her husband
- The Hon. Aubrey FitzClarence, the Queen's first cousin twice removed (and great-grandson of King William IV)

=== Foreign royals ===
- Ernst, Prince of Leiningen and Marie, Princess of Leiningen, the Queen's half-nephew and half-niece-in-law
- Princess Victor of Hohenlohe-Langenburg, the Queen's half-niece-in-law
  - Countess Feodora Gleichen, the Queen's half-great-niece
  - Count Edward Gleichen, the Queen's half-great-nephew
  - Countess Victoria Gleichen, the Queen's half-great-niece
  - Countess Helena Gleichen, the Queen's half-great-niece
- Count Albert von Mensdorff-Pouilly-Dietrichstein, the Queen's first cousin once removed
- Prince Philipp of Saxe-Coburg and Gotha, the Queen's first cousin once removed
- Prince August Leopold of Saxe-Coburg and Gotha, the Queen's first cousin twice removed
- (Kingdom of Württemberg) Albrecht, Duke of Württemberg, the Queen's first cousin twice removed (representing the King of Württemberg)
- (Kingdom of Italy) Prince Victor Emmanuel and Princess Elena of Naples (representing the King of Italy)
- (Austria-Hungary) Archduke Franz Ferdinand of Austria (representing the Emperor of Austria)
- (Thailand) Crown Prince Vajiravudh of Siam (representing the King of Siam)
- (Thailand) Prince Mahisara Rajaharudaya of Siam
- (Kingdom of Prussia) Prince Albert of Prussia, regent of the Duchy of Brunswick
- Prince Valdemar of Denmark (representing the King of Denmark)
- (Empire of Japan) Prince Arisugawa Takehito (representing the Emperor of Japan)
- Prince Eugen, Duke of Närke (representing the King of Sweden and Norway)
- (Russian Empire) Grand Duke Kirill Vladimirovich of Russia
- Prince Rupprecht of Bavaria (representing the Prince Regent of Bavaria)
- (Kingdom of Saxony) Prince Frederick, Duke of Saxony (representing the King of Saxony)
- (Kingdom of Portugal) Afonso, Duke of Porto (representing the King of Portugal)
- William, Hereditary Grand Duke of Luxembourg (representing the Grand Duke of Luxembourg)
- (Qajar Iran) Prince Vajihollah Mirza Seif-al Molk a.k.a. Amir Khan Sardar (representing the Shah of Persia)
- (Principality of Montenegro) Danilo, Hereditary Prince of Montenegro (representing the Prince of Montenegro)
- (Saxe-Weimar-Eisenach) Prince and Princess Edward of Saxe-Weimar
- Prince Hermann of Saxe-Weimar-Eisenach (representing the Grand Duke of Saxe-Weimar-Eisenach)
- (Khedivate of Egypt) Prince Mohammed Ali Tewfik (representing the Khedive of Egypt and Sudan)
- Prince Charles de Ligne (representing the King of Belgium)

=== Ambassadors ===
- (French Third Republic) General Léopold Davout d'Auerstaedt
- (Spain) Duke of Sotomayor
- (Ottoman Empire) Munir Pasha
- (United States) Whitelaw Reid
- (Vatican City) Monsignor Sambucetti
- (Netherlands) Count van Lynden
- (Qing dynasty) Chang Yen Hoon
- (Korean Empire) Min Young-hwan
- (Grand Duchy of Baden) Herr von Brauer

== Gallery ==
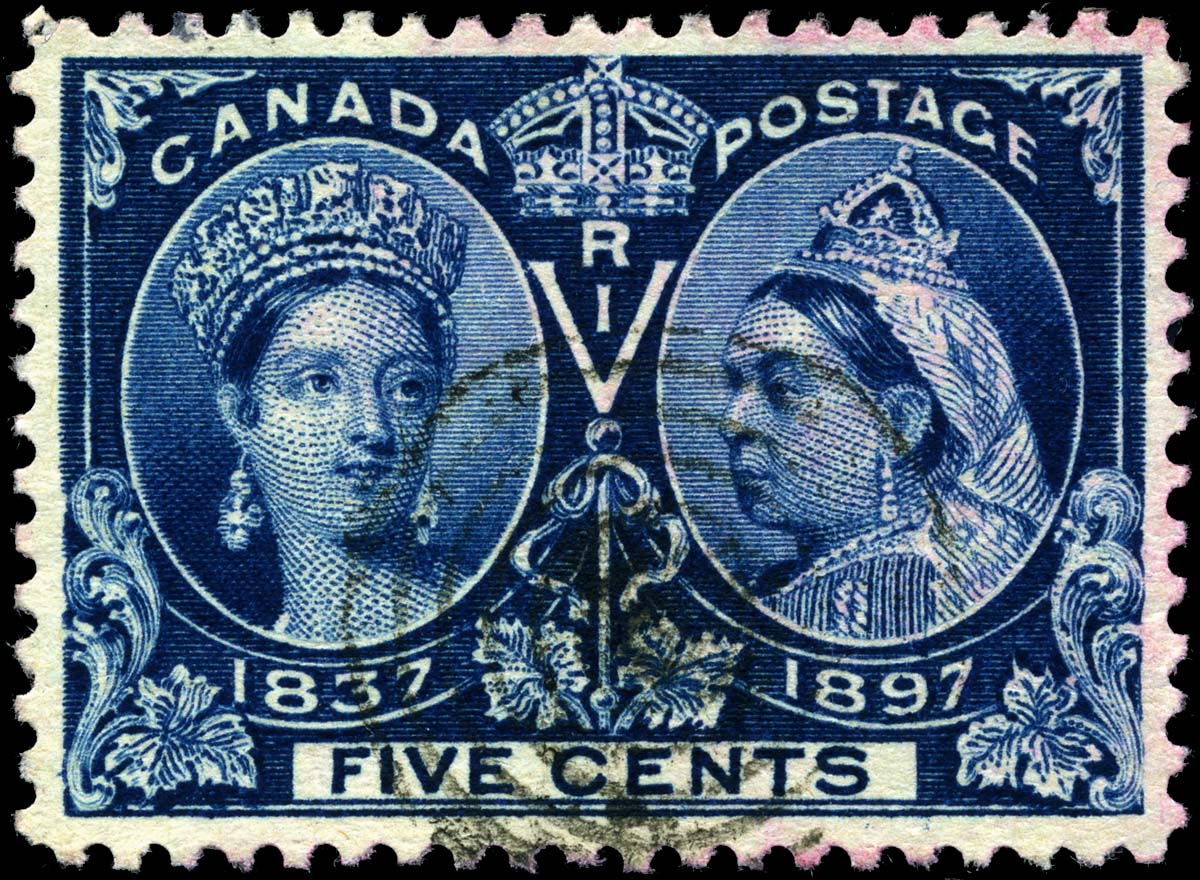
Canada 5-cent Diamond Jubilee stamp, 1897

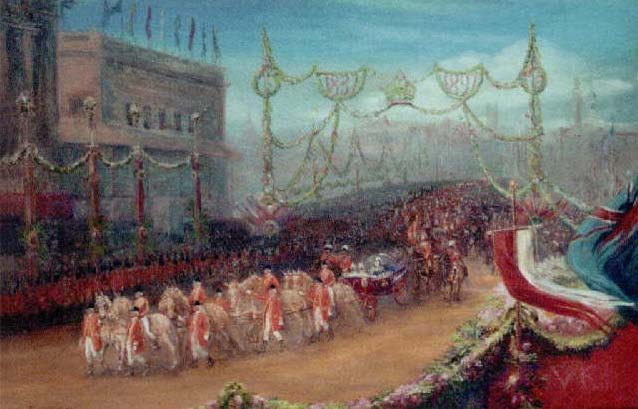
Queen Victoria's Diamond Jubilee procession passing over London Bridge, 1897 by Helen Thornycroft

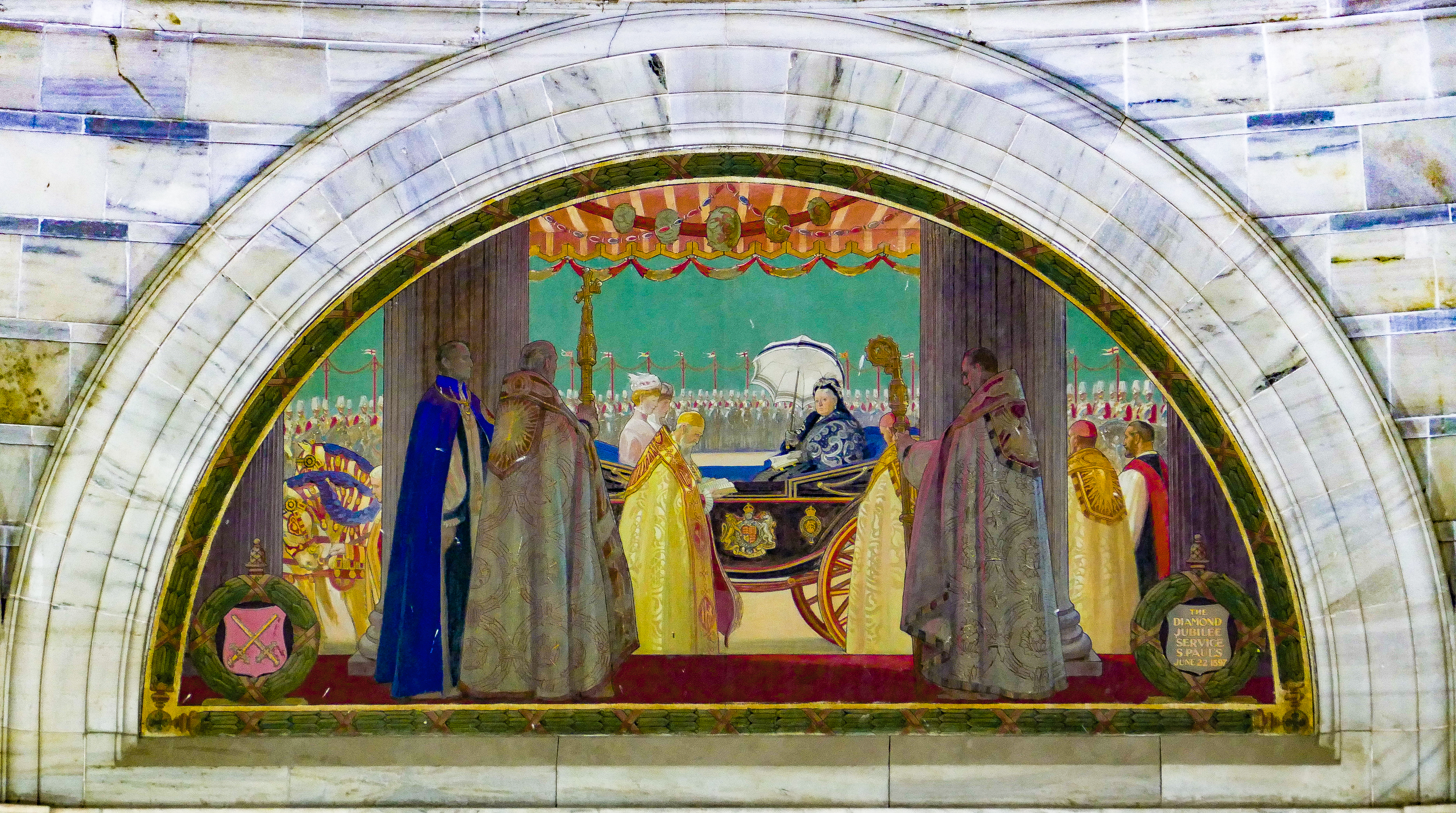
The Diamond Jubilee Service at St Paul's, panel at Victoria Memorial, Kolkata

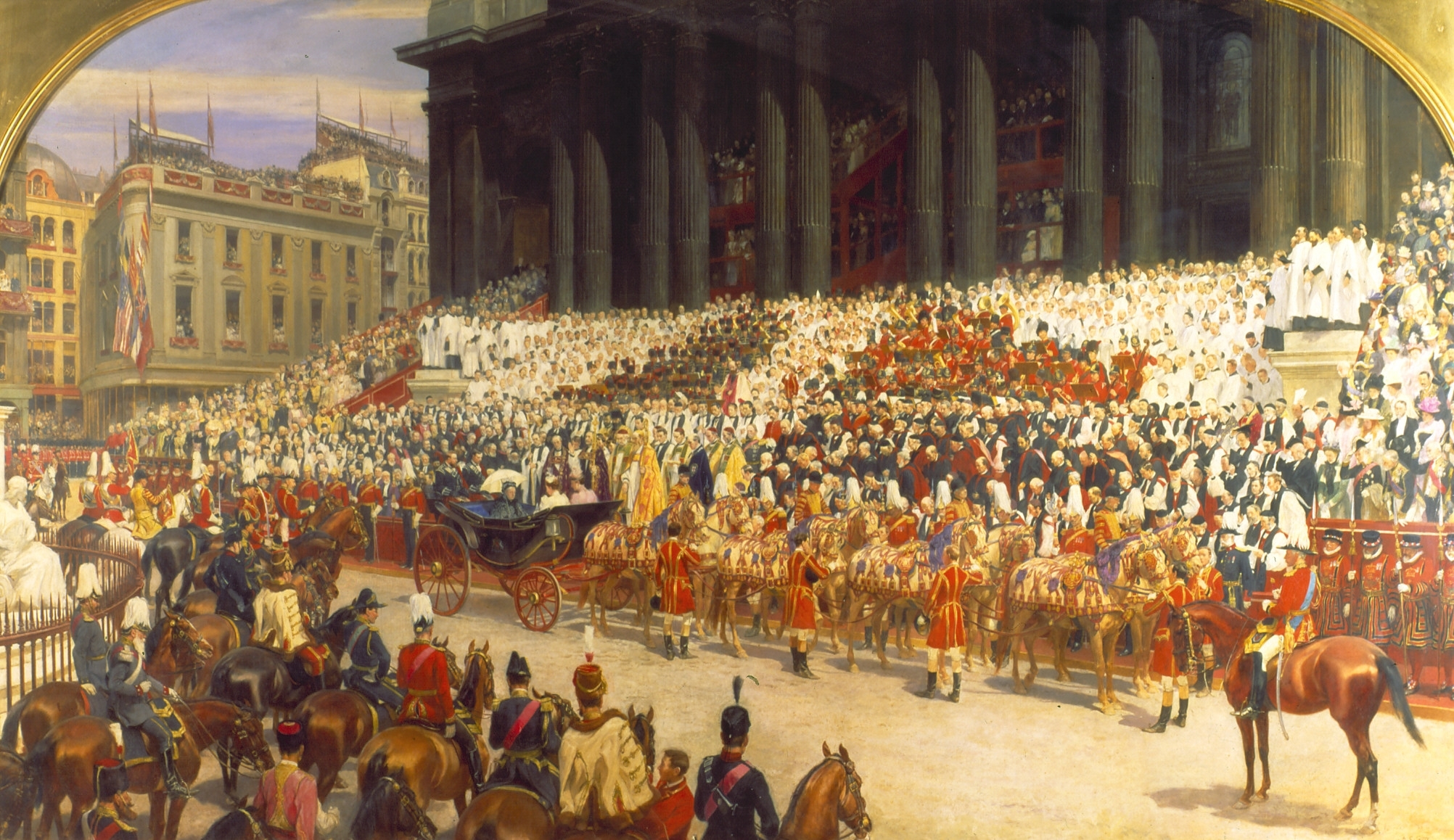
Queen Victoria's Diamond Jubilee Service, 22 June 1897 by Andrew Carrick Gow

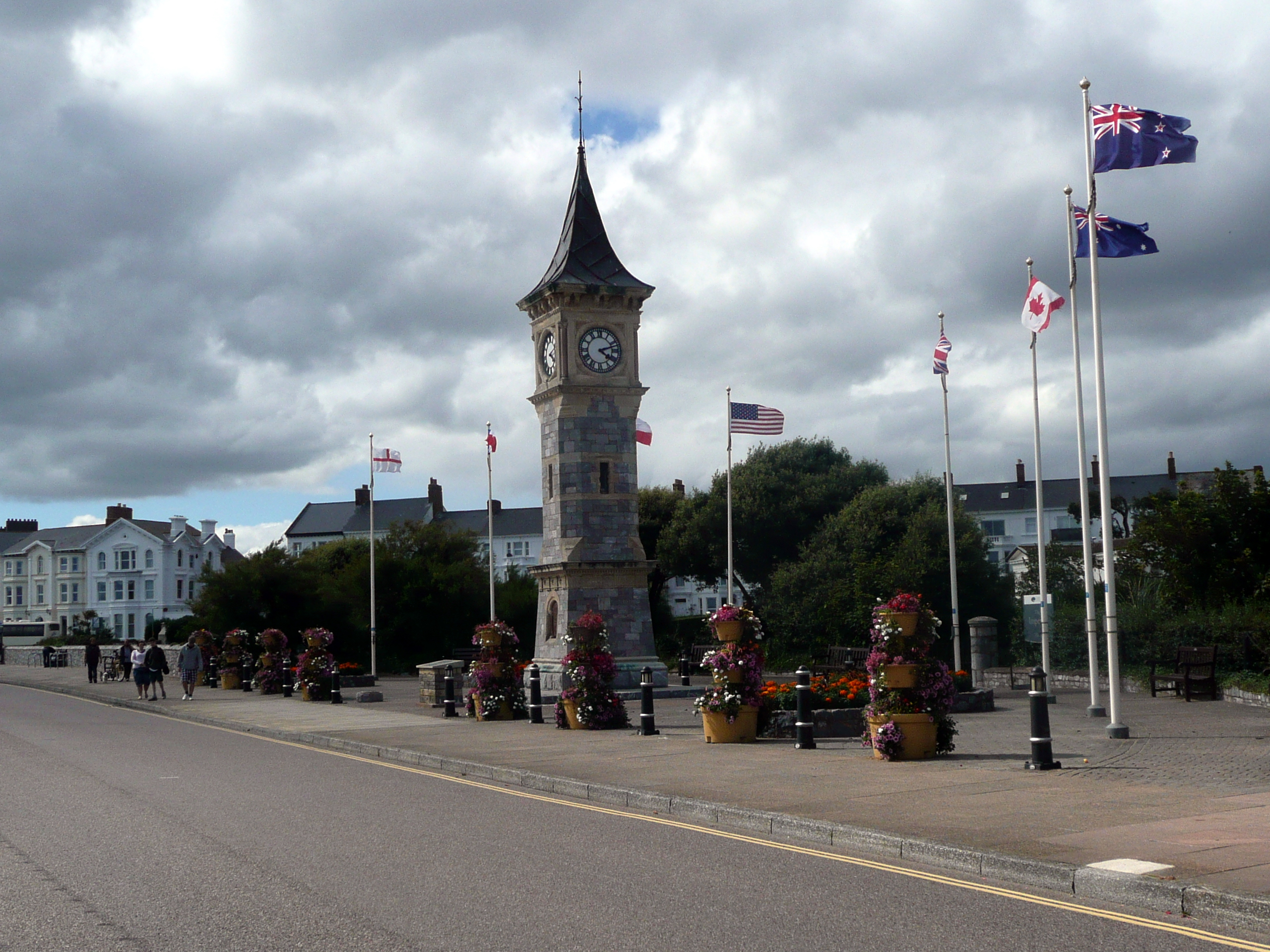
Clock Tower in Exmouth erected in 1897, to commemorate the Diamond Jubilee of Queen Victoria

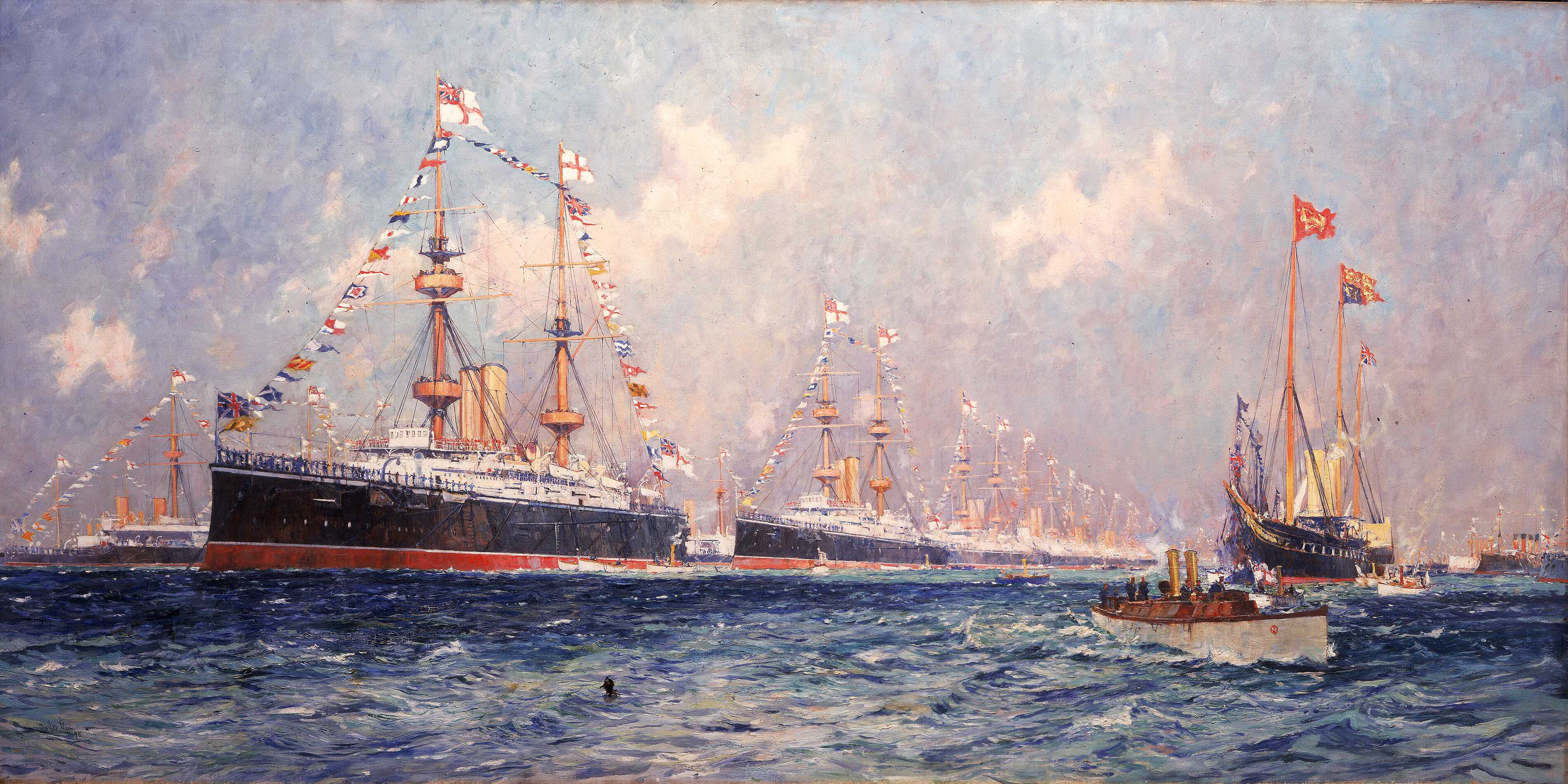
'In Honour of our Queen': Queen Victoria's Diamond Jubilee Review at Spithead, 26 June 1897

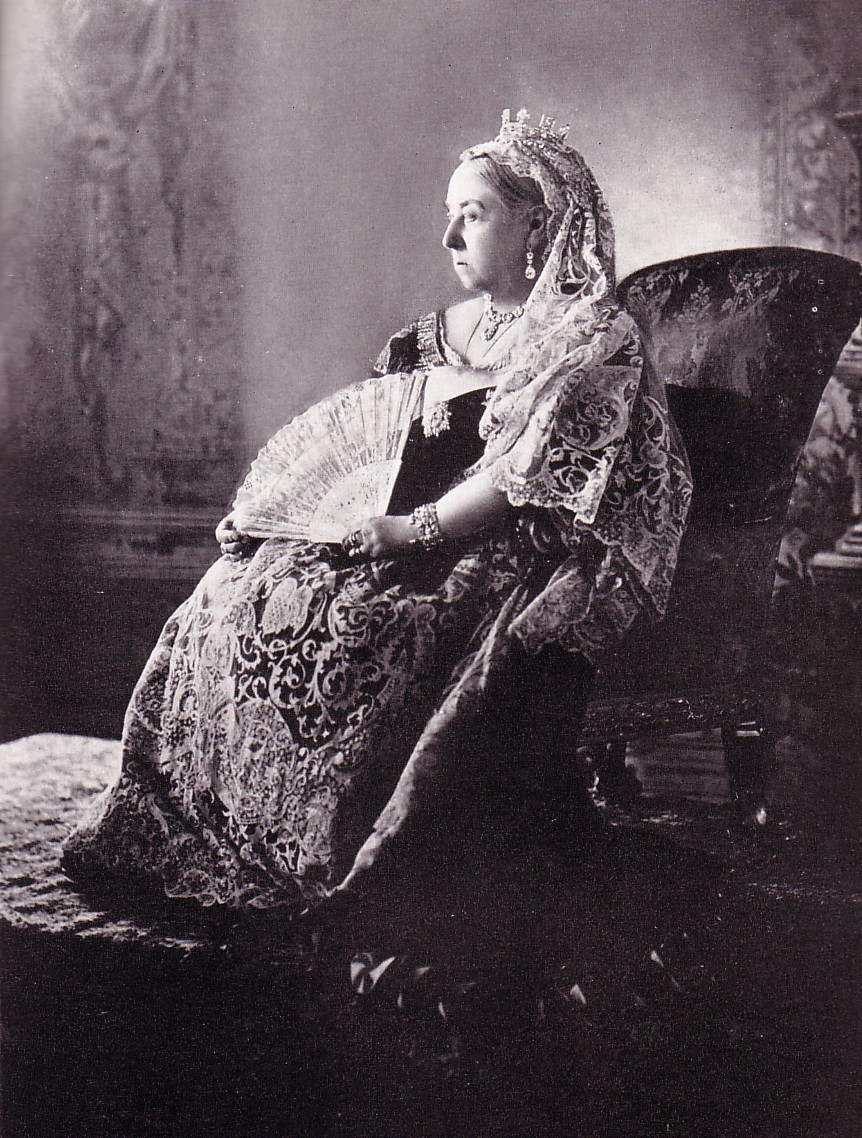
Victoria in her official Diamond Jubilee photograph by W. & D. Downey

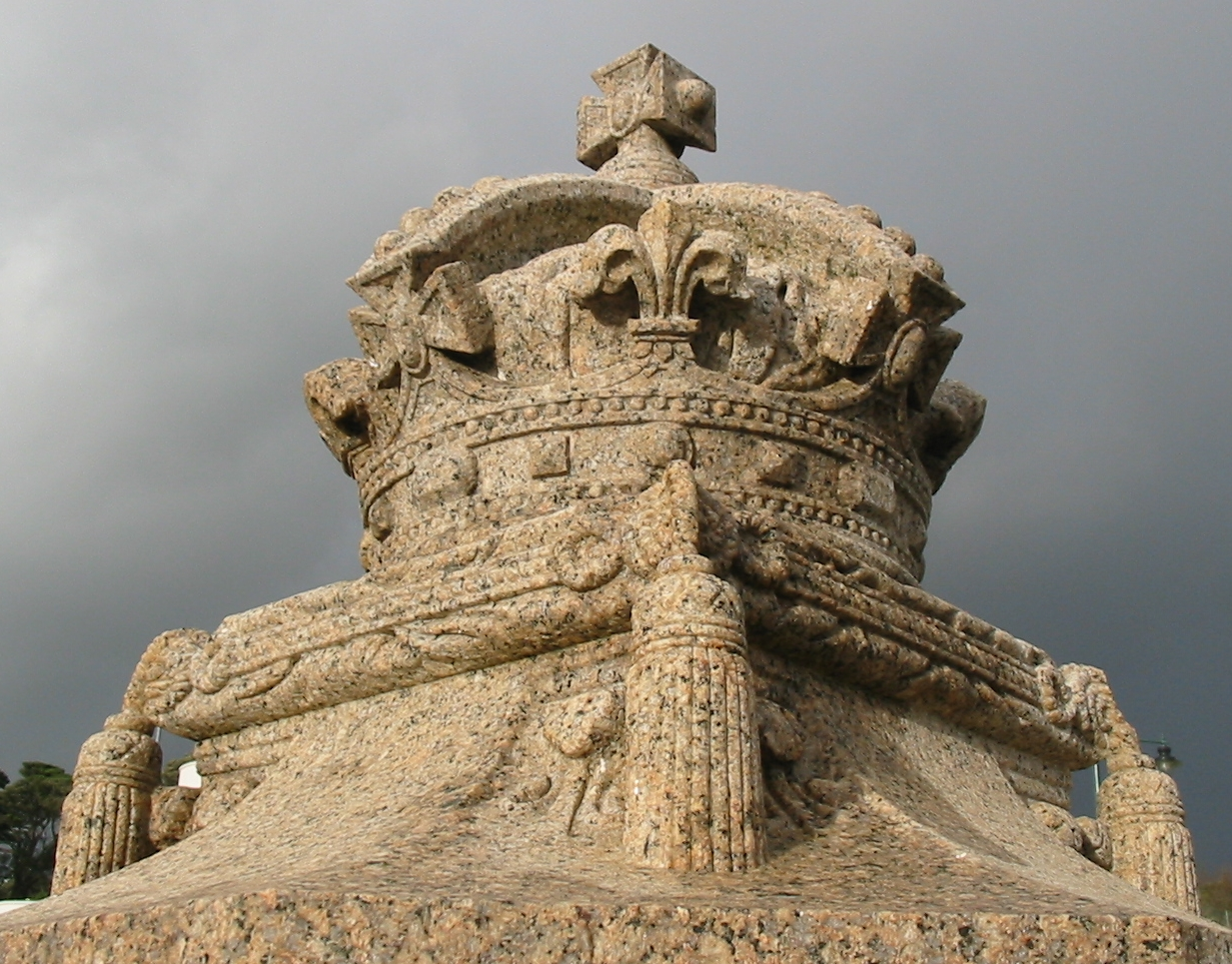
Victoria Avenue Jubilee Crown erected in Jersey for Diamond Jubilee of Queen Victoria, 1897

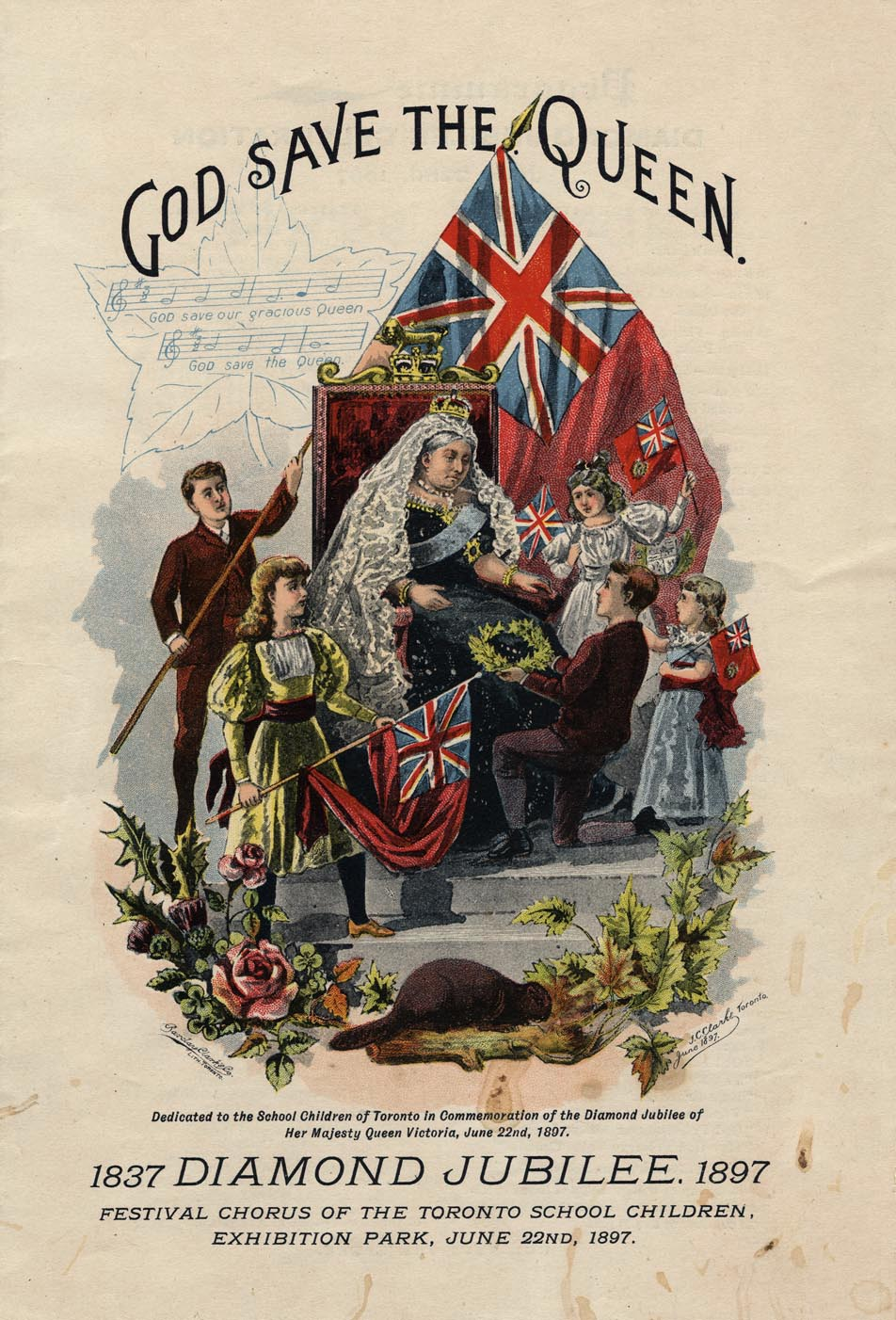
Front cover of a programme for a musical event held at Exhibition Park on June 22, 1897, Toronto, Ontario, Canada in honour of Queen Victoria's Diamond Jubilee

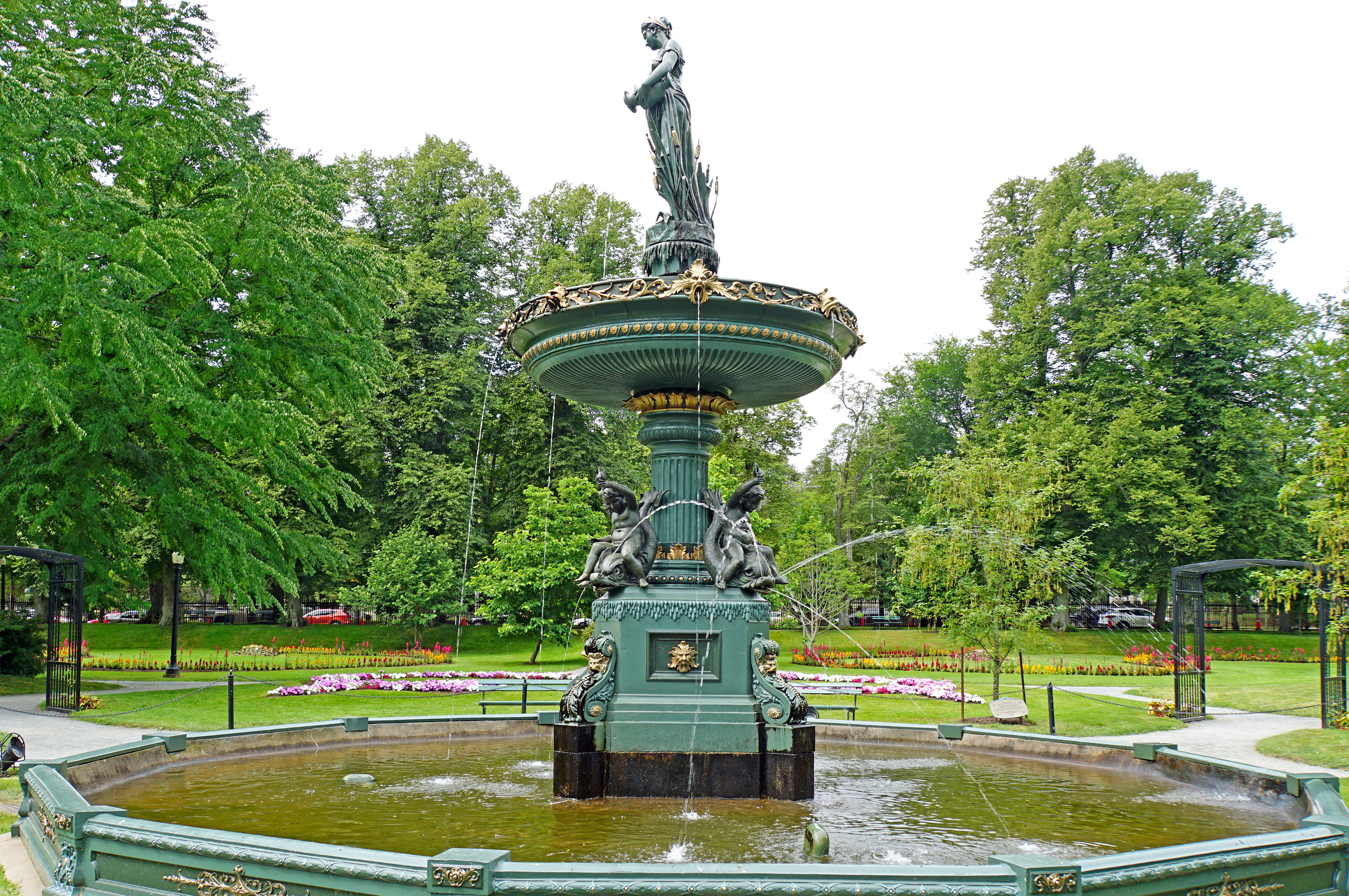
The Victoria Jubilee Fountain at Halifax, Canada, built in 1897 to mark the Diamond Jubilee of Queen Victoria

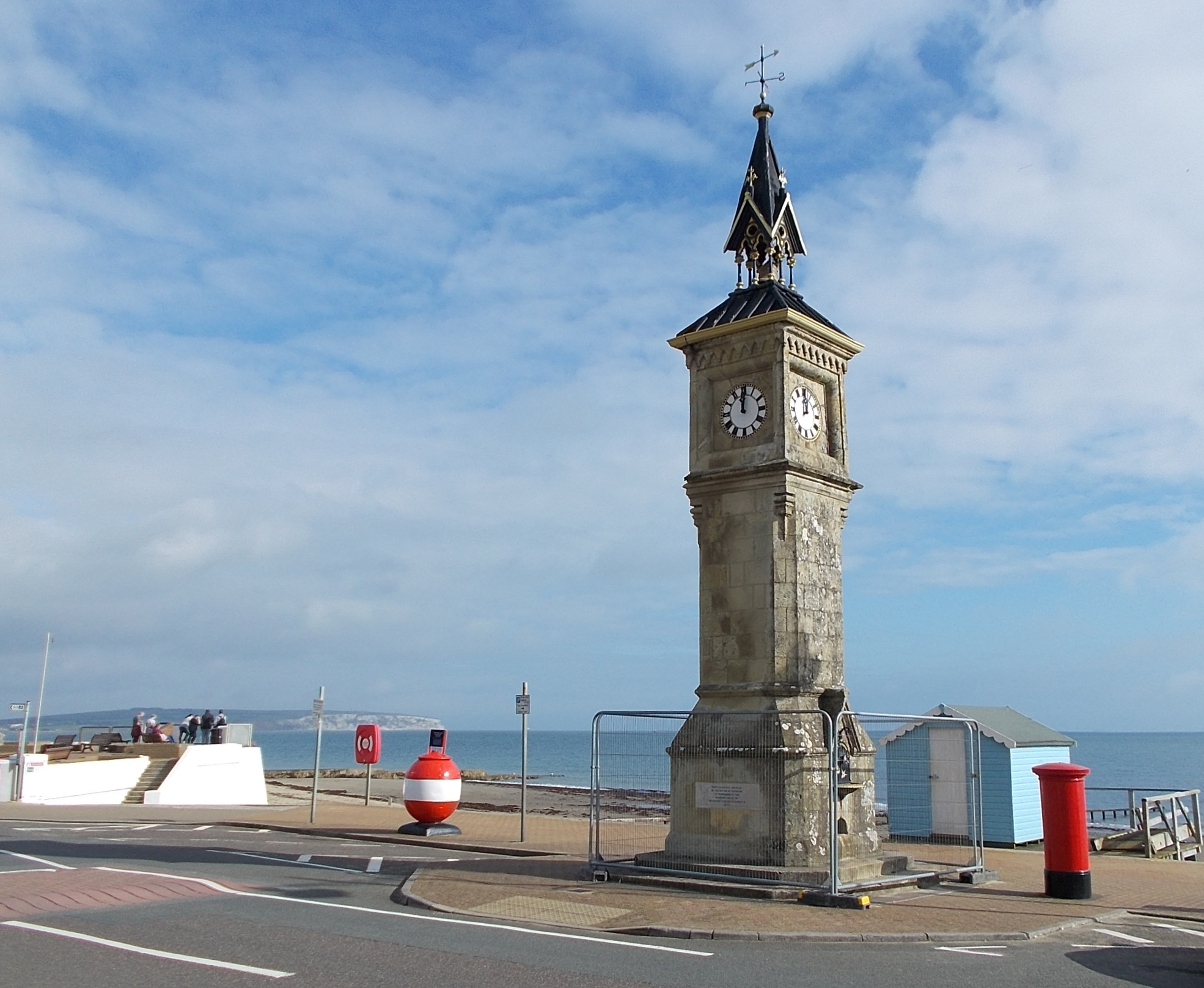
The Clock Tower at Shanklin Esplanade, Isle of Wight, erected to commemorate the Diamond Jubilee of Queen Victoria in 1897

== See also ==
- Queen Victoria Diamond Jubilee Medal
- 1897 Diamond Jubilee Honours
- Victoria and Merrie England
