= Count von Gleichen =

The title Countess von Gleichen was created by the Duke of Saxe-Coburg and Gotha in 1861 for Laura Seymour, morganatic wife of Prince Victor of Hohenlohe-Langenburg, a German prince and nephew of the British Queen Victoria. Prince Victor is sometimes also identified as Count Gleichen, jure uxoris. After Princess Victor's death her title passed to her only son Count Edward. In 1917, when British citizens were required to relinquish all German titles, the Gleichen family retained their name but gave up their comital status, instead taking the precedence of children of a British marquess, allowing them to be styled Lord and Lady. This title and status had earlier been given to Princess Victor when her brother had inherited the title Marquess of Hertford.

Count/Countess von Gleichen may refer to:

- Prince Victor of Hohenlohe-Langenburg, Count von Gleichen jure uxoris
- Princess Victor of Hohenlohe-Langenburg, Countess von Gleichen
- Lord Edward Gleichen, formerly known as Count Edward Gleichen
- Lady Feodora Gleichen, formerly known as Countess Feodora Gleichen
- Lady Valda Machell, formerly known as Countess Valda Gleichen
- Lady Helena Gleichen, formerly known as Countess Helena Gleichen
