= Social and Personal =

Column in The Irish Times newspaper

Social and Personal is a long-running column in The Irish Times. Previously called Court and Personal it originally published the Court Circulars of the British royal family, the Lord Lieutenant of Ireland and brief society reporting details of which members of the upper class were available in their Dublin townhouses to receive callers.

== Court and Personal ==
Following the Partition of Ireland in 1921, the column covered the Governor-General of the Irish Free State and Governor of Northern Ireland, with entries placed, as for the Lord Lieutenant, below entries about the royal family. The 1937 Constitution of Ireland established the office of President of Ireland, whose holder should "take precedence over all other persons in the State". The Fianna Fáil government criticised the column for listing President Douglas Hyde's engagements after those of the Royal Family and others, including leading members of the former Protestant Ascendancy — what Frank Aiken called "every hyphenated person in the country". The agreed solution was to place items about the President elsewhere in the paper. In 1942 the government used its wartime censorship powers to remove the column altogether, on the grounds that it compromised the state's neutrality.

== Social and Personal ==
Following the declaration of the Republic in 1949 the column ceased to mention British royalty and gradually stopped mentioning aristocracy. The name was changed to "Social and Personal". Until around 1978 it published a daily list of who met the President of Ireland in Áras an Uachtaráin. The reasons why it stopped doing this remain unclear; President Patrick Hillery suggested that the paper stopped publishing the information it was being supplied, while the paper said it had stopped receiving information from the Áras.

Today the column only appears occasionally, to enable prominent families to announce forthcoming nuptials, and frequently goes for weeks without being included in the paper. Whereas the column once received extensive space every day, it now occupies only one or two inches of space on the "Letters to the Editor" page if space allows, and often only contains one entry.

== Sources ==
- Murphy, Brian (2016). "The Foundations of Presidential Precedence". Forgotten Patriot: Douglas Hyde and the Foundation of the Irish Presidency. Collins Press. pp. 120–159. ISBN 9781848892903.
