= Lord Edward Gleichen =

British Army general

Major-General Lord Edward Gleichen KCVO CB CMG DSO
- Born: Count Albert Edward Wilfred von Gleichen; 15 January 1863; London, England
- Died: 14 December 1937 (aged 74)
- Burial place: Forest Row, Sussex
- Spouse: Sylvia Gay Edwardes
- Military career
- Allegiance: United Kingdom
- Branch: British Army
- Service years: 1881–1919
- Rank: Major-General
- Unit: Grenadier Guards
- Commands: 15th Infantry Brigade; 37th Division
- Conflicts: Mahdist War; Second Boer War; Battle of Modder River; First World War

Major-General Lord Albert Edward Wilfred Gleichen KCVO CB CMG DSO (15 January 1863 – 14 December 1937) was a British courtier and soldier.

== Early life and family history ==
Born as Count Albert Edward Wilfred von Gleichen, he was the only son of Prince Victor of Hohenlohe-Langenburg (a half-nephew of Queen Victoria) and his wife, Laura Williamina (a sister of the 5th Marquess of Hertford). Lady Feodora Gleichen, the noted sculptor, was his sister.

Gleichen's comital title, shared by his sisters, derived from his mother, who had received it from Ernst II, Duke of Saxe-Coburg and Gotha, shortly before her morganatic marriage to his father. Gleichen had been an hereditary estate of the Princes of Hohenlohe in Germany since 1631, and their father voluntarily used it as a comital title to place himself on the same social footing as his wife. But Edward was not entitled to any land or revenues derived from this dynastic property.

On 15 December 1885, the Court Circular announced Queen Victoria's permission for Edward's mother to share his father's rank at the Court of St James's, and henceforth they were known as TSH Prince and Princess Victor of Hohenlohe-Langenburg. But the Queen did not extend that privilege to their children, although she confirmed use of their German style as count and countesses. On 12 June 1913 Edward was granted precedence before marquesses in the peerage of England (while his sisters were granted precedence before the daughters of dukes in the English peerage).

== Early military career ==
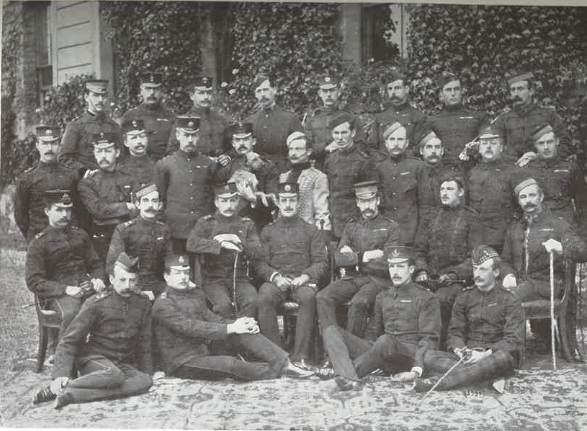
The Staff College, Camberley, class in 1890. Stood in the second row, second from the left, is Edward Gleichen.

Gleichen served as a Page of Honour to the Queen from 1874 to 1879.

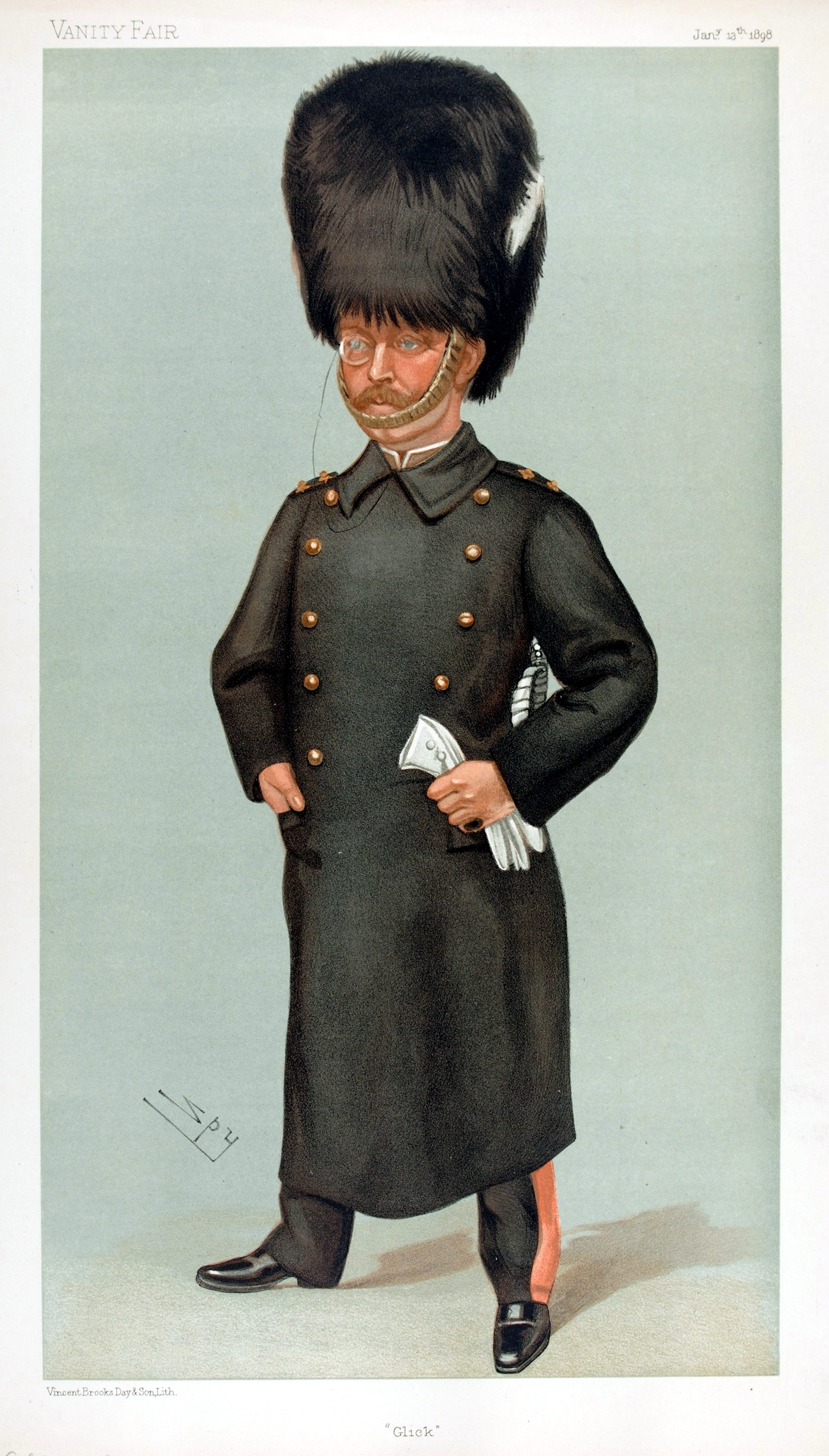
"Glick" Count Gleichen as caricatured by Spy (Leslie Ward) in Vanity Fair, January 1898

After graduating from the Royal Military College, Sandhurst, he was commissioned into the Grenadier Guards as a lieutenant in October 1881 and gradually rose through the ranks over the years, eventually becoming a major general. He served in the short-lived Guards Camel Corps in the Sudan campaign in 1884–85 and, after attending the Staff College, Camberley, from 1890–1891, and gaining his psc, with the Egyptian Army in the Dongala campaign in 1896.

After having served at the War Office as a staff captain, Gleichen was, in May 1898, made a deputy assistant adjutant general there. In 1899–1900 he served in the Second Boer War in South Africa, and was mentioned in despatches for his actions during the Battle of Modder River on 28 November 1899. In January 1900 he was appointed deputy assistant-adjutant-general to the forces in South Africa.

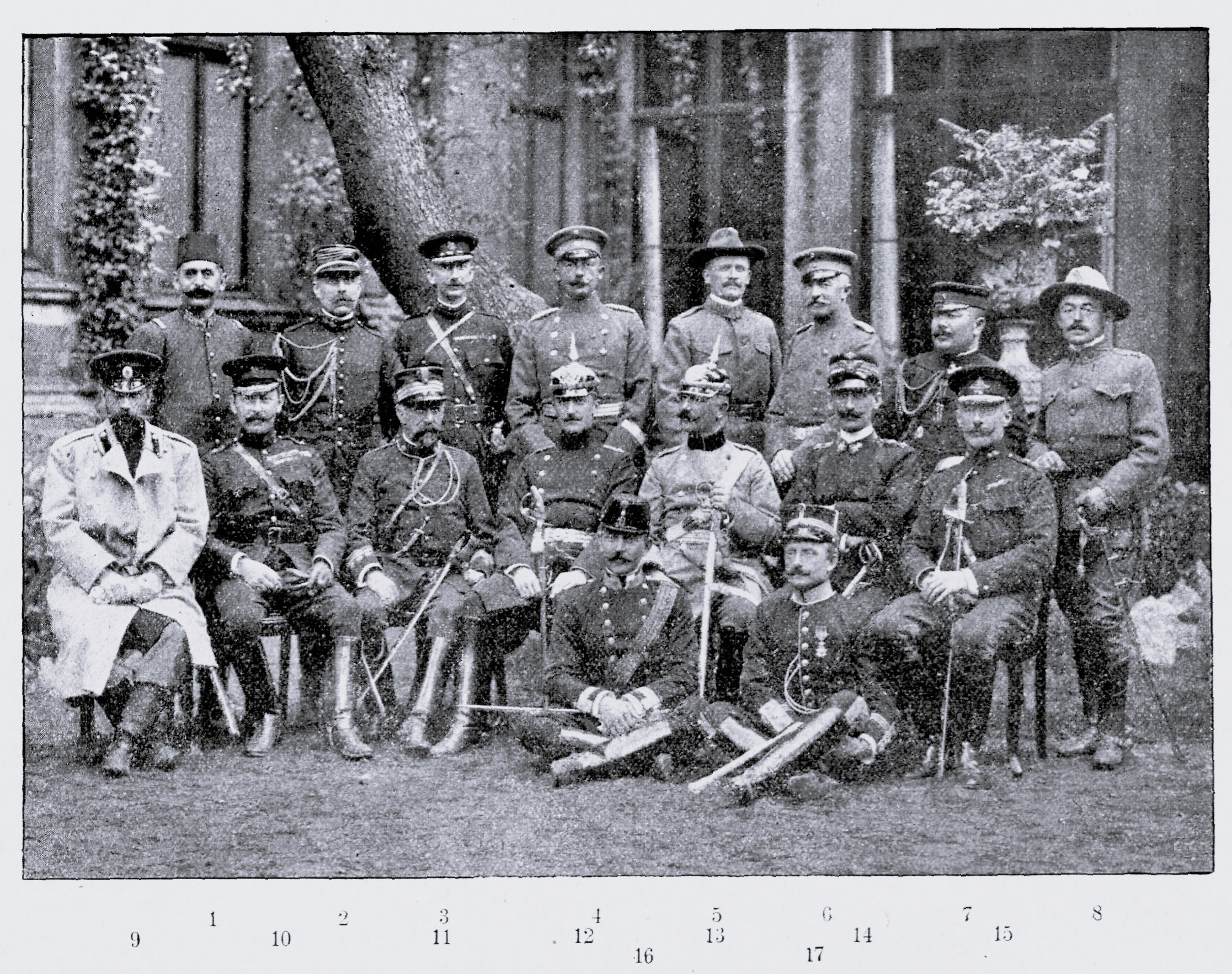
Foreign military attachés at the Kaisermanöver (1904), British Attaché Colonel Gleichen is shown at (10)

He was Sudan agent in Cairo from 1901 to 1903 with the local rank of lieutenant colonel, After serving on half-pay, he became military attaché to Berlin, which he held from October 1903 until 1906. He and Kaiser Wilhelm II fell out, and Gleichen, promoted in October 1906 to brevet colonel, was sent to be military attaché in Washington D.C. from 1906 to 1907. He met the Wright brothers while in Washington and wrote a report on their aircraft, but also failed to form a relationship with U.S. President Teddy Roosevelt. He was assistant director of military operations from 1907 to 1911.

In August 1911 he succeeded Alexander Wilson as general officer commanding (GOC) of the 15th Infantry Brigade and was granted the temporary rank of brigadier general whilst he held this appointment.

== First World War ==
During the First World War, which began in the summer of 1914, Gleichen commanded his brigade as part of the 5th Division of the original British Expeditionary Force (BEF). Throughout the remaining months of 1914, Gleichen led the brigade during the Battle of Mons and the subsequent Great Retreat, the Battle of Le Cateau, and later at the Marne and the Aisne. His brigade was later heavily engaged at the Battle of La Bassée and the First Battle of Ypres. On 16 February 1915, he was promoted to major general "for services rendered in connection with Operations in the Field", for his distinguished conduct in the war so far, yet he remained with his brigade for another few weeks.

In April, Gleichen was appointed GOC of the newly formed 37th Division, a Kitchener's Army formation stationed in England. After supervising the division's training on Salisbury Plain, he led it to the Western Front in July 1915 and commanded it through the Battle of the Somme the following year, eventually relinquishing his post in October 1916.

From 1917 to 1918, he served as the Director of the Intelligence Bureau at the Department of Information.

== Post-war and final years ==
He served as Chairman of the Permanent Committee on Geographical Names from 1919. He retired from the army in October 1919.

At court, the Count was appointed an Extra Equerry to King Edward VII in July 1901.

He wrote a number of books, including:

- With the Camel Corps up the Nile (1888)
- With the Mission to Menelik, 1897 (1898)
- The Doings of the Fifteenth Infantry Brigade, August 1914 to March 1915 (1917)
- London's Open Air Statuary (1928)
- A Guardsman's Memories (1932)

He was the editor of:

- Anglo-Egyptian Sudan: a compendium prepared by officers of the Sudan Government - Vol. I: Geographical, descriptive and historical. - 1905. Vol.II: Routes.- 1905. Suppl.: 1906

== Change of title ==
When King George V commanded his German relatives domiciled in Britain to Anglicize their names and titles in 1917, the Gleichens' 1913 precedence was reduced several grades to that of younger son/daughters of a marquess in the peerage of the United Kingdom. This was because only marquisal rank was conferred upon the King's nearer, heretofore princely relatives, the Tecks and Battenbergs. Although inexplicably allowed to retain their German surname, the Gleichens relinquished use of the comital title and on 12 September 1917 acquired the prefix of Lord or Lady, although this was not made hereditary for Edward's descendants as his countship had been.

On 2 July 1910, Gleichen married Sylvia Gay Edwardes (a niece of the 4th Baron Kensington), who was a maid of honour to Queens Victoria and Alexandra. They had no children. He is buried at Holy Trinity Church burial ground, Forest Row, Sussex, England.

In her memoirs, his sister Lady Helena Gleichen described a sad incident that happened at Overstone Hall. A "particularly nice" butler named Atkins tried to learn how to swim in the nearby lake, but disappeared. Lord Edward dived after him numerous times, but was unable to save him. In the end, his body was retrieved.

== Honours and awards ==
British decorations

- CMG: Companion of the Order of St Michael and St George – 1898 – for his contributions on a Mission to Ethiopia.
- DSO: Companion of the Distinguished Service Order – 29 November 1900 – for his contributions in the Second Boer War.
- CVO: Commander of the Royal Victorian Order – 2 February 1901 – on the day of the funeral of Queen Victoria
- CB: Companion of the Order of the Bath – 1906
- KCVO: Knight Commander of the Royal Victorian Order – 1909

Foreign decorations

- 1897: Order of the Star of Ethiopia (Third Class) – for his contributions on a Mission to Ethiopia.
- 1905: Order of the Medjidie (Second Class) – for his services in the Egyptian Army
- Unknown dates: Commander of the Legion of Honour, Order of the Dannebrog (First Class)

Court offices
Preceded by Hon. George Somerset	Page of Honour; 1874–1879	Succeeded by Frederic Kerr
Military offices
Preceded by W. H. H. Waters	Military Attaché; 1903–1906	Succeeded by J. A. Trench
Titles of nobility
Preceded by Princess Victor of Hohenlohe-Langenburg	Count von Gleichen; 1912–1917	Succeeded by Title relinquished
