= Prince Victor of Hohenlohe-Langenburg =

Royal Navy Admiral and a sculptor (1833–1891)

Prince Victor
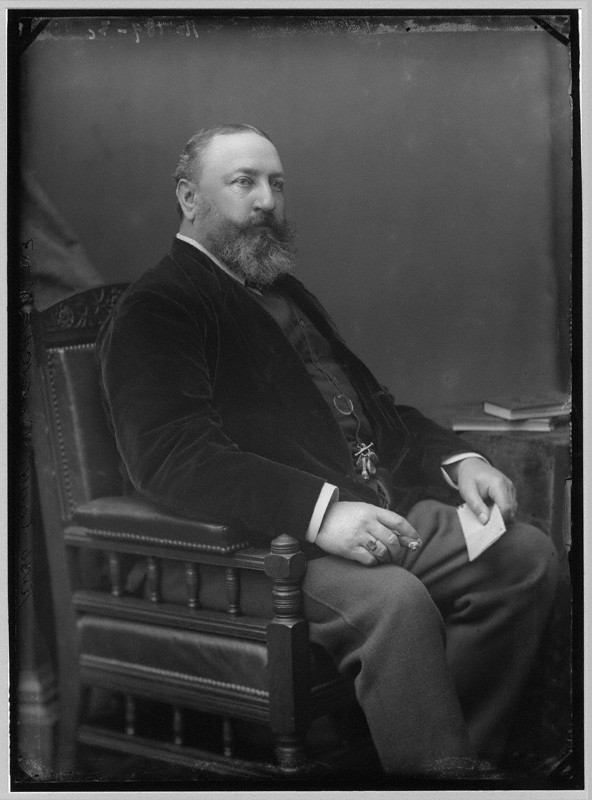
- Born: Victor Ferdinand Franz Eugen Gustaf Adolf Constantin Friedrich; 11 December 1833
- Died: 31 December 1891 (aged 58)
- Spouse: Laura Seymour, Countess von Gleichen (m. 1861)
- Issue: Lady Feodora Gleichen; Lord Edward Gleichen; Lady Valda Gleichen; Lady Helena Gleichen
- Father: Ernst I, Prince of Hohenlohe-Langenburg
- Mother: Princess Feodora of Leiningen

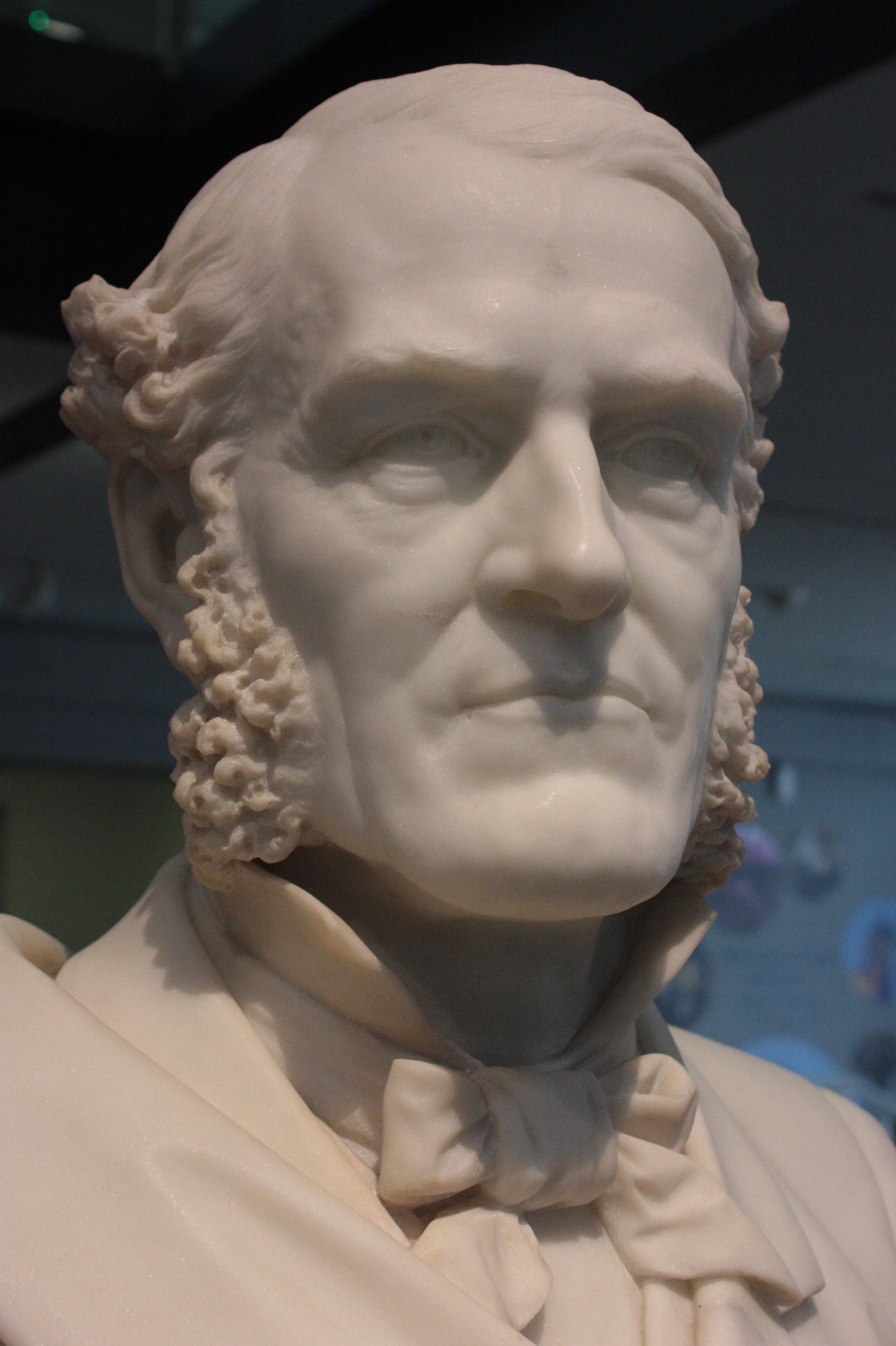
Commodore James Graham Goodenough by Count Gleichen,1877

Admiral Prince Victor Ferdinand Franz Eugen Gustaf Adolf Constantin Friedrich of Hohenlohe-Langenburg, GCB (11 December 1833 – 31 December 1891), also known as Count von Gleichen, was an officer in the Royal Navy, and a sculptor.

== Biography ==
He was born at Langenburg in Württemberg, the third son of Ernst I, Prince of Hohenlohe-Langenburg and Princess Feodora of Leiningen. His mother was Queen Victoria's half-sister, and his family was therefore closely related to the British royal family.

Victor (sometimes spelled Viktor) became an officer in the British Royal Navy in 1848 and was promoted to lieutenant in 1854. As a lieutenant at the time of the Crimean War, he served on the first-rate HMS St Jean d'Acre in the Mediterranean under Captain Henry Keppel in 1855; commanded the gunboat HMS Traveller for a few months in 1856 after her launch until she was paid off; served again under Keppel again on the fourth-rate HMS Raleigh in the East Indies and China, until she was wrecked near Macau in 1857. He was recommended for the Victoria Cross for his service in China in 1856. He was promoted to commander in 1857, and commanded the first-rate sloop HMS Scourge in the Mediterranean. Promoted to captain in 1859, he took command of the 21-gun corvette HMS Racoon from commissioning in 1863 until 1866, during which time Queen Victoria's second son, Alfred, Duke of Edinburgh (1844–1900) served on board as a lieutenant.

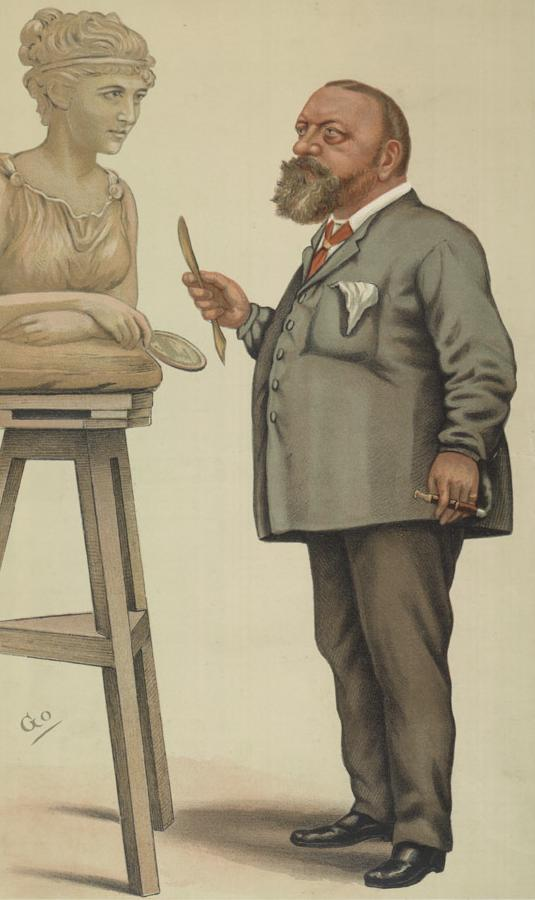
Gleichen by Franz Goedecker, 1884

He retired from active service in 1866, and was appointed Knight Commander of the Order of the Bath (KCB) that year (advanced to GCB in 1887). In retirement, he was promoted to the rank of Retired Rear admiral in December 1876, and advanced to Retired Vice admiral on 23 November 1881 and to Retired Admiral on 24 May 1887. From 1867, he held the honorary title of Governor and Constable of Windsor Castle.

Prince Victor resumed use of his native title, "HSH Prince Victor of Hohenlohe-Langenburg" in December 1885, when Queen Victoria authorised his wife to share his princely style at the Court of St. James's instead of bearing her lower, morganatic title. He died in London, before his children were obliged by King George V in 1917 to exchange their German comital titles for British courtesy titles during World War I. He was buried at Sunningdale.

== Works ==
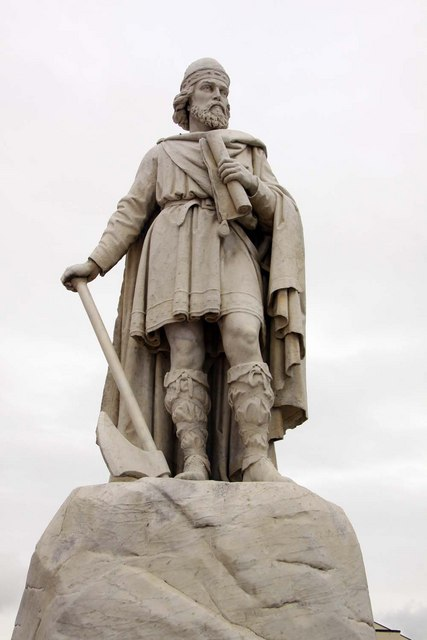
Statue of Alfred the Great, Wantage

He became a sculptor after retiring from the Navy.

Examples of his work include

- the huge statue of King Alfred in the market square of Wantage, Oxfordshire.
- the Black Angel corbels and shields on the roof of the Banqueting Hall of The Convent, Gibraltar carved in 1863 with monograms of the Kings and Queens of Great Britain and Spain who were in possession of Gibraltar.
- the bust of Mary Seacole made in 1871, in the Institute of Jamaica in Kingston, Jamaica.
- the statue of Queen Victoria in the North quadrangle of Royal Holloway College, University of London, Egham, Surrey.
- the bust of Queen Victoria on the Jubilee Memorial, Gateacre, Liverpool
- the statue of Thomas Holloway with his wife Jane, in the South quadrangle of Royal Holloway College, University of London, Egham, Surrey.
- the statue of Frederick Gye at the Royal Opera House, Covent Garden, London, 1880.
- the bust of Admiral of the Fleet Sir Henry Keppel (with whom the artist served) in the Wellington Room at the Institute of Directors, 116 Pall Mall, London.
- the bust of Commodore James Graham Goodenough at the National Maritime Museum, Greenwich.
- Statue of HIH The Prince Imperial of France at the Royal Military Academy Sandhurst Historic England Description 1883

== Family ==
He married Laura Williamina Seymour, the younger daughter of Admiral Sir George Francis Seymour (under whom he served on HMS Cumberland in the 1850s) on 24 January 1861 in London. Shortly before his morganatic marriage, his wife was created Countess von Gleichen, after Gleichen which was at one stage owned by a branch of the Hohenlohe family. They had four children:

- Countess Feodora (Feo) Georgina Maud Gleichen (20 December 1861 – 22 February 1922)
- Count Albert Edward Wilfred Gleichen (15 January 1863 – 13 December 1937) he married The Honorable Sylvia Edwardes on 2 July 1910,
- Countess Victoria (Valda) Alice Leopoldina Ada Laura Gleichen (28 November 1868 – 10 September 1951) she married Lt.-Col. Percy Machell (nephew and heir of James Octavius Machell) on 5 December 1905. They had one son:
  - Roger Victor Machell (23 July 1908 – 18 January 1984)
- Countess Helena Emily Gleichen (1 February 1873 – 28 January 1947)

Prince Victor's only son Edward, also known as Count Gleichen, became a major general in the British Army.

== Legacy ==
A popular legend, confirmed in his daughter Helena's biography, was that Count von Gleichen was responsible for the introduction of the smoking room at Windsor Castle. As Queen Victoria had forbidden gentlemen from smoking in her residences, Count von Gleichen discreetly smoked his pipe into his chimney. Unfortunately, his bedroom was underneath the Queen's and so the smoke and smell of tobacco flew into the Queen's bedroom through her chimney. Afterwards, the Queen remonstrated Count von Gleichen but arranged for a smoking room to be built in another part of the castle.

== Ancestry ==
Ancestors of Prince Victor of Hohenlohe-Langenburg

16. Ludwig, Prince of Hohenlohe-Langenburg
8. Christian Albrecht, Prince of Hohenlohe-Langenburg
17. Countess Eleonore of Nassau-Saarbrücken
4. Carl Ludwig III, Prince of Hohenlohe-Langenburg
18. Friedrich Karl, Prince of Stolberg-Gedern
9. Princess Caroline of Stolberg-Gedern
19. Countess Louise of Nassau-Saarbrücken
2. Ernst I, Prince of Hohenlohe-Langenburg
20. Johann Carl, Count of Solms-Baruth
10. Johann Christian II, Count of Solms-Baruth
21. Countess Luise of Lippe-Biesterfeld
5. Countess Amalie Henriette of Solms-Baruth
22. Heinrich VI, Count Reuss of Köstritz
11. Countess Friederike Luise Reuss of Köstritz
23. Anna Fraçoise Henriette Louise de Casado
1. Prince Victor of Hohenlohe-Langenburg
24. Friedrich Magnus, Count of Leiningen-Dagsburg-Hartenburg
12. Carl, Prince of Leiningen
25. Countess Anna of Wurmbrand-Stuppach
6. Emich Carl, Prince of Leiningen
26. Wilhelm, Count of Solms-Rödelheim und Assenheim
13. Countess Christiane of Solms-Rödelheim und Assenheim
27. Countess Maria Anna of Wurmbrand-Stuppach
3. Princess Feodora of Leiningen
28. Ernest Frederick, Duke of Saxe-Coburg-Saalfeld
14. Francis, Duke of Saxe-Coburg-Saalfeld
29. Duchess Sophie Antoinette of Brunswick-Wolfenbüttel
7. Princess Victoria of Saxe-Coburg-Saalfeld
30. Heinrich XXIV, Count Reuss of Ebersdorf
15. Countess Augusta Reuss of Ebersdorf
31. Countess Karoline Ernestine of Erbach-Schönberg

Honorary titles
Preceded by Prince Albert of Saxe-Coburg and Gotha	Governor of Windsor Castle; 1867–1891	Succeeded by John Campbell, 9th Duke of Argyll
