= Gleichen =

Coordinates: 50°52′04″N 10°51′03″E

Gleichen (German pronunciation: [ˈɡlaɪçn̩]) is the name of two groups of castles in Germany, thus named from their resemblance to each other (German: gleich = like, or resembling).

== Castles in Thuringia between Gotha and Erfurt ==
The first is a group of three (hence called "die drei [three] Gleichen"), each situated on a hill in Thuringia between Gotha and Erfurt. One of these called Gleichen, the Wanderslebener Gleiche (1221 ft. above the sea), was besieged unsuccessfully by the emperor Henry IV in 1088. It was the seat of a line of counts, one of whom, Ernest III, a crusader, is the subject of a romantic legend. Having been captured, he was released from his imprisonment by a Turkish woman, who returned with him to Germany and became his wife, a papal dispensation allowing him to live with two wives at the same time (see Reineck, Die Sage von der Doppelehe eines Grafen von Gleichen, 1891). After belonging to the elector of Mainz the castle became the property of Prussia in 1803. The second castle is called Mühlburg (1309 ft. above the sea). This existed as early as 704 and was besieged by Henry IV in 1087. It came into the hands of Prussia in 1803. The third castle, Wachsenburg (1358 ft.), was still inhabited in 1911 and contained a collection of weapons and pictures belonging to its owner, the duke of Saxe-Coburg-Gotha, whose family obtained possession of it in 1368. It was built about 935 (see Beyer, Die drei Gleichen, Erfurt, 1898).

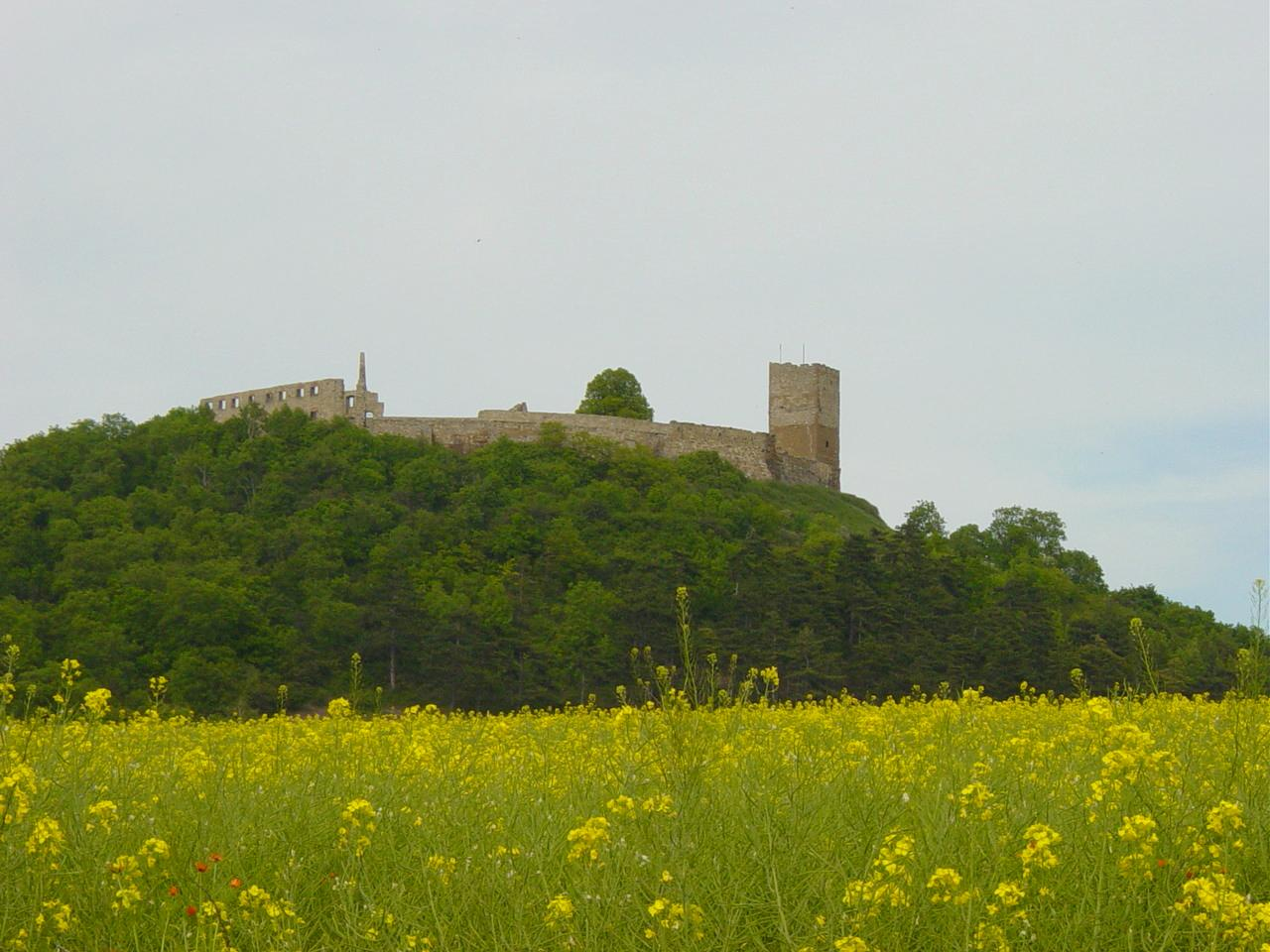
Gleichen

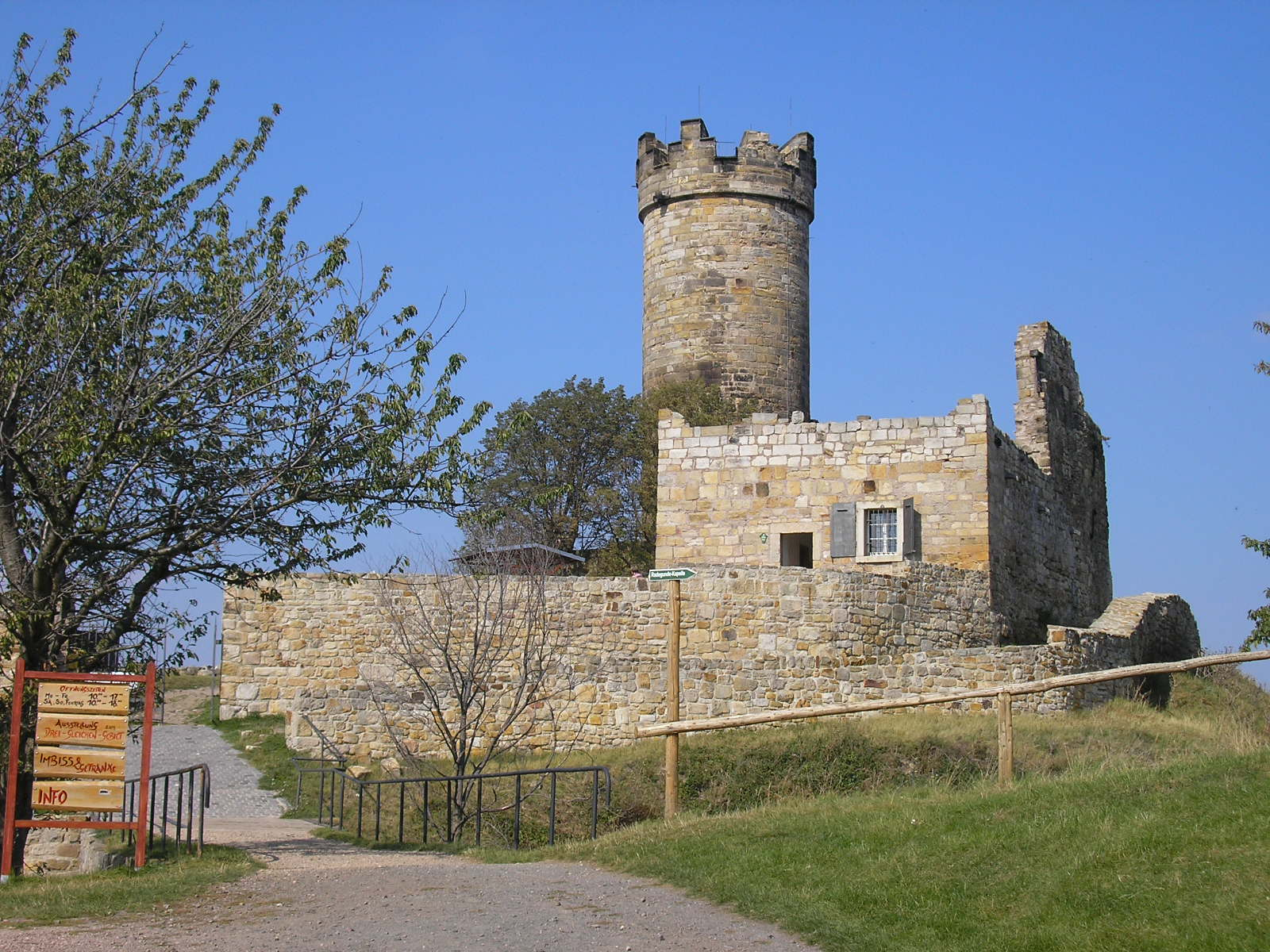
Mühlburg

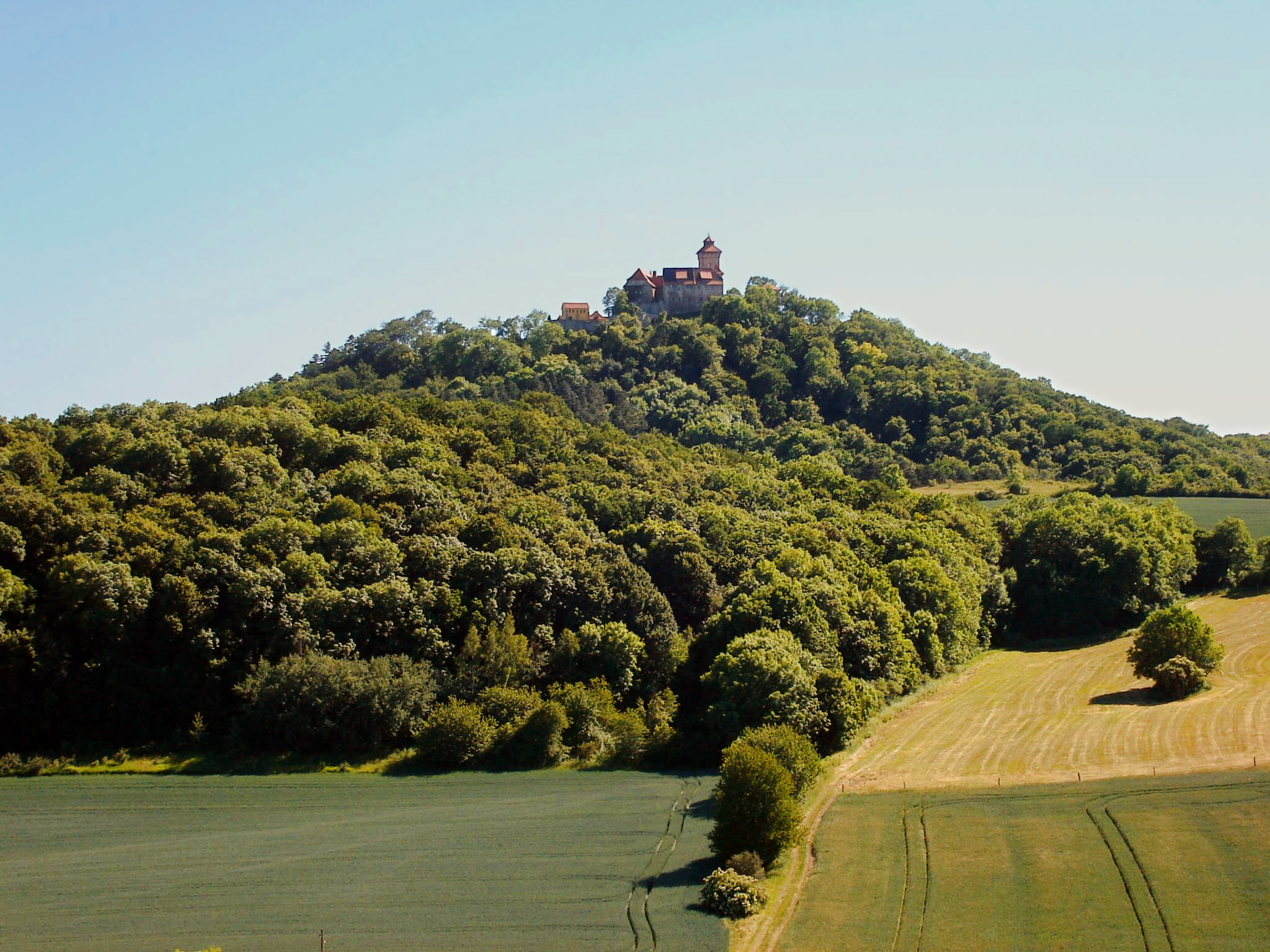
Wachsenburg

== Castles near Göttingen ==
The other group consists of two castles, Neuen-Gleichen and Alten-Gleichen. The former is in ruins, while the latter is barely discernible under the forest cover. They crown two hills south-east of Göttingen, over Bremke.

== The family name of Gleichen ==
The name of Gleichen is taken by the family descended from Prince Victor of Hohenlohe-Langenburg through his marriage with Laura Wilhelmina Seymour, sister of the 5th Marquess of Hertford and daughter of Admiral Sir George Francis Seymour. A branch of the Hohenlohe family at one time owned part of the county of Gleichen.
