= Lady Helena Gleichen =

English painter

Lady Helena Emily Gleichen
- Portrait of Lady Helena Gleichen from the Imperial War Museums
- Born: 1 February 1873; London, United Kingdom
- Died: 28 January 1947 (aged 73); Cam, Gloucestershire, United Kingdom
- Known for: Painting, radiography
- Awards: OBE, DStJ

Letter from Lady Helena Gleichen addressing the Tate's query of her use of coal

Lady Helena Emily Gleichen OBE DStJ (1 February 1873 – 28 January 1947) was a British painter of landscapes, flowers, and animals, with a particular passion for horses. During World War I, she served as an ambulance driver and radiographer in France and Italy, where she was given the rank of major in the army. Her awards for her services included the Order of the British Empire.

== Family and early life ==
Her brother, Lord Edward Gleichen (1863–1937), a professional soldier, wrote several books. Her sister, Lady Feodora Gleichen (1861–1922) was a sculptor. They were the children of Count Victor von Gleichen aka Prince Victor of Hohenlohe-Langenburg, a half-nephew of Queen Victoria and himself a sculptor and naval officer, and his morganatic wife Laura Williamina Seymour, a daughter of Admiral Sir George Seymour.

On 15 December 1885, the Court Circular announced the Queen's permission for Helena's mother to share her father's rank at the Court of St James's, and henceforth they were known as TSH Prince and Princess Victor of Hohenlohe-Langenburg. But the Queen did not extend that privilege to their children, although she confirmed use of their German style as count and countesses. On 12 June 1913 Helena and her sisters, the Countesses Feodora and Valda Gleichen, were granted precedence before the daughters of dukes in the peerage of England.

Gleichen was educated privately, then studied in Rollshoven and at Frank Calderon's School of Animal Painting. She also studied under Frank Brangwyn and Arthur Lemon, who both greatly influenced her work. She helped with illustrations for the Younghusband Expedition to Tibet in 1904.

While her father encouraged his daughters to seek out education and build careers for themselves, her mother was more hesitant. As Lady Helena's father died when she was 18, it took two or three years of convincing before her mother allowed her to go study art at Westminster School.

== World War I ==
When World War I began, Gleichen volunteered as an ambulance driver and translator at a British hospital in France in 1915. At the suggestion of a French surgeon, she and her partner Nina Hollings studied radiography in Paris. After being rebuffed by the British and French War Offices, they went to Italy under the Duca d’Aosta, where they were given the rank of major in the Italian Army.

Gleichen headed the 4th Radiographic British Red Cross Unit stationed in the Villa Zucco in Cormons, Italy. She later received the Italian Bronze Medal of Military Valour and was invested as a Dame of Grace of the Order of St John of Jerusalem and as an officer, OBE in 1920. She was a Fellow of the Society of Antiquaries. In early 1918, she abandoned her German titles, accepting demotion by the King to the style and rank of a marquess's daughter.

== Later life and death ==
Gleichen worked from her father's former studio in St James's Palace opposite Friary Court. In 1934 Lady Helena and Nina Hollings purchased Hellens Manor at Much Marcle in Herefordshire, which was used during World War II by the Tate Gallery for the safe storage of art works. They would live here for 9 years, their discovery of the house is described by Lady Helena in her autobiography Contacts and Contrasts. During the war, Gleichen organised her estate staff of some 80 men into a private army, whom she taught military tactics and shooting.

Her memoir, Contacts and Contrasts, illustrated with reproductions of her paintings, was published in 1940. She died in 1947, three days before her 74th birthday. A memorial plaque to her and her siblings is located at Golders Green Crematorium.

Lady Helena never married, or had any children. She travelled through Europe with Nina Hollings for many years and the two starting living together in 1918 in Gloucestershire. The pair moved to Ledbury, Herefordshire in 1939. Historian Marlene Eilers Koenig, and various others, have claimed that the two were lovers, and in a relationship for more than twenty years.

== Ancestry ==
Ancestors of Lady Helena Gleichen

16. Christian Albrecht, Prince of Hohenlohe-Langenburg
8. Carl Ludwig III, Prince of Hohenlohe-Langenburg
17. Princess Caroline of Stolberg-Gedern
4. Ernst I, Prince of Hohenlohe-Langenburg
18. Johann Christian II, Count of Solms-Baruth
9. Countess Amalie Henriette of Solms-Baruth
19. Countess Friederike Luise Reuss of Köstritz
2. Prince Victor of Hohenlohe-Langenburg
20. Carl Friedrich Wilhelm, 1st Prince of Leiningen
10. Emich Carl, 2nd Prince of Leiningen
21. Countess Christiane of Solms-Rödelheim und Assenheim
5. Princess Feodora of Leiningen
22. Francis, Duke of Saxe-Coburg-Saalfeld
11. Princess Victoria of Saxe-Coburg-Saalfeld
23. Countess Augusta Reuss of Ebersdorf
1. Lady Helena Gleichen
24. Francis Seymour-Conway, 1st Marquess of Hertford
12. Lord Hugh Seymour
25. Lady Isabella Fitzroy
6. Sir George Seymour
26. James Waldegrave, 2nd Earl Waldegrave
13. Lady Anne Horatio Waldegrave
27. Maria Walpole
3. Laura Wilhelmina Seymour
28. Augustus Berkeley, 4th Earl of Berkeley
14. Sir George Cranfield Berkeley
29. Elizabeth Drax
7. Georgiana Mary Berkeley
30. Lord George Lennox
15. Emilia Charlotte Lennox
31. Lady Louisa Kerr
