= Lady Feodora Gleichen =

British sculptor (1861–1922)

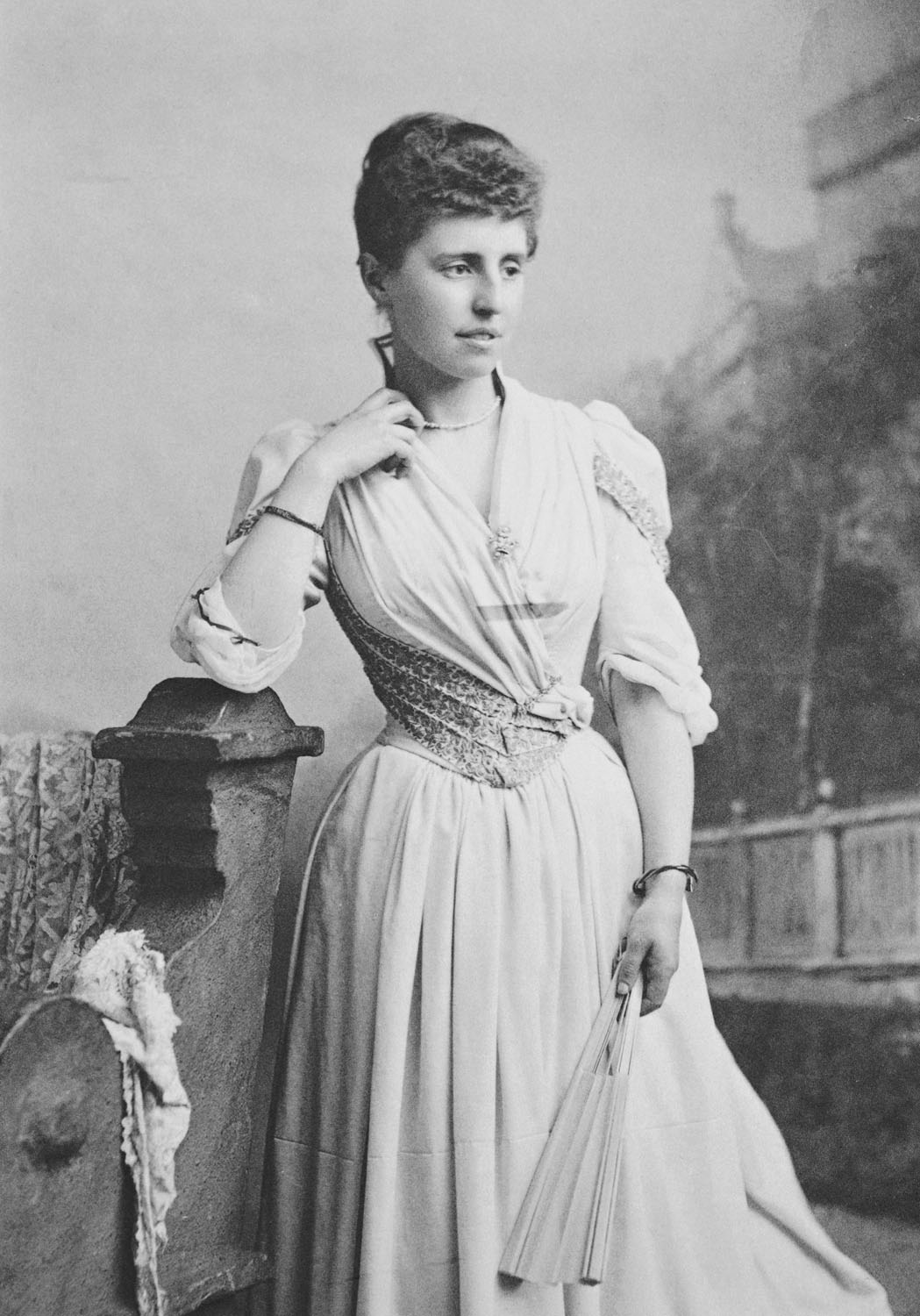
- Born: Countess Feodora Georgina Maud von Gleichen; 20 December 1861; London
- Died: 22 February 1922 (aged 60); St James's Palace, London
- Education: Slade School of Art
- Known for: sculptor
- Awards: Legion of Honour – (1922)

Lady Feodora Georgina Maud Gleichen (20 December 1861 – 22 February 1922) was a British sculptor of figures and portrait busts and designer of decorative objects.

== Background ==
Born Countess Feodora Georgina Maud von Gleichen, she was the eldest daughter of Prince Victor of Hohenlohe-Langenburg (a British naval officer and sculptor and half-nephew of Queen Victoria) and his morganatic wife, Laura Seymour (daughter of Admiral Sir George Seymour, a remote nephew of Henry VIII's Queen Jane Seymour). Within her family she was called Feo. Her father having been largely disinherited at the time of his marriage, he initially adopted his wife's morganatic comital title. The family was taken in by the Queen and given grace and favour accommodation at St James's Palace. Her brother, Lord Edward Gleichen, became a career military officer and author. Her sister, Lady Helena Gleichen, became a portrait painter.

On 15 December 1885, the Court Circular announced the Queen's permission for Feodora's mother to share her father's rank at the Court of St James, and henceforth they were known as TSH Prince and Princess Victor of Hohenlohe-Langenburg. But the queen did not extend that privilege to their four children, although she confirmed use of their German style as count and countesses. In 1889 Feodora and her sisters Valda and Helena were bridesmaids to Louise, Princess Royal, and the Earl of Fife. On 12 June 1913, Feodora and her sisters were granted precedence before the daughters of dukes in the peerage of England by George V.

== Education ==
Gleichen studied art in her father's studio at St. James's and later with Alphonse Legros at the Slade School of Art. While maintaining her father's studio she associated with leading artists such as Sir George Frampton, sculptor of the statue of Peter Pan in Kensington Gardens. She completed her studies in Rome in 1891 and regularly exhibited at the Royal Academy from 1892 and at the New Dudley Gallery.

== Career ==
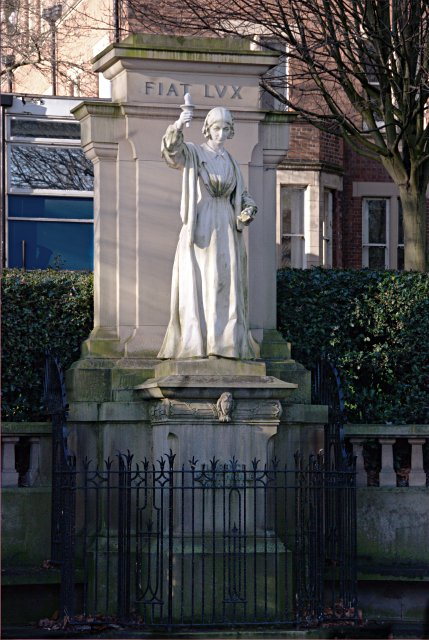
Florence Nightingale - geograph.org.uk - 716771

After her father's death in 1891, she took over his studio in St. James's Palace.

Gleichen was a multidisciplinary artist, creating large sculptures for public venues as well as smaller objects, portrait busts, drawings, small bronzes and bas reliefs. She produced many decorative objects such as frames, chalices and small sculptures, sometimes for the use of the royal family. A bas-relief and hand-mirror in jade and bronze won her a bronze medal in 1900 at the Exposition Universelle in Paris. She also helped with illustrations for the Younghusband Expedition to Tibet in 1904.

== Major works ==
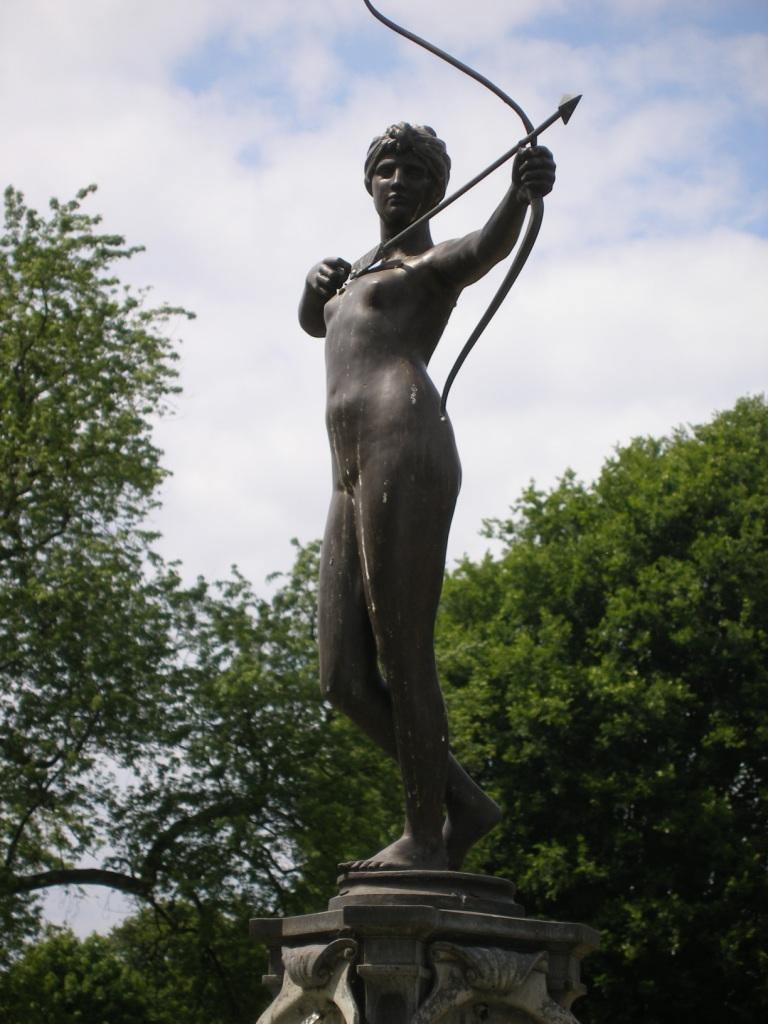
Diana Fountain, Hyde Park, London

- Statue of Queen Victoria surrounded by children, Royal Victoria Hospital, Montreal, Quebec, Canada, 1895.
- 1906 bronze statue of Diana, Rotten Row, Hyde Park, United Kingdom.
- Relief, Art Gallery of New South Wales, Sydney, Australia, 1906.
- King Edward VII memorial, King Edward VII Hospital, Windsor, United Kingdom, 1912.
- Statue of Florence Nightingale, Derbyshire Royal Infirmary, 1914.
- 37th (British) division memorial, Monchy-le-Preux, France, 1921.

== Permanent collections ==
Her 1921 work Head of a Girl is included in the permanent collection of the Tate Gallery. A sculptural relief titled Queen Hatasu of Egypt is included in the permanent collection of the Art Gallery of New South Wales.

== Later life ==
During World War I she abandoned her German titles, accepting demotion by the King to the style and rank of a marquess's daughter, by Royal Warrant of Precedence, pursuant to the King's dynastic reform of titles and names during establishment of the House of Windsor in 1917.

Following an operation for appendicitis in 1922, she died at her apartment in St. James's Palace. Shortly before her death, she was awarded the Légion d'honneur in 1922 and was posthumously made the first woman member of the Royal British Society of Sculptors. The Society subsequently created an award in her name.

== Legacy ==
Her youngest sister, Lady Helena, described her in her memoirs:

"She was an irreparable loss to me in every way and her advice in my work had always been the greatest help and encouragement. Her vision was always clear in all matters belonging to others and she seldom made a mistake in giving advice when others came to her in difficulties; she was never offended when her advice was not taken and she had no petty meannesses. She had undying zeal and thoroughness in all she gave her mind to and was the most responsive person that ever existed, equally ready to enjoy anything with you, or, if you were out to fight, always equally ready to oblige. If you wanted an argument she would hurl herself in on the opposite side, without a moment’s hesitation and with the clearest reasons for doing so, made up on the spur of the moment. The most charming of companions, too, as she had the widest possible powers of perception and enjoyment. Her generous praise of others and her ability to make them feel that she appreciated them and their work or thought them worth listening to, drew the best out of people, and even the stupidest felt clever when talking to her. In her own work she was intensely prolific in ideas, her difficulty, she often said, was in eliminating, never in creating."

== Ancestry ==
Ancestors of Lady Feodora Gleichen

16. Christian Albrecht, Prince of Hohenlohe-Langenburg
8. Karl Ludwig, Prince of Hohenlohe-Langenburg
17. Princess Caroline of Stolberg-Gedern
4. Ernst I, Prince of Hohenlohe-Langenburg
18. Johann Christian II, Count of Solms-Baruth
9. Countess Amalie Henriette of Solms-Baruth
19. Countess Friederike Luise Reuss-Köstritz
2. Prince Victor of Hohenlohe-Langenburg
20. Carl Friedrich Wilhelm, 1st Prince of Leiningen
10. Emich Carl, 2nd Prince of Leiningen
21. Countess Christiane of Solms-Rödelheim-Assenheim
5. Princess Feodora of Leiningen
22. Francis, Duke of Saxe-Coburg-Saalfeld
11. Princess Victoria of Saxe-Coburg-Saalfeld
23. Countess Augusta Reuss-Ebersdorf
1. Lady Feodora Gleichen
24. Francis Seymour-Conway, 1st Marquess of Hertford
12. Lord Hugh Seymour
25. Lady Isabella Fitzroy
6. Sir George Seymour
26. James Waldegrave, 2nd Earl Waldegrave
13. Lady Anne Horatio Waldegrave
27. Maria Walpole
3. Laura Wilhelmina Seymour
28. Augustus Berkeley, 4th Earl of Berkeley
14. Sir George Cranfield Berkeley
29. Elizabeth Drax
7. Georgiana Mary Berkeley
30. Lord George Lennox
15. Emilia Charlotte Lennox
31. Lady Louisa Kerr

== Sources ==
- Garrihy, Andrea. "Gleichen, Lady Feodora Georgina Maud (1861–1922)". Oxford Dictionary of National Biography (online ed.). Oxford University Press. doi:10.1093/ref:odnb/33423. (Subscription, Wikipedia Library access or UK public library membership required.)
