= Princess Victor of Hohenlohe-Langenburg =

British-born aristocrat

Laura Williamina Seymour
- Princess Victor of Hohenlohe-Langenburg; Countess von Gleichen
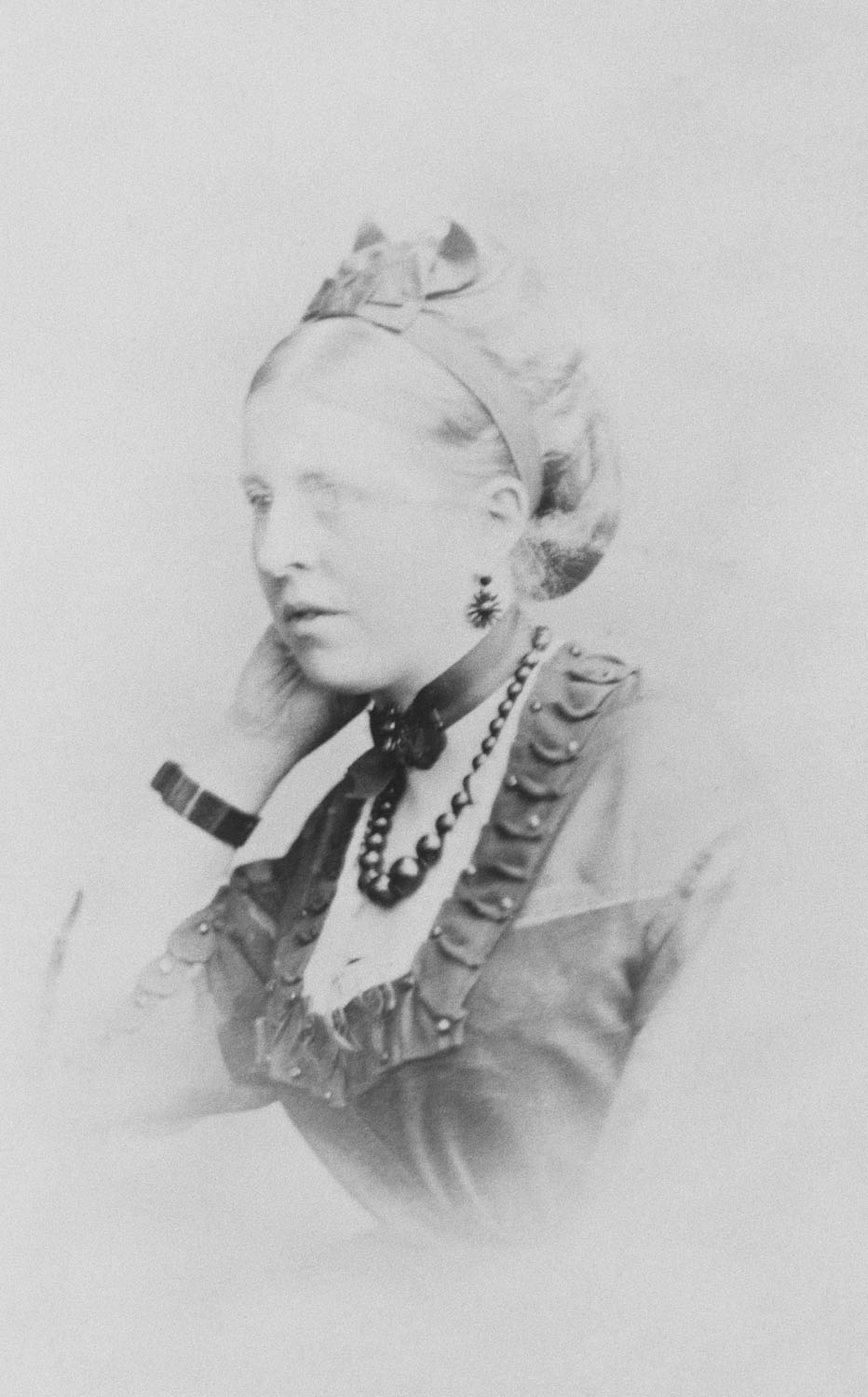
- Half length portrait of Laura, Countess of Gleichen (1873)
- Born: 27 January 1833
- Died: 13 February 1912 (aged 79)
- Spouse: Prince Victor of Hohenlohe-Langenburg (m. 1861; died 1891)
- Issue: Lady Feodora Gleichen; Lord Edward Gleichen; Lady Victoria Gleichen; Lady Helena Gleichen
- House: Seymour
- Father: George Seymour
- Mother: Georgiana Berkeley

Princess Victor of Hohenlohe-Langenburg (Laura Williamina Seymour; 27 January 1833 – 13 February 1912) was a British-born aristocrat whose marriage to a German prince naturalised in England made her a kinswoman of the British royal family and a member of the royal court.

== Early life ==
Laura Williamina Seymour was a daughter of Admiral Sir George Seymour and his wife Georgiana Berkeley, who was a granddaughter of the 4th Earl of Berkeley and a great-granddaughter of the 2nd Duke of Richmond.

== Marriage and issue ==
In 19th-century Europe, noble ancestors in the United Kingdom were not enough for Laura Seymour to contract an equal marriage with a member of a German mediatised family of princely rank. She agreed to a proposal of a morganatic marriage with Prince Victor of Hohenlohe-Langenburg, a half-nephew of Queen Victoria who had served under her father's military command, and this took place on 26 January 1861. But neither she nor any future children were then able to share her husband’s title. Some two weeks before the wedding, Ernst II, Duke of Saxe-Coburg and Gotha, the older brother of Prince Albert, created her Countess of Gleichen to overcome this difficulty. Unusually, her new husband then took her name, becoming Count (von) Gleichen.

When the Countess Gleichen's brother, Francis, inherited his cousin's Marquessate of Hertford in 1870, by Royal Warrant of Precedence Queen Victoria granted Laura Gleichen the rank and style of the daughter of a marquess, entitling her to the prefix Lady before her name. However, she continued to use her comital title until 15 December 1885, when it was gazetted in the Court Circular that the Queen had granted her permission to share, within the British Empire, her husband's princely title. Henceforth she was known as HSH Princess Victor of Hohenlohe-Langenburg, although this changed neither her legal rank nor her title in the German Empire. In accordance with the original Coburg grant, her children were also Count or Countess of Gleichen and, although granted unique precedence before the daughters and younger sons of English dukes in 1913, they never received authorisation to share their parents' princely style at the Court of St. James's, and were known by their comital title (dropping, however, the word von) until George V Anglicised their style in 1917, along with the styles of members of his own family who bore German titles. Princess Victor did not live to undergo that demotion in title.

Laura Seymour and Prince Victor had four children, the daughters becoming notable for their artistic endeavors and cultural patronage:

- Lady Feodora (Feo) Georgina Maud Gleichen (20 December 1861 – 22 February 1922); sculptor
- Lord Albert Edward Wilfred Gleichen (15 January 1863 – 13 December 1937); soldier, married Hon. Sylvia Edwardes on 2 July 1910.
- Lady Victoria (Valda) Alice Leopoldina Ada Laura Gleichen (28 November 1868 – 10 September 1951); singer, married Lt.-Col. Percy Machell on 5 December 1905.
- Lady Helena Emily Gleichen (1 February 1873 – 28 January 1947); artist.

== Personality ==
Lady Helena Gleichen wrote the following about her mother:

My mother had always suffered from shyness and must have gone through agonies marrying into my father’s family. The Empress Eugenie told me how sorry she used to be for her when she saw her at the various big functions that she and my father had to attend. She said how pretty she was, with her lovely fair complexion and golden hair and perfectly oval face. But, according to the Empress, nothing would - make her talk. We none- of us inherited her looks, but all of us, except my eldest sister, inherited her shyness. Many people were very sorry for her, too, having such unconventional children, and rudely, if aptly, compared her to a hen with ducklings when we all broke out into our different professions.

== Ancestry ==
Paternally, Laura Seymour descended in an unbroken male line from the Seymours (originally, St. Maur) who belonged to the gentry of the 12th century, acquired considerable landed wealth by the marriage of Sir Roger de St. Maur to the baronial co-heiress Cecily Berkeley, and were raised to peerage in 1536 as Viscounts Beauchamp. Laura's direct ancestor, Edward Seymour, 1st Duke of Somerset, was the eldest brother of Henry VIII's queen consort, Jane Seymour, and had himself declared Lord Protector of England during the minority of their son, King Edward VI. The Dukedom of Somerset and the Marquessate of Hertford, eventually devolved upon her branch of the Seymour family. Laura Seymour descended three times from Charles II of England and once from James II of England (although severed from the Royal Family by bars sinister). Furthermore, she descended from Elector Palatine Charles I Louis, and from Maurice, Prince of Orange also by mistresses.

Ancestors of Princess Victor of Hohenlohe-Langenburg

16. Francis Seymour-Conway, 1st Baron Conway
8. Francis Seymour-Conway, 1st Marquess of Hertford
17. Charlotte Shorter of Bybrook
4. Vice-Admiral Lord Hugh Seymour MP
18. Charles FitzRoy, 2nd Duke of Grafton
9. Lady Isabella Fitzroy
19. Lady Henrietta Somerset
2. Admiral Sir George Seymour
20. James Waldegrave, 1st Earl Waldegrave
10. James Waldegrave, 2nd Earl Waldegrave
21. Mary Webb
5. Lady Anne Horatio Waldegrave
22. The Hon. Sir Edward Walpole MP
11. Maria Walpole
23. Dorothy Clement
1. Lady Laura Williamina Seymour
24. James Berkeley, 3rd Earl of Berkeley
12. Augustus Berkeley, 4th Earl of Berkeley
25. Lady Louisa Lennox
6. Admiral The Hon. Sir George Cranfield Berkeley MP
26. Henry Drax MP
13. Elizabeth Drax
27. Elizabeth Ernle
3. Georgiana Mary Berkeley
28. Charles Lennox, 2nd Duke of Richmond
14. General Lord George Lennox MP
29. Lady Sarah Cadogan
7. Lady Emilia Charlotte Lennox
30. William Kerr, 4th Marquess of Lothian
15. Lady Louisa Kerr
31. Lady Caroline Darcy
