= Court Circular =

Record of engagements by British royals

The Court Circular is the official record that lists the engagements carried out by the monarch of the United Kingdom and the other Commonwealth realms; the royal family; and appointments to their staff and to the court. It is issued by St James's Palace and printed a day in arrears at the back of The Times, The Daily Telegraph and The Scotsman newspapers. An archive of the circular since 1997 is provided on the British monarchy's website.

== History ==
The Court Circular was established in 1803 by King George III, who had become frustrated at inaccurate reporting of royal events by the national press. He arranged for a daily report to be circulated to the press, listing the sovereign's official engagements.

Until the 1960s, the Circular as printed in The Times and elsewhere would record the movements of members of the upper levels of society even if they were not part of the royal family and were not acting on its behalf.

== Style and structure ==
The circular is traditionally written in formal language, and describes persons with their official styles and titles at all times (Michael Ancram, for instance, was referred to as "the Marquess of Lothian MP" from 2004 to 2010). There has, however, been some modernisation of the writing style in recent years.

The Court Circular follows royal protocols strictly. Announcements in the circular are listed by the official residences of those being reported on, in order of precedence. Only engagements which are carried out by the king (or in the UK on the king's behalf) are listed. Certain engagements carried out in the UK by persons not of the king's family but on his behalf are also listed.

== Present day ==
Today, the following members of the Royal Family are listed in the Court Circular:

Name	Residences	Styled
King Charles III	Buckingham Palace; Windsor Castle; Sandringham House; Balmoral Castle; Holyrood Palace; Various Government Houses	The King, then His Majesty
Queen Camilla	Buckingham Palace; Windsor Castle; Sandringham House; Balmoral Castle; Holyrood Palace; Various Government Houses	The Queen, then Her Majesty
William, Prince of Wales	Kensington Palace until July 2013: St James's Palace until July 2009: Clarence House	The Prince of Wales (in Scotland: The Duke of Rothesay), then His Royal Highness
Catherine, Princess of Wales	Kensington Palace until July 2013: St James's Palace	The Princess of Wales (in Scotland: The Duchess of Rothesay), then Her Royal Highness
Anne, Princess Royal	St James's Palace until February 2019: Buckingham Palace	The Princess Royal, then Her Royal Highness
Prince Edward, Duke of Edinburgh	St James's Palace until March 2019: Buckingham Palace	The Duke of Edinburgh, then His Royal Highness
Sophie, Duchess of Edinburgh	St James's Palace until March 2019: Buckingham Palace	The Duchess of Edinburgh, then Her Royal Highness
Prince Richard, Duke of Gloucester	Kensington Palace	The Duke of Gloucester, then His Royal Highness
Birgitte, Duchess of Gloucester	Kensington Palace	The Duchess of Gloucester, then Her Royal Highness
Prince Edward, Duke of Kent	St James's Palace	The Duke of Kent, then His Royal Highness
Princess Alexandra, The Honourable Lady Ogilvy	St James's Palace until April 2019: Buckingham Palace until April 2015: Thatched House Lodge, Richmond	Princess Alexandra, then Her Royal Highness

Although the Princess Royal and the Duke and Duchess of Edinburgh do not reside permanently at Buckingham Palace, their offices are based there, and they have use of apartments at the palace as a London residence.

Prince William began carrying out royal duties in July 2005, and was listed for the first time in his own right on 2 July for representing the Queen at a war memorial service in New Zealand.

Since they stepped back as senior members of the Royal Family and emigrated to the United States of America, the Duke and Duchess of Sussex do not carry out official royal engagements and do not appear in the Court Circular, unless attending an important royal function with other members of the Royal Family.

Andrew Mountbatten-Windsor also does not carry out official royal engagements and therefore does not appear in the Court Circular (unless attending an important royal function with other members of the Royal Family) after he stepped down from public duties in November 2019 following intense negative reaction to a BBC television interview he gave regarding allegations of sexual abuse, which he denies.

Princess Beatrice and Princess Eugenie do not carry out official royal engagements and do not appear on the Court Circular, except when attending an important royal function with other members of the Royal Family.

Vice Admiral Sir Timothy Laurence is occasionally listed as accompanying his wife, the Princess Royal, on visits overseas and within the United Kingdom. He was styled as Vice Admiral Timothy Laurence until 2011; now he is styled as Vice Admiral Sir Tim Laurence, with Vice-Admiral occasionally hyphenated.

Prince and Princess Michael of Kent only appear in the Court Circular when attending an important royal function as they do not carry out official royal engagements on behalf of the King.

=== Joint engagements ===
When Royals undertake joint engagements, it is listed under the section of the person with the higher precedence. They are referred to as "X and Y" (in order of precedence), then "Their Majesties", "Their Royal Highnesses" or "His/Her Majesty and His/Her Royal Highness".

== Commonwealth realms ==
When the king is visiting one of the Commonwealth realms, the relevant Government House or hotel where he is staying is listed in the Court Circular as his residence. This differs from state visits to foreign countries where either the official residence of the foreign head of state, or whichever hotel the king is staying at, or simply Buckingham Palace is listed.

When other members of the royal family visit one of the realms, their UK principal residence is listed.

There is no separate Court Circular for any of the Commonwealth realms other than the UK. The Court Circular only lists engagements carried out by the king, and not engagements carried out by others acting on his behalf outside the UK, for example by vice-regal officers such as governors or governors-general.

== Events commonly listed in the Court Circular ==
- Investitures by the King, the Prince of Wales or the Princess Royal
- Privy council meetings attended by the King or a Counsellor of State
- Meetings (described as Audiences) typically between the King and either: the Prime Minister of the United Kingdom, the Chancellor of the Exchequer, the Lord President of the Council or the First Minister of Scotland
- Royal engagements in the UK or abroad including the attendance of His Majesty's Lord-Lieutenants or their deputies, the Personal Representatives of the King throughout the Isles and overseas
- Departures of members of the Royal Family from the UK to attend events abroad
- Engagements of the Chief of the Diplomatic Corps on behalf of the King (usually the bidding of farewell to departing Ambassadors or High Commissioners)
- Attendance of representatives of the Royal Family at memorial services

== See also ==
- The London Gazette
- Social and Personal
