= Killing Me Softly =

Killing Me Softly may refer to:

- "Killing Me Softly with His Song", a 1972 song by Lori Lieberman, also covered by Roberta Flack in 1973, and Fugees in 1996 as "Killing Me Softly"
- Killing Me Softly (Roberta Flack album), 1973
- Killing Me Softly (Ferrante & Teicher album), 1973
- Killing Me Softly (film), a 2002 erotic thriller starring Heather Graham and Joseph Fiennes
- Killing Me Softly (novel), a 1999 psychological thriller novel by Nicci French, that the film is based upon
- Killing Me Softly (band), an English metalcore band formed in 2023

== See also ==
- Killing Me Softly with Her Song (album), a 1973 album by Johnny Mathis
- "Killing Me Softly with His Height", an episode of Hannah Montana
- Killing 'em Softly, a 1982 Canadian film
- Killing Them Softly, a 2012 American film
- Dave Chappelle: Killin' Them Softly, a 2000 comedy stand-up film
