= River Fleet =

Subterranean river in London, England

Coordinates: 51°30′39″N 0°6′16″W

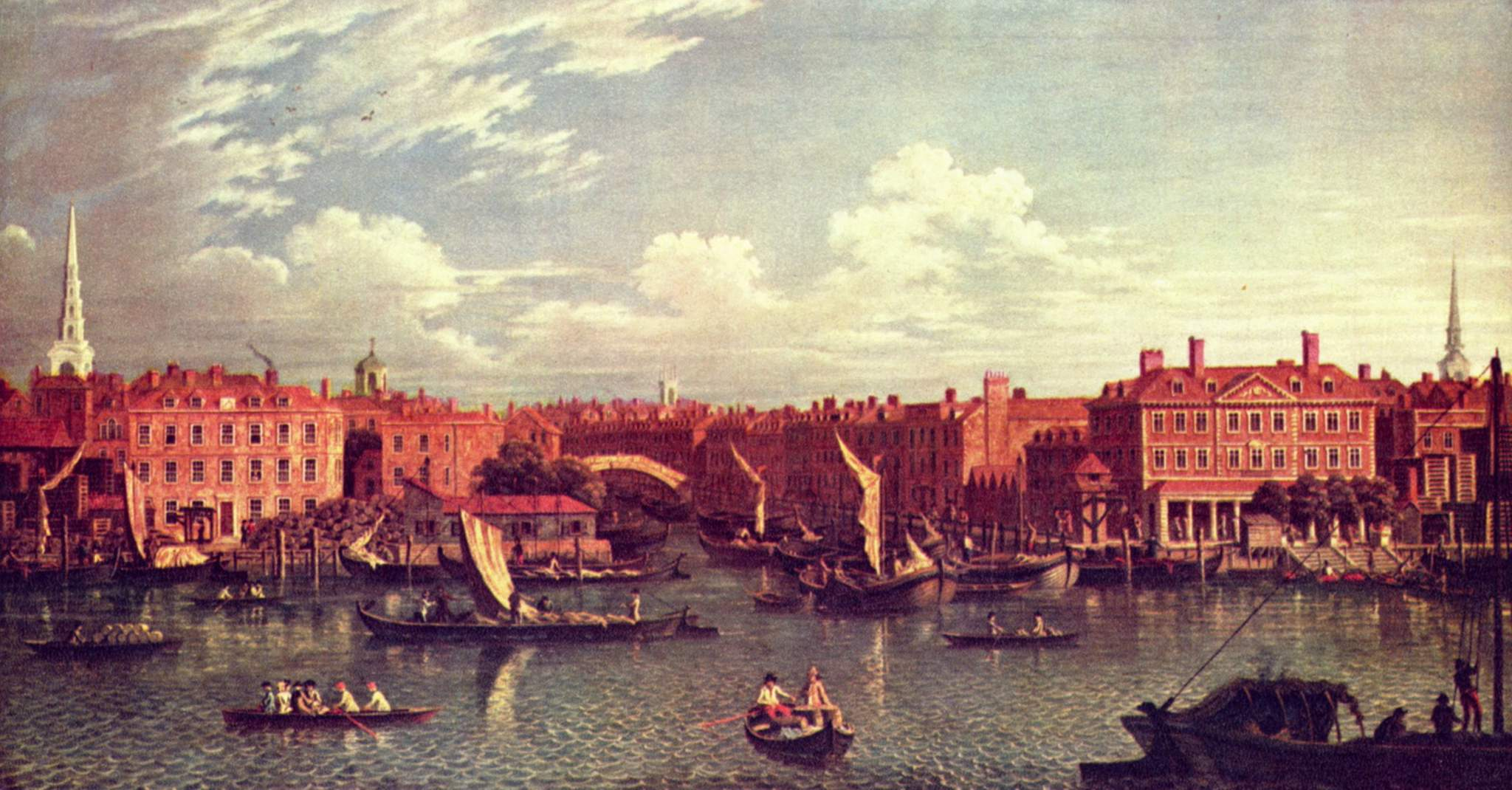
Entrance to the River Fleet as it emerges into the Thames, by Samuel Scott, c. 1750

The River Fleet is the largest of London's subterranean rivers, all of which today contain foul water for treatment. It has been used as a culverted sewer since the development of Joseph Bazalgette's London sewer system in the mid-19th century with the water being treated at Beckton Sewage Treatment Works. Its headwaters are two streams on Hampstead Heath, each of which was dammed into a series of ponds—the Hampstead Ponds and the Highgate Ponds—in the 18th century. At the southern edge of Hampstead Heath these descend underground as sewers and join in Camden Town. The waters flow 4 miles (6 km) from the ponds.

The river gives its name to Fleet Street, the eastern end of which is at what was the crossing over the river known as Fleet Bridge, and is now the site of Ludgate Circus.

== Name ==
The river's name is derived from the Anglo-Saxon flēot "tidal inlet". In Anglo-Saxon times, the Fleet served as a dock for shipping.

The lower reaches of the river were known as the Holbourne (or Oldbourne), from which Holborn derived its name.

The river gives its name to Fleet Street which runs from Ludgate Circus to Temple Bar at the Strand. In the 1970s, a London Underground tube line was planned to lie under the line of Fleet Street, provisionally named the Fleet line. However, it was renamed the Jubilee line in 1977, and plans for the part of the route through the City of London were subsequently abandoned.

== Course and tributaries ==
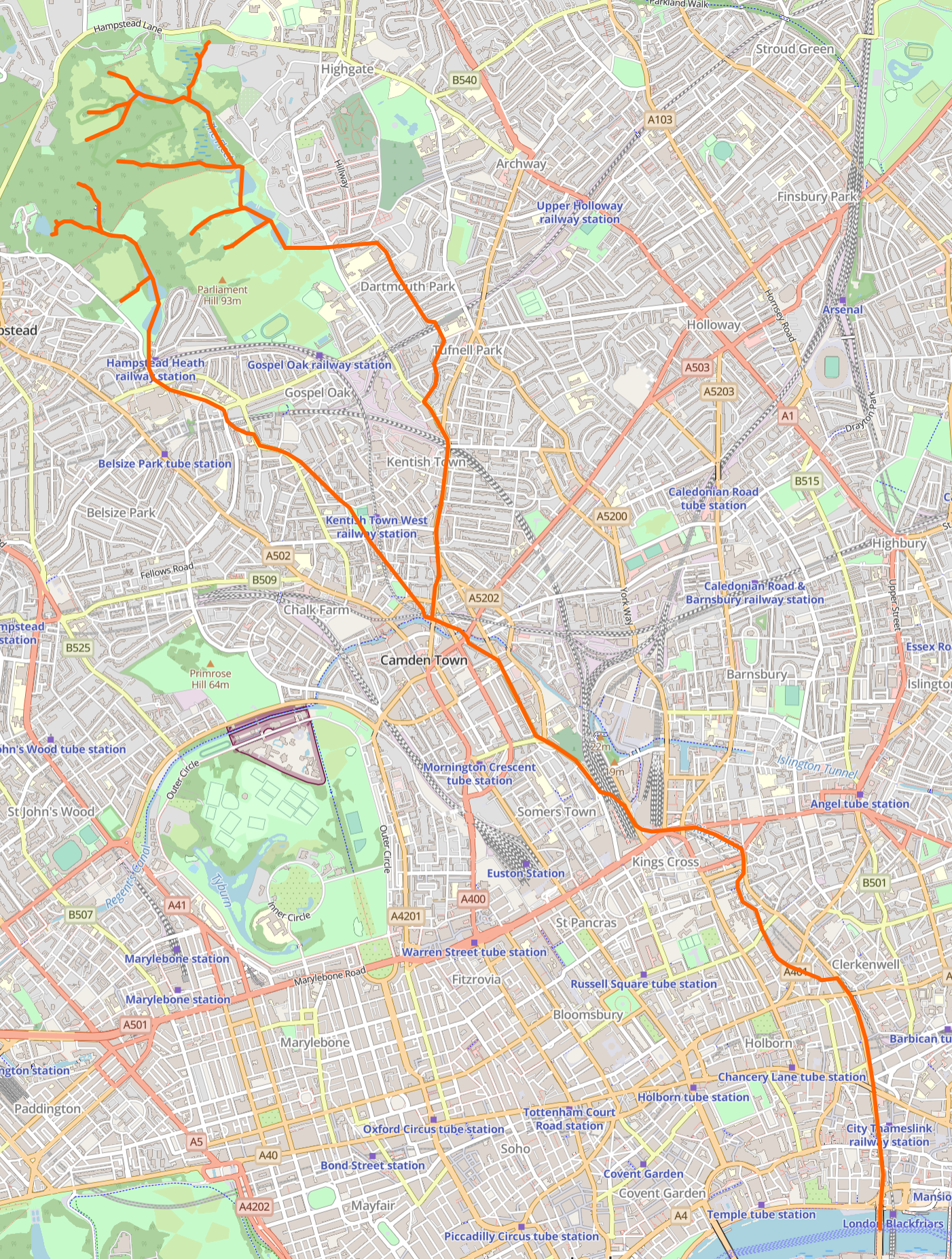
The course of the River Fleet

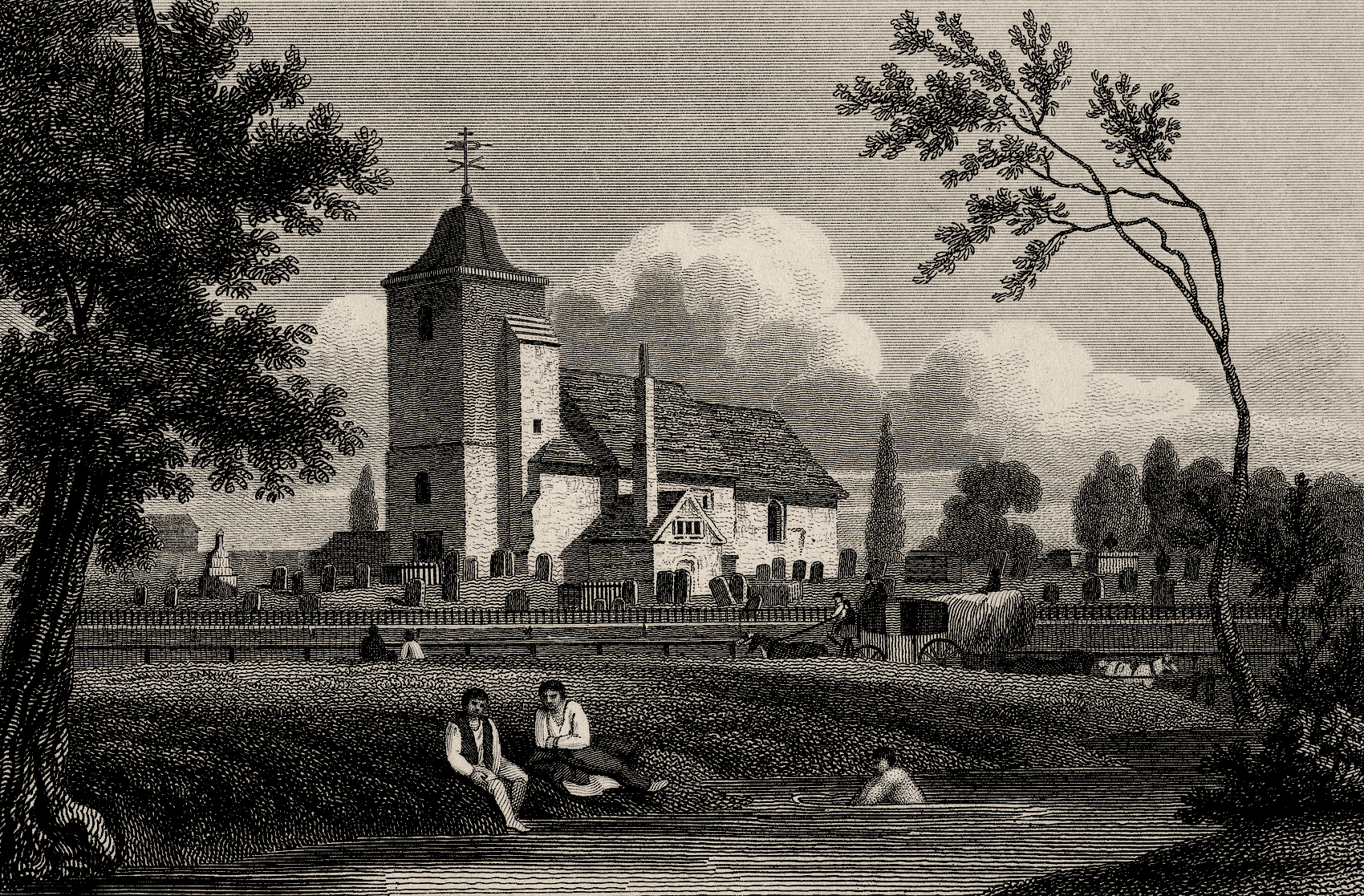
The Fleet passing by St Pancras Old Church

The Fleet rises on Hampstead Heath and flows on the surface as the Hampstead Ponds and the Highgate Ponds. They then go underground, pass under Kentish Town, join in Camden Town, and flow onwards towards St Pancras Old Church, which was sited on the river's banks. From there the river passed in a sinuous course which is responsible for the unusual building line adjacent to King's Cross station; the German Gymnasium faced the river banks, and the curve of the Great Northern Hotel follows that of the Fleet, which passes alongside it. King's Cross was originally named Battle Bridge, a corruption of Broad Ford Bridge referring to an older crossing of the Fleet. In turn John Nelson in his The History, Topography, and Antiquities of the Parish of St. Mary Islington of 1811 linked a supposed Roman army camp found under some nearby brick fields with the site of Boudica's final battle, based only on his comparison of the local topography with the scant description of the battlefield supplied by the near-contemporary historian Tacitus. The name was changed in the 19th century to refer to an unpopular statue of George IV erected in 1830 but, although it was replaced after only fifteen years, the name remains.

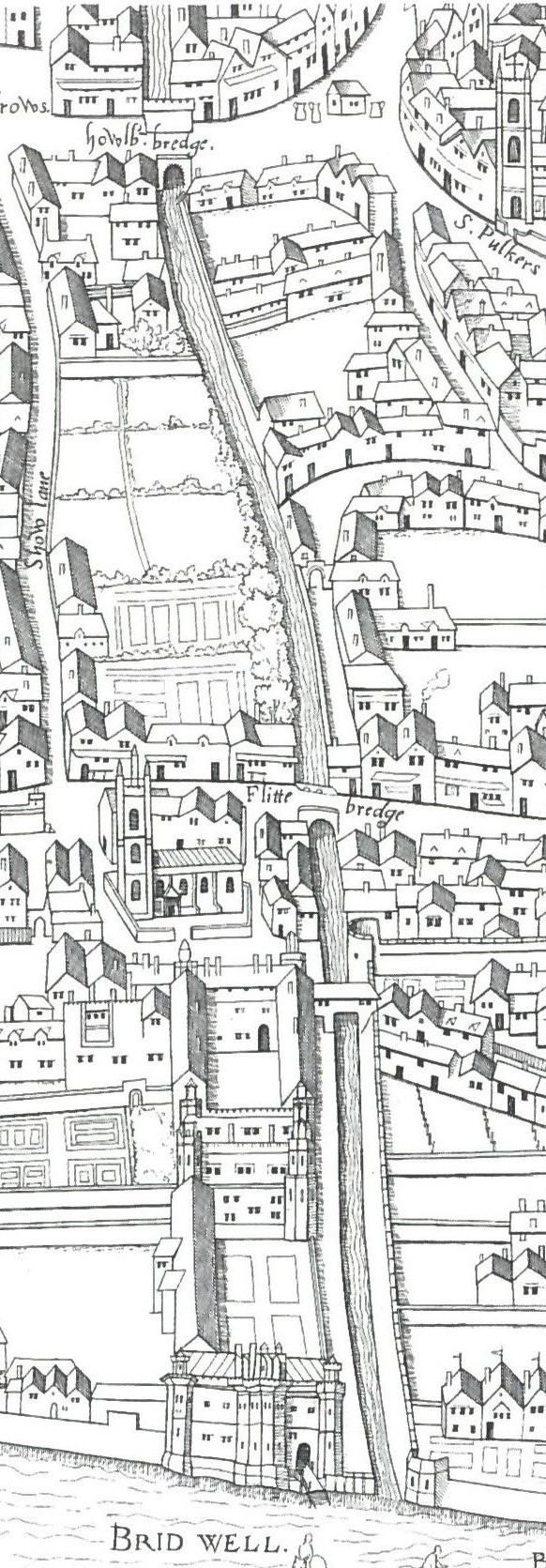
The southern reaches of the Fleet, flowing beneath Holborn Bridge and Fleet Bridge, past Bridewell Palace, and into the Thames, as shown on the "Copperplate" map of London, surveyed between 1553 and 1559

From there, it heads down King's Cross Road and other streets, including Farringdon Road and Farringdon Street. The line of the former river marks the western boundary of Clerkenwell, the eastern boundary of Holborn and a small part of the eastern boundary of St Pancras. In this way it continues to form part of the boundary of the modern London Boroughs of Camden and Islington.

At Farringdon Street the valley broadens out and straightens to join the Thames beneath Blackfriars Bridge. In the lower reaches, the valley slopes in the surrounding streets which explains the presence of three viaduct bridges (at Holborn Viaduct across Farringdon Street, another over Shoe Lane, and another on Rosebery Avenue where it crosses Warner Street).

=== Lamb's Conduit ===
A small tributary flowed west to east to join the Fleet near Mount Pleasant. This was later utilised to feed Lamb's Conduit. The line of the original brook formed Holborn's boundary with St Pancras to the north. The sweeping curve of Roger Street is part of that boundary line.

=== Fagswell Brook ===
The Fagswell Brook (also spelled Faggeswell) was a tributary that joined the Fleet from the east and partially formed the northern boundary of the City of London. The brook flowed east to west on a line approximating to Charterhouse Street and Charterhouse Square. In 1603, the historian John Stow described its demise:

Fagges Well, neare unto Smithfield by the Charterhouse, now lately dammed up.

A part of the course close to Charterhouse Square was excavated as part of the Crossrail project.

=== Today ===
The Fleet, which is now a sewer that follows its route, can be seen and heard through a grating in Ray Street, Clerkenwell in front of The Coach pub (formerly the Coach and Horses), just off Farringdon Road. The position of the river can still be seen in the surrounding streetscape with Ray Street and its continuation to Greville Street and Saffron Street. The Fleet can also be heard through a grid in the centre of Charterhouse Street, where it joins Farringdon Road (on the Smithfield side of the junction).

In wet weather (when the sewer system is overloaded), and on a very low tide, the murky Fleet could be seen gushing into the Thames from the Thameswalk exit of Blackfriars station, immediately under Blackfriars Bridge. After the construction of the Thames Tideway Tunnel, the original Fleet Main combined sewer overflow (CSO) outfall was intercepted under Bazalgette Embankment into the Tideway Tunnel. The new Fleet Main CSO outfall, located away from the Blackfriars Bridge, closer to the tunnel shaft, can still discharge into the Thames in the event of sewer overflow.

It is still possible today to trace the path from head to mouth of the Fleet.

River Fleet - head to mouth

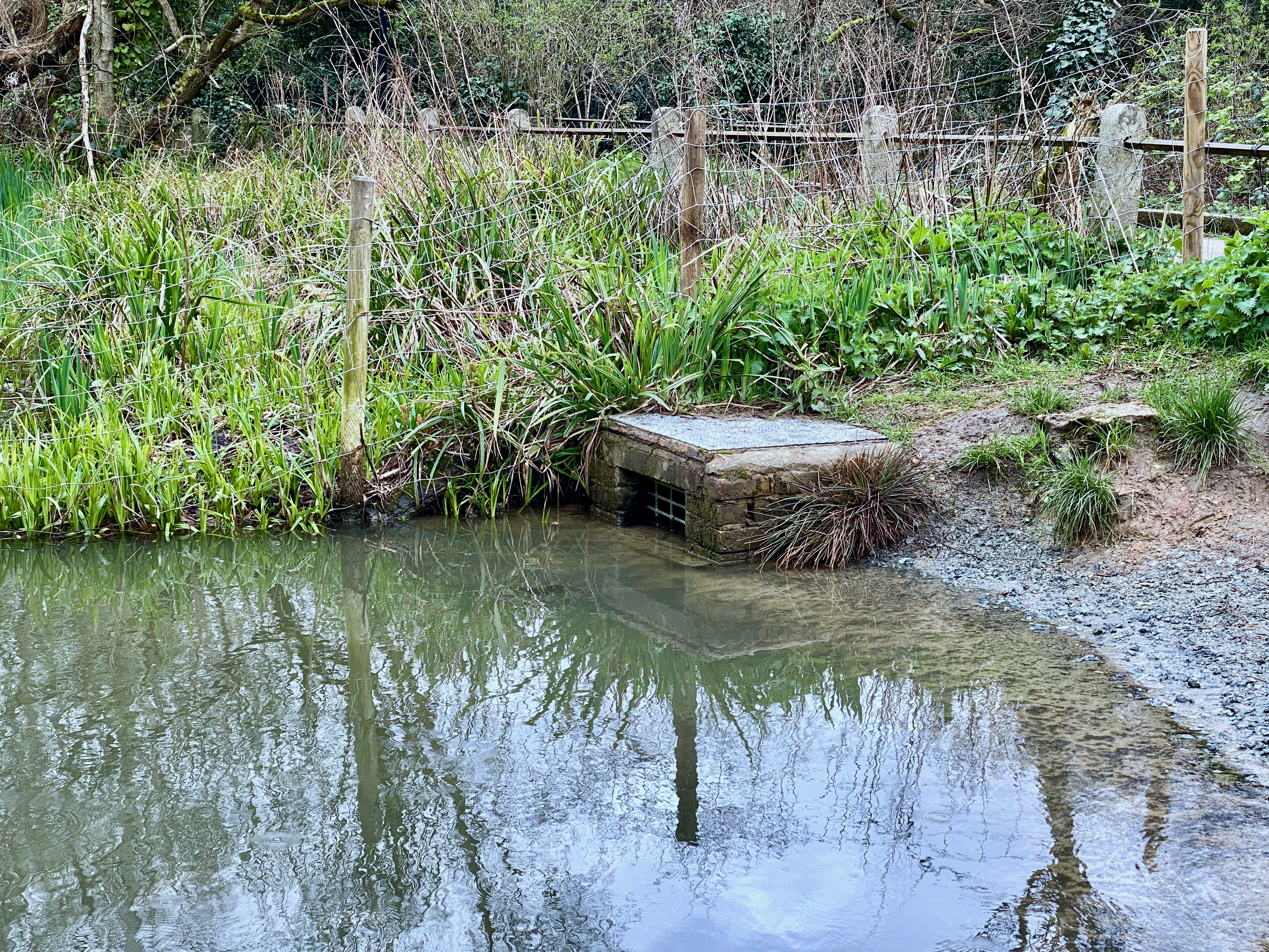
Headwaters at Vale of Health Pond drain to the Hampstead Stream

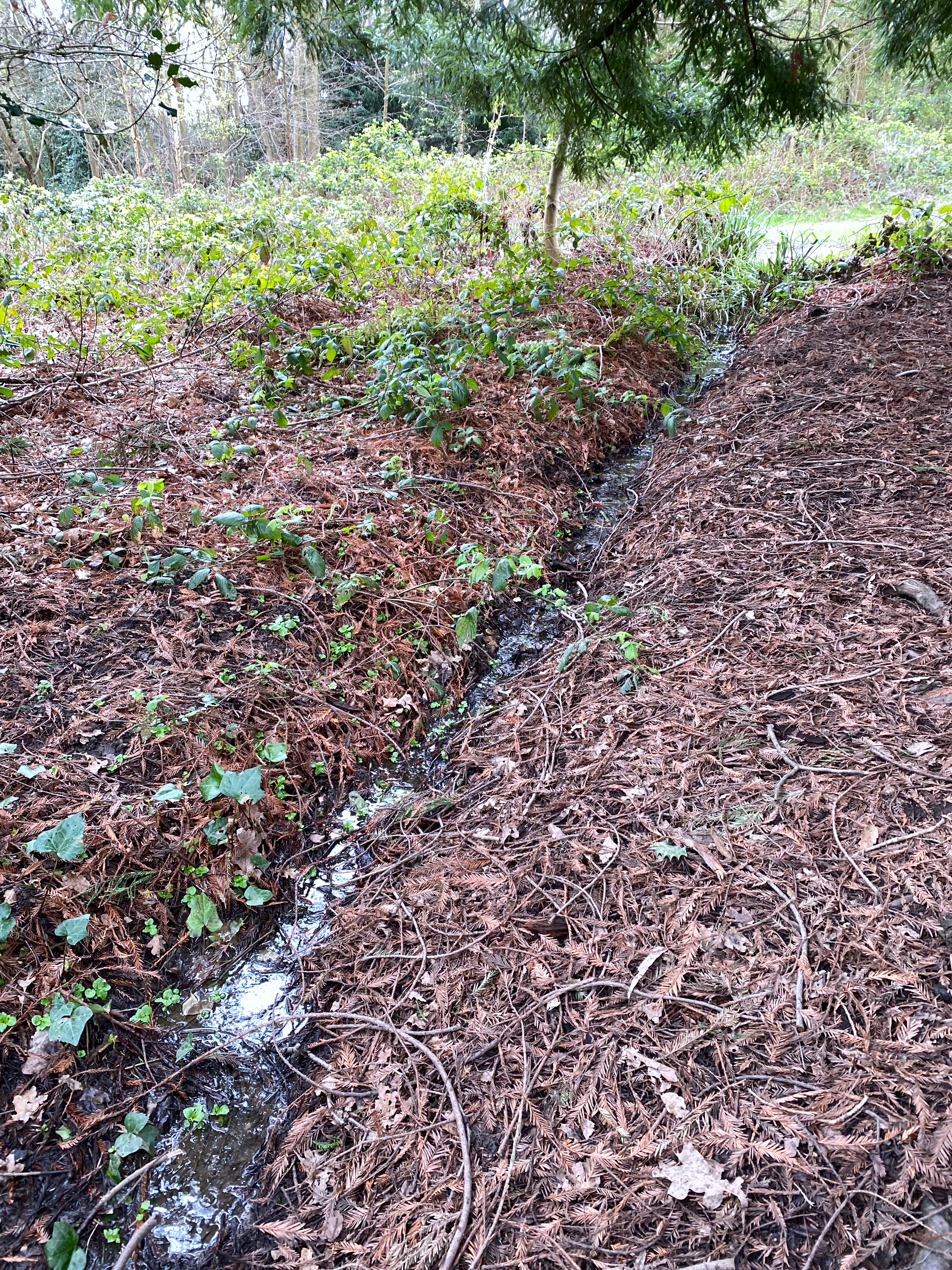
The Hampstead Stream

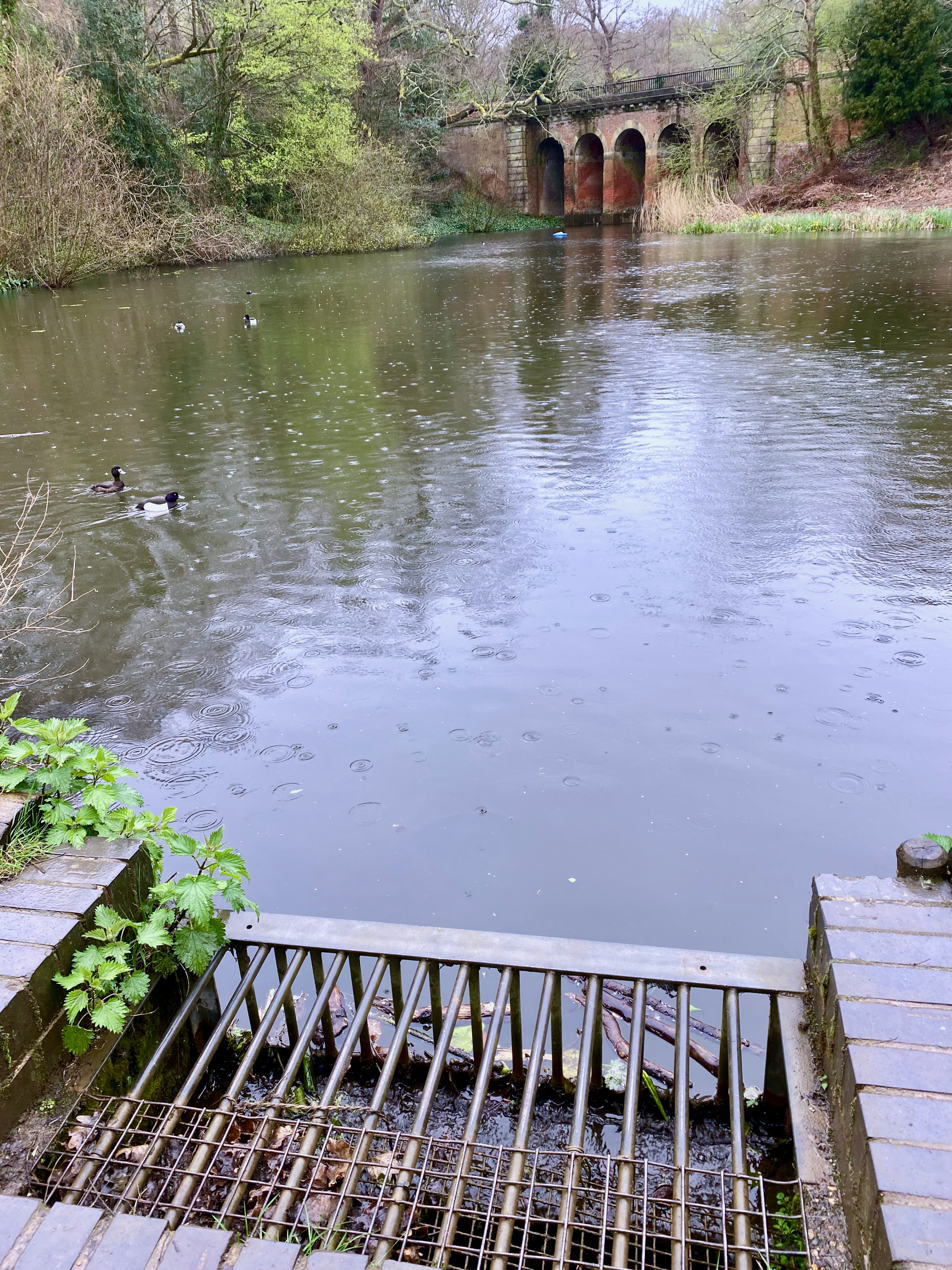
Viaduct Pond drains to downstream ponds

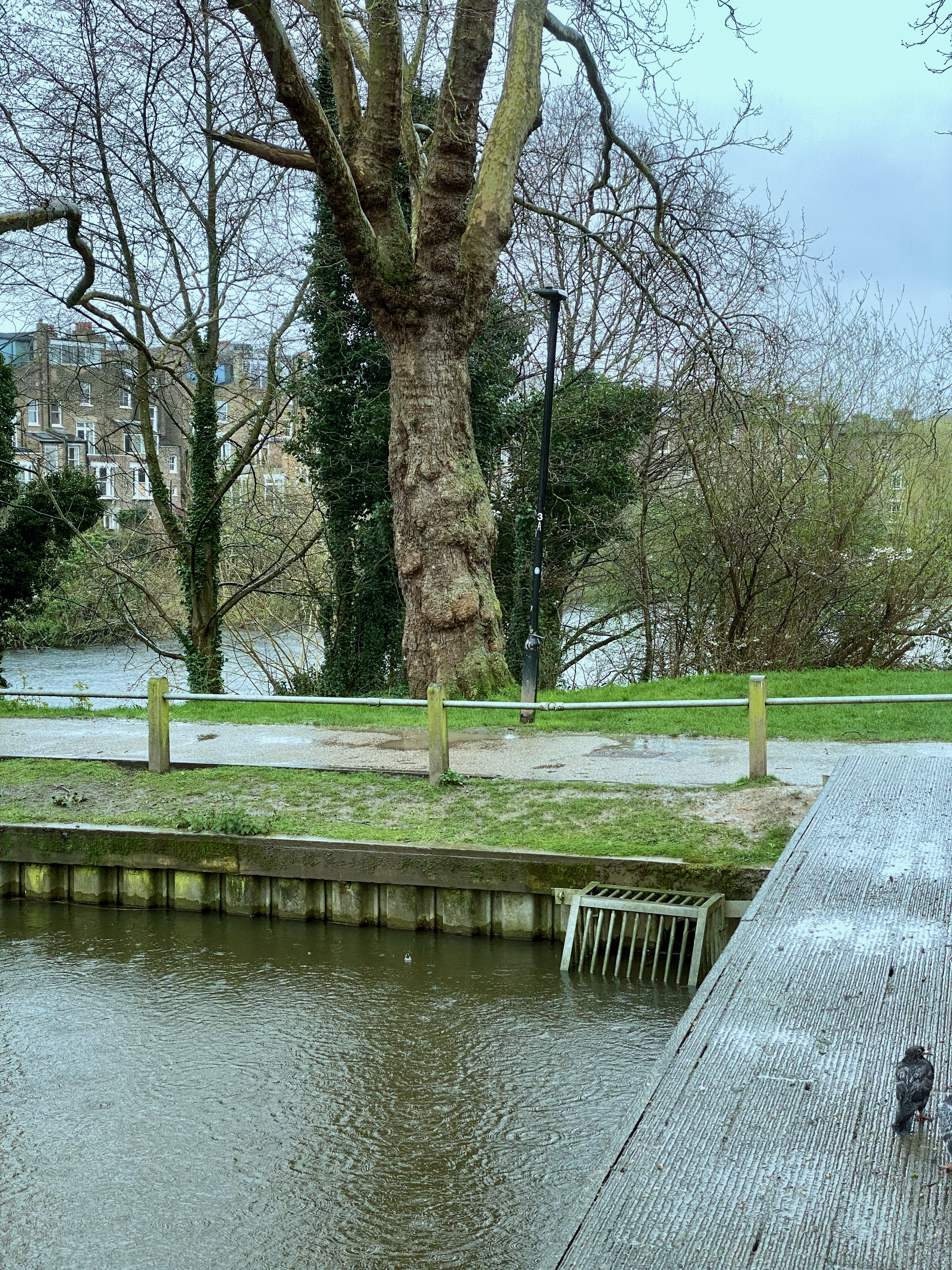
No2 Pond drains to Hampstead Brook sewer

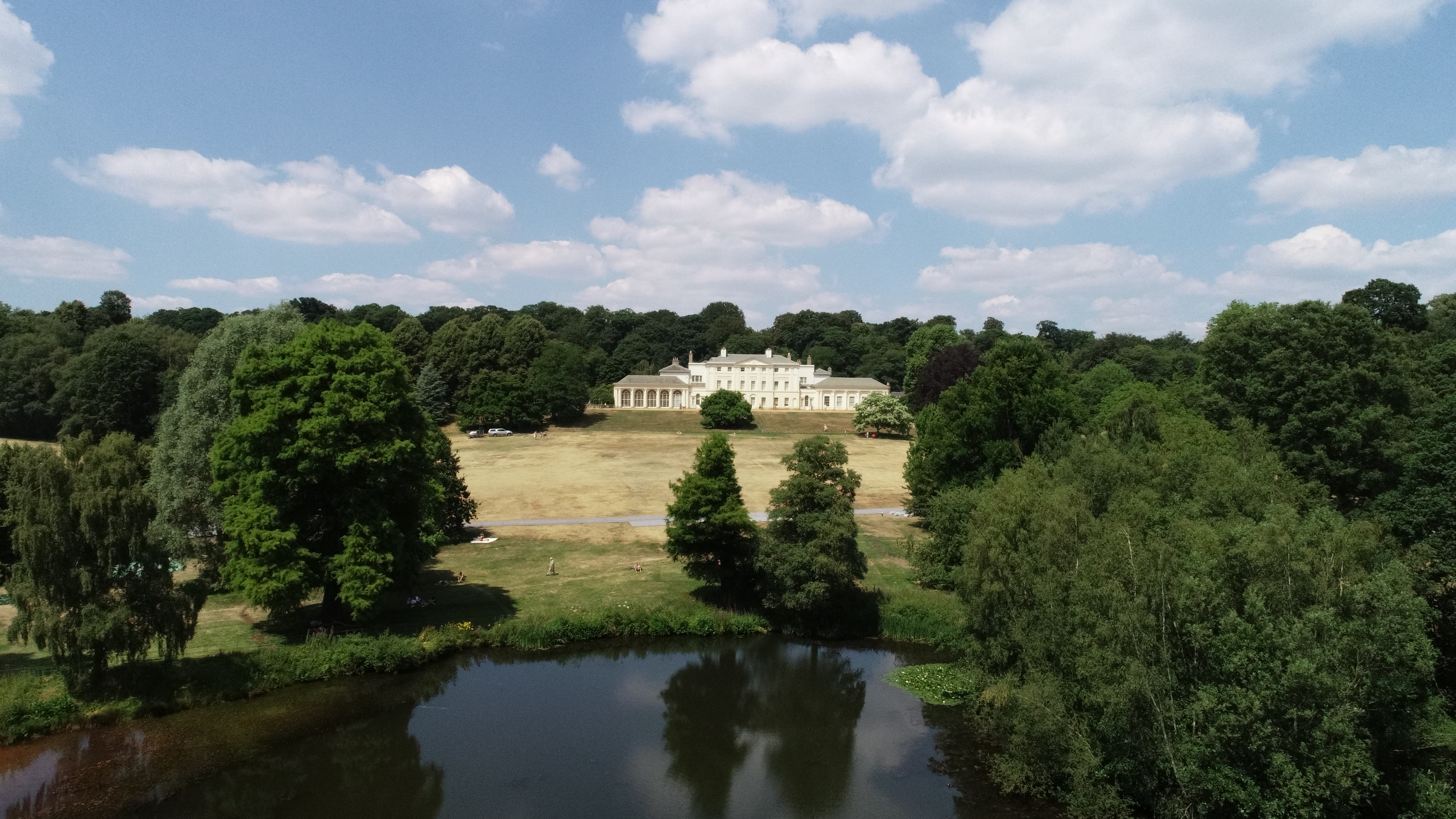
Eastern headwaters start at the trees at the south-west corner of the Kenwood House

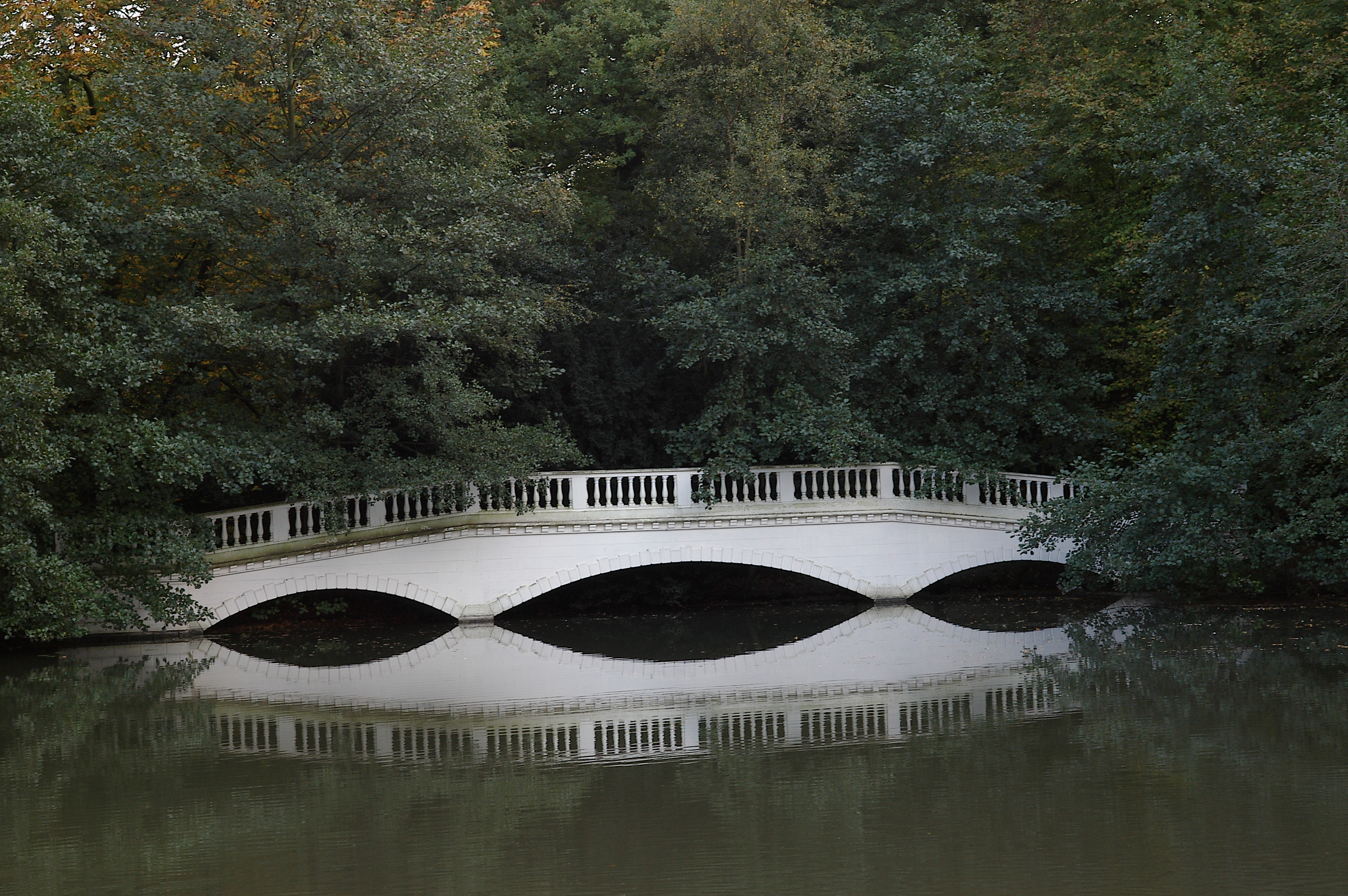
The Highgate Brook flows to Concert Pond

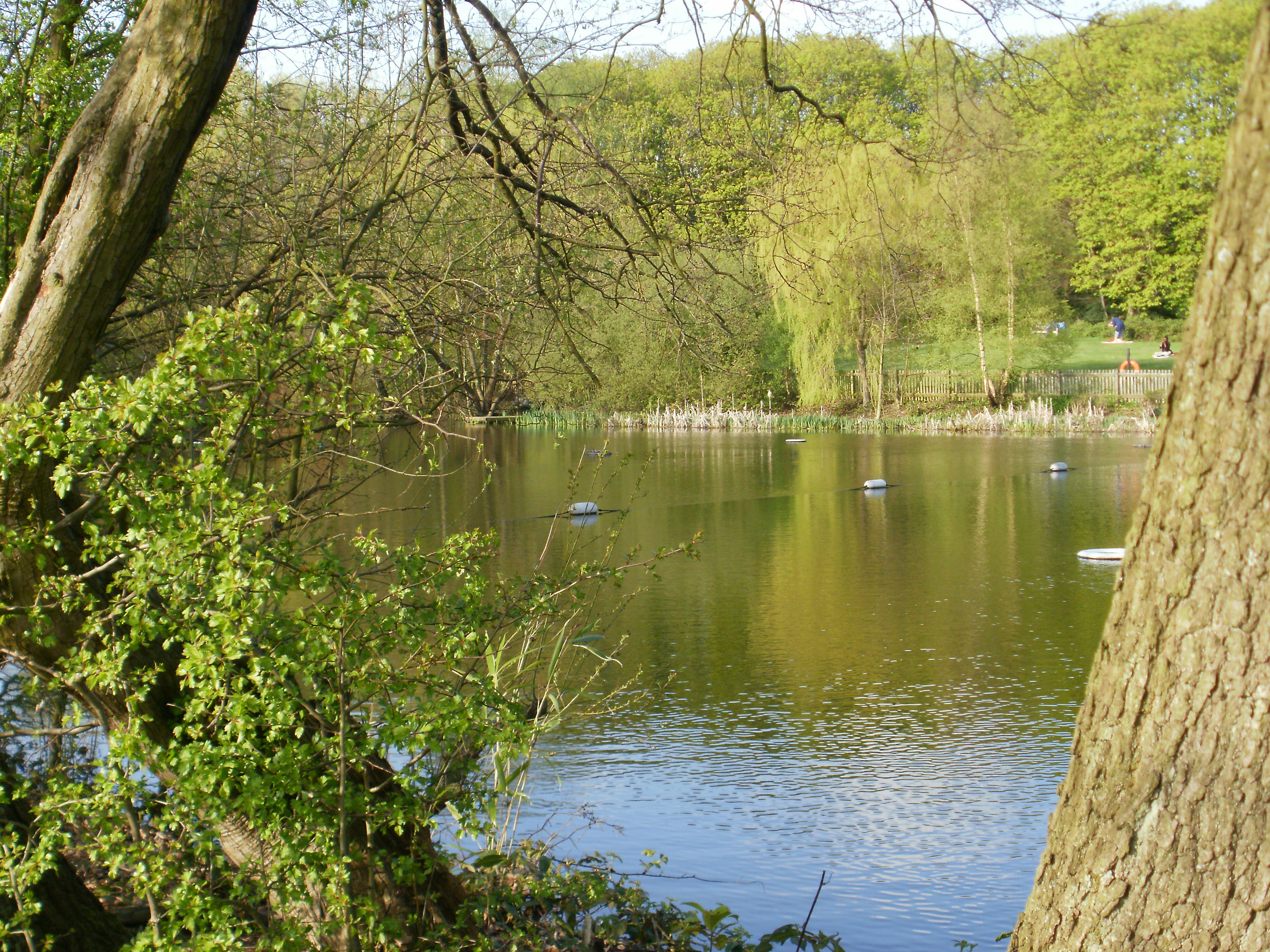
The Highgate Brook flows through a series of ponds (Ladies Bathing Pond pictured), down to No1 Pond.

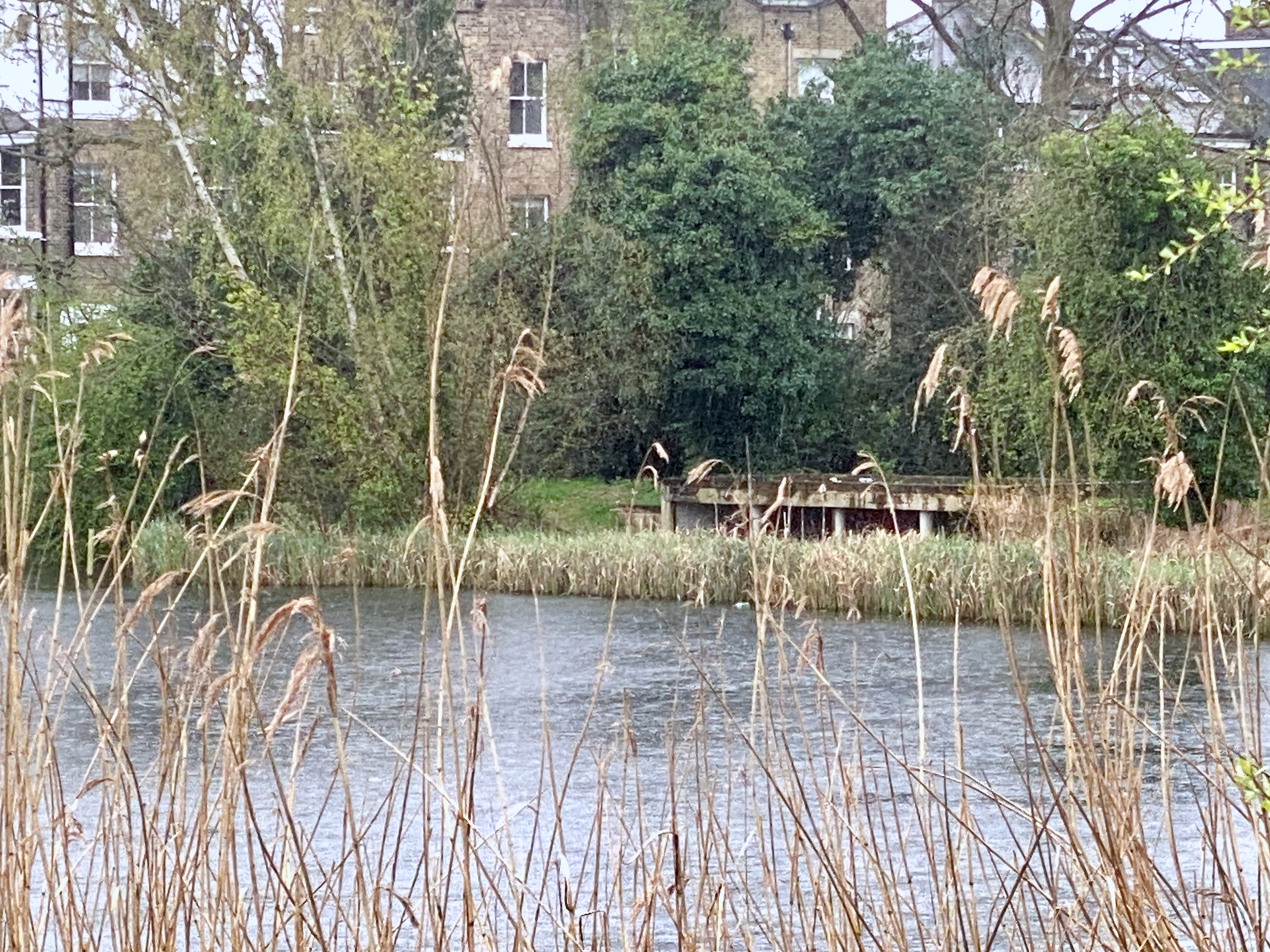
No1 Pond drains to Highgate Brook sewer

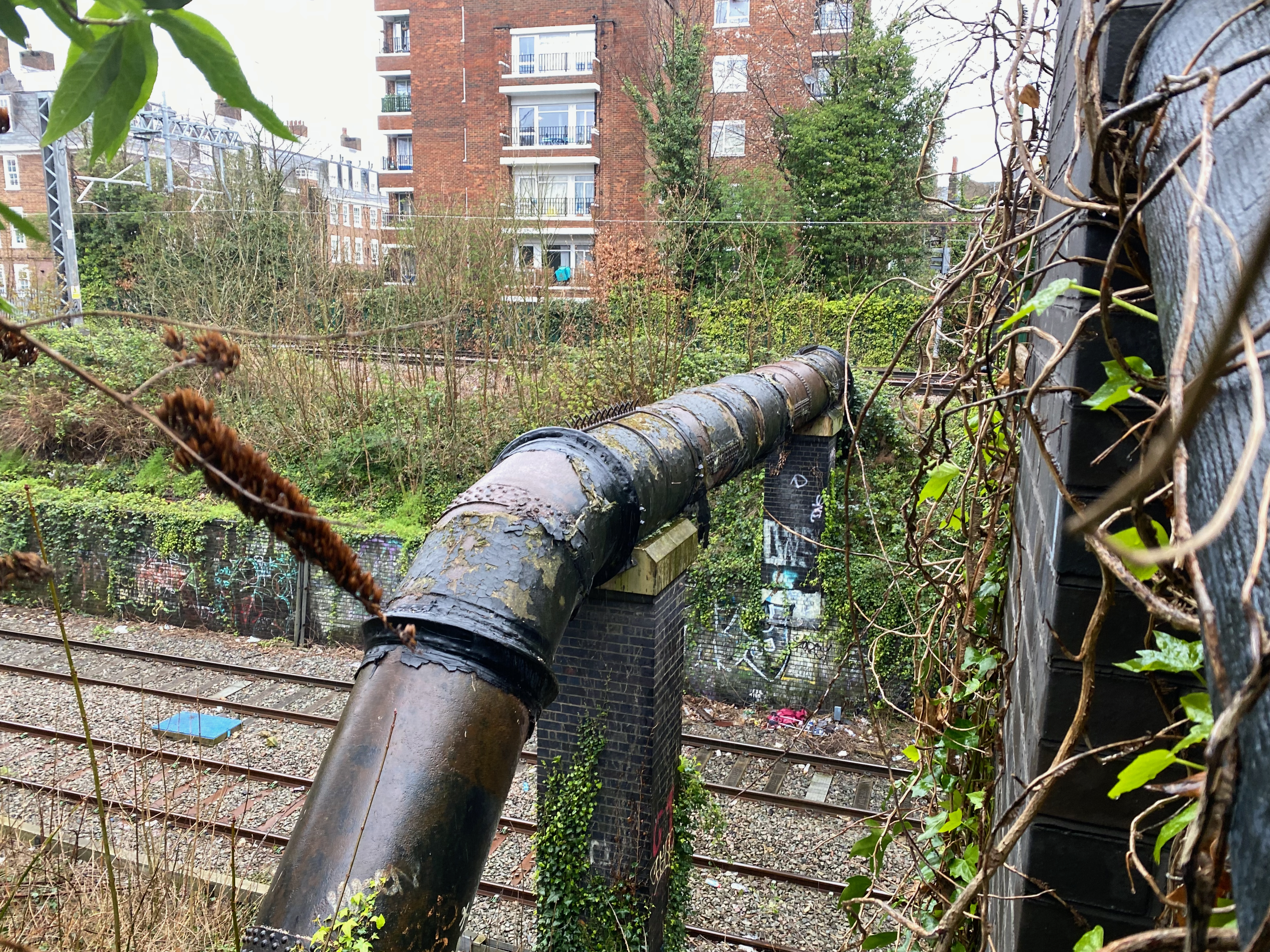
Highgate Brook sewer near Churchill Road footbridge

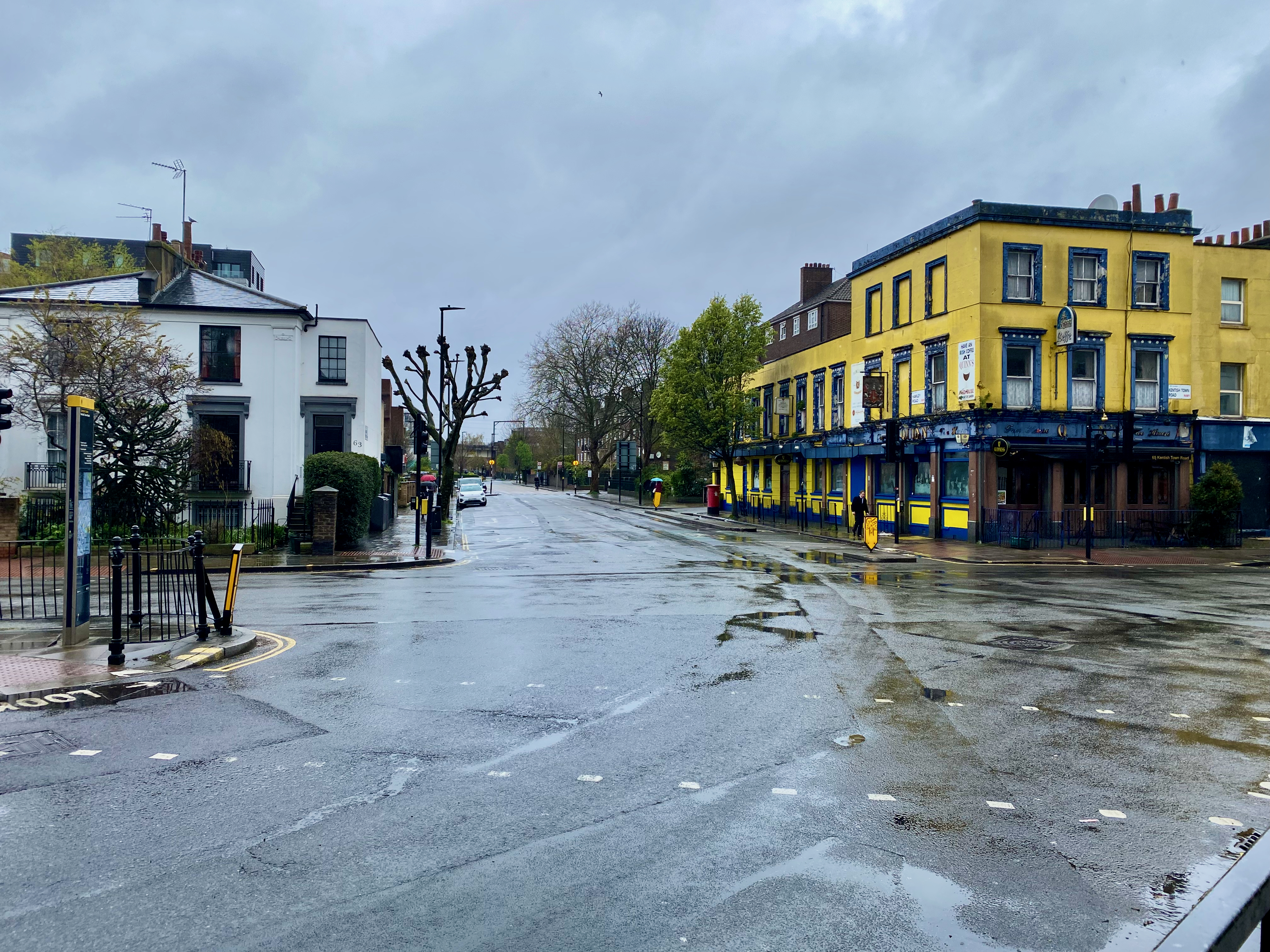
Hampstead and Highgate Brooks meet at Hawley Street and Kentish Town Road

The Fleet at Lyme Street

The Fleet at Ray Street

The Fleet at Saffron Hill

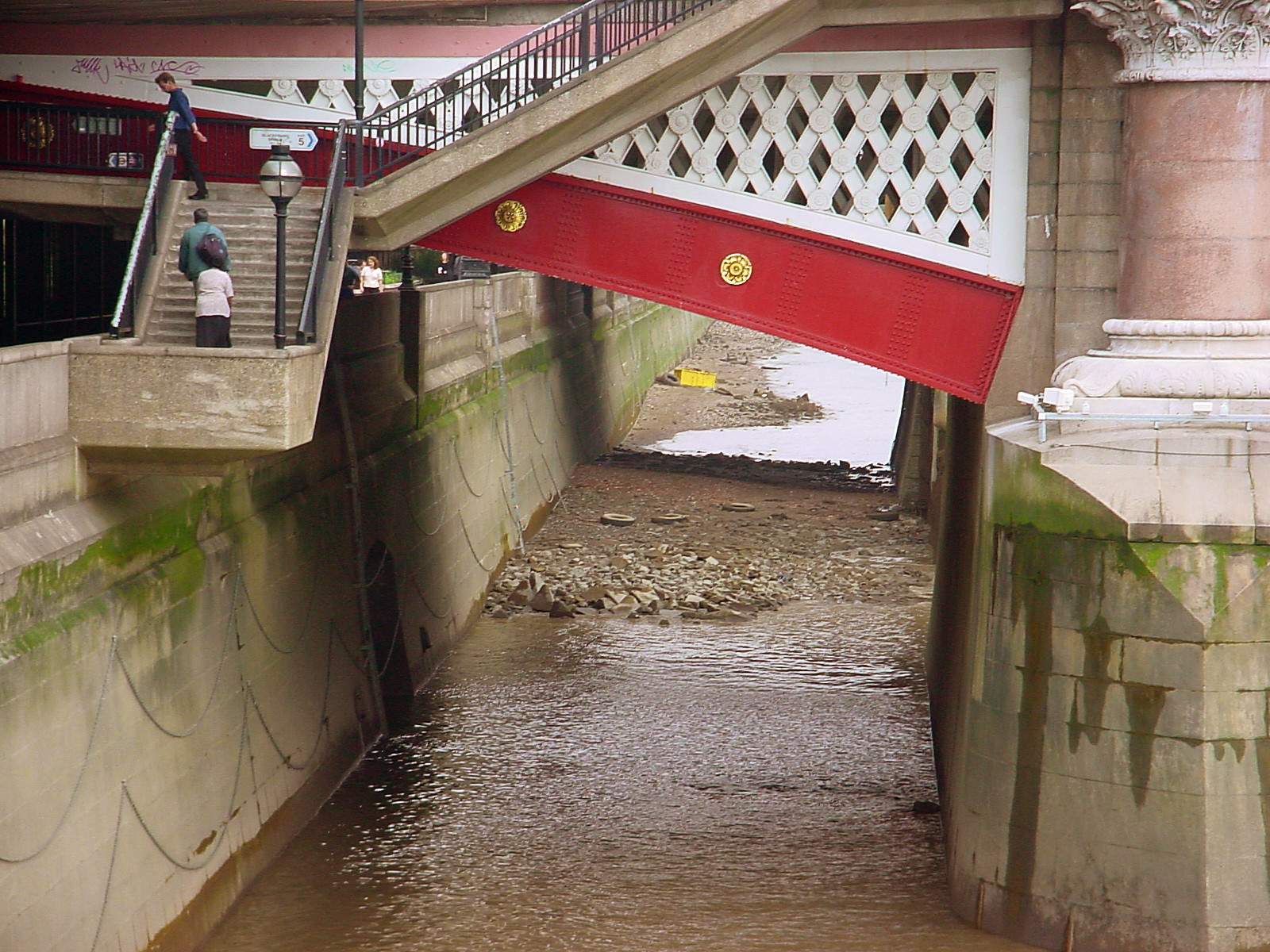
The Fleet mouth (an outfall in shadow) before the Tideway project

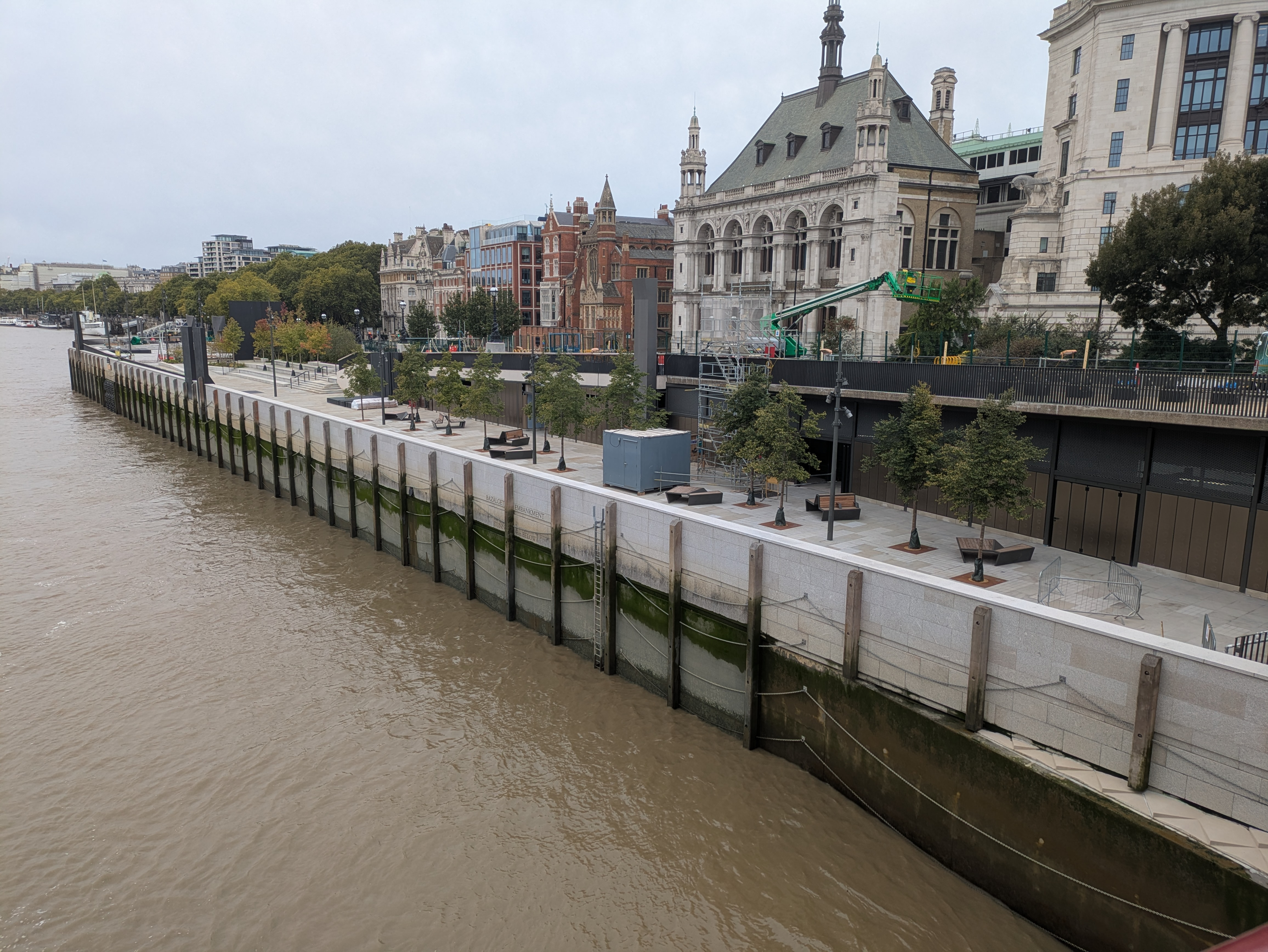
The new Fleet mouth, a CSO outfall, at Bazalgette Embankment (far left)

== History ==
In Roman times, the Fleet was a major river, with its estuary possibly containing the oldest tidal mill in the world. The river secured the western flank of the Roman City.

Londinium in the year 400 showing the Fleet to its west. The tributary Fagswell Brook is shown running from east to west.

In Anglo-Saxon times, the Fleet was still a substantial body of water, joining the Thames through a marshy tidal basin over 100 yards (91 m) wide at the mouth of the Fleet Valley. Many wells were built along its banks, and some on springs (Bagnigge Wells, Clerkenwell) and St Bride's Well, were reputed to have healing qualities; in the 13th century, the river was called River of Wells. The small lane at the south-west end of New Bridge Street is called Watergate because it was the river entrance to Bridewell Palace.

As London grew, the river became increasingly a sewer. The area came to be characterised by poor-quality housing and prisons: Bridewell Palace itself was converted into a prison; Newgate, Fleet and Ludgate prisons were all built in that area. In 1728 Alexander Pope wrote in his Dunciad, "To where Fleet-ditch with disemboguing streams / Rolls the large tribute of dead dogs to Thames / The king of dykes! than whom no sluice of mud / with deeper sable blots the silver flood".

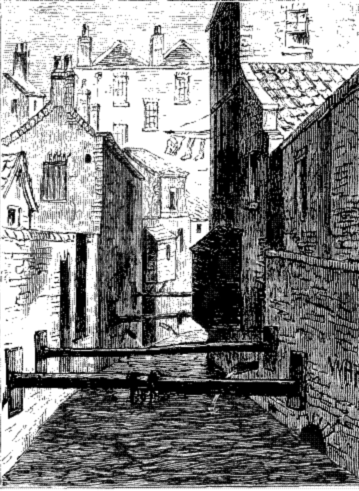
The Fleet Ditch in 1844

Following the Great Fire of London in 1666, architect Christopher Wren's proposal for widening the river was rejected. Rather, the Fleet was converted into the New Canal, completed in 1680 under the supervision of Robert Hooke. Newcastle Close and Old Seacoal Lane (now just short alleyways off Farringdon Street) recall the wharves that used to line this canal, especially used by the coastal coal trade from the north-east of England. (An adjacent narrow road, Seacoal Lane, also existed until the late 20th century, when the present building fronting onto Farringdon Street was built, perhaps suggesting that a new wharf had been built near the old one.)

Fleet Ditch Act 1732
- Act of Parliament
- Parliament of Great Britain
- Long title: An Act for filling up such Part of the Channel of Bridewell Dock and Fleet Ditch as lies between Holborn Bridge and Fleet Bridge; and for converting the Ground, when filled up, to the Use of the City of London.
- Citation: 6 Geo. 2. c. 22
- Territorial extent: Great Britain

Dates
- Royal assent: 17 May 1733
- Commencement: 16 January 1733 (Note: Start of session.)
Other legislation
Relates to	Rebuilding of London Act 1670

Status: Current legislation

Text of statute as originally enacted

The upper canal, unpopular and unused, was from 1737 enclosed between Holborn and Ludgate Circus to form the "Fleet Market". The lower part, the section from Ludgate Circus to the Thames, had been covered by 1769 for the opening of the new Blackfriars Bridge and was consequently named "New Bridge Street".

The development of the Regent's Canal and urban growth covered the river in King's Cross and Camden from 1812. The Fleet Market was closed during the 1860s with the construction of Farringdon Road and Farringdon Street as a highway to the north and the Metropolitan Railway, while the final upper section of the river was covered when Hampstead was expanded in the 1870s.

The history of the River Fleet was documented by the 19th-century artist and historian Anthony Crosby. His sketches and notes are held in the Crosby Collection at The London Archives. The archive has been used extensively by researchers, historians and publishers to provide images and contemporary descriptions of the 19th-century Fleet during the period when it was undergoing significant change.

== Cultural references ==
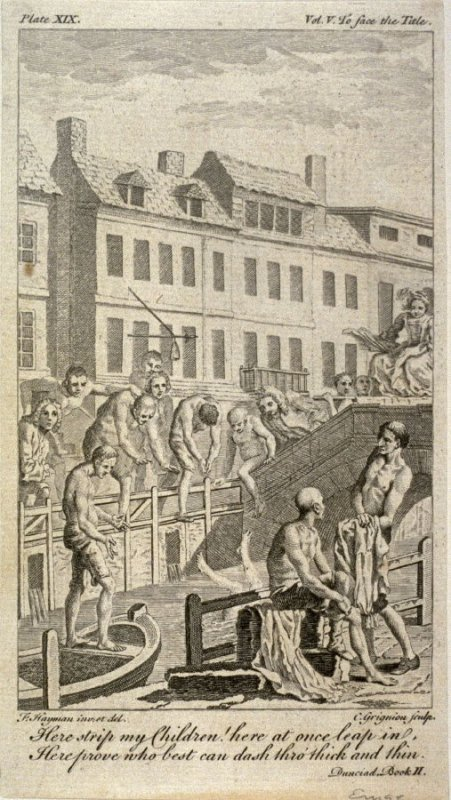
Bridge over the New Canal at Holborn: illustration from Alexander Pope's Dunciad (1728). The bathers are included in satirical allusion to the poor quality of the water.

- Ben Jonson's poem "On the Famous Voyage" provides a mock-epic account of a journey along the excrement-lined ditch during the early 17th century.
- Jonathan Swift (author of Gulliver's Travels) mentions the filth in the Fleet during a storm in a poem of 1710:
  Sweepings from Butchers Stalls, Dung, Guts and Blood,
  Drown'd Puppies, stinking Sprats, all drench'd in Mud,
  Dead Cats and Turnip-Tops come tumbling down the Flood.
- In Dickens' Oliver Twist (1837–39), Fagin's lair is on Saffron Hill, adjacent to the Fleet (and in some adaptations, reached by a footbridge across it, which collapses under the weight of pursuers).
- In the Lord Peter Wimsey detective novel Thrones, Dominations, set in 1936 London and begun by Dorothy L. Sayers, but completed by Jill Paton Walsh and published in 1998, Wimsey and Police Superintendent Charles Parker descend into the Fleet and nearby subterranean rivers, in search of the body of a murder victim – and barely escape drowning when a sudden heavy rain causes a flood underground.
- In The Door in the Wall (1949), Marguerite de Angeli's juvenile fiction set in early-14th-century England, Brother Luke soothes lame Robin's anger at being called Crookshanks by explaining to him that they are all named for some quality unique to themselves. He gives as an example Geoffry Atte-Water "because he lives by the River Fleet and tends the conduit there with his father".
- The 1966 Modesty Blaise strip cartoon story "The Head Girls" features the underground section of the Fleet, where Modesty and Willie Garvin are tethered by the villainous Gabriel in the expectation that the rising tide will drown them.
- The 19th-century Fleet is part of one of the settings a story of the Doctor Who serial "The Talons of Weng-Chiang" (1977), starring Tom Baker: in one episode the Doctor claims he once caught a large salmon in the Fleet, which he shared with the Venerable Bede. It is also mentioned in the Eighth Doctor audio adventure Dead London.
- In Neil Gaiman's television serial and novel Neverwhere (1996), the Great Beast of London is said to be a feral boar hog that ran into the Fleet while it was still partially open to the air, and vanished underground into the depths of London Below, growing huge and fat off the sewage.
- The 2003–2004 Baroque Cycle, Neal Stephenson's three volumes series set in the late 17th and early 18th centuries, has many references to the Fleet Ditch, including discussion of the polluted state of the waterway.
- The Christopher Fowler crime thriller The Water Room (2004) uses the Fleet as a major setting.
- In Guy Ritchie's Sherlock Holmes (2009), a blindfolded Sherlock (played by Robert Downey Jr.) uses the presence of the bump at the 'Fleet Conduit' in order to gain his bearings: "After that, the carriage forked left, then right, and then the tell-tale bump at the Fleet Conduit."
- In John Twelve Hawks "The Golden City" (The Fourth Realm Trilogy) 2010, the Fleet is an important part of the chapters 29 and 30.
- The Fleet is mentioned in the novel Rivers of London (2011) by Ben Aaronovitch; and in Blue Monday (2011) by crime novelist Nicci French.
- "London Underground", a 2014 episode (Season 11 episode 5) of BBC One drama New Tricks, features a storyline about a murder by an occult group in the 1970s who believed that the Fleet demanded human sacrifices. Airdate 15 September 2014
- The novel Goodnight, John-Boy (2017) by Pat Mills depicts the disposal of a murder victim's body through an access hatch into the Fleet sewer pipe, where it is washed out into the Thames.
- Fleet, a sequence of poems by Paul O'Prey published in 2021, traces the course of the buried river.

== See also ==
- Tributaries of the River Thames
- Subterranean rivers of London
- List of rivers in England

== Notes ==
Next confluence upstream	River Thames	Next confluence downstream
River Effra (south)	River Fleet	River Walbrook (north)
