= Prince William Frederick, Duke of Gloucester and Edinburgh =

British prince (1776–1834)

Prince William Frederick
- Duke of Gloucester and Edinburgh
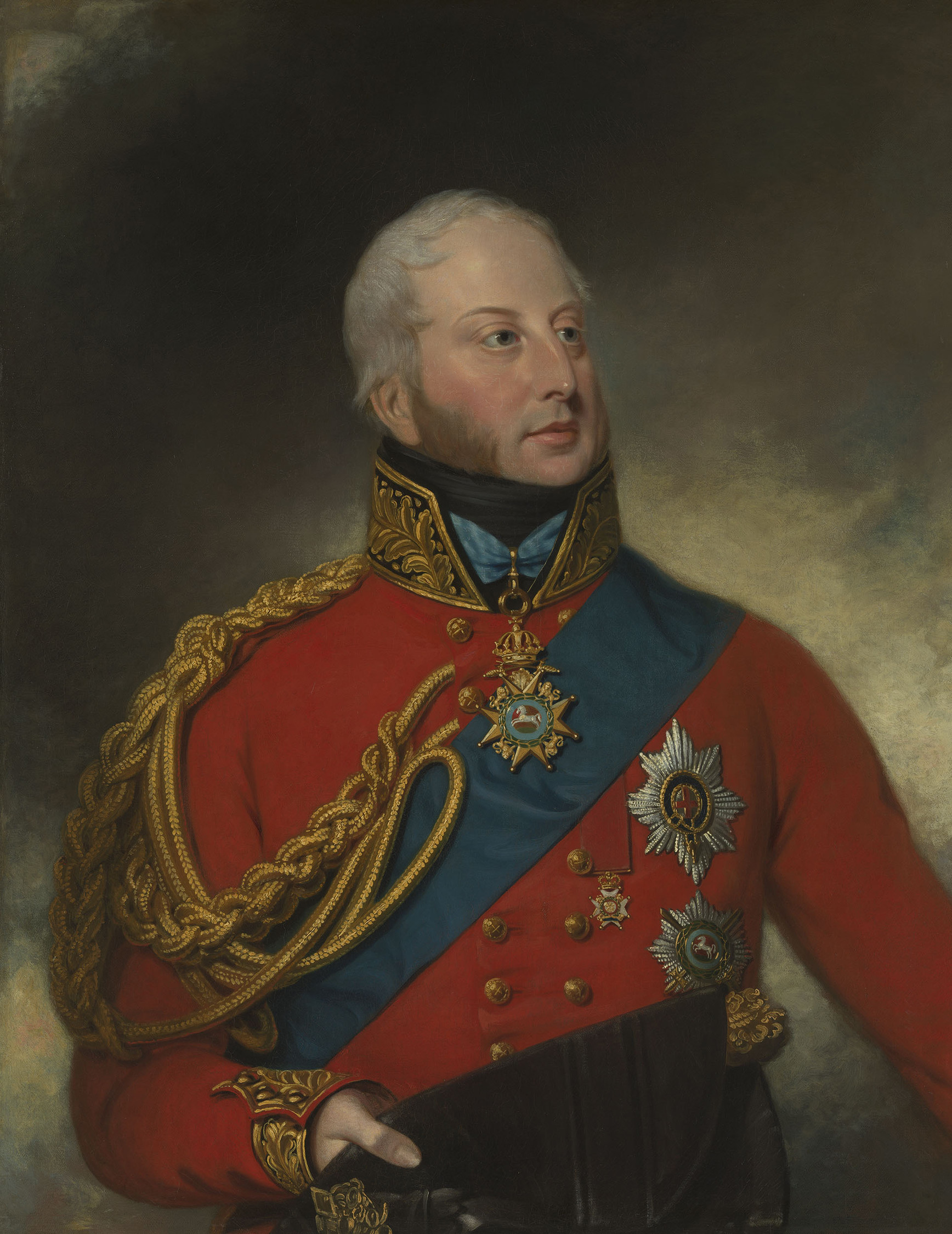
- The Duke of Gloucester, c. late 1810s
- Born: Prince William Frederick of Gloucester; 15 January 1776; Teodoli Palace, Rome, Papal States
- Died: 30 November 1834 (aged 58); Bagshot Park, Surrey, England
- Burial: 11 December 1834; St George's Chapel, Windsor Castle
- Spouse: Princess Mary of the United Kingdom (m. 1816)
- House: Hanover
- Father: Prince William Henry, Duke of Gloucester and Edinburgh
- Mother: Maria Walpole

Prince William Frederick, Duke of Gloucester and Edinburgh (15 January 1776 – 30 November 1834), was a British prince and field marshal, the nephew and son-in-law of King George III. He was the only son of Prince William Henry, Duke of Gloucester and Edinburgh, and Maria Walpole, making him a grandson of Frederick, Prince of Wales and of Edward Walpole. In 1816, he married Princess Mary, the fourth daughter of George III.

== Early life ==
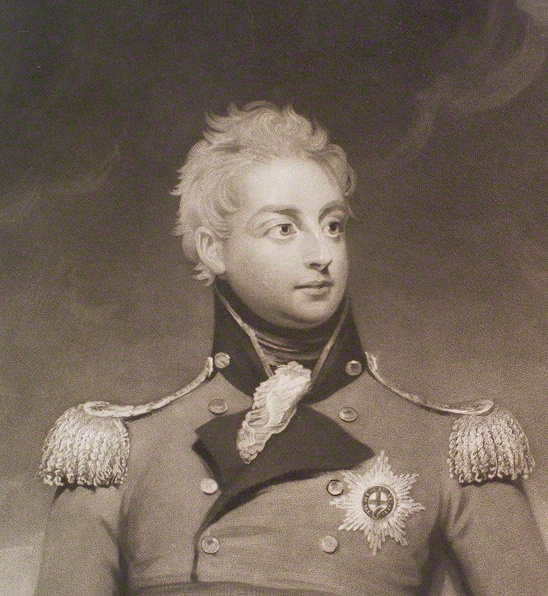
The Duke of Gloucester in an engraving based on a portrait painted by Sir William Beechey, published 1826

William Frederick was born on 15 January 1776 at Palazzo Teodoli in via del Corso, Rome. His father was Prince William Henry, Duke of Gloucester and Edinburgh, the third son of Frederick, Prince of Wales. His mother, Maria, was the illegitimate daughter of Edward Walpole and granddaughter of Robert Walpole. As a great-grandson of George II he held the title of Prince of Great Britain with the style His Highness, not His Royal Highness, at birth. He was baptised at Teodoli Palace, on 12 February 1776 by a Rev Salter. His godparents were his father's cousin and cousin-in-law, Ernest II, Duke of Saxe-Gotha-Altenburg and Duchess Charlotte; and the Duke of Gloucester's second cousin, Christian Frederick Charles Alexander, Margrave of Brandenburg-Ansbach.

During his stay in Stockholm in 1802–1803, William's interest and rumoured affair with Aurora Wilhelmina Koskull attracted a lot of attention, and he reportedly had plans to marry her. Queen Charlotte of Sweden recalled that William said of Koskull: "If she was your daughter, I would marry her!"

William was admitted to Trinity College, Cambridge, in 1787, and granted his MA in 1790. He set up his London home at 31 Upper Grosvenor Street, Mayfair. On 25 August 1805, William's father died, and he inherited the titles Duke of Gloucester and Edinburgh and Earl of Connaught.

From 1811 until his death, William was Chancellor of the University of Cambridge. He was offered the throne of Sweden in 1812 by some members of the Swedish nobility, but the British government would not allow it; the French marshal Jean-Baptiste Bernadotte was eventually selected to become King Charles XIV John.

== Military career ==
On the outbreak of war with France in 1793, William was commissioned as a captain in the 1st Regiment of Foot Guards, with the rank of lieutenant-colonel in the Army, backdated to March 1789. He was promoted to colonel on 24 February 1794, and served in the Flanders campaign from March to May that year. On 26 February 1795 he was promoted to major-general. From September to October 1799 he commanded a brigade of Foot Guards in the Helder Expedition, for which he was mentioned in despatches. On 13 November 1799 he was promoted lieutenant-general, and held various home commands before being promoted to general on 25 April 1808. On 26 May 1816 he was promoted field marshal.

He was colonel of the 115th Regiment of Foot (Prince William's) from 1794, then colonel of the 6th Regiment of Foot from 1795 and finally colonel of the 3rd Regiment of Foot Guards from 1806 until his death.

== Marriage ==
According to letters held in the archive of the artist and barrister's clerk Anthony Crosby, the Duke married Ann Maguire (1786-1850), in a clandestine ceremony on 6 July 1811 conducted at the house of his friend, Ann Hamilton, at 2 Grafton Street, Mayfair. The ceremony was reportedly conducted by Thomas Pettingal, Rector of Easthampstead, Berkshire, with those present including Hamilton, Lady Jane Lanesborough (the widow of Brinsley Butler, 2nd Earl of Lanesborough) and her husband John King. Maguire claims the Duke maintained a relationship with her until his death in 1834. No marriage certificate is known, and any such marriage would be invalid under the Royal Marriages Act. After the Duke's death an annuity of £200 per year was purchased for Maguire from the Duke's estate.

On 22 July 1816, William married his first cousin Princess Mary, the fourth daughter of King George III. The marriage took place at St James's Palace, Westminster. On that day, the Prince Regent granted the Duke the style of His Royal Highness by Order in Council.

The Duke and Duchess of Gloucester lived at Bagshot Park in Surrey. They had no children together; they had married when both were 40. The Duke had been encouraged to stay single, so that there might be a suitable bridegroom for Princess Charlotte of Wales, who was expected to succeed to the throne, if no foreign match proved suitable; she had married Prince Leopold of Saxe-Coburg ten weeks earlier.

== Later life ==
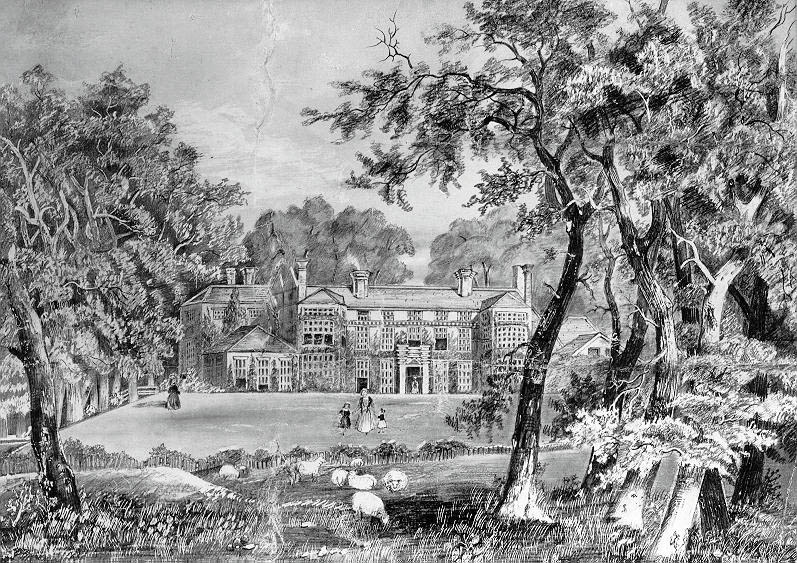
Prince William was a regular guest at Earlham Hall, seat of the Gurney family who, like William, were abolitionists and Whigs

William was active in many walks of life, and on 27 April 1822 he chaired the first Annual General Meeting of London's new United University Club. In politics, "the Duke generally voted with the Whigs" but only entered the House of Lords rarely and voted on few of the great issues of his time. He did advocate the abolition of slavery, and he supported Caroline of Brunswick and Prince Augustus Frederick, Duke of Sussex, against King George IV. In a speech at the House of Lords on 5 February 1807, he stated that

My lords, I cannot find language sufficiently strong to express my abhorrence and detestation of this abominable traffic in human blood; and I think the present question is the most momentous that ever came before your lordships: for what question can be more momentous, or come more closely home to our bosoms and our feelings of humanity, than that which concerns the welfare, the happiness, nay even the lives of myriads of our fellow creatures? Adverting to the resolution of last parliament, now on your lordships' table, declaring that the Slave Trade is contrary to justice, humanity, and policy, can you still allow British subjects to carry on what has been thus solemnly declared to be unjust, inhuman, and impolitic?

In the 1790s, William and his friends John Opie, who had painted the Duke's portrait, and his wife Amelia Opie were regular guests at Earlham Hall, the seat of the Gurney family who, like the Duke and the Opies, were Whigs and abolitionists. Upon John Opie's death in 1807, the Duke wrote a letter of sympathy to Amelia saying he was glad Royal etiquette allowed him to follow the Opie funeral procession in his carriage to St. Paul’s Cathedral where Opie would be buried.

The Duke of Gloucester kept more state than the King; he never permitted a gentleman to be seated in his presence (which King George did as an exceptional favour) and expected to be served coffee by the ladies of any party he attended, and that they would stand while he drank it. The general estimate of his capacity is given by his nickname, "Silly Billy"; he was also called "Slice of Gloucester" and "Cheese", a reference to Gloucester cheese.

In 1810 the Duke was one of the dupes in the Berners Street hoax organised by Theodore Hook who had mailed as many as four thousand people on various pretexts to visit the home in Westminster of a woman, Mrs Tottenham, at different times of the same day, in his case to attend the deathbed of a family retainer. He was among those who responded by visiting, to the householder's surprise.

Because of the unequal character of his parents' marriage, the Duke was excluded from the House of Hanover, being considered only a British prince. For instance, he and his sister Sophia were not listed in the genealogical listing of the electoral House of Hanover in the Königlicher Groß-Britannischer und Kurfürstlicher Braunschweig-Lüneburgscher Staats-Kalender. He was also not invited to sign the family compact of the house of Brunswick-Lüneburg in 1831, which means that he was not considered an agnate of the royal (electoral) house in Germany.

The Duke died on 30 November 1834 at Bagshot Park, and was buried in St. George's Chapel, Windsor.

Connaught Place, Connaught Street and Connaught Square in the Tyburnia district north of London's Hyde Park all take their name from his subsidiary title the Earl of Connaught. The area was developed in the 1820s and still features much of its original Regency architecture.

== Honours ==
This list is incomplete

- KG: Knight of the Garter, nominated 16 July 1794
- GCB: Knight Grand Cross, Order of the Bath, 2 January 1815
- GCH: Knight Grand Cross, Royal Guelphic Order, 12 August 1815

== Arms ==
Arms of Prince William Frederick

Arms of the Duke of Gloucester and Edinburgh engraved on a plaque fixed to a flintlock pistol. The two labels are just about visible. This is the post-1800 version, with an inescutcheon for the Electorate of Hanover.

William was granted use of his father's arms (being the arms of the kingdom, differenced by a label argent of five points, the centre bearing a fleur-de-lys azure, the other points each bearing a cross gules), the whole differenced by a label argent (or azure).

== Ancestry ==
Ancestors of Prince William Frederick, Duke of Gloucester and Edinburgh

8. George II of Great Britain
4. Frederick, Prince of Wales
9. Princess Caroline of Brandenburg-Ansbach
2. Prince William Henry, Duke of Gloucester and Edinburgh
10. Frederick II, Duke of Saxe-Gotha-Altenburg
5. Princess Augusta of Saxe-Gotha
11. Princess Magdalena Augusta of Anhalt-Zerbst
1. Prince William Frederick, Duke of Gloucester and Edinburgh
12. Robert Walpole, 1st Earl of Orford
6. Sir Edward Walpole
13. Catherine Shorter
3. Maria Walpole
14. Hammond Clement
7. Dorothy Clement
15. Priscilla Clement

== See also ==
- List of British princes

Prince William Frederick, Duke of Gloucester and Edinburgh House of Hanover Cadet branch of the House of Welf Born: 15 January 1776 Died: 30 November 1834
Military offices
Preceded by Sir Ralph Abercromby	Colonel of the 6th (1st Warwickshire) Regiment of Foot; 1795–1805	Succeeded by George Nugent
Preceded by The Duke of Argyll	Colonel of the 3rd Regiment of Foot Guards; 1806–1834	Succeeded by The Duke of Gordon
Preceded by Sir William Keppel	Governor of Portsmouth; 1827–1834	Succeeded by Sir Thomas McMahon, Bt
Peerage of the United Kingdom
Preceded by Prince William Henry	Duke of Gloucester and Edinburgh; 1805–1834	Extinct
