= Losing You (novel) =

2005 novel by Nicci French

- First edition
- Author: Nicci French
- Language: English
- Genre: Thriller, Mystery novel
- Publisher: Michael Joseph Ltd
- Publication date: March 2005
- Publication place: United Kingdom
- Media type: Print (Hardcover)
- Pages: 304 pp
- ISBN: 0-7181-4782-0
- OCLC: 71808214

Losing You is a suspense novel by Nicci French, 2006.

== Plot summary ==
The story tells about Nina, a mother of two, planning to go on holidays with her new boyfriend. However, the road away from the isolated winter bleakness of Sandling Island seems to be littered with obstacles, frustrating her plans at every turn. Most pressingly of all, her fifteen-year-old daughter, Charlie, has yet to return from a night out.

Minute by minute, as Nina's unease builds to worry and then panic, every mother's worst nightmare begins to occur. Has Charlie run away? Or has something more sinister happened to her? And why will nobody take her disappearance seriously? As day turns to night on the island and a series of half-buried secrets lead Nina Landry from sickening suspicion to deadly certainty, the question becomes less whether she and her daughter will leave the island for Christmas and more whether they will ever leave it again.

== Critical reception ==
Caroline Boucher of The Observer said that the novel has "mastered suspence" and that this "is a book that keeps you reading into the small hours". The StarPhoenix describes it as "a page-turner of a book on one of those subjects only too imaginable, and feared". Michael McGirr of The Sydney Morning Herald stated that the novel "is more single-minded than many books produced by a single writer".
