= The Memory Game =

1997 novel by Nicci French

- Author: Nicci French
- Language: English
- Genre: Psychological thriller
- Publisher: William Heinemann
- Publication date: 1997
- Followed by: The Safe House

The Memory Game is a psychological thriller by London journalists Nicci Gerrard and Sean French under the pseudonym Nicci French. It was their first novel and was originally published by William Heinemann in 1997.

== Plot ==
The novel concerns the account of Jane Martello, a middle-aged woman undergoing divorce proceedings with her husband and separating herself from the large, strong family she has known since her childhood. The intricate traditions of her family and the one she had married into begin to break down when the body of her sister-in-law, Natalie, is found buried in the garden after over two decades. This startlingly close distance to the house leads to the revelation of the murderer being very close to the family. The revelation brings down the family structure that for so long was unbalanced, but stable, with characters such as Jane's father-in-law, Alan, an openly crude and sexist novelist who frequently had relations outside his marriage (to the knowledge of the whole family).

Jane undergoes psychiatric counselling as she struggles with the mysterious circumstances around the death of one of her best childhood friends as well as the precursors to what appears to be a midlife crisis. She undergoes a memory exercise (which the book is named for) to unlock repressed memories from her friend's death. What she unlocks may be the key to Natalie's death, provided those around her believe them to be valid.

== In popular media ==
The book has been turned into a Dutch-Belgian movie called Het geheugenspel.
