= Land of the Living (novel) =

Novel by Nicci French

- First edition
- Author: Nicci French
- Language: English
- Genre: Thriller novel
- Publisher: Michael Joseph
- Publication date: 8 February 2003
- Publication place: United Kingdom
- Media type: Print (Hardback & Paperback)
- ISBN: 0-14-188673-0

Land of the Living (2003) is a psychological thriller novel by Nicci French, the pseudonym for a husband-and-wife team of English suspense writers, Nicci Gerrard and Sean French.

== Synopsis ==
One day, Abbie Deveraux wakes up in the dark to find she has been kidnapped and tied to a chair. She can't remember how she got there, all she knows is her loved ones may be looking for her and she wants to escape this prison. She manages to escape. Going back to her friends and boyfriend she realises that her last few days with them had been strange. Ending her relationship with her boyfriend and quitting her job, she couldn't remember any of this, not even the fact that she had been seeing someone else. As well as this her friends don't believe her kidnapping and being tied up. In a fear that he knows everything about her, where she lives, where she goes, she wants to trace back her steps of what she had done the days before she had disappeared. In an attempt for him not to find her, she changes her image and style. But the mysterious incident continues to haunt her, she can't think of anything else other than getting the man who had tormented her and to find the other girls that he mentioned he had killed.
