= Catch Me When I Fall =

2005 novel by Nicci French

- First edition
- Author: Nicci French
- Language: English
- Genre: Thriller, Mystery novel
- Publisher: Michael Joseph
- Publication date: March 2005
- Publication place: United Kingdom
- Media type: Print (Hardcover, Paperback)
- Pages: 336 pp
- ISBN: 0-7181-4522-4
- OCLC: 57167611

Catch Me When I Fall (2005) is a psychological thriller novel by Nicci French, about a woman unknowingly afflicted with bipolar disorder, and how this sets her life on a spiral of self-destruction, as well as pitting her against a shadowy antagonist.

== Plot summary ==
Holly Krauss, a successful married woman who runs her own business with best friend Meg, finds her perfect life deteriorating as a result of foolish actions made almost subconsciously, including an alcohol fuelled one night stand and arguments with potentially dangerous men. After a mysterious stranger from one such incident begins imposing himself on her life, first through stalking and then physical intimidation, she wonders if she really is going insane, before inadvertently causing even more trouble by losing £11,000 in a poker game.

While good-natured and thoroughly empathetic, her artist husband Charlie is a procrastinator and therefore incapable of providing her with the support she needs. Only when Holly finally attempts suicide does she realise that all of her problems may not be simply a result of her own foolhardiness, but the work of a devious and determined psychopath intent on tearing her life apart...

== Critical reception ==
Sandy Amazeen of Monsters and Critics said "the ending is satisfying though predictable" and that "while not French's best work, overall this is an enjoyable read". The review in Publishers Weekly says "the muddled plot and unsympathetic heroine make this suspense thriller less satisfying than others by French". The review in Kirkus Reviews states that the author French "performs as expected".
