= The Red Room (French novel) =

2001 novel by Nicci French

- First edition (publ. Michael Joseph)
- Author: Nicci French
- Genre: Psychological thriller
- Publisher: Warner/Mysterious
- Publication date: August 7, 2001
- ISBN: 0-89296-730-7

The Red Room is a 2001 psychological thriller novel by Nicci French, the pseudonym of English husband-and-wife team Nicci Gerrard and Sean French.

== Plot introduction ==
Kit Quinn is a psychologist who ends up scarred after meeting a troubled arrested man. When she goes back to work after the incident she is asked to review a case for the police, in which the man who scarred her is the main suspect. Against everyone else's suggestions she decides to defend this man, at least until more evidence is found. Her suspicions end up proven and in the end she solves the case in the manner of the most experienced detective (which she is not).
