= What to Do When Someone Dies =

Novel by Nicci French

What To Do When Someone Dies
- First edition
- Author: Nicci French
- Language: English
- Publisher: Penguin books
- Publication date: 2009
- Publication place: United Kingdom
- Media type: Print (Paperback & Hardback)
- Pages: 384
- ISBN: 978-0-14-102092-1

What To Do When Someone Dies is a 2009 novel by Nicci French. It concerns a young woman whose husband dies in mysterious circumstances, and her struggle to deal with her bereavement and make sense of his death.

== Adaptation ==
The novel was dramatised for television as a three-part series, Without You, in 2011. It was later adapted into a miniseries which now streams on both Acorn TV and PBS Passport. The series was directed by Tim Fywell, and starred Marc Warren, and Anna Friel. The first episode of the series debuted January 26, 2023.
