= 115th Regiment of Foot (Prince William's) =

Infantry regiment of the British Army

The 115th Regiment of Foot (Prince William's) was an infantry regiment of the British Army from 1794 to 1795. It was raised in May 1794, named for its colonel Prince William Frederick, Duke of Gloucester and Edinburgh, but was disbanded the following year.
