= Anthony Crosby =

English artist and barrister's clerk from London

- Born: 1792; Holborn, England
- Died: 17 November 1857 (aged 64–65); St Pancras, London

Academic work
- Main interests: Artist and historian who documented the River Fleet and its surrounding area
- Notable works: Crosby Collection

Anthony Crosby was an English artist, historian, and Barrister's Clerk in the 19th century. He is remembered for his notes and sketches of the River Fleet and its surrounding areas in London before it was covered and became a subterranean river. Though he had planned to publish these works in a book titled "Views of the River Fleet," it was never completed before his death in 1857. Nevertheless, his sketches and notes were later used in historical books and are currently housed in the Crosby Collection at the London Metropolitan Archives.

Crosby was also the Honorary Secretary for the Society for Promoting Practical Design, Secretary to The Museum Club and the author of correspondence to the British royal family on the behalf of Ann Maguire seeking settlement for a claimed secret marriage to Prince William Frederick, Duke of Gloucester and Edinburgh.

== Biography ==
Crosby was born to Anthony and Eliza Crosby in 1792 and baptised at Saint Andrew, Holborn, London on 1 November 1792. His father was an attorney at the Court of King's Bench. Crosby married Sarah on 14 March 1824. They had a son, Horatio Byron (born 1824) and three daughters Elizabeth Marianne (1827), Ellena Levinia (1830) and Sarah Emma (1831). He died in St Pancras on 17 November 1857 of pneumonia.

== Career ==
In 1824, Crosby was a student of law at Mitre Court, Inner Temple, London. Later, Crosby worked as a Barrister's Clerk at 3 Stoney Lane, Lincoln's Inn, London in the office of John Miller.

== Central African Caravan Trading Company ==
Between 1818 and 1825, Crosby had grand plans to explore Africa. He tried to raise funds from the Duke of Gloucester and other capitalists for the creation of the “Central African Caravan Trading Company”.

== Views of the River Fleet ==
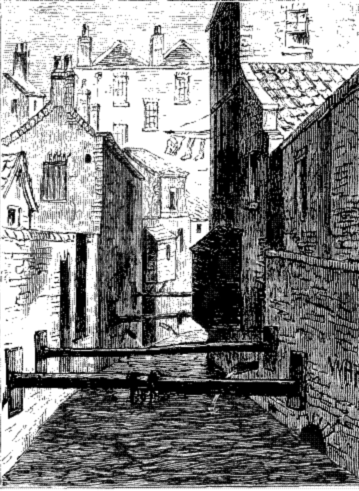
The Fleet Ditch in 1844

Crosby first tried to raise funds for a book, "Views of the River Fleet", in June 1832 to be printed by T Richardson of 245 High Holborn, London through subscriptions of one guinea. The books would consist of twenty engravings and include "historical notices from the earliest periods to the present time".

Further sketches and water colours were added in the period up to 1844. Crosby, was known to gather statements from locals knowledgeable about the transformations of the River Fleet and its surroundings over their lifetimes. He utilized these statements to produce sketches of what the river and its surrounding buildings might have looked like in the past. Crosby died in 1857 and there is no evidence the work was ever published in his lifetime.

The sketches and notes were sold at auction by Puttick and Simpson of Leicester Square on 19 July 1862 (lot 1718). They sold for £7 and 7 shillings. By 1885 the drawings were housed at the Guildhall Library, London. In 1888 his drawings were used in a publication "The Fleet: its river, prison, and marriages" by author and historian John Ashton.

The sketches are currently held in the Crosby Collection in the London Picture Archive at the London Metropolitan Archives. The archive has been used extensively by researchers, historians and publishers to provide images and contemporary descriptions of the 19th century River Fleet during the period where it was undergoing significant change from a free flowing natural river to a subterranean controlled water course as a result of the population expansion of the City of London.

Additionally, a dossier of correspondence, notes and other papers relating to the project are held at the Getty Research Institute in Los Angeles, California.

== The Society for Promoting Practical Design ==
Crosby was an inaugural member of The Society for Promoting Practical Design which was established in London 1838. He was elected to the post of Honorary Secretary in 1839. The purpose of the society was "promoting practical design and diffusing a knowledge and love of arts among the people" by providing public education in drawing and design. The society created a number of art schools, including one at Savile House, Leicester Square. In 1839 Crosby held meetings with Board of Trade to promote government establishment for schools of design. The society was instrumental in the establishment of schools of design across the country and the teaching of drawing classes in primary schools.

== The Museum Club ==
Crosby was secretary to The Museum Club, a brief London literary club founded around 1844 and closed in 1849, likely named because some of its founder members were readers at the British Museum. It aimed to be a properly modest and real literary club for literary men and artists and was composed almost wholly of authors and publishers with others from various professions in London.

The founders of the club included John Forster (biographer), William Macready and their friends. The club started life in a room above a house in Northumberland Street, Charing Cross and subsequently moved to premise at 5 Henrietta Street, Covent Garden.

At its peak it had over 100 members including Douglas William Jerrold (who in 1847 tried to convince Charles Dickens to become a member), George Henry Lewes, David Masson, Charles Knight (publisher), William Hepworth Dixon, Thomas Kibble Hervey, Shirley Brooks, Leigh Hunt, Francis Sylvester Mahony, Edwin Landseer, John Leech (caricaturist), William James Erasmus Wilson, George Smith (publisher, born 1824) and Moriarty (an Irish writer).

The Museum Club was the first organisation to propose a subscription for the purchase of Shakespeare's house for the national benefit. The activity was later taken on by The Shakespeare Birthplace Trust .

The Zodiac Club was a monthly dining club inside the Museum Club. It consisted of fourteen members, one for each of the signs of the Zodiac sign with an additional member each for Gemini and Pisces. Consisting of Jerrold (Scorpio), Moriarty (Taurus), Wilson (Cancer) as well as Hunt, Lewes, Mahony, Landseer, Macready and Leech. There was a penalty of one penny for failing to refer to a member by his zodiacal sign.

By August 1849, with falling membership, the Museum Club was dissolved by Crosby and the committee to avoid financial debt. The furniture was auctioned and after paying off debts, the remaining £30 or £40 was presented to Crosby as a gift. Subsequently, a number of the original members regretted not having a club to attend and a new club was formed named “The Hooks and Eyes” and then “Our Club”, all predecessors to the more famous Savage Club which is still going today.

== Ann Maguire and The Duke of Gloucester ==
Ann Maguire (1786–1850) of 38 Bryanston Street, Portman Square, London, claimed she was a widow and to have had secret marriage to Prince William Frederick, Duke of Gloucester and Edinburgh on 6 July 1811 and believed she was entitled to a settlement of £2000 per year. Crosby wrote multiple letters to the royal family and their representatives after the death of the Duke in an attempt to settle Ann Maguire's claim. The following details are according to letters copied out by Crosby and statements he took from Ann Maguire and others which are held at the London Metropolitan Archive.

Ann Hamilton (died 1814) was a friend of the Duke of Gloucester and “protectoress” to the younger Ann Maguire (née Davies) who asserted she was a widow with her son George from her first husband, Charles Maguire. In 1809, Ann Hamilton introduced Ann Maguire to the Duke who claimed his name was 'Major Sidney'. Under this alias, the Duke proposed to Maguire and revealed his true identity after her acceptance.

The Duke and Ann Maguire were married in a secret ceremony on 6 July 1811 conducted at Ann Hamilton's residence at Grafton Street, London by the Revd. Thomas Pettingal, Rector of Easthampstead, Berkshire, those present being John King (who died at Florence in 1823) and the latter's wife Lady Jane Lanesborough (who died at Florence, aged 90, in 1828 and was the widow of Brinsley Butler, 2nd Earl of Lanesborough, who had died in 1779), together with Ann Hamilton and an unnamed gentleman who had come as a friend with the Duke of Gloucester. On the same day the Duke settled an annuity for £2,000 a year for Maguire. The Duke maintained the relationship with Maguire until his death in 1834, but after his passing, only an annuity of £200 to Maguire was discovered by his executors.

On her deathbed in 1814, Ann Hamilton, signed a document intended for Maguire confirming the marriage's details, including the £2,000 settlement and the witnesses present. No legal marriage certificate was found, which probably would not have been valid under the Royal Marriage Act anyway. Ann Hamilton left items in her will to Ann Maguire and her son George.

Two years later in 1816, the Duke officially married Princess Mary, daughter of George III. However, he continued to visit and support Maguire, providing a substantial residence for her a few miles away at Old Bracknell House in East Hampstead, Bracknell.

The Duke died at his home at Bagshot Park, Surrey on the 30th November 1834. The people dealing with the late Duke's estate were;

• Colonel Sir Samuel Gordon Higgins (Knight Commander of the Royal Guelphic Order 1834, Equerry to the Duke., executor and trustee to the deed)
• Benjamin Currey (solicitor of Old Palace Yard, London, executor and trustee to the deed)
• James Scarlett, 1st Baron Abinger, (ex Attorney General and trustee to the deed)
• Messrs Drummond (bankers of 49 Charing Cross, London)

Higgins was present at the end of the Duke's life. The Duke had requested Higgins to inform Ann Maguire, after his passing, that she would receive a lifetime annuity from the Duke's estate, assumed to be two thousand pounds annually based on commitments made by the late Duke. However, Higgins had not yet seen the trust deed in Currey's possession. Higgins later stated that according to the deed, only an annuity of two hundred pounds per annum was directed to be paid.

After the Duke's death, Maguire became burdened with the costs of the staff and house at Bracknell. In her statements she claimed;

• She was promised an annuity of £2000 per year,
• She was promised money to pay the outstanding bills at Old Bracknell House,
• the Duke had left a sum of £5000 for the purchase of the house,
• She had been promised the title “Countess of Meredeth”,
• Her son, George, had been promised a position in the government becoming of his status and education.

Ann's son (by her first marriage) – was the barrister, George Joseph David Maguire (12 April 1808 to 1851) of 6 Raymond Buildings, Gray's Inn. He wrote letters to Currey and Scarlett in an attempt to see the deed, but they were rebuffed. Anthony Crosby was a friend of George and by May 1835, he was helping Ann Maguire to settle the deed with the Royal Family. He took this on in a friendly manner without payment.

Crosby made meticulous copies of the letters between Ann Hamilton, Ann Maguire and the Duke of Gloucester documenting Ann Maguire's secret marriage to the Duke and the promise of the substantial endowment. Those copies and the subsequent letters drafted by Crosby are held in the archive at the LMA.

An annuity for £200 per year was purchased for Ann Maguire in June 1835 by the Duke's executors, but she believed that more had been promised and was still owed (supported by evidence in the form of the letters from the Duke in 1811 and Ann Hamilton's statements).

Crosby then drafted a letter to be sent by Ann Maguire to the private secretary of King William IV (the Duke's cousin) requesting the protection of the Royal Family in her claim against the Duke's estate and a letter to the Arthur Wellesley, 1st Duke of Wellington. Francis Tarrent Fenton (1795 to 1845), a solicitor from Gravesend was appointed to produce a “Bill of Answers” regarding her case to be presented to a court of law. In 1837, The bill was presented to Kenyon Parker QC of Lincoln's Inn, it was dismissed with costs.

Further letters were written to the Duke of Cumberland (Duke of Gloucester's cousin and later King of Hanover). A letter to Higgins from Crosby also gained no traction. By 1838, letters were written to the young Queen Victoria, who directed the issue to be sent to Melbourne (the Prime Minister). Finally Crosby appears to draft an aspirational letter to the House of Commons requesting that Currey and Higgins are brought before parliament for questioning about their handling of the Duke's estate.

By 1839, Ann Maguire was in financial difficulties and unable to pay her bill to Fenton. She was also facing legal action from a Mr Butterworth. Crosby organised an agreement between Mrs Maguire with Lady Ramsey to rent out two rooms for £4 per week.

Maguire wrote further letters to the Duke of Wellington in 1841 and 1843 (held in the Wellington Archive) demanding a provision for her and her son. She claims she was still paying £30 a year in interest for the money she had to borrow to pay the rent and staff wages for the house at Old Bracknell House after the Duke's death. She claims the bills came to under £300, but not a shilling was paid by the Duke's executors or his family. Also that the large sums of money bequethed to Currey were intended for her use.

James Scarlett, 1st Baron Abinger provided advice to Wellington that her letters should go unanswered. He states that the majority of letters written to the royal family ended up in his possession and that he had advised them also not to reply. He describes her claims to the £2000 annuity and marriage as "pretend". The Duke of Wellington noted "that she better write to someone else on the subject".

Ann Maguire died in 1850 and her son George in 1851.

In December 1868, a number of years after Crosby's death, a catalogue of manuscripts and notebooks (now lost), formerly belonging to the journalist and author Charles Molloy Westmacott (1787–1868) were sold at Puttick & Simpson entitled “Curious Histories of the Offsprings of Royalty; The Duke of Gloucester and his Executors in relation to Mrs Maguire and her Son”. These were presumably the original documents that Crosby had copied out, but how they ended up with Westmacott is unknown, as is their current location (if indeed they still exist).
