= Ludgate Circus =

Road junction in the City of London

Coordinates: 51°30′51.00″N 0°06′15.97″W

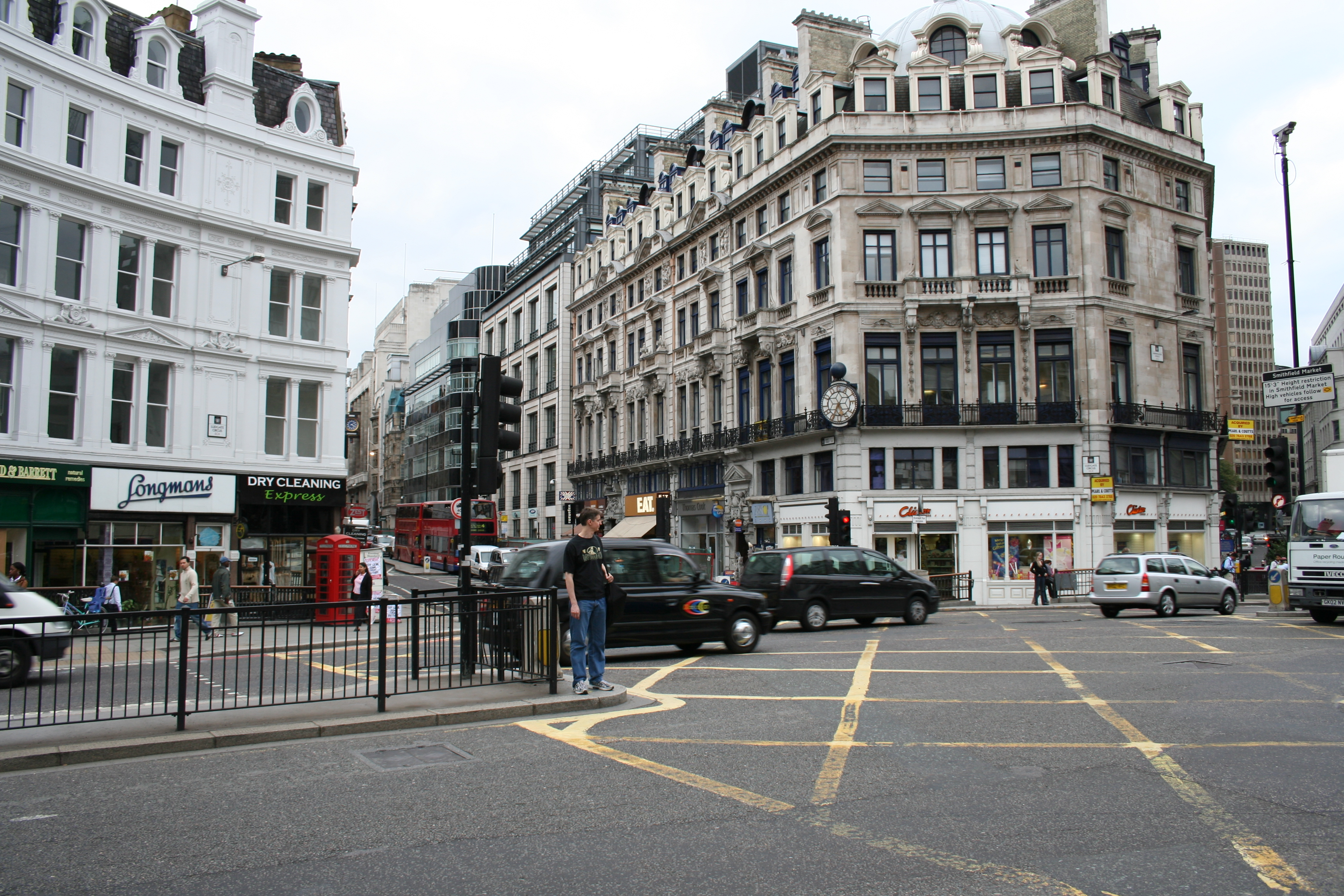
- Ludgate Circus pictured in 2006, looking north-west
- Interactive map of Ludgate Circus

Location
- London, United Kingdom
- Roads at junction: Ludgate Hill, Fleet Street, Farringdon Street and New Bridge Street

Construction
- Type: Intersection
- Opened: Between 1864 and 1875

Ludgate Circus is a road junction in the City of London where Farringdon Street/New Bridge Street (the A201) crosses Fleet Street/Ludgate Hill. (Ludgate Hill is a gentle rise to St Paul's Cathedral.)

Fleet Street was the only direct road between the cities of London and Westminster till the Embankment was opened in 1870. The Circus crosses the River Fleet, London's largest subterranean river. The concave-arced façades of the buildings facing the Circus were constructed between 1864 and 1875 using Haytor granite from Dartmoor in Devon transported via the prototype Haytor Granite Tramway.

In Charles Dickens' Dictionary of London (1879) the area was described as "Farringdon-circus".

== Etymology ==
The name Ludgate, according to Stow in his 1598 Survey of London, was derived from the belief that the gate had been created by the pre-Roman British king of London, King Lud, as many of his contemporaries believed. When a new gate was erected a statue on it depicted him, along with one of Queen Elizabeth I.

== Stations ==
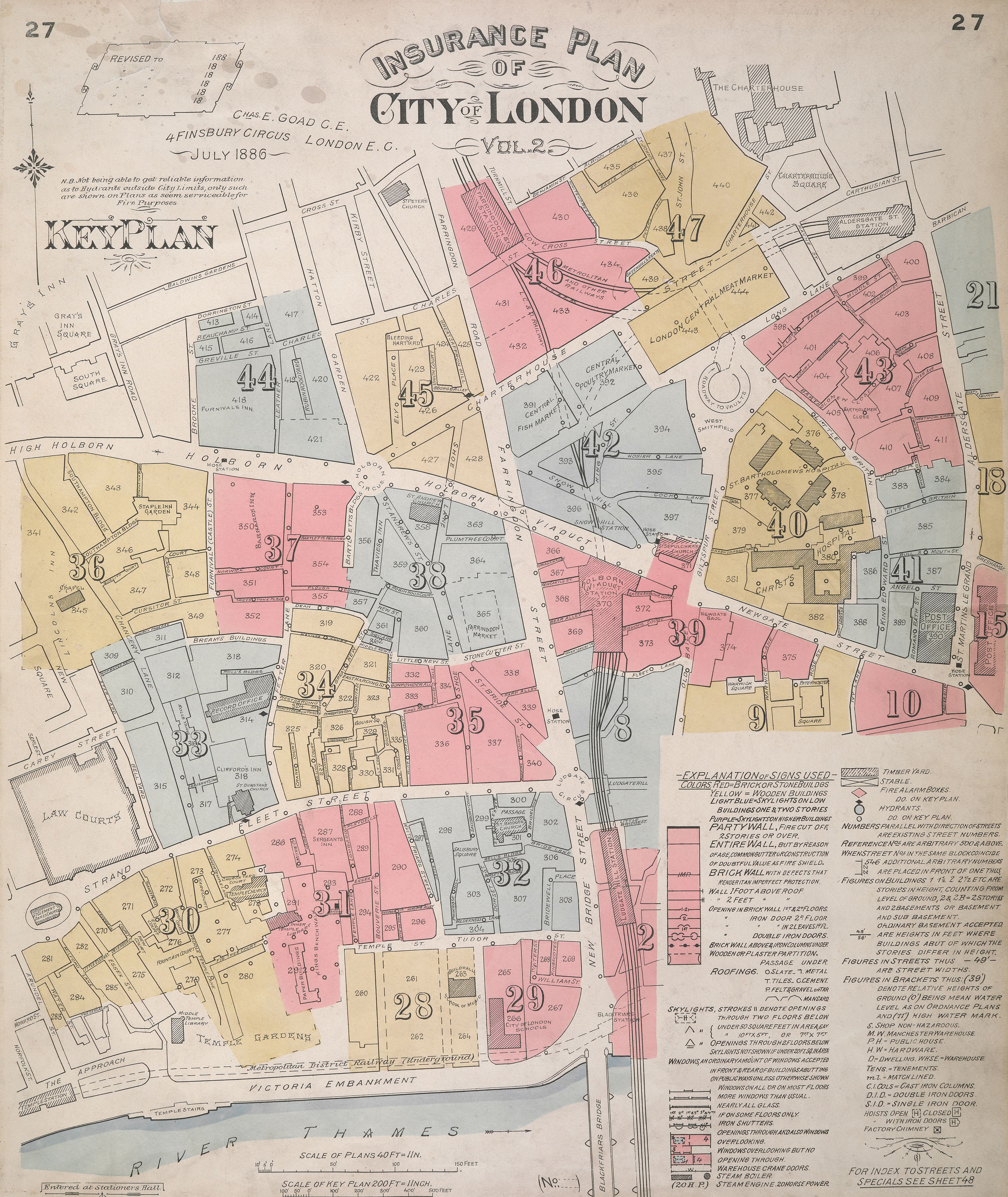
The site in 1886. Click for broader map and to enable varied magnification.

Had the Fleet line of the London Underground been built, it would have had a station at Ludgate Circus. However, the Fleet line's proposed route evolved into what is now the Jubilee line, which went south of the River Thames before reaching Ludgate Circus. In 1990 however, St. Paul's Thameslink (later renamed City Thameslink) was opened on the proposed site, abolishing Ludgate Hill and Holborn Viaduct stations. In an episode of Rumpole of the Bailey there is a wide shot of St Bride's Church and Ludgate Circus that was filmed c. 1988 before City Thameslink station was built.

== Public telephone ==
The Post Office's first coin-operated public call box was installed in 1906 at its Ludgate Circus branch, by the British subsidiary of Western Electric (incorporated in Britain in 1910).

== See also ==
- Ludgate Circus tube station
