= Killing Me Softly (novel) =

1999 thriller by Nicci French

- Author: Nicci French
- Language: English
- Genre: Crime; Mystery; Thriller
- Publisher: Penguin Group
- Publication date: 1999
- Publication place: United Kingdom
- Media type: Print (hardback & paperback)
- Pages: 307 pp
- ISBN: 0892966971

Killing Me Softly is a psychological thriller by writing team Nicci French from 1999.

== Synopsis ==
Alice Loudon, a pharmaceutical researcher who lives in London, leaves her boyfriend Jake to marry Adam Tallis, a mountain climber she met only recently. When Adam shows violent behaviour, Alice starts asking questions about his past. She finds out that he saved people's lives during an expedition on the Chungawat in the Himalayas. Several people had died on this expedition, including his former girlfriend Françoise. A woman who read an article about the rescue claimed to have been raped by Adam, but he has been acquitted. When Alice starts to suspect that Adam has killed several of his ex-girlfriends, people around her think she needs psychiatric help.

== Main characters ==
- Alice Loudon: pharmaceutical researcher who lives in London
- Adam Tallis: mountaineer with whom Alice has an affair and then marries
- Mike: Alice's boss at Drakon Pharmaceutical Company
- Jake: Alice's boyfriend at the beginning of the story
- Pauline: Jake's sister and Alice's closest friend
- Sylvie: solicitor friend of Alice
- Deborah: a Canadian doctor and occasional mountain climber who knows Adam
- Greg McLaughlin: expert Himalayan mountain climber and leader of the Chungawat expedition
- Joanna Noble: journalist from the Participant
- Tara Blanchard: a young woman who moved to London after her sister's death; her parents were once friends with Adam's parents
- Françoise Colet: Adam's girlfriend at the time of Chungawat; she was one of the people who died there
- Tomas Benn: a German client on the Chungawat expedition from whose point-of-view the opening passage of the book is described, as he lies dying
- Klaus Smith: mountain climber who took part in the Chungawat expedition and wrote a book about it
- Michelle Stowe: woman who claims to be raped by Adam

== Reception ==
Publishers Weekly wrote: "With lucid and limber prose, French delves into Alice's thoughts as skillfully as she describes the London setting. The pacing is swift and the dialogue sharp and realistic."

== Adaptation ==
In Kaige Chen's film adaptation of 2002, Heather Graham played Alice, and Joseph Fiennes Adam.
