= Palazzo Theodoli-Bianchelli =

The Palazzo Theodoli-Bianchelli is a building in Rome, located at 380 via del Corso, between via dell'Impresa and via del Parlamento, north of the Palazzo Verospi and opposite the convent of Santa Maria Maddalena delle Convertite.

== History ==
It dates to at least the early 16th century and was occupied by the family after which it was named until early in the 20th century. It was restored in 1884 Renovation work on the ground floor has revealed a 1947-48 mural painting by Gino Severini (1883–1966), "Macchina per produrre calze" ("Machine for producing socks), painted when the building was a sportswear shop. It shows a Cubist montage of a machine with tracks, drive shafts and cogs. The building now houses some offices of the Camera dei deputati, including its computer and personnel departments.
