= Nicci French =

British husband-and-wife writer duo

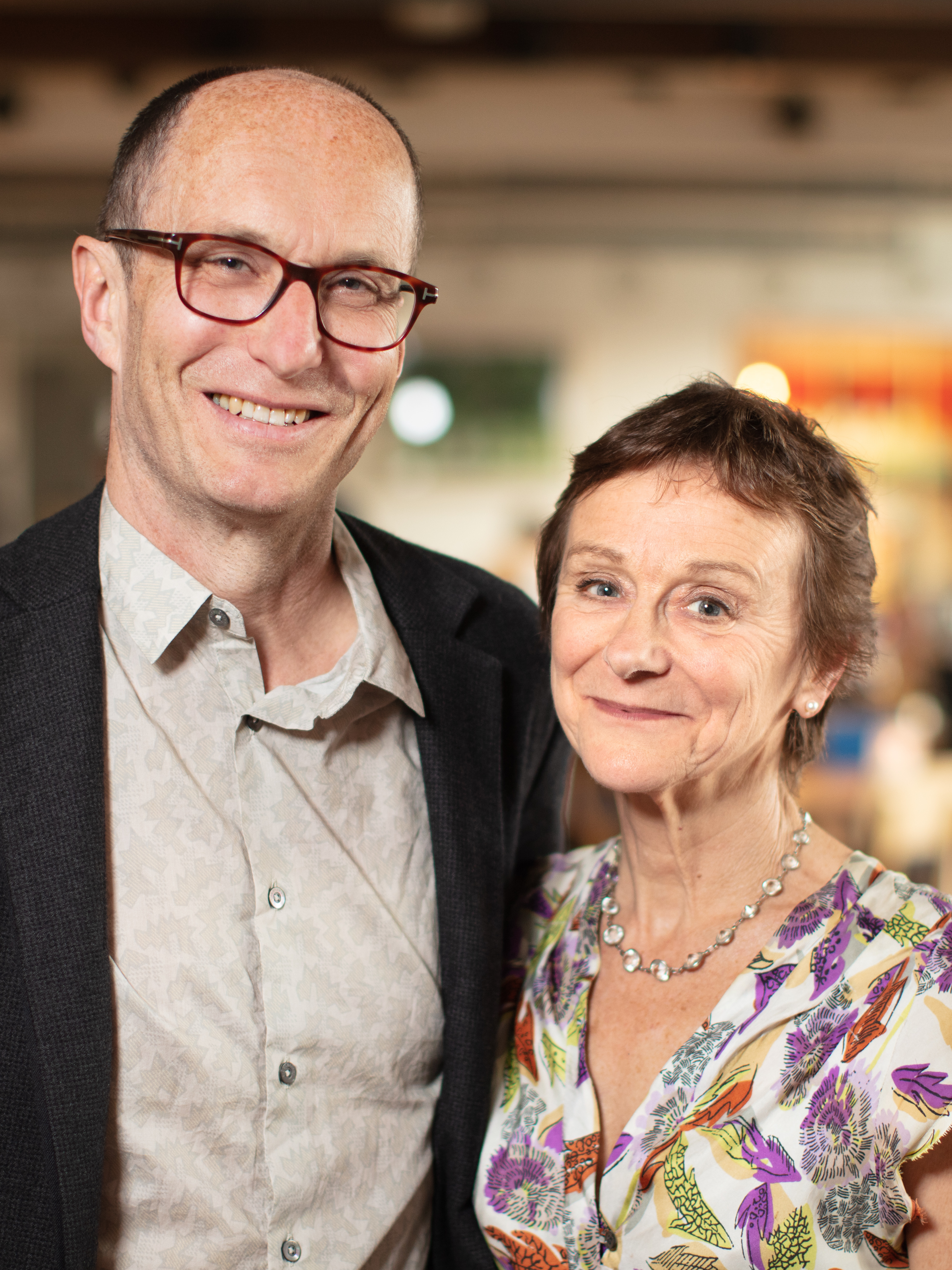
- French and Gerrard in 2018
- Born: Julian Sean French; 28 May 1959 (age 67); Bristol, England Nicola Gerrard; 10 June 1958 (age 68); Stourbridge, England
- Occupation: Writers
- Children: 4

Nicci French is the pseudonym of English husband-and-wife team Nicci Gerrard (born 10 June 1958) and Sean French (born 28 May 1959), who write psychological thrillers together.

The couple met in 1989 while working at the New Statesman and published their first co-written novel, The Memory Game, in 1997. Married and based in Suffolk, they write separately—Gerrard in an attic office, French in a garden shed—exchanging chapters by email and revising each other's work until they reach consensus.

By 2010, they had published twelve psychological thrillers, known for exploring ordinary people caught in extreme psychological situations. They described their shared pseudonym as having developed its own distinct voice and interests, particularly in the messy, morally complex aspects of human behavior. Their aim, they said, was not to offer escapism, but to make readers reflect uncomfortably on the darker parts of themselves.

Nicci French began their publishing career with Penguin Books under the imprint Michael Joseph, which released their debut novel The Memory Game in 1997. The duo remained with Michael Joseph for over two decades, publishing numerous bestselling psychological thrillers before moving to Simon & Schuster UK in 2018. The "substantial" six-figure agreement followed an eight-way auction and covers three standalone novels. The first book under the new deal, The Lying Room, was scheduled for release in October 2019.

In 2022, Simon & Schuster UK renewed its partnership with Nicci French in a new three-book deal. The first novel under this new agreement was slated for release in autumn 2023. The renewal followed the success of previous titles published by S&S, including The Lying Room, a Richard & Judy Book Club pick, and House of Correction, which was highly commended for the 2021 CWA Gold Dagger Award. The authors expressed excitement about continuing their collaboration with the publisher, praising the team's ongoing enthusiasm and support.

== Personal lives ==
Nicci Gerrard and Sean French were married in 1990. Since 1999 they have lived in Suffolk in East Anglia, England. Both have studied English literature at Oxford University. The couple have two daughters, Hadley and Molly, and Gerrard has two children from her first marriage, Edgar and Anna.

== Biography ==
=== Nicci Gerrard ===
Nicola 'Nicci' Gerrard was born on 10 June 1958. She grew up in Worcestershire, together with her two sisters and her brother.

She was educated at The Alice Ottley School in Worcester. She then studied English literature at Oxford University and then an MPhil at Sheffield University in 1986. She went on to teach literature in Los Angeles and London. She founded a women's magazine, Women's Review, before becoming a freelance journalist. During that time she married and had two children.

Following the failure of this first marriage, she met Sean French whilst working as editor for the New Statesman where French wrote a weekly column, but left when she was offered another job at The Observer.

In November 2014 her father John Gerrard died, his dementia having deteriorated significantly during a five-week stay in hospital for an unrelated problem and with very restricted visiting by his family. As a result of this Gerrard launched John's Campaign for extended visiting rights for carers of patients with dementia.

Since February 2019, Gerrard has supported the 'Save Our Libraries Essex' (SOLE) campaign, speaking out against the proposed closures of libraries by Essex County Council.

=== Sean French ===
Julian Sean French was born on 28 May 1959 in Bristol, the son of Philip French, a radio producer and film critic, and his Swedish-born wife Kersti (née Molin). He was, like his two younger brothers Patrick and Karl, educated at William Ellis secondary school in north London before studying English literature at Oxford University. The couple never met while there. While at Oxford University, French won a young writers’ contest organised by Vogue, and subsequently became a journalist.

In 1987 he gained his first column and until the end of 2000 he wrote a column for the New Statesman. His solo novel Start from Here was published in 2004.

== Works ==
=== as Nicci French ===
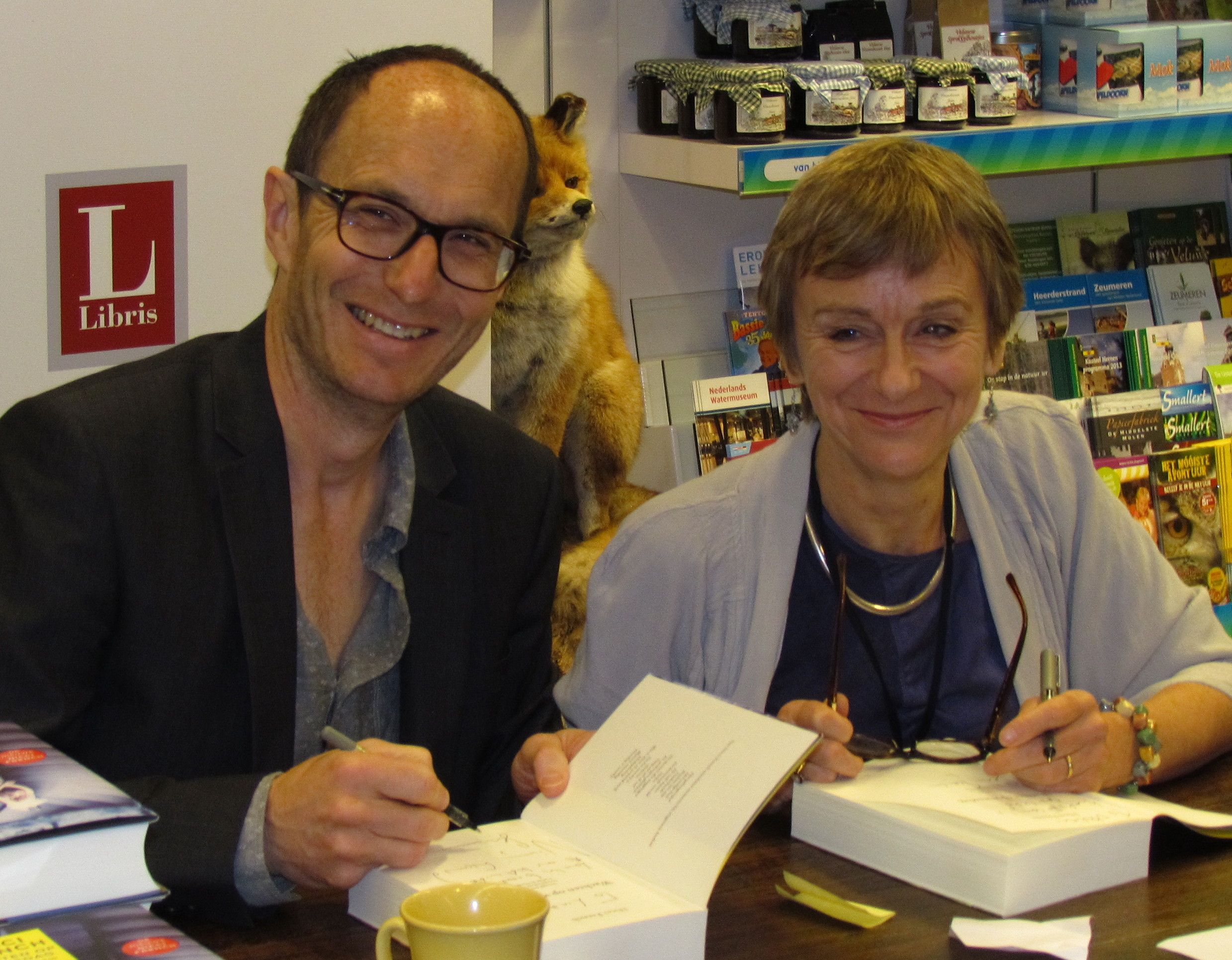
The duo at a 2013 book-signing event in the Netherlands

- The Memory Game (1997)
- The Safe House (1998)
- Killing Me Softly (1999)
- Beneath the Skin (2000)
- The Red Room (2001)
- The People Who Went Away (2001), a short story published as a novella for promotional purposes
- "Grieve" (2002), a short story published in Dutch as "Verlies" on the occasion of Thriller Month (Maand van het Spannende Boek)
- Land of the Living (2003)
- Secret Smile (2003), basis of British TV series Secret Smile
- Catch Me When I Fall (2005)
- Losing You (2006)
- Until It's Over (2007)
- "Speaking Ill of the Dead" (2008), a short story published for promotional purposes
- What to Do When Someone Dies (2008)
- Complicit (2009), published in the United States as The Other Side of the Door (2010)
- Blue Monday (a Frieda Klein novel) (2011)
- Tuesday's Gone (a Frieda Klein novel) (2013)
- Waiting for Wednesday (a Frieda Klein novel) (2013)
- Thursday's Child (a Frieda Klein novel) (2014)
- Friday on My Mind (a Frieda Klein novel) (2015)
- Saturday Requiem (a Frieda Klein novel) (2016), published in the United States as Dark Saturday (2017)
- Sunday Morning Coming Down (a Frieda Klein novel) (2017), published in the United States as Sunday Silence
- The Day of the Dead (a Frieda Klein novel) (2018)
- The Lying Room (2019)
- House of Correction (2020)
- The Unheard (2021)
- The Favour (2022)
- Has Anyone Seen Charlotte Salter? (Maud O'Connor series) (2023)
- The Last Days of Kira Mullan (Maud O'Connor series) (2024)
- Tyler Green Will Never Be Free (or What Happened That Night) (Maud O'Connor series) (2026), published in Dutch in 2025
- Wrong Turn (Maud O'Connor series) (2026)

=== Works solely by Sean French ===
- Patrick Hamilton: A Life (1993), biography
- The Imaginary Monkey (1994), novel
- Bardot (1995), biography
- The Dream of Dreams (1996), novel
- Jane Fonda: A Biography (1998), biography
- Start from Here (2004), novel.

=== Works solely by Nicci Gerrard ===
- Things we knew were true (Michael Joseph, 2003) – featuring teenage sisters, LCCN 2003-363056
- Soham (2004)
- Solace (2005)
- The Moment you were Gone (2007)
- The Winter House (aka The Middle Place) (2008)
- Missing Persons (2011)
- The Twilight Hour (2014)
- What Dementia Teaches Us About Love (2019)
