= Château de Chaillot =

Ancient French château destroyed in 1794

48°51′44.96″N 2°17′17.4″E

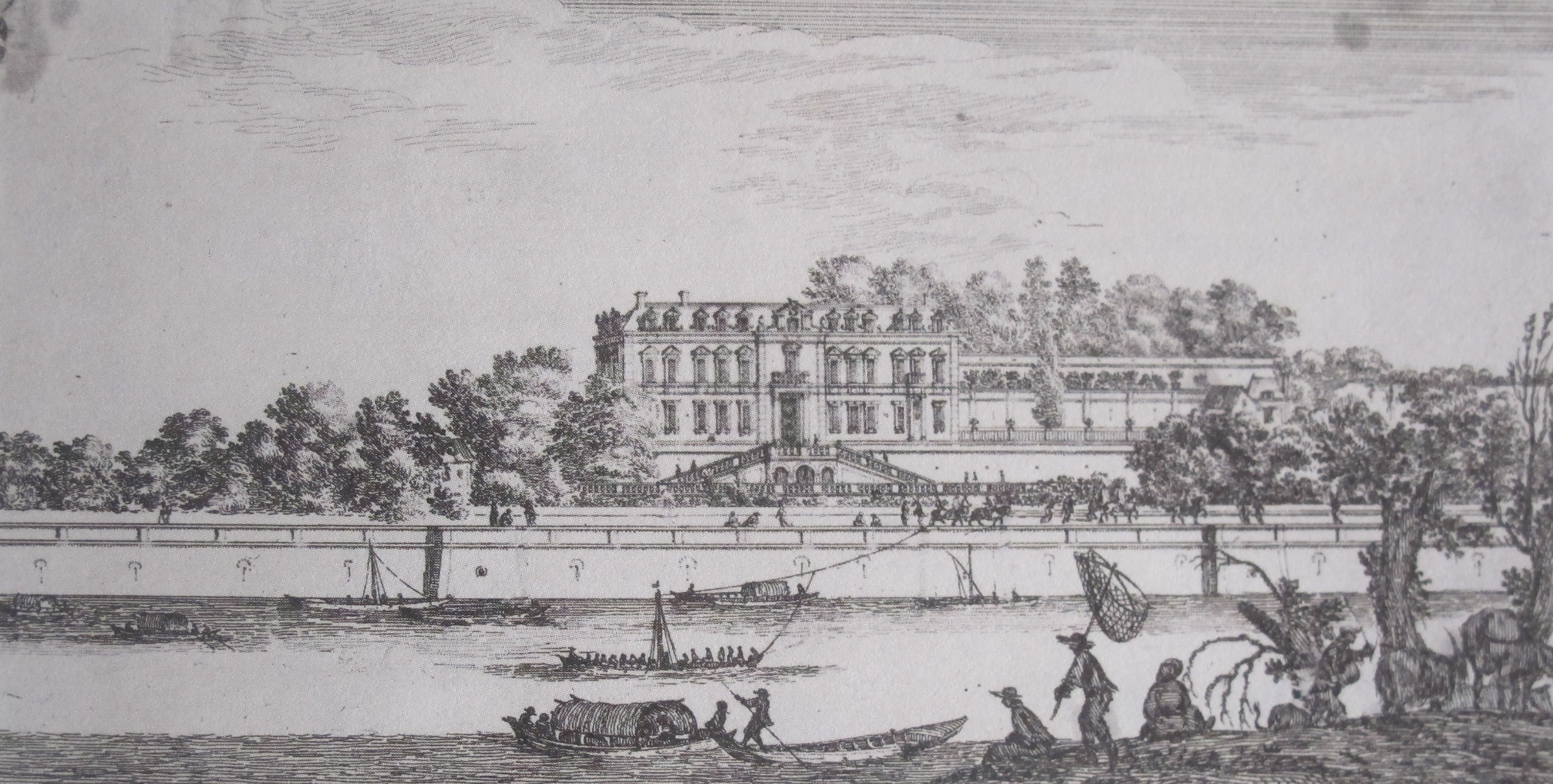
The château, a century after its construction by Dupérac and the additions ordered by Jeannin and Bassompierre.

The Château de Chaillot (English: /ʃɑːˈjoʊ/, French: [ʃajo]), also known as Maison de Beauregard or Hermitage de Chaillot, is an ancient château located near the site of the present-day Palais de Chaillot in Paris. It was purchased in 1651 by the nuns of the Visitation de Chaillot and was destroyed in 1794.

== Manor house ==
In the Middle Ages, the former manor house of Chaillot, on the corner of rue de Chaillot and avenue Marceau, belonged to the Arrode family of Parisian bourgeoisie.

Nicolas Arrode, provost of Paris in 1217, gave his name to an old Parisian street, part of today's rue Montorgueil. This manor house was marked by a square tower, shown on Saint-Victor's 1552 map of Paris. This tower, absent from depictions of Chaillot in the following century, seems to have disappeared thereafter. Next to the church of Saint-Pierre, this plan shows an otherwise unidentified château. This manor house is different from the one on the Chaillot Hill, roughly where the Palais de Chaillot stands today, which belonged to the nuns of the Visitation de Sainte-Marie in the 17th century along with the fiefdom of Chaillot.

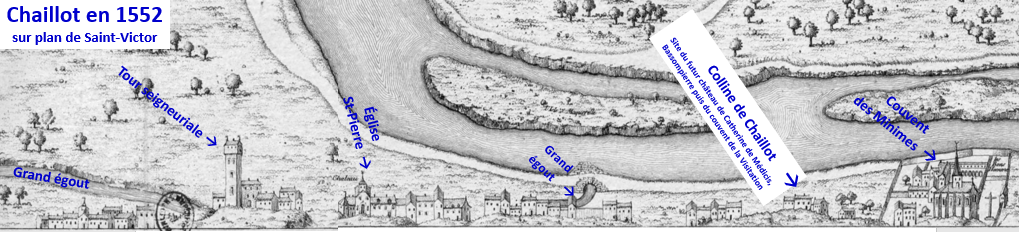
Chaillot circa 1550 on a Saint-Victor plan.

== Château on Chaillot Hill ==
- In 1542, Hippolyte d'Este (Cardinal d'Este and Archbishop of Lyon) bought a building on the Chaillot Hill.
- In 1583, Queen Catherine de Médicis bought this mansion or hermitage and the part of the estate of the convent of the Minimes de Chaillot located in the present-day gardens of the Trocadéro, extending to the northeast opposite the present-day Palais d'Iéna on rue Albert-de-Mun and the southwest between the present-day rue Le Tasse and avenue Albert-Ier-de-Monaco. (Note: The origins of the château before its acquisition by Catherine de Médicis are somewhat obscure, with sources giving contradictory information, such as: purchase of a hermitage from the Minimes convent or of a château from Cardinal d'Este? According to Saint-Victor's 1550 plan, there were houses on the Chaillot Hill (on the site of today's Place du Trocadéro), but not a château.) The queen had a château built there, called "Catherinemont".
  - The ancient architect Étienne Dupérac was commissioned to design a U-shaped château with terraced gardens and a courtyard in the shape of a racecourse.
  - However, the sovereign's enjoyment of the château was short-lived, as she died in 1589.
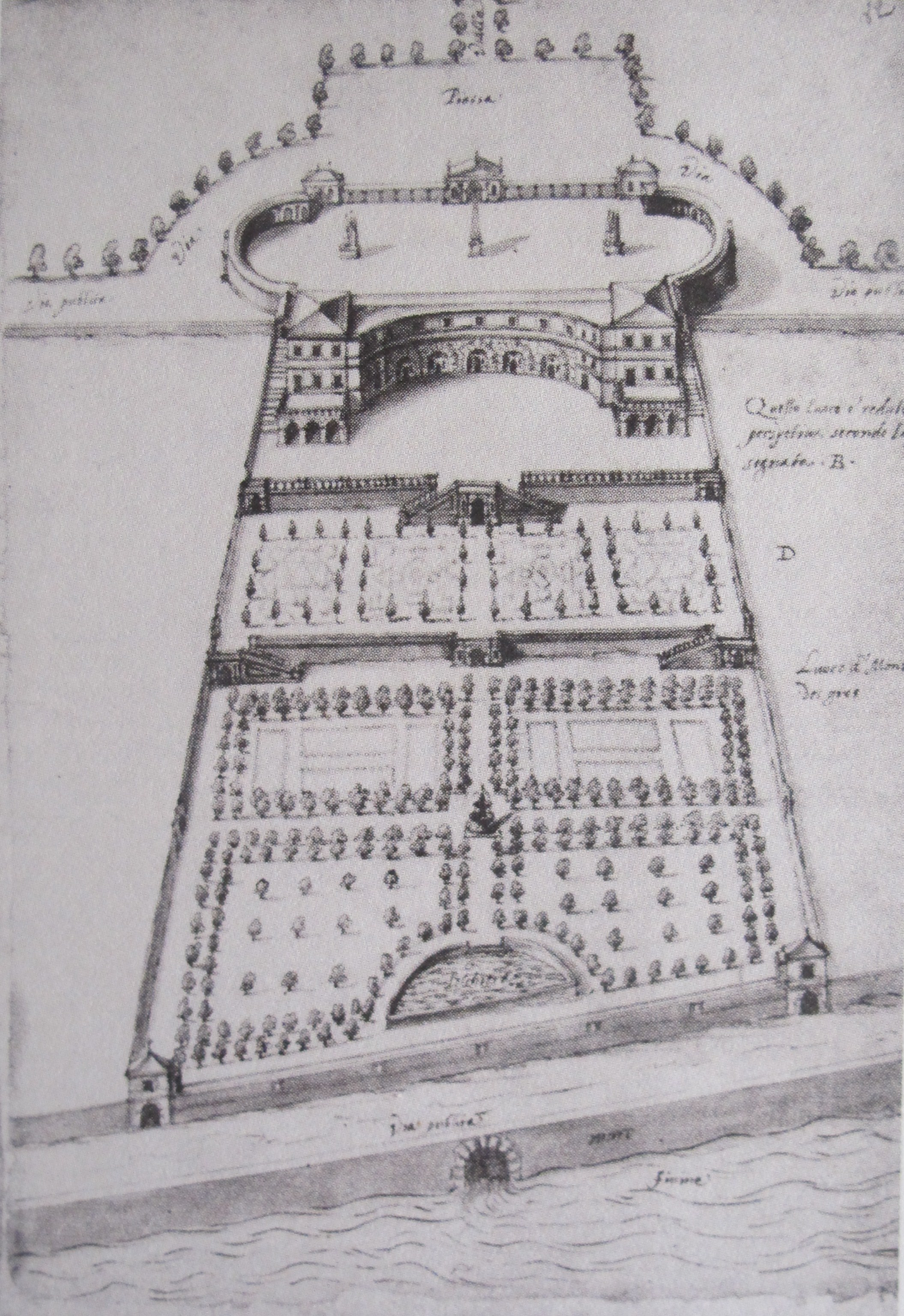
Oblique view of the château envisioned by Catherine de Médicis.

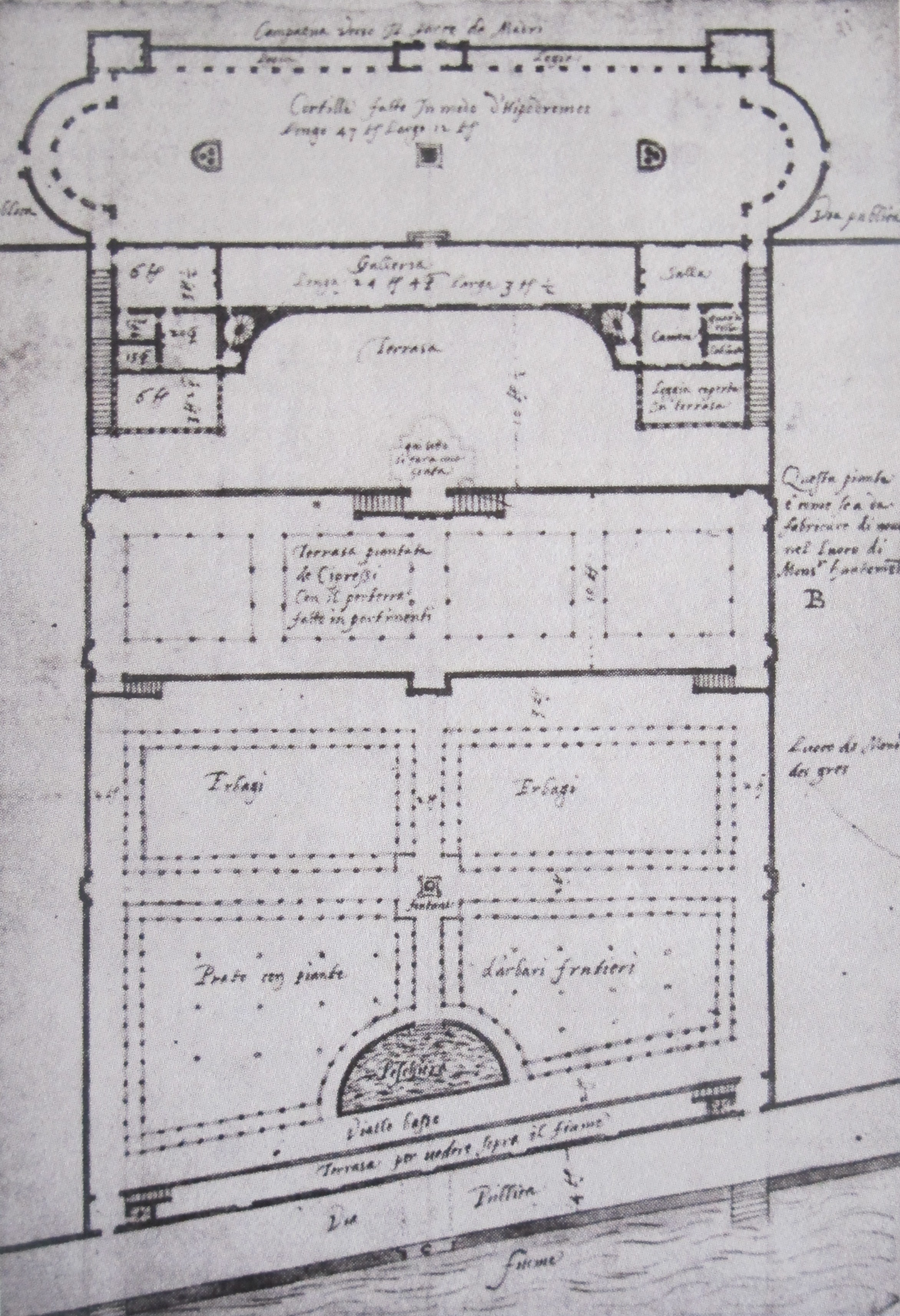
Plan of the château, which was never completed.
- Henry IV of France moved in during the siege of Paris in the summer of 1590.
- Like Marie de' Medici, Henry IV decided not to complete the work after the promulgation of the Edict of Nantes and the restoration of peace.
- The property was acquired by Diane de Corisande, Countess de Guiche et de Gramont, a former mistress of Henri IV, and then in 1613 by President Jeannin, who made alterations.
- Richelieu moved in in 1629 during Louis XIII's stay at the Château de Madrid, across the Bois de Boulogne.
- In 1630, Georges-Africain de Bassompierre bought it from Pierre Jeannin's daughter, leaving the usufruct to his brother, the Maréchal de Bassompierre, who embellished it. For his part in the conspiracy of Dupes Day, the Marshal was imprisoned in the Bastille from 1631 to 1643. During his imprisonment, the palace was requisitioned as a residence for the king's niece, the Duchesse de Nemours, and then again for Richelieu.

== Visitandines convent ==
When Maréchal de Bassompierre died in 1646, his penniless heirs decided to sell the estate. Henriette de France, the third daughter of Henri IV and widow of the executed King Charles I of England, a refugee in France since 1644 who wanted to live in a convent, chose Chaillot for the nuns of the Order of the Visitation, who bought the château, which the Bassompierres had bought for 80,000 livres, at auction on 12 May 1651 for 67,000 livres. Between 1687 and 1707, the nuns added a church. The buildings were destroyed by the Grenelle gunpowder factory explosion in 1794 after the nuns had left. To prepare the project palace of the King of Rome, the last remains were demolished in 1811.

== Buildings and outbuildings ==
According to a lawsuit filed in 1648 by the nephews of the Maréchal de Bassompierre, the property included three large courtyards, large buildings with several halls, kitchens, bedrooms, closets, two galleries, a chapel, stables, a gardener's house, and two pavilions. The whole complex stood on a walled estate of 30 arpents (about 15 hectares), including a park with staircases, ponds, fountains, forests, and a vegetable garden.

Its boundaries were:

- The Seine, the Minimes convent to the south.
- The road from Chaillot to Saint-Cloud to the west.
- A plot of land in the village of Chaillot to the north, i.e. the gardens and the Place du Trocadéro. A reservoir, filled by a pump drawing water from the Seine, fed the fountains in the gardens and the château.

== See also ==
- Convent of the Visitandines de Chaillot

== Bibliography ==
- Ory, Pascal (2006). Le Palais de Chaillot (in French). Actes Sud. p. 16. ISBN 9782742763924.
- Doniol, Auguste (1902). Histoire du XVIe arrondissement de Paris (PDF) (in French). Paris: Hachette.
- Roblin, Michel (1985). Quand Paris était à la campagne : origines rurales et urbaines des vingt arrondissements (in French). Picard. ISBN 978-2708401341.
- Fierro, Alfred (1998). Dictionnaire du Paris disparu : sites et monuments (in French). Parigramme. ISBN 9782840960997.
- De Andia, Béatrice (1991). Le 16e Chaillot Passy Auteuil Métamorphose des trois villages (in French). Françoise Campagne et Annie Flandreau, Le 16e Chaillot Passy Auteuil Métamorphose des trois villages. ISBN 9782905118394.
