= Convent of the Visitandines, Chaillot =

Convent of the Order of the Visitation of Holy Mary

Convent of the Visitandines de Chaillot
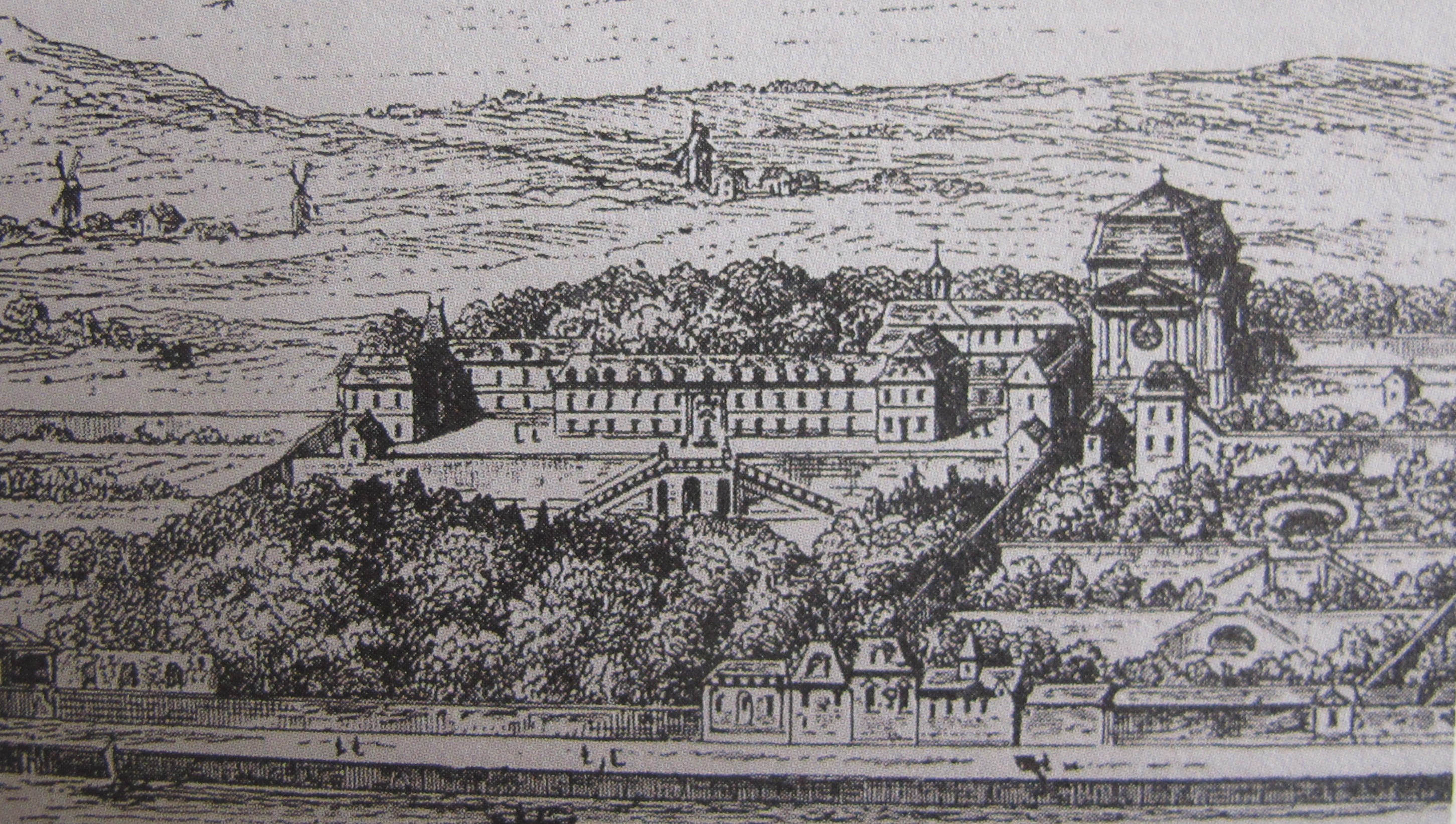
- Engraving of the Chaillot convent, circa 1774.

Religion
- Affiliation: Catholic Church
- Region: Île-de-France

Location
- Location: Paris
- Country: France
- Interactive map of Convent of the Visitandines de Chaillot
- Coordinates: 48°51′39″N 02°17′13″E

Architecture
- Demolished: 1794

The convent of the Visitandines de Chaillot was a convent of the Visitation order located west of Paris, in Chaillot, in what is now the 16th arrondissement. Consecrated in 1651, the convent was destroyed in 1794.

== Historical background ==
In 1583, Queen Catherine de Médicis bought and converted a hermitage on the hill of Chaillot, renamed "Catherinemont"; the architect Étienne Dupérac was commissioned to design a "U-shaped" villa with terraced gardens and a courtyard in the shape of a racecourse. However, the sovereign did not enjoy it for long: construction began in 1588 and she died the following year.

In 1613, this château overlooking the right bank of the Seine was purchased by Pierre Jeannin, First President of the Paris Parliament, and then, in 1630, by the Marquis de Bassompierre. On July 1, 1651, the property was purchased by the Visitandines at the initiative of Henriette-Marie de France, daughter of Henri IV and widow of Charles I of England, who established a community there. This was the order's third community, after those of rue Saint-Jacques founded in 1626 and rue Saint-Antoine founded in 1632, which was its mother house.

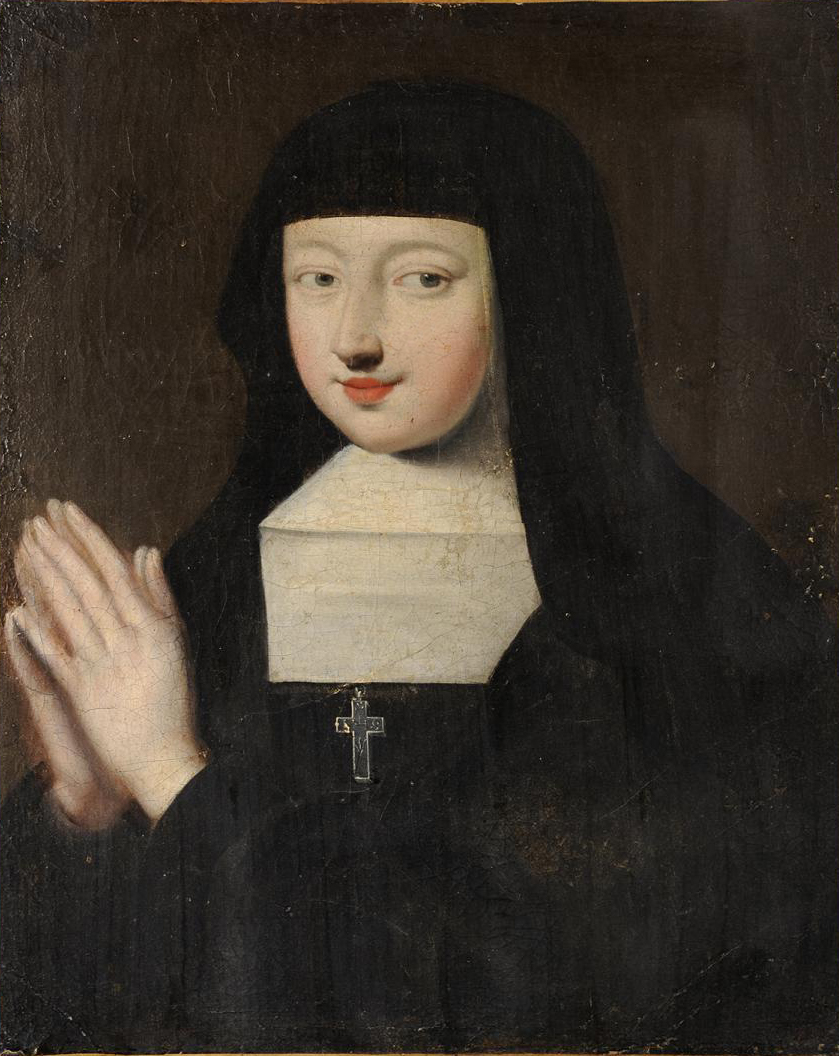
Louise de La Fayette, in religion Mère Angélique.

After fleeing rebellious England, Henriette-Marie commissioned the architect François Mansart to build a chapel here and invited some of her exiled court members. Mademoiselle de La Fayette (Mother Angelica in religion), Louis XIII's confidante, welcomed Sister Anne de Sainte-Eugénie (Madame de Saint-Ange), one of the twelve nuns exiled from Port-Royal Abbey by the archbishop in August 1664. Marie Mancini, Mazarin's niece, retreated for a time to the Convent of the Visitandines, while Mademoiselle de La Vallière, fleeing the court, took refuge there twice before entering Carmel. In 1669, Jacques-Bénigne Bossuet delivered his famous funeral oration for Henriette-Marie, Queen of England, in Mansart's chapel. The convent later hosted several Stuarts: Henriette of England, the future Duchess of Orleans, was raised here, as was King James II, while the body of Queen Mary of Modena, widow of James II, was buried here in 1718.

In 1686, the Visitation Order purchased the entire seigneury of Chaillot.

The monastery was located between barrière Sainte-Marie, opposite rue Vineuse and rue des Minimes, quai des Bonshommes and rue des Batailles. The latter joined the quay via the ruelle d'Hérivault and the convent via the ruelle Sainte-Marie.

In 1790, the convent housed 22 choir nuns, 9 converses, 2 tourières, a demoiselle agrégée, two sacristans, ten service girls and two carters.

The convent was closed in 1792, and its disused premises were partly destroyed on August 31, 1794, by an explosion at the Grenelle powder plant on the opposite bank of the Seine. The public authorities subsequently cleared the site. In 1813, the site became the subject of the Palace of the King of Rome project.

=== Convent superiors ===
- Hélène Angélique Lhuillier, died in 1655, first superior
- Mademoiselle de La Fayette (in religion Mother Angélique), 1655 to 1665;
- Madame Croiset, 1689–1690;
- Anne Charlotte Bochard de Saron, May 1715 to March 31, 1721;
- Jeanne Françoise Le Vayer, April 1, 1721, to December 31, 1724;
- Louise de Lorge, May 17, 1749, to May 9, 1755; April 1758 to December 23, 1763;
- Marie Damiette, May 10, 1755, to April 1758; December 1763 to May 25, 1770;
- Anne Madeleine Chalmette, May 26, 1770, to May 17, 1776;
- Marie Gabrielle Roslin, May 18, 1776, to May 1782; in 1790;
- Jeanne Adélaïde Pichon, in 1787.

== See also ==
- Château de Chaillot
- Order of the Visitation of Holy Mary
- Louise de La Fayette

== Bibliography ==
- Duvignac-Glessgen, Marie-Ange (2017). "La Visitation de Chaillot au xviie siècle : splendeurs et tribulations d'un monastère dans le siècle". VIIe siècle: Bulletin de la Société d'étude du xviie siècle. ISSN 0012-4273. Archived from the original on 2018-10-17.
- Deswarte-Rosa, Sylvie; Grodecki, Catherine (2005). "Le dernier caprice architectural de Catherine de Médicis: une villa à l'hippodrome sur la colline de Chaillot par Étienne Duperas". Revue de l'Art (153): 21–31. doi:10.3917/rda.150.0021. ISSN 0035-1326.
- Ory, Pascal (2006). Le Palais de Chaillot, Arles, Aristeas / Actes Sud. Les grands témoins de l'architecture. ISBN 2-7427-6392-9.
