= Denis Dupays =

French choir conductor

Denis Dupays is a French choir conductor from Toulouse, specialized in the direction of children choirs.

After singing among the "Petits Chanteurs à la croix potencée", maîtrise de la Cathédrale Saint-Étienne de Toulouse, he pursued musical studies before taking over the direction of this same mastership.

He founded the "Capella Antiqua" in Toulouse before taking up the position of choir conductor at the Angers-Nantes Opéra. In 1989, he was appointed musical director and choir conductor of the Maîtrise de Radio France, a position which he relinquished in 1998 to Toni Ramon. From October 2001 to September 2008, he conducted the boys' choir of the Petits Chanteurs de Nogent-sur-Marne (Les Moineaux du Val-de-Marne).
