= Jacques Cellerier =

French architect (1742–1814)

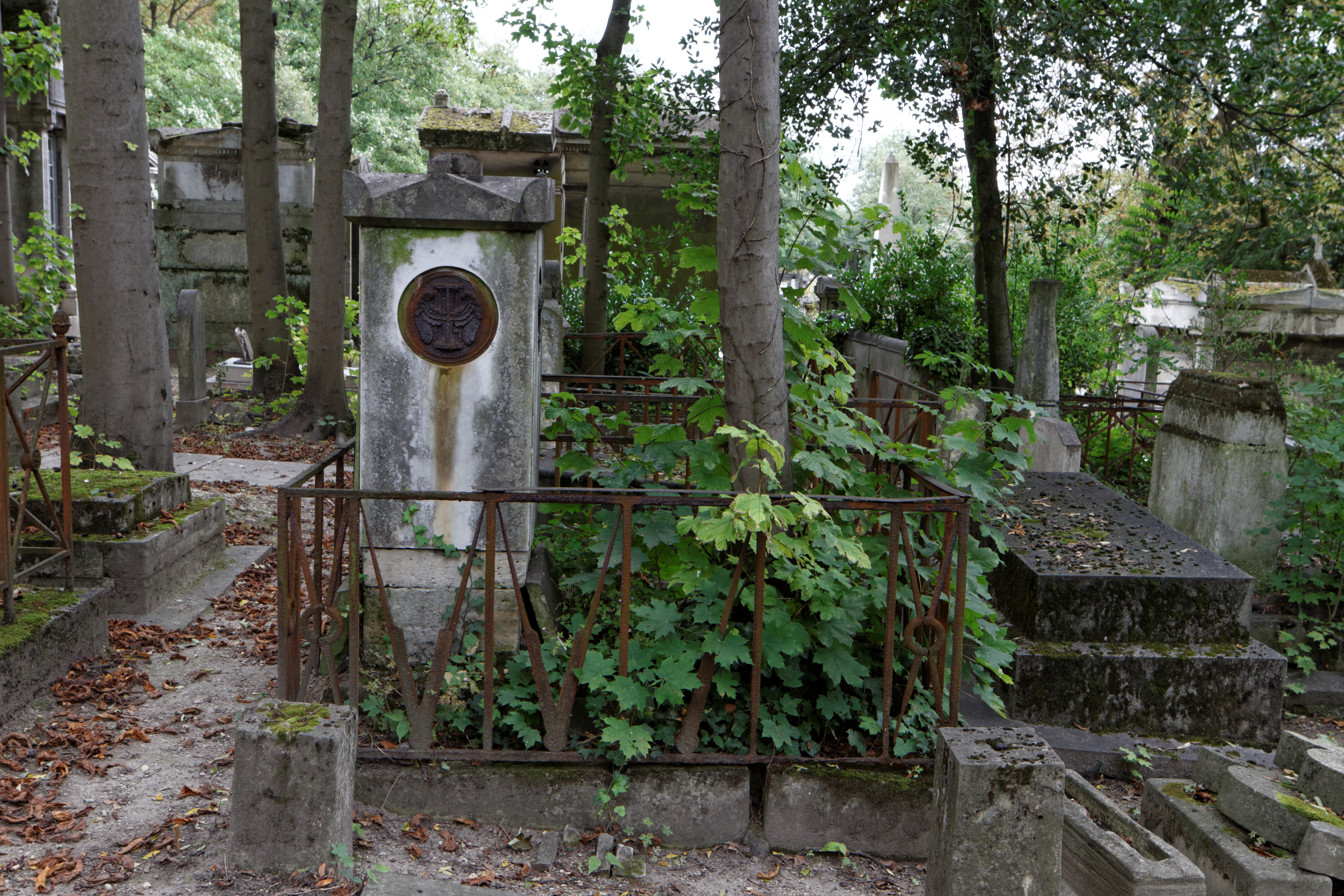
Grave at Père Lachaise cemetery

Jacques Cellerier (1742–1814) was a French architect in the neoclassical style whose buildings can be seen mainly in Paris and Dijon.

== Life ==
Born in Dijon, son of innkeepers, a student of Nicolas Lenoir, to whom he was related, he continued his training at the Académie royale d'architecture. Together with his friend the sculptor Jean-Antoine Houdon, he was pensionnaire du Roi in Rome before being appointed engineer of the Généralité of Paris. His work was mainly focused on private mansions and theatres.

A supporter of the Lumières, he drew the imposing funeral chariot that carried the ashes of his friend Voltaire to the Panthéon in 1791.

In 1790, he made the drawings for the triumphal arch of the Champ-de-Mars for the Fête de la Fédération.

In 1800, on the occasion of the celebration of the Treaty of Mortefontaine between France and the U.S., he proceeded to the restoration of the theatre of the Château de Mortefontaine.

In 1807, Napoleon I charged him with the task of erecting a monument to the glory of his victories over the English and Russians. He was finally replaced for this project by Jean-Antoine Alavoine.

In 1812, Napoleon entrusted him with the project of building a palace of the Archives, the first stone of which was laid on August 15, Saint Napoleon's Day, the Emperor being in the middle of the Russian campaign in front of Smolensk. This palace of the Archives was to be located in the new administrative district designed by the Emperor and was to face the Palace of the King of Rome, at one of the four ends of the Champ de Mars, at the east and along the river Seine. Its realization was to be entrusted to Cellerier. The events of 1815 and the fall of the Empire, however, put an end to this project, which remained unfinished.

In 1813, he used again the gothic style for the first time since the completion of the Cathédrale Sainte-Croix d'Orléans, at the Basilica of Saint-Denis, which was endowed with a richly decorated Gothic chapel. Cellerier also built a neoclassical winter choir.

== Gallery ==
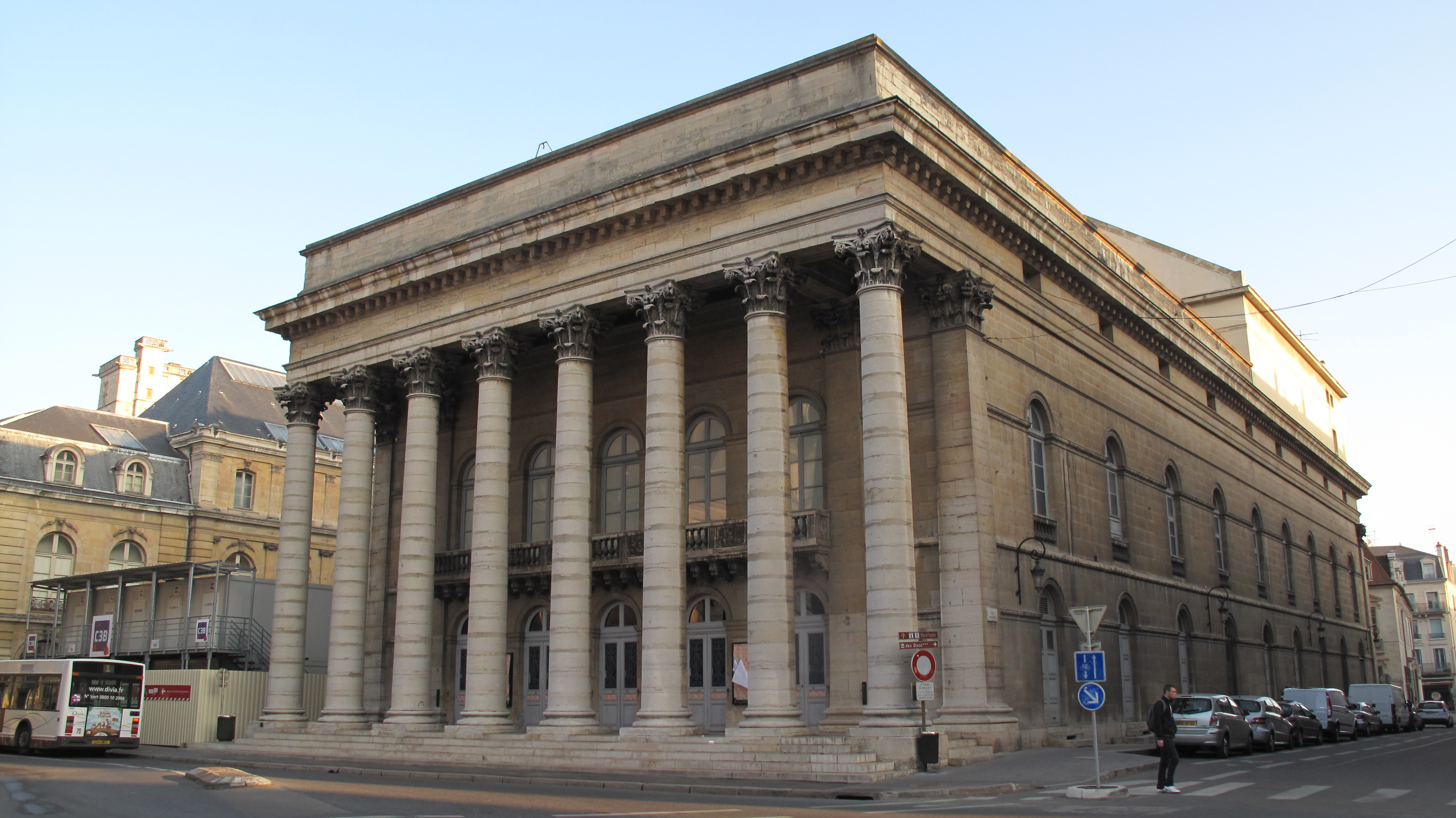
Opera de Dijon.

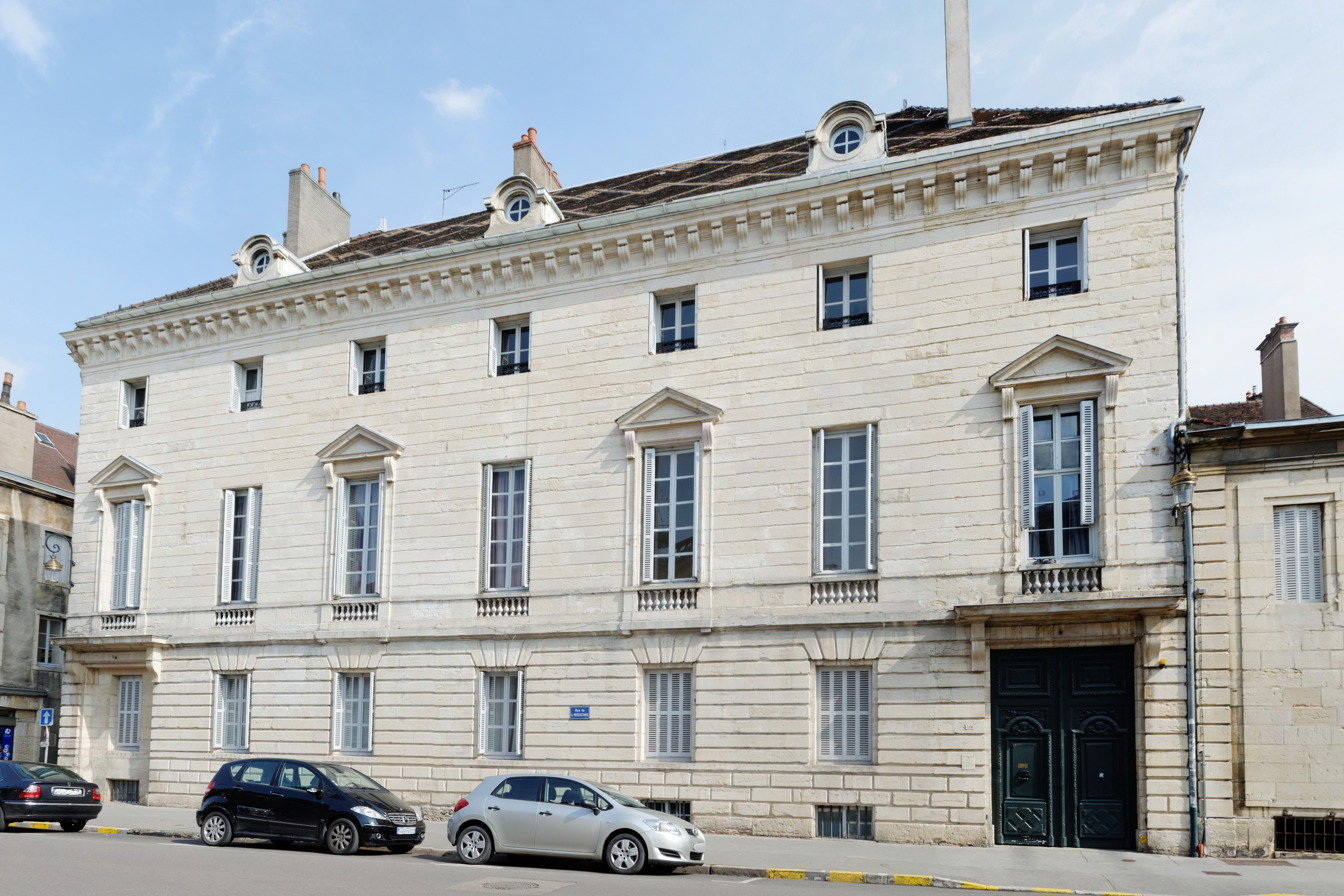
Hôtel Esmonin de Dampierre in Dijon.

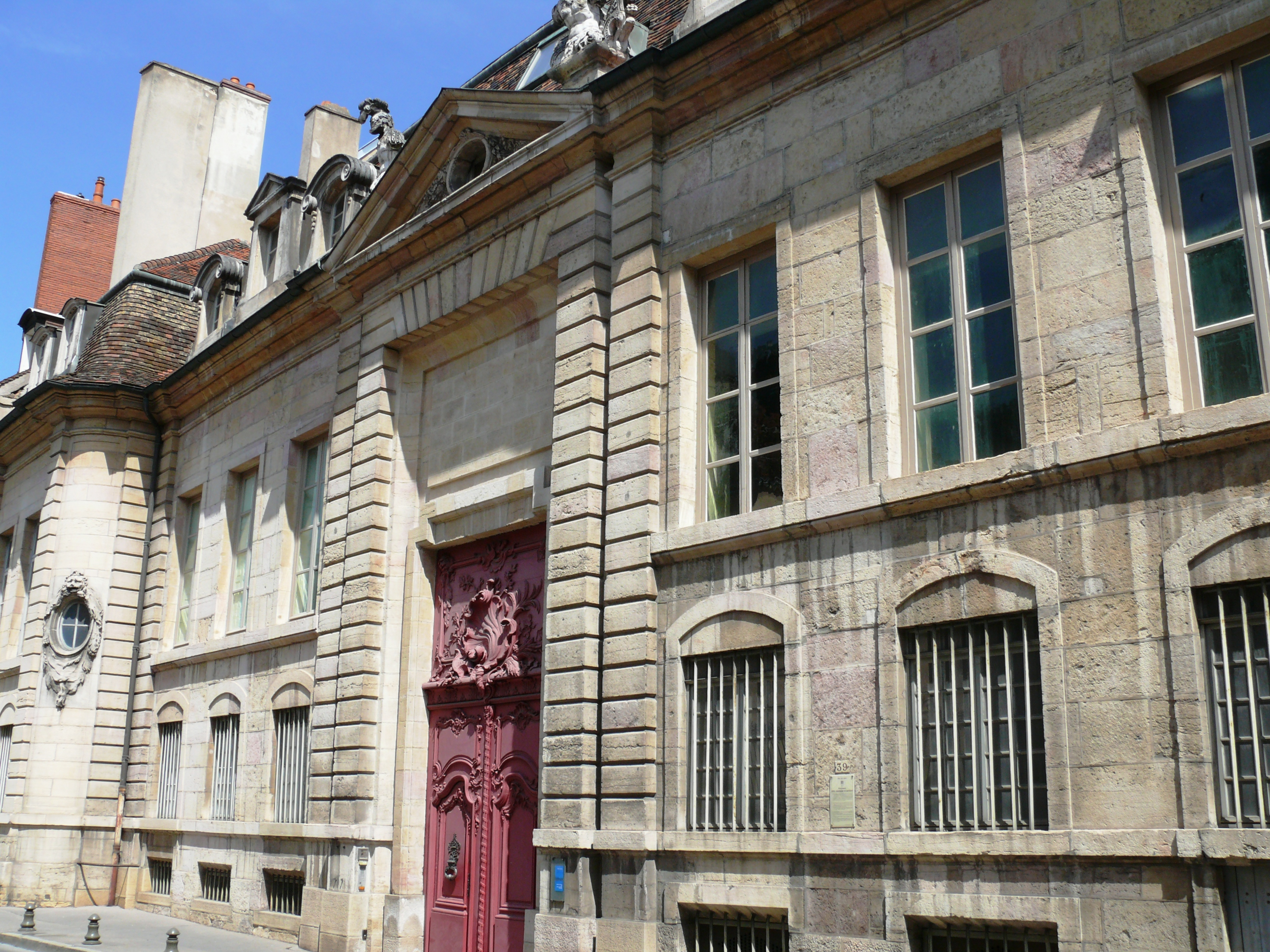
Hôtel Chartraire de Montigny in Dijon.

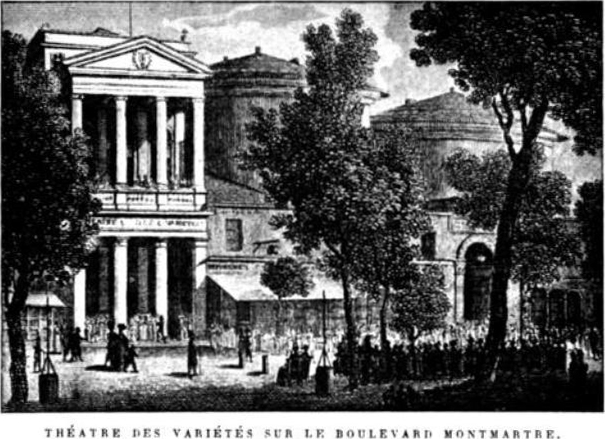
Théâtre des Variétés, circa 1820.

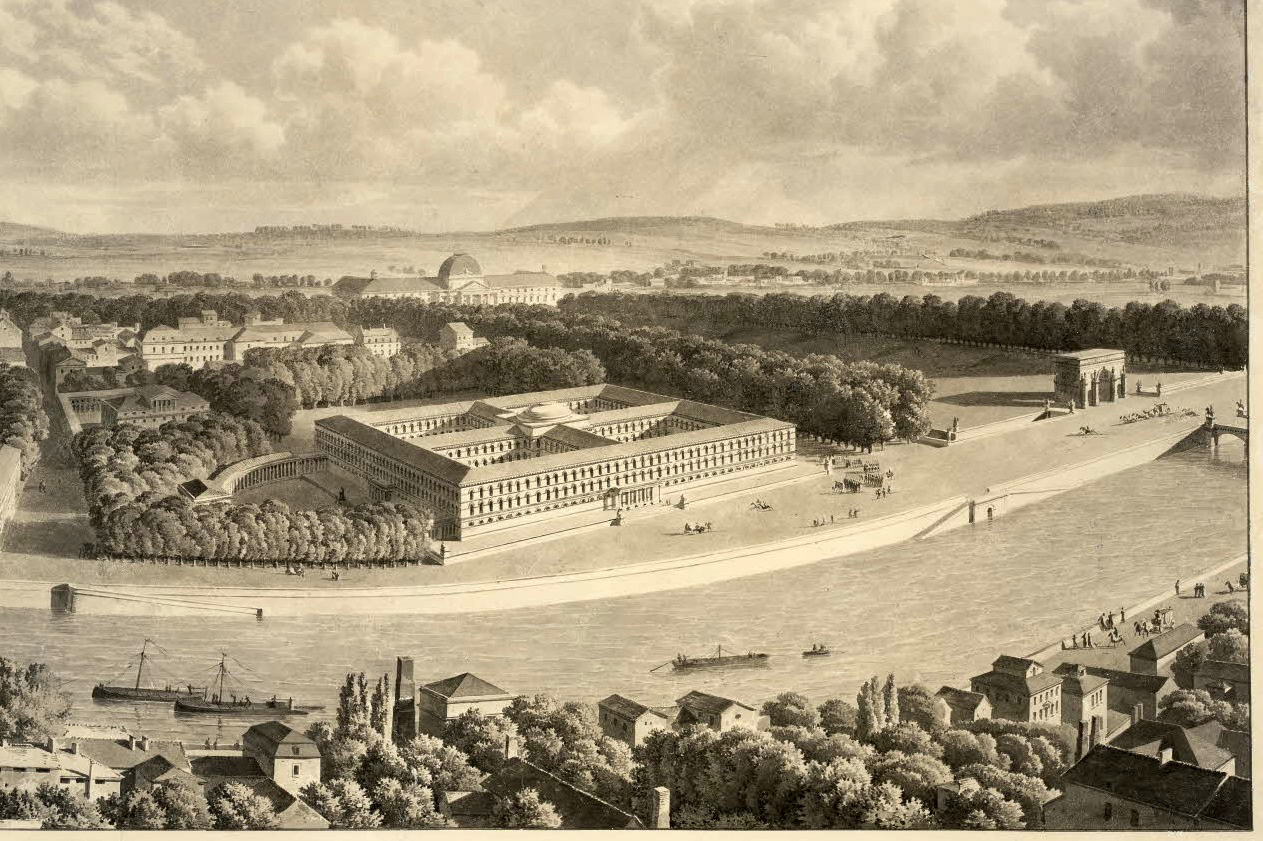
Project for the Palais des Archives in 1812.

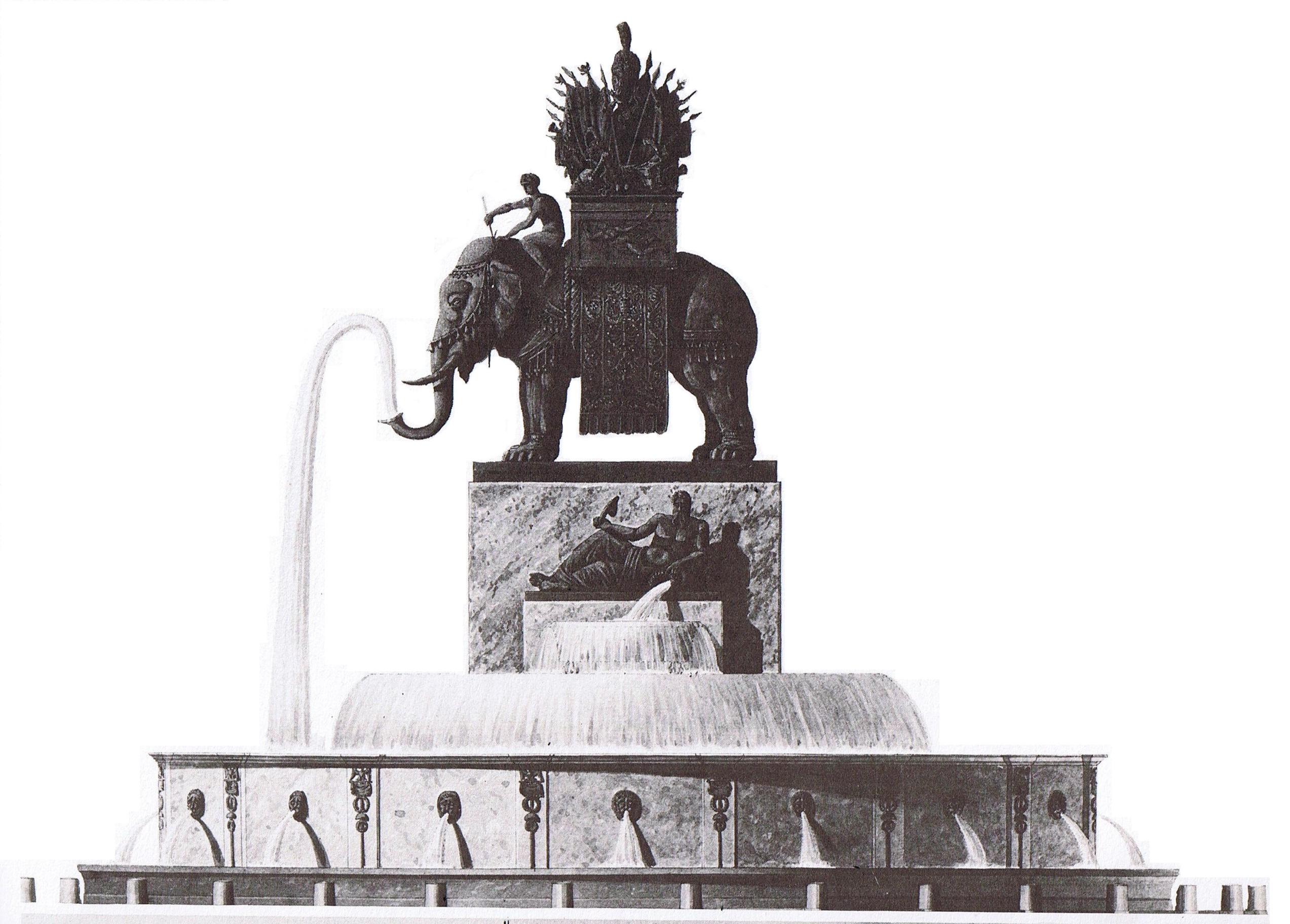
Elephant of the Bastille, initial project of 1809.

== Realisations ==
=== In Paris ===
- Théâtre de l'Ambigu-Comique, boulevard du Temple (1769)
- Hôtel de Verrière, rue Verte-Saint-Honoré (1774)
- Hôtel of Mme d'Épinay, rue de la Chaussée-d'Antin (1776-1777)
- House of Duke of Laval, boulevard du Montparnasse (1777)
- Hôtel built for Cousin de Méricourt at 19 Boulevard Poissonnière. Cellerier lived in.
- La maison du prince de Soubise, rue de l'Arcade (1787-1788)
- Théâtre des Variétés, boulevard Montmartre (1806-1807).
- Restoration of the Porte Saint-Denis (1807)

=== In Dijon ===
- Hôtel Chartraire de Montigny, rue Vannerie (trésorier des États de Bourgogne) (1779).
- Grand Théâtre de Dijon, place du Théâtre. Cellerier only started it because his first stone was laid in 1810, but the work was suspended from 1811 to 1822. They resumed under the direction of the Parisian architect Vallot; the monument was completed in 1828
- Hôtel Esmonin de Dampierre, rue de la Préfecture

=== In Maisons-Alfort ===
- Development of the school known as the Royal Veterinary School of Alfort, currently École nationale vétérinaire d'Alfort.

=== In Compiègne ===
- Former prison (1773-1778)

=== In Tremblay-en-France ===
- Rehabilitation of the Saint-Médard church (1781)

=== In Châtenay-en-France ===
- Saint-Martin Church (1784-1787).

=== In Saint-Germain-en-Laye ===
- Modification of the manhole of Hennemont in Saint-Germain-en-Laye (1787).

== See also ==
- Neoclassical architecture
