= Opéra de Dijon =

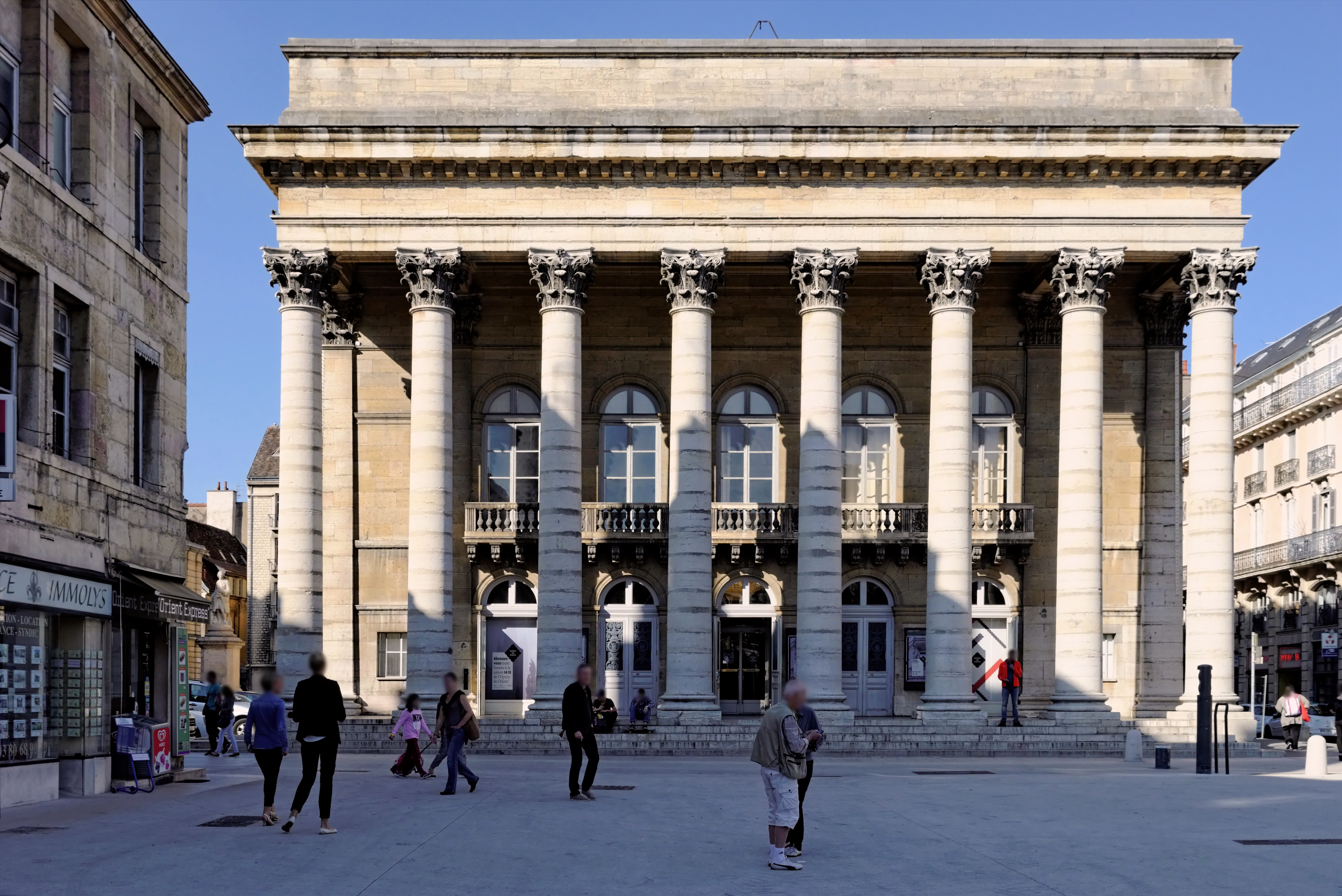
The Grand Théâtre de Dijon, built in 1828 and one of Opéra de Dijon's two main performance venues

The Opéra de Dijon is an opera company and arts organization in Dijon, France. It administers both the Grand Théâtre de Dijon and the Auditorium de Dijon which are its main performance venues. In addition to operas, the organization also stages ballets and classical music concerts.

== History ==
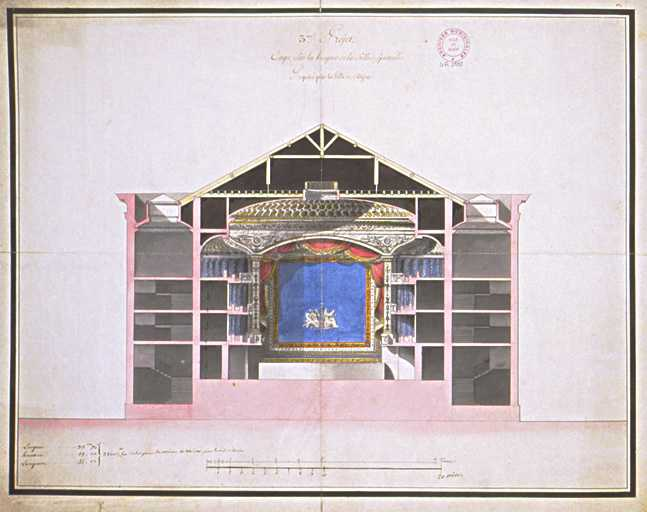
Jacques Cellerier's 1787 plan for Dijon's first purpose-built theatre and opera house

Opera had been performed in Dijon by travelling opera troupes from the 17th century, although the city did not have its own theatre. The performances were given in privately owned and often ramshackle gambling dens and jeu de paume courts known as tripots. In 1717, the city acquired one of them (the tripot des Barres) with the intention of creating a municipal performing venue. The Salle de Comédie, as it was called by 1743, remained Dijon's main theatrical venue until 1828, with seating only installed in 1817. Prior to that, the audience had watched the performances standing up.

The Dijon architect Jacques Cellerier first proposed the construction of a new theatre to replace the Salle de Comédie in 1787. The demolition of the Sainte-Chapelle church and its cloister in 1802 freed up land in the city centre and plans began in earnest for a purpose-built municipal theatre and opera house. Cellerier formally submitted his plans in 1803. The first stone was laid in 1810, but construction was halted between 1814 and 1823. The building was finally completed in 1828 and inaugurated as the Grand Théâtre de Dijon.

The Grand Théâtre (also referred to in the past as the "Opéra de Dijon") remained the city's only opera house until the end of the 20th century. Its last two General Directors were Guy Grinda (1966 to 1978) and Pierre Filippi (1978 to 2002). A second and larger municipal auditorium and concert hall was constructed in 1998, and in 2001 a new organization called Duo Dijon was set up to administer both the Grand Théâtre and the Auditorium and to become a production company in its own right rather than relying on touring productions and performers. Its first General Director was Olivier Desbordes who held the post until 2007. In 2008, under the directorship Laurent Joyeux, the organization's name was officially changed to Opéra de Dijon.

== Performance venues ==
Grand Théâtre de Dijon

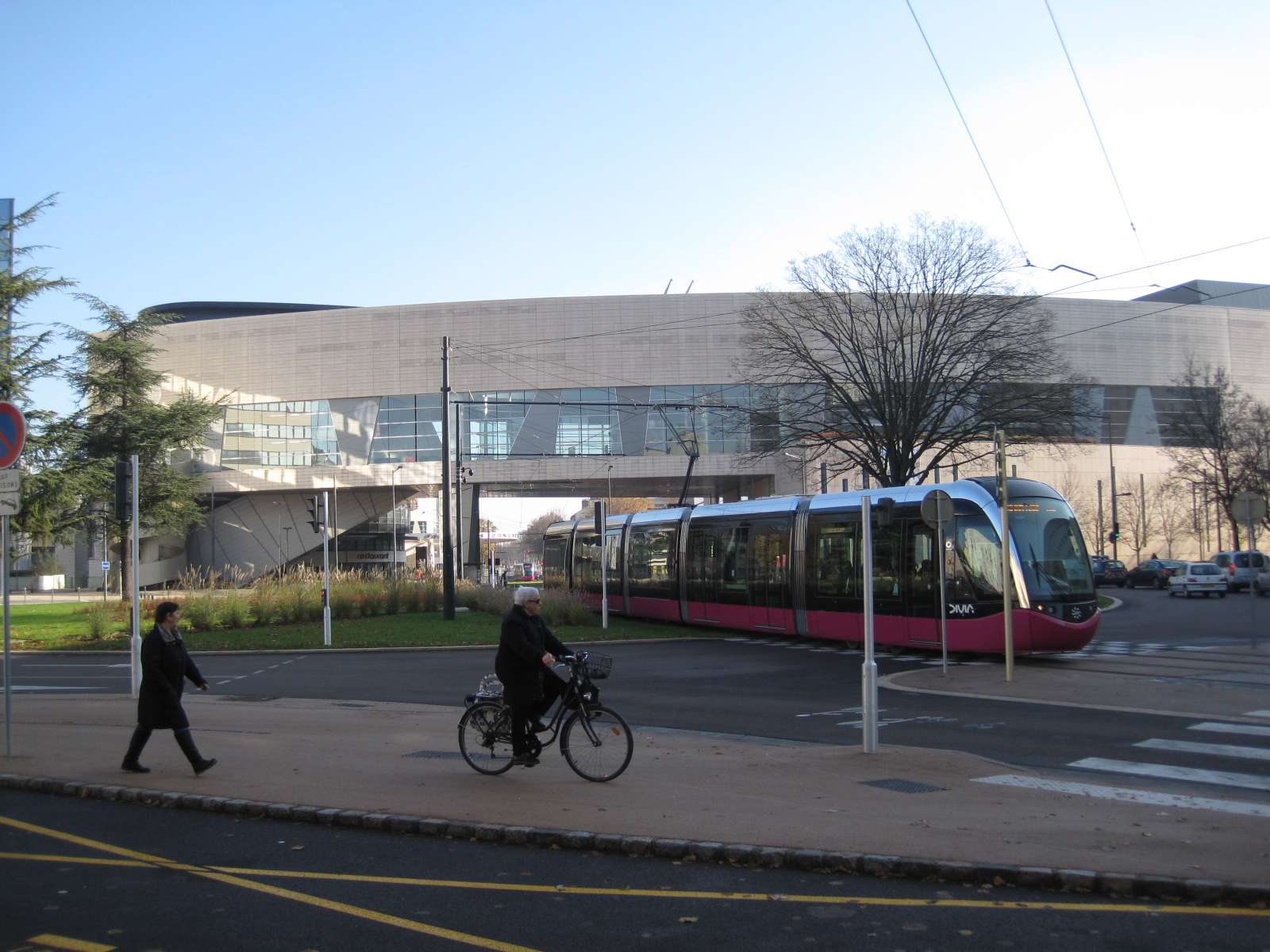
The Auditorium de Dijon, built in 1998

The Grand Théâtre de Dijon is located at the Place du Théâtre. It was inaugurated on 4 November 1828 with the play Les deguisements, ou une folie des grands hommes, especially written for the occasion by the Dijon-born poet Charles Brifaut. The theatre was designed by Jacques Cellerier (1742–1814) and Simon Vallot (1774–1850) in the Neo-classical style with an interior modelled after of those of Italian opera houses. In 1975 its exterior was declared a monument historique of France. The theatre's last major restoration was in 2005, and it now has a seating capacity of 692.

Auditorium de Dijon

Planning for the construction of the Auditorium, a larger and more modern theatre and concert hall for the city, was begun by the Dijon City Council in 1988. It was designed by a consortium of architectural firms (Arquitectonica of Miami, Florida and Bougeault–Walgenwitz of Dijon with acoustics engineering by Artec) and was officially opened on 20 June 1998. The Orchestre National de France conducted by Charles Dutoit performed the inaugural concert in November of that year. Located at the Place Jean Bouhey, the triangular-shaped building, reminiscent of a grand piano, has two large glass-walled foyers and a main auditorium on four levels with a seating capacity of 1611. The exterior is covered in beige Chassagne limestone from local quarries. More suited to large-scale productions than the Grand Théâtre, the Auditorium was the venue for Opéra de Dijon's 2013 production of Wagner's four-opera Ring Cycle, the first complete production in France in 30 years.

== Opera repertory ==
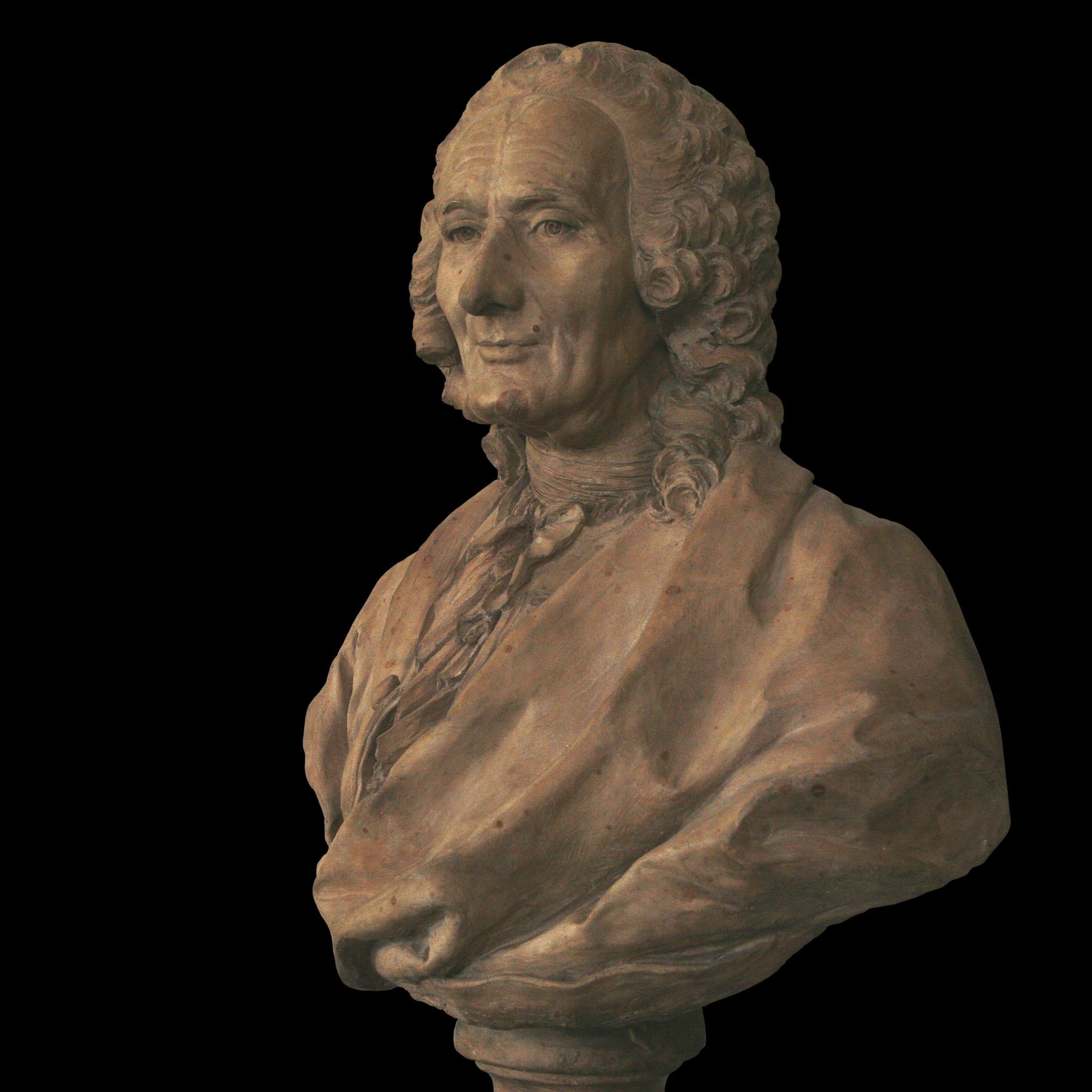
Bust of the Dijon-born composer Jean-Philippe Rameau by Caffieri. Opéra de Dijon staged a rare revival of his opera Dardanus in 2009.

The company's programming includes both the standard operatic repertory and rarely performed works, the latter sometimes given in concert version. Since 2007, its annual programming has been themed to include works by composers associated with a particular country. Its 2014/2015 season focused on Czechoslovakia with performances of Káťa Kabanová, Der Kaiser von Atlantis, Brundibár, and Janáček's song cycle The Diary of One Who Disappeared. The 250th anniversary of the death of Jean-Philippe Rameau, who was born in Dijon, was marked with productions of his Castor et Pollux and a double bill of his opéra-ballets Daphnis et Eglé and La Naissance d’Osiris.

In the 2013/2014 season, Opéra de Dijon presented La Pellegrina, une fête florentine. Girolamo Bargagli's play La pellegrina is primarily known for its six musical intermedi by the most famous Florentine composers of the day, including Giulio Caccini, Cristofano Malvezzi, Luca Marenzio, and Jacopo Peri. It was first performed in 1589 to celebrate the marriage of Ferdinando de' Medici and Christina of Lorraine. For the Dijon production the company commissioned a new libretto by Rémi Cassaigne to replace the text of Bargagli's play during which the intermedi were performed. Other relatively rarely performed works which the company has presented include Rameau's Dardanus (2009), Gounod's Le médecin malgré lui (2009), Hindemith's Neues vom Tage (2009), Busoni's Turandot (2011), and Mysliveček's L'Olimpiade (2013).

== Organization ==
As of 2015, Opéra de Dijon's General and Artistic Director is Laurent Joyeux who has held the post since 2007. The company has its own chorus directed by the pianist and conductor Mihály Menelaos Zeke, but no longer has its own orchestra. In 2009 the Opéra de Dijon orchestra was transferred to the Camerata de Bourgogne which then merged with Orchestre Dijon to form the regional orchestra, Orchestre Dijon Bourgogne (or ODB). The ODB is used for most of the company's larger-scale opera productions. The company's other associated orchestras include the Southwest German Radio Symphony Orchestra, the Chamber Orchestra of Europe, and the Baroque ensemble Le Concert d'Astrée led by Emmanuelle Haïm.

The bulk of Opéra de Dijon's funding comes from a subsidy by the City of Dijon. In 2013 this amounted to €7 million (on an overall annual budget of about €10.5 million). The remainder of its funding is met by corporate and private sponsors and ticket sales. Oversight of the organization, which is a member of Réunion des Opéras de France, is provided by an 18-member administrative council.
