= Pierre Jeannin =

French politician (1542–1623)

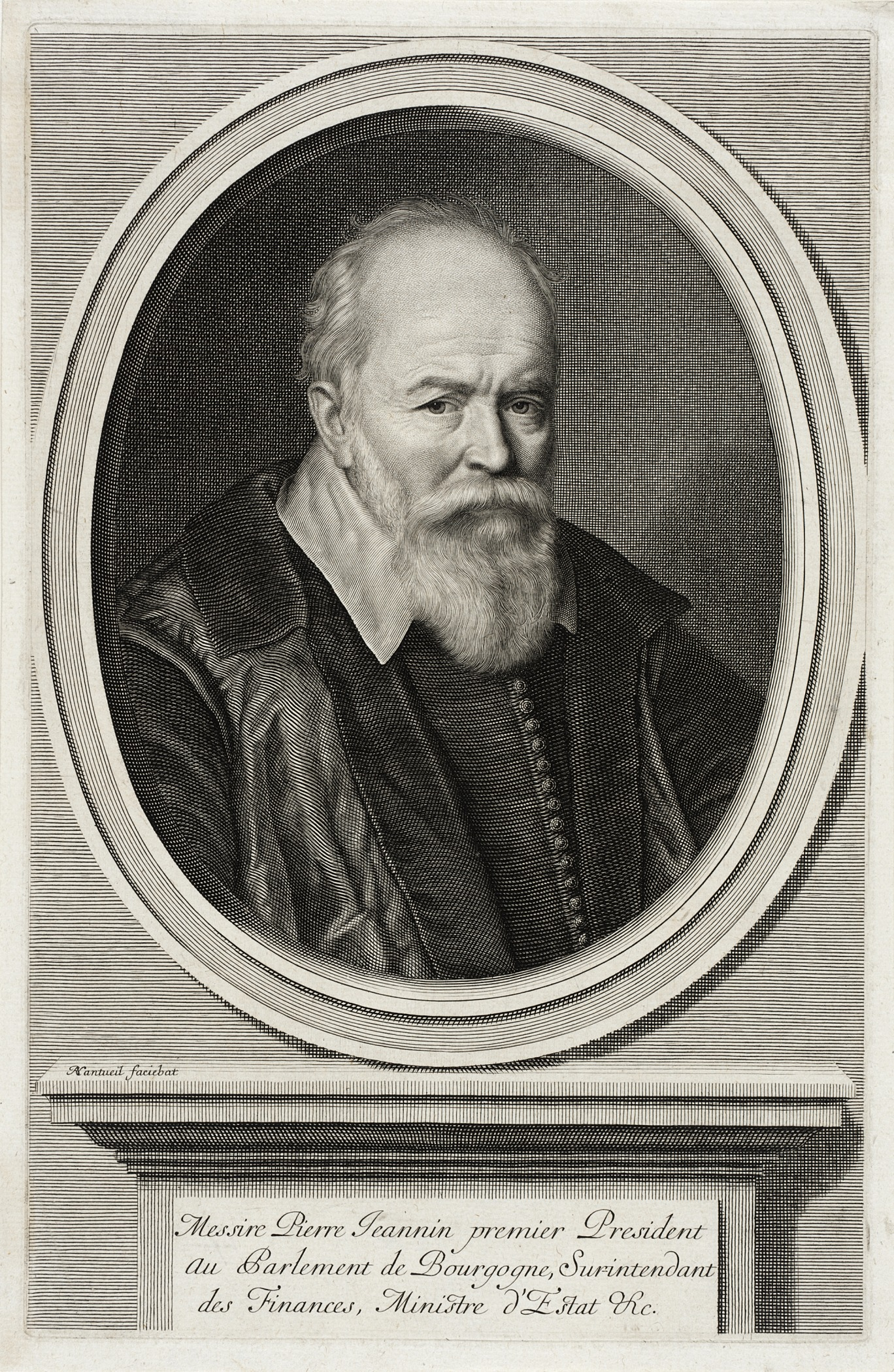
- Pierre Jeannin
- Born: Pierre Jamin; 1542; Autun, France
- Died: 22 March 1623 (aged 80–81); Chaillot, Paris, France
- Occupation: Avocat (Lawyer)

Pierre Jeannin (1542–1623) was a French statesman, otherwise known as a surintendant des finances (Finance Superintendent). In 1573 he married Anne Gueniot and had one daughter, Charlotte Jeannin.

== Career ==
He was born at Autun. A pupil of the great jurist Jacques Cujas at Bourges, he was an advocate at Dijon by 1569 and became councillor and then president of the parlement of Burgundy. He unsuccessfully opposed the massacre of St Bartholomew in his province. As councillor to Charles of Lorraine, Duke of Mayenne, he sought to reconcile him with King Henry IV of France.

After the victory of Fontaine-Française (1595), Henry took Jeannin into his council and in 1602 named him intendant of finances. He took part in the principal events of the reign, negotiated the Treaty of Lyon with Charles Emmanuel I, Duke of Savoy, and the defensive alliance between France and the United Netherlands in 1608. As Superintendent of Finances under King Louis XIII, be tried to establish harmony between the king and the queen mother, Marie de' Medici.
