= Maîtrise de la Cathédrale Saint-Étienne de Toulouse =

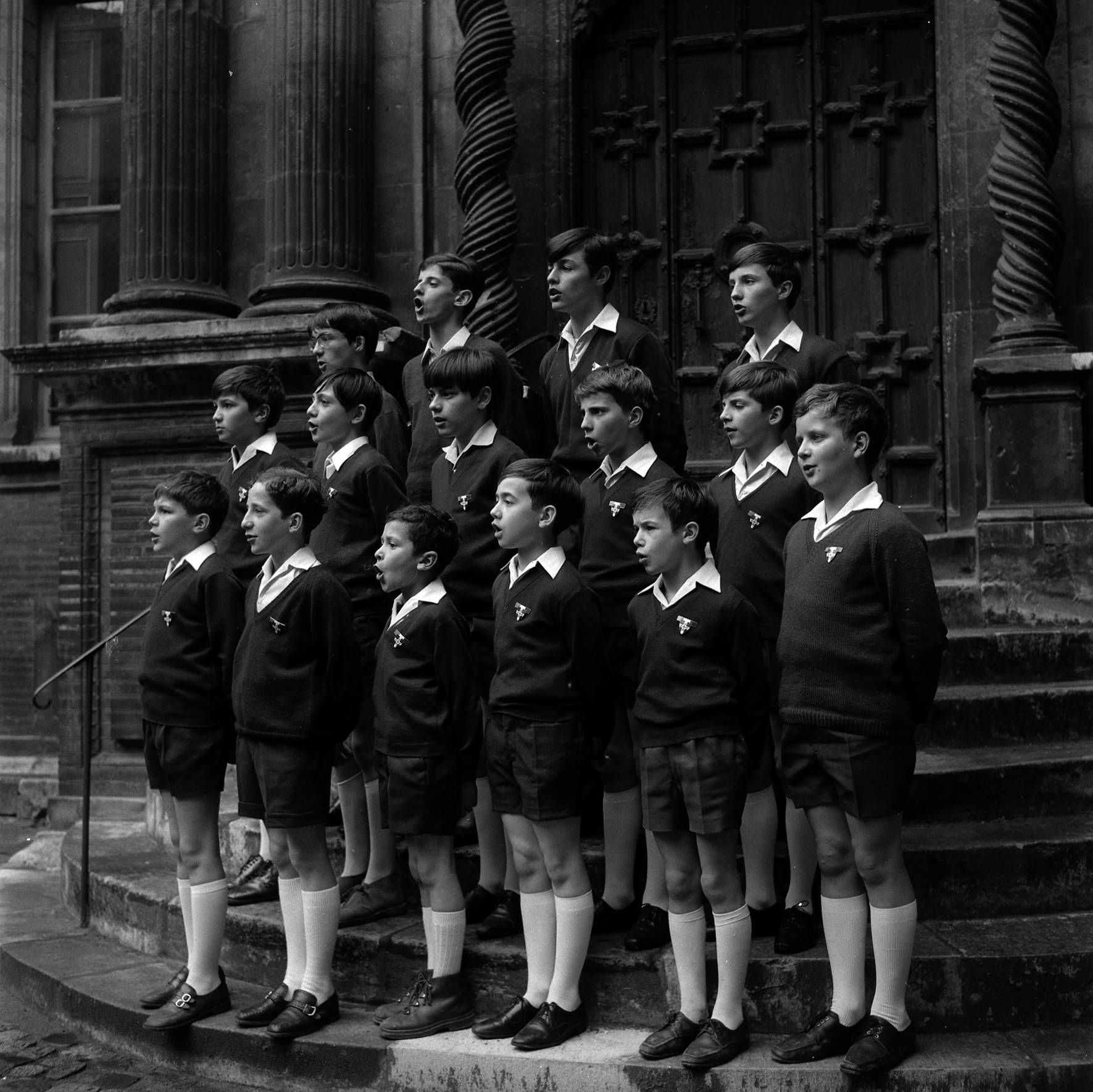
The choir in an archival photo from 1968

The Maîtrise de la Cathédrale Saint-Étienne de Toulouse is a boys choir of several centuries of existence refounded in 1936 in Toulouse by George Rey. They have also been known by the name of Petits Chanteurs à la Croix Potencée. Today, the Maîtrise de la Cathédrale is composed by a boys choir (ages 8 to 25), a girls choir and more than eight children choirs.

== List of conductors since 1936 ==
- Abbé Georges Rey (1936–1976)
- Denis Dupays (1977–1979)
- Michel Rivière des Borderies (1980–1987)
- Yves Lequin (1987–1989)
- François Terrieux (1989–1990)
- David Godfroid (1990–1998)
- Wilfried Busaall (1999–2003)
- Bertrand Ollé (2003–2004)
- Victoria Digon (2004–2007)
- Peggy Pehau (2007–2009)
- Luciano Bibiloni (depuis 2009)
