= Réunion des Opéras de France =

Organization

The Réunion des Opéras de France, commonly known as the ROF, is the professional association of opera companies in France. It provides information resources for the opera sector and the public, supports its member companies through meetings, and promotes the art form.

The association was founded in 1964 as the Réunion des Théâtres Lyriques Municipaux de France (RTLMF), changed its name to the Réunion des Théâtre Lyriques de France (RTLF) in 1991, finally getting its current name of the Réunion des Opéras de France (ROF) in 2003.

== List of members ==
As of March 2015, the ROF membership comprised 26 opera houses, lyric festivals and theatres:

- Angers-Nantes Opéra
- Opéra Grand Avignon (fr)
- Opéra National de Bordeaux
- Théâtre de Caen (fr)
- Opéra de Dijon
- Opéra de Lille
- Opéra de Limoges (fr)
- Opéra National de Lyon
- Opéra de Marseille
- Opéra de Massy (fr)
- Opéra-Théâtre de Metz Métropole
- Opéra national de Montpellier Languedoc-Roussillon
- Opéra national de Lorraine
- Opéra de Nice
- Chorégies d'Orange
- Opéra national de Paris
- Théâtre national de l'Opéra Comique
- Opéra de Reims (fr)
- Opéra de Rennes (fr)
- Opéra de Rouen Haute-Normandie (fr)
- Opéra Théâtre de Saint-Étienne (fr)
- Opéra national du Rhin
- Opéra Toulon Provence Méditerranée
- Théâtre du Capitole de Toulouse
- Opéra de Tours (fr)
- Opéra Royal de Versailles

== Sources ==
- Réunion des Opéras de France website
