= Saint-Pierre-de-Chaillot =

Church of Saint-Pierre de Chaillot
- Église Saint-Pierre de Chaillot
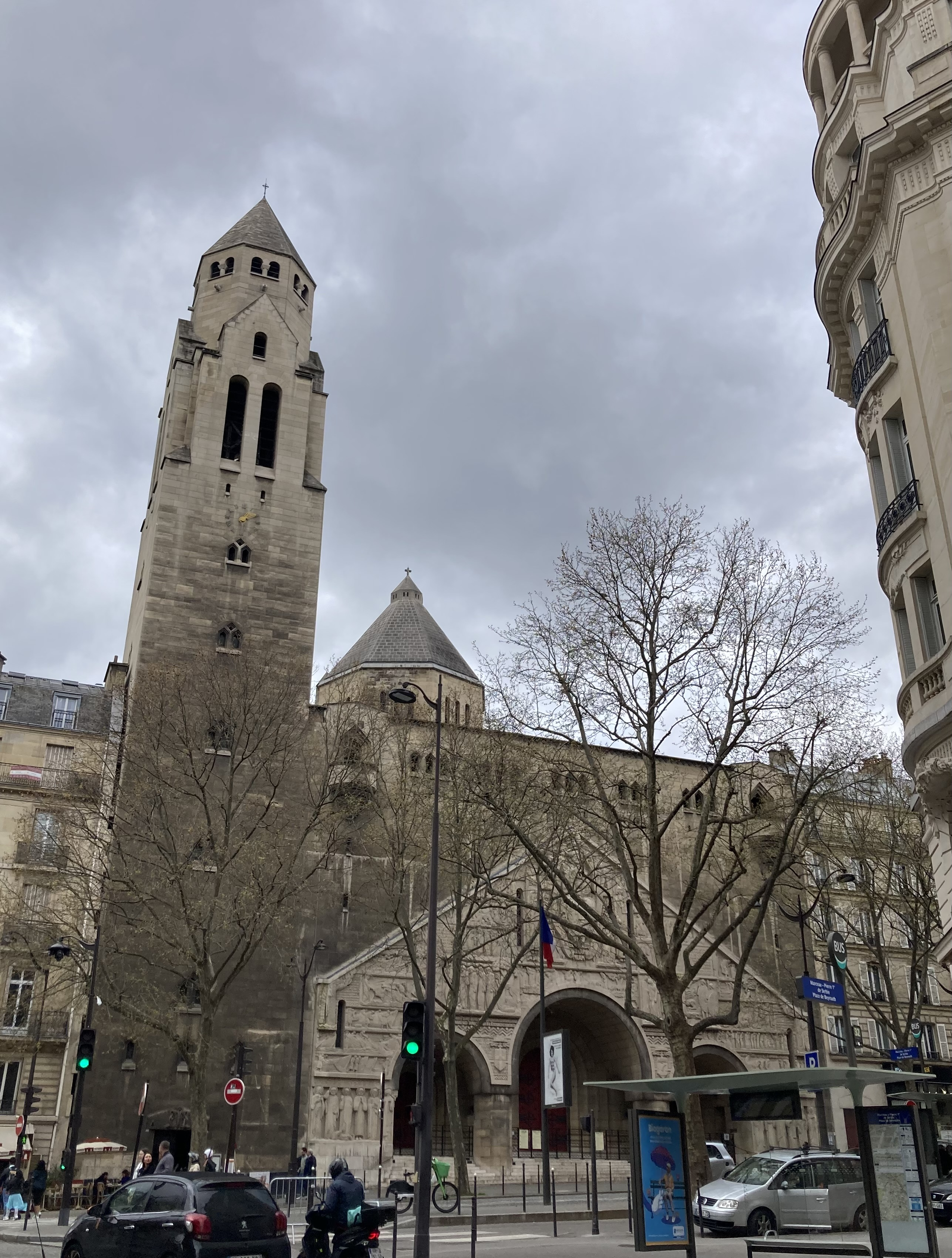
- Church of Saint-Pierre de Chaillot
- 48.8677°N 2.2985°E
- Location: 16th arrondissement of Paris
- Country: France
- Denomination: Roman Catholic Church
- Website: eglise-chaillot.com

Saint-Pierre de Chaillot (French pronunciation: [sɛ̃.pjɛʁ də ʃa.jo]) is a Roman Catholic parish church in the Chaillot neighborhood of the 16th arrondissement of Paris, at 31, avenue Marceau. It is constructed in the "Romano-Byzantine" style.

== History ==
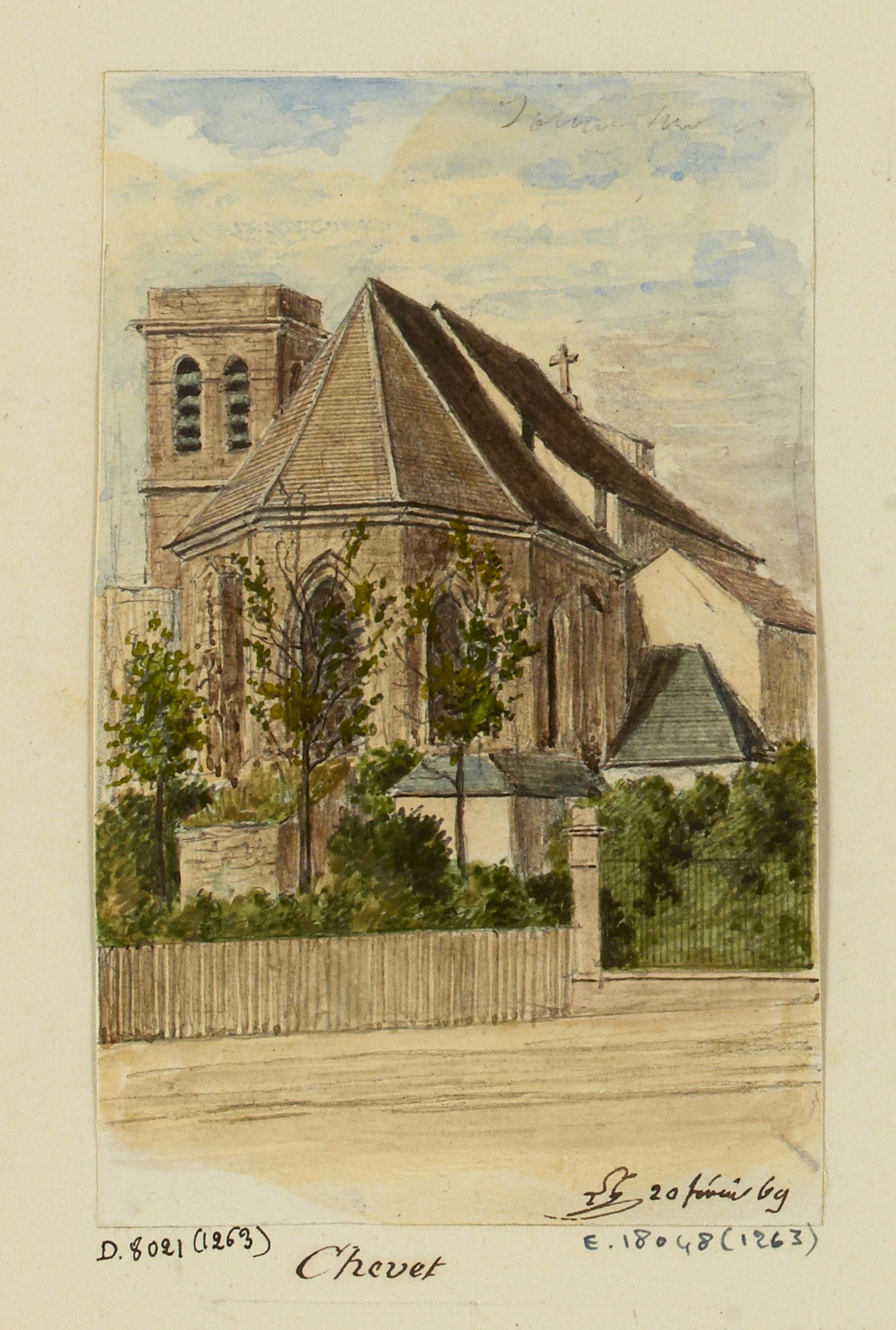
Old church (1869)

The first church of Saint-Pierre de Chaillot dates back to the 11th century; it was the first church in Paris dedicated to Saint Peter. A second church was built in the 17th century. This church was entered from rue de Chaillot, and was a simple chapel with a brick facade opening onto avenue Marceau. The city of Paris today owns the church, because it was built on city property.

The former church hosted the funerals of Guy de Maupassant on 8 July 1893 and of Marcel Proust on 21 November 1922. All that remains of the old church is a statue of the Virgin Mary, the 'Vierge de Chaillot'.

The new church was part of a much large project called "Chantiers du Cardinal", which constructed many new churches in the years after World War I, to accommodate the enormous increase in the population of Paris.

The present building was designed by the architect Émile Bois (1875–1960). Construction begain in 1933 and was completed in 1938. It was built of reinforced concrete, with stone on the outside. It was the second largest of the news concrete Paris churches, next only to the enormous Saint-Esprit, Paris. Henri Bouchard was the sculptor and Nicholas Untersteller the painter of the interior frescoes. Pierre Seguin sculpted the column capitals. The Maumejan brothers did the stained glass windows and also made the mosaic behind the altar in the crypt. Pierre Ducos de la Haille did the ceiling frescoes in the dome of the sanctuary as well as the frescoes in the crypt consisting of Christ, the Holy Spirit, and Saint Peter.

The parish of the church includes the office of the Apostolic Nuncio, the permanent representative of the Holy See to France. As a consequence, Archbishop Angelo Roncalli, the future Pope John XXIII, was a frequent visitor to the church.

The church was inscribed as an historic monument of France on 3 November 2016.

== Exterior ==
The bell tower

The facade and portal

The architecture of the church, like many other churches of the 1930s, was influenced by Byzantine architecture and Romanesque architecture, but the use of more modern materials such as reinforced concrete gave the architect more freedom. It is the second-largest of the concrete churches in Paris, The building has three elements; the bell tower, 65 meters high, which dominates the other structures;

The building has three elements; the bell tower on Avenue Moarceau, 65 meters high, which dominates the other structures; the lower church, in the form of a Greek cross, built like a crypt and, hidden below the other portions of the church; and the upper church, with a central bell tower. The facade of the church faces onto the avenue. The lower church covers an area of 820 square meters, while the upper church covers 1960 square meters.

== Interior ==
The Choir -Sculpture of the Crucifixion by Bouchard

The most dramatic features of the nave include are the four grand frescoes by Nicholas Untersteller (1900–1967 painted on the arches and the pillars, made in a very original fashion. He began by engraving directly the contours of the design onto the concrete, then created the paintings while still leaving some of the concrete visible, permitting the art to harmonise with the architecture.

The theme of the frescoes is the Christian Credo, illustrated by events and symbols in the spiritual life: "There is One Faith", illustrated by images of the sacraments and liturgical ceremonies; "It is Holy"; illustrated by the beatitudes and virtues, and the lives of the Saints; "It is Catholic"; its universality illustrated by the great evangelists; "It is Apostolic"; illustrated by images of the Apostles, the Evangelists, and the Councils.

== The Crypt ==
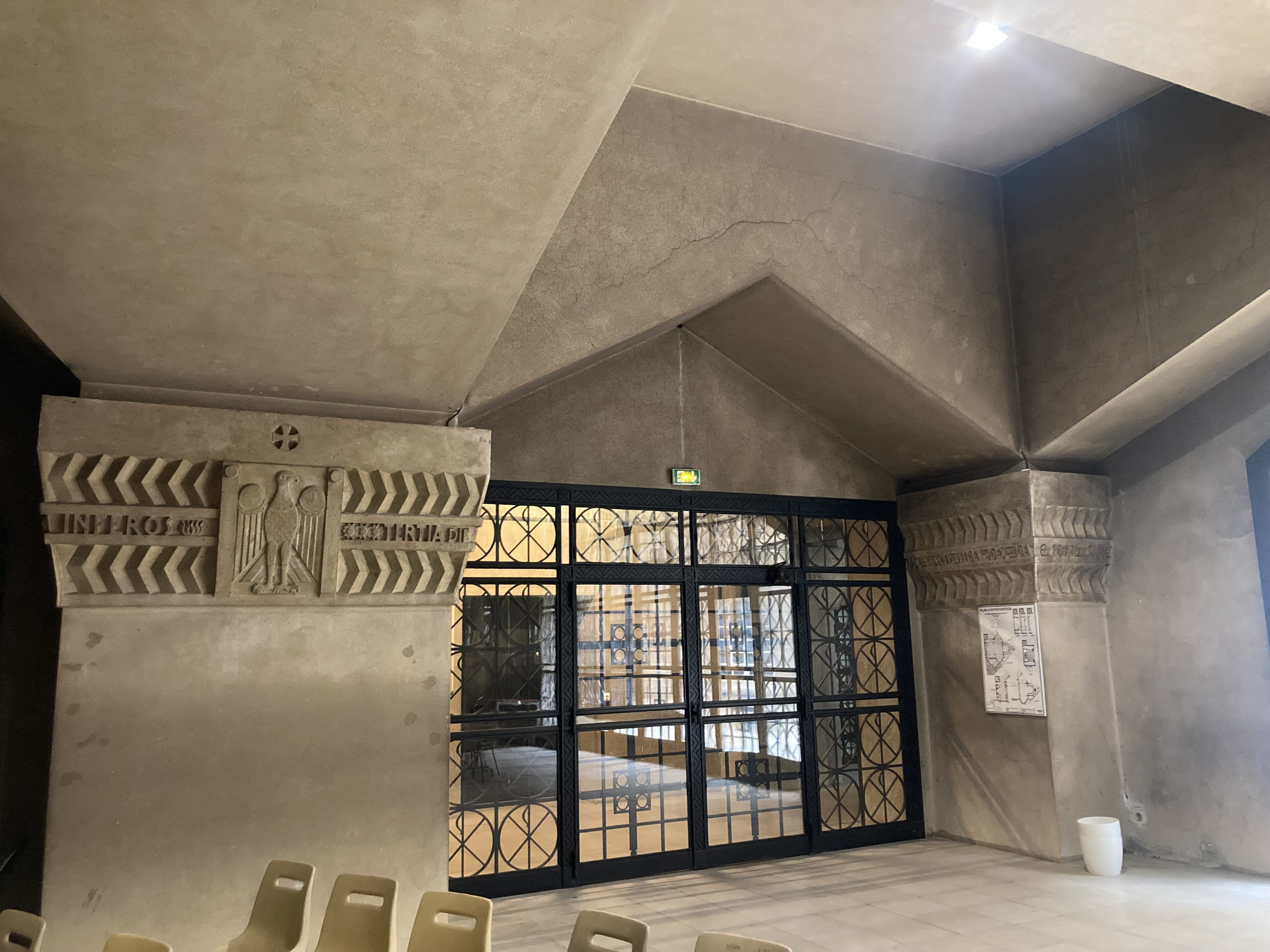
Entrance to the crypt

== Cupolas and Stained Glass ==
The church has two octagonal cupolas, decorated on the interior with frescoes.

The stained glass windows are the work of the brothers Maumejean. They are not entirely realistic but not entirely abstract; angels, animals and figures can be found in them by looking closely. The windows are tall but very narrow, and they are densely coloured. As a result, the interior of the church is exceptionally dark.

Stained glass on nave side aisle

== The Organs ==
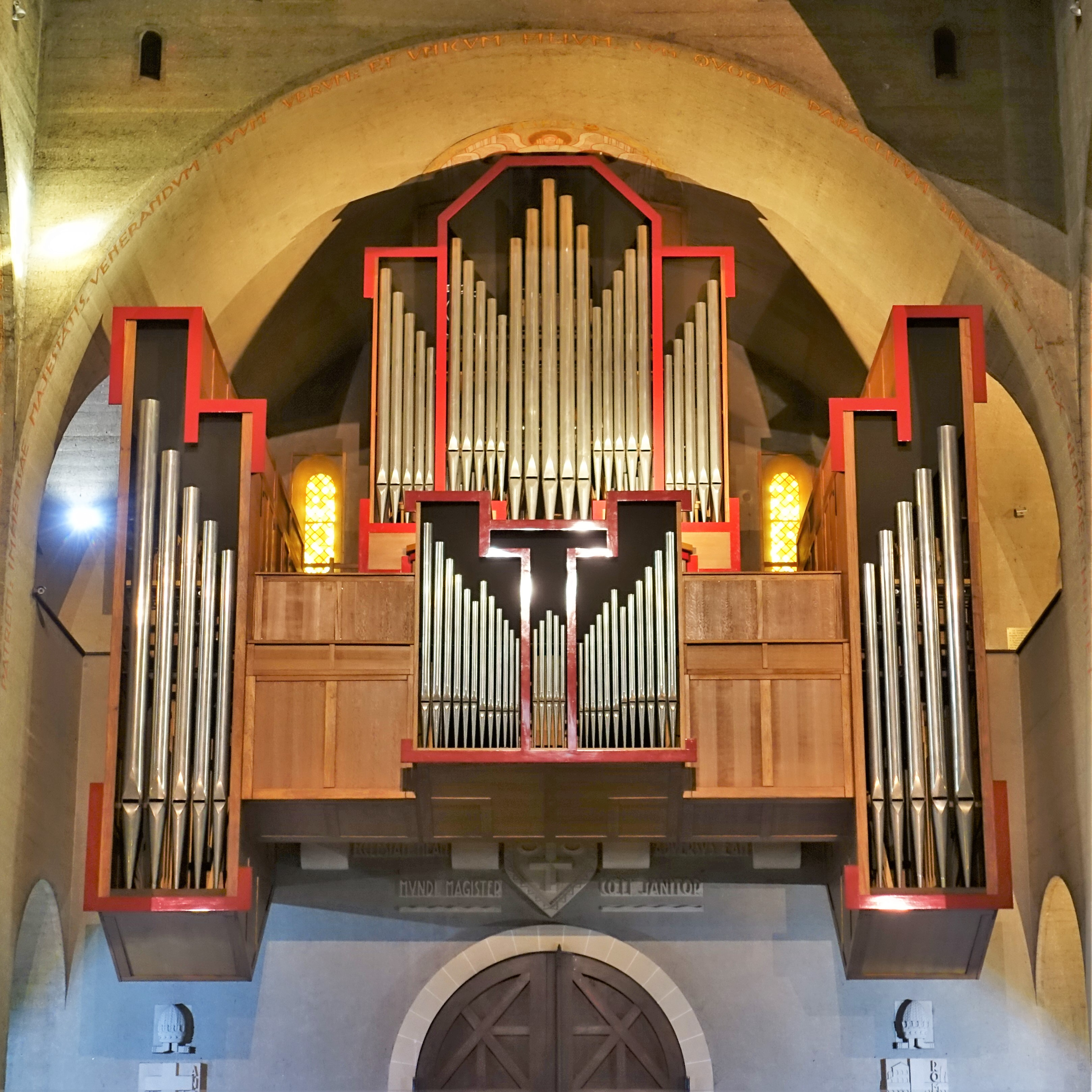
The main organ by Birouste (1993)

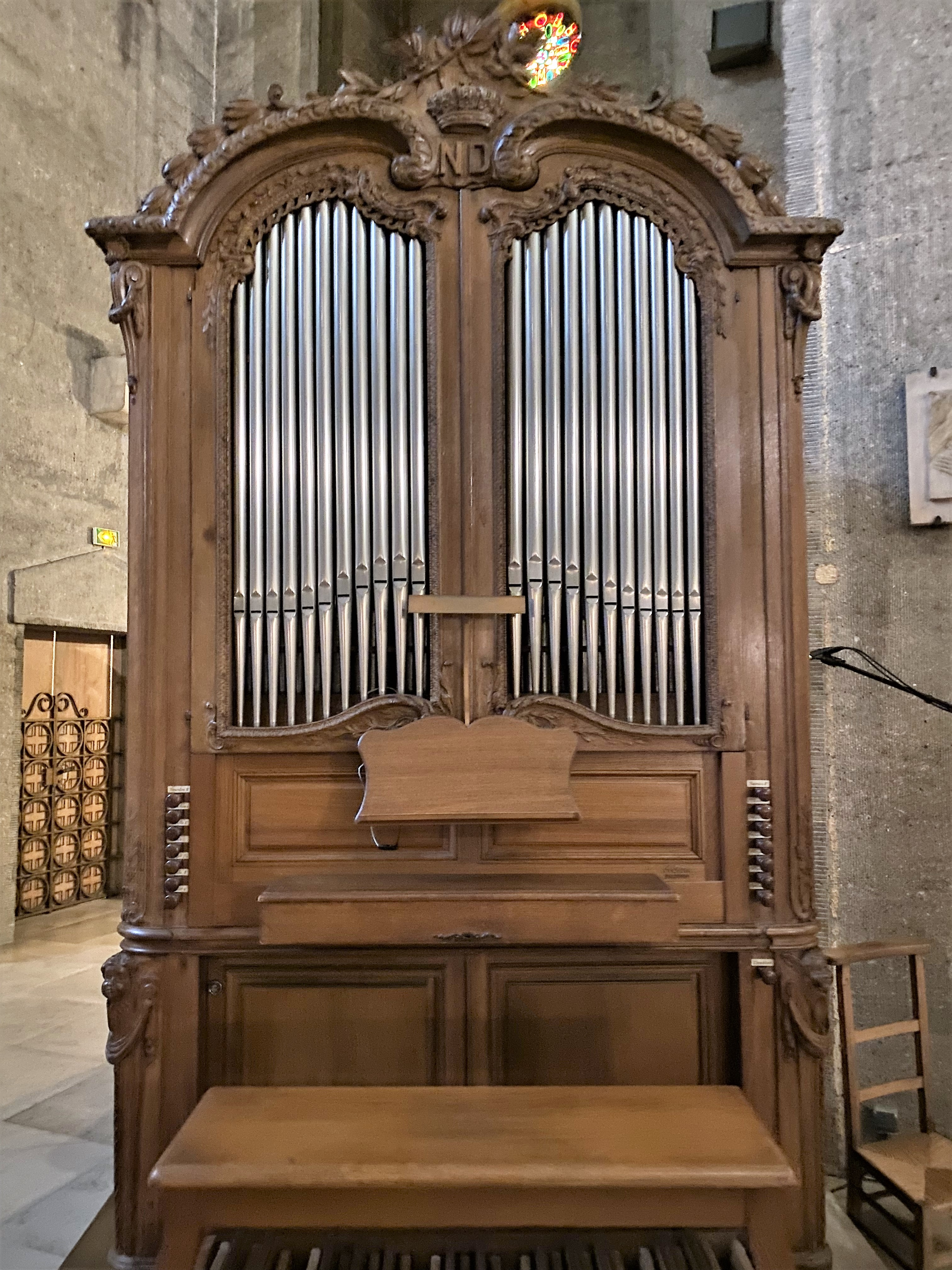
The choir organ

The main organ is a modern instrument, made by the workshop of Birouste in 1993. A smaller instrument is placed in the choir.

== Bibliography ==
- Bertrand Lemoine and Lemoine Rivoirard, L'Architecture des années 30, Paris, éditions La Manufacture, 1987, 252 p. (ISBN 2737700027)
- André Deveche, L'église Saint-Pierre-de-Chaillot de Paris, Paris, édition Sides, coll. « Les églises de Paris », 1990
