= Angers-Nantes Opéra =

French opera company

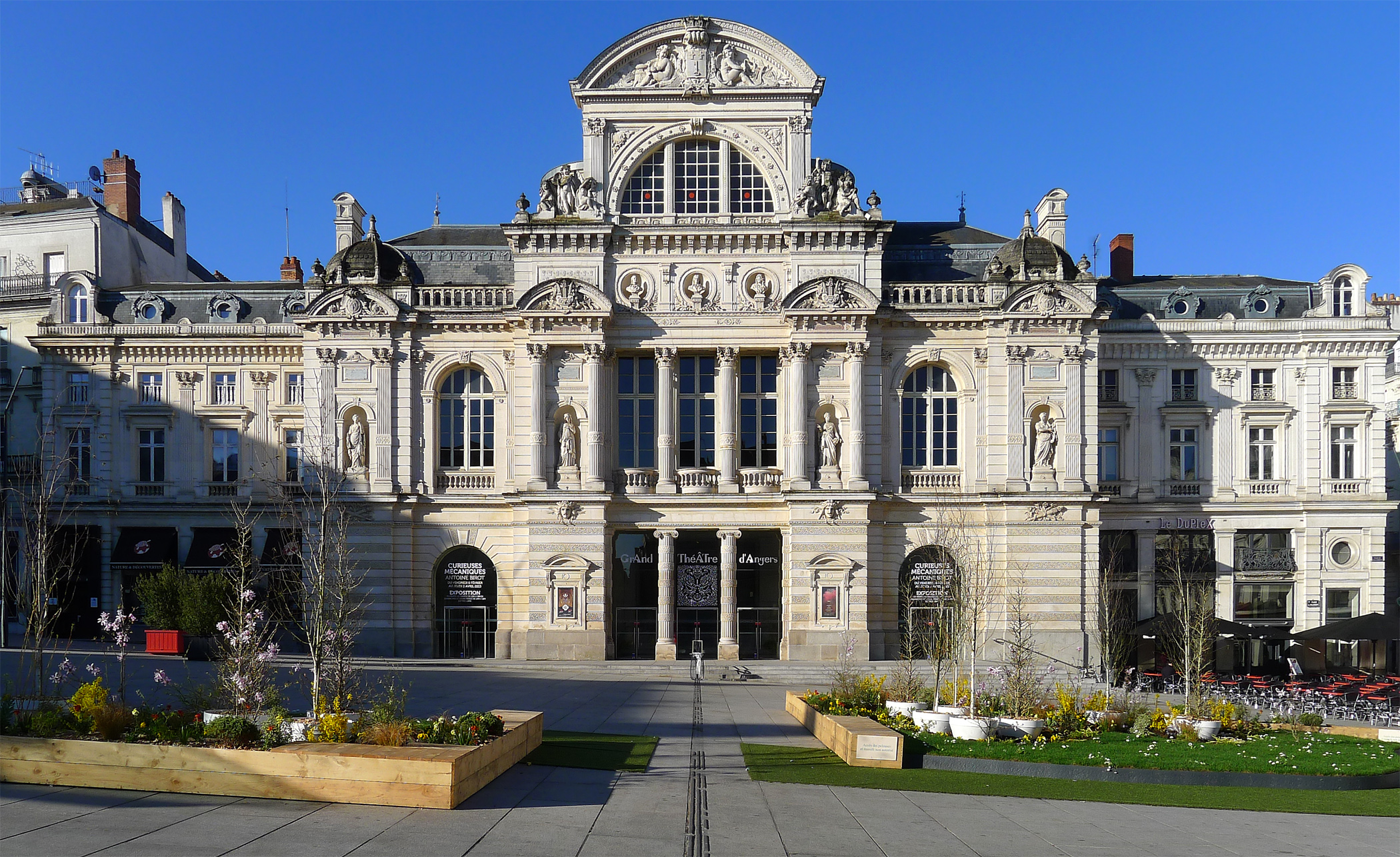
Grand Théâtre, Angers

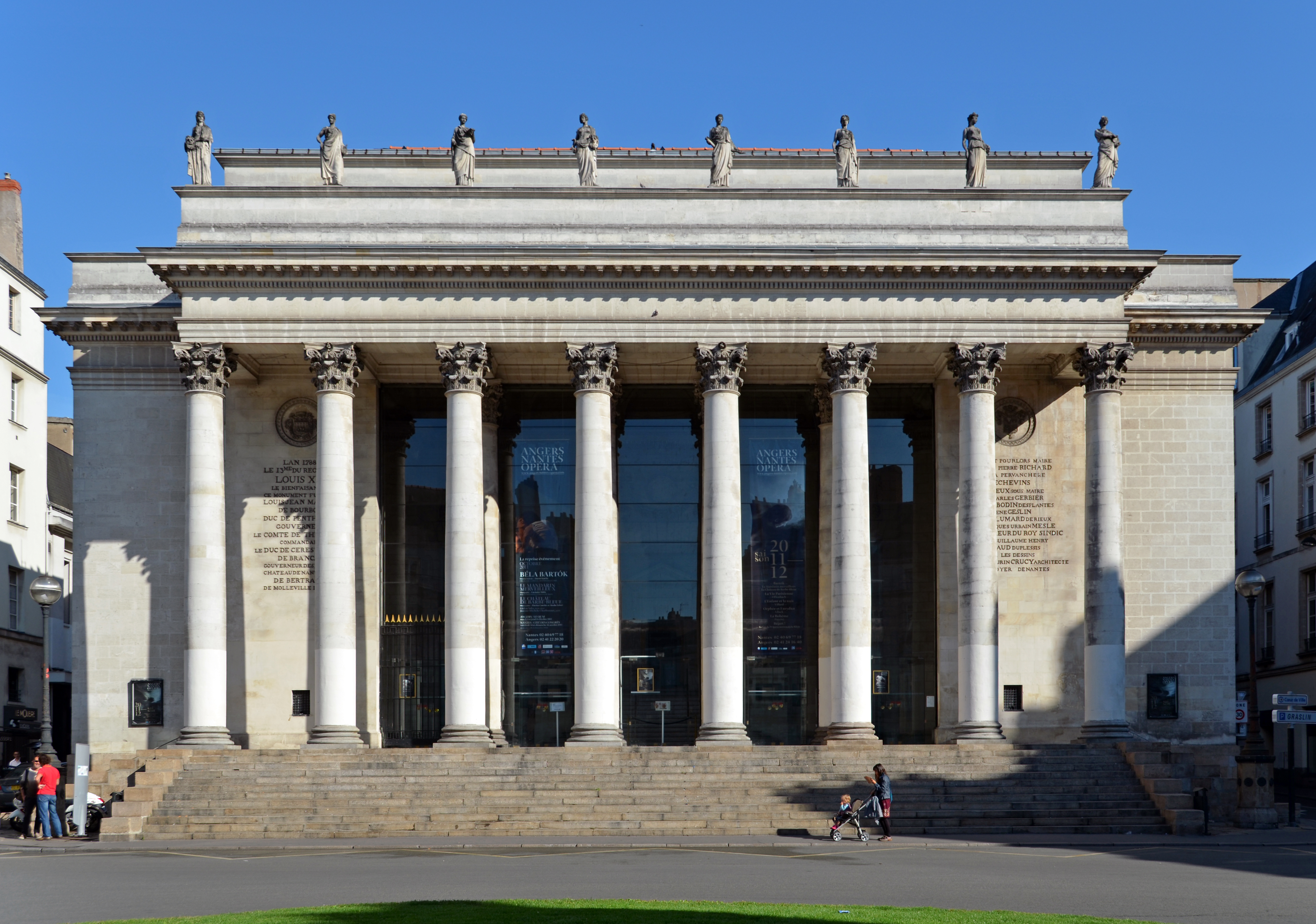
Théâtre Graslin, Nantes

The Angers-Nantes Opéra was created in January 2003 through the fusion of the opera companies of Angers and of Nantes, in order to give fresh impetus to the provision of opera throughout western France.

The company uses a variety of performance spaces in the two cities, and across the region, but the main spaces are the 728-seat Grand Théâtre in Angers, and the 784-seat Théâtre Graslin in Nantes.

The company is a member of the Réunion des Opéras de France. The General Director is Jean-Paul Davois.
