= Avenue Marceau =

Avenue in Paris, France

Coordinates: 48.87°N 2.29°E

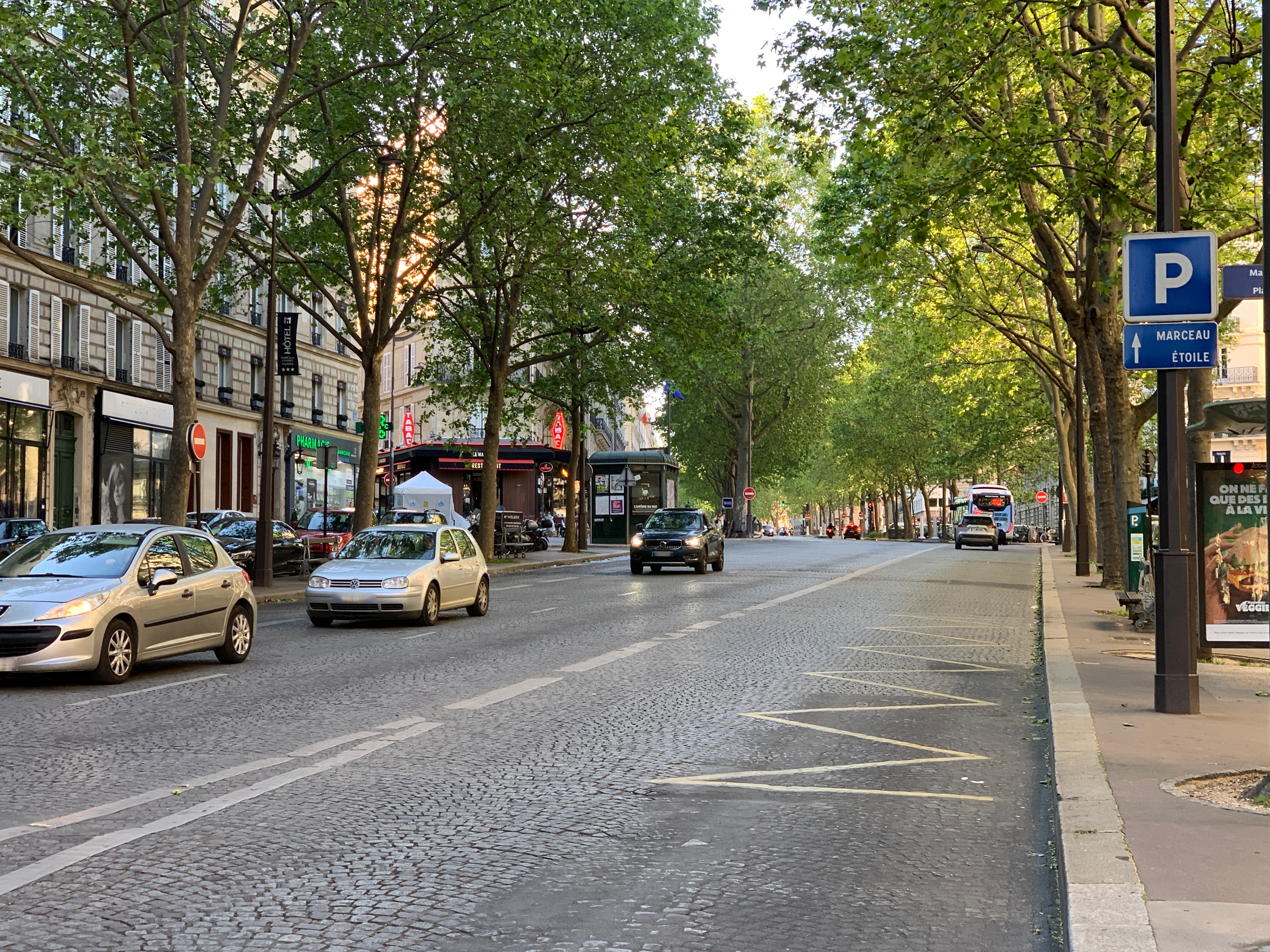
- The Avenue Marceau in 2021
- Interactive map of Avenue Marceau
- Namesake: François Séverin Marceau
- Type: Avenue
- Location: Paris, France
- Arrondissement: 8th and 16th

Construction
- Inauguration: 13 August 1854

The Avenue Marceau (French pronunciation: [avny maʁso]) is a major street in western Paris, France. It runs from Place Charles de Gaulle 900 meters south-south-east to Avenue du Président-Wilson, near the Place de l'Alma on the Seine. Primarily an upscale residential street, the Avenue is the boundary between the Champs-Élysées neighborhood in the 8th Arrondissement and the Chaillot neighborhood in the 16th.The Avenue is named after General François Séverin Marceau (1769–1796), a commander in the French Revolutionary Wars.

== History ==
A product of the new Paris street network of Napoleon III and Baron Haussmann, the Avenue was among the concentration of new traffic arteries built in the 1850s in the then-urbanizing area around Place Charles de Gaulle (then Place de l’Étoile), and in the Chaillot neighborhood between Étoile and the Seine. The Avenue was one of the twelve streets radiating from the redesigned Place de l’Étoile, all built to (at least) the 40-meter width of the Haussmannian boulevard.

The Étoile project, whose layout was finished in 1854, included the first, short segment of the Avenue south to the Rue du Presbourg. The remainder was completed by 1858, cutting through the existing street configuration to Avenue du Président-Wilson. It was named Avenue Joséphine after Joséphine de Beauharnais (1763-1814), first wife of Napoleon I and grandmother of the reigning Emperor.

After the suburban communes were annexed to the city in 1860 and the municipal districts redrawn, the Avenue was selected as the boundary between the new 8th and 16th arrondissements.

In the decade after the fall of Napoleon III in 1870, nearly all of the Paris streets named after members of the Bonaparte dynasty were renamed. A notion to rename Avenue Josephine as Avenue de Chaillot was dropped as there existed nearby a Rue de Chaillot. Another unsuccessful idea was to name it Avenue Eckmühl, following the pattern of naming the streets near the Place de l’Étoile after battles. The Avenue was given its present name in 1879, in a decision which also renamed a Rue Marceau in the 12th arrondissement as Rue de Wattignies. General Marceau’s funeral during the 1796 Rhine campaign is featured in a bas-relief on the Arch of Triumph carved in 1833.

From the beginning of the city’s tramway system in the 1880s, the Avenue hosted a segment of the route from Montparnasse to Étoile, extended after electrification to Pereire. It was replaced in 1932 by the current 92 bus line.

Like the other Étoile boulevards, Avenue Monceau soon attracted development of upscale residences and services, professionals’ offices, and diplomatic establishments. Since the 1950s it has also been an address for business offices, hotels and boutiques, but it is not primarily a commercial street.

French Wikipedia has a list of notable buildings, events, and persons related to the Avenue.
