= Chaillot =

Administrative quarter in Paris, France

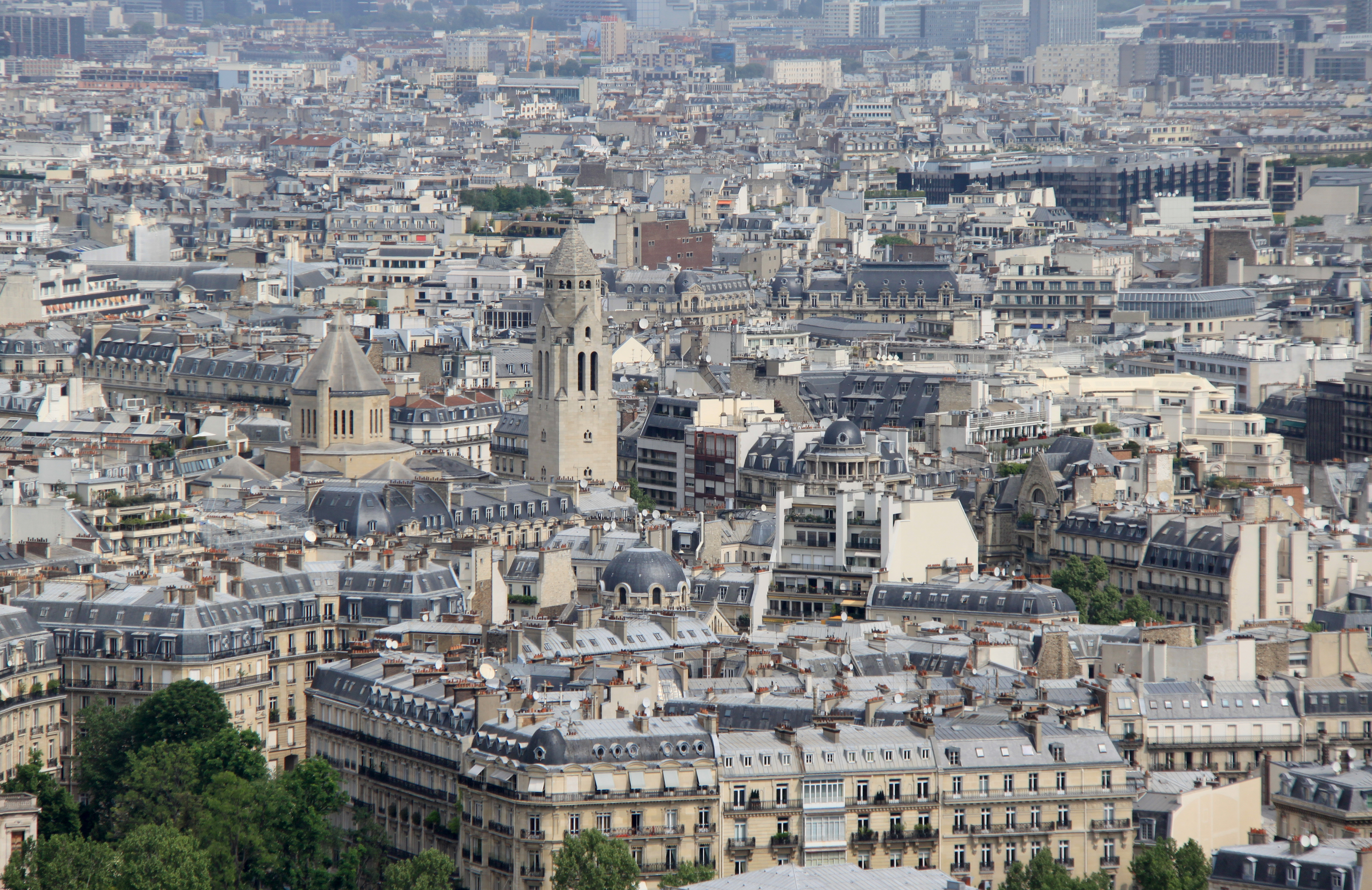
View of Chaillot from the Eiffel Tower's second level

Location of Chaillot in the 16th arrondissement of Paris

Chaillot (English: /ʃaɪˈoʊ/, French: [ʃajo]) is a quarter of Paris, France, located in the 16th arrondissement, on the Right Bank. It is adjacent to Passy to the southwest (administratively part of la Muette) and is bound by Avenue de la Grande-Armée to the north.

It is home to many of the city's wealthiest residents, and many embassies and museums.

== Toponymy ==
The first mention of Chaillot is that of its church, Ecclesia de Caleio, which appears in a Papal bull from 1097. In later Latin documents, the term varies between Callevio, Calloio, Challoio, Calloium, and Chalouel, then in the 13th century as Chailloel. In French, in the 14th century, it was most often written Chailluyau, in the 15th century, Chailluyau, Chaleau, Chayoux or Chailliau. The spelling Chaillot would not become the norm until the 19th century.

The name Chaillot comes from the French caillou meaning pebble.

== History ==
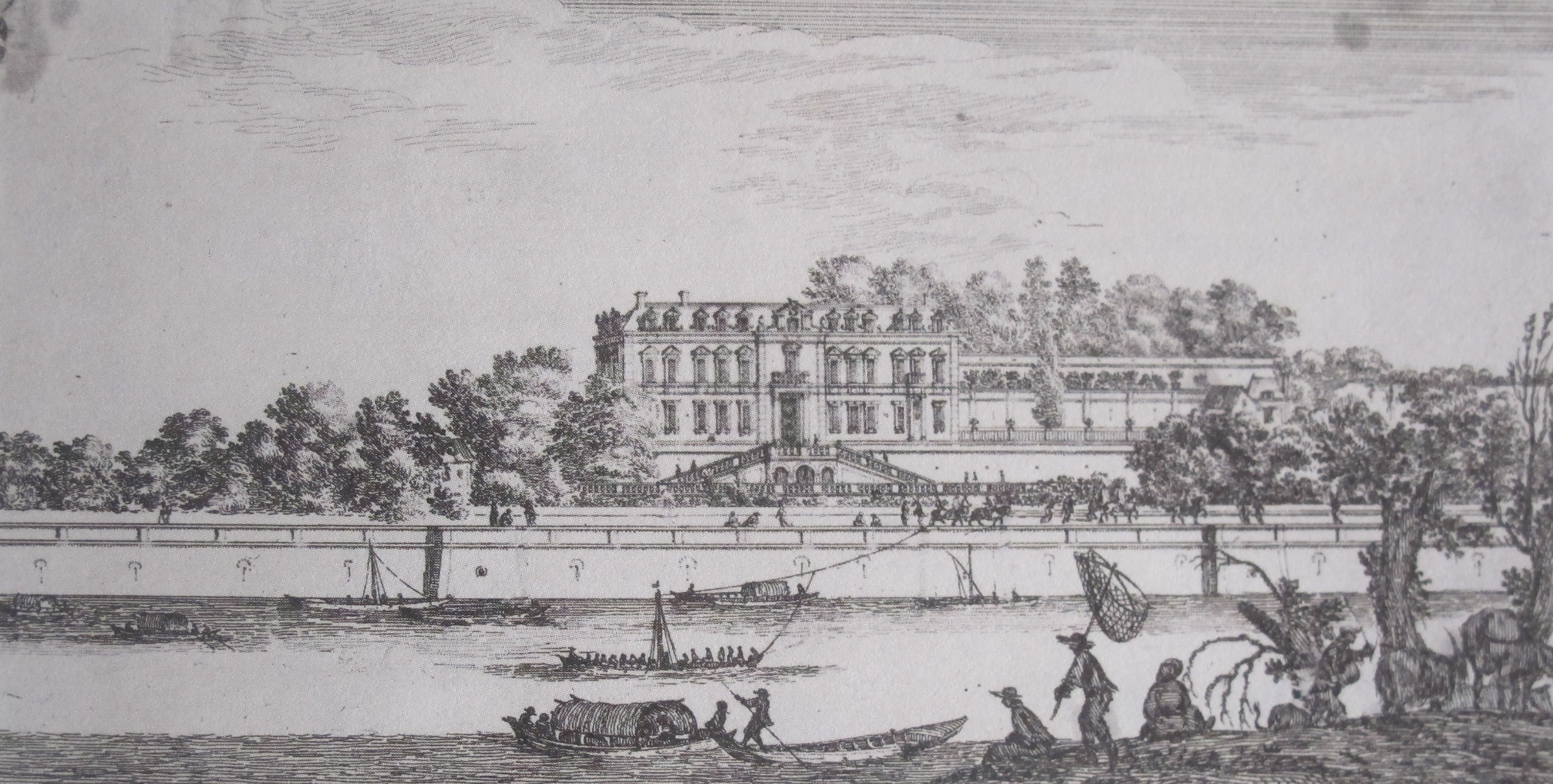
The Château de Chaillot

Chaillot was originally a village on the outskirts of Paris. In the 16th century, Catherine de' Medici built the Château de Chaillot (no longer existing). Chaillot was incorporated into the city of Paris in 1860 by the Law of 16 June 1859. At that time, it was planned that Auteuil and Passy would form a new arrondissement that would be numbered the 13th arrondissement, but "The rich and powerful moving in did not like the number. They pulled strings and became the 16th, the unlucky association and postmark being transferred to the blameless but less influential folks around Porte d'Italie."

== Landmarks ==
Among the landmarks of Chaillot are the Palais de Chaillot and the Jardins du Trocadéro at the Trocadéro, the Saint-Pierre de Chaillot church, the Musée Guimet, the Palais Galliera, and the Palais de Tokyo.

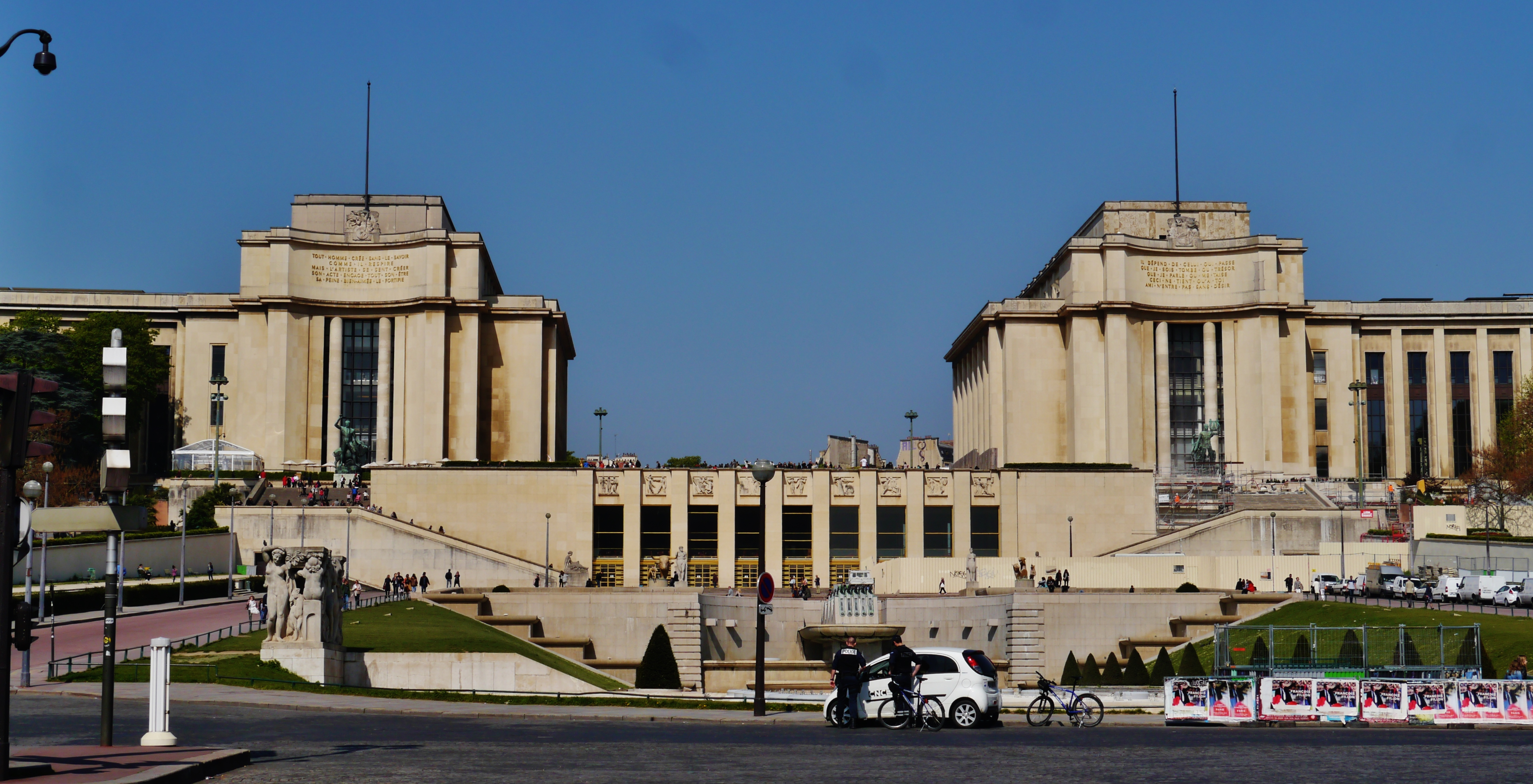
Palais de Chaillot

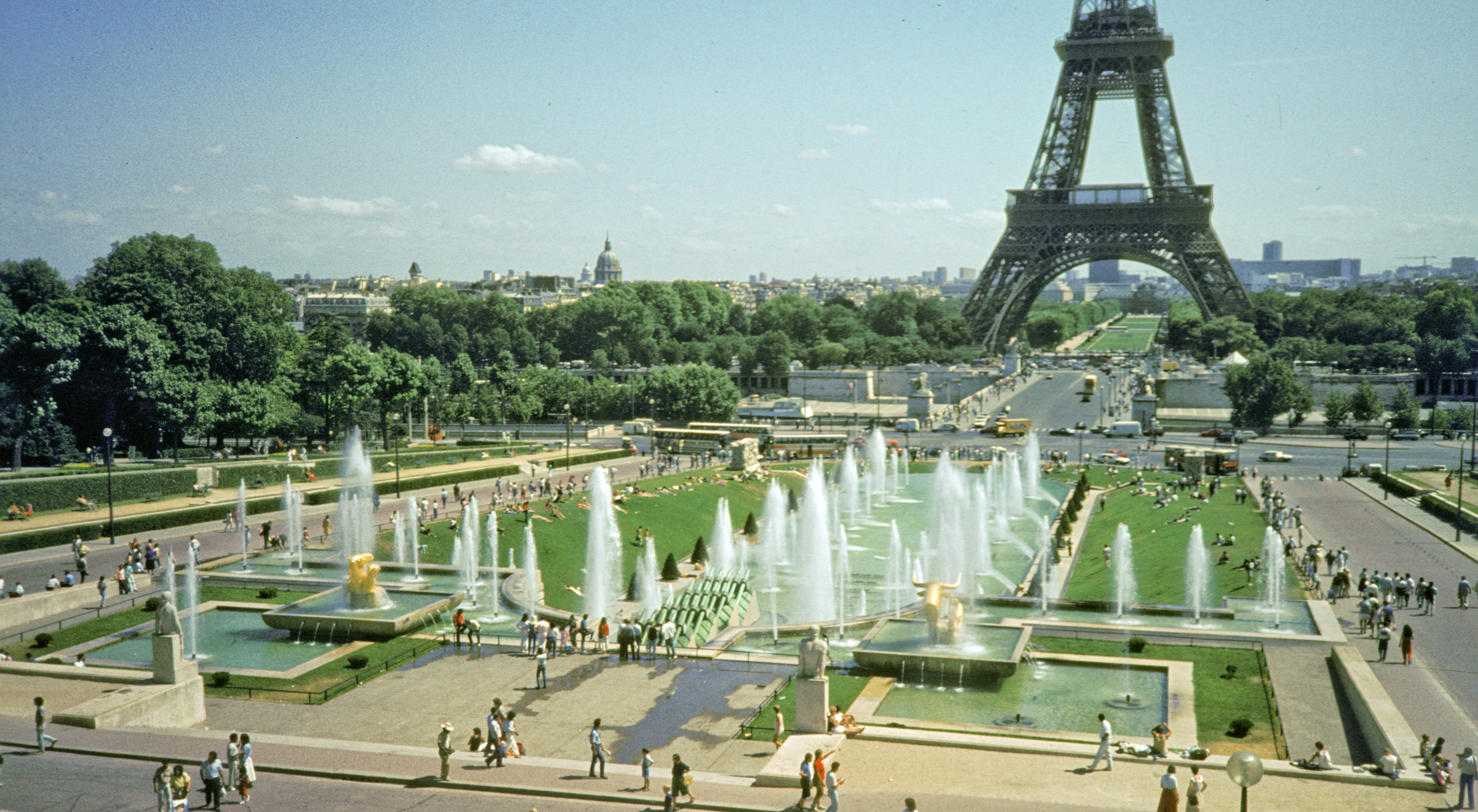
Trocadero Gardens

Saint-Pierre de Chaillot

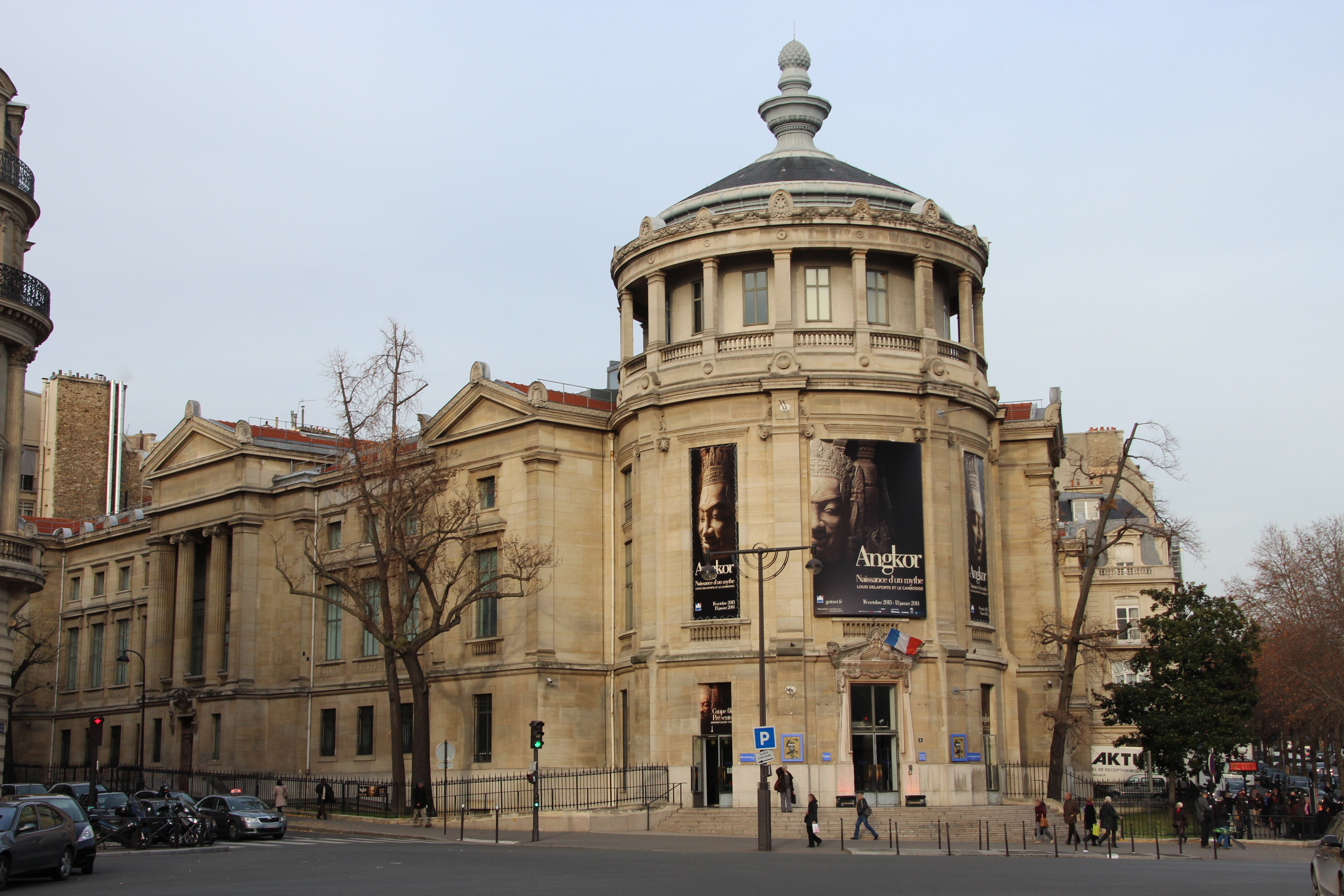
The Musée Guimet

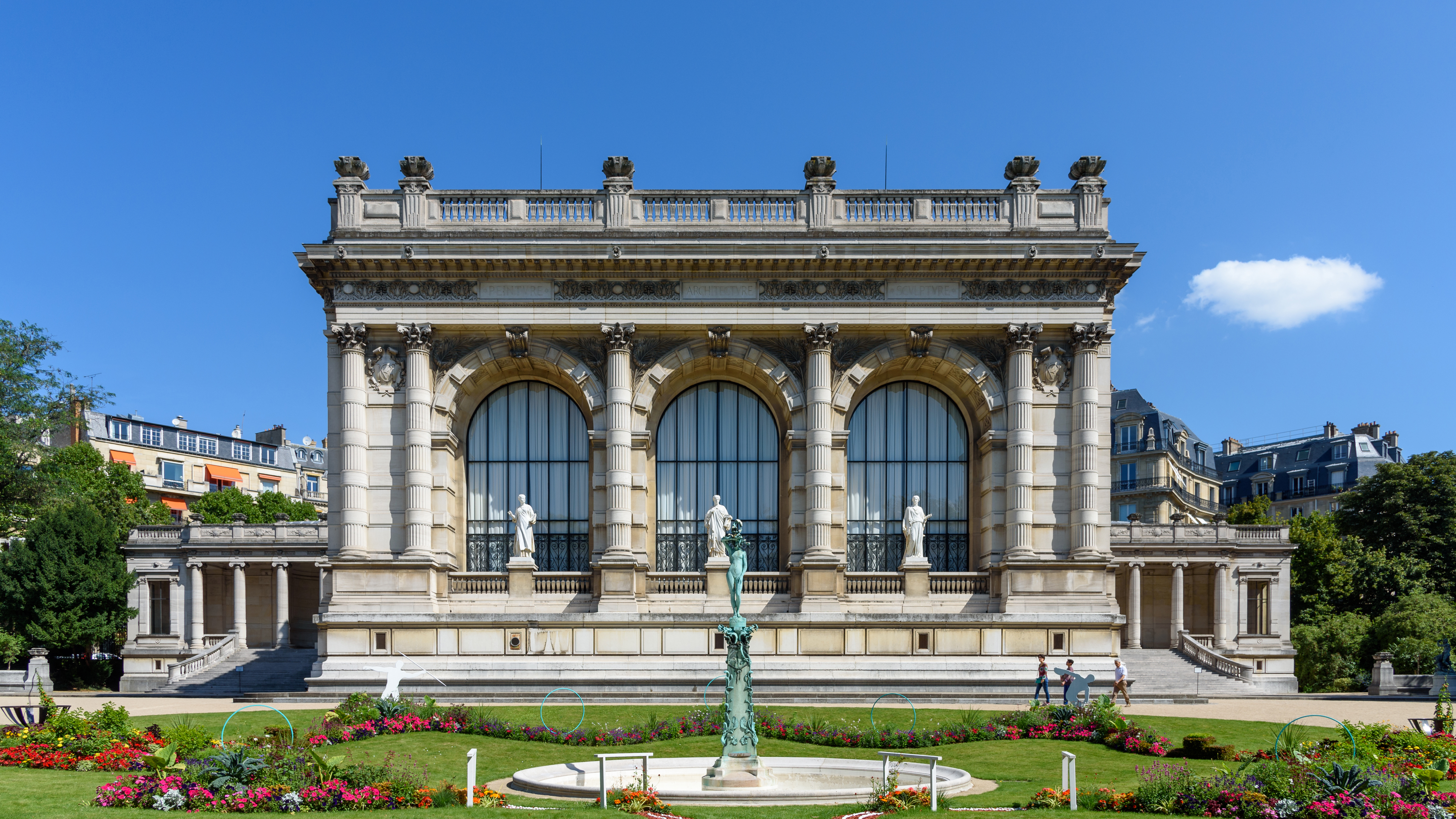
The Palais Galliera

The Palais de Tokyo

== Education ==
Lübeck School is located in Chaillot.

== Notable people ==
Marcel Proust died at his apartment 44 rue Hamelin, in Chaillot, in 1922.

== In popular culture ==
The Madwoman of Chaillot by Jean Giraudoux is set in a café on Place de l'Alma.

== Related articles ==
- Château de Chaillot
