= Palace of the King of Rome =

Coordinates: 48.8622°N 2.2881°E

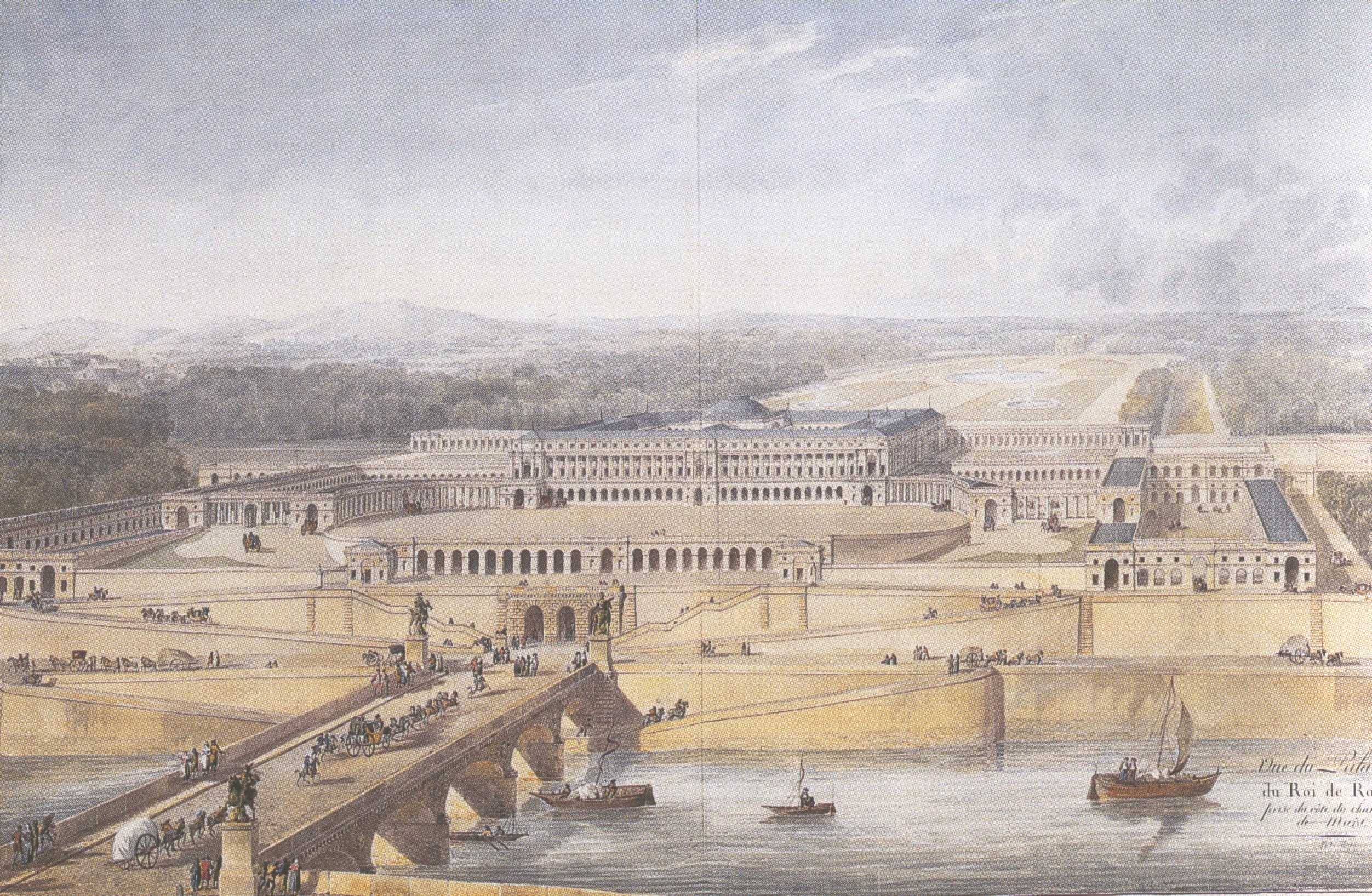
The Palace of the King of Rome as it would have looked from the Champ de Mars.

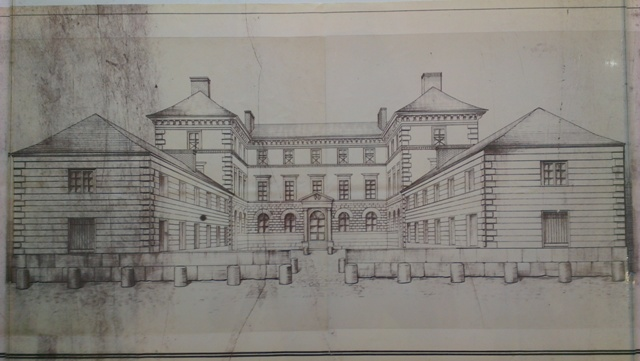
The Palace of the King of Rome in Rambouillet

The Palace of the King of Rome is the designation of two separate palaces intended for the use of the King of Rome, Napoleon II, son of Emperor Napoleon: an immense palace designed by the emperor in Paris on the hill of Chaillot, in the modern day area of Trocadéro in the 16th arrondissement, which was never built; and a smaller palace built in Rambouillet.

In February 1811, before the birth of his son, Napoleon I decided to build a palace on Chaillot hill calling it the palace of the king of Rome. Grand and beautiful, it was to be the center of an administrative and military imperial city. The ambitious premise and the fall of the empire meant that the palace was never built. Its designer, architect Pierre Fontaine, stated that the palace could have been "the most vast and most extraordinary work of our century."

The small palace of Rambouillet, originally intended for secondary use, was rebuilt by Auguste Famin. Due to the preparations for the French invasion of Russia and the diminishing resources of the French state, work on the larger Chaillot palace was halted. On March 2, 1812 the Rambouillet palace was officially given the title "palace of the King of Rome" and it was the only one of the two palaces that was finished.
