= Isabella of Scotland (disambiguation) =

Isabella of Scotland, Duchess of Brittany (1426–1494/1499) was the daughter of James I of Scotland and Joan Beaufort.

Isabella of Scotland (or Isabel or Isobel) may also refer to:

- Isabella of Scotland, Countess of Norfolk (1195–after October 1263), daughter of William the Lion and Ermengarde de Beaumont
- Isobel of Huntingdon (1199–1251), daughter of David, Earl of Huntingdon, and Matilda of Chester
- Isabel Stuart (1676–1681), daughter of James VII of Scotland and Mary of Modena
