= Louisa Maria Stuart =

- Princess Royal (titular)
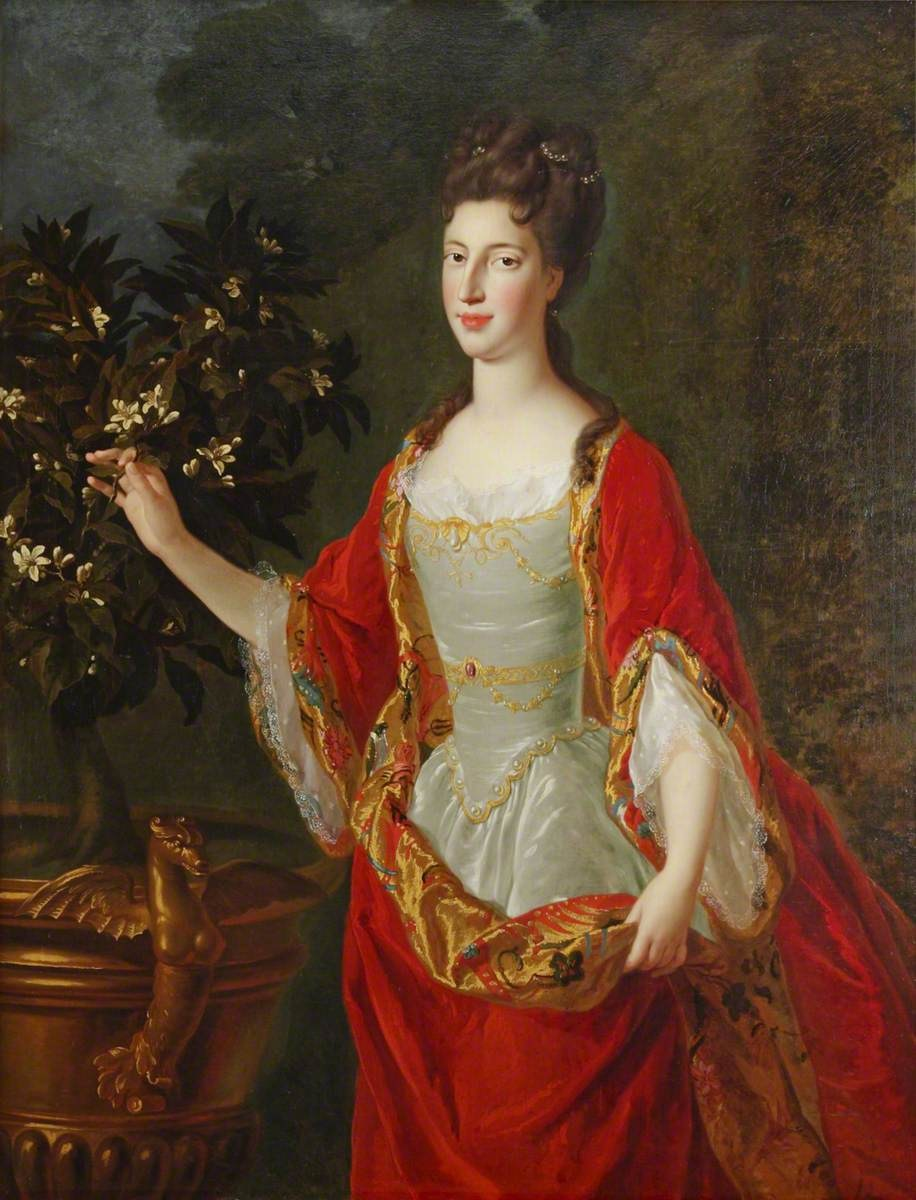
- Portrait, c. 1708–10
- Born: 28 June 1692; Château de Saint-Germain-en-Laye, France
- Died: 18 April 1712 (aged 19); Château de Saint-Germain-en-Laye, France
- Burial: Church of the English Benedictines, Paris
Names
- English: Louisa Maria Teresa Stuart; French: Louise Marie Thérèse Stuart
- House: Stuart
- Father: James II of England
- Mother: Mary of Modena
- Religion: Roman Catholicism

Louisa Maria Teresa Stuart (French: Louise Marie Thérèse; 28 June 1692 – 18 April 1712), known to Jacobites as The Princess Royal, was the last child of James II and VII, the deposed King of England, Scotland and Ireland, by his second wife Mary of Modena. Like her brother James Francis Edward Stuart (The Old Pretender), Louisa Maria was a Roman Catholic, which, under the Act of Settlement 1701, debarred them both from succession to the British throne after the death of their Protestant half-sister Anne, Queen of Great Britain.

A Royal Stuart Society paper calls Louisa Maria the Princess over the Water, an allusion to the informal title King over the Water of the Jacobite pretenders, none of whom had any other legitimate daughters.

== Birth ==
Louisa Maria was born in 1692, at Saint-Germain-en-Laye in France, four years after her father had fled England never to return. Owing to the huge controversy which had surrounded the birth of her brother, James Francis Edward, with accusations of the substitution of another baby in a warming pan following a still-birth, James II had sent letters inviting not only his daughter, Queen Mary II, to attend the birth in person, but also a large number of other Protestant ladies. The Whig historian Macaulay later commented on James's precaution:

Had some of those witnesses been invited to Saint James's on the morning of the tenth of June 1688, the House of Stuart might, perhaps, now be reigning in our island. But it is easier to keep a crown than to regain one. It might be true that a calumnious fable had done much to bring about the Revolution. But it by no means followed that the most complete refutation of that fable would bring about a Restoration. Not a single lady crossed the sea in obedience to James's call. His Queen was safely delivered of a daughter; but this event produced no perceptible effect on the state of public feeling in England.

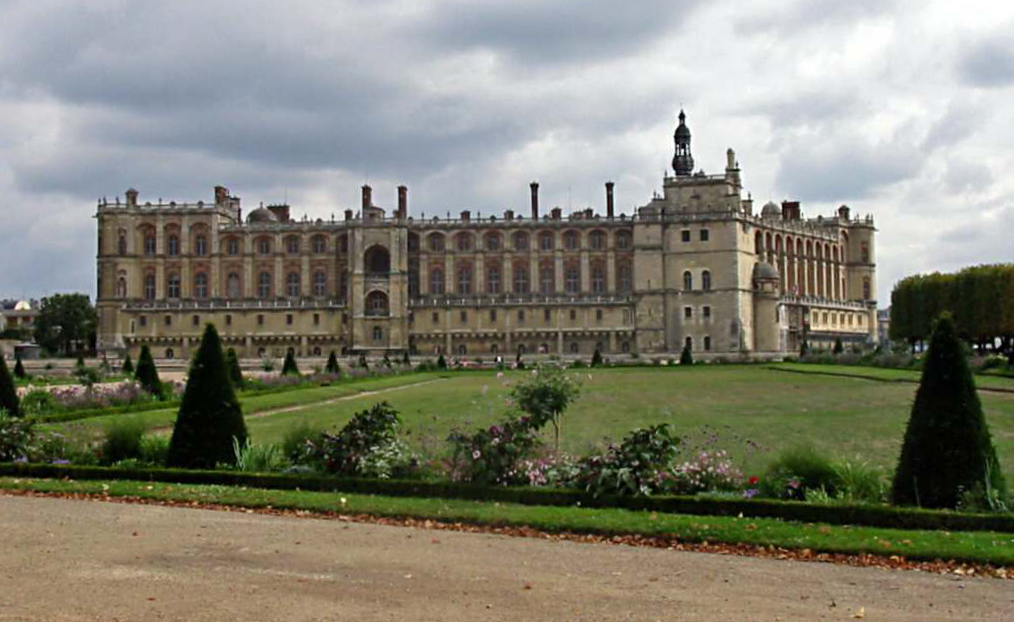
Louisa's birthplace, the Château of Saint-Germain-en-Laye.

After the birth, James II declared that Louisa Maria had been sent by God, as a consolation for her parents at the time of their deepest distress, in exile and hopelessness. In later years, she was often referred to as La Consolatrice.

The new-born princess was given the name Louisa Maria in baptism, while Teresa (sometimes spelt Theresa) was added later, at the time of her confirmation. Her godparents were King Louis XIV (in whose honour she was named), and King Louis's sister-in-law, Elizabeth Charlotte, Madame Palatine, Duchess of Orléans.

James II had fathered numerous children by his two wives, but only four of them survived infancy, and the two Protestant elder children, Queen Mary II and the future Queen Anne, lived in England. Only her brother James Francis Edward was close to Louisa, although she did have some contact with her elder half-sisters, Mary, who died while Louisa Maria was still a small child, and Anne, with whom she remained on friendly terms.

== Life ==
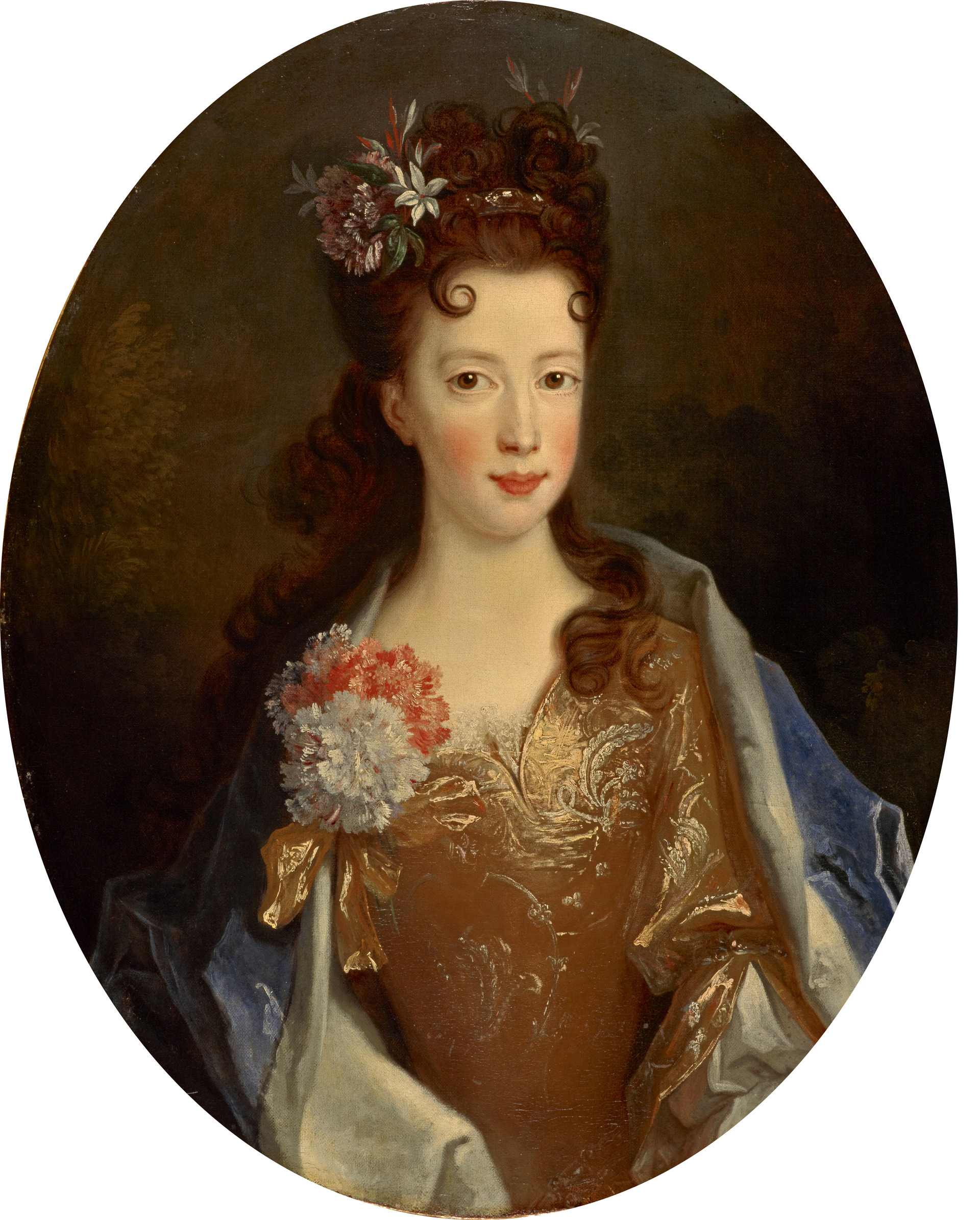
Portrait by Alexis Simon Belle, c. 1704

Louisa was the only full sibling of Prince James Francis Edward, the 'Old Pretender', to survive infancy, and was four years younger than her brother. The two were brought up together in France.

Louisa's tutor was an English Roman Catholic priest, Father Constable, who taught her Latin, history, and religion. She also had a governess, the Countess of Middleton, wife of the Jacobite peer Charles Middleton, 2nd Earl of Middleton. James Drummond, 4th Earl of Perth, another Jacobite peer living in France, praised the child's natural affability.

An allegorical portrait by Alexis Simon Belle of James Francis Edward and his sister Louisa Maria, showing the prince as a guardian angel leading his sister under the gaze of cherubim, was painted in 1699 and is now in the Royal Collection.

By the summer of 1701, King James was seriously ill, and had been away from Saint Germain seeking medical treatment, accompanied by his wife. However, in June the two returned home for the birthdays of their two children, and two months later James had a stroke, dying just two weeks later on 16 September. He was still able to talk when his children visited him for the last time, and to Louisa Maria he said:

Adieu, my dear child. Serve your creator in the days of your youth. Consider virtue as the greatest ornament of your sex. Follow close the great pattern of it, your mother, who has been, no less than myself, over-clouded with calumny. But time, the mother of truth, will, I hope, at last make her virtues shine as bright as the sun.

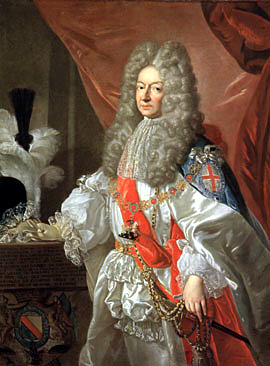
Louisa Maria's guardian Antonin Nompar de Caumont, 1st Duke of Lauzun, by Alexis Simon Belle

Soon after James's death, Louis XIV proclaimed James Francis Edward as king of England, Scotland and Ireland, and he was also formally recognised as king by Spain, the Papal States and Modena. He and his sister Louisa Maria were transferred to Passy, into the care of Antonin Nompar de Caumont, 1st Duke of Lauzun and his wife, with Lady Middleton continuing as Louisa Maria's governess there.

In 1705, at the age of thirteen, Louisa Maria was a guest of honour at a ball at the Château de Marly, ranking only after Louis XIV himself, her own mother Queen Mary, and her brother James Francis Edward, considered by Louis to be another King.

On 23 March 1708, after a delay caused by the measles, the young James attempted a landing on Scottish soil, at the Firth of Forth, supported by a fleet of French ships. However, the force was driven off by a Royal Navy fleet led by Admiral Byng.

Louisa Maria enjoyed dancing and the opera, and became popular at the French court. Two possible matches for her were considered, with Louis XIV's grandson Charles, Duke of Berry (1686–1714), and with King Charles XII of Sweden (1682–1718). Neither took place, the first apparently due to Louisa Maria's equivocal position, and the second because the young King of Sweden was not a Roman Catholic.

Louisa felt keenly that Jacobite supporters in exile had made huge sacrifices for her family, and she herself paid for the daughters of many of them to be educated, making no distinction between Roman Catholics and Protestants, supporting the daughters of both.

== Death ==
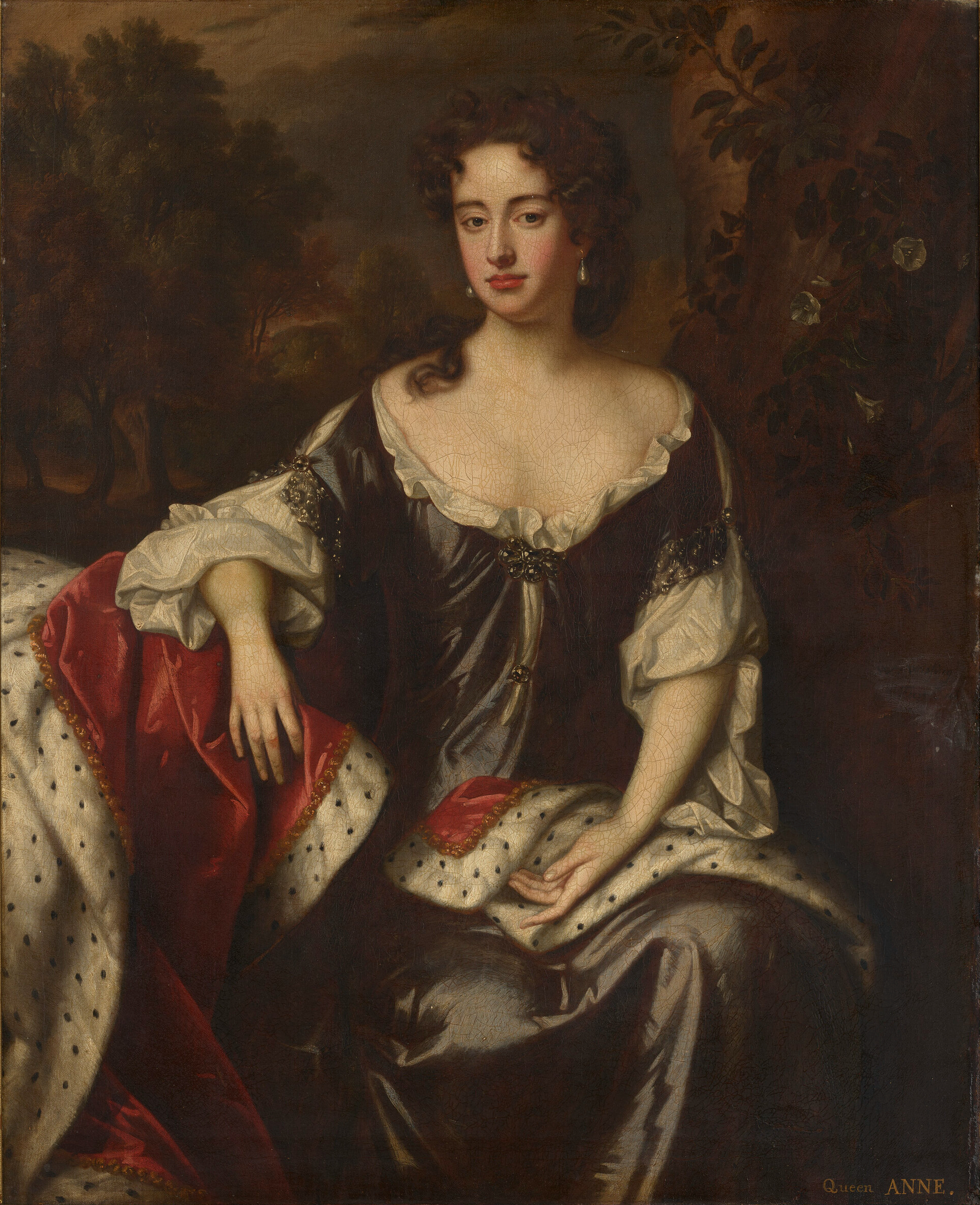
Louisa Maria's half-sister Queen Anne.

In April 1712, both James Francis Edward and his sister fell sick with smallpox. While the Old Pretender recovered, Louisa Maria died on 28 April (18 April, Old Style), aged 19, and was buried with her father at the Church of the English Benedictines in Paris. A French nobleman wrote of the death of the Princess to a friend at Utrecht:

My Lord, I send to you by these the sad and deplorable news of the much lamented death of the Princess Royal of England who died of the smallpox the 18th of this month at St Germains who as she was one of the greatest ornaments of that afflicted court, so she was the admiration of all Europe; never Princess was so universally regretted. Her death has filled all France with sighs, groans and tears. She was a Princess of a majestical mien and port; every motion spoke grandeur, every action was easy and without any affectation or meanness, and proclaim'd her a heroine descended from the long race of so many paternal and maternal heroes...

William Legge, 1st Earl of Dartmouth, the British Secretary of State, wrote of the Princess's death:

The Queen (i.e Anne) shewed me a letter wrote in the king of France's own hand, upon the death of her sister; in which there was the highest character that ever was given to any princess of her age. Mr. Richard Hill came straight from the Earl of Godolphin's... to me with the news, and said it was the worst that ever came to England. I asked him why he thought so. He said it had been happy if it had been her brother; for then the Queen might have sent for her and married her to Prince George [the future King George I], who could have no pretensions during her own life; which would have pleased every honest man in the kingdom, and made an end of all disputes for the future.

Madame de Maintenon, the morganatic second wife of Louis XIV, wrote of Mary of Modena's reaction to Louisa Maria's death:

I had the honour of passing two hours with the Queen of England, who is the very image of desolation. The Princess had become her friend and only consolation.

In The History of the Church of Scotland (1845), Thomas Stephen says of the death:

On the 12th of April this year, the Princess Louisa Maria Teresa, youngest daughter of the late King James, died of the small-pox at St. Germains, to the regret of many in England, even of those who were unfriendly to her brother's claims. She received a very high character from those who had an opportunity of appreciating it, and was a princess justly esteemed for her wit, and all those qualities worthy of her high birth.

Like many other churches in Paris, the Church of the English Benedictines was desecrated and vandalised during the French Revolution. According to Jules Janin, writing in 1844, the remains of Princess Louisa Maria and her father King James II were then resting in the church of Val-de-Grâce.

== Portraits ==
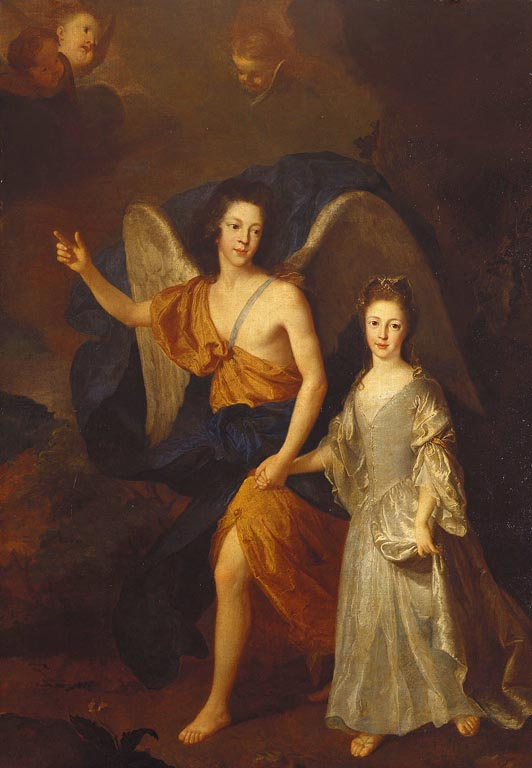
Portrait of Louisa Maria and her brother James Francis Edward by Alexis Simon Belle, about 1699

Several portraits of Louisa Maria survive. Among those of Louisa Maria alone, one is by François de Troy, ca. 1705, while another, painted about 1704, is attributed to Alexis Simon Belle and is in the National Portrait Gallery, London. Also in the National Portrait Gallery is a portrait painted in 1695 by Nicolas de Largillière of Louisa Maria with her brother James Francis Edward. This was engraved as a mezzotint by John Smith and published in 1699. Another portrait of Louisa Maria with her brother, depicting him as an angel, is in the Royal Collection and is again attributed to Belle. A portrait with a Cavalier King Charles Spaniel was engraved as a mezzotint by Bernard Lens the Younger and published c. 1700.

== In fiction ==
Princess Louisa appears at the age of twelve in Eliza Haywood's picaresque novel The Fortunate Foundlings (1744). Haywood says of Louisa:

...the ladies who attended her were all of them much of the same age; and to shew the respect the French had for this royal family, tho' in misfortunes, were also the daughters of persons whose birth and fortune might have done honour to the service of the greatest empress in the world... in beauty, the princess herself was esteemed a Prodigy.

== Namesakes ==
The names Louisa Maria Teresa (in French, Louise-Marie-Thérèse) were later used for Luisa Maria Teresa of Parma (1751–1819), Queen consort of Charles IV of Spain, for Louise Marie Thérèse of France, the eldest daughter of Charles Ferdinand, Duke of Berry, born 1819, and for Louise Marie Thérèse Charlotte Isabelle of Orléans, daughter of King Louis Philippe I of France and Queen of King Leopold I of Belgium.

== Family and ancestry ==
The British monarchs of the House of Stuart, their relations, and the transition to the Hanovers

James V 1512–1542 r. 1513–1542	Christian III of Denmark; 1503–1559
Mary, Queen of Scots; 1542–1587 r. 1542–1567	Frederick II of Denmark; 1534–1588	Dorothea of Denmark; 1546–1617
James VI and I 1566–1625 r. 1567/1603–1625	Anne of Denmark; 1574–1619	George, Duke of Brunswick-Calenberg; 1582–1641
Henrietta Maria of France; 1609–1669	Charles I 1600–1649 r. 1625–1649	Elizabeth Stuart, Queen of Bohemia; 1596–1662
HANOVER
Charles II; 1630–1685 r. 1660–1685	Mary, Princess Royal and Princess of Orange; 1631–1660	Anne Hyde; 1637–1671	James II and VII; 1633–1701 r. 1685–1688	Mary of Modena; 1658–1718	Sophia of Hanover; 1630–1714	Ernest Augustus, Elector of Hanover; 1629–1698
James Scott, Duke of Monmouth (illegitimate); 1649–1685	William III; 1650–1702 r. 1689–1702	Mary II; 1662–1694 r. 1689–1694	Anne; 1665–1714 r. 1702–1714	James Francis Edward Stuart "the Old Pretender"; 1688–1766	Louisa Maria Stuart; 1692–1712	George I 1660–1727 r. 1714–1727
(no children)	Prince William, Duke of Gloucester; 1689–1700	Charles Edward Stuart "the Young Pretender"; 1720–1788	Henry Benedict Stuart "Cardinal Duke of York"; 1725–1807	George II; 1683–1760 r. 1727–1760

Ancestors of Louisa Maria Stuart

8. James VI and I
4. Charles I of England
9. Anne of Denmark
2. James II of England
10. Henry IV of France
5. Henrietta Maria of France
11. Marie de' Medici
1. Louisa Maria Teresa Stuart
12. Francesco I d'Este, Duke of Modena
6. Alfonso IV d'Este, Duke of Modena
13. Maria Farnese
3. Mary of Modena
14. Girolamo Martinozzi
7. Laura Martinozzi
15. Laura Margherita Mazzarini

== See also ==
- Jacobitism
- Act of Settlement 1701
- Correspondence with James the Pretender (High Treason) Act 1701
- Monument to the Royal Stuarts

== Bibliography ==
- A true and full account of the death and character of the Princess-Royal, Louisa-Maria-Teresa Stuart, daughter of the late King James. Who was born in the year 1692, at St Germains, and died of the small-pox the 18th of April 1712... In a letter from a noble-man of France, to his correspondent at Vtrecht broadside, 2 s., 1712
- Cole, Susan, Princess over the Water: A Memoir of Louise Marie Stuart (1692–1712) (The Royal Stuart Society papers, Paper XVIII)

Titles in pretence
Vacant Title last held by Mary	— TITULAR — Princess Royal; 1692–1712	Vacant Title next held by Anne
