= Mary of Modena =

Queen of England, Scotland and Ireland from 1685 to 1688

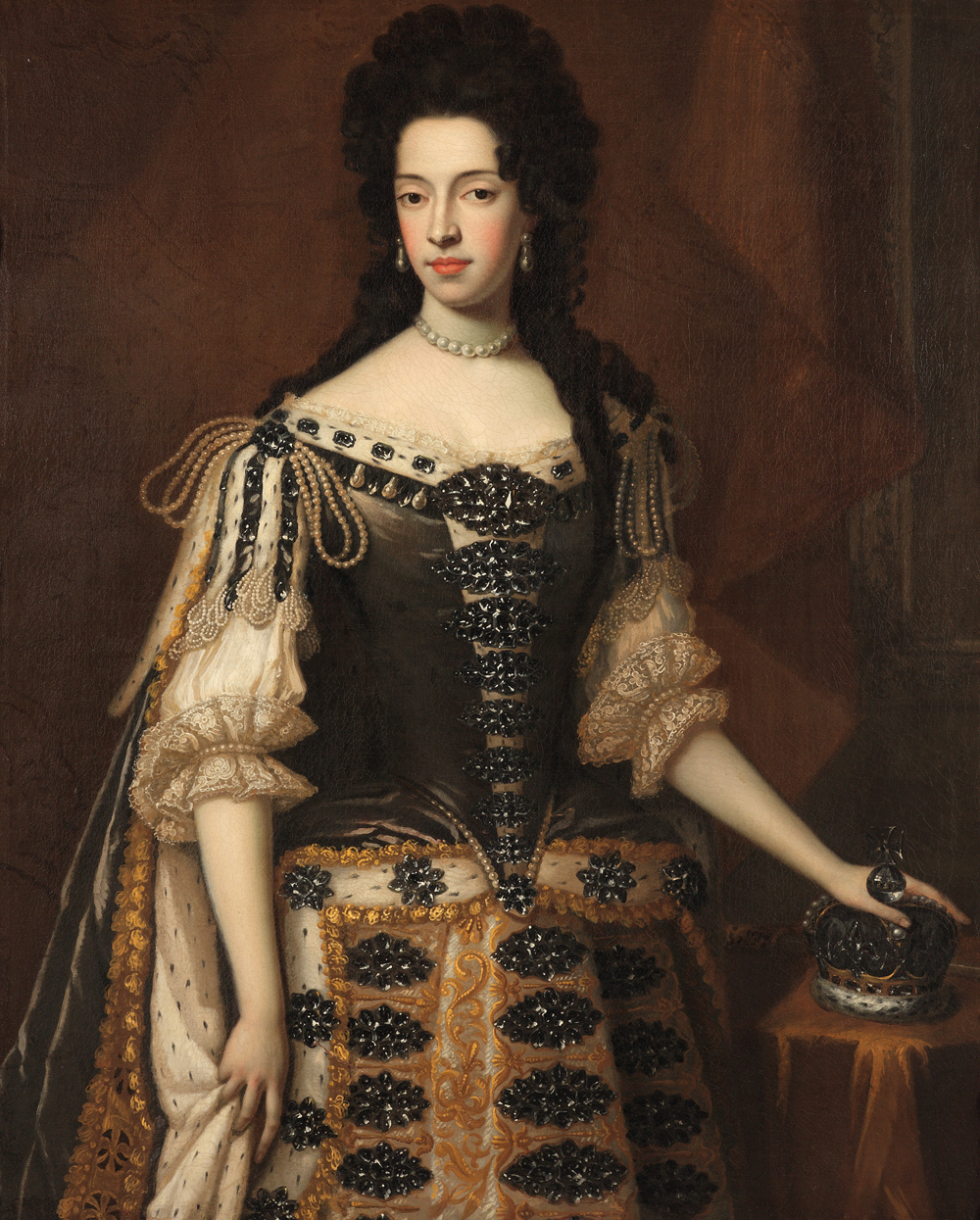
- Portrait, c. 1687

Queen consort of England, Scotland, and Ireland
- Tenure: 6 February 1685 – 11 December 1688
- Coronation: 23 April 1685
- Born: 5 October 1658; Ducal Palace, Modena, Duchy of Modena and Reggio
- Died: 7 May 1718 (aged 59); Château de Saint-Germain-en-Laye, Paris, France
- Burial: Convent of the Visitandines, Chaillot, France
- Spouse: James II of England (m. 1673; died 1701)
- Issue among others: Isabel Stuart; Charles, Duke of Cambridge; James Francis Edward, Prince of Wales; Louisa Maria Stuart
Names
- Maria Beatrice Eleonora Anna Margherita Isabella d'Este
- House: Este
- Father: Alfonso IV d'Este, Duke of Modena
- Mother: Laura Martinozzi

Mary of Modena (Italian: Maria Beatrice Eleonora Anna Margherita Isabella d'Este; 5 October [O.S. 25 September] 1658 – 7 May [O.S. 26 April] 1718) was Queen of England, Scotland and Ireland as the second wife of James VII and II. A devout Roman Catholic, Mary married the widower James, who was then the younger brother and heir presumptive of Charles II. She was devoted to James and their children, two of whom survived to adulthood: the Jacobite claimant to the thrones, James Francis Edward Stuart, and Louisa Maria Stuart.

Born a princess of the northwestern Italian Duchy of Modena, Mary is primarily remembered for the controversial birth of Prince James Francis Edward, her only surviving son. It was widely rumoured that he was smuggled into the birth chamber in a warming pan in order to perpetuate her husband's Roman Catholic Stuart dynasty. James Francis Edward's birth was a contributing factor to the "Glorious Revolution", the revolution which deposed James VII and II, and replaced him with Mary II, a Protestant, the elder of James II's daughters from his first marriage to Anne Hyde (1637–1671). Mary II and her husband, William III of Orange, would reign jointly over all three kingdoms.

Mary went into exile in France, being known as the "Queen over the Water" among the Jacobites. She lived with her husband and children in the Château de Saint-Germain-en-Laye, provided by King Louis XIV. Mary was popular among Louis's courtiers; James, however, was considered a bore. In widowhood, Mary spent time with the nuns at the Convent of Chaillot, frequently during summers with her daughter, Louisa Maria Teresa. In 1701, when James II died, young James Francis Edward, aged 13, became king in the eyes of the Jacobites. Given that he was too young to assume the nominal reins of government, Mary represented him until he reached the age of 16. When James Francis Edward was asked to leave France as part of the settlement from the Treaty of Utrecht in 1713, which ended the War of the Spanish Succession (1701–1714), Mary stayed despite having no family there, her daughter having died of smallpox. Fondly remembered by her French contemporaries, Mary died of breast cancer in 1718.

== Early life (1658–1673) ==
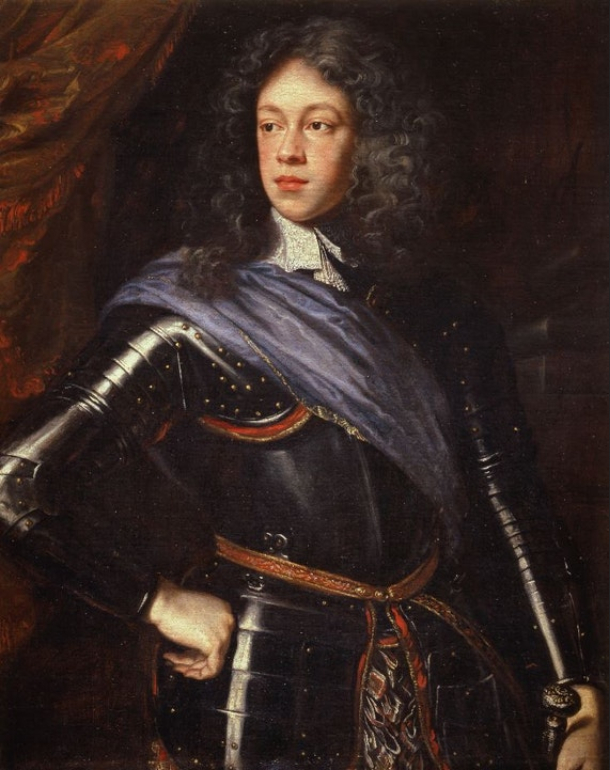
Alfonso IV d'Este, Duke of Modena, Mary's father, in a portrait by Justus Sustermans

Maria Beatrice d'Este, the second (but eldest surviving) child of Alfonso IV d'Este, Duke of Modena, and his wife, Laura Martinozzi, was born on 5 October 1658 NS (Note: Modena and France used the Gregorian calendar, indicated by modern historians with the initials "NS" (for "New Style"), while England and Scotland (and some of central Protestant Europe, such as the Netherlands, Germany, and Switzerland) still used the older Julian calendar (designated by initials "OS" for "Old Style"). Therefore, for the duration of the 17th century, English/"Julian" dates were ten days behind Modena and France's Gregorian dates, with most of the rest of continental Catholic Europe. From 29 February 1700 to 14 September 1752, the difference was eleven days.) in Modena, Duchy of Modena, Italy. Her only younger brother, Francesco, succeeded their father as Duke upon the latter's death in 1662, the year Mary turned four. Mary and Francesco's mother, Laura, was strict with them and acted as regent of the duchy until her son came of age. Mary's education was excellent; she spoke Italian and French fluently, had a good knowledge of Latin and, later, mastered English.

Mary was described by contemporaries as "tall and admirably shaped", and was sought as a bride for James, Duke of York, by Lord Peterborough. Lord Peterborough was Groom of the Stool to the Duke of York. A widower, James was the younger brother and heir of Charles II of England. Duchess Laura was not initially forthcoming with a reply to Peterborough's proposal, hoping, according to the French ambassador, for a "grander" match with the eleven-year-old Charles II of Spain. Whatever the reason for Laura's initial reluctance, she finally accepted the proposal on behalf of Mary, and they were married by proxy on 30 September 1673, she just shy of 15, he being 39.

Modena was within the sphere of influence of Louis XIV of France, who endorsed Mary's candidature and greeted Mary warmly in Paris, where she stopped en route to England, giving her a brooch worth £8,000. (Note: equivalent to $1,507,429 in 2025) Her reception in England was much cooler. Parliament, which was entirely composed of Protestants, reacted poorly to the news of a Roman Catholic marriage, fearing it was a "Papist" plot against the country. The English public, who were predominantly Protestant, branded the Duchess of York—as Mary was thereafter known as until her husband's accession—the "Pope's daughter". Parliament threatened to have the marriage annulled, leading Charles to suspend parliament until 7 January 1674 OS, to ensure the marriage would be honoured and safeguarding the reputation of his House of Stuart.

== Duchess of York (1673–1685) ==
=== Household ===
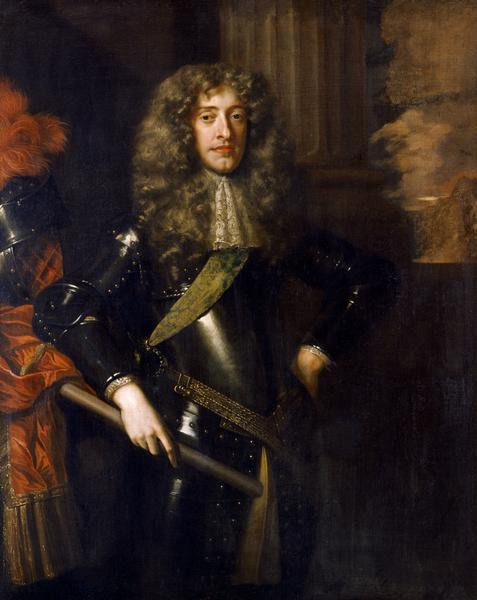
James, Duke of York, in a portrait by Sir Peter Lely

James, an avowed Roman Catholic, was twenty-five years older than his bride, scarred by smallpox and afflicted with a stammer. He had secretly converted to Catholicism around 1668. Mary first saw her husband on 23 November 1673 OS, on the day of their second marriage ceremony. James was pleased with his bride. Mary, however, at first disliked him, and burst into tears each time she saw him. Nonetheless, she soon warmed to James. From his first marriage to Anne Hyde, a commoner, who had died in 1671, James had two daughters: Lady Mary and Lady Anne. They were introduced to Mary by James with the words, "I have brought you a new play-fellow". Unlike Lady Mary, Lady Anne disliked her father's new wife. Mary played games with Anne to win her affection.

The Duchess of York received £5,000 spending money annually and her own household, headed by Carey Fraser, Countess of Peterborough; it was frequented by ladies of her husband's selection: Frances Stewart, Duchess of Richmond and Anne Scott, 1st Duchess of Buccleuch. That Mary loathed gambling did not stop her ladies compelling her to do so almost every day. They believed that "if she refrained, it might be taken ill". Consequently, Mary incurred minor gambling debts.

The birth of Mary's first child, Catherine Laura, named after Queen Catherine, on 10 January 1675 OS represented the beginning of a string of children that would die in infancy. At this time the Duchess of York was on excellent terms with Lady Mary, and visited her in The Hague after the younger Mary had married William of Orange. She travelled incognito and took Lady Anne with her.

=== Popish Plot and exile ===
The Duchess's Catholic secretary, Edward Colman, was, in 1678, falsely implicated in a fictitious plot against the King by Titus Oates. The plot, known as the Popish Plot, led to the Exclusionist movement, which was headed by Anthony Ashley Cooper, 1st Earl of Shaftesbury. The Exclusionists sought to debar the Catholic Duke of York from the throne. Their reputation in tatters, the Yorks were reluctantly exiled to Brussels, a domain of King Charles II of Spain, ostensibly to visit Lady Mary—since 1677 the wife of Prince William III of Orange. Accompanied by her not yet three-year-old daughter Isabella and Lady Anne, the Duchess of York was saddened by James's extra-marital affair with Catherine Sedley. Mary's spirits were briefly revived by a visit from her mother, who was living in Rome.

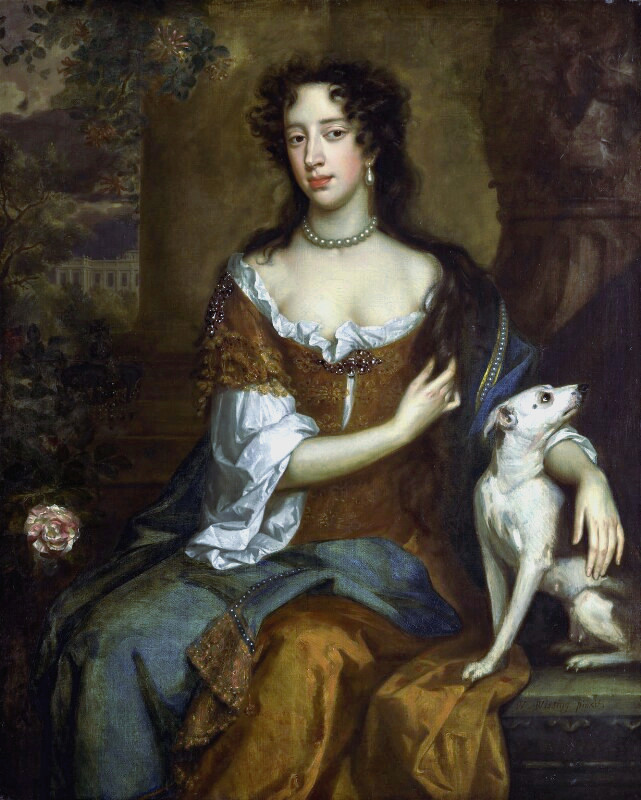
Mary in the year of her husband's accession, 1685, in a painting by the Dutch artist Willem Wissing

A report that King Charles was very sick sent the Yorks hastily back to England. They feared the King's eldest illegitimate son, James Scott, 1st Duke of Monmouth, the commander of England's armed forces, might usurp the crown if Charles died before their return. The danger was compounded by the fact that Monmouth enjoyed the support of the Exclusionists, who held a majority in the English House of Commons. Charles survived but, feeling the Yorks returned to court too soon, sent James and Mary to Edinburgh, where they stayed on-and-off for the next three years. Lodging in Holyrood Palace, the Yorks had to make do without Ladies Anne and Isabella, who stayed in London on Charles's orders. The Yorks were recalled to London in February 1680, only to return again to Edinburgh that autumn; this time they went on a more honourable footing: James was created King's Commissioner to Scotland. Separated from Lady Isabella once again, Mary sank into a state of sadness, exacerbated by the passing of the Exclusion bill in the Commons. Isabella, thus far the only one of Mary's children to survive infancy, died in February 1681. Isabella's death plunged Mary into a religious mania, worrying her physician. At the same time as news reached Holyrood of Isabella's death, Mary's mother was falsely accused of offering £10,000 for the murder of the King. The accuser, a pamphleteer, was executed by order of the King.

The Exclusionist reaction that followed the Popish Plot had died down by May 1682. Exclusionist-dominated Parliament, suspended since March 1681, never again met in the reign of Charles II. Therefore, the Duke and Duchess returned to England, and Mary gave birth to a daughter named Charlotte Mary in August 1682; Charlotte Mary's death three weeks later, according to the French ambassador, robbed James of "hope that any child of his can live"—all James's sons by his first wife died in infancy. James's sadness was dispelled by his revival in popularity following the discovery of a plot to kill him and Charles. The objective of the plot, known as the Rye House Plot, was to have Monmouth placed on the throne as Lord Protector. The revival was so strong that, in 1684, James was re-admitted to the Privy Council, after an absence of eleven years.

== Queen consort (1685–1688) ==
Despite all the furore over Exclusionism, James ascended his brother's thrones easily upon the latter's death—which occurred on 6 February 1685 OS—possibly owing to the risk that the said alternative might provoke another civil war. Mary sincerely mourned Charles, recalling in later life, "He was always kind to me." Mary and James's £119,000 coronation, occurring on 23 April OS, Saint George's day, was meticulously planned. Precedents were sought for Mary because a full-length joint coronation had not occurred since the coronation of King Henry VIII and Queen Catherine.

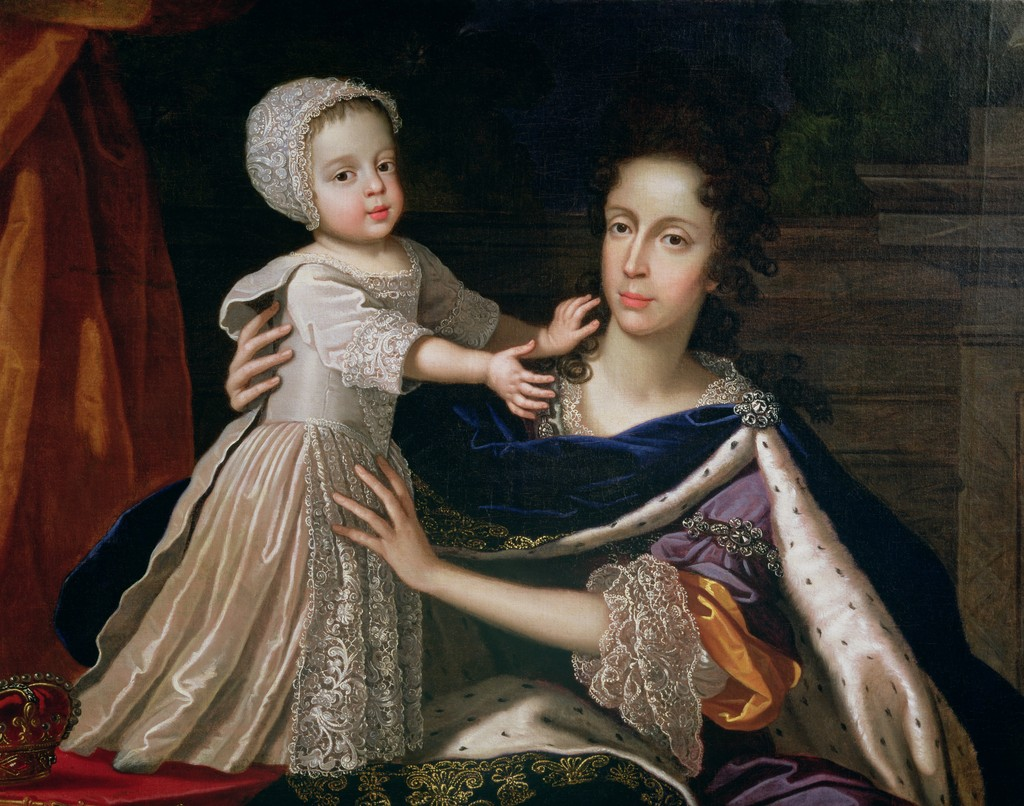
Queen Mary with her son, James Francis Edward, by Benedetto Gennari the Younger

Queen Mary's health had still not recovered after the death of Lady Isabella. So much so, in fact, that the Tuscan envoy reported to Florence that "general opinion turns [for Mary's successor] in the direction of the Princess, Your Highness's daughter". France, too, was preparing for Mary's imminent demise, putting forward as its candidate for James's new wife the Duke of Enghien's daughter. The Queen was then trying to make her brother, the Duke of Modena, marry the former, Anna Maria Luisa de' Medici.

In February 1687, Mary, at the time irritated by James's affair with Catherine Sedley, Countess of Dorchester, moved into new apartments in Whitehall; Whitehall had been home to a Catholic chapel since December 1686. Her apartments were designed by Christopher Wren at the cost of £13,000. Because the palace's renovation was thus far unfinished, James received ambassadors in her rooms, much to Mary's chagrin. Five months later, shortly after the marriage talks with Tuscany collapsed, the Queen's mother, Duchess Laura, died. Therefore, the whole English court went into mourning. Duchess Laura left Mary "a considerable sum of cash" and some jewellery. William III of Orange, James's nephew and son-in-law, sensed popular discontent with James's government; he used the death of Mary's mother as a guise to send his cousin Count Zuylestein, to England, ostensibly to condole the Queen, but in reality as a spy.

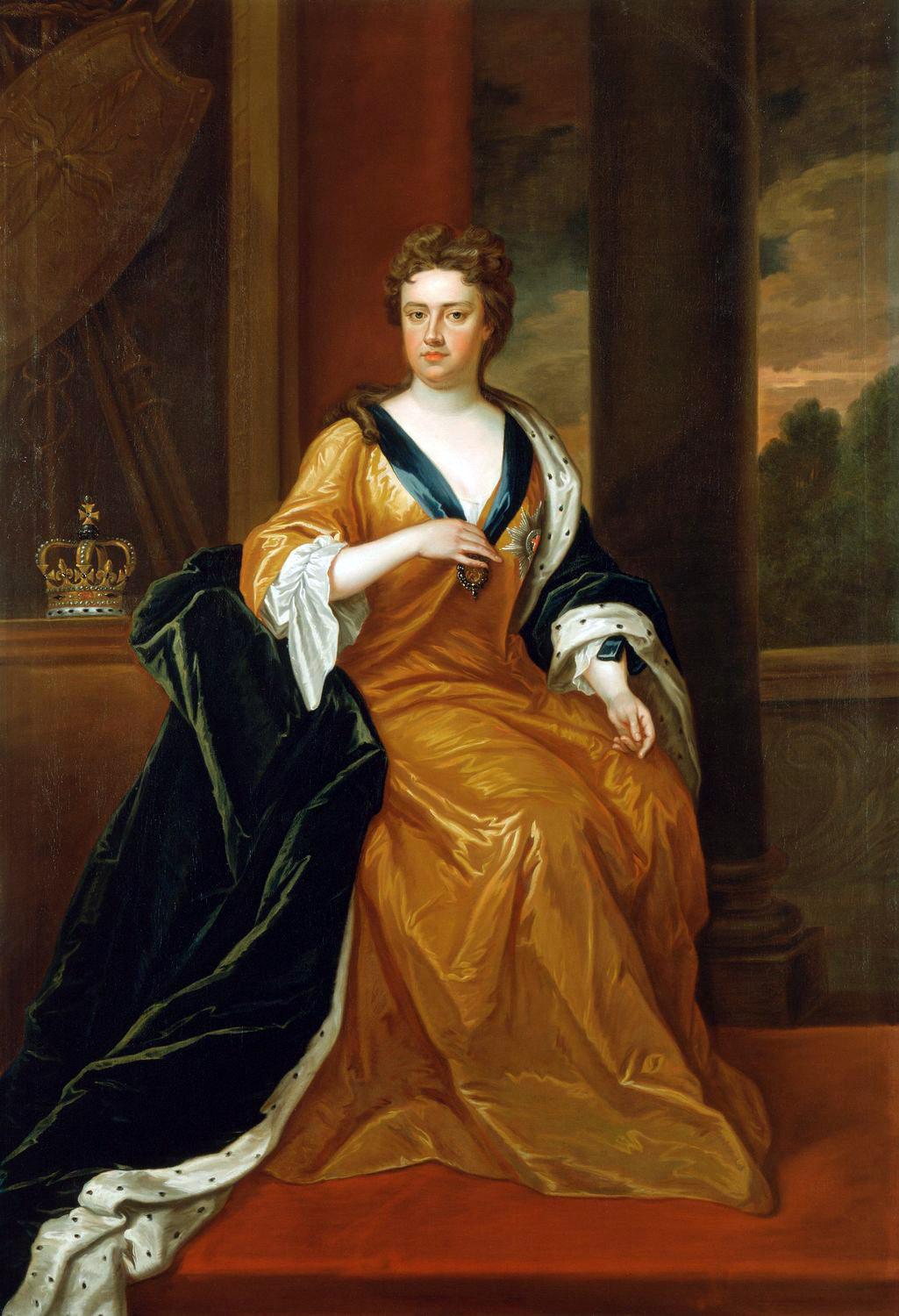
Queen Anne of Great Britain in a painting by Charles Jervas

Having visited Bath, in the hope its waters would aid conception, Queen Mary became pregnant in late 1687. When the pregnancy became public knowledge shortly before Christmas, Catholics rejoiced. Protestants, who had tolerated James's Catholic government because he had no Catholic heir, were concerned. The Protestant disillusion came to a head after the child was known to be male, and many Protestants believed the child was spurious; if not, James II's Catholic dynasty would have been perpetuated. Popular opinion alleged that the child, named James Francis Edward Stuart, was smuggled into the birth chamber as a substitute for the Queen's real but stillborn child. This rumour was widely accepted as fact by Protestants, despite the many witnesses of the birth. Mainly by mismanagement on James's part, these rumours had some excuse as from personal prejudice he had excluded many from the ceremony whose testimony must have been counted valid; most of the witnesses were Catholics or foreigners, and several, such as his daughter Anne and the Protestant prelates, or the maternal relatives of his daughters, whom the new birth would remove from the direct succession, were not present.

Anne and her elder sister, Mary, still suspected that their father had thrust a changeling upon the nation. Count Zuylestein, returning to the Netherlands shortly after the birth, agreed with Anne's findings.

Issued by seven leading Whig nobles, the invitation for William to invade England signalled the beginning of a revolution that culminated in James's deposition. The invitation assured William that "nineteen parts of twenty of the people throughout the kingdom" wished for an intervention. The revolution, known as the Glorious Revolution, deprived James Francis Edward of his right to the English throne, on the grounds that he was not deemed the King's real son, and later because he was a Catholic. With England in the hands of William of Orange's 15,000-strong army, James and Mary decided to go into exile in France. On 9 December 1688, Mary left London in disguise with the infant Prince of Wales and in the company of Victoria Davia-Montecuculi, under the arrangement of Antoine Nompar de Caumont. After arriving in France through Calais, she was joined by James a few weeks later. There, they stayed at the expense of James's first cousin King Louis XIV, who supported the Jacobite cause.

== Queen over the water (1688–1701) ==
=== Reception at Louis XIV's court ===
Louis XIV in a portrait by Hyacinthe Rigaud, 1701

James was formally deposed on 11 December 1688 OS in England and on 11 May 1689 OS in Scotland, and his daughter Mary II and her husband, William III, were made joint monarchs. James, however, backed by Louis XIV of France, still considered himself king by divine right, and maintained it was not within parliament's prerogative to depose a monarch. Louis gave the exiled royal couple the use of Château de Saint-Germain-en-Laye, where they set up a court-in-exile.

Mary quickly became a popular fixture at Louis XIV's court at Versailles, where diarist Madame de Sévigné acclaimed Mary for her "distinguished bearing and her quick wit". Questions of precedence, however, marred Mary's relations with Louis's daughter-in-law, Maria Anna Victoria of Bavaria. Because Mary was accorded the privileges and rank of a queen, Maria Anna was outranked by her. Therefore, Maria Anna refused to see Mary, etiquette being a sensitive issue at Versailles. In spite of this, Louis and his secret wife, Madame de Maintenon, became close friends with Mary. As there was no queen at the French court, nor a dauphine after Maria Anna's death in 1690, Mary took precedence over all the female members of the French court and French royal house, as did her daughter in her capacity of a royal princess until the next French dauphine appeared in 1711. James was largely excluded from French court life. His contemporaries found him boring, and French courtiers frequently joked that "when one talks to him, one understands why he is here." Mary gave birth to a daughter, Louise Mary, in 1692. She was to be James and Mary's last child.

Initially supported by Irish Catholics in his effort to regain the thrones, James launched an expedition to Ireland in March 1689. He abandoned it upon his defeat at the Battle of the Boyne in 1690. During James's campaign, Mary supported his cause throughout the British Isles: she sent three French supply ships to Bantry Bay and £2,000 to Jacobite rebels in Dundee. She financed those measures by selling her jewellery. Money problems plagued the Stuart court-in-exile, despite a substantial pension from Louis XIV of 50,000 livres. Mary tried her best to assist those of her husband's followers living in poverty, and encouraged her children to give part of their pocket money to Jacobite refugees.

=== Estensi succession ===
The collapse of James's invasion of Ireland in 1691 upset Mary. Her spirits were lifted by news of the marriage of her brother, the Duke of Modena, to Margherita Maria Farnese of Parma. When, in 1695, Mary's brother died, the House of Este was left with one progenitor, their uncle Cardinal-Duke Rinaldo. Queen Mary, concerned for the dynasty's future, urged the Cardinal-Duke to resign his cardinalate, "for the good of the people and for the perpetuation of the sovereign house of Este". Rinaldo's bride, Princess Charlotte Felicitas of Brunswick-Lüneburg, was, according to Mary, "of an easy disposition best suited to [the Duke]".

A bone of contention, however, arose over the Queen's inheritance and dowry. Duke Rinaldo refused to release the former, and left the latter £15,000 in arrears. In 1700, five years later, Rinaldo finally paid Mary her dowry; her inheritance, however, remained sequestered, and relations with Modena worsened again when Rinaldo allied himself with Holy Roman Emperor Leopold I. Leopold was an enemy of Louis XIV.

== Regency (1701–1704) ==
Mary's coat of arms as Queen of England. Depicting the royal coat of arms of England, Scotland and Ireland impaled with a minor version of her father's arms as Duke of Modena. In light of religious sentiment at the time, it was presumed unwise to reproduce her father's arms in full, since the quarterings are divided by a "Pale Gules charged with the Papal keys ensigned with the Tiara".

In March 1701, James suffered a stroke while hearing mass at the Château de Saint-Germain-en-Laye, leaving him partially paralysed. Fagon, Louis XIV's personal physician, recommended the waters of Bourbon-l'Archambault, to cure James's paralysis. The waters, however, had little effect, and James died of a seizure on 16 September 1701. Louis, contravening the Peace of Ryswick and irritating William, declared James Francis Edward King of England, Ireland and Scotland as James III and VIII. Mary acted as nominal regent for her minor son. She presided over his regency council, too, although she was uninterested in politics. Before his death, James II expressed his wish that Mary's regency would last no longer than their son's 18th birthday.

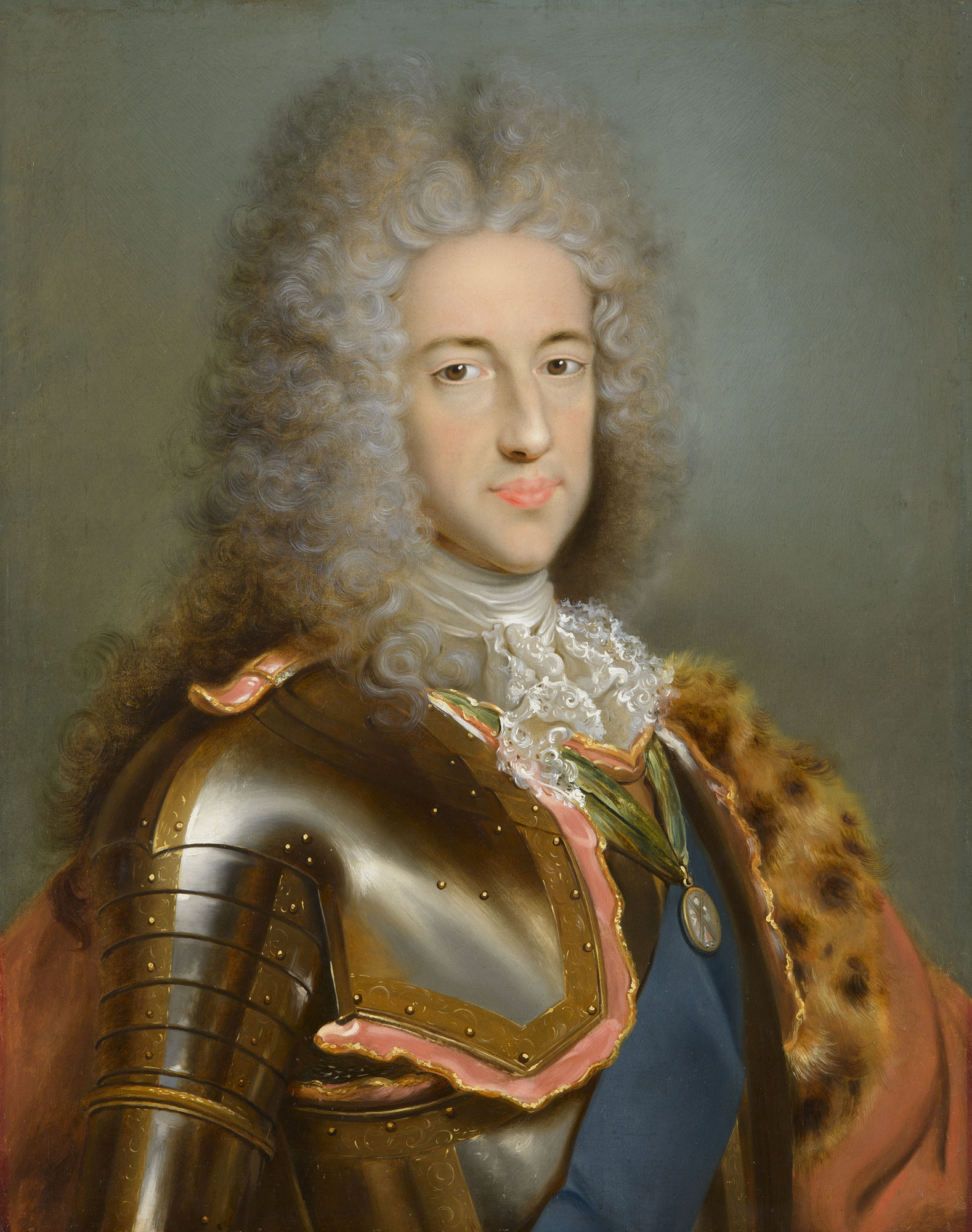
James Francis Edward Stuart, Mary's only surviving son, in a portrait by Antonio David

Dressed in mourning for the remainder of her life, Mary's first act as regent was to disseminate a manifesto, outlining James Francis Edward's claims. It was largely ignored in England. In Scotland, however, the confederate Lords sent Lord Belhaven to Saint-Germain, to convince the Queen to surrender to them custody of James Francis Edward and accede to his conversion to Protestantism. The conversion, said Belhaven, would enable his accession to the English throne upon William's death. Mary was not swayed by Belhaven's argument, so a compromise was reached: James Francis Edward, if he became king, would limit the number of Catholic priests in England and promise not to tamper with the established Church of England. In exchange, the confederate Lords would do all in their power to block the passing of the Hanoverian succession in Scottish parliament. When, in March 1702, William died, Lord Lovat declared for James Francis Edward at Inverness. Soon after, Lovat travelled to the court-in-exile at Saint-Germain, and begged Mary to allow her son to come to Scotland. Lovat intended to raise an army of 15,000 soldiers in Scotland to seize the throne for James Francis Edward. Mary refused to part with James Francis Edward, and the rising failed. Mary's regency ceased with her son's reaching of the age of 16.

== Later life ==
Having wished to become a nun in her youth, Mary sought refuge from the stresses of exile at the Convent of the Visitandines, Chaillot, near Paris, where she befriended Louis's penitent mistress, Louise de La Vallière. There, Mary stayed with her daughter for long periods almost every summer. It was here, too, in 1711, that Mary found out that, as part of the embryonic Treaty of Utrecht, James Francis Edward was to lose Louis's explicit recognition and be forced to leave France. The next year, when James Francis Edward was expelled and Louise Mary died of smallpox, Mary was very upset; according to Mary's close friend Madame de Maintenon, Mary was "a model of desolation". Deprived of the company of her family, Mary lived out the rest of her days at Chaillot and Saint-Germain in virtual poverty, unable to travel by her own means because all her horses had died and she could not afford to replace them.

Following her death from cancer on 7 May 1718, Mary was remembered fondly by her French contemporaries, three of whom, Elizabeth Charlotte of the Palatinate, the Duke of Saint-Simon and the Marquis of Dangeau, deemed her a "saint". Mary's remains were interred in Chaillot among the nuns she had befriended.

== Issue ==
Name	Birth	Death	Notes
Unnamed child	March or May 1674		stillbirth
Catherine Laura	10 January 1675	3 October 1675	died of convulsions
Unnamed child	October 1675		stillbirth
Isabel (or Isabella)	28 August 1676	2 or 4 March 1681	buried in Westminster Abbey on 4 March (Old Style) as "The Lady Isabella, daughter to the Duke of York"
Charles, Duke of Cambridge	7 November 1677	12 December 1677	died of smallpox
Elizabeth	c. 1678		
Unnamed child	February 1681		stillbirth
Charlotte Maria	16 August 1682	16 October 1682	died of convulsions and buried in Westminster Abbey on 8 October (Old Style) as "The Lady Charlotte-Marie, daughter to the Duke of York"
Unnamed child	October 1683		stillbirth
Unnamed child	May 1684		stillbirth
James, Prince of Wales "the Old Pretender"	10 June 1688	1 January 1766	married 1719, Clementina Sobieska; had issue
Louisa Maria Teresa	28 June 1692	18 April 1712	died of smallpox

== Ancestry ==
Ancestors of Mary of Modena

8. Alfonso III d'Este
4. Francesco I d'Este
9. Isabella of Savoy
2. Alfonso IV d'Este
10. Ranuccio I Farnese, Duke of Parma
5. Maria Caterina Farnese of Parma
11. Margherita Aldobrandini
1. Mary of Modena
12. Vincenzo Martinozzi
6. Hieronymus Martinozzi
13. Margherita Marcolini
3. Laura Martinozzi
14. Pietro Mazzarini
7. Laura Mazarini
15. Ortensia Buffalini

== Notes ==
Mary of Modena House of Este Born: 5 October 1658 Died: 7 May 1718
British royalty
Preceded by Catherine of Braganza	Queen consort of England, Scotland and Ireland; 1685–1688	Vacant Title next held by Prince George of Denmark as consort
Titles in pretence
Glorious Revolution	— TITULAR — Queen consort of England, Scotland and Ireland; 1688–1701	Vacant Title next held by Maria Clementina Sobieska
