= Warming-pan scandal =

1688 royal birth scandal in England

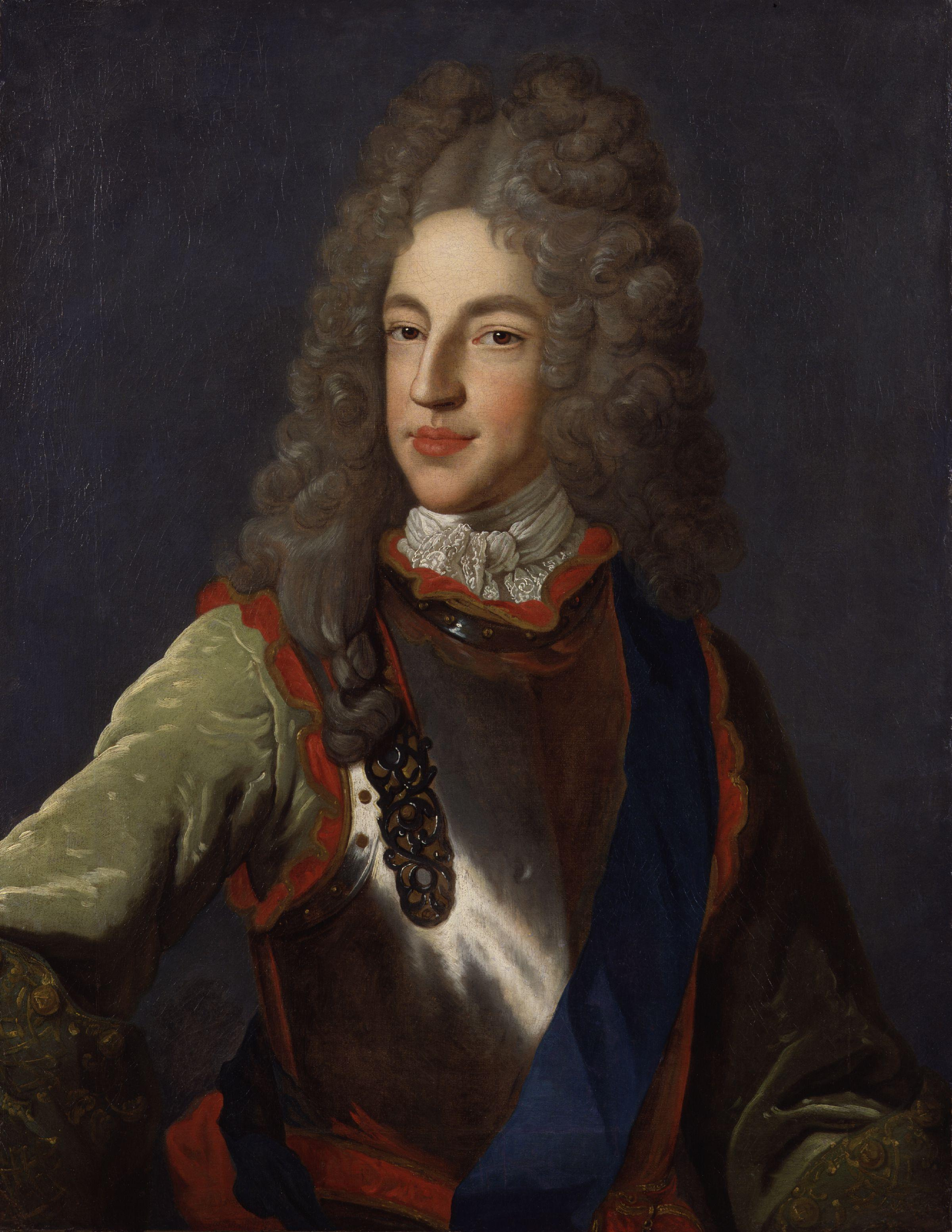
James Francis Edward Stuart

The warming-pan scandal centered on the 1688 birth of James Francis Edward Stuart, the Catholic son of England's then-king and queen James II and Mary of Modena. From early in Mary of Modena's pregnancy to well after the prince's birth, suspicions spread, especially among English Protestants, that the baby was not the real child of James II and Mary of Modena.

One of these rumors was that, rather than Mary of Modena actually giving birth to the prince, another baby had been brought into the birthing chamber in a warming-pan and was then presented as the heir. This became known as the "warming-pan scandal" and was one of many stories of a false birth. James II responded to these rumors by calling a meeting at Whitehall, where 42 witnesses testified that they had seen the prince's birth. However, the scandal (among other factors) eventually led to the invasion of England by Dutch prince William of Orange, the husband of James II's eldest Protestant daughter Mary. Thus, James II and Mary of Modena were exiled in the Glorious Revolution.

The scandal surrounding James Francis Edward Stuart's birth reflected a variety of ideologies in England at the time. Politics, religion, and gender all played a role in the perpetuation of these false birth stories, which continued to circulate until 1745 or so.

== Birth of James Francis Edward Stuart ==
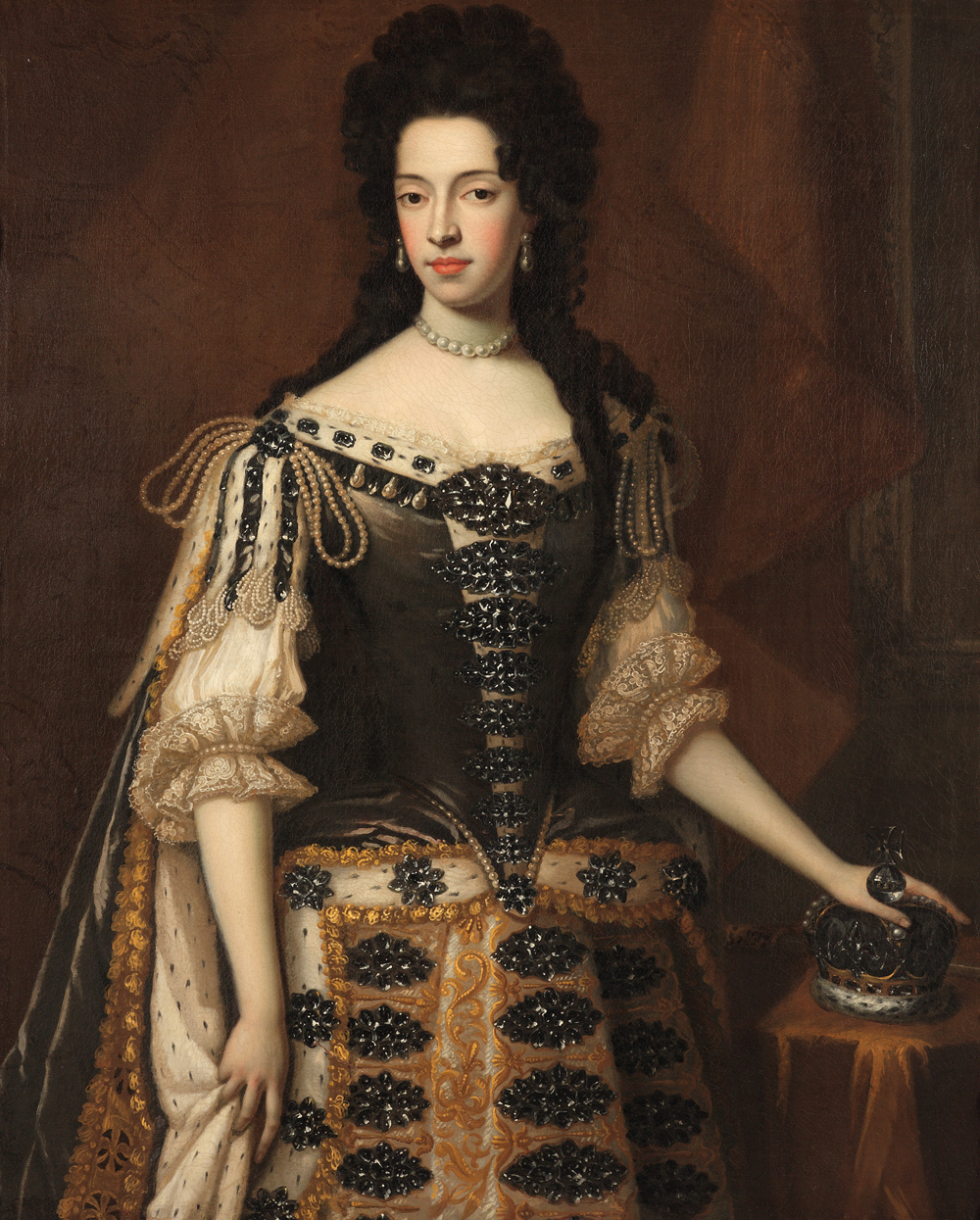
Mary of Modena, Queen of England from 1685 to 1688

In late 1687, Mary of Modena, the Catholic second wife of King James II and Queen of England, announced her pregnancy. James II already had two daughters from a previous marriage: Mary of Orange and Anne, both of whom were Protestants. James II and Mary of Modena on the other hand were Catholics. Mary had several pregnancies during her marriage to James II prior to 1687, but all of them ended in miscarriage or early child death after birth.

During her 1687 pregnancy, Mary refused to do many of the things expected of pregnant women to confirm the pregnancy, such as making "her belly, her bed linen, and her breasts available for inspection." This sparked concerns among Protestants that Mary might be faking her pregnancy. Nevertheless, James II and Mary of Modena's son James Francis Edward Stuart was allegedly born the morning of 10 June 1688.

== Warming-pan scandal and suspicions surrounding birth ==
Mary of Modena's 1687-1688 pregnancy and the prince's birth were surrounded by constant rumors and suspicion. Because both of James II's older daughters were Protestants, there was significant pressure on James II and Mary to produce a male heir in order to continue the Catholic line of succession. Thus, when Mary really did give birth to a boy in 1688, many questioned whether the birth was a "miracle," as the Catholics claimed, or evidence of a conspiracy, as the Protestants claimed.

During the birth, Mary of Modena told her midwife and others in the birthing chamber that she was cold. Thus, to warm the bed, a pan filled with hot coals ("warming-pan") was brought in. This sparked rumors that the baby, James Francis Edward Stuart, had been brought into the birthing chamber inside this pan, forming the basis of the warming-pan scandal.

In addition, while Mary's unwillingness to allow her body to be examined fueled suspicions that she was faking the pregnancy, rumors of a false baby continued after the prince was born as well. Soon after birth, James Francis Edward Stuart became sick and rumors began that he had died and been swapped with another baby.

Disbelief in the prince was not only held by those outside the family but also James II's own daughters. Throughout the queen's pregnancy, Anne wrote letters to her sister Mary of Orange questioning whether Mary of Modena really was pregnant. Furthermore, Anne was away when Mary of Modena gave birth to James Francis Edward Stuart, which prevented her from witnessing the birth in person. She later wrote to her sister that she was "'so unfortunate to be out of town when the Queen was brought to bed, for I shall never now be satisfied whether the child be true or false.'"

== Whitehall Meeting and the Glorious Revolution ==
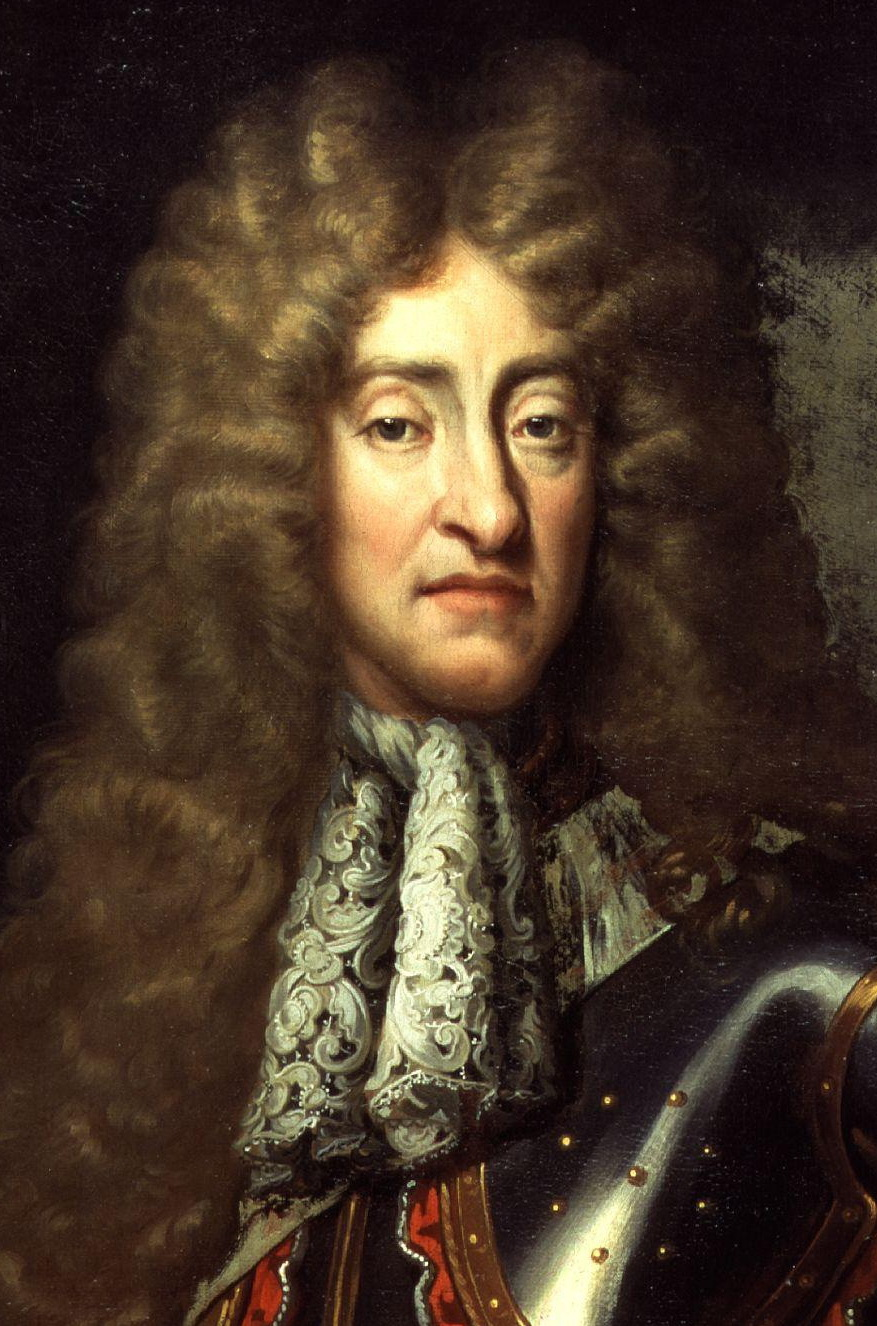
James II, King of England from 1685 to 1688

These rumors grew to the point where Anne wrote in a letter to her sister: "'tis possible it may be her child; but where one believes it, a thousand do not.'" Because James Francis Edward Stuart was a male, his birth meant he would be first in line to inherit the throne before James II's eldest Protestant daughter Mary of Orange. Eventually, William of Orange, a Dutch prince and Mary of Orange's husband, declared an invasion on England in part in response to these rumors, citing his suspicions that "'the Pretend Prince of Wales was not born of the Queen.'"

In response to these attacks, James II held a meeting at Whitehall on October 22nd, 1688. At this meeting, 42 people who had been present at the birth testified that James Francis Edward Stuart really was the son of Mary of Modena and James II. Some sources claim that these testimonies were very convincing to all who heard them. On the other hand, other sources argue that these testimonies provided even more material for the rumors that surrounded James Francis Edward Stuart's birth.

Regardless, the meeting was not enough to stop William from invading England. In November of 1688, William of Orange began his invasion and he and his wife (Mary, James II's daughter) took over the British throne, exiling James II and Mary of Modena in what was called the Glorious Revolution.

== Ideologies in the false birth rhetoric ==
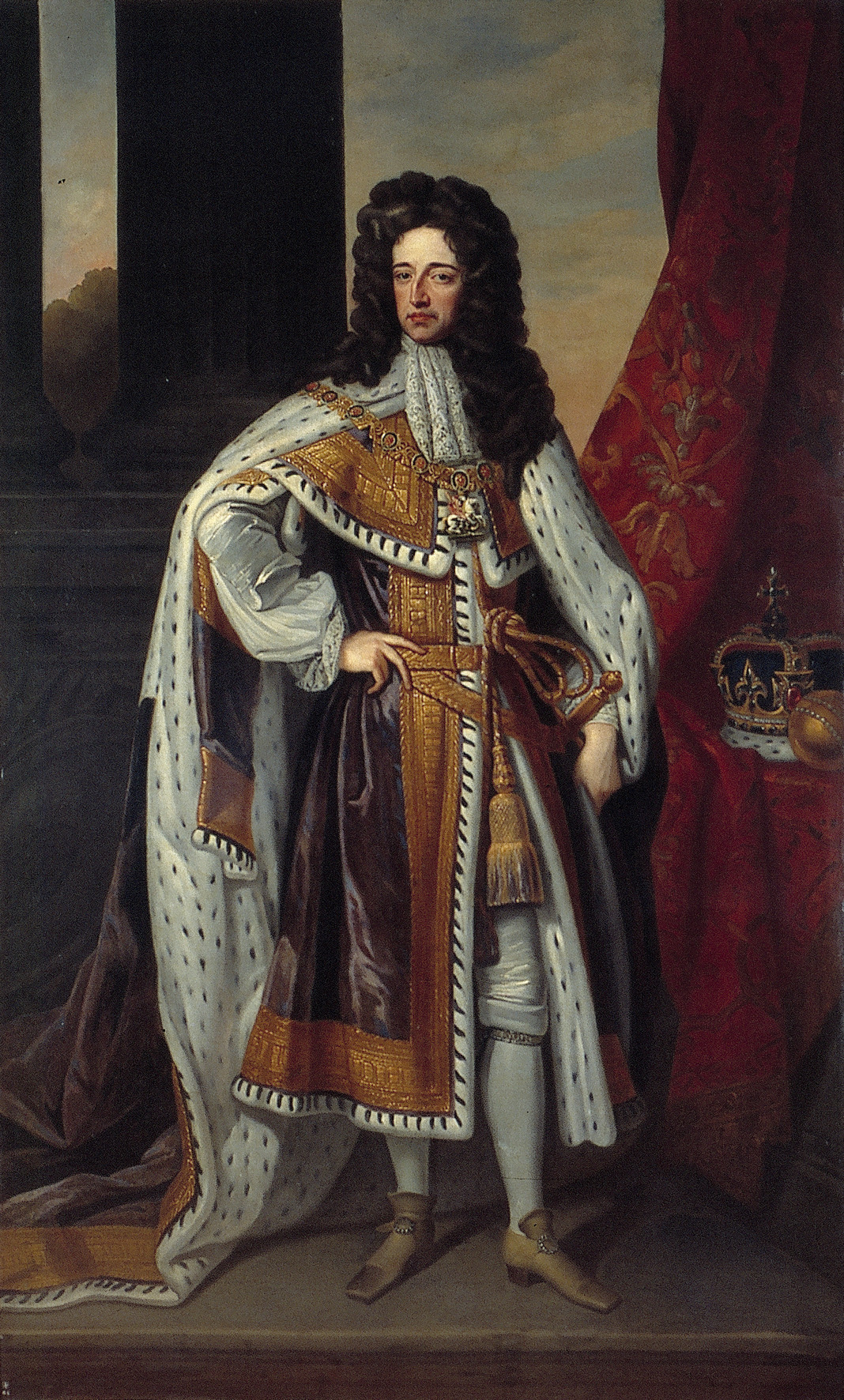
William of Orange, King of England from 1689 to 1702

=== Politics ===
Especially in relation to William's invasion, the perpetuation of rumors surrounding James Francis Edward Stuart's birth can be attributed in part to political motives, as the scandal "provided [William] with an excuse to invade England in defense of the hereditary right of his wife." This is also supported by messages from William's agent James Johnstone, who encouraged William to sponsor a pamphlet in secret that fueled these birth rumors. Thus, whether or not William really believed that the baby was not the true son of James II and Mary of Modena, William of Orange "was happy for others to think that he did."

=== Religion ===
In addition to political strategies, the warming-pan scandal also involved conflicts over religion, as James II and Mary of Modena were Catholic leaders in a predominantly Protestant England. For example, anti-Catholicism played a role in the rhetoric surrounding the birth, with rumors that James Francis Edward Stuart was the product of an affair between Mary of Modena and Ferdinand D'Adda, a Catholic priest. Catholicism was associated strongly with ignorance and deception by Protestant detractors, which meant that details like the queen being covered during birth were suggested as "secrecy" on the part of Catholics rather than genuine attempts at modesty by the queen.

=== Gender ===
Much like the religious sentiments, gender also played a role in what testimonies or ideologies were believed. For one, differing ideas about "what constituted adequate evidence" made the burden of proof of the prince's birth much more difficult. However, while authors of warming-pan scandal rhetoric attempted to exclude witness testimonies based on perceived allegiance to the king, they did not necessarily dismiss witnesses on the basis of sex. Thus, evidence from noble Protestant (but not necessarily Catholic) women would have been valued in these circumstances. Women were understood to have more knowledge of childbirth, which made them better suited to be reliable witnesses to the queen's birth.

However, at the same time, some women like Mary of Modena were under extreme scrutiny and suspicion throughout the scandal. Additionally, although women's testimonies were valued at least in part during this era, stronger evidence came from the belief in "paternal instinct": James II would not allow James Francis Edward Stuart to inherit the throne before his biological daughter Mary of Orange if the prince was not truly his son.

=== Burden of proof and uncertainty ===
Central to the warming-pan scandal as a whole were gaps in knowledge and an overall lack of concrete and agreed-upon evidence surrounding the prince's birth. The burden of proof was placed "on those who said the birth was real rather than on those who said it was false." Thus, a perceived lack of evidence of the birth was equated with proof that the baby was false. However, legitimizing the birth was not a straightfoward task. Thus, those who believed in the prince's birth affirmed their position by arguing that proof of any birth was impossible and thus some level of uncertainty would be unavoidable.

== Sources ==
- Weil, Rachel Judith (1999). "The politics of legitimacy: women and the warming-pan scandal". Political Passions: Gender, the Family, and Political Argument in England, 1680–1714. Manchester University Press. pp. 86–104. ISBN 978-0-7190-5622-2.
