= James Francis Edward Stuart =

Jacobite pretender (1688–1766)

- Prince of Wales
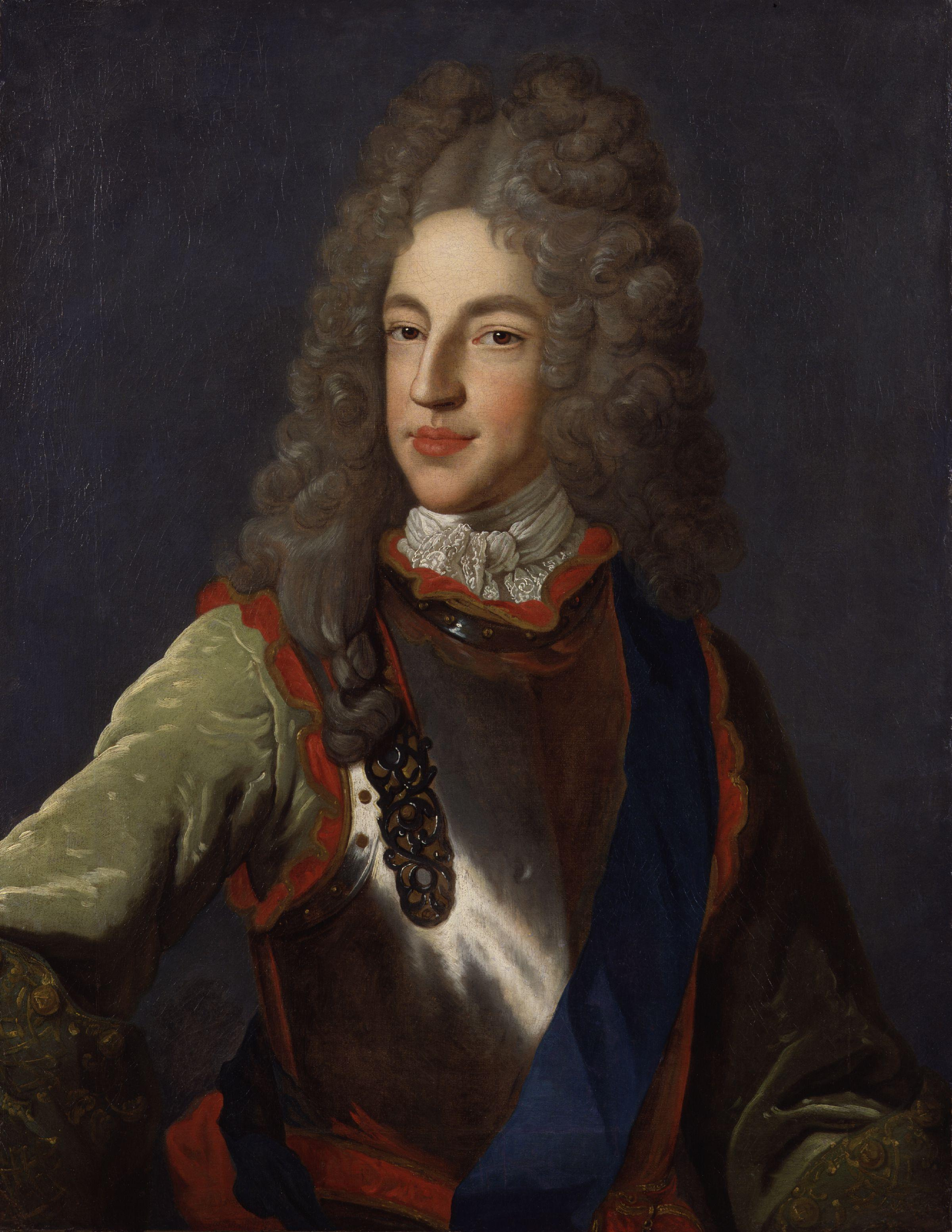
- Portrait from the studio of Alexis Simon Belle, c. 1712

Jacobite pretender
- Pretendence: 16 September 1701 – 1 January 1766
- Predecessor: James VII and II
- Successor: "Charles III"
- Born: 10/20 June 1688 (O.S./N.S.); St. James's Palace, London, England
- Died: 1 January 1766 (aged 77); Palazzo Muti, Rome, Papal States
- Burial: St. Peter's Basilica, Vatican City
- Spouse: Maria Clementina Sobieska (m. 1719; died 1735)
- Issue: Charles Edward Stuart; Henry Benedict Stuart
- House: Stuart
- Father: James II of England
- Mother: Mary of Modena
- Religion: Roman Catholicism

James Francis Edward Stuart (10 June 1688 – 1 January 1766), also known as the Old Pretender and the Chevalier de St. George, was the senior House of Stuart claimant to the thrones of England, Ireland and Scotland from 1701 until his death in 1766. The only surviving son of James II of England and his second wife, Mary of Modena, he was created Prince of Wales. He was heir apparent until his Catholic father was deposed and exiled in the Glorious Revolution of 1688. His Protestant half-sister Mary II and her husband William III and II became co-monarchs. As a Catholic, he was subsequently excluded from the succession by the Bill of Rights 1689.

He claimed the thrones of England, Ireland and Scotland on the death of his father, in September 1701. As part of the War of the Spanish Succession, Louis XIV of France backed a planned invasion of Scotland in 1708 on his behalf, which failed, as did additional attempts in the Jacobite rising of 1715 and Jacobite rising of 1719; after these failed attempts, James lived quietly in Rome. The last serious effort to restore the Stuart line, the Jacobite rising of 1745, was led by James's elder son, Charles Edward Stuart; begun in August 1745, it also met with failure in April 1746, effectively ending further attempts to regain the British throne for the exiled House of Stuart.

== Birth and childhood ==
James Francis Edward Stuart was born on 10 June 1688, at St. James's Palace, the only surviving son of James II of England and his second wife, Mary of Modena, both of them Catholics. As the king's eldest surviving son, he was automatically Duke of Cornwall and Duke of Rothesay from birth, and he was created Prince of Wales in July 1688.

His birth was unexpected, as it came five years after his mother's tenth pregnancy; none of the infants had survived more than a few days. The birth reignited controversies of religion, because the new prince would be raised a Catholic. Rumours spread among Anglicans that the child had died stillborn and that the baby presented as the new prince was an impostor smuggled into the royal birth chamber in a warming pan. Some Protestants found it suspicious that everyone attending the birth was supposedly Catholic, although the Protestant Lady Belasyse testified that she "saw the child taken out of the bed with the navel string hanging to its belly". Another rumour was that James II had not been the father; he was said to be impotent after a bout with venereal disease years earlier. To counter the rumours, James published the testimonies of over seventy witnesses to the birth, taken before the Privy Council on 22 October 1688.

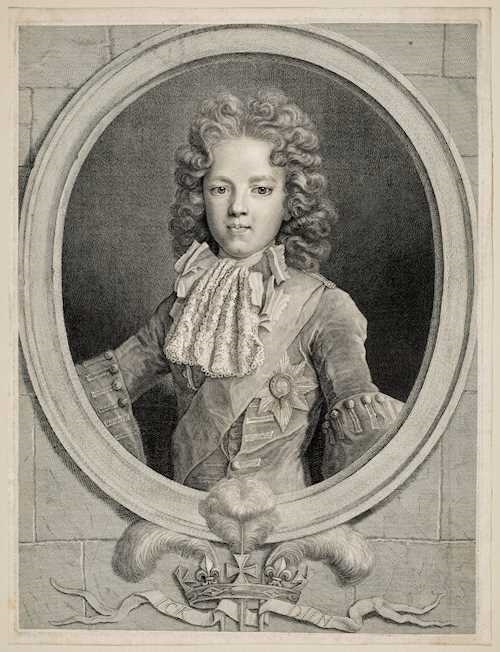
James Francis Edward as Prince of Wales

The line of succession to the throne was thrust into doubt. James II's legitimate daughters, Mary and Anne, had been raised as Protestants. British Protestants had expected Mary, from James II's first marriage, to succeed their father. This possibility had kept Protestants reasonably content, with his reign a temporary inconvenience. Now that Mary or Anne's succession was in doubt with this new Catholic son and heir, discontent grew, already stoked by James II's actions which had alienated Tory Anglicans who had previously been inclined to honour him as sovereign even if they differed in religion. This movement would become the Glorious Revolution; Mary's husband William of Orange landed in England, backed by an army of English and Scottish exiles, as well as Dutch soldiers. Much of the English army promptly defected to William's cause, causing James II and his family to flee rather than stay and fight. In November 1688, James II ordered Lord Dover to escort his heir out of the country to France, and James was taken to Portsmouth. The plan was foiled when Lord Dartmouth refused to prepare a boat to evacuate Dover and the prince, and James was brought back to London.

On 9 December, Mary of Modena disguised herself as a laundress and escaped with the infant James to France. He was there brought up at the Château de Saint-Germain-en-Laye, which Louis XIV had turned over to the exiled James II. Both the ex-king and his family were held in great consideration by the French king (who was his first cousin through his mother Henrietta Maria), and they were frequent visitors at Versailles where Louis XIV and his court treated them as ruling monarchs. In June 1692 James's sister Louisa Maria was born. He later received a military education overseen by Richard Hamilton and Dominic Sheldon, two veterans of the Irish Army. When he was dying in 1701, James's father implored James to never give up his Catholic faith.

== Struggle for the throne ==
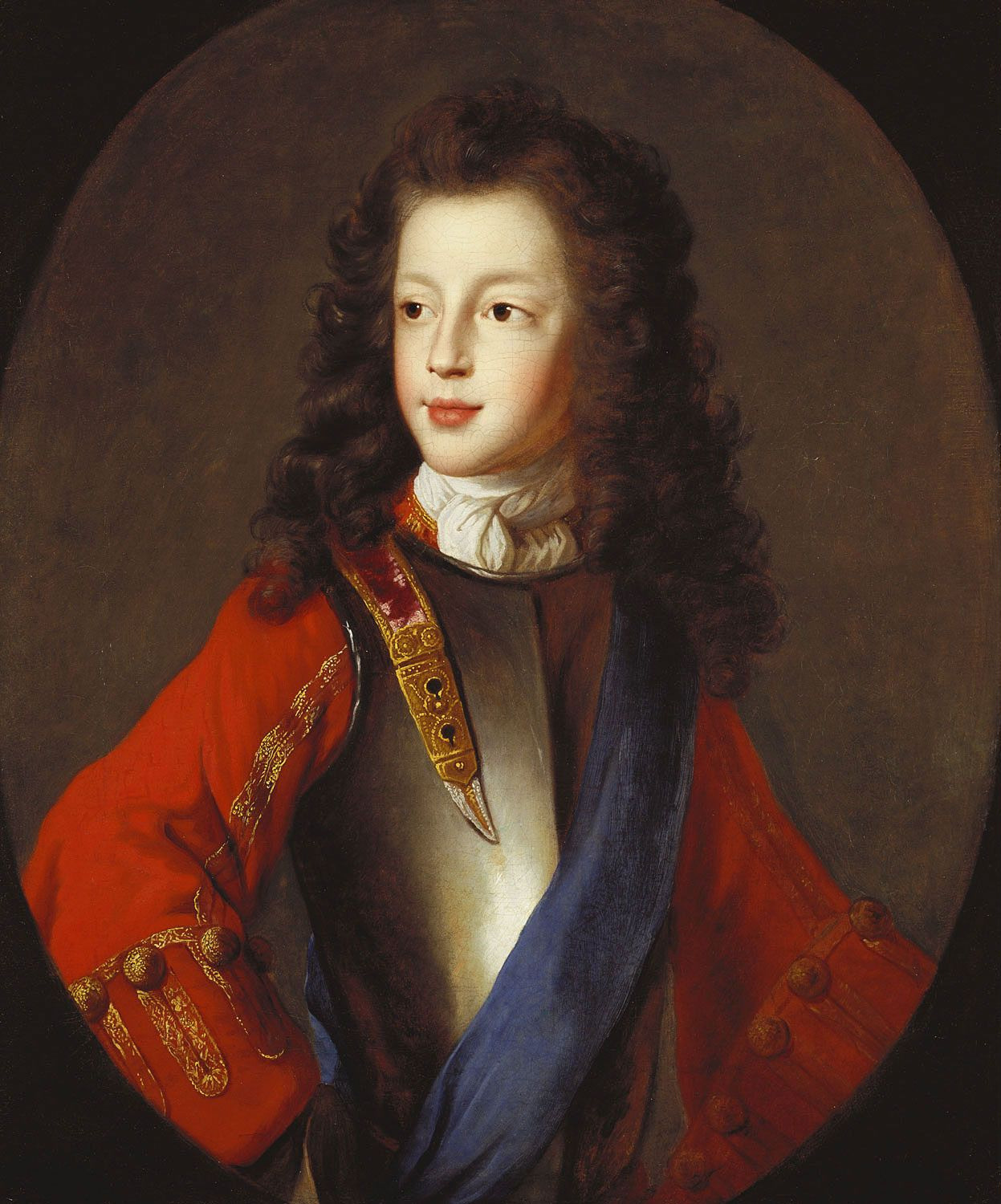
James Francis Edward c. 1703, portrait in the Royal Collection attributed to Alexis Simon Belle

On his father's death in 1701, James was proclaimed as rightful king by Louis XIV of France, despite having previously recognised the legitimacy of William III and II under the 1697 Treaty of Ryswick. Spain, the Papal States, and Modena also recognised him as king of England, Ireland and Scotland and refused to recognise William III and II, Mary II, or Anne as legitimate sovereigns. As a result of his claiming his father's lost thrones, James was attainted for treason in London on 2 March 1702, and his titles were forfeited under English law.

=== Early attempts ===
Though delayed in France by an attack of measles, James attempted invasion, trying to land at the Firth of Forth on 23 March 1708. The fleet of Admiral Sir George Byng intercepted the French ships, which, combined with bad weather, prevented a landing.

James served for a time as a volunteer in the French army, as his father had done during the interregnum. During this time, James served under both the Duke of Burgundy and the Duke of Vendôme in the War of the Spanish Succession. He was noted for his valour during the Battle of Oudenarde, where he stayed at the head of army until the French were forced to retire. He also served during the Siege of Lille. During a bout of malaria in Cambrai, James met François Fénelon, and was greatly influence by Fénelon's concept of Quietism, a philosophy he would adhere to in some form for most of his life.

Between August and September 1710, Queen Anne appointed a new Tory administration led by Robert Harley, who entered into a secret correspondence with de Torcy, the French Minister of Foreign Affairs, in which he claimed to desire James's accession to the throne should James convert to Protestantism. A year later, however, the British government pushed for James's expulsion from France as a precondition for a peace treaty with France. In accordance with the Treaty of Utrecht (1713), Harley and Lord Bolingbroke, the Secretary of State, colluded with the French in exiling James to the Duchy of Lorraine.

Queen Anne became severely ill at Christmas 1713 and seemed close to death. In January 1714, she recovered but clearly had little time to live. Through de Torcy and his London agent, Abbé François Gaultier, Harley maintained the correspondence with James and Bolingbroke entered into a separate correspondence with him. They both stated to James that his conversion to Protestantism would facilitate his accession. However, James, a devout Catholic, replied to Torcy: "I have chosen my own course, therefore it is for others to change their sentiments." In March came James's refusal to convert, following which Harley and Bolingbroke reached the opinion that James's accession was not feasible, though they maintained their correspondence with him.

As a result, in August 1714, George, Elector of Hanover, a German-speaking Lutheran as George I. James and George were both great-grandsons of James VI and I, making them second cousins. James denounced him, noting "we have beheld a foreign family, aliens to our country, distant in blood, and strangers even to our language, ascend the throne". Following George's coronation in October 1714, major riots broke out in provincial England.

=== The Fifteen ===
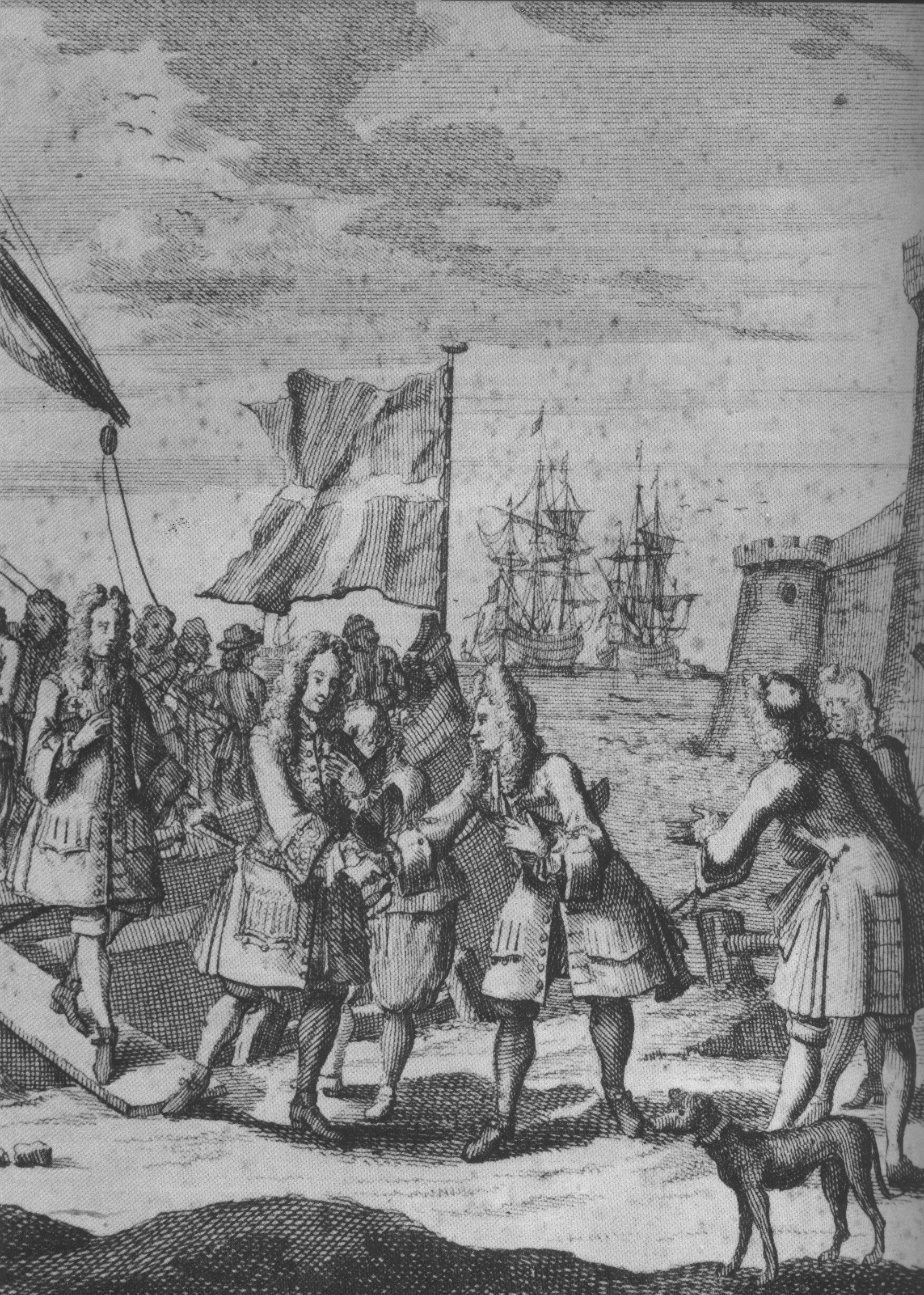
James ("The Old Pretender") lands in Scotland after Sheriffmuir. An 18th-century engraving.

In the following year, James's supporters, known as Jacobites, started uprisings in Scotland and Cornwall aimed at putting "James III and VIII" on the throne. On 22 December 1715, James reached Scotland after the Jacobite defeats at the Battle of Sheriffmuir (13 November 1715) and Battle of Preston (1715). He landed at Peterhead and soon fell ill with fever, his illness made more severe by the icy Scottish winter. In January 1716, he set up court at Scone Palace. Reputedly Jane Stuart, a half-sister, came from Wisbech in England to visit him. Learning of the approach of government forces, he returned to France, sailing from Montrose on 5 February 1716. The abandonment of his rebel allies caused ill-feeling against him in Scotland; nor was he welcomed on his return to France. His patron, Louis XIV, had died on 1 September 1715, and the French government found him a political embarrassment. When France, hitherto his main protector, allied with Britain, this effectively secured the Hanoverian dynasty's monarchy over the Kingdom of Great Britain.

== Court-in-exile ==
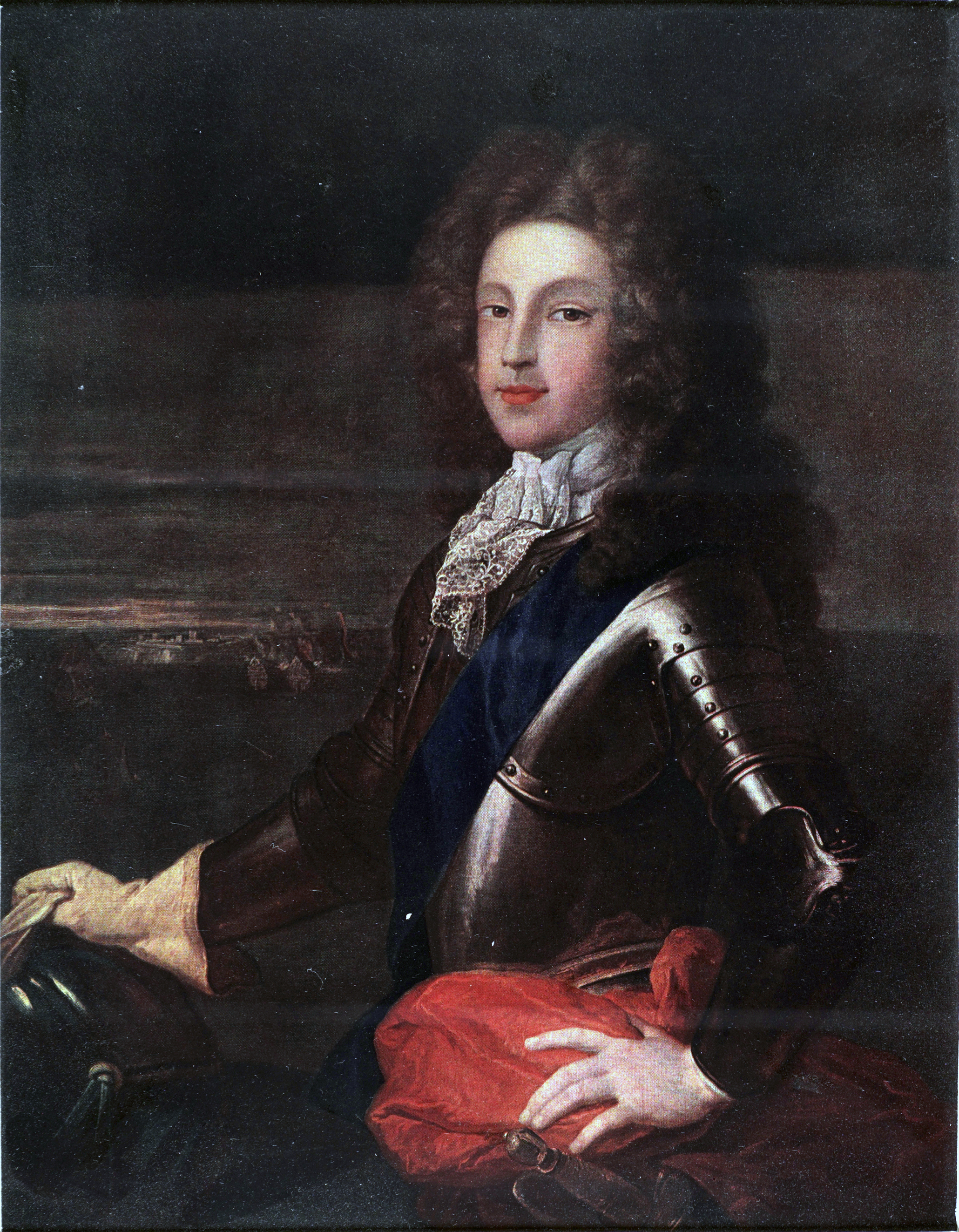
Coloured portrait of James as young man

After the unsuccessful invasion of 1715, James lived in Papal territory, first at Avignon (April 1716 – February 1717), then at Pesaro (1717) and Urbino (July 1717 – November 1718). Pope Clement XI offered James the Palazzo Muti or Palazzo del Re in Rome as his residence, which he accepted. Pope Innocent XIII, like his predecessor, showed much support. Thanks to his friend Cardinal Filippo Antonio Gualterio, James was granted a life annuity of 12,000 Roman scudi. Such help enabled him to organise a Jacobite court at Rome, where, although he lived in splendour, he continued to suffer from fits of melancholy.

Further efforts to restore the Stuarts to the British throne were planned. In 1719 a major expedition left Spain but was forced to turn back due to weather. A small landing took place in the Scottish Highlands, but the Jacobite rising of 1719 was defeated at the Battle of Glen Shiel. James had gone to Spain in the hope he could take part in the invasion, but following its abandonment was forced to return to Italy. A further attempt was planned in 1722, but following the exposure of the Atterbury Plot it came to nothing.

In exercise of his pretended position, James purported to create titles of nobility, referred to as Jacobite peerages, for his British supporters and members of his court, none of which have ever been recognised in Britain.

The court-in-exile became a popular stop for English travellers making a Grand Tour, regardless of political affiliation. For many, it functioned as an unofficial consulate. Those in need of medical attention preferred being treated by one of their own countrymen. In 1735 court physicians tended to Edmund Sheffield, 2nd Duke of Buckingham and Normanby, and thirty years later to James Boswell.

James remained well-treated in Rome until his death. He was allowed to hold Protestant services at Court, and was given land where his Protestant adherents could receive a public burial.

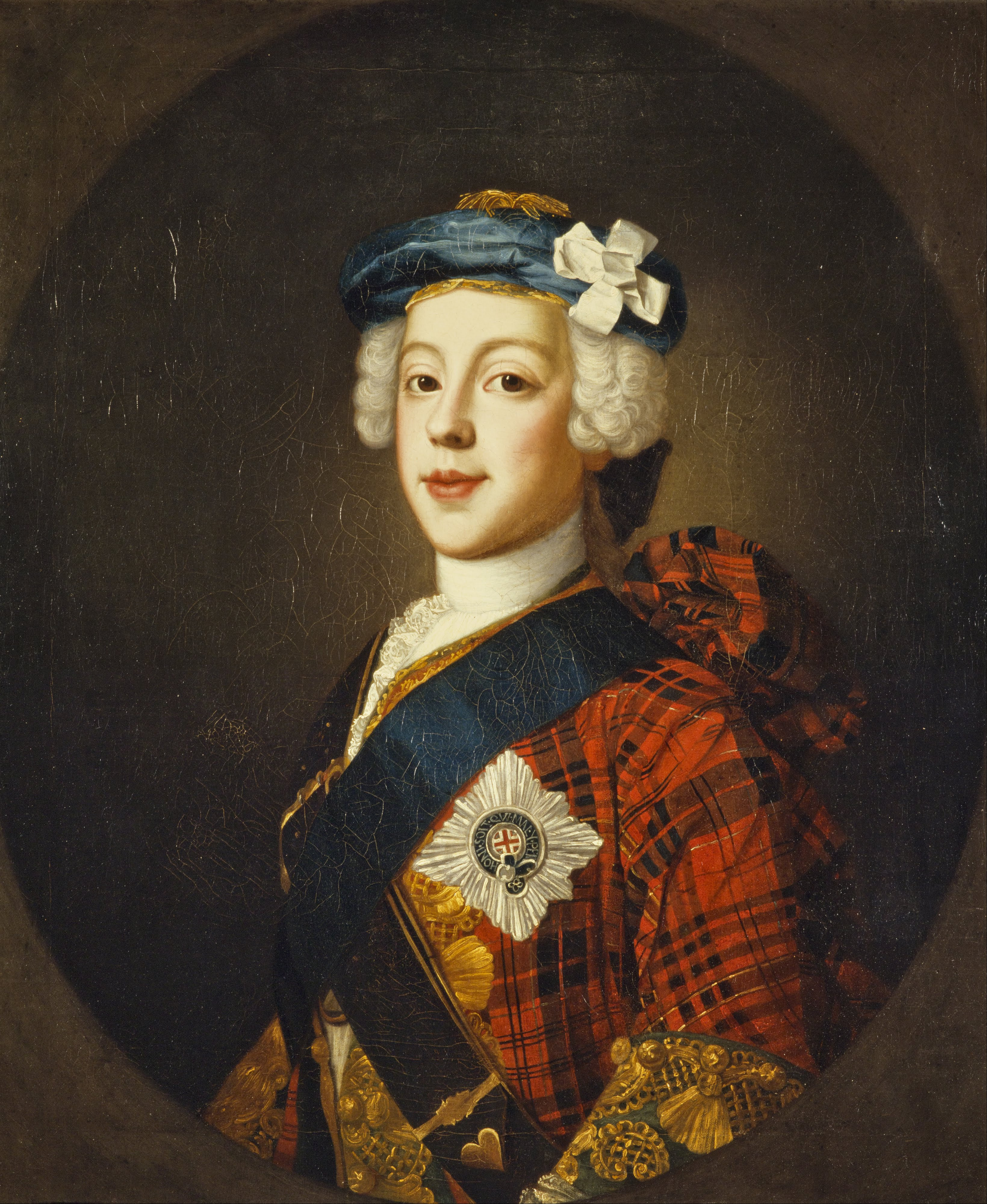
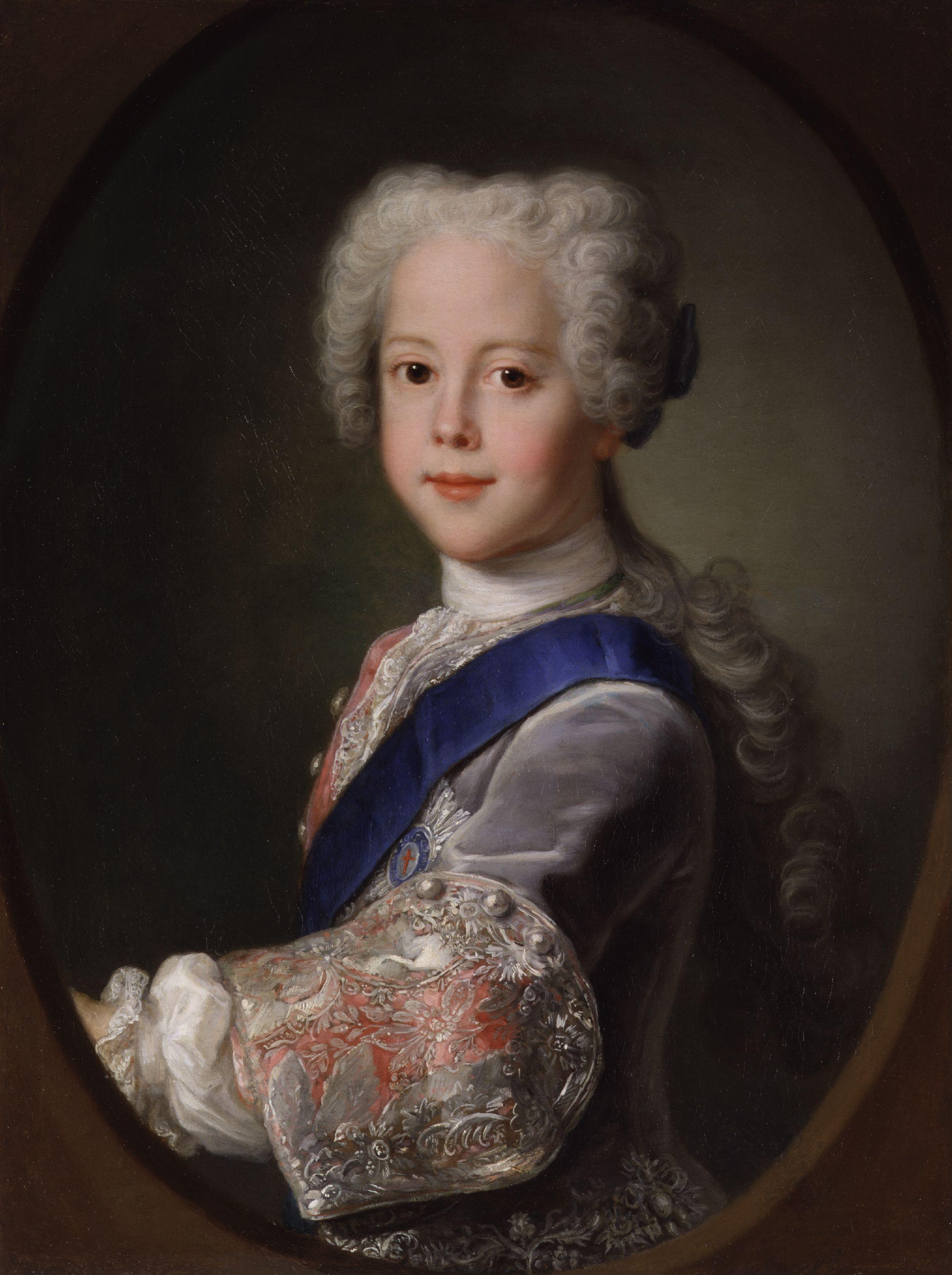
James's two sons, Charles Edward Stuart (left) and Henry Benedict Stuart (right).

=== Marriage and progeny ===
Louise Adélaïde d'Orléans (Mademoiselle d'Orléans), daughter of Philippe II, Duke of Orléans, was at one time suggested as a wife for James, but nothing came of it. In March 1717, while James was visiting Modena, he became engaged to his cousin Benedetta d'Este, but her father Duke Rinaldo put an end to the engagement to preserve his relations with Hanover and Great Britain.

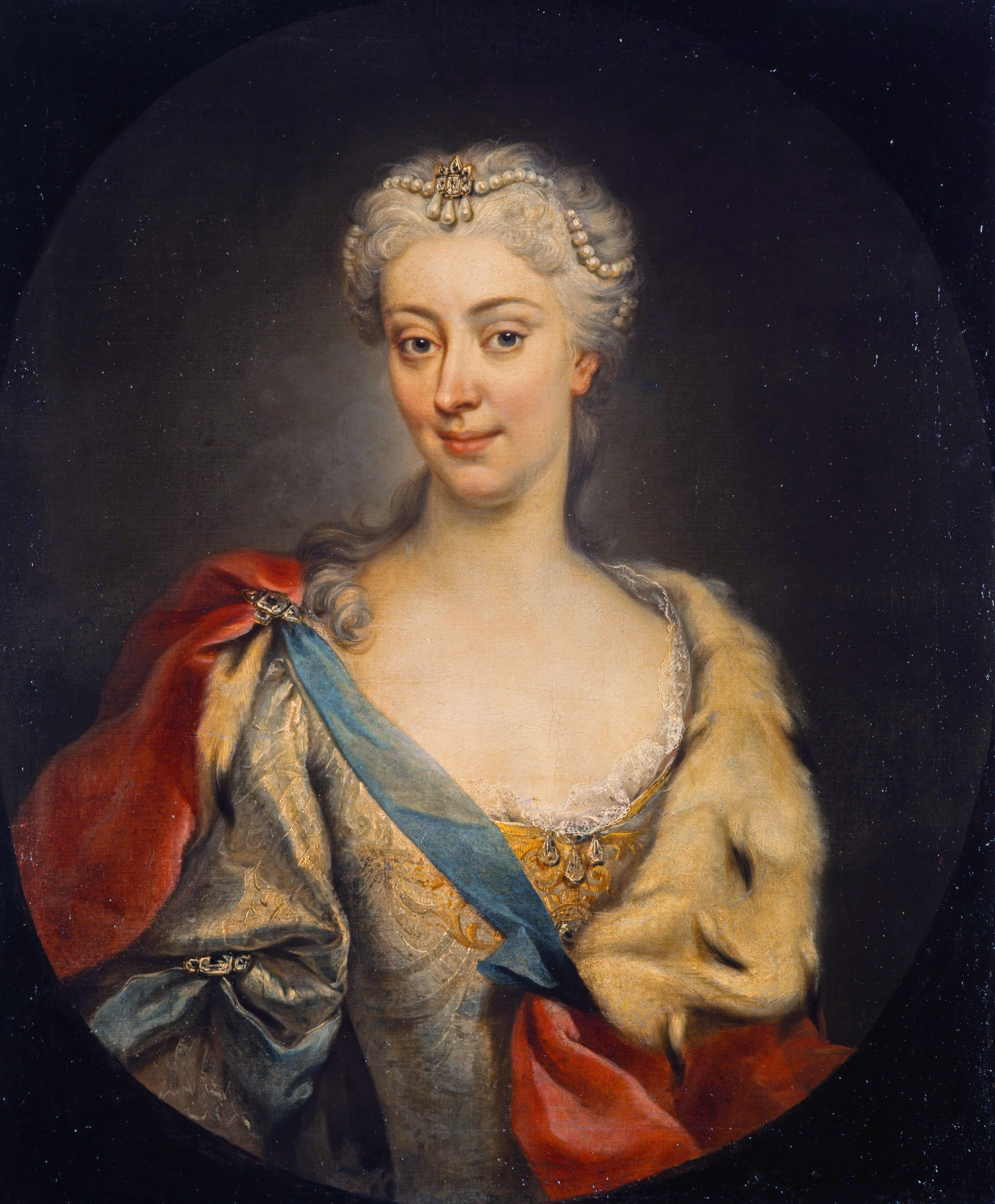
James's wife, Maria Clementina Sobieska

On 3 September 1719, James married Maria Clementina Sobieska (1702–1735), granddaughter of King John III Sobieski of Poland. The wedding was held in the chapel of the Episcopal Palace in Montefiascone, near Viterbo. By his wife he had two sons:

1. Charles Edward Stuart (31 December 1720 – 31 January 1788), nicknamed "Bonnie Prince Charlie"
2. Henry Benedict Stuart (11 March 1725 – 13 July 1807), a cardinal of the Catholic Church

=== Bonnie Prince Charlie ===
Following James's failure, attention turned to his son Charles, "the Young Pretender", who led the major uprising of 1745. With the failure of this second rebellion, the Stuart hopes of regaining the British throne were effectively destroyed. James and Charles later clashed repeatedly, and relations between them broke down completely when James played a role in the appointment of his son Henry as a cardinal. Henry then took holy orders, infuriating Charles, who believed that such an obvious profession of their Catholicism damaged their chances of being restored.

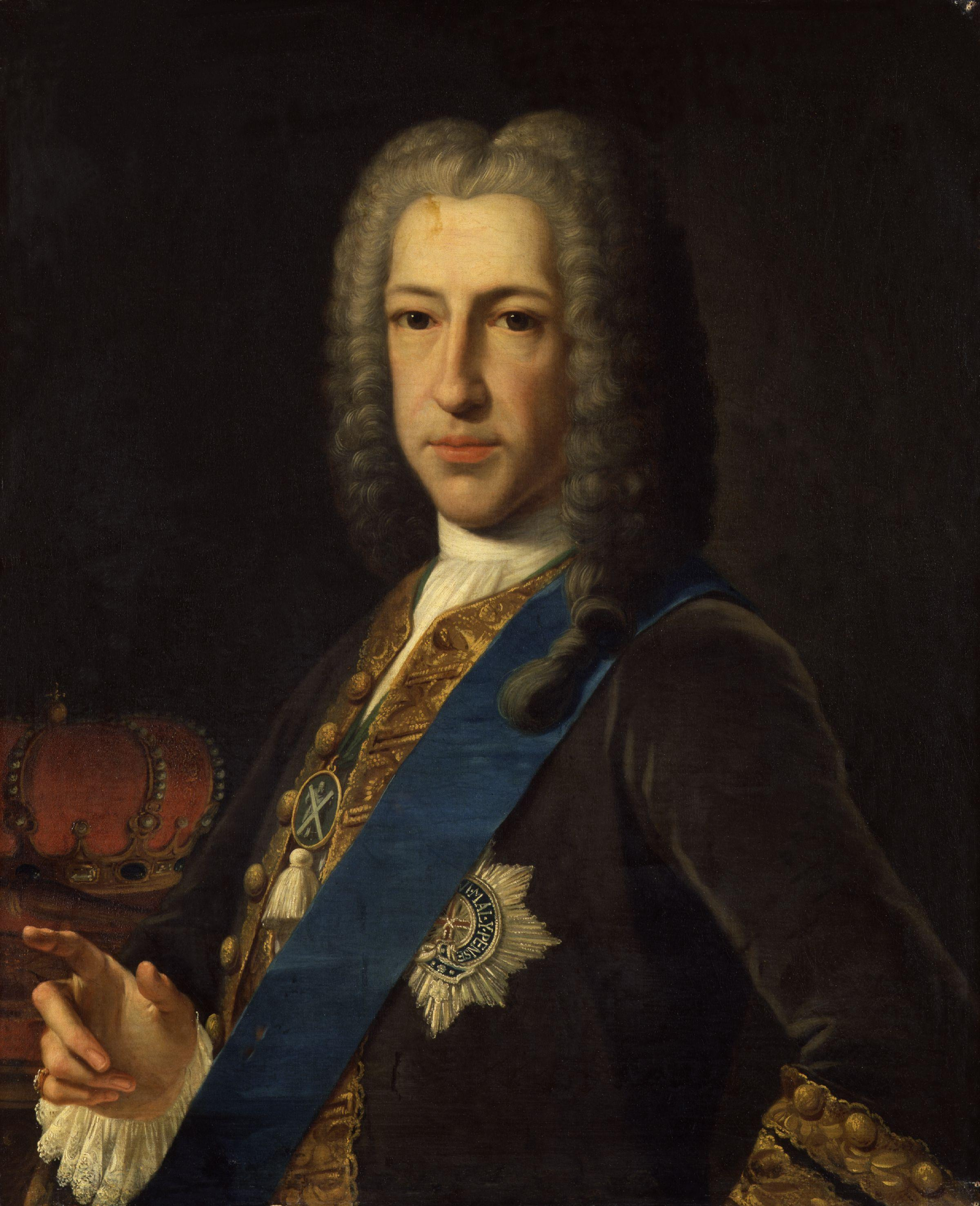
Portrait of James from 1748

=== Later years ===
After the 1745 rising, there were no other plots to restore the Stuart dynasty except for when, in 1759, the French government briefly considered a scheme to have James (then aged 70) crowned King of Ireland as part of their plans to invade Britain, but the offer was never formally made to James. Several separate plans also involved Charles being given control of a French-backed independent Ireland, though that too was aborted after Charles showed up at a meeting with the French to discuss the plan late, argumentative, and idealistic in expectations, so that the French dismissed the possibility of Jacobite assistance.

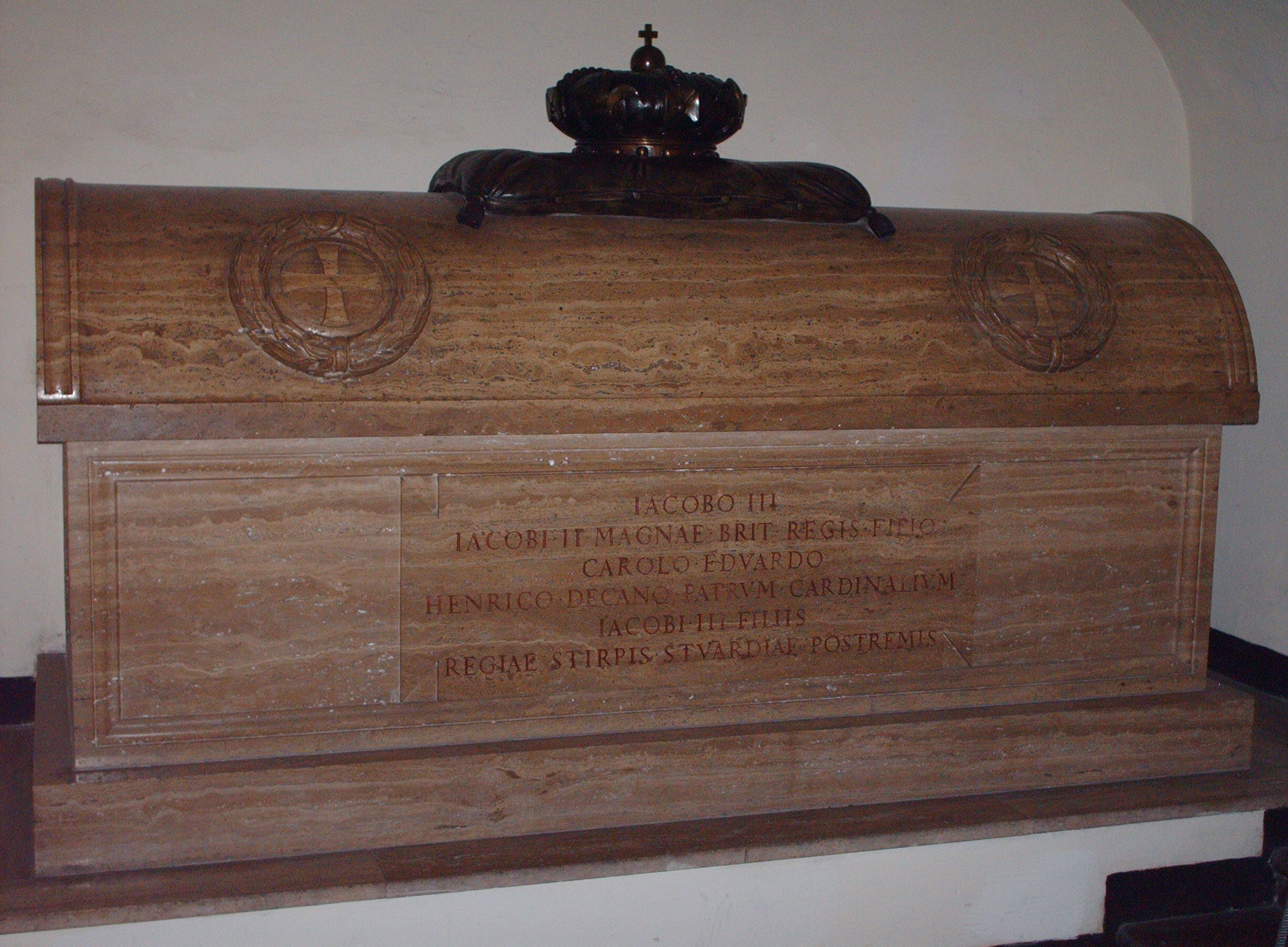
Tomb of James Francis Edward Stuart and his two sons in St. Peter's Basilica

=== Death ===
After a lingering illness, James died aged 77 on 1 January 1766, at his home, the Palazzo Muti in Rome, and was buried in the crypt of St. Peter's Basilica in present-day Vatican City. His grave is marked by the Monument to the Royal Stuarts. His claimed reign had lasted for 64 years, 3 months and 16 days, longer than any British monarch until Queen Elizabeth II's reign surpassed it on 23 May 2016.

== End of papal support ==
The support for James had severely exacerbated the hostility between England and the Catholic Church, but following James's death, the pope refused to recognise the claim to the British and Irish thrones of his elder son Charles. Instead, from 14 January 1766, in stages over the following decade, Rome accepted the Hanoverian dynasty as the legitimate rulers of Britain and Ireland; this was accompanied by a gradual relaxation and reform of the anti-Catholic "penal laws" in Britain and Ireland. Two months after James's death, on 14 March, the royal arms of England were removed from the doorway of the Palazzo Muti. In 1792, the papacy specifically referred to George III as the "King of Great Britain and Ireland", which elicited a protest from James's younger son Henry, who was by then the Jacobite claimant.

== Titles and honours ==
Coat of arms of James Francis Edward Stuart as Prince of Wales

James was Duke of Cornwall from birth. He was created Prince of Wales on 4 July 1688. He lost his titles on his attainder for treason in 1702.

=== Honours ===
- Jacobite, KG: Knight of the Garter, 1692–1766

=== Arms ===
As Prince of Wales, James bore a coat of arms consisting of those of the kingdom, differenced by a label argent of three points.

== Ancestry ==
The British monarchs of the House of Stuart, their relations, and the transition to the Hanovers

James V 1512–1542 r. 1513–1542	Christian III of Denmark; 1503–1559
Mary, Queen of Scots; 1542–1587 r. 1542–1567	Frederick II of Denmark; 1534–1588	Dorothea of Denmark; 1546–1617
James VI and I 1566–1625 r. 1567/1603–1625	Anne of Denmark; 1574–1619	George, Duke of Brunswick-Calenberg; 1582–1641
Henrietta Maria of France; 1609–1669	Charles I 1600–1649 r. 1625–1649	Elizabeth Stuart, Queen of Bohemia; 1596–1662
HANOVER
Charles II; 1630–1685 r. 1660–1685	Mary, Princess Royal and Princess of Orange; 1631–1660	Anne Hyde; 1637–1671	James II and VII; 1633–1701 r. 1685–1688	Mary of Modena; 1658–1718	Sophia of Hanover; 1630–1714	Ernest Augustus, Elector of Hanover; 1629–1698
James Scott, Duke of Monmouth (illegitimate); 1649–1685	William III; 1650–1702 r. 1689–1702	Mary II; 1662–1694 r. 1689–1694	Anne; 1665–1714 r. 1702–1714	James Francis Edward Stuart "the Old Pretender"; 1688–1766	Louisa Maria Stuart; 1692–1712	George I 1660–1727 r. 1714–1727
(no children)	Prince William, Duke of Gloucester; 1689–1700	Charles Edward Stuart "the Young Pretender"; 1720–1788	Henry Benedict Stuart "Cardinal Duke of York"; 1725–1807	George II; 1683–1760 r. 1727–1760

Ancestors of James Francis Edward Stuart

8. James I of England
4. Charles I of England
9. Anne of Denmark
2. James II of England
10. Henry IV of France
5. Henrietta Maria of France
11. Marie de' Medici
1. James Francis Edward Stuart
12. Francesco I d'Este, Duke of Modena
6. Alfonso IV d'Este, Duke of Modena
13. Maria Farnese
3. Mary of Modena
14. Hierronymus Martinozzi
7. Laura Martinozzi
15. Laura Mazarini

== See also ==
- Correspondence with James the Pretender (High Treason) Act 1701, Parliament's response to his claim to the throne
- Touch pieces, used to cure scrofula ('the King's Evil')

== Sources ==
- Bevan, Bryan (1967). King James the Third of England: A Study of Kingship in Exile. Robert Hale.
- Corp, Edward T (2009). A Court in Exile: The Stuarts in France, 1689–1718. Cambridge University Press. ISBN 978-0521108379.
- Miller, Peggy (1971). James. Allen and Unwin. ISBN 9780049230569.

James Francis Edward Stuart House of Stuart Born: 10 June 1688 Died: 1 January 1766
British royalty
Vacant Title last held by Charles (later Charles II)	Prince of Wales; Duke of Cornwall; Duke of Rothesay; 1688	Vacant Title next held by George (later George II)
Titles in pretence
Preceded by James II & VII (deposed from throne)	— TITULAR — King of England, Scotland, France and Ireland; Jacobite succession 1701–1766	Succeeded by Charles Edward Stuart as Charles III
