= Isabel Stuart =

English princess

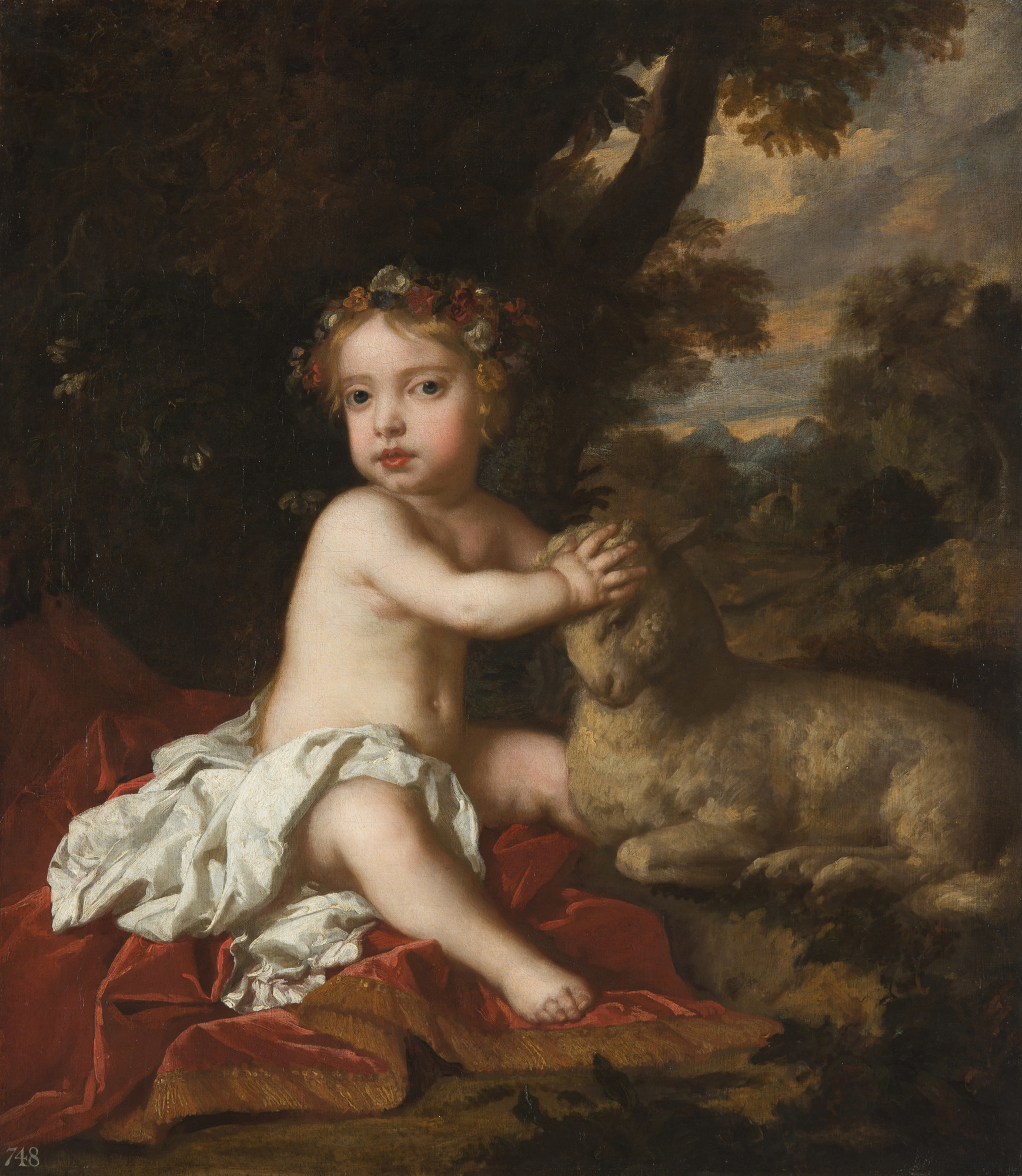
- Portrait after Peter Lely, c. 1679–81
- Born: 28 August 1676; St James's Palace, London, England
- Died: 2 March 1681 (aged 4); St James's Palace, London, England
- Burial: 4 March 1681; Westminster Abbey
- House: Stuart
- Father: James, Duke of York and Albany
- Mother: Princess Mary of Modena

Isabel Stuart (28 August 1676 – 2 March 1681), also called Isobel and Isabella, was a daughter of the future King James II of England and his second wife, Mary of Modena.

Isabel was born at St James's Palace in London. She was the second daughter of James and Mary, after her older sister Catherine Laura who died eleven months before her birth. Isabel had two older half-sisters from her father's first marriage to Anne Hyde: Mary and Anne; both would become reigning Queens of England. Isabel's paternal grandparents were Charles I of England and his wife Henrietta Maria of France; her maternal grandparents were Alfonso IV d'Este and Laura Martinozzi.

== Life ==
For the majority of her lifetime, Isabel was the royal couple's only child and thus fourth in line to the throne (behind her father, Mary and Anne). She was moved down a place upon the birth of her brother Charles Stuart, Duke of Cambridge in 1677; however, he died of smallpox after living only for a month, so Isabel was promoted back up to fourth in line. In 1678, Isabel was joined by another sister, Elizabeth, who was also short-lived.

Her family had a portrait painted of her by Sir Peter Lely.

In 1678, when Isabel was two years old, the Popish Plot led to her parents' being exiled to Brussels to stay with Mary. The royal couple were accompanied by Isabel and Anne.

A report that her uncle King Charles was very sick sent the family hurrying back to England. They feared that the King's eldest illegitimate son, James Scott, 1st Duke of Monmouth and commander of England's armed forces, might usurp the crown if Charles died in their absence. Monmouth enjoyed the support of the Exclusionists, who held a majority in the House of Commons of England. Charles survived but, feeling the family returned to court too soon, sent James and Mary to Edinburgh, where for the next three years they stayed on-and-off in the dilapidated Holyrood Palace, while Anne and Isabel stayed in London on Charles's orders. The couple were recalled to London in February 1680, only to return again to Edinburgh that autumn; this time they went on a more honourable footing: James was created King's Commissioner to Scotland. Separation from Isabel caused her mother to sink into a state of sadness, exacerbated by the passing of the Exclusion bill in the Commons.

Lady Isabel, thus far the only one of Mary's children to survive infancy, died of natural causes in March 1681, at age 4 years, 6 months, at St James's Palace, the place of her birth. She was buried at Westminster Abbey on 4 March (Old Style) as "The Lady Isabella, daughter to the Duke of York.

Isabel's death plunged Mary into a religious mania, worrying her physician. At the same time as news reached Holyrood of Isabel's death, her maternal grandmother, Laura Martinozzi, was falsely accused of offering £10,000 for the murder of the King. The accuser, a pamphleteer, was executed by order of the King.

Four years after Isabel's death, her father succeeded as King of England.

== Ancestry ==
Ancestors of Isabel Stuart

8. James I of England (VI of Scotland); (1566–1625)
4. Charles I of England; (1600–1649)
9. Anne of Denmark; (1574–1619)
2. James II of England; (1633–1701)
10. Henry IV of France; (1553–1610)
5. Henrietta Maria of France; (1609–1669)
11. Marie de' Medici; (1573–1642)
1. Isabel Stuart; (1676–1681)
12. Francesco I d'Este, Duke of Modena; (1610–1658)
6. Alfonso IV d'Este, Duke of Modena; (1634–1662)
13. Maria Farnese; (1615–1646)
3. Mary of Modena; (1658–1718)
14. Girolamo Martinozzi; (born 1610, married 1634)
7. Laura Martinozzi; (1639–1687)
15. Laura Margherita Mazzarini; (1608–1685)
