= James II of England =

King of England, Scotland and Ireland from 1685 to 1688

James II and VII
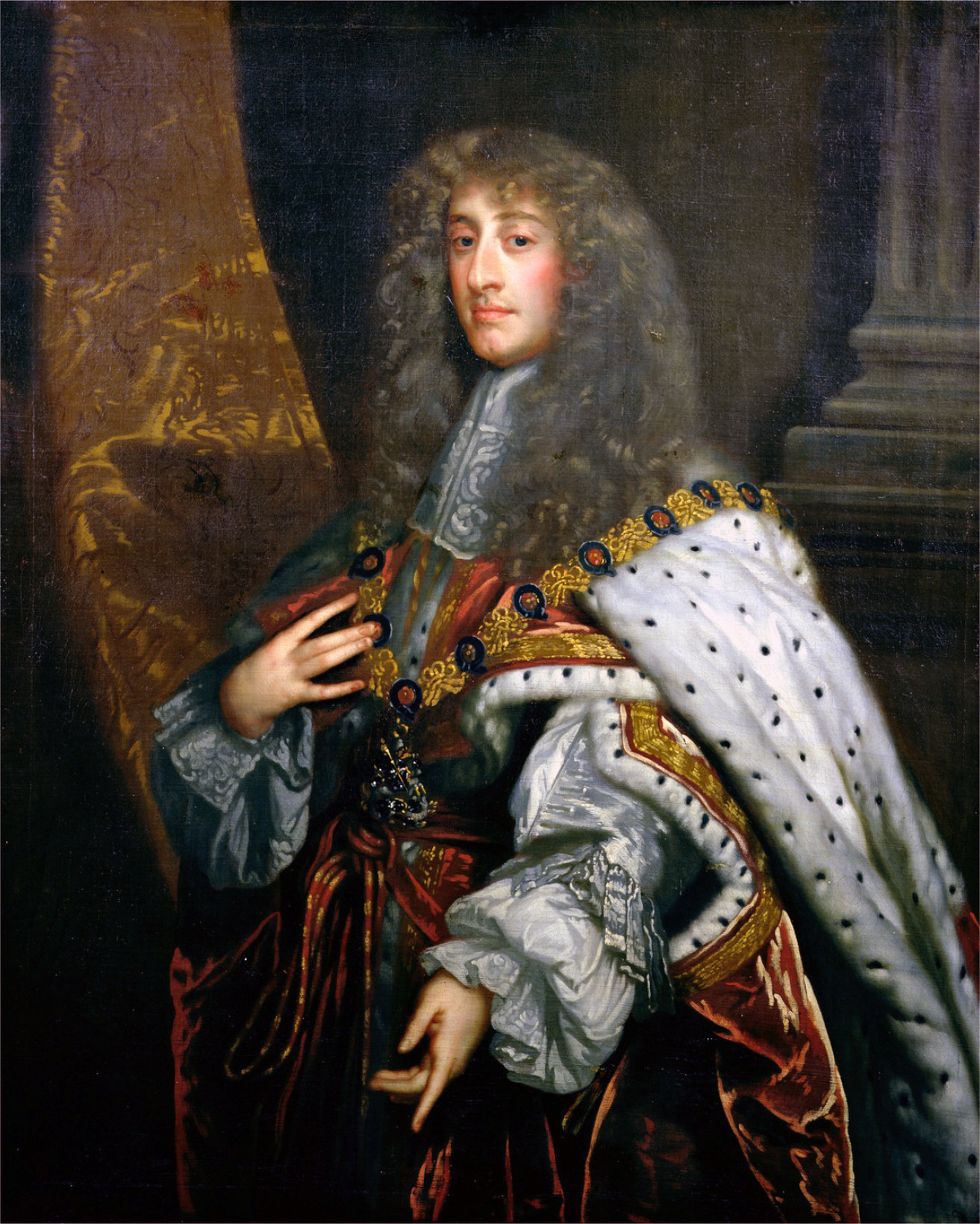

King of England, Scotland, and Ireland
- Reign: 6 February 1685 – 23 December 1688
- Coronation: 23 April 1685
- Predecessor: Charles II
- Successors: Mary II and William III & II
- Born: 14 October 1633 (N.S.: 24 October 1633); St James's Palace, Westminster, England
- Died: 16 September 1701 (aged 67) (Note: An assertion found in many sources that James died on 6 September 1701 (17 September 1701 New Style) may result from a calculation done by the anonymous author of "An Exact Account of the Sickness and Death of the Late King James II, as also of the Proceedings at St. Germains thereupon, 1701, in a letter from an English gentleman in France to his friend in London". The account reads: "And on Friday the 17th instant, about three in the afternoon, the king died, the day he always fasted in memory of our blessed Saviour's passion, the day he ever desired to die on, and the ninth hour, according to the Jewish account, when our Saviour was crucified." As 17 September 1701 New Style falls on a Saturday and the author insists that James died on Friday, "the day he ever desired to die on", so the author may have miscalculated the date.) (N.S.); Château de Saint-Germain-en-Laye, France
- Burial: Church of the English Benedictines, Paris (Note: MacLeod and Waller wrote that all of James's remains were lost in the French Revolution. The English Illustrated Magazine's article on St. Germain from September 1903 claimed that parts of his bowel interred at the parish church of St. Germain-en-Laye were rediscovered in 1824 and reburied. Hilliam disputed that his remains were either scattered or lost, stating that when revolutionaries broke into the church, they were amazed at the body's preservation and it was put on public exhibition where miracles were said to have happened. Hilliam stated that the body was then kept "above ground" until George IV heard about it and ordered the body buried in the parish church of St Germain-en-Laye in 1824.)
- Spouses: Anne Hyde (m. 1660; died 1671) Mary of Modena (m. 1673)
- Issue more...: Charles, Duke of Cambridge; Mary II, Queen of England, Scotland, and Ireland; James, Duke of Cambridge; Anne, Queen of Great Britain and Ireland; Charles, Duke of Kendal; Edgar, Duke of Cambridge; Isabel Stuart; Charles, Duke of Cambridge; James, Prince of Wales; Louisa Maria Stuart; Illegitimate: Henrietta Butler, Viscountess Galmoye; James FitzJames, 1st Duke of Berwick; Henry FitzJames; Catherine Sheffield, Duchess of Buckingham and Normanby
- House: Stuart
- Father: Charles I of England
- Mother: Henrietta Maria of France
- Religion: Protestant (1633–1668); Catholic (1668–1701)

James II and VII (14 October 1633 O.S. – 16 September 1701) was King of England and Ireland as James II and King of Scotland as James VII from February 1685 until he was deposed in the 1688 Glorious Revolution. The last Catholic monarch of England, Scotland, and Ireland, his reign was marked by conflicts over religion, absolutism and the divine right of kings; his deposition ended a century of political and civil strife by confirming the primacy of the English Parliament over the Crown.

James was the second surviving son of Charles I of England and Henrietta Maria of France, and was created Duke of York at birth. His conversion to Catholicism in the 1660s caused growing concern, particularly during the Exclusion Crisis of 1679–81, when attempts were made by Whigs to exclude him from the succession on religious grounds. However, the trauma of the brief republican Commonwealth of England 20 years earlier made the public reluctant to undermine the principle of hereditary succession. At the age of 51, James therefore succeeded to the throne with widespread support following the death of his elder brother, Charles II, with many believing that a Catholic monarchy would be temporary. However, tolerance of James's personal views did not extend to Catholicism in general, and both the English and Scottish parliaments refused to pass measures viewed as undermining the primacy of the Protestant religion. His attempts to impose them by absolutist decrees, as a matter of his perceived divine right, were met with opposition.

In June 1688, two events turned dissent into a renewed crisis. Firstly, the birth of James's son and heir James Francis Edward Stuart on 10 June raised the prospect of a Catholic dynasty, displacing his Protestant daughter Mary, who had been heir presumptive. Secondly, the state prosecution of the Seven Bishops was seen as an assault on the Church of England, and their acquittal on 30 June heavily damaged his political authority. Ensuing anti-Catholic riots in England and Scotland led to a general feeling that only James's removal could prevent another civil war. Leading members of the English political class invited William of Orange, James's nephew and son-in-law, to assume the English throne. When William landed in Brixham on 5 November 1688, James's army deserted and he went into exile in France on 23 December. In February 1689, a special Convention Parliament held James had "vacated" the English throne and installed William and Mary as joint monarchs, thereby establishing the principle that sovereignty derived from Parliament, not birth. James landed in Ireland on 14 March 1689 in an attempt to recover his kingdoms, but, despite a simultaneous rising in Scotland, in April a Scottish Convention followed England in ruling that James had "forfeited" the throne, which was offered to William and Mary.

After his defeat at the Battle of the Boyne in July 1690, James returned to France, where he spent the rest of his life in exile at Saint-Germain, protected by Louis XIV. While contemporary opponents often portrayed him as an absolutist tyrant, some 20th-century historians have praised James for advocating religious tolerance, although more recent scholarship has tended to take a middle ground between these views.

== Early life ==
=== Birth ===
James was born on 14 October 1633 at St James's Palace in London, the second surviving son of King Charles I and his wife, Henrietta Maria of France. Later that same year, he was baptised by William Laud, the Anglican archbishop of Canterbury. He was educated by private tutors, along with his older brother, the future King Charles II, and the two sons of the Duke of Buckingham, George and Francis Villiers. At the age of three, James was appointed Lord High Admiral; the position was initially honorary, but became a substantive office after the Restoration, when James was an adult. He was designated Duke of York at birth, invested with the Order of the Garter in 1642, and formally created Duke of York in January 1644.

=== Wars of the Three Kingdoms ===
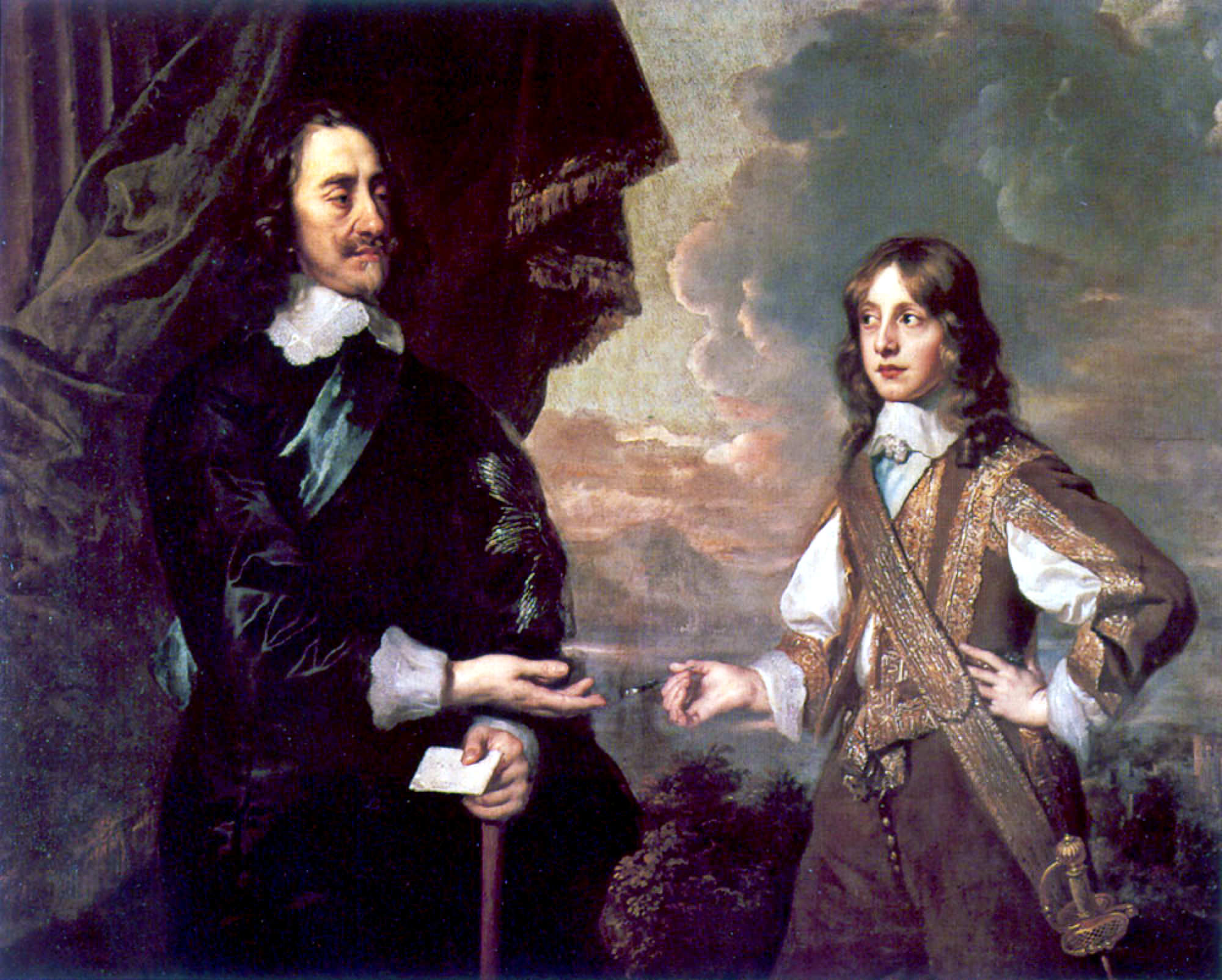
James with his father, Charles I, by Sir Peter Lely, 1647

In August 1642, long running political disputes between Charles I and his opponents in Parliament led to the First English Civil War. James and his brother Charles were present at the Battle of Edgehill in October, and narrowly escaped capture by Parliamentarian cavalry. He spent most of the next four years in the Royalist wartime capital of Oxford, where he was made a Master of Arts by the University on 1 November 1642 and served as colonel of a volunteer regiment of foot. Following the surrender of Oxford in June 1646, James was taken to London and held with his younger siblings Henry, Elizabeth and Henrietta in St James's Palace.

Frustrated by their inability to agree terms with Charles I, and with his brother Charles out of reach in France, Parliament considered making James king. James was ordered by his father to escape, and, with the help of Joseph Bampfield, in April 1648 successfully evaded his guards and crossed the North Sea to The Hague. Following their victory in the 1648 Second English Civil War, Parliament ordered the execution of Charles I in January 1649. The Covenanter regime proclaimed Charles II King of Scotland, and after lengthy negotiations agreed to provide troops to restore him to the English throne. The invasion ended in defeat at Worcester in September 1651. Although Charles managed to escape capture and to return to the exiled court in Paris, the Royalist cause appeared hopeless.

=== Exile in France ===
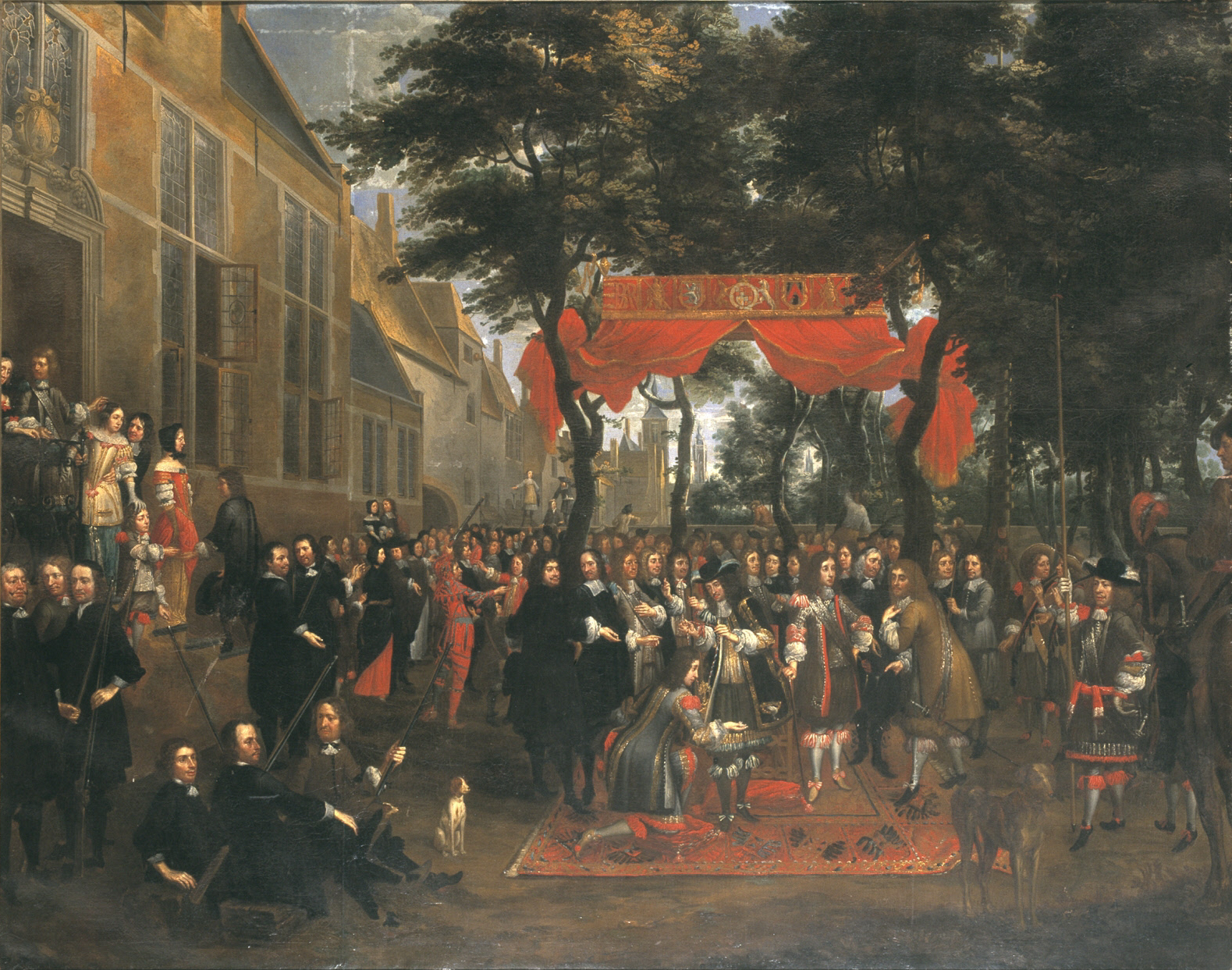
Reception of James and his brother Charles in Bruges on 2 October 1656

James, like his brother, sought refuge in France, serving in the French army under Turenne against the Fronde, and later against their Spanish allies. In the French army James had his first true experience of battle, in which, according to one observer, he "ventures himself and chargeth gallantly where anything is to be done". Turenne's favour led to James being given command of a captured Irish regiment in December 1652, then appointed Lieutenant-General in 1654.

In 1657, France, then engaged in the Franco-Spanish War (1635–1659), agreed an alliance with the Commonwealth of England, and when Charles responded by signing a treaty with Spain, James was expelled from France. James quarrelled with his brother over this choice, but ultimately joined Spanish forces in Flanders led by the French exile Condé. Given command of six regiments of British volunteers, he fought against his former French comrades at the Battle of the Dunes.

After France and Spain made peace with the 1659 Treaty of the Pyrenees, James considered taking a Spanish offer to be an admiral in their navy, but declined the position. Soon after, the 1660 Stuart Restoration returned his brother to the English throne as Charles II.

== Restoration ==
=== First marriage ===
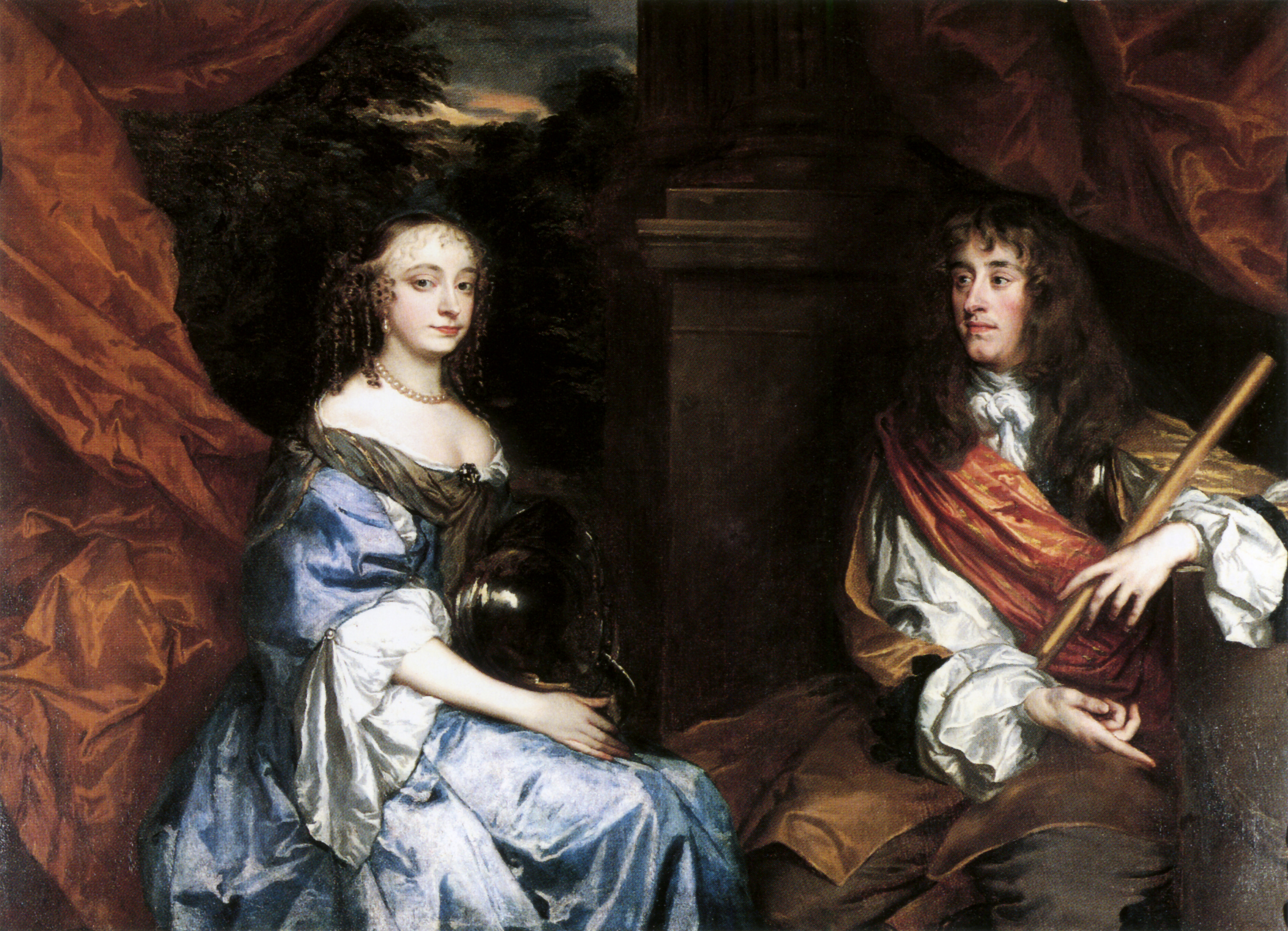
James and Anne Hyde in the 1660s, by Sir Peter Lely

After the collapse of the Commonwealth in 1660, Charles II was restored to the thrones of England, Ireland and Scotland. Although James was the heir presumptive, it seemed unlikely that he would inherit the Crown, as Charles was still a young man capable of fathering children. On 31 December 1660, following his brother's restoration, James was created Duke of Albany in Scotland, to go along with his English title, Duke of York. Upon his return to England, James prompted an immediate controversy by announcing his engagement to Anne Hyde, the daughter of Charles's chief minister, Edward Hyde.

In 1659, while trying to seduce her, James promised he would marry Anne. Anne became pregnant in 1660, but following the Restoration and James's return to power, no one at the royal court expected a prince to marry a commoner, no matter what he had pledged beforehand. Although nearly everyone, including Anne's father, urged the two not to marry, the couple married secretly, then went through an official marriage ceremony on 3 September 1660 in London.

The couple's first child, Charles, was born less than two months later, but died in infancy, as did five further children. Only two daughters survived: Mary (born 30 April 1662) and Anne (born 6 February 1665). Samuel Pepys wrote that James was fond of his children and his role as a father, and played with them "like an ordinary private father of a child", a contrast to the distant parenting common with royalty at the time.

James's wife was devoted to him and influenced many of his decisions. Even so, he kept mistresses, including Arabella Churchill and Catherine Sedley, and was reputed to be "the most unguarded ogler of his time". Samuel Pepys recorded in his diary that James "did eye my wife mightily". James's taste in women was often maligned, with Gilbert Burnet famously remarking that James's mistresses must have been "given [to] him by his priests as a penance". Anne Hyde died in 1671.

=== Military and other offices ===
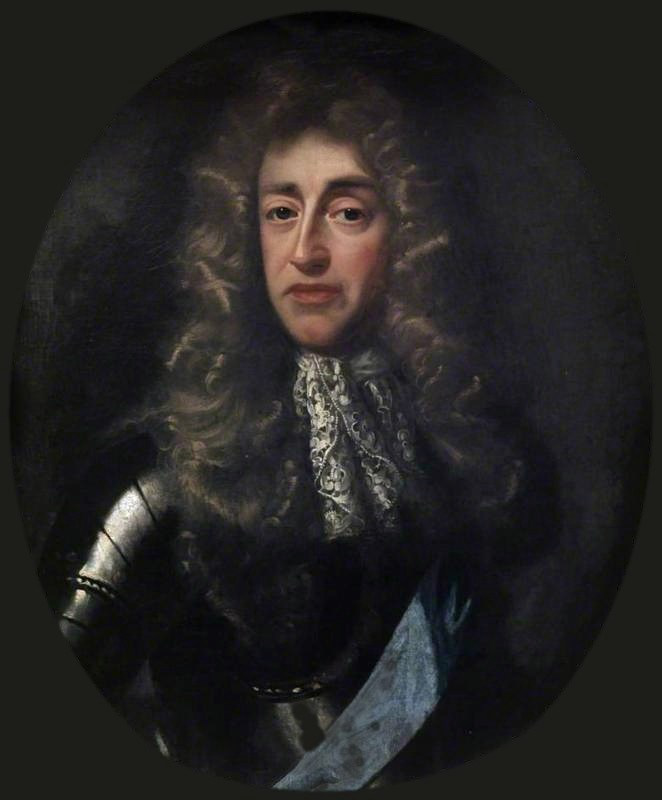
James in the 1660s by John Riley

Settlement on Duke of York Act 1663
- Act of Parliament
- Parliament of England
- Long title: An Act for setling the Proffitts of the Post Office and Power of graunting Wyne Lycences on his Royall Highnes the Duke of Yorke and the Heires Males of his Body.
- Citation: 15 Cha. 2. c. 14; 15 Cha. 2. c. 1 Pr.
- Territorial extent: England and Wales

Dates
- Royal assent: 27 July 1663
- Commencement: 18 February 1663 (Note: Start of session.)
- Repealed: 28 July 1863
Other legislation
| Amended by | Post Office Revenues Act 1670 |
| Repealed by | Statute Law Revision Act 1863 |
| Relates to | Post Office Act 1660 |

Status: Repealed

Text of statute as originally enacted

Post Office Revenues Act 1670
- Act of Parliament
- Parliament of England
- Long title: An Act for explaining of a Proviso conteyned in an Act, entituled "An Act for settling the Profitts of ye Post-Office and Power of granteing Wine-Licences on His Royall Highnes ye Duke of Yorke and the Heyres Males of his Body."
- Citation: 22 & 23 Cha. 2. c. 27
- Territorial extent: England and Wales

Dates
- Royal assent: 22 April 1671
- Commencement: 24 October 1670
- Repealed: 28 July 1863
Other legislation
| Amends | Settlement on Duke of York Act 1663 |
| Repealed by | Statute Law Revision Act 1863 |
| Relates to | Post Office Act 1660 |

Status: Repealed

Text of statute as originally enacted

After the Restoration, James was confirmed as Lord High Admiral, an office that carried with it the subsidiary appointments of Governor of Portsmouth and Lord Warden of the Cinque Ports. In October 1660, Charles II appointed his brother the Governor of the Royal Adventurers into Africa ("the company" which was later reformed as the Royal African Company in 1672). The company had senior courtiers (including the King), ministers and admirals among its investors. Its purpose was to exploit trade opportunities in West Africa. Gold, ivory, redwood and other products from the region were sought-after cargoes, but by 1665, the slave trade to the Americas represented 25 per cent of its income. Over its lifetime, the Royal African Company carried more enslaved Africans across the Atlantic than "any other single institution".

To achieve a dominant commercial presence on the West African coast, it was believed that the Dutch needed to be displaced from their trading posts there. The company sent ships to capture them, supported, in 1664, by the Royal Navy frigate Jersey under the command of Robert Holmes. This was a major cause of the Second Anglo-Dutch War (1665–1667).

The Navy was used in later years to assist the company, showing a distinct blurring of the responsibilities between the state and a commercial enterprise, in accordance with the principles of mercantilism. James continued in his role in the company until after the Glorious Revolution, when he was forced to resign.

James was very active in his role in the Royal Navy. Immediately after the Restoration, he worked on confirming the posts of ships' officers and officials in the administration of the Navy, and making new appointments to replace those ousted by the change in regime. He was a regular attendee at meetings of the Admiralty committees (Note: James's presence was often not minuted by Pepys, especially when James became a problematic political entity). In the Second Anglo-Dutch War, he commanded the fleet at the Battle of Lowestoft, being in the thick of the fighting. Three courtiers standing beside him on the deck of Royal Charles were decapitated by one chain shot from the Dutch flagship, spattering James with blood and brains. After this event, and perhaps with the security of the Royal succession in mind, the King removed James from active service for the rest of the war. The same sequence was repeated in the Third Anglo-Dutch War (1672–1674), with James commanding the fleet at the Battle of Solebay, where he had to move his flag twice as his successive flagships were disabled by enemy action, the captain of the first, Prince, being killed beside him. In the midst of the intense fighting, James strode along the deck, encouraging the gun crews. James's undoubtedly brave performance in this battle is marred by some accusing him of issuing unclear orders to the French squadron (allies of the British fleet). As before, he was removed from front-line service after this battle.

Following the raid on the Medway in 1667, James oversaw the survey and re-fortification of the southern coast. The office of Lord High Admiral, combined with his revenue from post office and wine tariffs (positions granted him by Charles II upon his restoration), gave James enough money to keep a sizable court household.

In 1664, Charles II granted American territory between the Delaware and Connecticut rivers to James. Following its capture by the British, the former Dutch territory of New Netherland and its principal port, New Amsterdam, were renamed the Province and City of New York in James's honour. James granted liberty of consciousness to the mixed population of the colony, but resisted their demands for a representative assembly. James gave part of the colony to proprietors George Carteret and John Berkeley. Fort Orange, 150 miles (240 km) north on the Hudson River, was renamed Albany after James's Scottish title. In 1683, James became the Governor of the Hudson's Bay Company, but did not take an active role in its governance.

In September 1666, Charles II put James in charge of firefighting operations during the Great Fire of London, in the absence of action by Lord Mayor Thomas Bloodworth. This was not a political office, but his actions and leadership were noteworthy. "The Duke of York hath won the hearts of the people with his continual and indefatigable pains day and night in helping to quench the Fire", wrote a witness in a letter on 8 September.

In 1672, the Royal African Company received a new charter from Charles II. It set up forts and factories, maintained troops, and exercised martial law in West Africa in pursuit of trade in gold, silver and African slaves. In the 1680s, the RAC transported about 5,000 slaves a year to markets primarily in the English Caribbean across the Atlantic. Many were branded on the chest with the letters "DY" for "Duke of York", the RAC's Governor.

=== Conversion to Roman Catholicism and second marriage ===
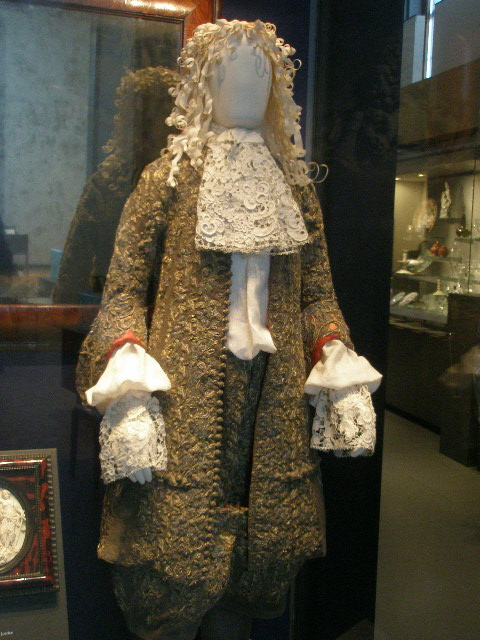
Wedding suit of James II, 1673, in the Victoria and Albert Museum

James's time in France had exposed him to the beliefs and ceremonies of the Roman Catholic Church, and both he and his wife Anne became drawn to that faith. (Note: Anne "made the greatest single impact upon his thinking" and that she converted shortly after the Restoration, "almost certainly before her husband".) James took Catholic Eucharist in 1668 or 1669, although his conversion was kept secret for almost a decade as he continued to attend Anglican services until 1676. In spite of his conversion, James continued to associate primarily with Anglicans, including John Churchill and George Legge, as well as French Protestants such as Louis de Duras, 2nd Earl of Feversham.

Growing fears of Roman Catholic influence at court led the English Parliament to introduce a new Test Act in 1673. Under this Act, all civil and military officials were required to take an oath (in which they were required to disavow the doctrine of transubstantiation and denounce certain practices of the Roman Church as superstitious and idolatrous) and to receive the Eucharist under the auspices of the Church of England. James refused to perform either action, instead choosing to relinquish the post of Lord High Admiral. His already suspected conversion to Roman Catholicism was thereby made public.

King Charles II opposed James's public conversion, ordering that James's daughters, Mary and Anne, be raised in the Church of England. Nevertheless, he allowed the widowed James to marry the Catholic Mary of Modena, a fifteen-year-old Italian princess. James and Mary were married by proxy in a Roman Catholic ceremony on 20 September 1673. On 21 November, Mary arrived in England and Nathaniel Crew, Bishop of Oxford, performed a brief Anglican service that did little more than recognise the marriage by proxy. Many British people, distrustful of Catholicism, regarded the new Duchess of York as an agent of the Papacy. James was noted for his deep devotion, once remarking, "If occasion were, I hope God would give me his grace to suffer death for the true Catholic religion as well as banishment."

=== Exclusion Crisis ===
In 1677, King Charles II arranged for James's daughter Mary to marry the Protestant Prince William III of Orange, son of Charles's and James's sister Mary. James reluctantly acquiesced after his brother and nephew had agreed to the marriage. (Note: According to Turner, James's reaction to the agreement was "The King shall be obeyed, and I would be glad if all his subjects would learn of me to obey him".) Despite the Protestant marriage, fears of a potential Catholic monarch persisted, intensified by the failure of Charles II and his wife, Catherine of Braganza, to produce any children. A defrocked Anglican clergyman, Titus Oates, spoke of a "Popish Plot" to kill Charles and to put the Duke of York on the throne. The fabricated plot caused a wave of anti-Catholic hysteria to sweep across the nation.

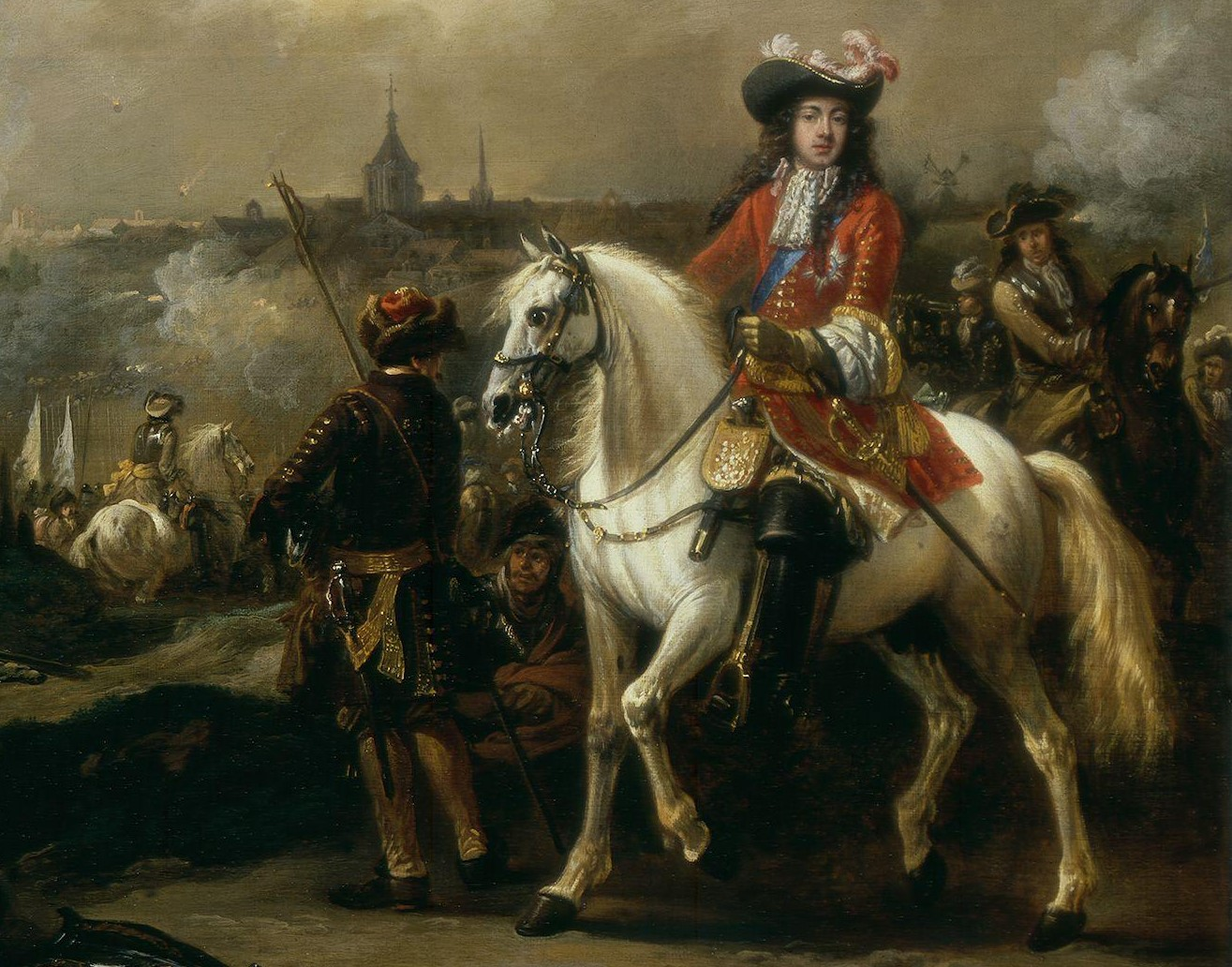
The Duke of Monmouth was involved in plots against James.

In England, the Earl of Shaftesbury, a former government minister and now a leading opponent of Catholicism, proposed an Exclusion Bill that would have excluded James from the line of succession. Some members of Parliament even proposed to pass the crown to Charles's illegitimate son, James Scott, 1st Duke of Monmouth, or for Charles to declare that Monmouth was his legitimate son. In 1679, with the Exclusion Bill in danger of passing, Charles II dissolved Parliament. Two further Parliaments were elected in 1680 and 1681, but were dissolved for the same reason. The Exclusion Crisis contributed to the development of the English two-party system: the Whigs were those who supported the Bill, while the Tories were those who opposed it. Ultimately, the succession was not altered, but James was convinced to withdraw from all policy-making bodies and to accept a lesser role in his brother's government.

On the orders of the King, James left England for Brussels. In 1680, he was appointed Lord High Commissioner of Scotland and took up residence at the Holyrood Palace in Edinburgh to suppress an uprising and oversee the royal government. James returned to England for a time when Charles was stricken ill and appeared to be near death. The hysteria of the accusations eventually faded, but James's relations with many in the English Parliament, including the Earl of Danby, a former ally, were forever strained and a solid segment turned against him.

On 6 May 1682, James narrowly escaped the sinking of HMS Gloucester, in which between 130 and 250 people perished. James argued with the pilot about the navigation of the ship before it ran aground on a sandbank, and then delayed abandoning ship in order to save his papers, which may have contributed to the death toll.

=== Return to favour ===
In 1683, a plot was uncovered to assassinate Charles II and his brother and spark a republican revolution to re-establish a government of the Cromwellian style. The conspiracy, known as the Rye House Plot, backfired upon its conspirators and provoked a wave of sympathy for the King and James. Several notable Whigs, including the Earl of Essex and the Duke of Monmouth, were implicated. Monmouth initially confessed to complicity in the plot and implicated fellow conspirators, but later recanted. Essex committed suicide, and Monmouth, along with several others, was obliged to flee into exile in continental Europe. Charles II reacted to the plot by increasing the repression of Whigs and dissenters. Taking advantage of James's rebounding popularity, Charles invited him back onto the Privy Council in 1684. While some in the English Parliament remained wary of the possibility of a Roman Catholic king, the threat of excluding James from the throne had passed.

== Reign ==
=== Accession to the throne ===
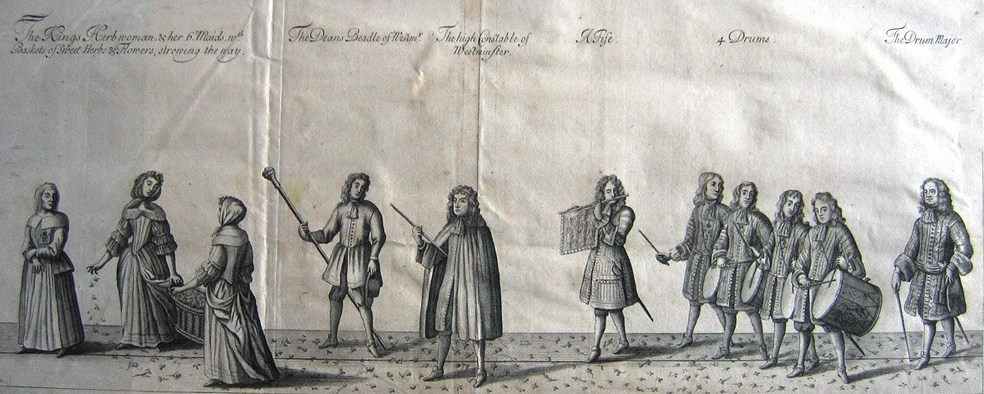
Coronation procession of King James II and Queen Mary, 1685

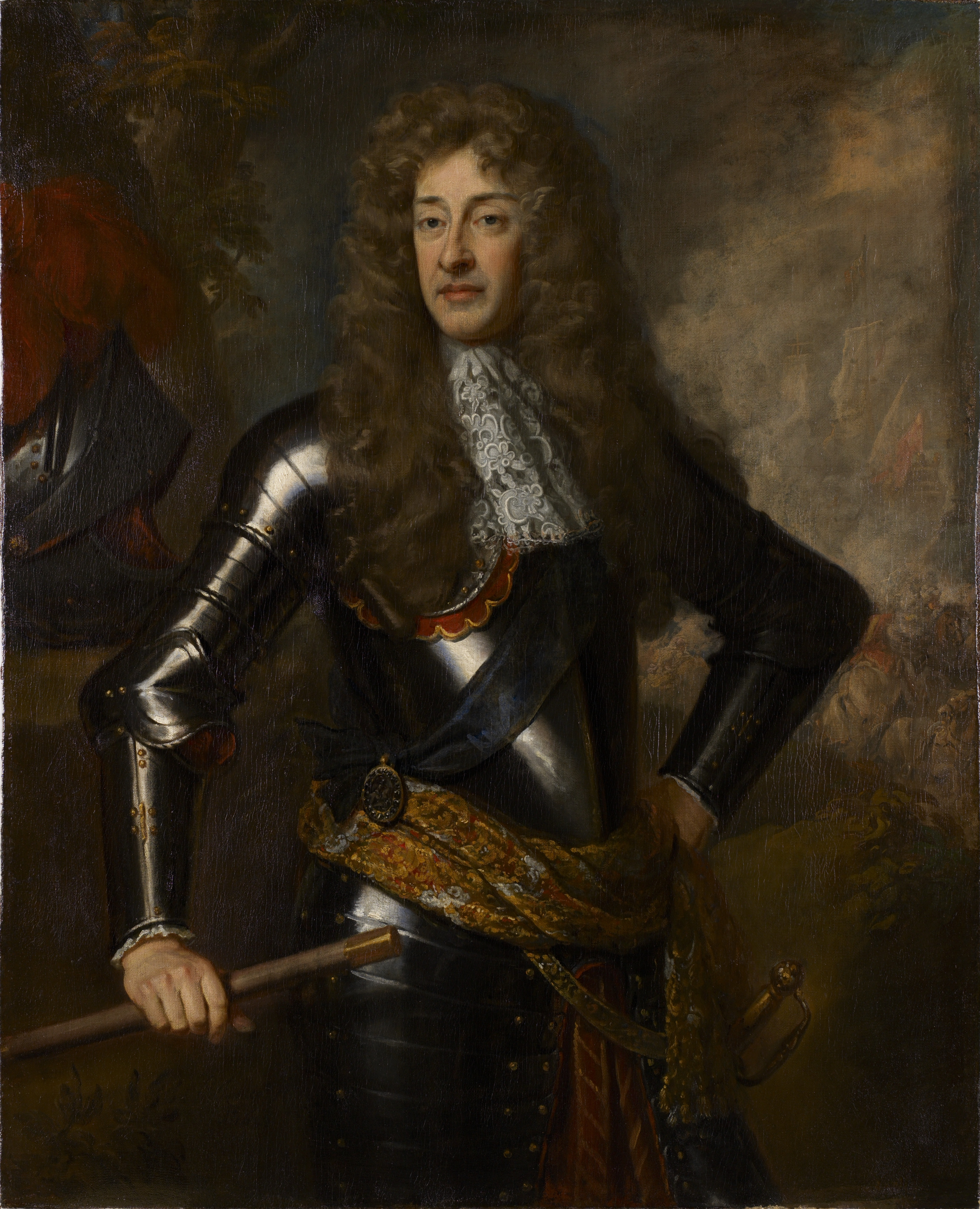
Portrait in the 1680s by Godfrey Kneller

Charles II died on 6 February 1685 from apoplexy, after supposedly converting to Catholicism on his deathbed. Having no legitimate children, he was succeeded by his brother James, who reigned in England and Ireland as James II and in Scotland as James VII. There was little initial opposition to James's accession, and there were widespread reports of public rejoicing at the orderly succession. He wished to proceed quickly to the coronation, and he and Mary were crowned at Westminster Abbey on 23 April 1685.

The new Parliament that assembled in May 1685, which gained the name of "Loyal Parliament", was initially favourable to James, who had stated that most former exclusionists would be forgiven if they acquiesced to his rule. Most of Charles's officers continued in office, the exceptions being the promotion of James's brothers-in-law, the earls of Clarendon and Rochester, and the demotion of Halifax. Parliament granted James a generous life income, including all of the proceeds of tonnage and poundage and the customs duties. James worked harder as king than his brother had, but was less willing to compromise when his advisers disagreed with his policies.

=== Two rebellions ===
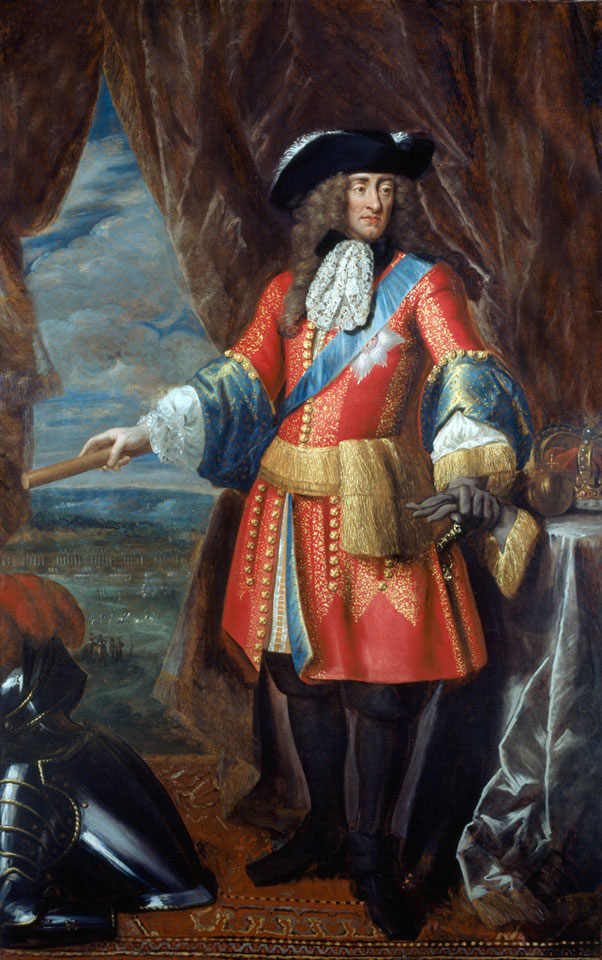
James portrayed c. 1685 in his role as head of the army, wearing a general officer's state coat

Soon after becoming king, James faced a rebellion in southern England led by his nephew, James Scott, 1st Duke of Monmouth, and another rebellion in Scotland led by Archibald Campbell, 9th Earl of Argyll. Monmouth and Argyll both began their expeditions from Holland, where James's nephew and son-in-law, the Prince of Orange, had neglected to detain them or put a stop to their recruitment efforts.

Argyll sailed to Scotland where he raised recruits, mainly from his own clan, the Campbells. The rebellion was quickly crushed, and Argyll was captured at Inchinnan on 18 June 1685. Having arrived with fewer than 300 men and unable to convince many more to flock to his standard, he never posed a credible threat to James. Argyll was taken as a prisoner to Edinburgh. A new trial was not commenced because Argyll had previously been tried and sentenced to death. The King confirmed the earlier death sentence and ordered that it be carried out within three days of receiving the confirmation.

Monmouth's rebellion was coordinated with Argyll's, but was more dangerous to James. Monmouth had proclaimed himself King at Lyme Regis on 11 June. He attempted to raise recruits but was unable to gather enough rebels to defeat even James's small standing army. Monmouth's soldiers attacked the King's army at night, in an attempt at surprise, but were defeated at the Battle of Sedgemoor. The King's forces, led by Feversham and Churchill, quickly dispersed the ill-prepared rebels. Monmouth was captured and later executed at the Tower of London on 15 July. The King's judges—most notably, George Jeffreys—condemned many of the rebels to transportation and indentured servitude in the West Indies in a series of trials that came to be known as the Bloody Assizes. Around 250 of the rebels were executed. While both rebellions were defeated easily, they hardened James's resolve against his enemies and increased his suspicion of the Dutch.

=== Religious liberty and dispensing power ===
To protect himself from further rebellions, James sought safety by enlarging his standing army. This alarmed his subjects, not only because of the trouble soldiers caused in the towns, but because it was against English tradition to keep a professional army in peacetime, being seen as both legally dubious and a dangerous instrument for a would-be autocrat. Even more alarming to Parliament was James's use of his dispensing power to allow Roman Catholics to command several regiments without having to take the oath mandated by the Test Act. When even the previously supportive Parliament objected to these measures, James ordered Parliament prorogued in November 1685, never to meet again in his reign. At the beginning of 1686, two papers were found in Charles II's strong box and his closet, in his own hand, stating the arguments for Catholicism over Protestantism. James published these papers with a declaration signed by his sign manual and challenged the Archbishop of Canterbury and the whole Anglican episcopal bench to refute Charles's arguments: "Let me have a solid answer, and in a gentlemanlike style; and it may have the effect which you so much desire of bringing me over to your church." The Archbishop refused on the grounds of respect for the late king.

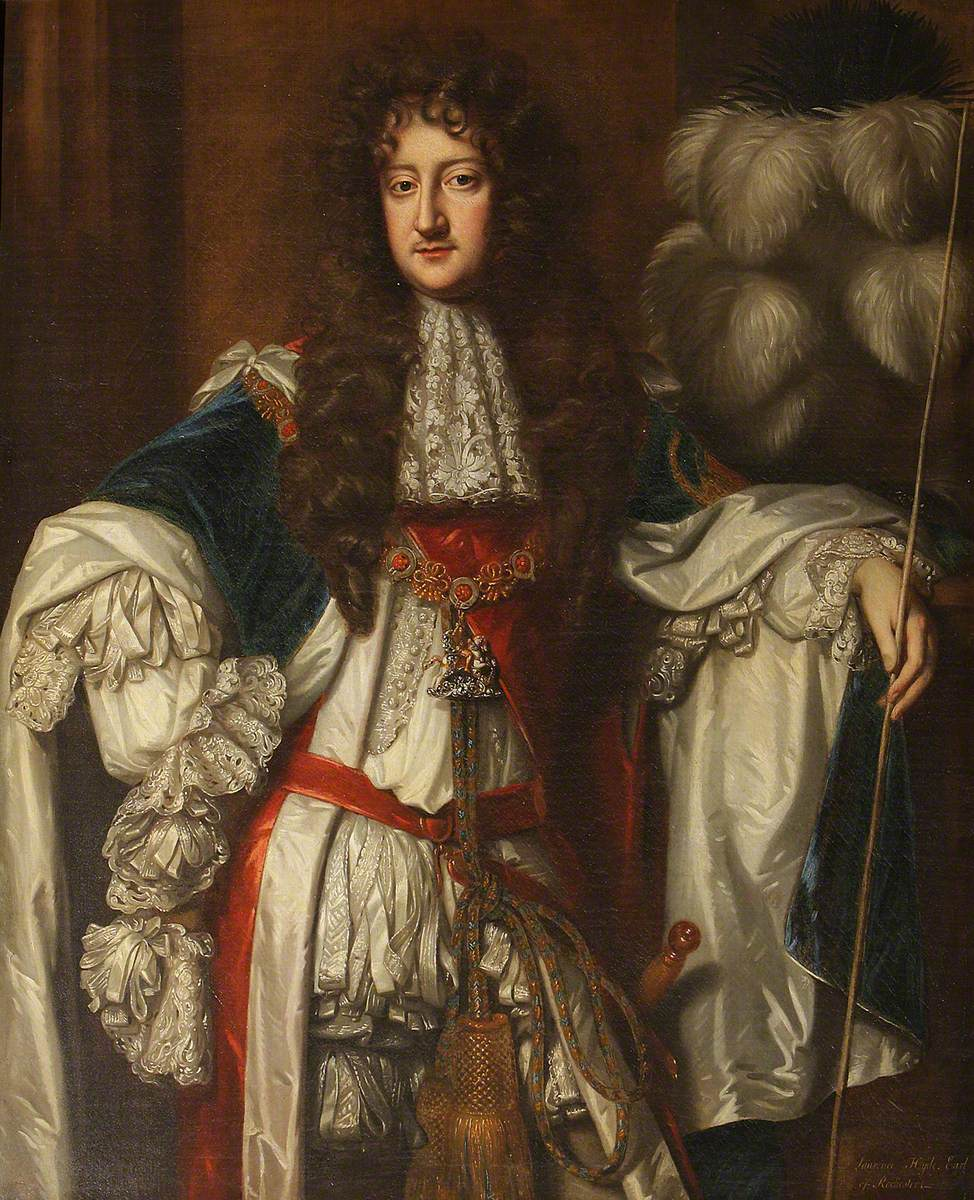
Laurence Hyde, 1st Earl of Rochester, once a supporter of James, turned against him by 1688.

James advocated repeal of the penal laws in all three of his kingdoms, but in the early years of his reign he refused to allow those dissenters who did not petition for relief to receive it. (Note: Covenanters, as they did not recognise James (or any uncovenanted king) as a legitimate ruler, would not petition James for relief from the penal laws.) James sent a letter to the Scottish Parliament at its opening in 1685, declaring his wish for new penal laws against refractory Presbyterians and lamented that he was not there in person to promote such a law. In response, the Parliament passed an Act that stated, "whoever should preach in a conventicle under a roof, or should attend, either as preacher or as a hearer, a conventicle in the open air, should be punished with death and confiscation of property". In March 1686, James sent a letter to the Scottish Privy Council advocating toleration for Roman Catholics but not for rebellious Presbyterian Covenanters. Presbyterians would later call this period "The Killing Time".

James allowed Roman Catholics to occupy the highest offices of his kingdoms, and received at his court the papal nuncio, Ferdinando d'Adda, the first representative from Rome to London since the reign of Mary I. Edward Petre, James's Jesuit confessor, was a particular object of Anglican ire. When the King's Secretary of State, the Earl of Sunderland, began replacing office-holders at court with "Papist" favourites, James began to lose the confidence of many of his Anglican supporters. Sunderland's purge of office-holders even extended to the King's brothers-in-law (the Hydes) and their supporters. In May 1686, James sought to obtain a ruling from the English common-law courts that showed he had the power to dispense with Acts of Parliament. He dismissed judges who disagreed with him on this matter, as well as the Solicitor General, Heneage Finch. The case of Godden v Hales affirmed his dispensing power, with eleven out of the twelve judges ruling in the king's favour after six judges were dismissed for refusing to promise to support the king.

In 1687, James issued the Declaration of Indulgence, also known as the Declaration for Liberty of Conscience, in which he used his dispensing power to negate the effect of laws punishing both Roman Catholics and Protestant Dissenters. In the summer of 1687 he attempted to increase support for his tolerationist policy by a speaking tour of the western counties of England. As part of this tour, he gave a speech at Chester in which he said, "suppose... there should be a law made that all black men should be imprisoned, it would be unreasonable and we had as little reason to quarrel with other men for being of different [religious] opinions as for being of different complexions." At the same time, James provided partial toleration in Scotland, using his dispensing power to grant relief to Roman Catholics and partial relief to Presbyterians.

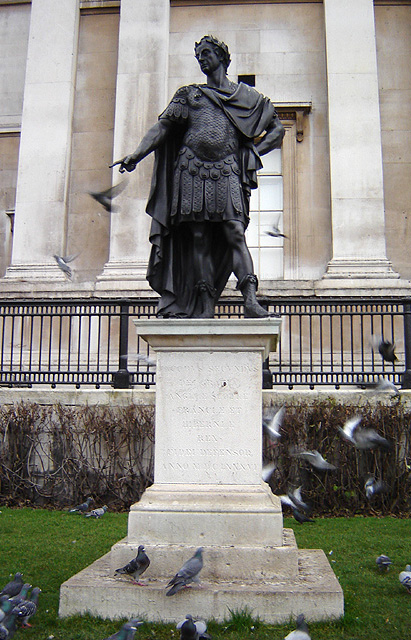
1686 statue of James II by Peter Van Dievoet in Trafalgar Square, London

In 1688, James ordered the Declaration read from the pulpits of every Anglican church, further alienating the Anglican bishops against the Supreme Governor of their church. While the Declaration elicited some thanks from its beneficiaries, it left the Established Church, the traditional ally of the monarchy, in the difficult position of being forced to erode its own privileges. James provoked further opposition by attempting to reduce the Anglican monopoly on education. At the University of Oxford, he offended Anglicans by allowing Roman Catholics to hold important positions in Christ Church and University College, two of Oxford's largest colleges. He also attempted to force the Fellows of Magdalen College to elect as their President Anthony Farmer, a man of generally ill repute who was believed to be a Roman Catholic, (Note: Historians are unclear on Farmer's exact religious affiliation. Macaulay wrote that Farmer "pretended to turn Papist". Prall called him a "Catholic sympathizer". Miller wrote that "although he had not declared himself a Catholic, it was believed he was no longer an Anglican". Ashley did not refer to Farmer by name, but only as the King's Catholic nominee. All these sources agreed that Farmer's bad reputation as a "person of scandalous character" was as much a deterrent to his nomination as his uncertain religious loyalties.) which was seen as a violation of the Fellows' right to elect someone of their own choosing.

In 1687, James prepared to pack Parliament with his supporters, so that it would repeal the Test Act and the Penal Laws. James was convinced by addresses from Dissenters that he had their support and so could dispense with relying on Tories and Anglicans. He instituted a wholesale purge of those in offices under the Crown opposed to his plan, appointing new lord-lieutenants of counties and remodelling the corporations governing towns and livery companies. In October, James gave orders for the lord-lieutenants to provide three standard questions to all Justices of the Peace: 1. Would they consent to the repeal of the Test Act and the Penal Laws? 2. Would they assist candidates who would do so? 3. Would they accept the Declaration of Indulgence? During the first three months of 1688, hundreds of those who gave negative replies to those questions were dismissed. Corporations were purged by agents, known as the Regulators, who were given wide discretionary powers, in an attempt to create a permanent royal electoral machine. Most of the regulators were Baptists, and the new town officials that they recommended included Quakers, Baptists, Congregationalists, Presbyterians and Roman Catholics, as well as Anglicans. Finally, on 24 August 1688, James ordered the issue of writs for a general election. However, upon realising in September that William of Orange was going to land in England, James withdrew the writs and subsequently wrote to the lord-lieutenants to inquire over allegations of abuses committed during the regulations and election preparations, as part of the concessions he made to win support.

=== Deposition and the Glorious Revolution ===
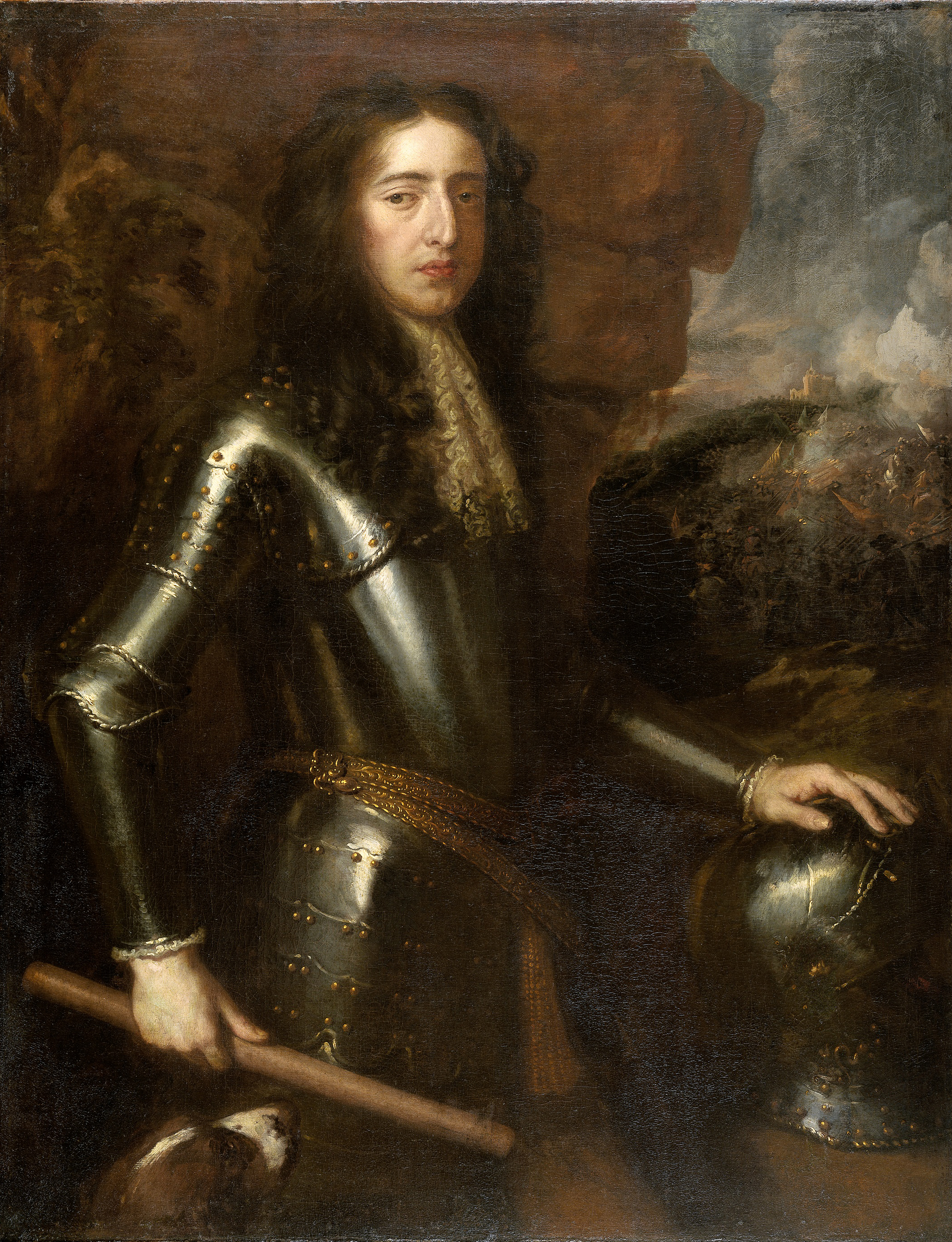
James's nephew and son-in-law, William of Orange, was invited to "save the Protestant religion".

In April 1688, James re-issued the Declaration of Indulgence, subsequently ordering Anglican clergy to read it in their churches. When seven bishops, including the Archbishop of Canterbury, submitted a petition requesting the reconsideration of the King's religious policies, they were arrested and tried for seditious libel. Public alarm increased when Queen Mary gave birth to a Roman Catholic son and heir, James Francis Edward, on 10 June that year. When James's only possible successors were his two Protestant daughters, Anglicans could see his pro-Catholic policies as a temporary phenomenon, but when the prince's birth opened the possibility of a permanent Roman Catholic dynasty, such men had to reconsider their position. Threatened by a Roman Catholic dynasty, several influential Protestants claimed the child was supposititious and had been smuggled into the Queen's bedchamber in a warming pan. They had already entered into negotiations with the Prince of Orange when it became known the Queen was pregnant, and the birth of a son reinforced their convictions.

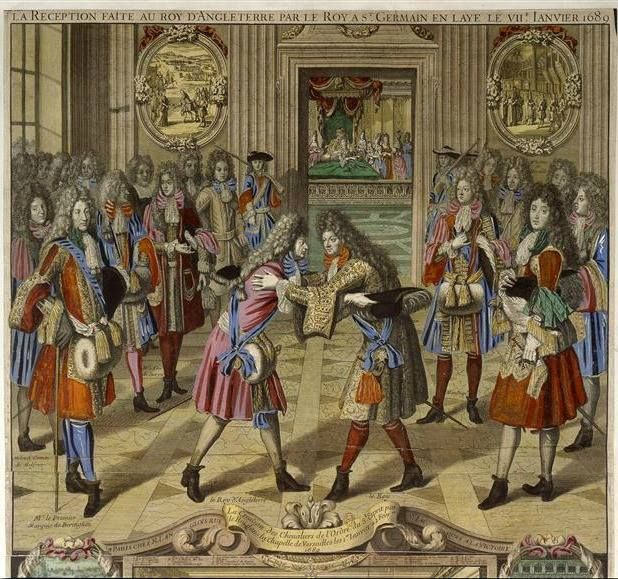
Louis XIV greeting the exiled James II in 1689 ("La Reception faite au Roy d'Angleterre par le Roy à St. Germain en Laye le VIIe janvier 1689", engraving by Nicolas Langlois, 1690)

On 30 June 1688, a group of seven Protestant nobles invited William, Prince of Orange, to come to England with an army. By September, it had become clear that William sought to invade. Believing that his own army would be adequate, James refused the assistance of King Louis XIV of France, fearing that the English would oppose French intervention. When William arrived on 5 November 1688, many Protestant officers, including Churchill, defected and joined William, as did James's own daughter Anne. James lost his nerve and declined to attack the invading army, despite his army's numerical superiority. On 11 December, James tried to flee to France, first throwing the Great Seal of the Realm into the River Thames. He was captured in Kent; later, he was released and placed under Dutch protective guard. Having no desire to make James a martyr, William let him escape on 23 December. James was received by his cousin and ally, Louis XIV, who offered him a palace and a pension.

William summoned a Convention Parliament to decide how to handle James's flight. It convened on 22 January 1689. While the Parliament refused to depose him, they declared that James, having fled to France and dropped the Great Seal into the Thames, had effectively abdicated, and that the throne had thereby become vacant. (Note: Harris analyses the legal nature of the abdication; James did not agree that he had abdicated.) To fill this vacancy, James's daughter Mary was declared Queen; she was to rule jointly with her husband William, who would be King. On 11 April 1689, the Parliament of Scotland declared James to have forfeited the throne of Scotland as well. The Convention Parliament issued a Declaration of Right on 12 February that denounced James for abusing his power, and proclaimed many limitations on royal authority. The abuses charged to James included the suspension of the Test Acts, the prosecution of the Seven Bishops for merely petitioning the Crown, the establishment of a standing army, and the imposition of cruel punishments. The Declaration was the basis for the Bill of Rights enacted later in 1689. The Bill also declared that henceforth, no Roman Catholic was permitted to ascend the English throne.

== Attempt to regain the throne ==
=== War in Ireland ===
The Battle of the Boyne, at which James II suffered a decisive defeat

With the assistance of French troops, James landed in Ireland in March 1689. The Irish Parliament did not follow the example of the English Parliament; it declared that James remained King and passed The Great Act of Attainder against those who had rebelled against him. At James's urging, the Irish Parliament passed an Act for Liberty of Conscience that granted religious freedom to all Roman Catholics and Protestants in Ireland. James worked to build an army in Ireland, but was ultimately defeated at the Battle of the Boyne on 1 July 1690 O.S. when William arrived, personally leading an army to defeat James and reassert English control. James fled to France once more, departing from Kinsale, never to return to any of his former kingdoms. Because he deserted his Irish supporters, James became known in Ireland as Séamus an Chaca or "James the shit". Despite this popular perception, later historian Breandán Ó Buachalla argues that "Irish political poetry for most of the eighteenth century is essentially Jacobite poetry", and both Ó Buachalla and fellow-historian Éamonn Ó Ciardha argue that James and his successors played a central role as messianic figures throughout the 18th century for all classes in Ireland.

=== Return to exile, death and legacy ===
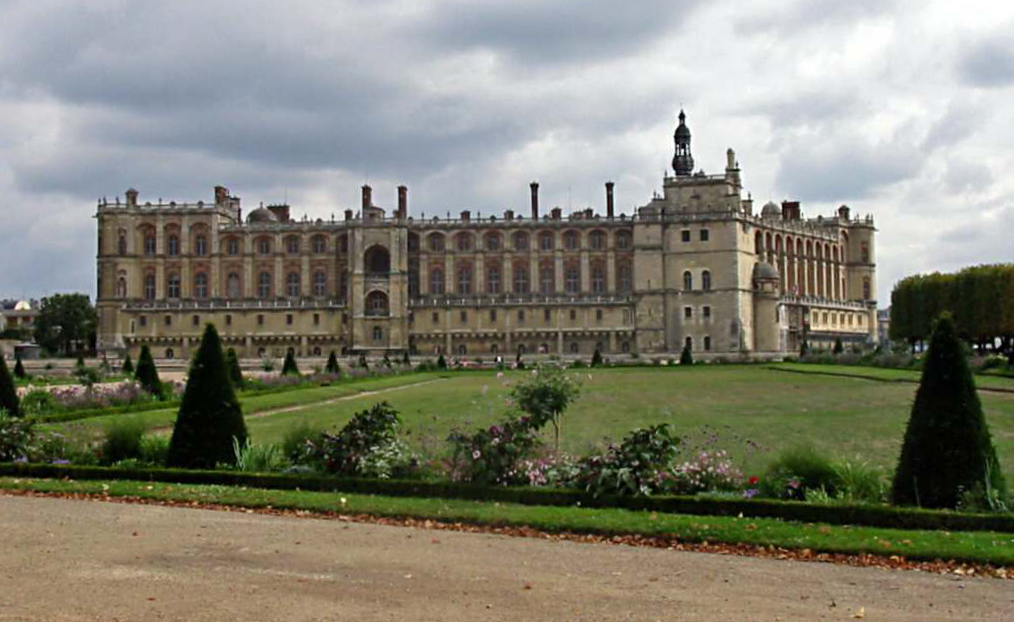
The Château de Saint-Germain-en-Laye, James's home during his final exile

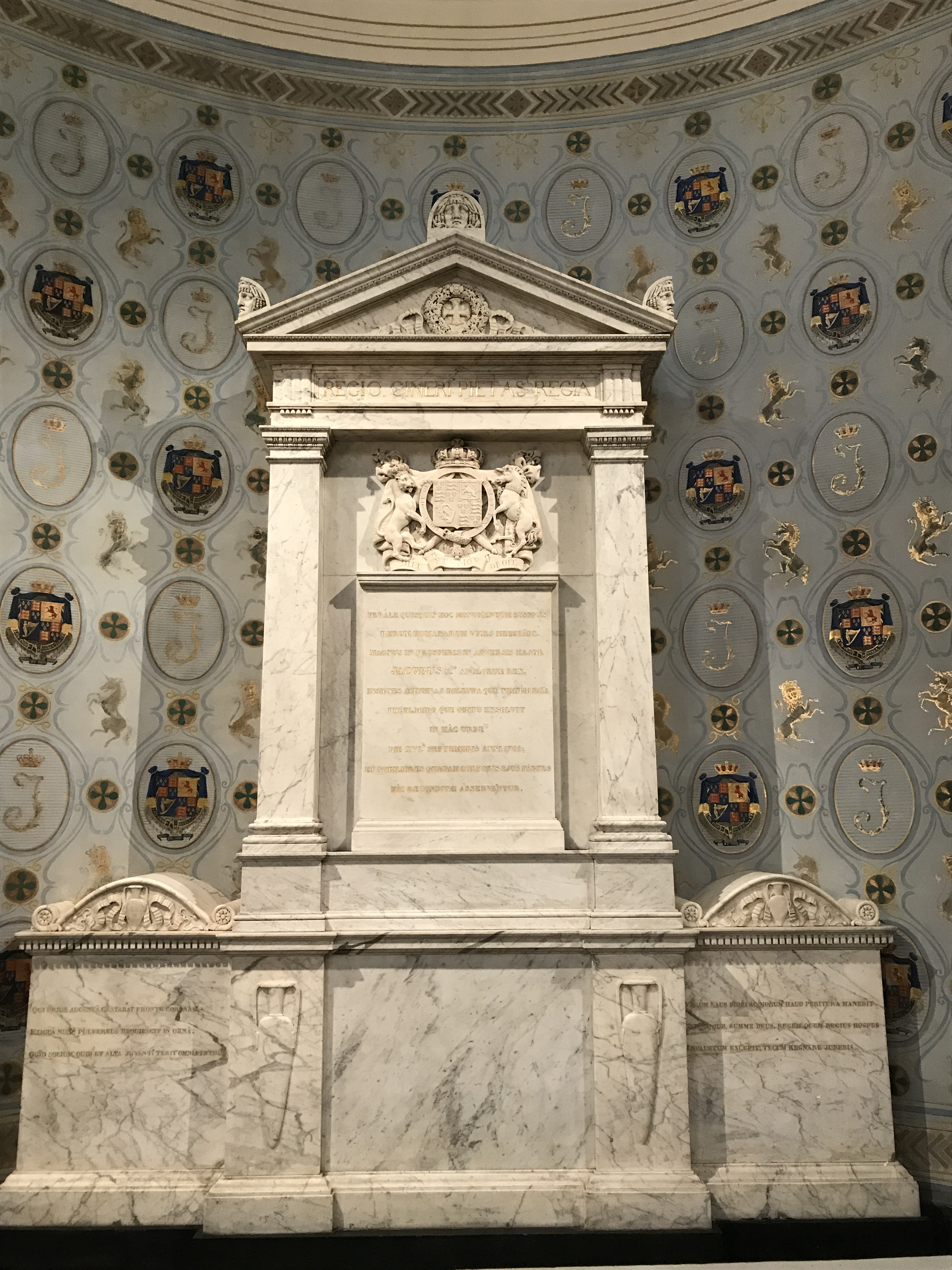
Tomb of James II and VII in the parish church of Saint-Germain-en-Laye, commissioned in 1828 by George IV when the church was rebuilt

In France, James was allowed to live in the royal château of Saint-Germain-en-Laye. James's wife and some of his supporters fled with him, including the Earl of Melfort; most, but not all, were Roman Catholic. In 1692, James's last child, Louisa Maria Teresa, was born. Some supporters in England attempted to assassinate William III and II to restore James to the throne in 1696, but the plot failed and the backlash made James's cause less popular, though he never supported it himself. In the same year, Louis XIV offered to have James elected as King of Poland. James rejected the offer, fearing that accepting the Polish crown might (in the minds of the English people) disqualify him from being King of England. After Louis concluded peace with William in 1697, he ceased to offer much assistance to James.

During his last years, James lived as an austere penitent. He wrote a memorandum for his son advising him on how to govern England, specifying that Catholics should possess one Secretary of State, one Commissioner of the Treasury, the Secretary at War, with the majority of the officers in the army.

James died on 16 September 1701 of a brain haemorrhage at Saint-Germain-en-Laye, aged 67. Against his wishes, his heart was placed in a silver-gilt locket and given to the convent at Chaillot, while his brain was placed in a lead casket and given to the Scots College in Paris. His entrails were divided between two gilt urns, sent to the parish church of Saint-Germain-en-Laye and the English Jesuit college at Saint-Omer, and the flesh from his right arm was given to the English Augustinian nuns of Paris.

The rest of James's body was laid to rest in a triple sarcophagus (consisting of two wooden coffins and one of lead) at the St Edmund's Chapel in the Church of the English Benedictines in the Rue Saint-Jacques, Paris, with a funeral oration by Henri-Emmanuel de Roquette. James was not buried, but put in one of the side chapels. Lights were kept burning round his coffin until the French Revolution. In 1734, the Archbishop of Paris heard evidence to support James's canonisation, but nothing came of it. During the French Revolution, James's tomb was raided.

The Italian composer Angelo Olivieri was commissioned to write a Requiem mass in honor of James in 1702. It was performed at the San Lorenzo in Lucina.

== Later Hanover succession ==
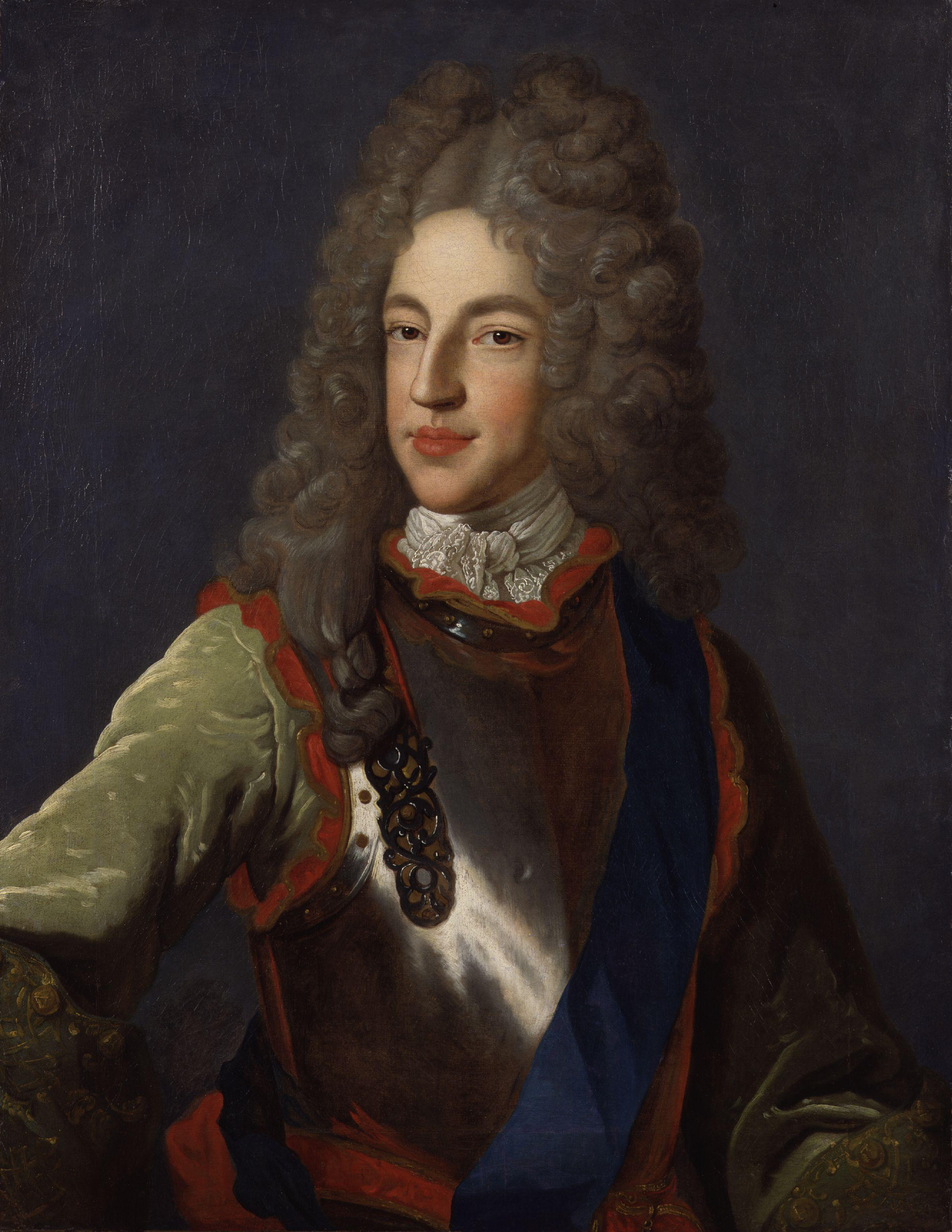
James's son was known as "James III and VIII" to his supporters, and "The Old Pretender" to his enemies.

James's younger daughter Anne succeeded when William died in 1702. The Act of Settlement provided that, if the line of succession established in the Bill of Rights were extinguished, the crown would go to a German cousin, Sophia, Electress of Hanover, and to her Protestant heirs. Sophia was a granddaughter of James VI and I through his eldest daughter, Elizabeth Stuart, the sister of Charles I. Thus, when Anne died in 1714 (less than two months after the death of Sophia), she was succeeded by George I, Sophia's son, the Elector of Hanover and Anne's second cousin.

== Subsequent uprisings and pretenders ==
James's son James Francis Edward was recognised as king at his father's death by Louis XIV of France and James II's remaining supporters (later known as Jacobites) as "James III and VIII". He led a rising in Scotland in 1715 shortly after George I's accession, but was defeated. His son Charles Edward Stuart led a Jacobite rising in 1745, but was again defeated. The risings were the last serious attempts to restore the Stuart dynasty.

Charles's claims passed to his younger brother Henry Benedict Stuart, the Dean of the College of Cardinals of the Roman Catholic Church. Henry was the last of James II's legitimate descendants. He died childless, and no relative has publicly acknowledged the Jacobite claim since his death in 1807.

== Historiography ==
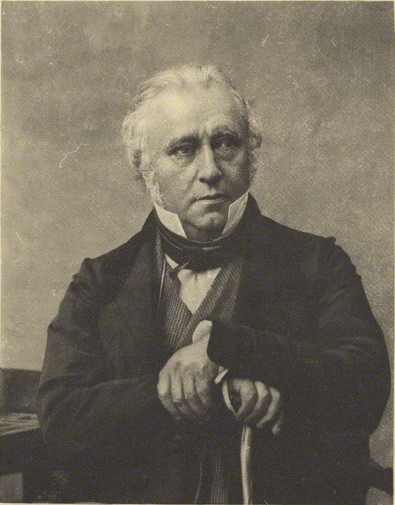
Macaulay wrote in the Whig tradition.

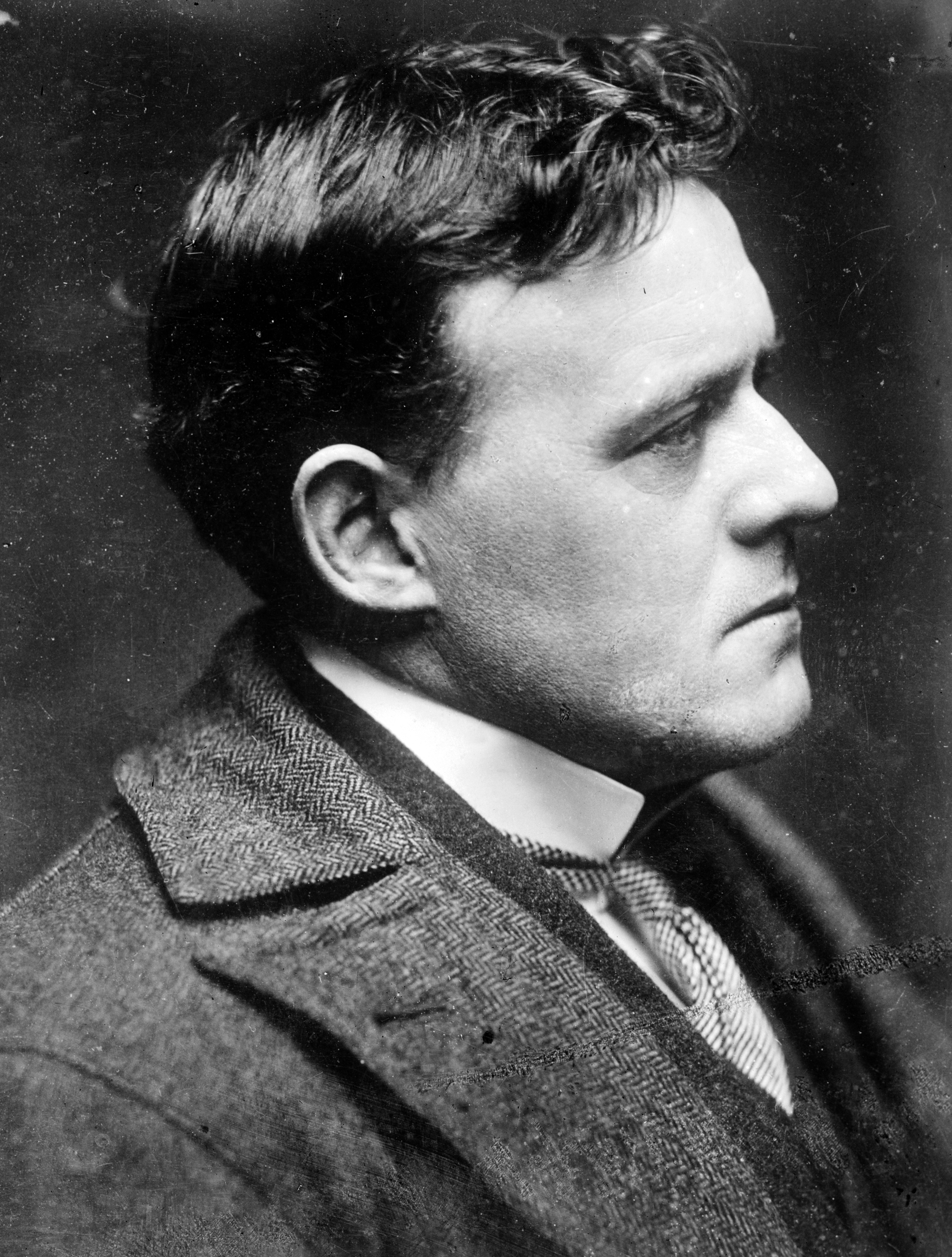
Belloc was a notable apologist for James II.

Historical analysis of James II has been somewhat revised since Whig historians, led by Lord Macaulay, cast James as a cruel absolutist and his reign as "tyranny which approached to insanity". Subsequent scholars, such as G. M. Trevelyan (Macaulay's great-nephew) and David Ogg, while more balanced than Macaulay, still characterised James as a tyrant, his attempts at religious tolerance as a fraud, and his reign as an aberration in the course of British history. In 1892, A. W. Ward wrote for the Dictionary of National Biography that James was "obviously a political and religious bigot", although never devoid of "a vein of patriotic sentiment"; "his conversion to the church of Rome made the emancipation of his fellow-catholics in the first instance, and the recovery of England for catholicism in the second, the governing objects of his policy."

Hilaire Belloc, a writer and Catholic apologist, broke with this tradition in 1928, casting James as an honourable man and a true advocate for freedom of conscience, and his enemies "men in the small clique of great fortunes ... which destroyed the ancient monarchy of the English". However, he observed that James "concluded the Catholic church to be the sole authoritative voice on earth, and thenceforward ... he not only stood firm against surrender but on no single occasion contemplated the least compromise or by a word would modify the impression made."

By the 1960s and 1970s, Maurice Ashley and Stuart Prall began to reconsider James's motives in granting religious toleration, while still taking note of James's autocratic rule. Modern historians have moved away from the school of thought that preached the continuous march of progress and democracy, Ashley contending that "history is, after all, the story of human beings and individuals, as well as of the classes and the masses." He cast James II and William III as "men of ideals as well as human weaknesses". John Miller, writing in 2000, accepted the claims of James's absolutism, but argued that "his main concern was to secure religious liberty and civil equality for Catholics. Any 'absolutist' methods ... were essentially means to that end."

In 2004, W. A. Speck wrote in the new Oxford Dictionary of National Biography that "James was genuinely committed to religious toleration, but also sought to increase the power of the crown." He added that, unlike the government of the Netherlands, "James was too autocratic to combine freedom of conscience with popular government. He resisted any check on the monarch's power. That is why his heart was not in the concessions he had to make in 1688. He would rather live in exile with his principles intact than continue to reign as a limited monarch."

Tim Harris's conclusions from his 2006 book summarised the ambivalence of modern scholarship towards James II:

The jury will doubtless remain out on James for a long time ... Was he an egotistical bigot ... a tyrant who rode roughshod over the will of the vast majority of his subjects (at least in England and Scotland) ... simply naïve, or even perhaps plain stupid, unable to appreciate the realities of political power ... Or was he a well-intentioned and even enlightened ruler—an enlightened despot well ahead of his time, perhaps—who was merely trying to do what he thought was best for his subjects?

In 2009, Steven Pincus confronted that scholarly ambivalence in 1688: The First Modern Revolution. Pincus claims that James's reign must be understood within a context of economic change and European politics, and makes two major assertions about James II. The first of these is that James purposefully "followed the French Sun King, Louis XIV, in trying to create a modern Catholic polity. This involved not only trying to Catholicise England ... but also creating a modern, centralising, and extremely bureaucratic state apparatus." The second is that James was undone in 1688 far less by Protestant reaction against Catholicisation than by nationwide hostile reaction against his intrusive bureaucratic state and taxation apparatus, expressed in massive popular support for William of Orange's armed invasion of England. Pincus presents James as neither naïve nor stupid nor egotistical. Instead, readers are shown an intelligent, clear-thinking strategically motivated monarch whose vision for a French authoritarian political model and alliance clashed with, and lost out to, alternative views that favoured an entrepreneurial Dutch economic model, feared French power, and were outraged by James's authoritarianism.

Scott Sowerby countered Pincus's thesis in 2013 in Making Toleration: The Repealers and the Glorious Revolution. He noted that English taxes remained low during James II's reign, at about 4% of the English national income, and thus it was unlikely that James could have built a bureaucratic state on the model of Louis XIV's France, where taxes were at least twice as high as a proportion of GDP. Sowerby also contends that James's policies of religious toleration attracted substantial support from religious nonconformists, including Quakers, Baptists, Congregationalists and Presbyterians, who were attracted by the king's push for a new "Magna Carta for liberty of conscience". The king was overthrown, in Sowerby's view, largely because of fears among the Dutch and English elites that James might be aligning himself with Louis XIV in a supposed "holy league" to destroy Protestantism across northern Europe. Sowerby presents James's reign as a struggle between those who believed that the king was sincerely devoted to liberty of conscience and those who were sceptical of the king's espousals of toleration and believed that he had a hidden agenda to overthrow English Protestantism.

== Titles, styles, honours, and arms ==
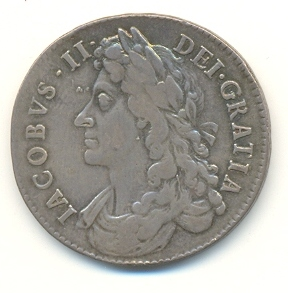
Half crown coin of James II, 1686

=== Titles and styles ===
- 14 October 1633 – 6 February 1685: The Duke of York
- 10 May 1659 – 6 February 1685: The Earl of Ulster
- 31 December 1660 – 6 February 1685: The Duke of Albany
- 6 February 1685 – 23 December 1688 (by Jacobites until 16 September 1701): His Majesty The King

The official style of James in England was "James the Second, by the Grace of God, King of England, Scotland, France and Ireland, Defender of the Faith, etc." The claim to France was only nominal, and was asserted by every English king from Edward III to George III, regardless of the amount of French territory actually controlled. In Scotland, he was "James the Seventh, by the Grace of God, King of Scotland, England, France and Ireland, Defender of the Faith, etc."

James was created Duke of Normandy by King Louis XIV of France on 31 December 1660.

In 1734 the Archbishop of Paris opened the cause for beatification of James, titling him a Servant of God.

=== Honours ===
- KG: Knight of the Garter, 20 April 1642

Appointments

- Lord Warden of the Cinque Ports, 1660–1669

=== Arms ===
Prior to his accession, James's coat of arms was the royal arms (which he later inherited), differenced by a label of three points Ermine. His arms as king were: Quarterly, I and IV Grandquarterly, Azure three fleurs-de-lis Or (for France) and Gules three lions passant guardant in pale Or (for England); II Or a lion rampant within a double tressure flory-counter-flory Gules (for Scotland); III Azure a harp Or stringed Argent (for Ireland).

James II's coat of arms

Coat of arms of James, Duke of York, KG

Coat of arms of James II as king (outside Scotland)

Coat of arms of King James VII in Scotland

== Family tree ==
In four generations of Stuarts, there were seven reigning monarchs (not including Hanover's George I). James II was the fourth Stuart monarch in England, the second of his generation and the father of two more.

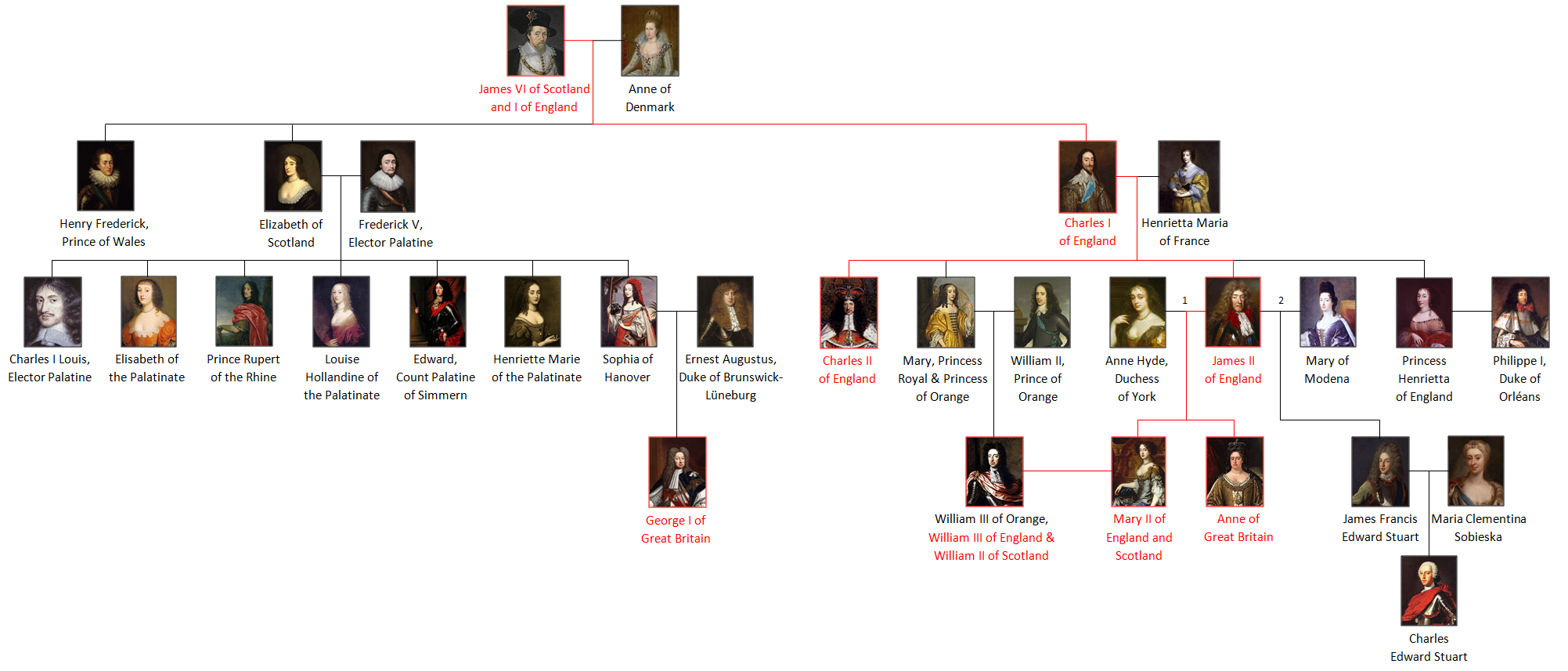
Principal members of the House of Stuart following the 1603 Union of the Crowns

== Issue ==
=== Legitimate issue ===
| Name | Birth | Death | Notes |
|---|---|---|---|
By Anne Hyde
| Charles, Duke of Cambridge | 22 October 1660 | 5 May 1661 | |
| Mary II | 30 April 1662 | 28 December 1694 | married 1677, William III, Prince of Orange; no issue |
| James, Duke of Cambridge | 11 or 12 July 1663 | 20 June 1667 | |
| Anne, Queen of Great Britain | 6 February 1665 | 1 August 1714 | married 1683, Prince George of Denmark; no surviving issue |
| Charles, Duke of Kendal | 4 July 1666 | 22 May 1667 | |
| Edgar, Duke of Cambridge | 14 September 1667 | 8 June 1671 | |
| Henrietta | 13 January 1669 | 15 November 1669 | |
| Catherine | 9 February 1671 | 5 December 1671 | |
By Mary of Modena
| Unnamed child | March or May 1674 | | stillbirth |
| Catherine Laura | 10 January 1675 | 3 October 1675 | died of convulsions |
| Unnamed child | October 1675 | | stillbirth |
| Isabel (or Isabella) | 28 August 1676 | 2 or 4 March 1681 | buried in Westminster Abbey on 4 March (Old Style) as "The Lady Isabella, daughter to the Duke of York" |
| Charles, Duke of Cambridge | 7 November 1677 | 12 December 1677 | died of smallpox |
| Elizabeth | c. 1678 | | |
| Unnamed child | February 1681 | | stillbirth |
| Charlotte Maria | 16 August 1682 | 16 October 1682 | died of convulsions and buried in Westminster Abbey on 8 October (Old Style) as "The Lady Charlotte-Marie, daughter to the Duke of York" |
| Unnamed child | October 1683 | | stillbirth |
| Unnamed child | May 1684 | | stillbirth |
| James, Prince of Wales "the Old Pretender" | 10 June 1688 | 1 January 1766 | married 1719, Clementina Sobieska; had issue |
| Louisa Maria Teresa | 28 June 1692 | 18 April 1712 | no issue |

=== Illegitimate issue ===
| Name | Birth | Death | Notes |
|---|---|---|---|
By Arabella Churchill
| Henrietta FitzJames | 1667 | 3 April 1730 | Married, firstly, Henry Waldegrave; had issue. Married, secondly, Piers Butler, 3rd Viscount Galmoye; no issue. |
| James FitzJames, 1st Duke of Berwick | 21 August 1670 | 12 June 1734 | Married, firstly, Lady Honora Burke (a.k.a. Lady Honora de Burgh) and had issue. Married, secondly, Anne Bulkely and had issue. |
| Henry FitzJames, 1st Duke of Albemarle | August 1673 | December 1702 | Married Marie Gabrielle d'Audibert de Lussan; had issue. |
| Arabella FitzJames | 1674 | 7 November 1704 | Became a nun under the name Ignatia. |
By Catherine Sedley
| Catherine Darnley | c. 1681 | 13 March 1743 | Alleged daughter. Married, firstly, James Annesley, 3rd Earl of Anglesey and had issue. Married, secondly, John Sheffield, 1st Duke of Buckingham and Normanby and had issue. |
| James Darnley | 1684 | 22 April 1685 | |
| Charles Darnley | | | Died young |

== Sources ==
- Anderson, R C (1946). Journals and Narratives of the Third Dutch War (PDF). London: Navy Records Society. p. 96.
- Ashley, Maurice (1996). The Glorious Revolution of 1688. Charles Scribner's Sons. ISBN 0-340-00896-2.
- Barry, Quintin (2018). From Solebay to the Texel: the third Anglo-Dutch war, 1672-1674. Warwick: Helion & Company. ISBN 9781911628033.
- Callow, John (2000). The Making of King James II: The Formative Years of a King. Sutton. ISBN 0-7509-2398-9.
- Davies, J. D. (2008). Pepys's navy: ships, men & warfare, 1649-1689. Barnsley: Seaforth Pub. ISBN 978-1-84832-014-7.
- Davies, J. D. (2017). Kings of the sea: Charles II, James II and the Royal Navy. Barnsley: Seaforth Publishing. ISBN 978-1-84832-400-8.
- Devine, T. M. (2006). The Scottish Nation 1700–2007. Penguin. ISBN 0-1410-2769-X.
- Harris, Tim (2006). Revolution: The Great Crisis of the British Monarchy, 1685–1720. Allen Lane. ISBN 0-7139-9759-1.
- Hilliam, David (1998). Kings, Queens, Bones & Bastards. Sutton. ISBN 0-7509-3553-7.
- Jones, J. R. (1988). The Revolution of 1688 in England. Orion Publishing Group, Limited. ISBN 0-2979-9467-0.
- Kenyon, J. P. (1986). The Stuart Constitution 1603–1688, Documents and Commentary (2nd ed.). Cambridge University Press. ISBN 0-521-31327-9.
- MacLeod, John (1999). Dynasty, the Stuarts, 1560–1807. Sceptre. ISBN 0-3407-0767-4.
- Macaulay, Thomas Babington (1889). The History of England from the Accession of James the Second (Popular in two volumes ed.). Longmans.
- Mann, Alastair (2014). James VII: Duke and King of Scots, 1633–1701. John Donald. ISBN 978-1-907-90909-2.
- Miller, John (2000). James II (3rd ed.). Yale University Press. ISBN 0-300-08728-4.
- Ó Buachalla, Breandán (1996), Aisling ghéar: na Stíobhartaigh agus an taos léinn, 1603–1788 (in Irish), An Clóchomhar, ISBN 0-903-75899-7
- Ó Ciardha, Éamonn (2002), Ireland and the Jacobite Cause, 1685–1766, Dublin: Four Courts Press, ISBN 1-851-82534-7
- Prall, Stuart (1972). The Bloodless Revolution: England, 1688. Univ of Wisconsin Press. ISBN 978-0-299-10294-4.
- Royle, Trevor (2004). The British Civil Wars: The Wars of the Three Kingdoms, 1638–1660. Macmillan. ISBN 0-312-29293-7.
- Sowerby, Scott (2013). Making Toleration: The Repealers and the Glorious Revolution. Harvard University Press. ISBN 978-0-674-07309-8.
- Tattersfield, Nigel (1991). The Forgotten trade: Comprising the log of the "Daniel and Henry" of 1700 and accounts of the slave trade from the minor ports of England, 1698-1725. London: J. Cape. ISBN 978-0224029155.
- Turner, Francis C. (1948). James II. Eyre and Spottiswoode. Available as POD e.g. ISBN 978-1-346-30578-3.
- Waller, Maureen (2002). Ungrateful Daughters: The Stuart Princesses who Stole Their Father's Crown. Macmillan. ISBN 0-312-30711-X.

James II of England House of Stuart Born: 14 October 1633 Died: 16 September 1701
Regnal titles
| Preceded by Charles II | King of England, Scotland and Ireland; 1685–1688 | Vacant Glorious Revolution Title next held by William III & II and Mary II |
Honorary titles
| Preceded by Heneage Finch, 3rd Earl of Winchilsea | Lord Warden of the Cinque Ports; 1660–1673 | Succeeded by John Beaumont |
Political offices
| Vacant Title last held by Francis Cottington, 1st Baron Cottington | Lord High Admiral of England; 1660–1673 | Succeeded by Charles II |
| Preceded by Charles Stewart, 6th Duke of Lennox | Lord High Admiral of Scotland; 1673–1688 | Vacant Title next held by William Hamilton, Duke of Hamilton |
| Preceded by John Maitland, 1st Duke of Lauderdale | Lord High Commissioner to the Parliament of Scotland; 1680–1685 | Succeeded by William Douglas, 1st Duke of Queensberry |
| Preceded by Charles II | Lord High Admiral of England; 1685–1688 | Succeeded by William III & II |
Titles in pretence
| Loss of title Glorious Revolution | — TITULAR — King of England, Scotland and Ireland; 1688–1701 | Succeeded by James Francis Edward Stuart as James III & VIII |
