= Godden v Hales =

Godden v Hales was a 1686 King's Bench case that was brought as a test case of the Test Acts, a series of penal laws in Restoration England that established religious tests for public office with explicitly anti-Catholic intentions. The case hinged on the king's supposedly inalienable prerogative to command the services of his subject, even contrary to acts of Parliament.

Prior to the trial, six of the twelve royal judges, including the chief justice of the Common Pleas and the Chief Baron of the Exchequer, were dismissed for refusing to promise to support the king's dispensing power. The case was then tried under the presiding Chief Justice Edward Herbert, with eleven of the twelve judges agreed for the defendant.

== Background ==
The case itself was orchestrated by James II. It concerned Sir Edward Hales, 3rd Baronet, who had converted to Catholicism prior to his appointment to a colonelcy in an infantry regiment on 28 November 1685. Three months later, he had not taken the religious oaths prescribed by the Test Act, as Hales had been appointed under a royal warrant that "dispens[ed him] from taking the Oaths of Allegiance and Supremacy etc. required by various Acts of Parliament". Arthur Godden was Hales's footman who agreed to act as the informer for the reward allowed under the Test Act of 1671.

The Crown struggled to find a barrister willing to plead the case; numerous notable Whig lawyers refused to participate in the trial and thereby legitimize the trial. Ultimately, a Mr. Northley agreed to act as Godden's counsel. Sir Thomas Powys, recently appointed as the Solicitor-General, argued for the defense.

== Trial ==
On 21 June, Chief Justice Herbert delivered the court's decision: that the kings of England were sovereign princes and that the laws were the king's laws. Therefore, the king had "an inseparable prerogative ... to dispense with penal laws in particular cases and upon particular necessary reasons".

== Legacy ==
The implication of Godden v Hales was that ultimate legal power rested with the king, who could, at any point, 'dispense', with the measure that Parliament had enacted. The case's verdict and its implications were seen as intolerable to many members of both the House of Commons and the House of Lords; the dispensation in Godden v Hales and James II's disregard of parliamentary authority ultimately triggered the revolution in 1688. The decision upheld the dispensing power of James II, who then proceeded to name various Catholics to his Privy Council and to other governmental posts.

In a proclamation on 4 April 1687, James declared that all ecclesiastical penal laws were suspended and offered a general pardon to anyone who had incurred penalties from the laws. The oaths of the Test Act were no longer required to take civil or military office.

On 27 April, James issued a second proclamation that confirmed his declaration and ordered that the proclamation be read during the service in all the churches throughout England, with bishops directed to send out copies of the proclamation. The Archbishop of Canterbury, as well as six other bishops, protested and asked the king not to insist that the 4 April declaration be published. James refused charged all the bishops with seditious libel. The bishops were tried in the Court of King's Bench at the end of June and acquitted. The bishops' trial focused less on the libel itself, which was never proved, and more on whether the bishops had been guilty of sedition by suggesting that the king's dispensing power was particular, rather than general.

Within six months of the bishops' trial, James II had been deposed by the Glorious Revolution. Reversing the verdict of Godden v Hales and denying the legal validity of its judgement were important aspects of the revolution that were targeted in Article 1 of the Bill of Rights 1689: "That the pretended power of suspending the laws or the execution of laws by regal authority without consent of Parliament is illegal."
