= Henri-Emmanuel de Roquette =

Henri-Emmanuel de Roquette (c. 1655 – 4 March 1725) was a French churchman.

A doctor at the Sorbonne and a preacher, he became abbot of the abbey of Saint-Gildas-de-Rhuys in 1681 and attended the Paris salon of the marquise de Lambert. In 1702 he spoke the funeral oration for James II of England and he served as secretary to the 1705 general assembly of the French clergy in 1705. He was elected a member of the Académie Française in 1720.
