= Breandán Ó Buachalla =

Professor of Irish (1936-2010)

- Born: 1936; Cork, Ireland
- Died: 20 May 2010 (aged 73–74)
- Education: University College Cork
- Known for: Academia
- Notable work: Aisling Ghéar
- Spouse: Aingeal Ó Buachalla
- Children: Traolach, Clíona & Brídóg

Breandán Ó Buachalla (1936 – 20 May 2010) was an Irish scholar of the Irish language. According to Raidió Teilifís Éireann, he was "the leading authority on Gaelic poetry and writing in early modern Ireland" and "one of the most prominent Irish language academics of his generation". The Irish Times described him as "eminent". His magnum opus was his seventeenth century literary and political study, Aisling Ghéar.

Ó Buachalla was born in Cork City in 1936 and went to school at Saint Nessan's Christian Brothers School. He attended University College Cork from which he obtained a degree in Celtic studies. He taught at Queen's University Belfast and was a professor of Irish at the Dublin Institute for Advanced Studies's School of Celtic Studies for five years between 1973 and 1978. Following this Ó Buachalla was Professor of Modern Irish Language and Literature at University College Dublin for eighteen years between 1978 and 1996. He was a visiting professor at three institutes in the United States: these were the University of Notre Dame, New York University, and Boston College. He also achieved the Parnell Fellowship at the University of Cambridge in the United Kingdom. At the time of his death, he was Professor of Irish at the University of Notre Dame, the only faculty of Modern Irish language outside Ireland.

He was married to Aingeal, who outlived him. The couple had three children, daughters, Bridóg and Clíona, and son, Traolach. Among his other works are I mBéal Feirste Cois Cuain, Peadar Ó Doirnín: amhráin, Nua-Dhuanaire II, Cathal Buí: amhráin, and Na Stíobhartaigh agus an tAos Léinn: King Seamas.

Breandán Ó Buachalla died on 20 May 2010 after suffering a brain haemorrhage at his home in Dublin. He was 74. Following his death, Minister for Tourism, Culture and Sport, Mary Hanafin, paid tribute.
