= John Fretwell Sporting Complex =

Cricket ground near Market Warsop

Coordinates: 53°11′35″N 1°10′34″W

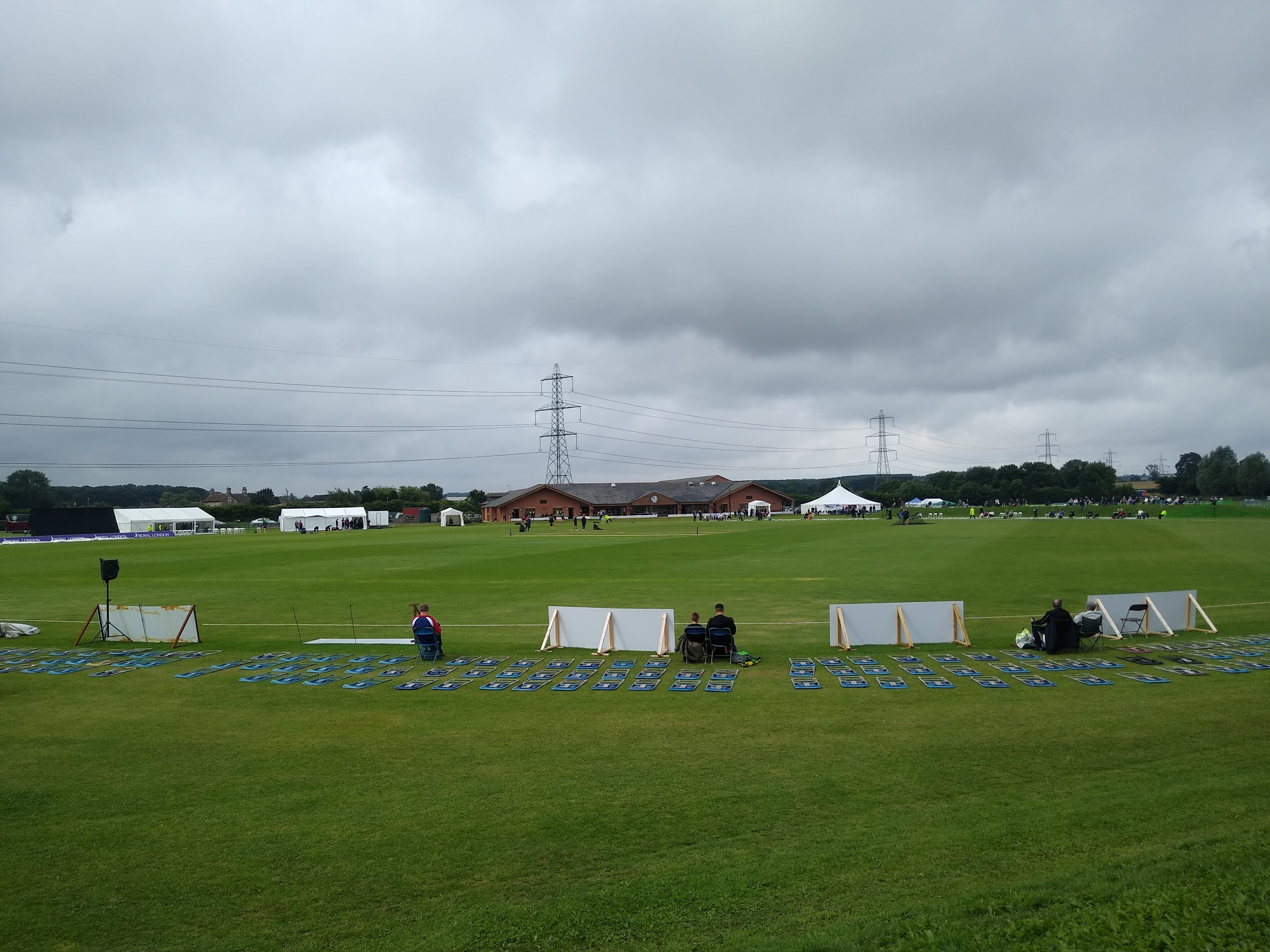
- John Fretwell Sporting Complex in 2021

Ground information
- Location: Nettleworth, Warsop, Nottinghamshire
- Home club: Welbeck
- County club: Nottinghamshire
- Establishment: 2007
- End names
- Charlie French End; Leeming Lane End

Team information
Nottinghamshire	(2015–present)
Nottinghamshire Women	(2009–present)
- As of 25 July 2016; Source: CricketArchive

The John Fretwell Sporting Complex is a cricket ground and clubhouse complex located at Sookholme, near Spion Kop in Warsop parish, Nottinghamshire, England. The ground, which also has facilities for football and bowls, is the home of Welbeck Cricket Club and has been used by Nottinghamshire County Cricket Club for some List A fixtures since 2015.

The ground was developed by retired local businessman John Fretwell, a former Welbeck cricketer who wanted to create a new facility for the local community. Welbeck Colliery Cricket Club — as they were then known — were felt to have outgrown the facilities at their Oakfield Lane ground in Market Warsop. Fretwell identified a site on farmland off Sookholme Road where the new complex was constructed in 2006. Welbeck Colliery began to play at the ground from the beginning of the 2007 season.

Part of Fretwell's vision for the ground was to bring county cricket back to the north of Nottinghamshire, which was achieved in 2015. Prior to then, Nottinghamshire had not played a home match anywhere other than Trent Bridge since 2004, and not at another ground in their own county since 1998. The inaugural "Welbeck Weekender" took place in July 2015, with Royal London One-Day Cup matches on consecutive days against Warwickshire and Glamorgan. in July 2016, Nottinghamshire faced Derbyshire in the same competition. Nottinghamshire have also used the ground for Second XI fixtures several times since 2008.

Nottinghamshire Women played their first Women's County Championship match at Welbeck in 2009 and have used the ground regularly since 2013.

== Financial activities ==
The complex is a registered charity. During the financial year of 2022–2023, it raised £66,725 and had expenditure of £130,876. The complex is also commercially active as a hospitality venue. A 2019 charity fundraiser benefitting The Stroke Association featured local boxer Steve Ward.
