= Meden School =

State senior school in Warsop, Nottinghamshire

Location
- Burns Lane, Warsop; Mansfield, Nottinghamshire, NG20 0QN; England; 53°12′33″N 1°08′57″W

Information
- Type: Academy
- Local authority: Nottinghamshire
- Trust: Nova Education Trust
- Department for Education URN: 138411 Tables
- Ofsted: Reports
- Head teacher: Simon Morton
- Gender: Mixed
- Age: 11 to 18
- Enrolment: 860 (2014 Ofsted report)
- Director of School Improvement (Inclusion): Ryan Hawley
- Website: Meden School

Meden School is a mixed secondary school and sixth form in Market Warsop, Nottinghamshire, England, with 860 pupils at the Ofsted report of 2014, of which 116 were sixth-formers. The school is a member of the Nova Education Trust, which includes Birklands Primary in Warsop.

== History ==
The local area is historically a coal-mining area in the greater Mansfield district, with nearby Welbeck Colliery at Meden Vale closing in 2010.

The school opened as the Meden Comprehensive School on 7 September 1965. The official opening took place on 8 June 1966 attended by the secretary to the Council for Education in World Citizenship. The £253,000 building was built to withstand mining subsidence and had around 600 pupils. The school gained Technology specialist status in 2001 and was placed into special measures during 2011, becoming an academy under the Torch Academy Gateway Trust in 2012, which became known as the Nova Education Trust in 2014. The school had 860 pupils in 2014.

The school was built next to the main A60 road and near the River Meden with the Meden Sports Centre and small swimming pool integral to the site. It closed in 2018, and was replaced by a new facility with pool named Warsop Health Hub which opened in 2024, operated by Mansfield District Council's external leisure trust partner.

== Admissions ==
The school is led by Mr Simon Morton, successor to Jim Smith.

The school's college is led by Mrs Louisa Brett and Ms Holly Smith for year twelve and thirteen cohorts. Meden College provides each student has the use of a 'tablet' PC to help with studies. The college facilities have wireless access and a suite of computers.

The school was placed in special measures by OfSTED in 2010. Since being taken over by the Torch Academy Gateway Trust, Meden became one of the most improved school in the country, and in May 2012 was taken out of special measures due to the significant improvements that the school had made since being under new leadership. In 2012 the school secured the following results for key stage four (KS4) pupils;

Key Stage Four Academic Performance 5+ A*-C GCSEs (including English and Maths) = 6.7% 5+ A*-C GCSEs = 860% 3+ A*-A = 310%

Key Stage Five Academic Performance A2 Level – 100% Pass.

UCAS Performance – Double the acceptance ratio for Medicine and related courses, compared to the National Average – Double the acceptance ratio for Humanities and the Arts related courses, compared to the National Average. – 10% higher acceptance rate compared to National average for Biological Science courses. – 20% higher acceptance rate compared to National average for Maths and Maths related courses. – Higher than the National Average acceptance rates for Education, Engineering and Science related courses.

== Notable former pupils ==
- Jake Ball, cricketer, nephew of Bruce French
- Steve Frost, producer of Coronation Street
- Bruce French, former England cricketer, uncle of Jake Ball
- Neil Pointon, former Everton footballer
- Jamie Johnson, British Judoka
