= Market Warsop =

Town in North Nottinghamshire

Coordinates: 53.20°N 1.15°W

- Town
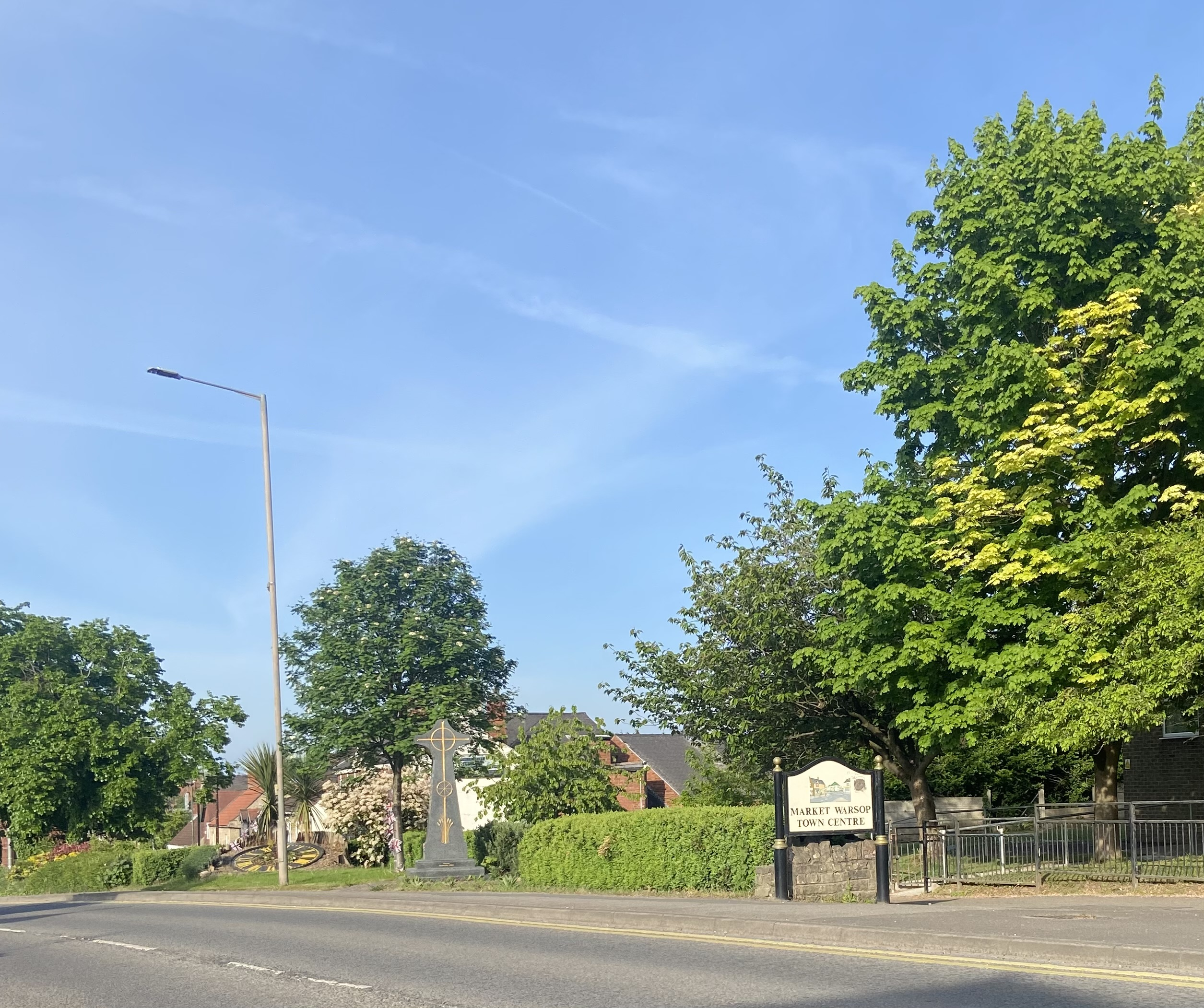
- Mansfield Road

- Location within Nottinghamshire
- Interactive map of Market Warsop
- OS grid reference: SK 568685
  - London: 125 mi (201 km) SE
- Civil parish: Warsop
- District: Mansfield
- Shire county: Nottinghamshire
- Region: East Midlands
- Country: England
- Sovereign state: United Kingdom
- Post town: MANSFIELD
- Postcode district: NG20
- Dialling code: 01623
- Police: Nottinghamshire
- Fire: Nottinghamshire
- Ambulance: East Midlands
- UK Parliament: Mansfield
- Website: warsopparishcouncil.co.uk

Market Warsop is a town within the civil parish of Warsop in Mansfield District, Nottinghamshire, England, on the outskirts of the remnants of Sherwood Forest. The adjacent villages in the parish are Church Warsop, Meden Vale, Sookholme, Warsop Vale and Spion Kop.

== Geography ==
Market Warsop is at the geographic centre of the Warsop civil parish, lying south of the River Meden. Church Warsop is to the north, while Spion Kop is to the south west. The town is the largest settlement in the parish.

== Etymology ==
The meaning of Warsop or (Wareshope as known in the Domesday Book in 1086). The name is said to derive from 'Waers Valley'. Waer being a minor leader of Anglican immigrants.

== History ==
Wareshope in the Domesday Book was recorded as being a settlement having a church named St Peter and St Paul. Today this appears where Church Warsop is. Market Warsop developed later after a Saturday market and two annual fairs were granted by the local lord and monarchs. By this time, this area grew up to the south of the river and was known as Warsop Fair Town, and later Market Warsop. The manor passed through to the de Roos family and their heirs the Earls of Rutland. The Knight family bought the manor In 1675, and in 1846 it was inherited by Sir Henry FitzHerbert of Tissington, the family continue hold much of the area into the present day.

The Parliament Oak is situated in Sherwood Forest near Market Warsop. It is reputed that King John in 1212 and King Edward I in 1290 had impromptu parliaments at the tree.

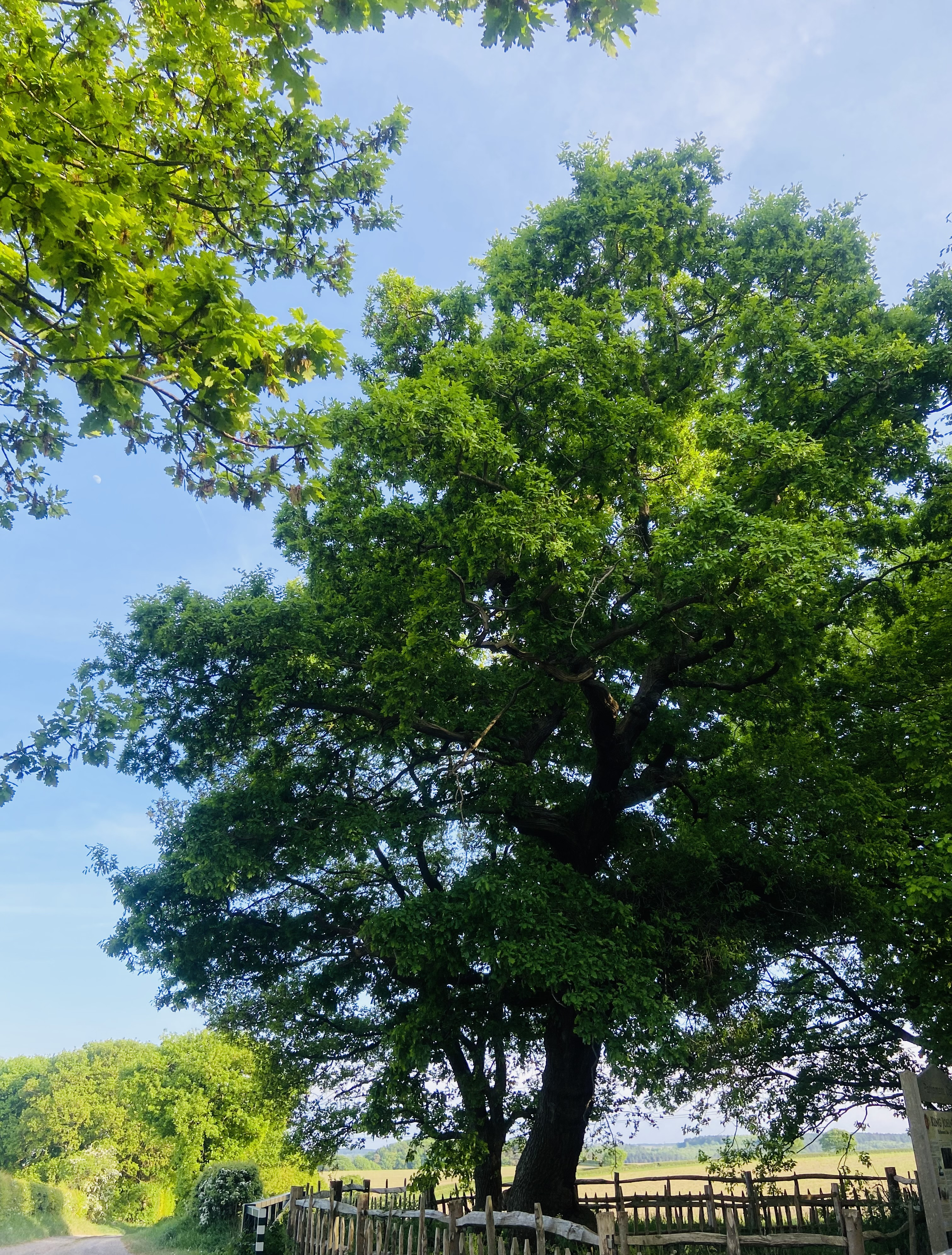
Parliament Oak, Peafield Lane

== Politics ==
Market Warsop is part of the Mansfield Parliamentary constituency from the 2010 boundary changes, represented by Labour's Steve Yemm after the July 2024 general election, and previously from 2017 to 2024 by Ben Bradley of the Conservative Party. It is in the civil parish of Warsop.

== Education ==
Market Warsop is home to Meden School on Burns Lane, part of a local group named Torch Academy Gateway Trust. Former pupils include television hosts Pollyanna Woodward and Simon Mapletoft, Mansfield 103.2 presenter Jason Harrison, Breakfast Show host Joe Sentance on Rother FM/Dearne FM, ex-Everton footballer Neil Pointon, former England wicketkeeper Bruce French and his nephew, and current England and Nottinghamshire fast bowler Jake Ball.
