= Warsop Vale =

Village in Nottinghamshire, England

Coordinates: 53.206°N 1.181°W

- Village
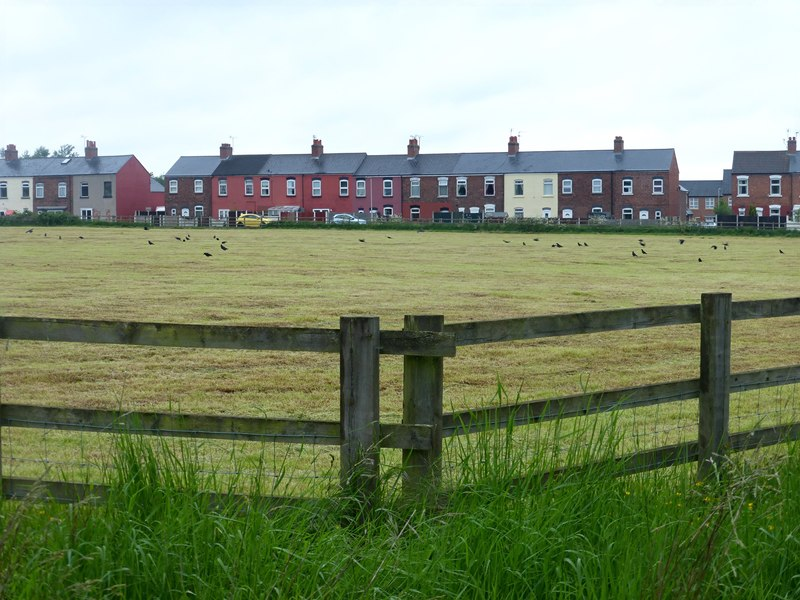
- West of Warsop Vale

- Location within Nottinghamshire
- Interactive map of Warsop Vale
- OS grid reference: SK 54787 67986
  - London: 120 mi (190 km) SSE
- Civil parish: Warsop
- District: Mansfield
- Shire county: Nottinghamshire
- Region: East Midlands
- Country: England
- Sovereign state: United Kingdom
- Post town: MANSFIELD
- Postcode district: NG20
- Dialling code: 01623
- Police: Nottinghamshire
- Fire: Nottinghamshire
- Ambulance: East Midlands
- UK Parliament: Mansfield
- Website: warsopparishcouncil.co.uk

Warsop Vale is a village in the Mansfield district of western Nottinghamshire, England. It is 18 miles (29 km) north of Nottingham, and 5 miles (8.0 km) north of Mansfield. It is in the civil parish of Warsop. Warsop Vale's heritage is primarily as a former mining village. It lies in an area known as the Dukeries, close to Clumber Park, Thoresby Park and hall, Rufford Park and the Earl of Portland estate of Welbeck, together all part of Sherwood Forest.

== Geography ==
=== Location ===
Warsop Vale is surrounded by the following local Nottinghamshire areas:

- Nether Langwith and Cuckney to the north
- Sookholme to the south
- Church Warsop and Market Warsop to the east
- Shirebrook in Derbyshire to the west

This area lies in the north west of the district and west of Nottinghamshire county, as well as being close to the Derbyshire boundary. The core of the hamlet is accessed from the B6031 Church Warsop-Shirebrook road. Surrounding the settlement is predominantly a farming area, interspersed by farms, occasional residential dwellings and some forested areas to the north.

=== Nearby woodlands and landscapes ===
The Hills and Holes Site of Special Scientific Interest (SSSI) is a geological feature spread out to the east, adjacent to the village. It is composed of former limestone quarries causing characteristic shallow dips to its landscape, the meadows of which flood regularly following heavy rainfall.

Sookholme Moor is a meadow, directly adjacent to the east of the village.

Further afield, The Lord Stubbins SSSI is 3/4 mile (1.2 km) to the north west.

=== Elevation ===
The wider area is low-lying, at a land elevation of 65–75 metres (213–246 ft), with a mining spoil tip peak directly north of the village of 100 metres (330 ft).

== Governance ==
The area is within the civil parish of Warsop, and is governed along with other local settlements at the first tier of public administration by Warsop Parish Council.

Mansfield District Council manage the middle level of public duties in the settlements.

Nottinghamshire County Council provides the highest strategic services locally.

The village is within the district and parish council ward of Warsop Carrs for local electoral purposes, the Warsop electoral division for county elections, and within the UK Parliament constituency of Mansfield.

== History ==
=== Etymology ===
The meaning of Warsop or (Wareshope as known in the Domesday Book in 1086). The name is said to derive from 'Waers Valley'. Waer being a minor leader of Anglican immigrants.

=== Conquest to the Victorian era ===
The wider Warsop parish was mainly part of a manor after the time of the Norman Conquest in 1066, as one of many held by the Norman Baron Roger de Busli, although part of it belonged to the King's soke of Mansfield, and nearby Sookholme was in ownership of an order of monks from Yorkshire by the 12th century. In 1232 Henry III made a grant to the manor advowson of the gift of Olive, daughter of Alan in her widowhood to Robert de Lexington. At his death the manor passed into the hands of his brother John, and onto his wife's nephew Robert de Sutton who became lord of the Manor in 1268.

In 1329, John Nunnes of London, acquired the manor of Warsop, and later William de Roos, passing at a later time to Sir John de Roos and his heirs the Earls of Rutland. In 1675, the manor was bought by the Knight family and in 1846 by will it passed to Sir Henry FitzHerbert, of Tissington, subsequent ownership descending through the FitzHerbert baronets.

William Wood, a local small landowner recorded in 1730s and 40s documentation as a yeoman, husbandman and lime-burner eventually having ownership of a cottage, tenement and croft, from 1733, until its 'feoffment' from Wood to Samuel Barlow in 1739. Locally influential, a number of surrounding local features were later named after him such as a farm, a lane and the railway bridge at Carter Lane. This William Wood farm was later occupied by a William Beeston, who farmed the Minster land (Minster Wood is to the north), and along with his son took part in a parish perambulation survey in 1816.

=== Limestone mining ===
The surrounding area for many centuries before had been quarried, particularly to the east in the Hills and Holes area, for limestone. The Hills and Holes were so named because of the undulating land left from mining. It was believed the two churches at Church Warsop and Sookholme had been erected using this locally obtained stone. Warsop limestone was also provided for restoration work at Southwell Minster after the English Civil War. Also there were local lime kilns used to smelt the loosely crushed stone to produce lime for masonry and flooring. Up until the end of the 19th century however, the immediate area of what would become Warsop Vale colliery village remained free of this activity as undeveloped agricultural land.

=== Colliery beginnings ===
In 1893, the Staveley Coal and Iron Company based in Staveley in Derbyshire decided to sink a coal mine some two miles south of Langwith to supplement their existing workings there. The reason for choosing a mine in this area was because of the success of the Langwith mine in the working of the prolific Top Hard Seam - a seam of high quality coal some 6 ft thick. Due to this, the company leased the land from the Fitzherberts estate for a 99-year period. Sinking of the shafts for Warsop Main Colliery was completed by 1895, to a depth of 558 yards (510 m) with mining in autumn the same year. A railway spur, south of Shirebrook station was taken from the Midland Railway's Nottingham to Worksop line. Where this intersected the Lancashire, Derbyshire and East Coast Railway line was known as Warsop Junction, with this in place in 1899, sited prior to entering the colliery grounds.

=== Early community years ===
Before the sinking of the shafts for Warsop Main Colliery took place, around 1893 the Staveley company built 2,000 feet (610 m) to the east using local limestone, a terrace of cottages known as the Rock Cottages in the Rhein O' Thorns area of the Hills and Holes quarry location north of Carter Lane, to house engineers who helped to develop the mine and sink the shafts. The mine, although in production by 1895, had no local housing for miners until 1900 when the Warsop Almanac reported that "Warsop Vale", a new village near Warsop Main Colliery, was taking shape with 160 houses built. These houses were built by a firm from the Staveley area called Moore's. The total cost to erect each house in the village at the time was £40. The original plans were to build some 500 homes but this did not come to fruition, with less than half being eventually completed.

The village houses were built in terraces, consisting of eight, ten or twelve houses. Multiple terraces were formed into multiple rows on three sides of a square with the colliery forming the fourth. Each house consisted of two rooms downstairs, plus a large pantry, and three bedrooms upstairs. In addition to the houses, the company built a school, and a public house named "The Vale Hotel". The mining company was also a very strong advocate of social activities among its workforce and in its heyday this small community of 212 houses offered a school which was opened in 1901, doctor's surgery, Co-operative Society shop, Anglican church and institute, Methodist chapel, allotments, cricket ground, football ground, bowling green, and tennis courts. During World War II a small number of housing was built in the corner between King Street and Carter Lane, known as the Co-operative villas.

=== Colliery growth, decline and closure ===
In 1935 Warsop Main Colliery was one of the most proficient mines in the country, employing some 2,500 men and boys and producing a weekly output of some 21,000 tons of saleable coal. In 1953 a detailed proposal was drawn up to modernise the mine both at surface and underground including tower mounted electrically powered winding systems at an overall cost of some then £3 million. This work, which was completed by 1960, was followed by other major projects during the following years to maintain the collieries' efficiency. Four other seams were exploited during the life of the mine, the High Hazel, the Main Bright, the Clowne and the Deep Soft, but these did not displace the Top Hard Seam for quality and quantity of output.

in 1980-1981 the pit's highest ever tonnage was 922,797 tonnes while employing 1,386 men, the one million tons milestone never being achieved. In 1985, following a cost cutting exercise, which resulted in the loss of 200 jobs, the then manager announced that the pit's future was secure. However, by 1989 it was reported that the colliery was losing £200,000 a week and had to close. The last shifts were worked around 25 August, with mine salvage afterwards. The first headgear was brought down by explosion on 23 October 1991 and the second demolished on 28 November 1991, marking the end of the mining era. Following the closure of the colliery, the local area declined with high unemployment, few facilities and boarded up houses where once there was a waiting list of people. A Warsop Vale Residents' Action Group was formed in 1994.

=== Village regeneration ===
The village was substantially redeveloped as part of regeneration plans during 2000–2003, becoming the first substantial development since the original village was constructed at the start of the 20th century. The terraced houses along the eastern side of the U-shaped layout originally aligned along Hewett Street and King Street were torn down. The scheme encroached onto some of the original open central village recreational area, although the former central cricket pitch was retained by creating a smaller central green. New housing was also built along the northern side of the village along East Street, where previously the area had been in use by the colliery works.

There are however, tentative signs towards a revival of the village's fortunes, with reports of house purchases being made by families which are not local or related to previous miners. The derelict site of the former Warsop Vale School site south of Carter Lane, was used to build ten three-bedroom properties in 2021. The former primary school, became vacant in 2009 and was demolished in 2014. This new development is called Rugby Park View and complements the existing detached houses to the east and the former village hall to the west. The plots consist of four detached and six semi-detached houses.

== Landmarks ==
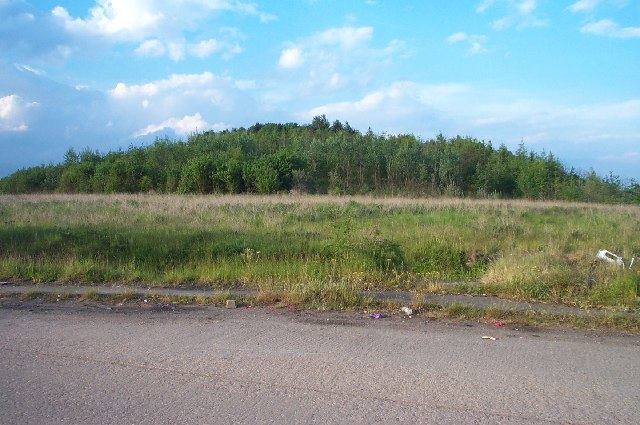
Warsop Main Colliery pit tip to the north of Warsop Vale

=== War memorial ===
A number of residents went to fight in World War I, of which 20 did not return. A war memorial was subsequently built in the churchyard but later moved to the green space within the centre of the village, with a plaque commemorating their efforts.

=== Hills and Holes SSSI ===
A former limestone quarry which has reverted to nature is known locally as the Hills and Holes (more informally as the Humps and Hollows), due to the shallow mining which took place. It's thought the churches in Warsop and Sookholme used stone mined from here. Large scale quarrying did not occur here, resulting in relatively preserved ecology. It's part of a lengthier geological limestone stretch along the whole length of Sookholme Brook and is a Site of Special Scientific Interest (SSSI) where the brook joins the River Meden. It also encompasses Sookholme Moor at its southern extremity. This area contains notable wildlife and holds some of the finest remaining limestone flora in Nottinghamshire.

== Transport ==
The High Marnham test track run by Network Rail passes to the south of the village. This reuses the former Lancashire, Derbyshire and East Coast, and later LNER railway line that ran between Chesterfield, Shirebrook and onwards to Lincoln. The nearest railway station is to the west of Sookholme, at Shirebrook.

== Sport and leisure ==
=== Cycling and paths ===
- NCN National Route 648 is a short distance designated cycle way which runs to the north of Warsop Vale, reusing the colliery railway track bed, before joining Carter Lane and running east towards Church Warsop.
- The Dukeries Trail parallels route 648 but is a 32 mi (51 kilometres) medium distance path and tourist cycling route through the Nottinghamshire ducal estates, into Lincolnshire.

== Notable people ==
- Frederick Newton (1890-1924), miner and cricket player
- Hugo Street, miner and trade union official
- Cyril Ellis (1904–73), athlete
- Walter Millership (1910–78), football player
- Harry Everett (1920–98), football player
- Harold Everett (1922-2000), football player
