= St Augustine's Church, Sookholme =

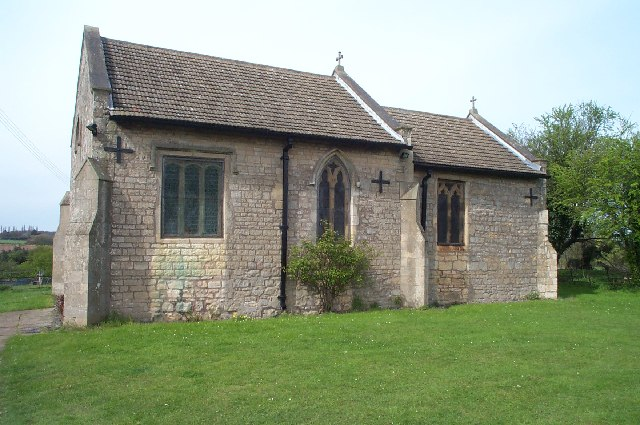
- St Augustine's Church, Sookholme
- St Augustine's Church, Sookholme
- 53°11′34.90″N 1°11′8.66″W
- OS grid reference: SK 54834 66906
- Location: Sookholme
- Country: England
- Denomination: Church of England

History
- Dedication: St Augustine

Architecture
- Heritage designation: Grade I listed

Administration
- Diocese: Diocese of Southwell and Nottingham
- Archdeaconry: Newark
- Deanery: Mansfield
- Parish: Warsop

St Augustine's Church, Sookholme is a Grade I listed parish church in the Church of England in Sookholme near Warsop.

== History ==
The church was built in the 12th century. It was restored in the 20th century.

== See also ==
- Grade I listed buildings in Nottinghamshire
- Listed buildings in Warsop
