= Neil French (cricketer) =

English cricketer (1964–2025)

Personal information
- Full name: Neil French
- Born: 18 July 1964; Warsop, Nottinghamshire, England
- Died: 11 January 2025 (aged 60)
- Batting: Right-handed
- Bowling: Right-arm medium
- Relatives: Bruce French (brother); Jake Ball (nephew)

Domestic team information
- Years: Team
- 1988–1995: Lincolnshire

Career statistics
Competition	List A
Matches	3
Runs scored	26
Batting average	8.66
100s/50s	0/0
Top score	18
Balls bowled	210
Wickets	2
Bowling average	80.50
5 wickets in innings	0
10 wickets in match	0
Best bowling	1/56
Catches/stumpings	1/–
- Source: CricketArchive, 18 January 2025

Neil French (18 July 1964 – 11 January 2025) was an English cricketer. French was a right-handed batsman who bowled right-arm medium pace.

== Career ==
French was born in Warsop, Nottinghamshire. He made his debut for Lincolnshire in the 1988 MCCA Knockout Trophy against Cumberland. French played Minor counties cricket for Lincolnshire from 1988 to 1995, which included 31 Minor Counties Championship matches and 11 MCCA Knockout Trophy matches. He made his List A debut against Lancashire in the 1988 NatWest Trophy. He played two further List A matches for Lincolnshire, against Gloucestershire in the 1990 NatWest Trophy and Glamorgan in the 1994 NatWest Trophy. In his three matches, he scored 26 runs at an average of 8.66, with a high score of 18. With the ball, he took two wickets at an expensive bowling average of 80.50, with best figures of 1/56.

== Personal life and death ==
French's brother, Bruce, played Test cricket for England. French died on 11 January 2025, at the age of 60.
