= Warsop Town Hall =

Municipal building in Warsop, Nottinghamshire, England

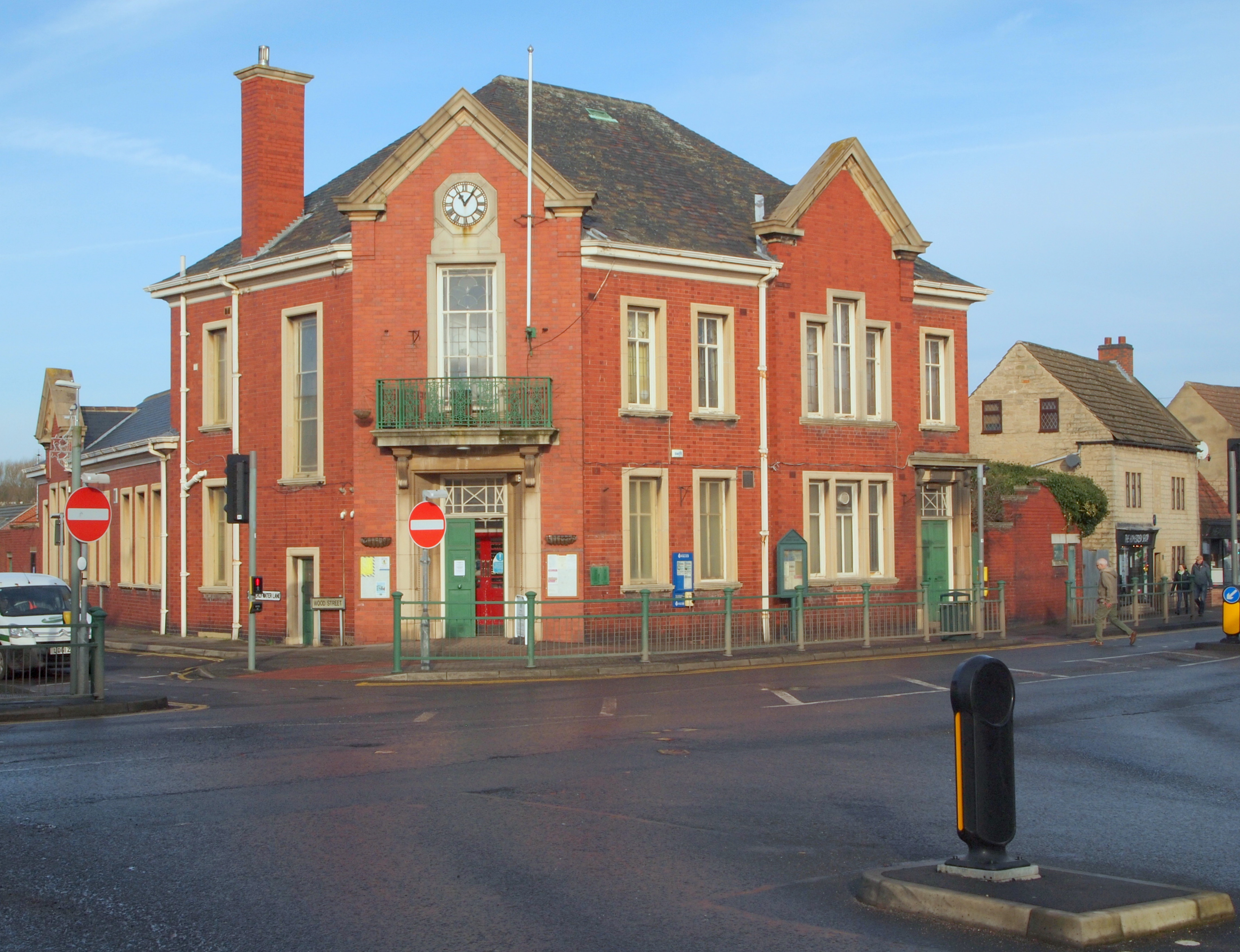
- Warsop Town Hall

- Shown in Nottinghamshire
- 53.2063°N 1.1531°W
- Location: Church Street, Warsop

History
- Built: 1933

Site notes
- Architectural style: Neoclassical style

Warsop Town Hall is a municipal building in Church Street in Warsop, Nottinghamshire, England. The building is home to Warsop Parish Council, and was formerly the offices of Warsop Urban District Council and the local offices of Nottinghamshire County Council.

Following financial difficulties at Parish level, from 2024 the hall became a community hub administered by a local church.

== History ==
Following significant population growth, largely associated with mineral quarrying, the area became an urban district in 1894. In the early years, the clerk to the council, John Harrop White, was based in offices in Bank Chambers in Mansfield. Shortly after the First World War, the council established its own offices: it was in this building that a post mortem was carried out on the body of Samuel Fell Wilson, a Warsop grocer, wine merchant, and publisher of the Warsop and District Almanack, after he had been shot in the head and chest as he sat in his car outside Warsop Windmill on 23 September 1930. In the early 1930s the council decided to commission more substantial offices: the site selected on Church Street had previously been occupied by a row of residential properties.

The new building was designed in the neoclassical style, built in red brick with stone dressings at a cost of £8,000 and was officially opened on 13 July 1933. The design involved a symmetrical main frontage at the corner of Wood Street and Church Street. It featured a deeply recessed doorway flanked by pilasters and brackets supporting a wrought iron balcony; there was a French door on the first floor and the whole structure was surmounted by an open pediment with a clock in a hexagonal-shaped frame in the tympanum. The Wood Street elevation extended back ten bays with a pedimented section, which slightly projected forward, spanning the eighth and ninth bays, while the Church Street elevation extended back four bays with a pedimented section, which slightly projected forward, in the third bay. Internally, the principal rooms were a council chamber, a library and a maternity and child welfare centre. The council chamber was fitted out with fine wooden panelling.

The building continued to serve as the headquarters of the urban district council for much of the 20th century, but ceased to be a local seat of government when the new Mansfield District Council was formed in 1974. Mansfield District Council subsequently rented the building out to Nottinghamshire County Council until 2011, when it agreed to grant possession to Warsop Parish Council, which had prepared a business plan, with a 99-year lease at a nominal sum. The contract involved a token price of one pound and a condition restricted future use to civic and community purposes only.

In September 2011, Nottinghamshire Police relocated their local neighbourhood police officers into premises in the town hall and around the same time Citizens Advice also moved their staff into the building; however, following funding reductions, the Citizens Advice office closed in July 2014. Some rooms were also rented out to local businesses.

A building survey, carried out in July 2019, indicated that the building needed a major programme of refurbishment works costing £200,000.

After a 2021 local public consultation indicated alternative owners would be preferable, 'Save Warsop's Independent Town Hall Community' (SWITCH) was formed which forged links with Lifespring Church and community hub, a registered charity based in nearby Ollerton, which has an ethos of providing accessible spiritual and community services at local level.
