= Sookholme =

Village in Nottinghamshire, England

Coordinates: 53.196°N 1.180°W

- Village
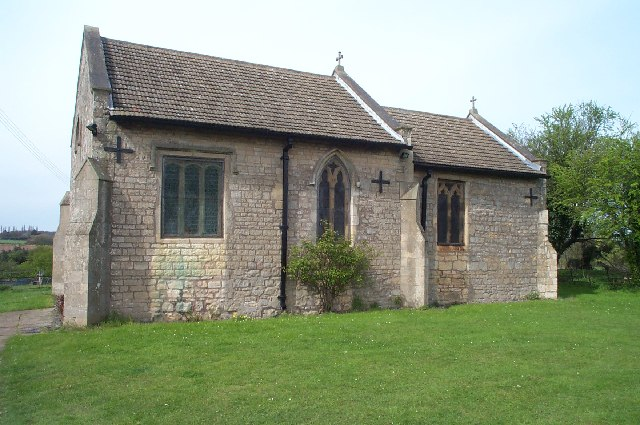
- St Augustine's Church, Sookholme

- Location within Nottinghamshire
- Interactive map of Sookholme
- OS grid reference: SK 54832 66931
- Civil parish: Warsop
- District: Mansfield
- Shire county: Nottinghamshire
- Region: East Midlands
- Country: England
- Sovereign state: United Kingdom
- Post town: MANSFIELD
- Postcode district: NG19
- Dialling code: 01623
- Police: Nottinghamshire
- Fire: Nottinghamshire
- Ambulance: East Midlands
- UK Parliament: Mansfield
- Website: warsopparishcouncil.co.uk

Sookholme is a village and former civil parish, now in the parish of Warsop in the Mansfield district of western Nottinghamshire, England. It is 120 miles (190 km) north west of London, 16 3/4 miles (27.0 km) north of the county town and city of Nottingham, and 3 1/2 miles (5.6 km) north of the town of Mansfield.

Sookholme retains an agricultural character, having been largely unaffected by the Industrial Revolution, which had a transformative impact on the settlement pattern and built form of numerous other settlements situated within the North Midlands coalfields. Whilst relatively close to the built up areas of Mansfield and Shirebrook, Sookholme is remote and rural. In 1931 the parish had a population of 210.

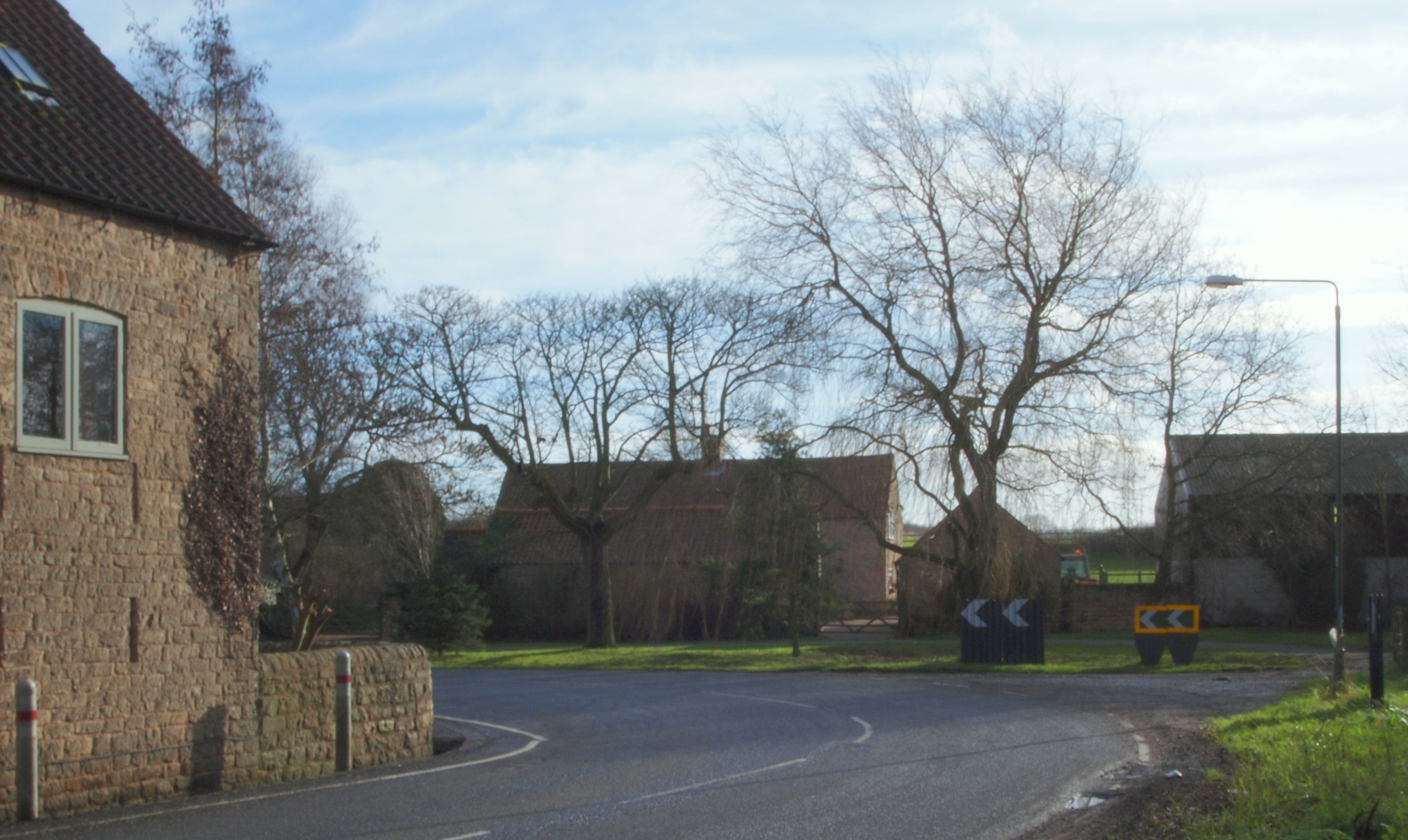
Sookholme

== Geography ==
Sookholme is surrounded by the following local Nottinghamshire areas:

- Warsop Vale to the north
- Mansfield Woodhouse to the south
- Spion Kop and Market Warsop to the east
- Shirebrook in Derbyshire to the west.

This area lies in the north west of the district and west of Nottinghamshire county, as well as being directly adjacent to the Derbyshire boundary. The core of the hamlet is accessed from the B6407 Mansfield-Shirebrook road. Surrounding the settlement is predominantly a farming area, interspersed by farms, occasional residential dwellings and some forested areas to the west, separating Sookholme from Shirebrook. Sookholme stands on the north bank of the River Meden, while there is a spring south west of the area which feeds a basin called Sookholme Bath, and which then drains through the heart of the village via Sookholme Brook into the Meden.

The wider area is low-lying, at a land elevation of 65–85 metres (213–279 ft), with higher peaks in Shirebrook and Spring Woods west of the village of 105–110 metres (344–361 ft).

== Governance ==
The area is within Warsop parish, and is governed along with other local settlements at the first tier of public administration by Warsop Parish Council.

Mansfield District Council manage the middle level of public duties in the settlements.

Nottinghamshire County Council provides the highest strategic services locally.

Sookholme was formerly a township in Warsop parish, from 1866 Sookholme was a civil parish in its own right until it was abolished on 1 April 1935 and merged with Warsop.

== History ==
=== Toponymy ===
Sookholme was not recorded in the Domesday Book of 1086. It first appeared in 1189 within public records as Sulcholm, and centuries later, Sokeholme. It lies in the Meden river valley, the Old English translation for this early spelling form is 'marshy land in the valley,'

An alternative interpretation is the use of the Anglo-Saxon words soc or soke, a privilege or jurisdiction, and holme, an island, or the rich land by a stream. So that Sokeholme originally meant the rich land by a stream.

=== Roman period ===
Numerous examples of Roman tile fragments have been found on several occasions in the field to the south of the pond known locally as the Sookholme Bath. These were first found in the 1930s and excavations throughout later decades were done but no kiln structures were found. Due to the overgrown surrounding areas of the pond and the waters, little follow up was done. The archives of Major Hayman Rooke contains sketches which displays Roman baths observed beneath the existing pond which possibly is what the tiles were used to create, and take advantage of the reputed healing waters of the nearby spring. The excavation report, drawings and tile samples are held in the Mansfield Museum's archaeology repository.

=== Priory ===
Before the Reformation the manor belonged to the Priory of St. Oswald, at Nostell, in Yorkshire, and was likely served by a branch establishment of the priory in Sookholme. While no record of that remains, there is a field near Longster Lane leading to Shirebrook containing a number of yew trees planted in the form of a square—the kind that would be planted near an Anglican place of religion in the past. In the reign of Edward III during the 14th century, the prior of St. Oswald claimed all sorts of privileges in the manor of Sookholme, but it could not be proven that he or his predecessors ever had those specific rights.

=== Sookholme Hall ===
Also referred to as Sokeholme Hall, this was previously on the site of Eyre's farm-house, also known as present-day Hall Farm. At the beginning of the 19th century, part of the old hall still existed, and one of the upper rooms went by the name of " Lukin's Garret," and was said to be haunted by the ghost of a certain member of the Lukin family, who, according to tradition, committed suicide there. A brass tablet to the memory of Henry Lukin, of Sookholme Hall, is held in Warsop church, which states he was born at Great Baddow, Essex, in 1586, and died at Sookholme in 1630. The Foster family preceded Lukin at the Hall and so infers the building was in place over some hundreds of years until around the year 1745, when Hall Farm was constructed at the location.

=== Nettleworth Manor ===
Located to the south of Sookholme, Nettleworth Hall was the centrepiece of the manor and was built in 1566 by William Wylde. The hall was rebuilt following a fire in 1785. It was sold by the Wylde family to Sir Henry Gally Knight, and it later passed to Sir Henry Fitzherbert, of the FitzHerbert baronets. When Rev. Richard Fitzherbert inherited the baroncy in 1896 he resigned as rector of Warsop and moved from the rectory to Nettleworth Manor. The nearby Nettleworth farm was also part of the holdings. The hall by 1939-40 was in the ownership of the Neville family, who then dismantled it to prevent the military taking possession of it for war purposes. The service wing was left standing on site which has since been converted into residential quarters.

=== Post Reformation ===
After the English Reformation, Sookholme was granted to the Leek family, and from them it descended to the Cavendishes, one of whom was the Duke of Newcastle. The manor later passed to the Dukes of Portland, and, through them, by an exchange of land, to Henry Gally Knight, and on to the FitzHerbert family as part of their wider Warsop holdings. In the 1700s there was a public house and a mill recorded in the area. Sookholme was a civil parish from 1866 until 1935, when it was merged into Warsop parish. The barn and adjoining farm buildings at Hall Farm were converted into a number of homes in the early 2010s.

== Landmarks ==
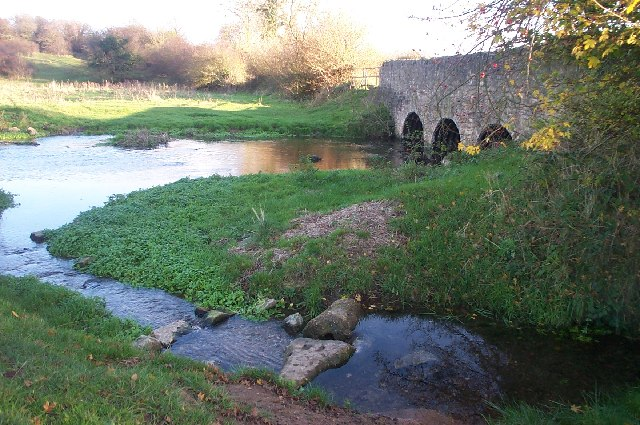
Sookholme Lane over Hammerwater Bridge by the River Meden

=== Sookholme Bath ===
Sookholme Bath is the site of a natural spring forming the source of Sookholme Brook. There is evidence that the spring was used as an ancient healing spa, as nearby fragments of Roman bricks and tiles have been found, suggesting it was the site of a possible Roman tile kiln.

=== Sookholme Brook SSSI ===
A former limestone quarry stretches the whole length of Sookholme Brook and is a Site of Special Scientific Interest together with the Hills and Holes area where the brook joins the River Meden. It also encompasses Sookholme Moor at its northern extremity. This area contains notable wildlife and holds some of the finest remaining limestone flora in Nottinghamshire.

=== Shirebrook Wood ===
This is alternatively known as Three Lakes Country Park, and is managed by Forestry England. Despite the name, the wood has a sizable portion within Nottinghamshire, adjacent to Sookholme and visitors access is primarily by means of Longster Lane. The woods contain a mixture of mature broadleaf woodland, newly planted trees, large open meadows and a scenic wetland valley. It also provides home to a variety of wildlife including songbirds, small mammals and butterflies. The Millennium hedge was planted to celebrate the millennium and runs along the border between Nottinghamshire and Derbyshire. Spring Wood, a subsection of the wider park, is to the south of Bath Lane, but is wholly within Derbyshire.

=== Listed buildings ===
Five buildings of local architectural interest are registered as listed, mainly aligned along the historic portion of the village by Sookholme Lane.

The buildings are mainly Grade II, including:

- Hall Farmhouse
- Hall Farmhouse barn and auxiliary buildings
- Mill Farmhouse
- Nettleworth Farmhouse, stable block and wall, in Nettleworth Manor
- St Augustine's Church (Grade I)

== Religious sites ==
=== St Augustine's Church ===
The small chapel, consisting of nave and chancel, was built in the reign of Henry II in the 12th century. Its plan is almost two squares, with the larger square for the nave and the smaller the chancel, with door at the west end. This front was taken down and rebuilt further east, removing about a third of its old length from the nave. If this third had remained, Sookholme would be one of those small chapels with square-ended sanctuaries, commonly built in Saxon and Norman times. There is no tower or spire.

== Sport ==
The John Fretwell Sporting Complex lies along the B6407 road between Sookholme and Mansfield. Primarily for cricket, other facilities include football and bowls.

== Transport ==
The Robin Hood Line passes between Sookholme and Shirebrook. The High Marnham test track run by Network Rail passes to the north of the village. It reuses the former LNER railway line that ran between Chesterfield, Shirebrook and onwards to Lincoln. The nearest public accessible stop is to the west of Sookholme at Shirebrook railway station.
