= Warsop =

Parish in North Nottinghamshire

Coordinates: 53.20°N 1.15°W

- Civil parish
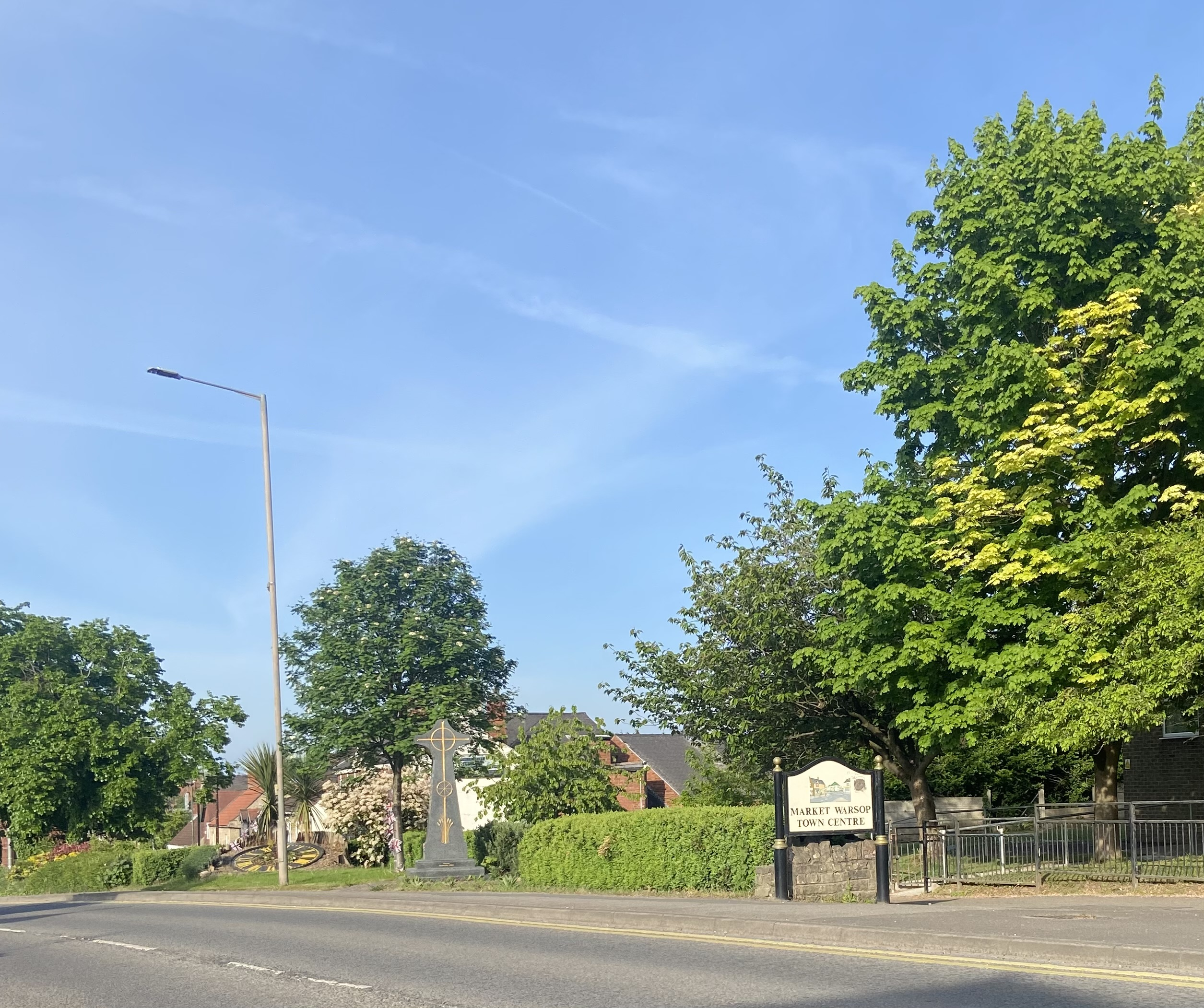
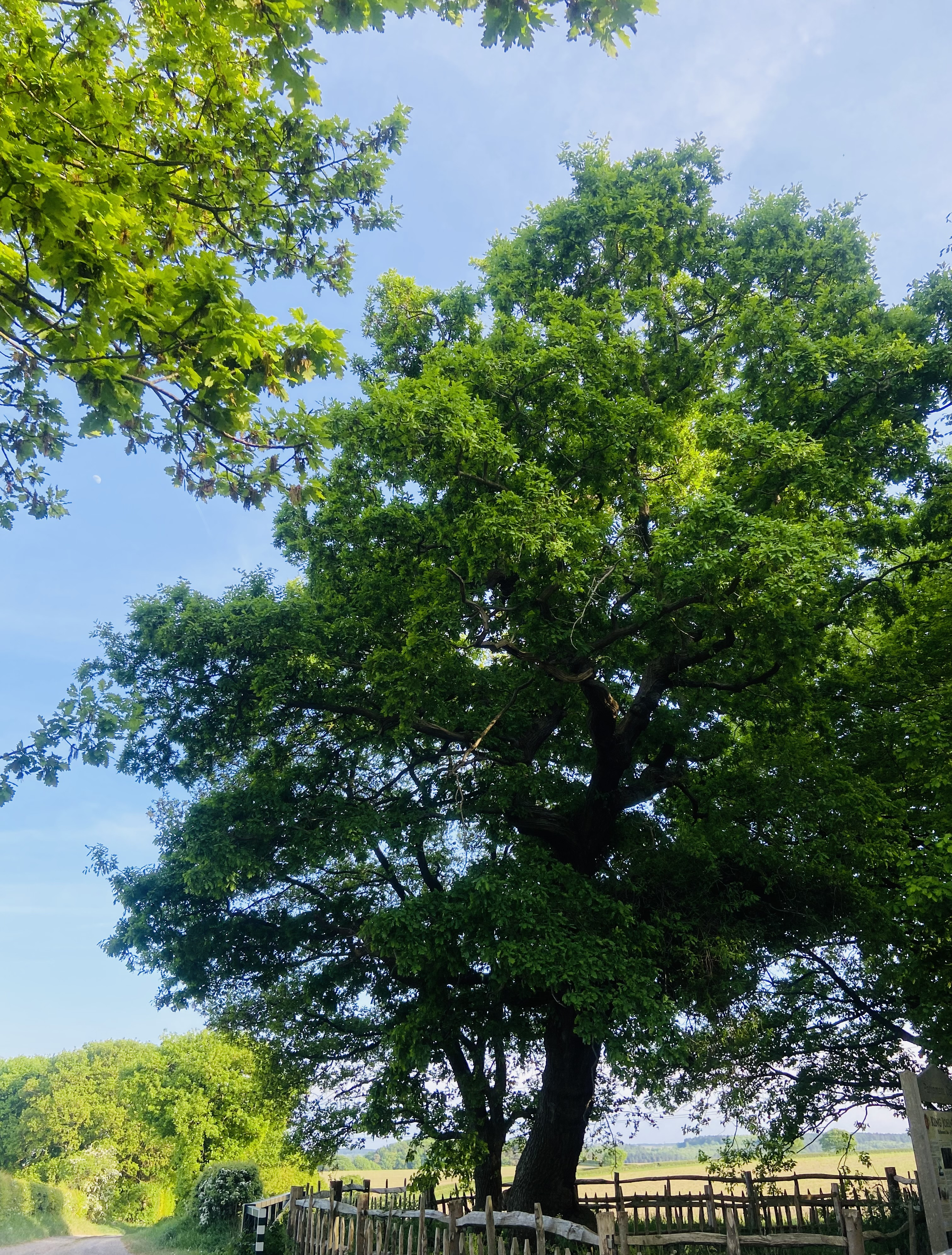
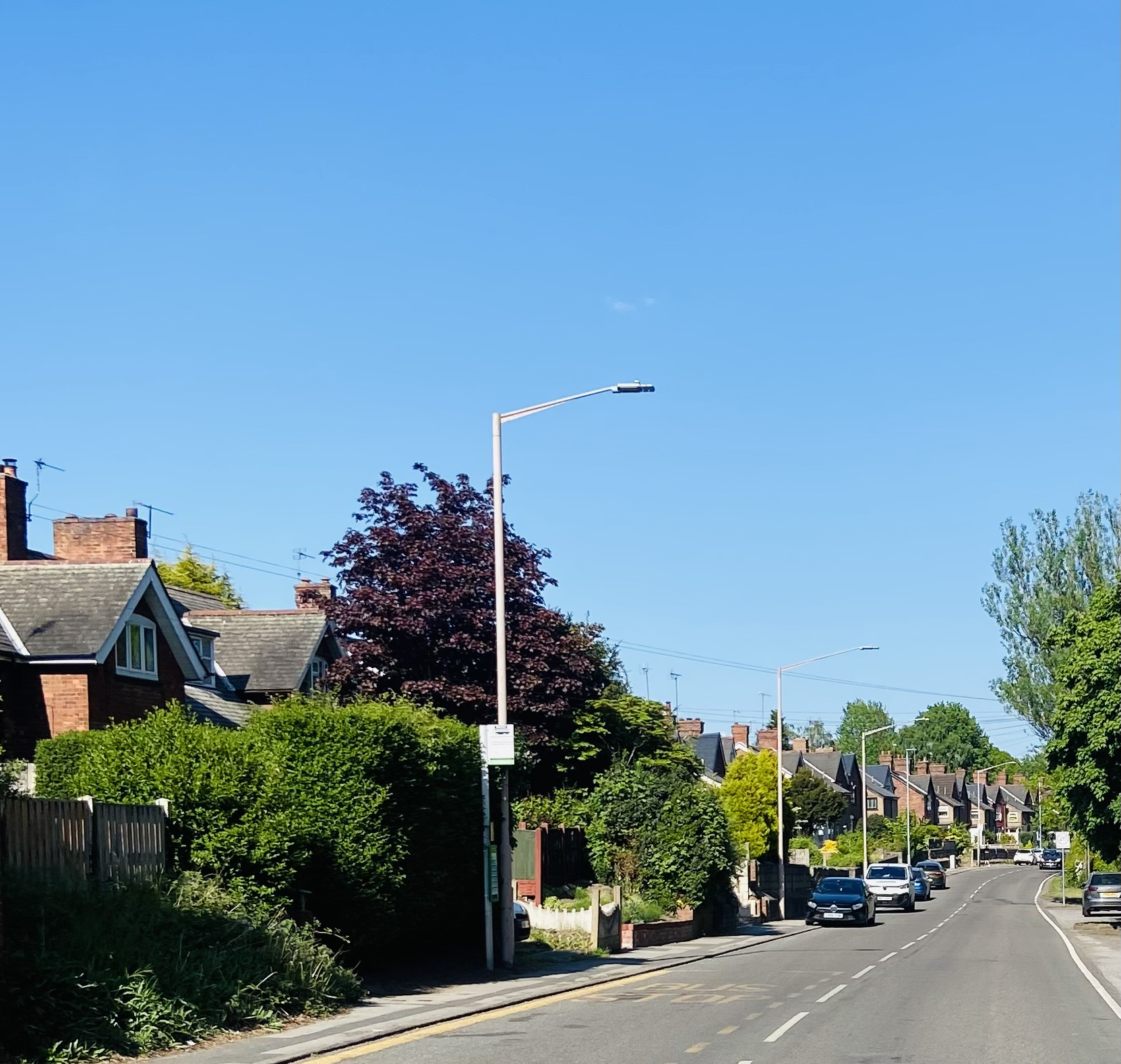
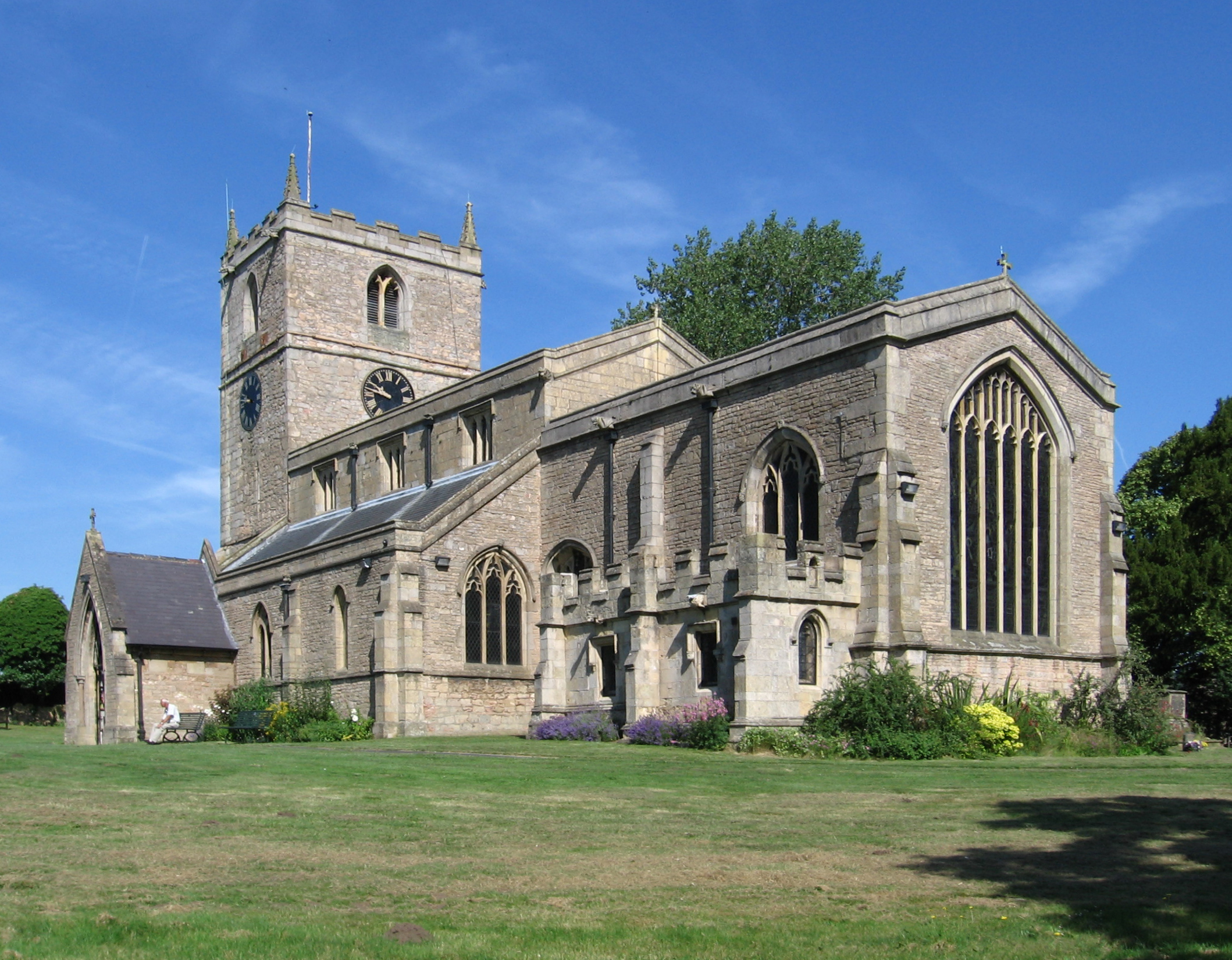
- Market Warsop Parliament Oak Meden Vale Church Warsop

- Location within Nottinghamshire
- Interactive map of Warsop
- Area: 11.12 sq mi (28.8 km^{2})
- Population: 12,644 (2021)
  - Density: 1,137/sq mi (439/km^{2})
- OS grid reference: SK 568685
  - London: 125 mi (201 km) SE
- District: Mansfield
- Shire county: Nottinghamshire
- Region: East Midlands
- Country: England
- Sovereign state: United Kingdom
- Settlements: Market Warsop, Church Warsop, Sookholme, Nettleworth Manor, Gleadthorpe Grange, Meden Vale, Warsop Vale, Spion Kop
- Post town: MANSFIELD
- Postcode district: NG20
- Dialling code: 01623
- Police: Nottinghamshire
- Fire: Nottinghamshire
- Ambulance: East Midlands
- UK Parliament: Mansfield
- Website: warsopparishcouncil.co.uk

Warsop is a civil parish in Mansfield District, Nottinghamshire, England, on the outskirts of the remnants of Sherwood Forest. At the 2021 census the population was 12,644 residents, including the settlements of Market Warsop, Church Warsop, Warsop Vale, Meden Vale, Sookholme and Spion Kop.

== History ==
Church Warsop appeared in the Domesday Book of 1086 as a settlement named Wareshope and was recorded as having a church which was St Peter and St Paul. This formed part of the hundred of Bassetlaw. The area was divided amongst the Saxon Lords Godric, Leviet, and Ulchel. Gleadthorpe Grange was also recorded in Domesday. From the Norman conquest period onwards, Warsop was held by the Norman Baron Roger de Busli, and partially held by the King's Soke of Mansfield. Sookholme and its medieval church St Augustine's along with Nettleworth Manor were first recorded later in public records during the 12th century.

=== Landmarks ===
King John and Edward I are reputed to have had impromptu parliaments at the Parliament Oak Tree in the far east of the parish during the 13th century.

Henry III granted the advowson of the manor to Robert de Lexington in 1232, and after his death it passed to his brother John and further to his wife’s nephew Robert de Sutton, becoming lord of the manor in 1268. John Nunnes of London, obtained the manor in 1329 and he established a market in 1330. Two annual fairs were eventually granted along with a Saturday market located south of the River Meden. By this time, this area was known as Warsop Fair Town, and later Market Warsop, the original settlement north of the Meden becoming Church Warsop. The wider manor passed through to the de Roos family and their heirs the Earls of Rutland. The Knight family bought the manor In 1675, and in 1846 it was inherited by Sir Henry FitzHerbert of Tissington, the family continue hold much of the area into the present day.

Warsop watermill was built in 1767.

Warsop windmill, first called Forest Mill but also later known as Bradmer Mill, was a stone-built tower erected in 1825. It was 28 feet high with three storeys, a fourth storey being added later in brick. The mill had four sails, two of which were blown down by a gale in 1910, after which the mill was worked for a short time on the two remaining sails. By the 1920s the mill had lost all its sails and its cap. The tower is a Grade II listed building, standing to the southeast of Warsop close to the A6075.

In 1930, Samuel Fell Wilson, a Warsop grocer, wine merchant, and publisher of the Warsop and District Almanack, was shot in the head and chest as he sat in his car outside the mill. A street bears his name.

Warsop Town Hall was completed in 1933.

In 2010, a new Market Cross was commissioned and erected at Downy Hill, on the southern edge of the town centre at the side of the A60 road. Historically, a cross was known to have existed in the 1500s, and a replacement occurred in 1787. The foundations were excavated in 1911.

=== Coal mining ===
Two collieries were built within the parish to take advantage of lucrative coal seams within Nottinghamshire, Warsop Main to the north west in 1893 and Welbeck (the grounds of which overlapped mostly into the adjacent and present-day Norton, Cuckney, Holbeck and Welbeck civil parish) in the north east from 1912. Communities were established alongside them to house miners and their families, Warsop Vale and Meden Vale (originally Welbeck Colliery Village) respectively, while Spion Kop was built south west of Market Warsop as an overspill settlement. Warsop Main closed in 1989 and Welbeck in 2010.

== Governance ==
The parish was an urban district in Nottinghamshire until 1974, when it joined with Mansfield Borough and Woodhouse Urban District Council to form Mansfield District Council. Warsop retains a council, as a successor parish, including the localities of Market Warsop, Church Warsop, Meden Vale, Warsop Vale and Spion Kop. The council is based at Warsop Town Hall.

After re-alignment of local wards within Mansfield District Council before the 2011 local elections to achieve a standard format of one councillor-per-ward, Warsop has four designated wards named as Warsop Carrs, Netherfield, Market Warsop and Meden.

Warsop is a part of the Mansfield Parliamentary Constituency since 2010, whose MP from 2017 to May 2024 was Ben Bradley, followed by Steve Yemm.

== Geography and demography ==
Warsop is surrounded by Mansfield Woodhouse and Mansfield to the south, Shirebrook and Langwith in Derbyshire to the west, Nether Langwith, Cuckney and Norton to the north, Perlethorpe cum Budby, Edwinshowe and Kings Clipstone parishes to the east.

The parish contains five historic settlements and three former mining villages:

- Market Warsop, the largest area at the centre, south of the River Meden
- Church Warsop, north of the Meden
- Sookholme, to the west of the parish
- Nettleworth Manor, in the south west
- Gleadthorpe Grange to the far north east.

Nearby settlements built to support local mining activities in the 20th century were:

- Meden Vale, in the north east
- Warsop Vale to the north west
- Spion Kop in the south of the parish sited along a short stretch of the A60 road

At the 2001 census the overall parish had a population of 12,365, reducing to 11,999 at the 2011 census, and increasing to 12,644 in 2021.

== Education ==
Market Warsop is home to Meden School on Burns Lane, part of a local group named Torch Academy Gateway Trust. Former pupils include television hosts Pollyanna Woodward and Simon Mapletoft, Mansfield 103.2 presenter Jason Harrison, Breakfast Show host Joe Sentance on Rother FM/Dearne FM, ex-Everton footballer Neil Pointon, former England wicketkeeper Bruce French and his nephew, and current England and Nottinghamshire fast bowler Jake Ball.

== Transport ==
Warsop railway station operated between 1897 and 1955. There is some ambition for eventual reopening of the line currently freight only between Shirebrook and Warsop.

Stagecoach bus 12 runs twice an hour between Shirebrook, Warsop and Mansfield. Stagecoach bus 11 also runs twice an hour between Meden Vale, Warsop and Mansfield, giving Warsop a bus service into Mansfield every 15 minutes. Another bus, numbered 209, runs between Edwinstowe and Worksop via Warsop and Cuckney every two hours.

== Media ==
Television signals are received from either the Emley Moor or Belmont TV transmitters. Local radio station are provided by BBC Radio Nottingham, Capital East Midlands, and Mansfield 103.2, a community based station which broadcast from Mansfield. The town is served by the local newspaper, Mansfield and Ashfield Chad.

== In the news ==
In July 2012, local woman Charlotte Collinge was found guilty of the murder of her husband Clifford Collinge and was sentenced to 23 years. Her two male accomplices were both sentenced to 18 years.

Following a re-trial in July 2015, Collinge was found not guilty, but the sentences on both accomplices were re-imposed.

== Local events ==
The parish holds an annual carnival on The Carrs playing fields, just off the main A60 road: it is traditionally scheduled on the first or second Sunday in July.

== Heritage assets ==
The parish contains 28 listed buildings that are recorded in the National Heritage List for England. Of these, two medieval churches at Church Warsop and Sookholme are listed at Grade I, the highest of the three grades, the Parish Centre building at Church Warsop is at Grade II*, the middle grade, and the others are at Grade II, which include architectural items ranging from a war memorial, farmhouses and related structures, bridges and a windmill.
