= Spion Kop, Nottinghamshire =

Housing area near Warsop, Nottinghamshire

Coordinates: 53.1923°N 1.1644°W

Spion Kop
- Village
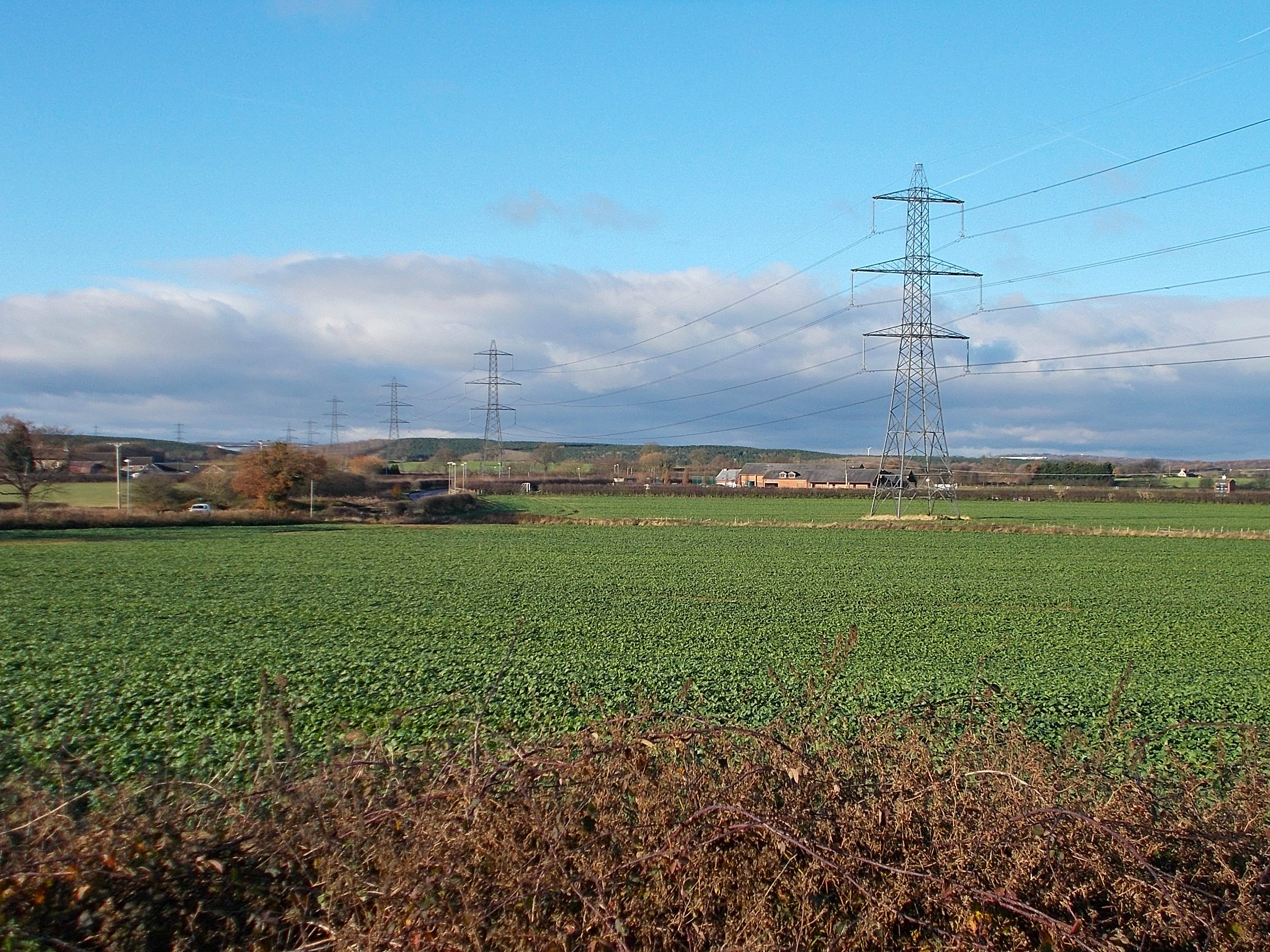
- Mansfield Road

- Location within Nottinghamshire
- OS grid reference: SK555665
- District: Mansfield
- Shire county: Nottinghamshire
- Region: East Midlands
- Country: England
- Sovereign state: United Kingdom
- Post town: Mansfield
- Postcode district: NG20
- Police: Nottinghamshire
- Fire: Nottinghamshire
- Ambulance: East Midlands
- UK Parliament: Mansfield
- Website: warsopparishcouncil.co.uk

Spion Kop is a small village in the Mansfield District in the civil parish of Warsop, in Nottinghamshire. It stretches along both sides of the main A60 road for a few hundred metres. Spion Kop lies to the south of Market Warsop.

== History ==
It is a settlement built and named after the Battle of Spion Kop which took place during the Second Boer War in Natal, South Africa, in January 1900. A major military figure in the conflict was John Talbot Coke, grandson of D'Ewes Coke, born at Mansfield Woodhouse, a well-known Nottinghamshire industrialist and clergyman. At Mansfield Woodhouse a Coke Street was renamed Newhaven Avenue.

A modern, large-scale mixed-residential development was built on the extensive site of the old Wood Brothers timber business on Mansfield Road following a successful planning application to Mansfield District Council in 2011.
