= Steve Ward (boxer) =

British boxer

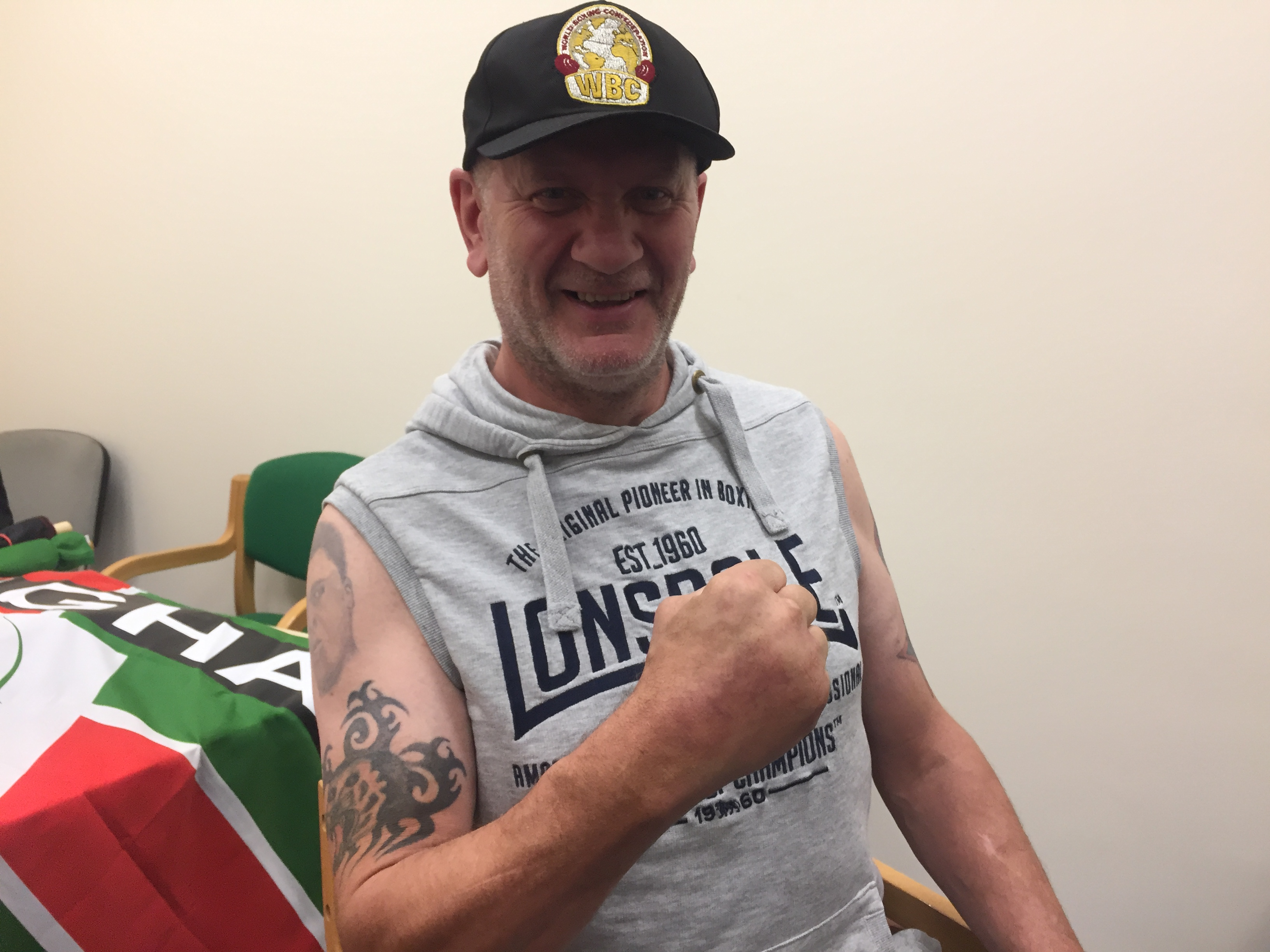

Personal information
- Nationality: United Kingdom
- Born: Steve Ward; 8 December 1956 (age 69) Nottingham, United Kingdom
- Weight: Cruiserweight

Boxing career
- Stance: Orthodox

Boxing record
- Wins: 15
- Win by KO: 1
- Losses: 41

Stephen Ward (born 12 August 1956) is an English former professional boxer, notable for having held the accolade of being the oldest professional boxer in the world. He was first confirmed as such in 2011 at age 54. Born in Nottingham and now living in nearby Mansfield, in 2012 Ward was given a civic reception by the mayor of Nottingham at Nottingham Council House to recognise his achievements.

== Fighting career ==
Ward boxed as an amateur from 1967–1977. His original professional boxing career lasted from 1977 to 1987. After an industrial accident injured his foot leading to complex regional pain syndrome, he was treated by a Hong Kong surgeon recommended by a fellow martial artist when training at a gym. He then resumed boxing training including running for up to 10 mi (16 km) and made a comeback in 2010 against Gregg Scott-Briggs to win the Midlands Area Cruiserweight belt. He then successfully defended the title against Pete McJob in March 2011, and again with a unanimous points decision against Keifer Bentley in June 2011.

Ward received the 2012 Sportsperson of the Year accolade at Mansfield's Sports Recognition Awards, a local yearly ceremony, in recognition of his world record and EBF title at Cruiserweight.

Ward suffered a hand injury on top of the work accident affecting one leg, and became a boxing coach to youngsters.

He lost the distinction of world's oldest professional in 2015, when an older fighter, American Mike Palmer, competed in a professional bout, but regained it later that year when he fought professionally at 59, and was described as the oldest active boxer, after losing a fight in the third round against younger Jody Meikle at Chesterfield, attended by a Guinness World Records adjudicator on 12 December.

He retired in 2017 after losing the WBC veteran heavyweight championship title to Andreas Sidon.

In 2019, The Champ of Champs, a documentary film was produced featuring Ward's long involvement in boxing and fight-back against serious injury.

In late 2020, Ward confirmed plans to fight again in 2021 against Jimmy Lloyd, in an attempt to gain a new world record, in a new sector called Gold Division, and claim a fourth Guinness World Record as the world's oldest boxer. In January 2021, the fight, a veteran’s version of the world championship, was announced for May, before Ward's 65th birthday.
