= Meden Vale =

Village in Nottinghamshire, England

Coordinates: 53.222°N 1.126°W

- Village
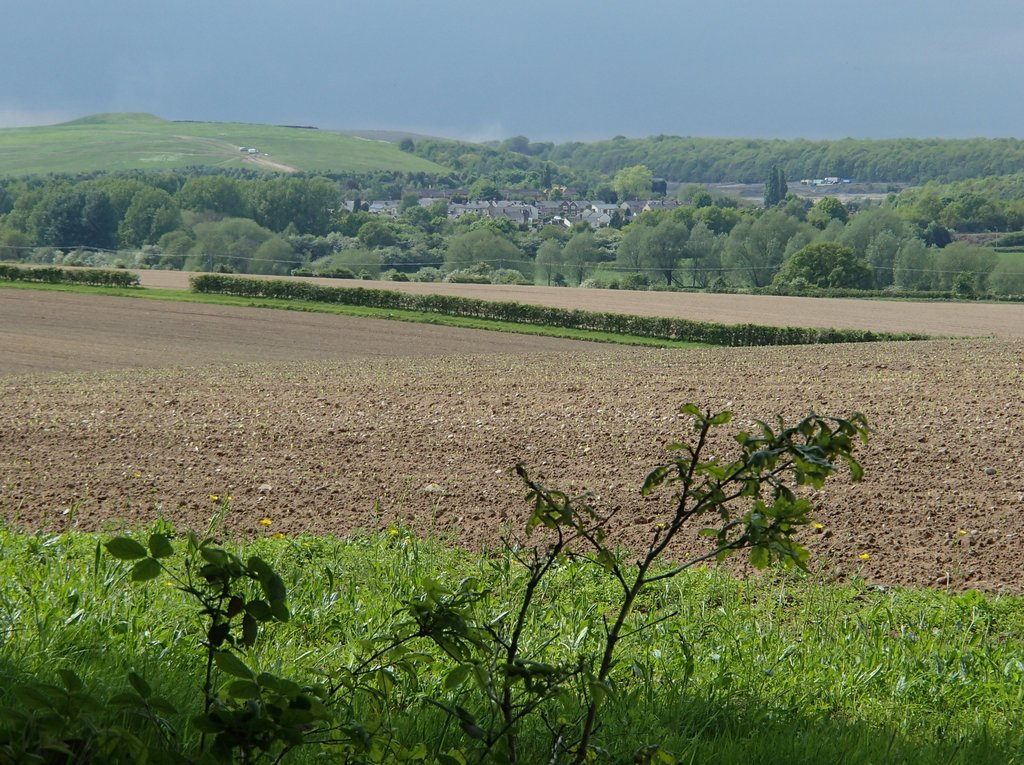
- Meden Vale

- Location within Nottinghamshire
- OS grid reference: SK4459
- District: Mansfield District
- Shire county: Nottinghamshire
- Region: East Midlands
- Country: England
- Sovereign state: United Kingdom
- Post town: MANSFIELD
- Postcode district: NG20
- Police: Nottinghamshire
- Fire: Nottinghamshire
- Ambulance: East Midlands
- UK Parliament: Mansfield
- Website: warsopparishcouncil.co.uk

Meden Vale is a small village near to Church Warsop. The village is part of the parish of Warsop. It is also situated close to the small town of Market Warsop, in north Nottinghamshire, England, off the main A60 Mansfield to Worksop road, and lies within Mansfield District Council administrative area.

== History ==
Meden Vale was originally known as Welbeck Colliery Village prior to renaming in the late 1960s. The village was built in the 1920s specifically to house miners who worked at Welbeck Colliery.

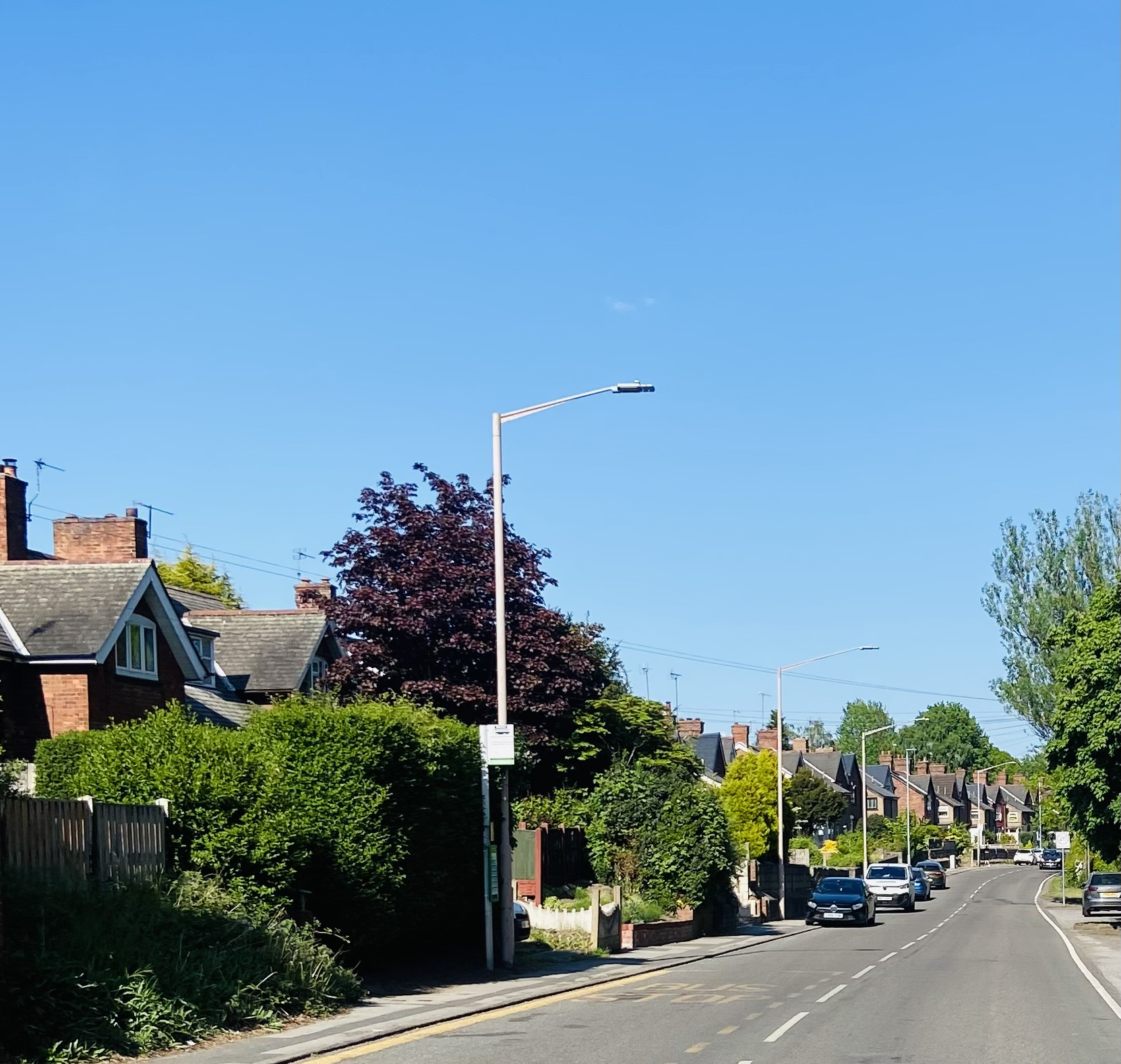
Netherfield Lane, Meden Vale

The economy was based mainly on Welbeck Colliery, which started up when two shafts were sunk between 1912 and 1915. It was determined by owner UK Coal for closure in 2007 due to limited reserves, with the last coal produced 11 May 2010. Most of the working-age employees from the 410 total transferred to other collieries operated by UK Coal, including Daw Mill near Coventry, a daily round-trip of 140 mi (230 km) for some. When closed it was one of the last remaining deep mine collieries to operate in England, and at its peak employed 1,400 men and produced 1.5 million tonnes of coal yearly.

The headstocks were demolished by explosives in April 2011.

=== Explosion ===
Two security guards were badly injured in an explosion confined to a surface electrical substation at the Colliery site on Saturday 31 December 2011.

=== Site regeneration ===
As part of reclamation of the site, a biogas facility based on anaerobic digestion producing methane for sale into the UK gas distribution grid was created in 2017, the first stage in an intended employment park.

A large solar farm based on an extensive array of Solar panels having a 33kV connection into the UK electricity distribution grid is located nearby.

== Amenities ==
There is a small collection of shops, Post Office, a garage and the Three Lions public house.

The River Meden flows through the village alongside the main road. The village has a rugby union side which plays in the RFU Midlands 5 East (North) division.

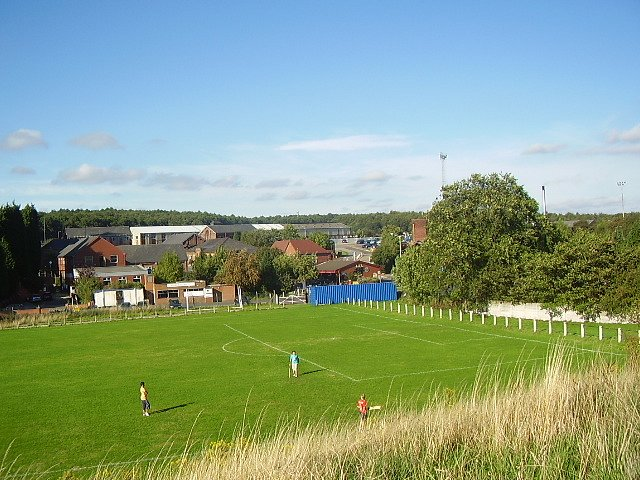
The Football Pitch, Meden Vale

== Politics ==
Meden Vale is part of the Mansfield Parliamentary constituency from the 2010 boundary changes, represented by Labour's Steve Yemm after the July 2024 general election, and previously from 2017 to 2024 by Ben Bradley of the Conservative Party. It is in the civil parish of Warsop.
