= Jake Ball (cricketer) =

English cricketer (born 1991)

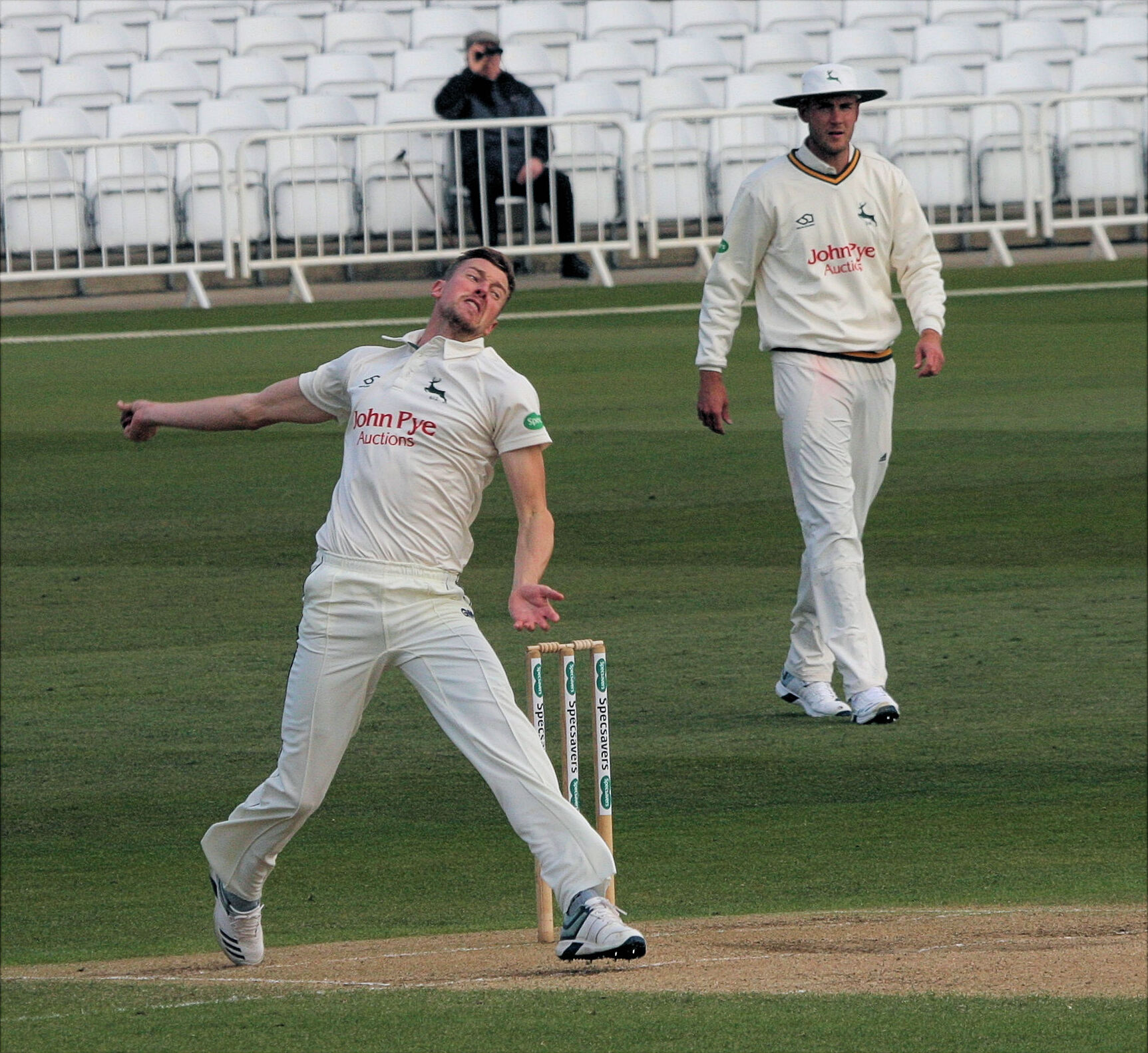
- Ball in 2019

Personal information
- Full name: Jacob Timothy Ball
- Born: 14 March 1991 (age 35); Mansfield, Nottinghamshire, England
- Height: 6 ft 5.5 in (1.97 m)
- Batting: Right-handed
- Bowling: Right-arm fast-medium
- Role: Bowler
- Relatives: Bruce French (uncle); Neil French (uncle)

International information
- National side: England (2016–2018)
- Test debut (cap 671): 14 July 2016 v Pakistan
- Last Test: 23 November 2017 v Australia
- ODI debut (cap 245): 7 October 2016 v Bangladesh
- Last ODI: 24 June 2018 v Australia
- T20I debut (cap 82): 6 July 2018 v India
- Last T20I: 8 July 2018 v India

Domestic team information
- Years: Team
- 2009–2023: Nottinghamshire (squad no. 28)
- 2020/21: Sydney Sixers (squad no. 24)
- 2021–2024: Welsh Fire
- 2024–present: Somerset (squad no. 14)
- 2025: → Durham (loan)
- 2025: → Kent (loan)

Career statistics
Competition	Test	ODI	FC	LA
Matches	4	18	94	108
Runs scored	67	38	1,224	218
Batting average	8.37	9.50	12.36	8.72
100s/50s	0/0	0/0	0/0	0/0
Top score	31	28	49*	28
Balls bowled	612	947	14,068	4,705
Wickets	3	21	271	139
Bowling average	114.33	46.66	29.89	32.33
5 wickets in innings	0	1	8	1
10 wickets in match	0	0	0	0
Best bowling	1/47	5/51	6/49	5/51
Catches/stumpings	1/–	5/–	17/–	23/–
- Source: ESPNcricinfo, 22 September 2026

Jacob Timothy Ball (born 14 March 1991) is an English cricketer. Ball is a right-handed batsman who bowls right-arm fast-medium pace. He was born in Mansfield, Nottinghamshire, England and educated at the Meden School in Market Warsop. On 14 July 2016 he made his Test debut for England against Pakistan. His uncle, Bruce French, also played Test cricket for England and was chosen to present Ball with his England cap before his Test debut in July 2016.

== Under-19s Career ==
Ball made his debut for England Under-19s in July 2010, playing two Youth Test matches against Sri Lanka Under-19s at the County Ground, Northampton and North Marine Road Ground, Scarborough. It was during this series that he made his only Youth One Day International appearance at Fenner's, Cambridge and his only Youth Twenty20 International appearance at the Riverside Ground, Chester-le-Street.

== Domestic career ==
Ball made his debut for Nottinghamshire in a List A match in the 2009 Pro40 against Sussex in what was his only appearance that season. He was notably West Indian Dwayne Smith's hat-trick wicket in this match. He next appeared for Nottinghamshire in the 2010 season in the 2010 Clydesdale Bank 40 against Leicestershire, again his only appearance in that season. In the 2011 season, he made his first-class debut in the season starting Champion County match against the Marylebone Cricket Club at the Sheikh Zayed Cricket Stadium in Abu Dhabi. He bowled five wicketless overs in the Marylebone Cricket Club's first-innings, while in Nottinghamshire's first-innings he was dismissed for 4 by Hamid Hassan. In the Marylebone Cricket Club's second-innings, he ended with figures of 3/72 from 16 overs. He ended Nottinghamshire's second-innings unbeaten on zero, with Nottinghamshire losing the match by 174 runs.

Though this was his only first-class appearance that season, he did make five further List A appearances for the county. To date, he has taken a total of 6 wickets in these matches, which have come at an average of 42.33, with best figures of 3/32, while with the bat he has scored 41 runs in five innings at a batting average of 20.50, with a high score of 19 not out. He also made a single Twenty20 appearance against Lancashire in the Friends Provident t20 at Old Trafford.

In February 2022, he was retained by Welsh Fire for the 2022 season of The Hundred.

In October 2023, following his release from Nottinghamshire, Ball signed a two-year deal with Somerset with the option to extend for a third year.

He had short-term loan spells at Durham and Kent in the 2025 season.

In August 2026, Ball agreed a one-year extension to his contract at Somerset, tying him into the club until at least the end of the 2027 season.

== International career ==
In May 2016, he received his maiden call to play for England national cricket team against Sri Lanka for the opening match at Headingley. Ball was not selected for the final XI, but did make his Test debut two months later, in the first Test against Pakistan at Lord's. Ball took figures of 1–51 in Pakistan's first innings, but failed to take a wicket in the second innings. Pakistan went on to win the match by 75 runs.

In his debut ODI against Bangladesh, Ball took figures of 5–51 to help England win the first match by 21 runs. In doing so he became the first English player to take a five wicket haul on their ODI debut. In the second ODI, he finished with 2-44, but England lost by 34 runs to leave the series tied at 1-1. In the final match of the series, Ball did not take a wicket a finished with 0-44, but England won the match by 4 wickets to win the series 2–1.

Ball played in the fourth Test match against India, with England already 2–0 down in the series. He took 1–47 in India's first innings, as England lost the match by an innings and 36 runs. He kept his place for the final Test of the series, and took figures of 0–93 as India scored 759/7 and won the match by an innings and 75 runs, losing the series 4–0.

In the first ODI against India Ball took figures of 3–67 as England lost by three wickets. In the second match he took 0–80 as India posted 381/6 and England lost by 15 runs. In the third ODI he took 2–56 as England won by 5 runs.

In June 2018, he was named in England's Twenty20 International (T20I) squad for the series against India. He made his T20I debut for England on 6 July 2018.
