= Parliament Oak =

Tree in England

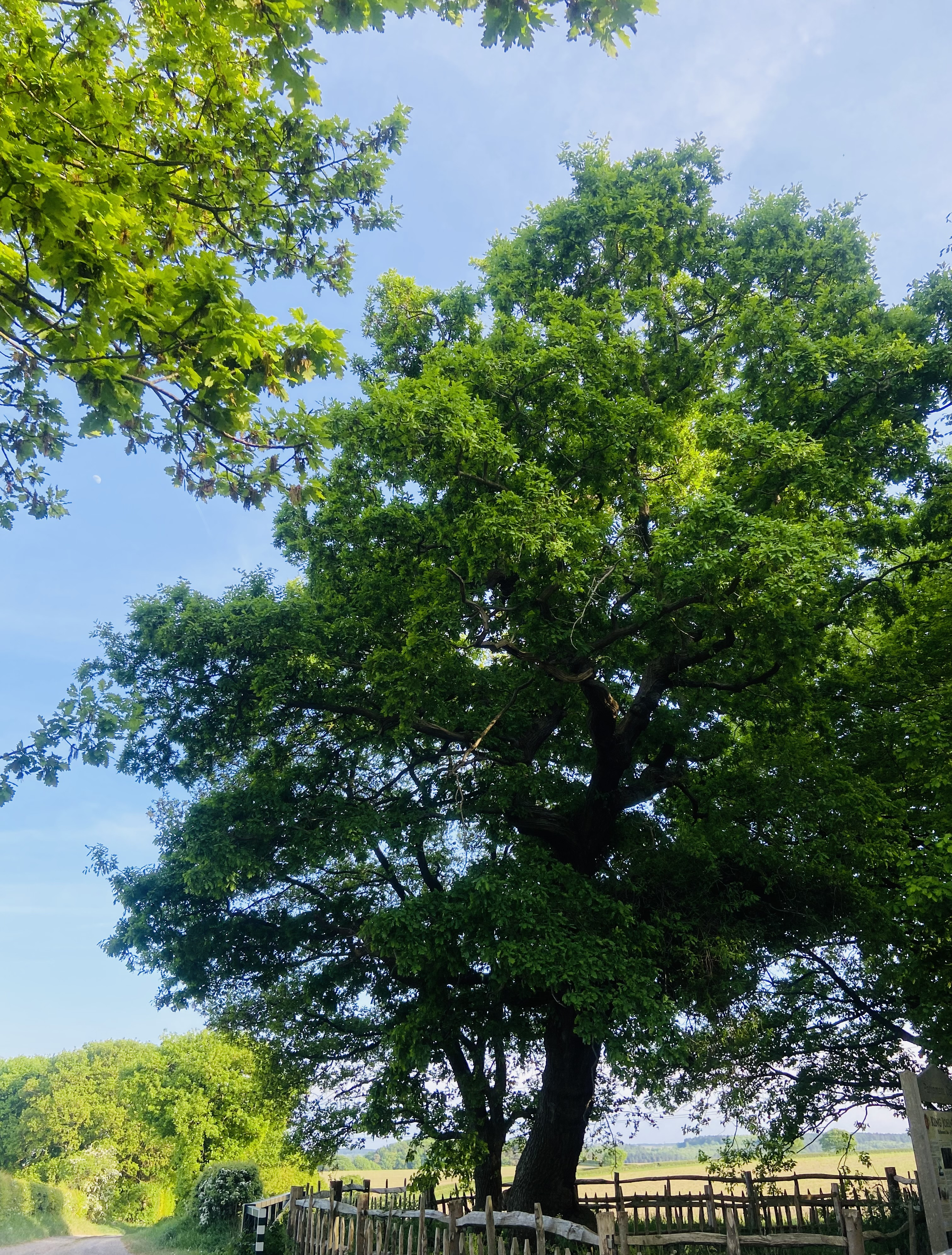
- The Parliament Oak
- Interactive map of Parliament Oak
- Location: Peafield Lane, Nottinghamshire
- Coordinates: 53.1873°N 1.1398°W
- Custodian: The Sherwood Forest Trust
- Website: https://sherwoodforest.org.uk/

The Parliament Oak is a veteran tree in Sherwood Forest. It is reputed to have been the site for impromptu-parliaments held by King John and Edward I. In the 19th century the tree was propped up by William Bentinck, 4th Duke of Portland. The tree was shortlisted for the 2017 Woodland Trust Tree of the Year award.

== History ==
The tree stood around 1.5 miles (2.4 km) from King John's Palace at Clipstone. King John stayed at the palace from around the time of his 1199 accession for hunting in Clipstone Park, part of Sherwood Forest. Clipstone was one of the oldest parks in England, being enclosed for hunting since before the 1066 Norman Conquest. The Parliament Oak is thought to date from around this time, being of comparable age to the Major Oak, which has been estimated to be 800–1000 years old.

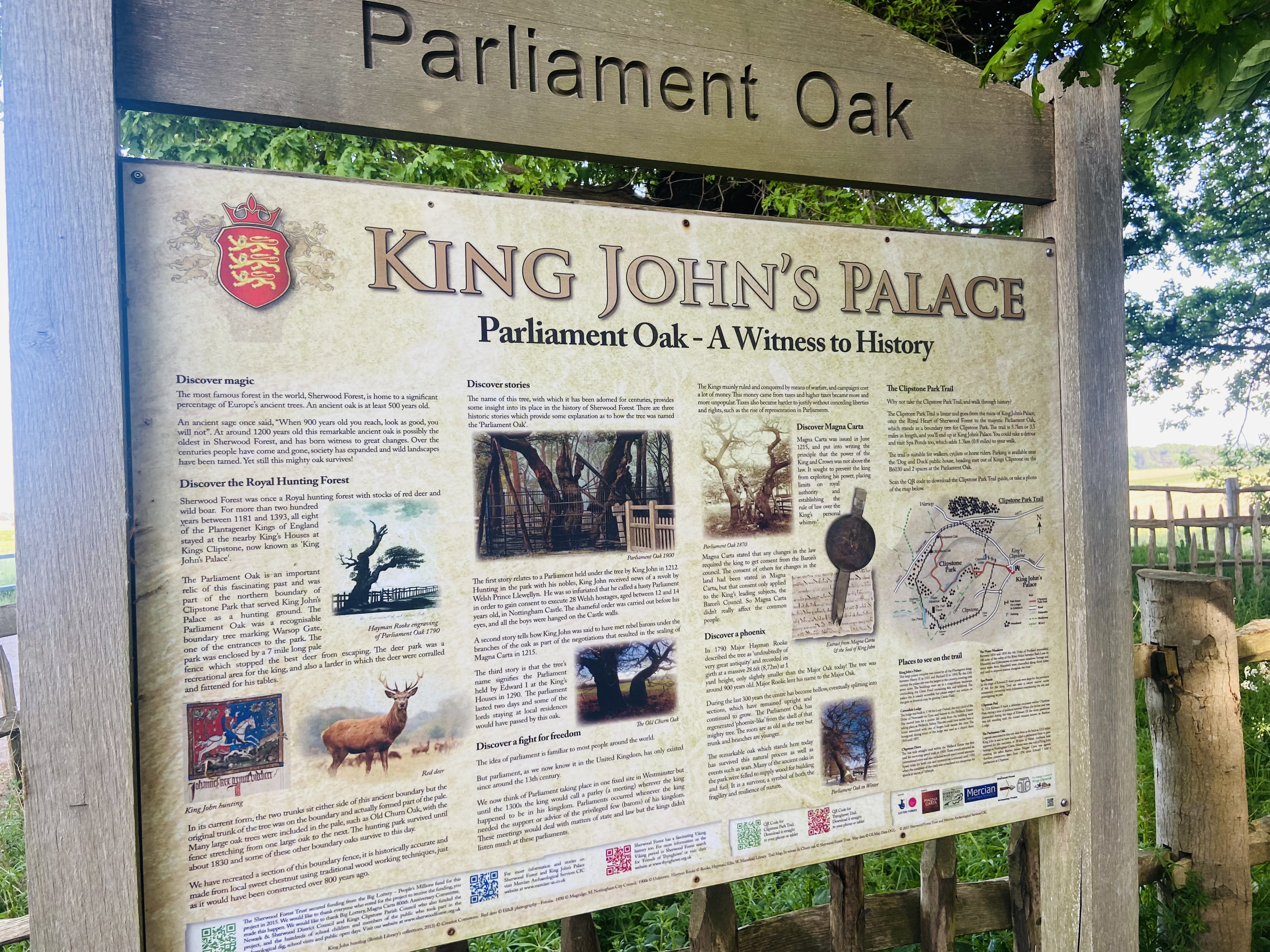
Parliament Oak information board

It is said that John hastily assembled a parliament at the tree in 1212 upon being informed, whilst hunting, that revolts against his rule had broken out in Wales and Northern England. He is thought to have decreed that 28 Welsh boys held as hostages at Nottingham Castle were to be put to death as a consequence. Other English kings of this time, including Edward I, also stayed at Clipstone for the hunting. Edward is also said to have assembled a parliament at the tree on Michaelmas (29 September) 1290, whilst travelling to Scotland. It is thought this story is more likely to be true than the legend of John's parliament; it was not uncommon for parliaments to be held outdoors in this period, particularly when discussing matters such as the royal forests.

The tree was drawn in 1790, at which point it measured 28 feet 6 inches (8.69 m) in circumference at a height of 1 yard (0.91 m). By 1843 it stood on the Ollerton high road, at a point 4 miles (6.4 km) from Ollerton and on the fringe of what remained of Sherwood Forest. It measured 25 feet (7.6 m) in circumference at a height of 4 feet (1.2 m) from the ground and had a large hollow within it that could accommodate six men. The Parliament Oak was owned at this time by William Bentinck, 4th Duke of Portland who feared it was in danger of dying. He ordered a support framework erected to reinforce the tree against gales. He also planted an acorn within the hollow trunk to grow a replacement.

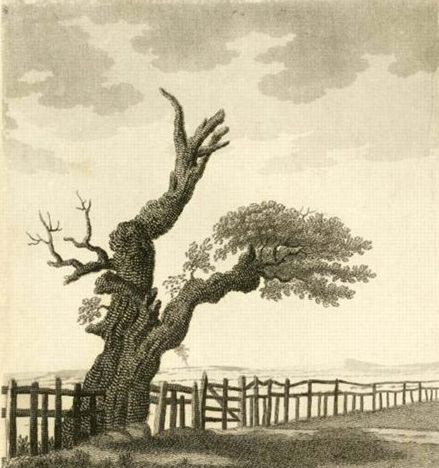
A 1790 depiction

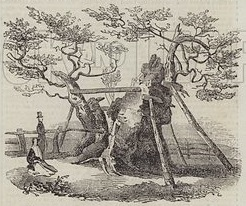
As depicted in The Illustrated London News, 23 September 1843

== Recent developments ==
The tree stands at the edge of Clipstone Forest, in an access off the A6075 and is looked after by The Sherwood Forest Trust. Its proximity to the road has placed it at risk of damage and it has previously been threatened by fly-tipping and overgrowth of nearby vegetation. A fence constructed to protect the tree was destroyed and in 2007 The Independent newspaper described the situation as "one of the biggest failings of our heritage protection laws". A £35,000 project led by The Sherwood Forest Trust and Nottinghamshire County Council was carried out in summer 2008 to restore the area, plant 33 yd (30 m) of new hedgerow, construct two car parking spaces and install an information plaque.

The Parliament Oak has been described as relatively unknown when compared with the Major Oak but was shortlisted for the 2017 Woodland Trust Tree of the Year award. A pub named after the oak stood in Mansfield Woodhouse until 2011 when it changed to retail pharmacy.
