= Mansfield District =

Coordinates: 53.15°N 1.20°W

- Non-metropolitan district
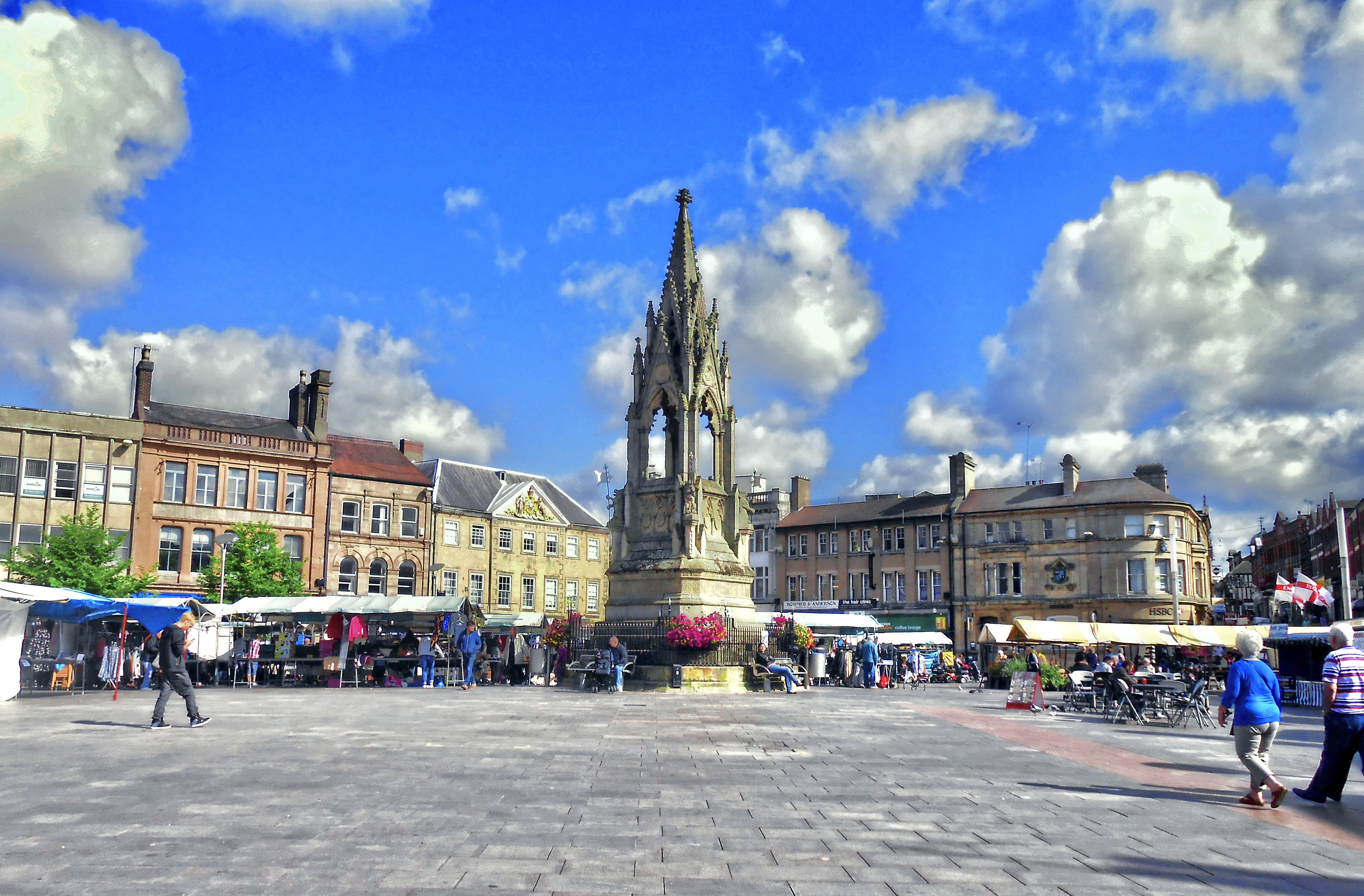
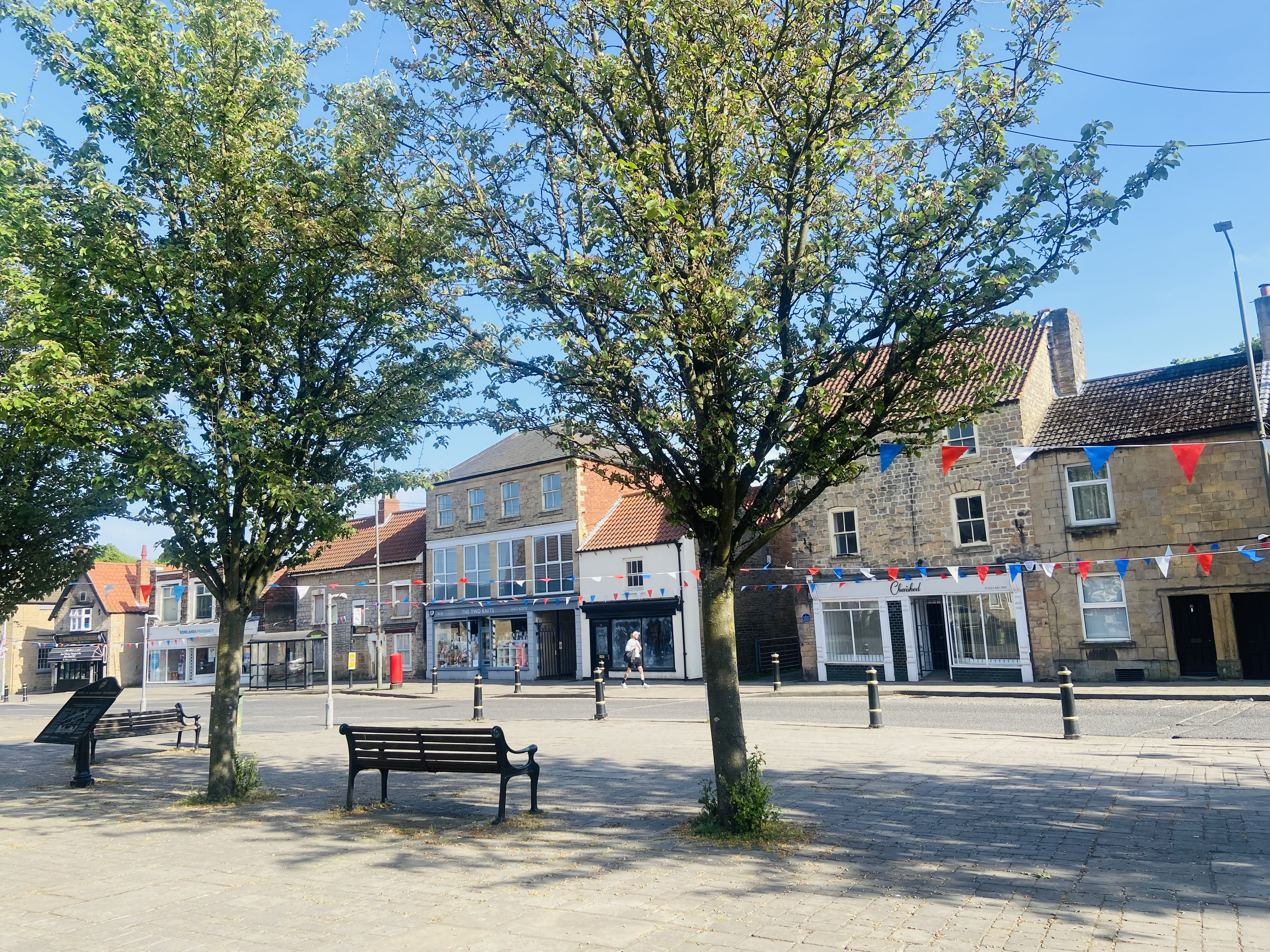
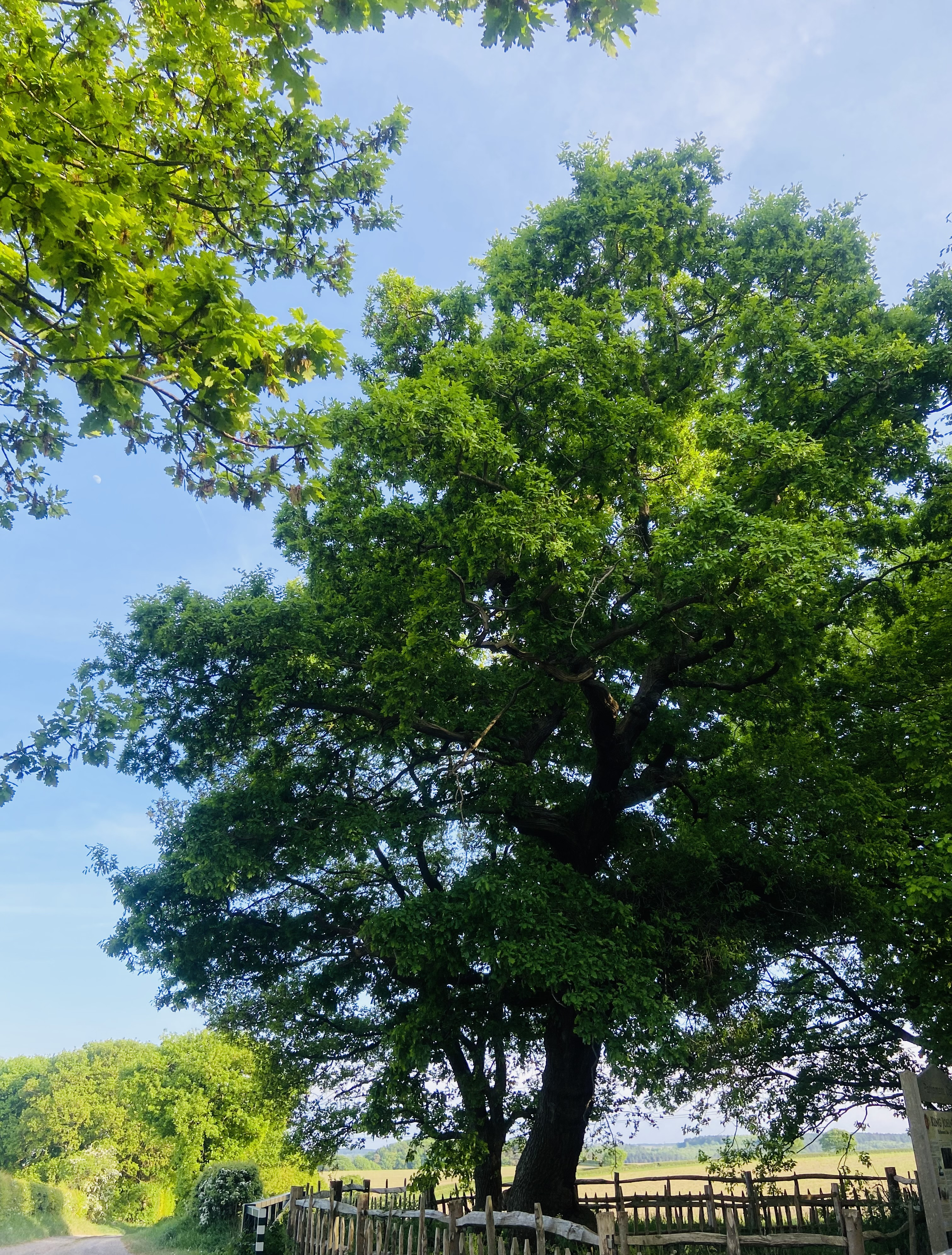
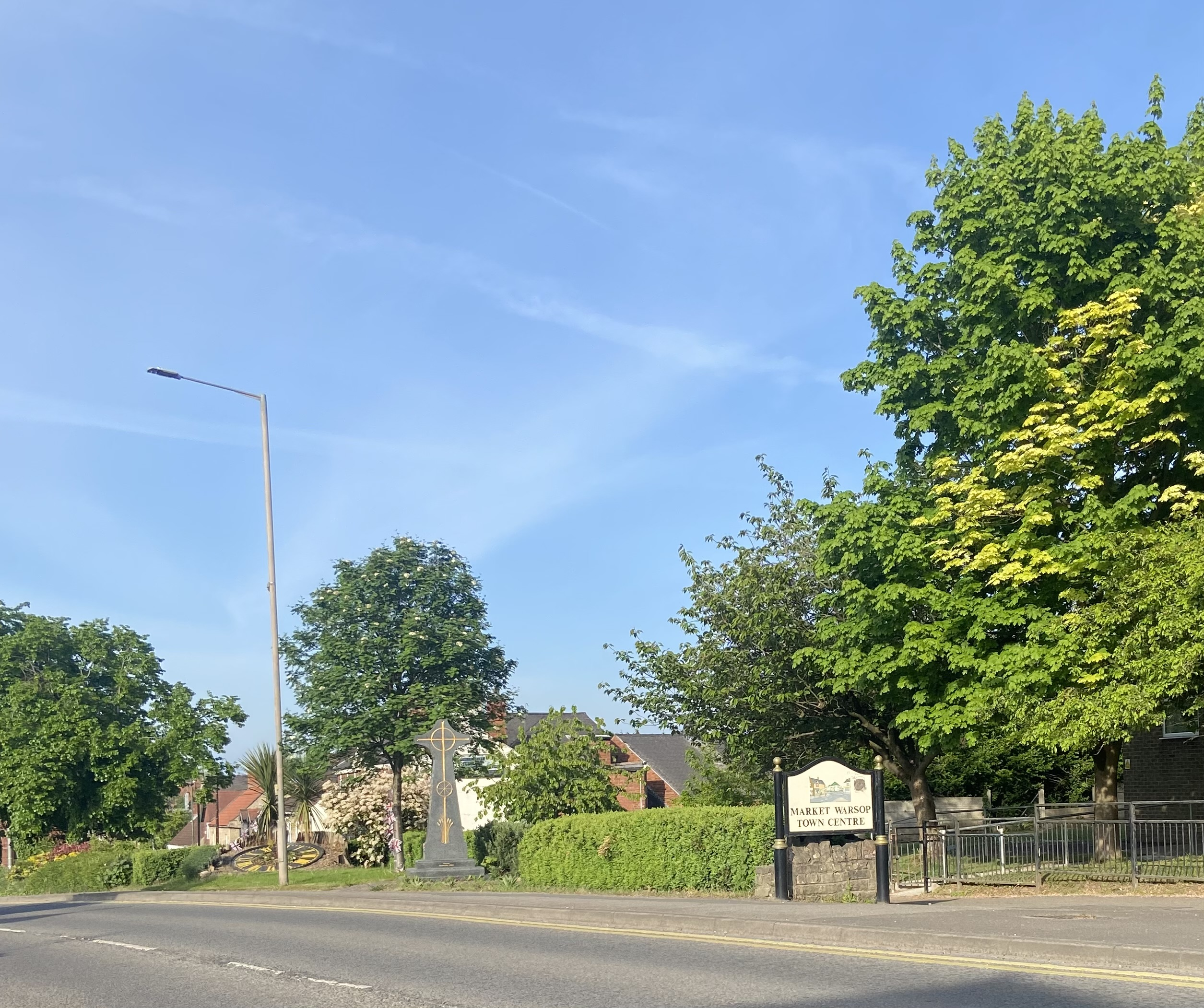
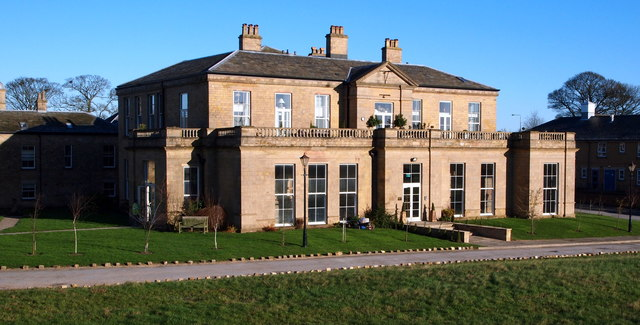
- Market Place and Cavendish Monument Mansfield Woodhouse Parliament Oak Market Warsop Berry Hill Hall

- Coat of arms

- Shown within Nottinghamshire
- Sovereign state: United Kingdom
- Constituent country: England
- Region: East Midlands
- Ceremonial county: Nottinghamshire
- Admin. HQ: Mansfield

Government
  - Type: Mansfield District Council
  - Mayor: Andy Abrahams (L)
  - MP: Steve Yemm (L)

Area
  - Total: 30 sq mi (77 km^{2})
  - Rank: 222nd

Population (2025)
  - Total: 113,682
  - Rank: Ranked 218th
  - Density: 3,800/sq mi (1,500/km^{2})

Ethnicity (2021)
  - Ethnic groups: List: 94.8% White; 2% Asian; 1.4% Mixed; 1.1% Black; 0.7% other

Religion (2021)
  - Religion: List: 49.2% Christianity; 48.2% no religion; 1.4% other; 1.2% Islam
- Time zone: UTC+0 (Greenwich Mean Time)
  - Summer (DST): UTC+1 (British Summer Time)
- ONS code: 37UF (ONS); E07000174 (GSS)

Mansfield District is a local government district in Nottinghamshire, England. It is named after the town of Mansfield, where the council is based. The district also contains Mansfield Woodhouse (which forms part of the Mansfield urban area) and Warsop.

The neighbouring districts are Bassetlaw, Newark and Sherwood, Ashfield and Bolsover.

== History ==
The town of Mansfield had been governed by improvement commissioners from 1823. They were replaced in 1891 when it was incorporated as a municipal borough.

The modern district was formed on 1 April 1974, under the Local Government Act 1972, following local elections on 7 June 1973. The new district covered the whole area of three former districts, which were all abolished at the same time:

- Mansfield Municipal Borough
- Mansfield Woodhouse Urban District
- Warsop Urban District

The new district was named Mansfield after its main town. Unusually for a district taking the same name as a former borough, the new Mansfield district was not granted borough status. Instead charter trustees were established for the area of the former borough of Mansfield, with responsibility for looking after the civic regalia of the town.

Since 2002 the council has been led by a directly elected mayor.

Under current local government reorganisation plans, all district councils in Nottinghamshire, as well as the county council, will be abolished in 2028, with the district becoming part of a new Nottinghamshire unitary authority. Andy Abrahams, incumbent Mayor from 2019, confirmed that the position would be abolished as part of the changes scheduled for 2028.

== Governance ==
Mansfield District Council

Type
- Type: Non-metropolitan district

Leadership
- Chair: Lynn Henshaw, Labour since 12 May 2026
- Mayor: Andy Abrahams, Labour since 6 May 2019
- Chief Executive: James Biddlestone since 3 February 2025

Structure
- Seats: 36 councillors plus elected mayor
- Graph of the party split among 37 seats.
- Political groups: Administration (27) Labour (27) Other parties (10) Conservative (4) Reform (3) Independent (3)

Elections
- Voting system: First past the post
- Last election: 4 May 2023
- Next election: 6 May 2027

Meeting place
- Civic Centre, Chesterfield Road South, Mansfield, NG19 7BH

Website
- mansfield.gov.uk

Mansfield District Council provides district-level services. County-level services are provided by Nottinghamshire County Council. Warsop is also a civil parish, which is a third tier of local government for that part of the district.

=== Political control ===
The council has been under Labour majority control since the 2023 election.

The first election to the modern district council was held in 1973, initially operating as a shadow authority alongside the outgoing authorities until coming into its powers on 1 April 1974. Since 1974 political control of the council has been as follows:

Party in control	Years
Labour	1974–2003
Mansfield Independent	2003–2011
Labour	2011–2015
Mansfield Independent	2015–2019
No overall control	2019–2023
Labour	2023–present

=== Leadership ===
From 1974 until 2002, political leadership was provided by the leader of the council. Only one person served as leader in that time:

Councillor	Party	From	To
Jim Hawkins	Labour	1974	2002

In 2002 the council changed to having a directly elected mayor. The mayors since 2002 have been: (Note: Mayoral terms of office run from the fourth day after polling day.)

Mayor	Party	From	To
Tony Egginton	Mansfield Independent	21 Oct 2002	10 May 2015
Kate Allsop	Mansfield Independent	11 May 2015	5 May 2019
Andy Abrahams	Labour	6 May 2019	

=== Composition ===
Following the 2023 election, and subsequent by-elections and changes of allegiance up to May 2025, the composition of the council (excluding the elected mayor's seat) was:

Party	Seats
Labour	26
Conservative	4
Reform	3
Independent	3
Total	36

The next full election is due in May 2027.

=== Elections ===
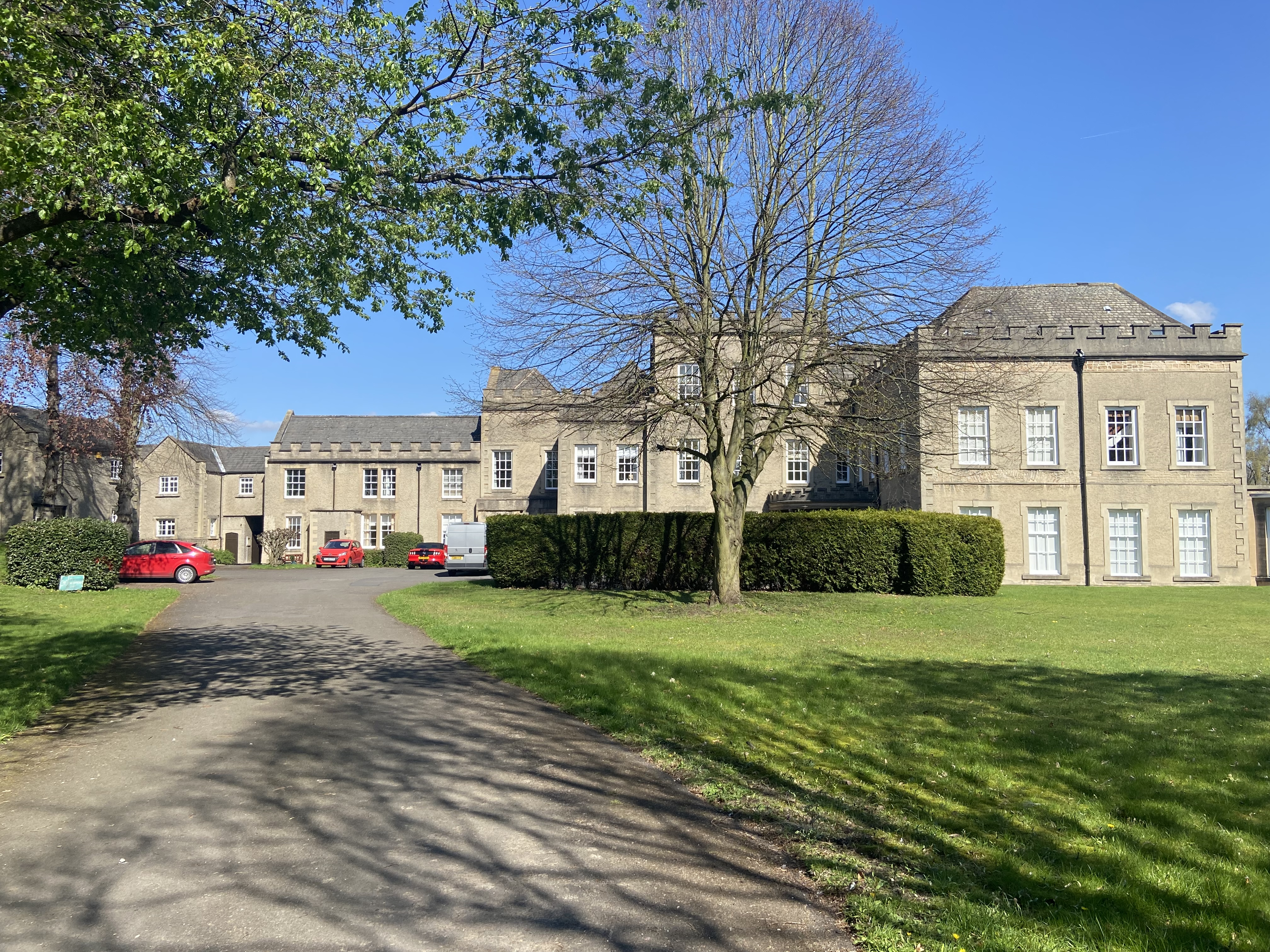
The Manor House, former headquarters of Mansfield Woodhouse Urban District Council, in the second-largest settlement of the district

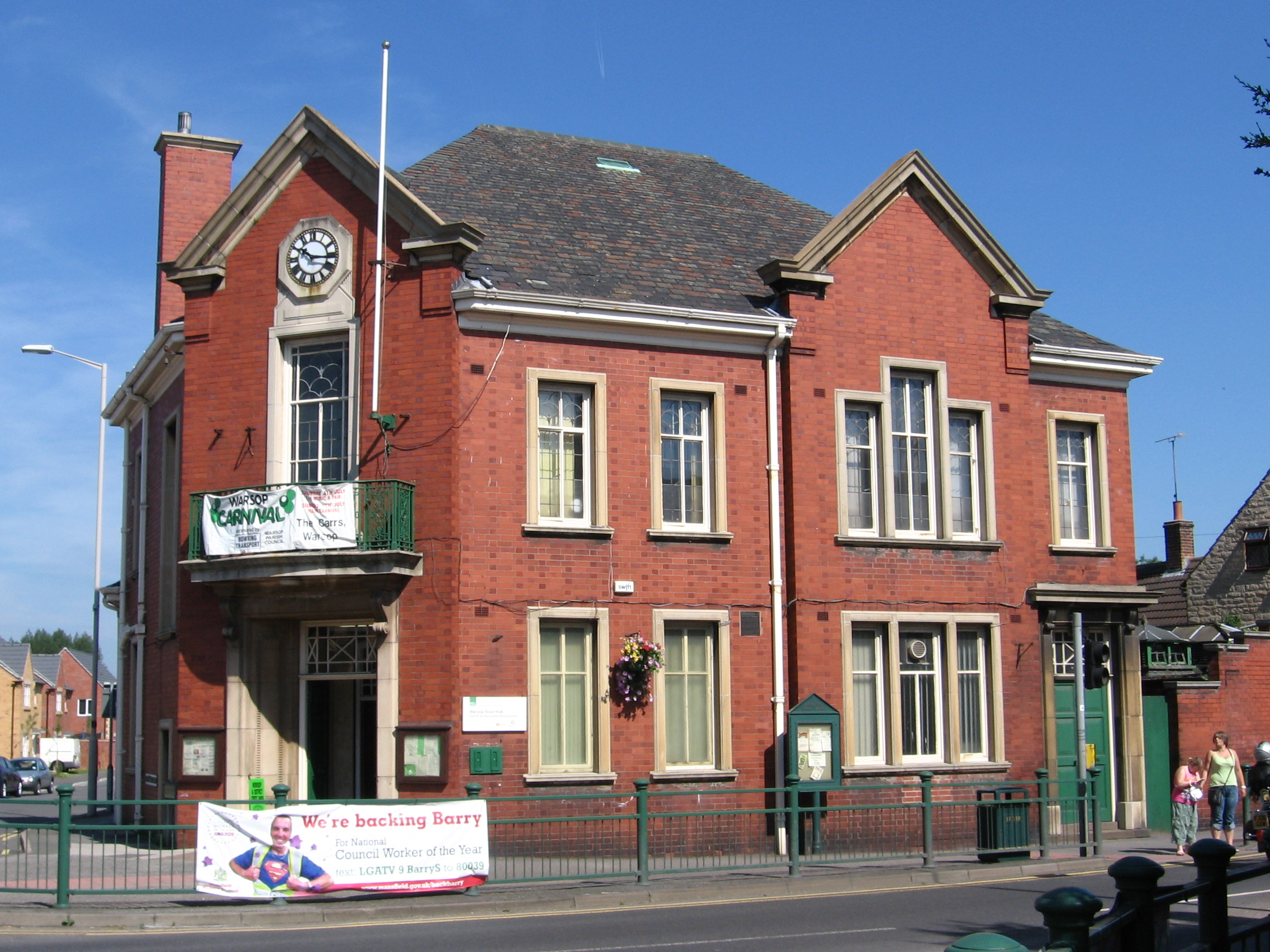
Warsop old Town Hall, in the third-largest settlement of the district

Since the last boundary changes in 2023 the district has been divided in 36 wards, each of which elects one councillor. Elections are held every four years.

=== Premises ===
The council is based at the Civic Centre on Chesterfield Road South in Mansfield. The building was purpose-built for the council at a cost of £6.7 million and opened on 1 September 1986.

In 2023, Mansfield District Council was awarded £20 million of funding from the UK Government for the Mansfield Connect Project, which aims to regenerate the former Beales department store into a replacement district council headquarters and multi-agency and community hub. The building was handed back to the council by the contractor after phase one completion from June 2026. A major rationale for relocating administrative staff en mass into the town centre to boost retail trade was mooted by then-mayor Tony Egginton in 2009.

== Geography ==
Mansfield and Mansfield Woodhouse form a single urban area, which also includes Forest Town. The only civil parish in the district is Warsop; the rest of the district, corresponding to the combined area of the pre-1974 borough of Mansfield and Mansfield Woodhouse urban district, is an unparished area. The parish of Warsop contains the settlements of Market Warsop, Church Warsop and Meden Vale plus surrounding rural areas, including areas of woodland which form part of Sherwood Forest. Part of the urban area of Pleasley, most of which is in the Bolsover district of Derbyshire, extends across the boundary into Mansfield district.

== Arms ==
Coat of arms of Mansfield District

Notes
Granted 10 June 1987.
Crest
On a wreath Or and Azure on a mount Vert an oak tree Proper between two lions rampant combatant Or armed and langued Gules the dexter lion supporting by its sinister paw a pickaxe passing behind the tree in bend the haft Or the sinister lion supporting by its sinister paw a pickaxe passing in front of the tree in bend sinister its haft also Or and the blades of both Sable resting upon the ground.
Escutcheon
Quarterly Or and Azure in dexter chief and in sinister chief a Roman helmet proper lined Gules and in base the attires of a stag conjoined at their burrs Proper over all a cross flory per cross counterchanged of the field.
Supporters
On the dexter side a stag per fesse Verte and Or semée of oak Leaves counterchanged attired and unguled Gold langued Gules and gorged with a duke's coronet Or and on the sinister side a lion per fesse Vert and Or semée of oak leaves counterchanged armed and langued Gules and gorged with a duke's coronet Gold.
Motto
Sicut Quercus Virescit Industria (Industry Flourishes Like The Oak)
Badge
The attires of a stag conjoined at their burrs Proper braced at their beams with a cross flory per cross Azure and Or.

== See also ==
- Mansfield (UK Parliament constituency)
