= Mansfield =

Market town in Nottinghamshire, England

Coordinates: 53°08′40″N 1°11′47″W

- Town
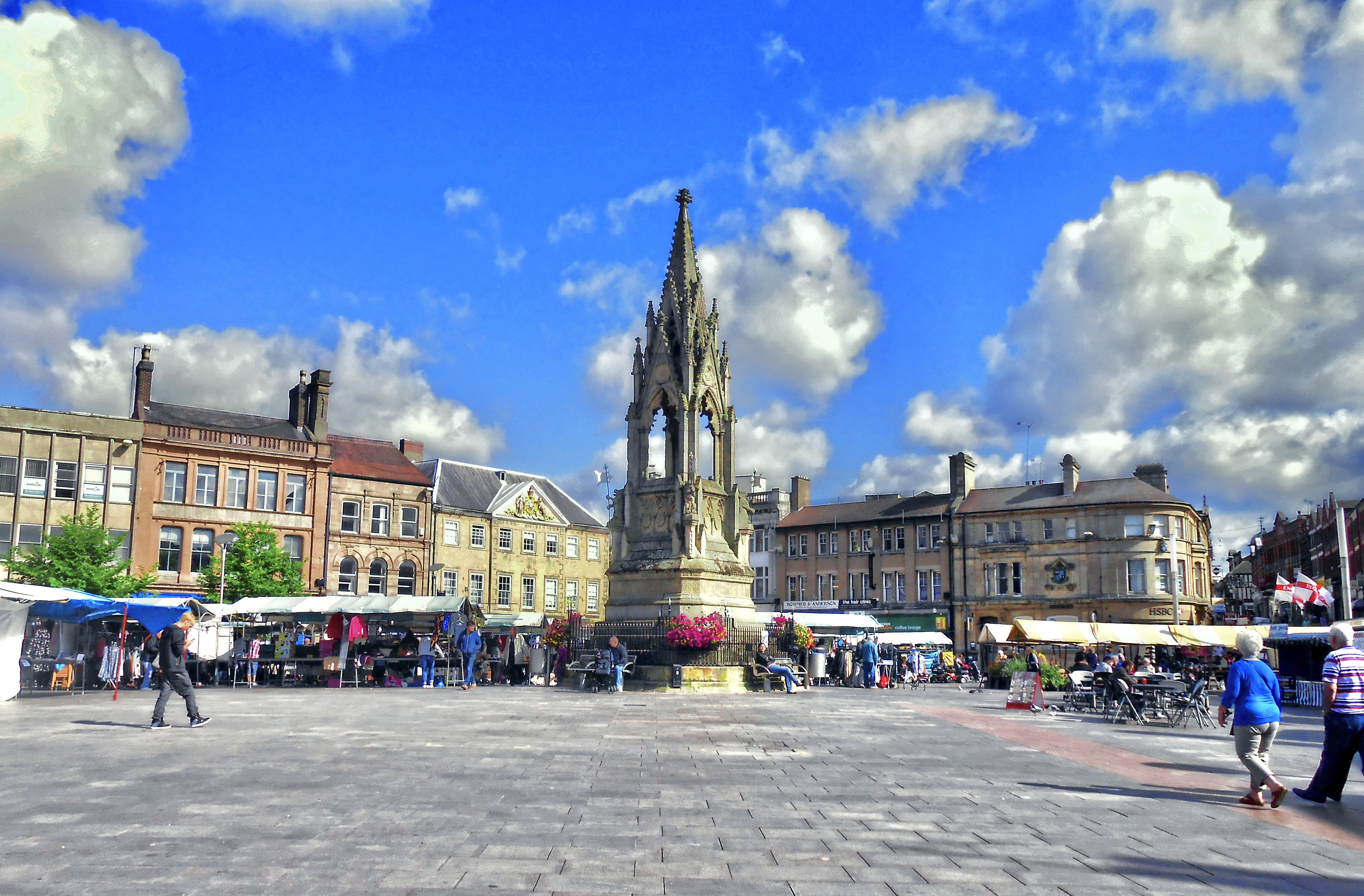
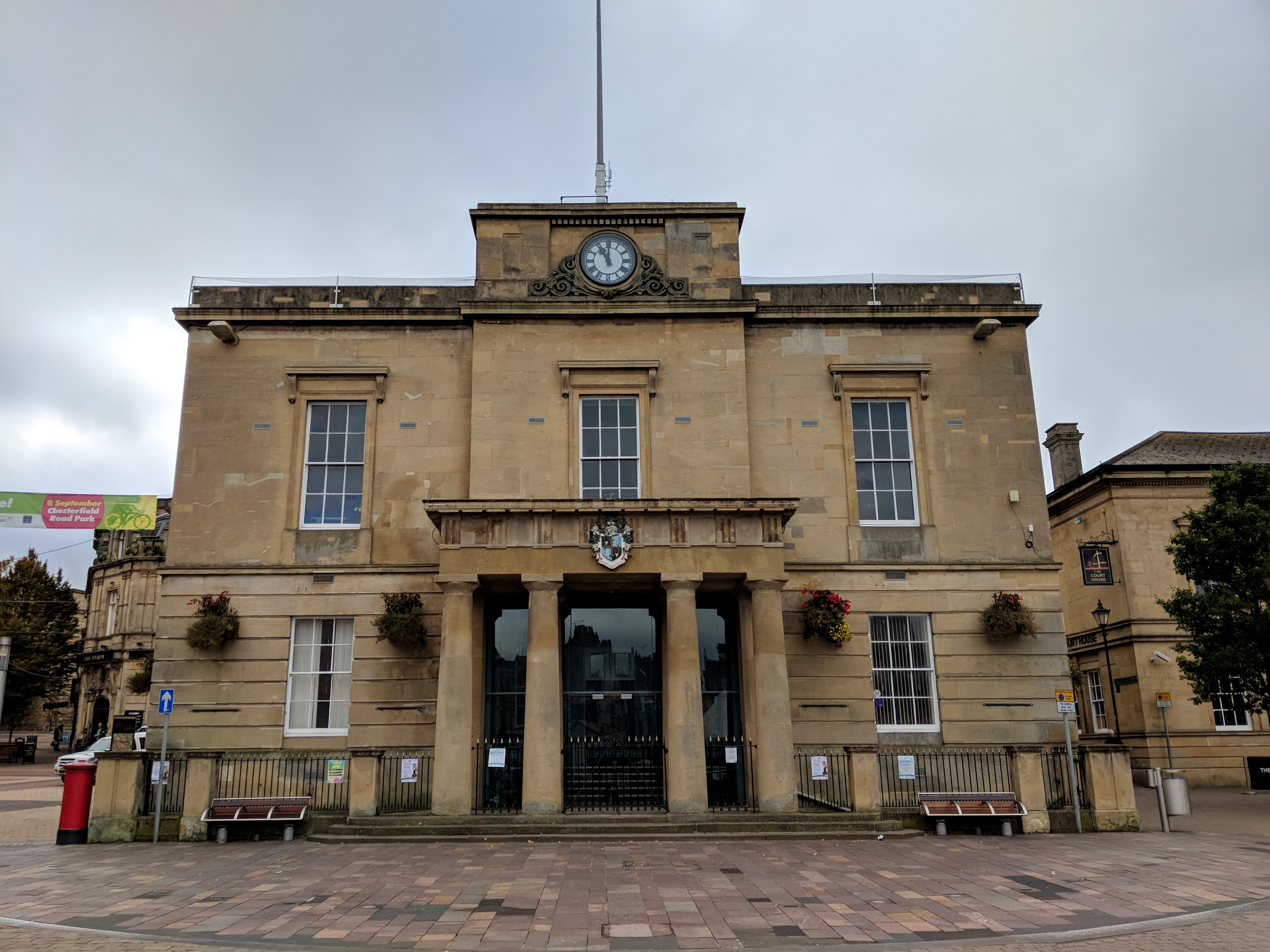
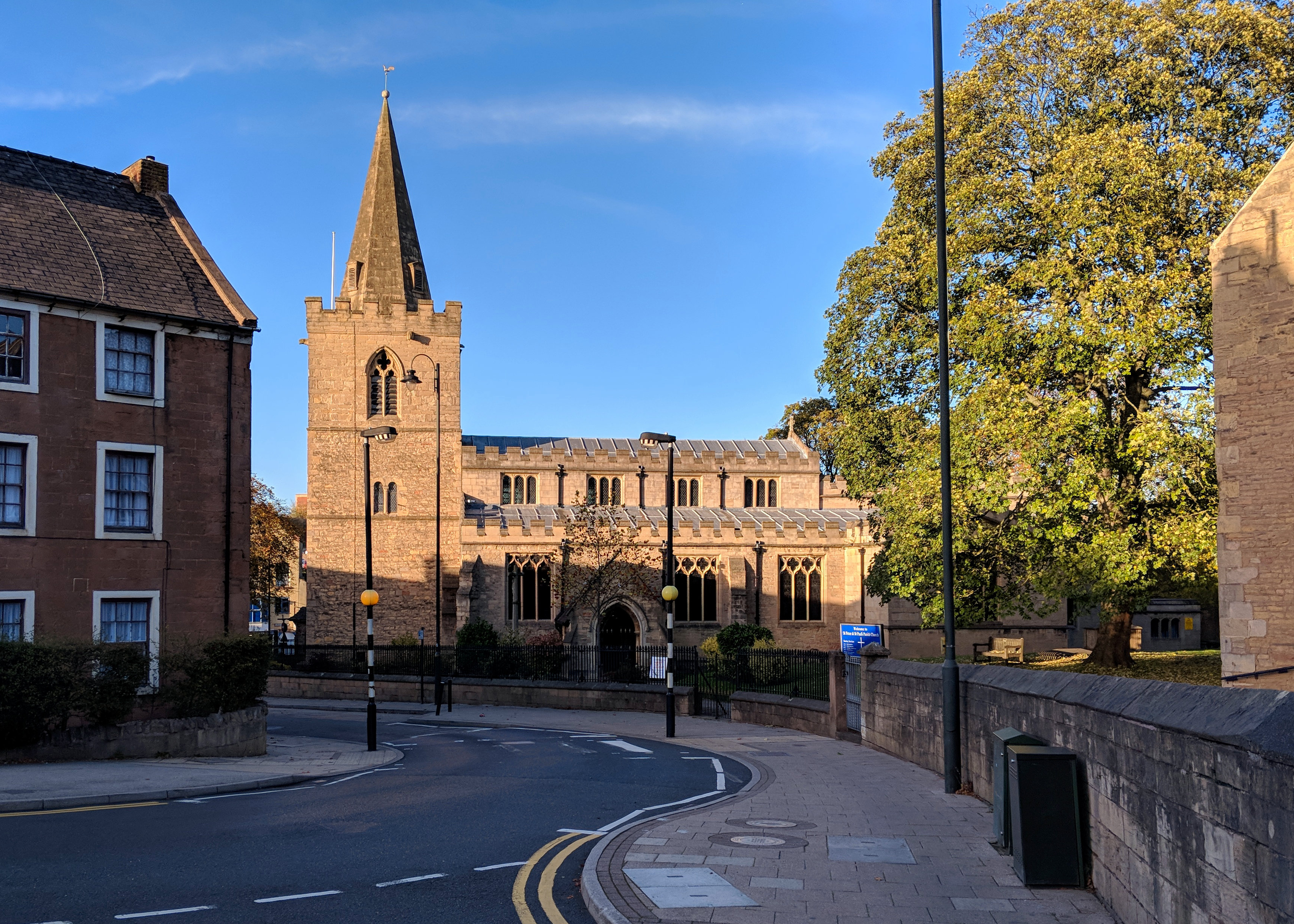
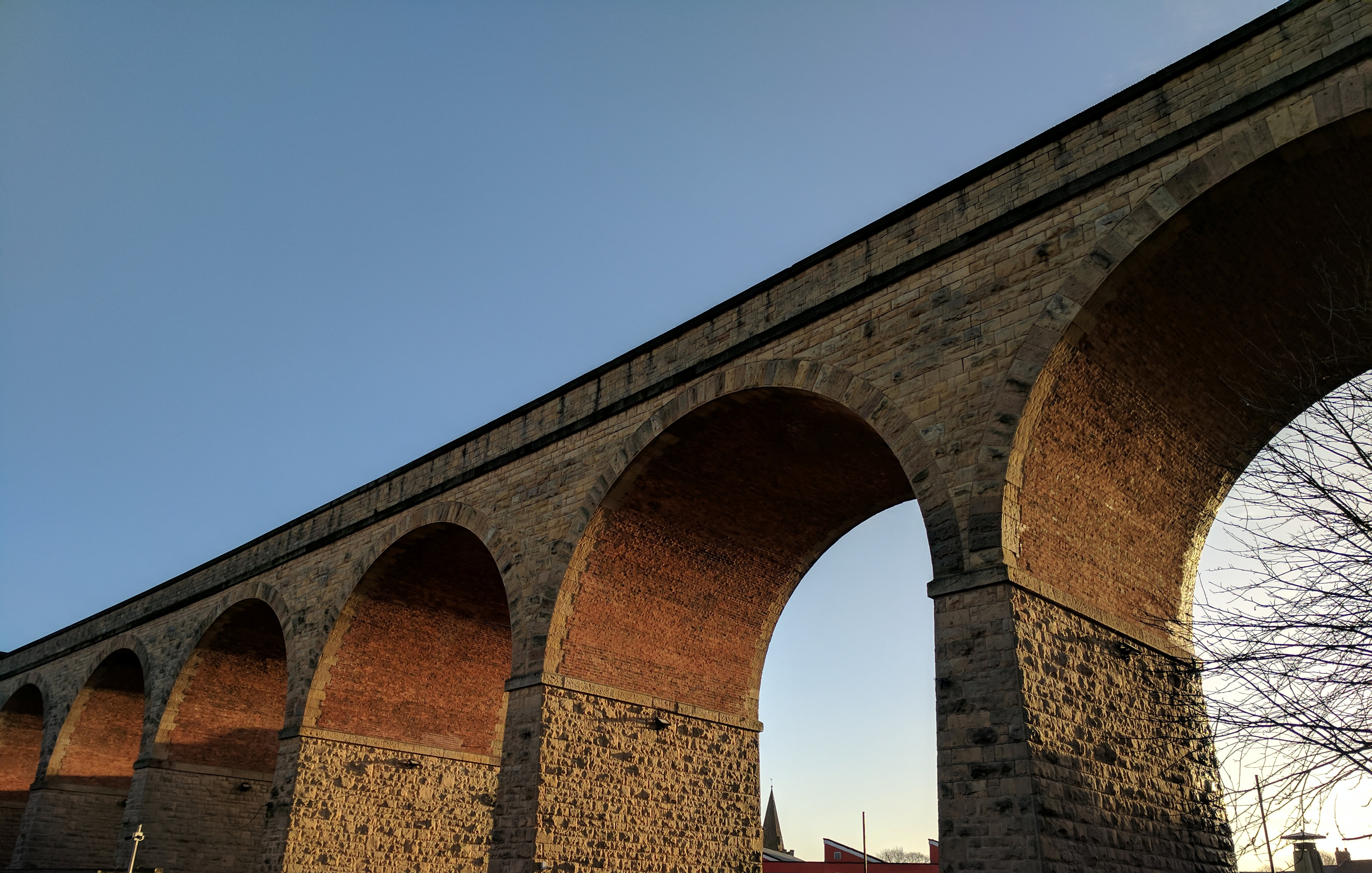
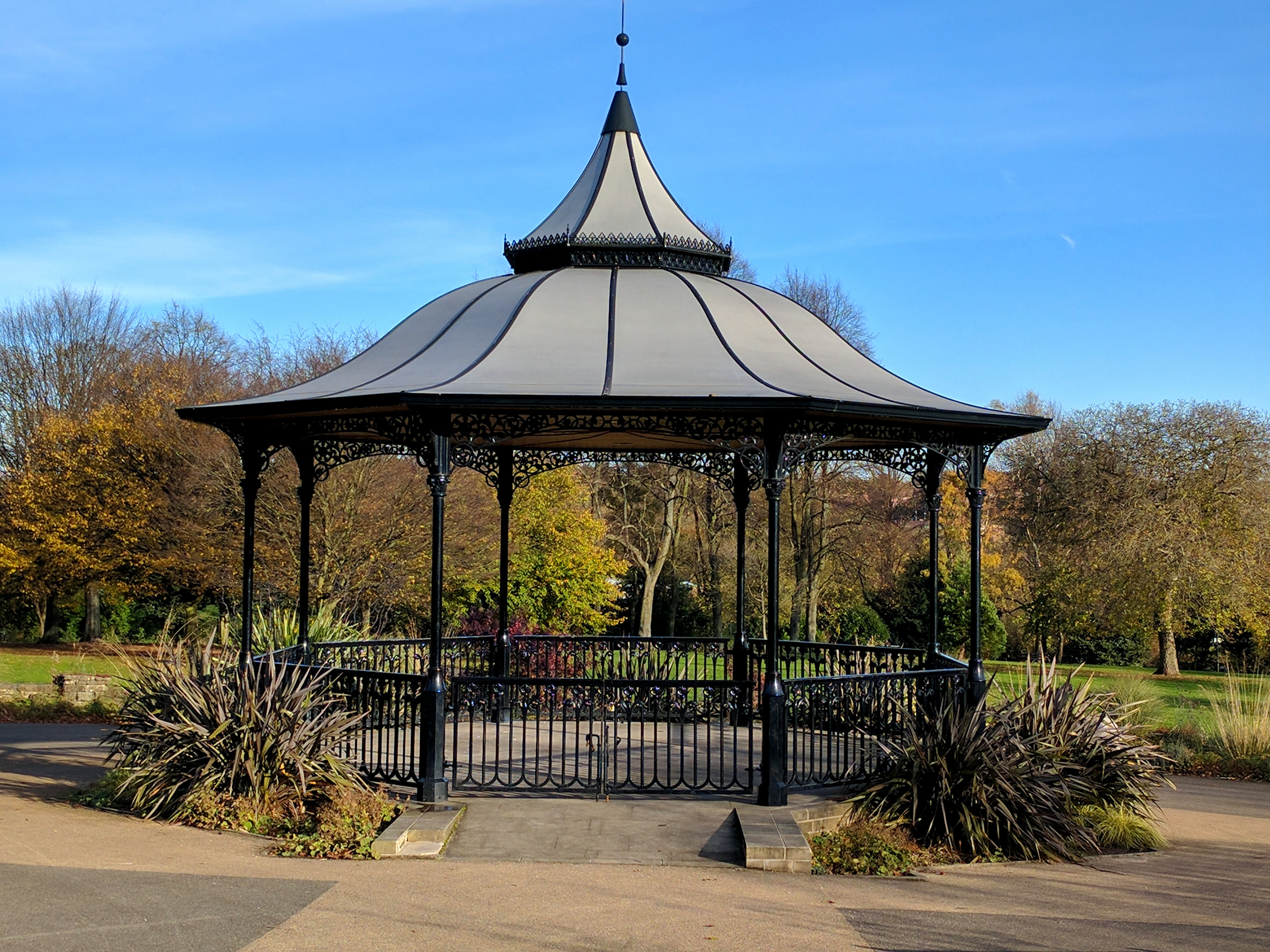
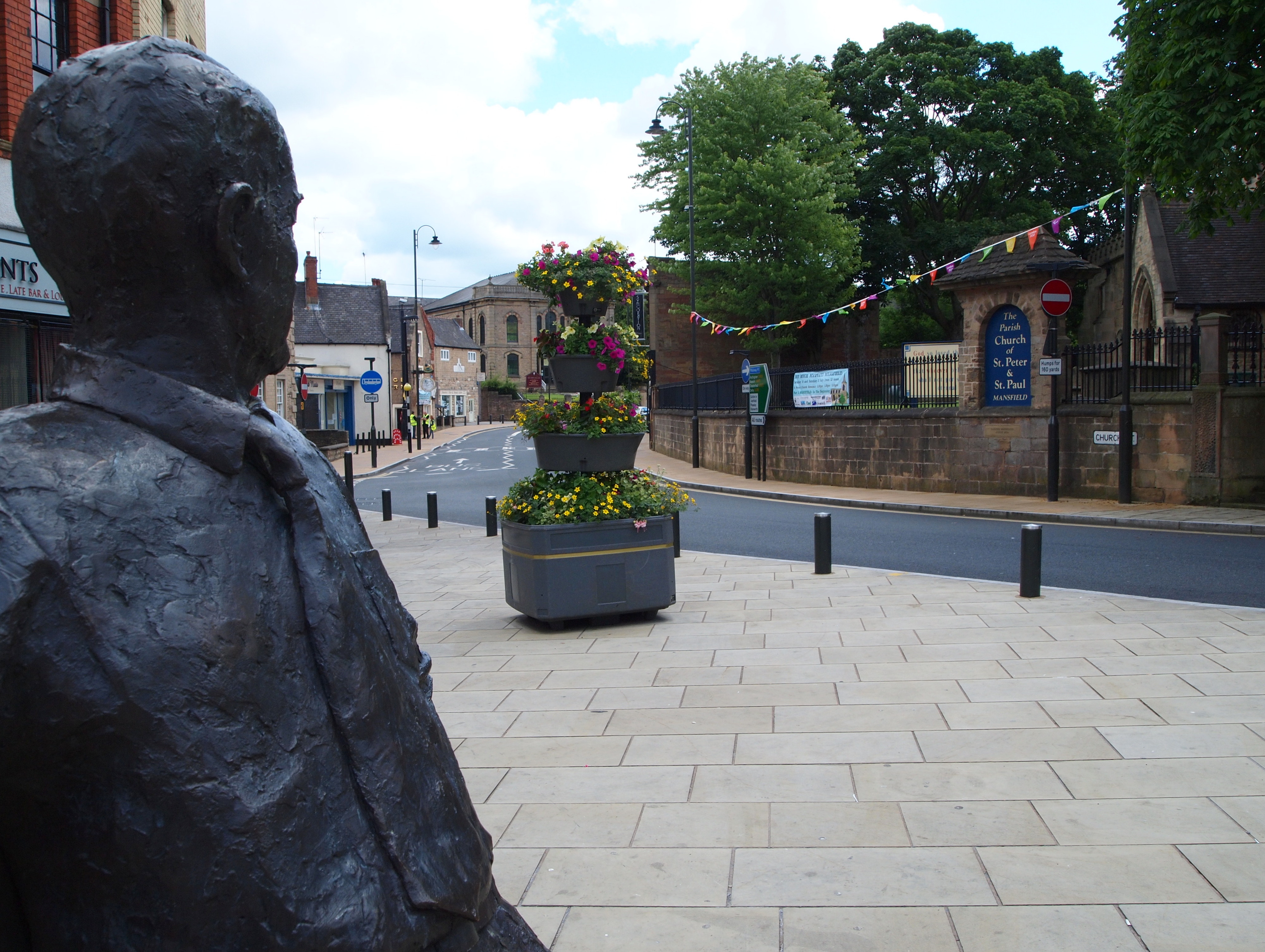
- Market Place and Cavendish Monument Old Town Hall St Peter's Church Railway Viaduct Carr Bank Park Church Street

- Coat of arms

- Location within Nottinghamshire
- Population: 97,831 (2021 census)
- OS grid reference: SK 53745 61114
  - London: 140.9 miles
- District: Mansfield
- Shire county: Nottinghamshire
- Region: East Midlands
- Country: England
- Sovereign state: United Kingdom
- Areas of the town: List: Berry Hill; Forest Town; Ladybrook; Mansfield Woodhouse; Oakham; Pleasley (part); Pleasley Vale; Town Centre
- Post town: MANSFIELD
- Postcode district: NG18, NG19
- Dialling code: 01623
- Police: Nottinghamshire
- Fire: Nottinghamshire
- Ambulance: East Midlands
- UK Parliament: Mansfield
- Website: mansfield.gov.uk

Mansfield /ˈmænzfiːld/ is a market town and the administrative centre of the Mansfield District, in Nottinghamshire, England. It is the largest town in the wider Mansfield urban area and the second largest settlement in the county, after the city of Nottingham. Henry III granted Mansfield the Royal Charter of a market town in 1227. The town lies in the Maun Valley, 12 miles (19 km) north of Nottingham. The district had a population of 110,500 at the 2021 census. Mansfield is the one local authority in Nottinghamshire with a publicly elected mayor, the Mayor of Mansfield. In ancient times, it became the pre-eminent in importance amongst the towns of Sherwood Forest.

== Toponymy ==
There is a dispute as to the origins of the name. Three conjectures have been considered: the name may have been given to the noble family of Mansfield who came over with William the Conqueror; other sources suggest that the name came from Manson, an Anglo-Saxon word for traffic and a field meaning a place of trade; while others claim the town is named after the river Maun, which runs through Mansfield.

== History ==
=== Roman to Medieval period ===
Settlement dates to Roman Britain times between AD 43 to AD 410. Hayman Rooke in 1787 discovered two Roman villas between Mansfield Woodhouse and Pleasley; a cache of denarii (300-400 Roman Silver Coins were found near King's Mill in 1849). A Roman tessellated pavement was found in one of the villas near Mansfield Woodhouse.

In AD 868, the Danes came into the county and they had complete control over the county by AD 877. Their occupation left names on the town, such as Skerry Hill, Ratcliffe Gate and Carr Bank.

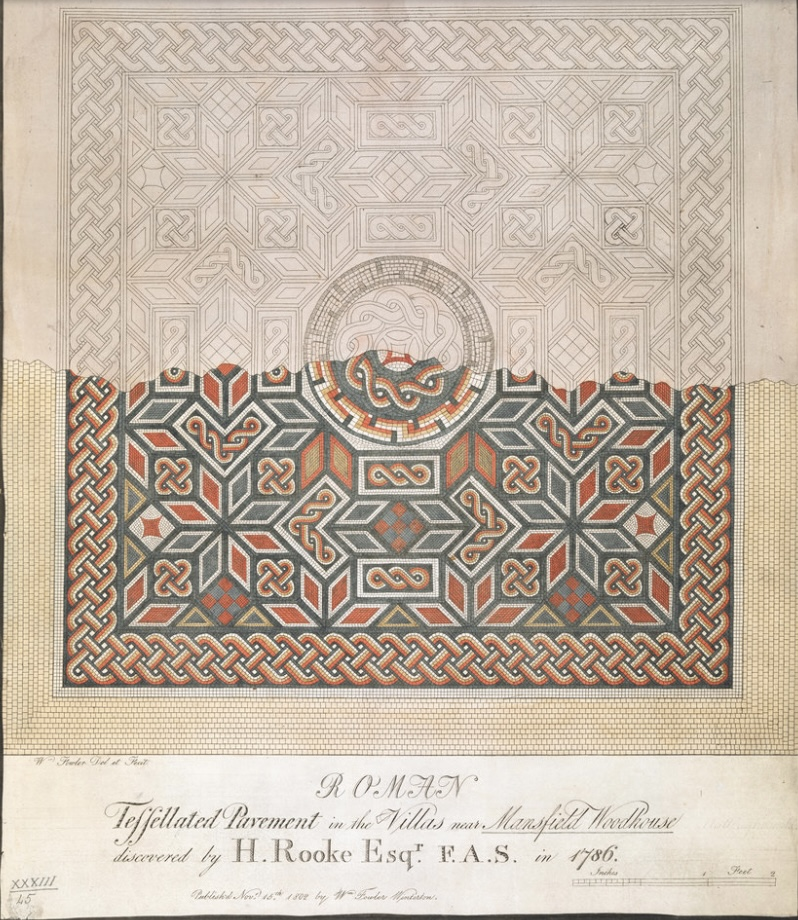
Roman tessellated pavement found in Mansfield Woodhouse

The Royal Manor of Mansfield was held by the King. In 1042, Edward the Confessor possessed a manor in Mansfield. During the Norman Conquest in 1066, William the Conqueror made Sherwood Forest a royal forest for hunting.

The town was recorded as being Mammesfeld in the Wapentake of Broxtowe and the land of William the Conqueror in the Domesday Book of 1086. William owned "two carucates, five sochmans and thirty-five villains; twenty borders, with nineteen carucates and a half in demesne, a mill, piscary, twenty-four acres of meadow and pasture" in Mansfield.

In the time of Henry II of England, the King visited what is now known as Kings Mill, staying at the home of Sir John Cockle for a night having been hunting in Sherwood Forest; Cockle was later known as the Miller of Mansfield. In 1199, the Manor was owned by King John; he used to visit Mansfield frequently between 1200 and 1216, and built a residence here. Later, Edward I held a royal council in the town. The manor, then owned by Henry III, subsequently passed to Henry de Hastings. In 1329, Queen Isabella, mother of Edward III, was the lady of the manor of Mansfield.

Market-petition documents of 1227 spelt Mansfield Maunnesfeld. Richard II signed a warrant in November 1377 to grant tenants the right to hold a four-day fair each year; the spelling had changed to Mannesfeld. Mansfield, Skegby and Sutton in Ashfield were the land of the king in 1086 as stated in the Domesday Book. There are remains of the 12th-century King John's Palace in Kings Clipstone, between Mansfield and Edwinstowe, and it was an area of retreat for royal families and dignitaries through to the 15th century. It was here that William the Lion of Scotland met Richard I of England (Richard the Lionheart) to congratulate him on his return from the crusades. It was also where Queen Eleanor, the first wife of Edward I, was taken ill and moved to Harby. King John and Edward I are reputed to have had impromptu parliaments at the Parliament Oak, near Market Warsop.

St Peter and St Paul's Church is mentioned in the 1086 Doomsday Book and, in 1092, it was passed by William II to Robert Bloet the bishop of Lincoln and Lord Chancellor of England.

Access to the town was by road from the city of Nottingham, on the way to Sheffield. In the town centre, a commemorative plaque was erected in 1988, together with a nearby tree to mark the point thought once to be the centre of Sherwood Forest. The plaque was refurbished in 2005 and moved to a ground plinth.

=== Tudor and Stuart periods ===
In 1516, during the reign of Henry VIII, an act of parliament settled the manor to Thomas Howard, 3rd Duke of Norfolk.

Dame Cecily Flogan in 1521, gave extensive land to the parish church and community in Mansfield in her will. The church, at the time, was in the hands of Edward VI.

Travellers in the 16th and 17th centuries had several inns and stable yards, dating from the medieval period, to stop at: the Harte; the Swan, which survives and has a 1490 dating stone; the Talbot; the White Bear; the Ram, with timber from before 1500; and the White Lion.

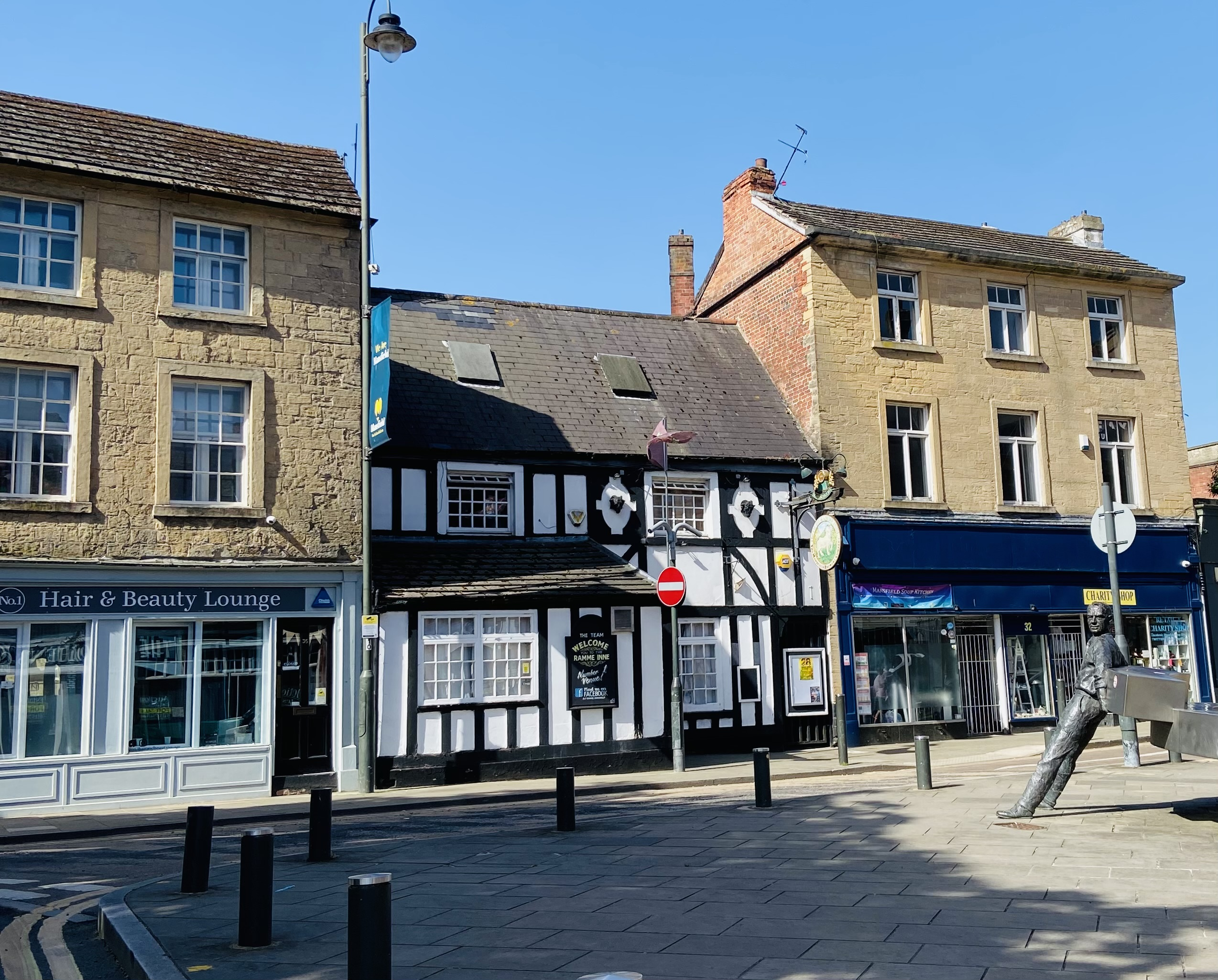
The Old Ram Inn, parts of which date back to the 15th century

Several timber-framed cruck buildings were demolished in 1929; in 1973, a local historical society documented another during demolition dated to 1400 or earlier. Other Tudor houses in Stockwell Gate, Bridge Street and Lime Tree Place were also demolished to make way for development before they could be viewed for listing. Most remaining buildings are from the 17th century. The Swan was rebuilt in 1584 and became a coaching inn in the 1820s/30s.

The manor was passed to George Talbot, 6th Earl of Shrewsbury the husband of Bess of Hardwick, Countess of Shrewsbury in 1589, who then passed it to Gilbert Talbot, 7th Earl of Shrewsbury (the 6th Earl's son) until his death in 1616. Bess's daughter Mary Talbot, Countess of Shrewsbury the wife of Gilbert Talbot became the owner. Finally, the Manor was passed to the Dukes of Newcastle and Portland.

Mansfield and surrounding areas in Nottinghamshire became a strong centre for Nonconformism, separating from the Church of England.

In 1647, George Fox, who was originally from Fenny Drayton in Leicestershire, lived in Mansfield and worked as a shoemaker for four years. George lived in a cottage at the site of St Phillip Neri Catholic Church and ground on Chesterfield Road. It was at this time that he started his ministry. George Fox was imprisoned in Nottingham in 1649, for interrupting the service at the church in Mansfield Woodhouse. He became the founder of the Religious Society of Friends, better known as Quakers. Mansfield became the birthplace of the Quaker religion after Fox had a revelation walking past St Peter and St Paul's Church; he felt compelled to preach to others. The revelation is mentioned in his journal to which he states "and as I was walking by the steeplehouse side, in the town of Mansfield the Lord said unto me, that which people do trample upon must be thy food. And as the Lord spoke he opened it to me how that people and professors did trample upon the life, even the life of Christ was trampled upon…" (Note: The 'steeplhouses' meaning the church of St Peter and St Pauls Church.) This was during the time of the English Civil War.

There is a Quaker Heritage Trail in the town; the former meeting house was on the current site of the bus station. Fox met Elizabeth Hooton at her home Quaker House in nearby Skegby; she is usually considered to be the first person to accept the doctrines of Quakerism.

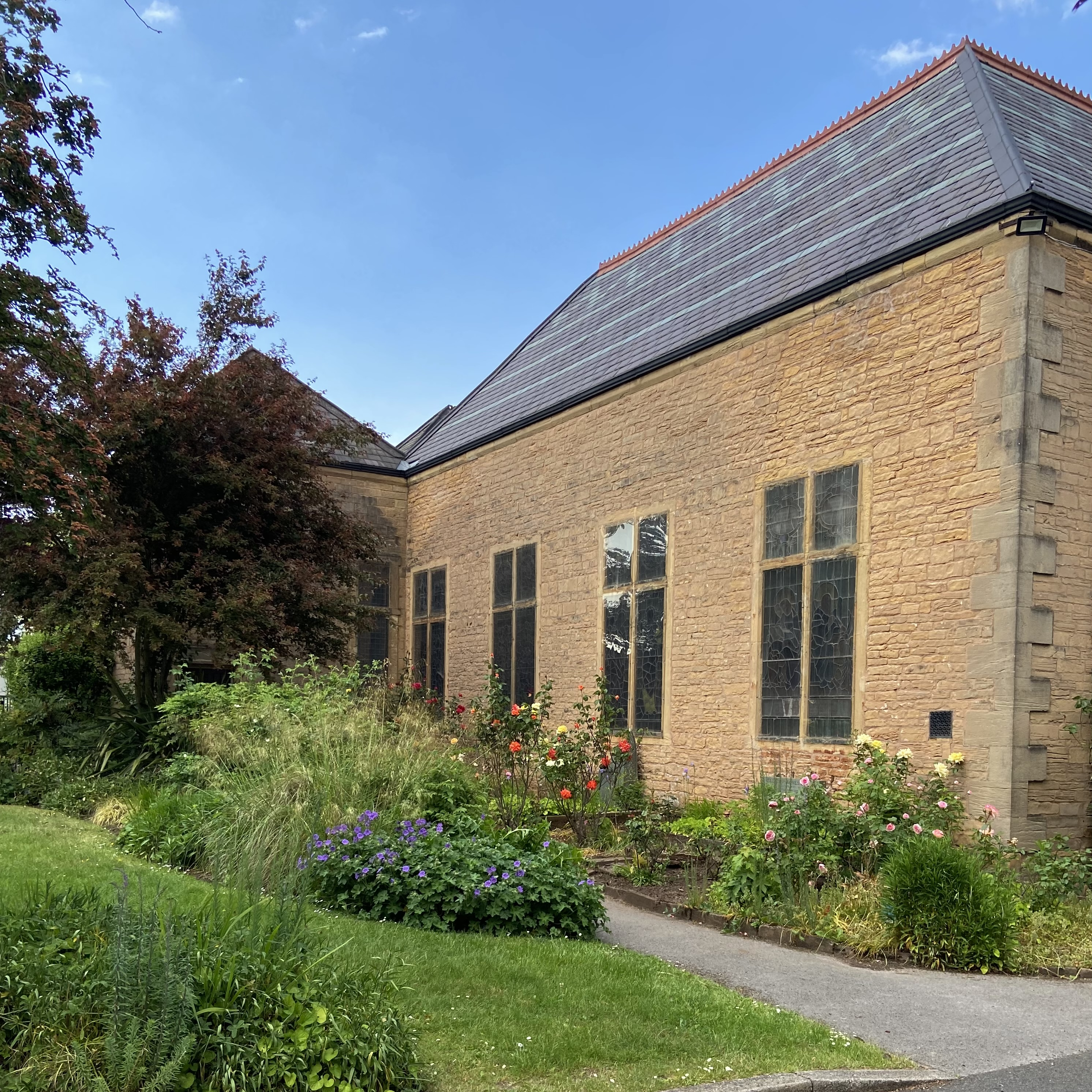
The Old Meeting House, Meeting House Yard; built in 1702

The Old Meeting House (Unitarian church), on Stockwell Gate, was built in 1702 and is the oldest nonconformist place of worship in Nottinghamshire. The history of the church is traced back to 1666. During the persecution of Presbyterian ministers, at the time of the Nonconformists Act 1665, eight ministers sought refuge in Mansfield under the protection of Reverend John Firth.

In 1690, during the reign of William III and Queen Mary, Daniel Clay was put in the pillory in Mansfield for disloyalty, for speaking these words: "God dam King William and Queen Mary and yt King James both should and would come again."

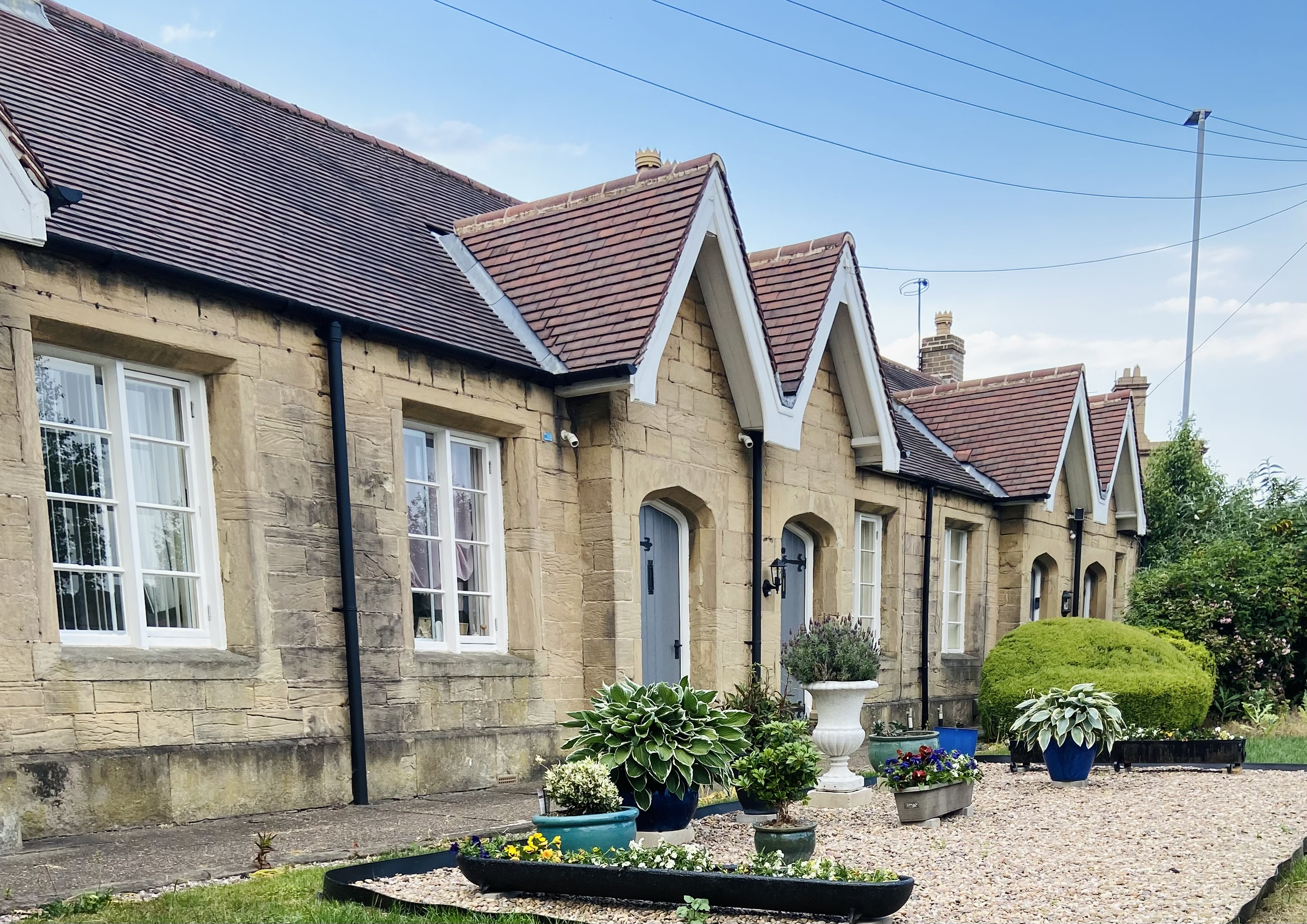
The Almshouses, on Nottingham Road, were founded in 1691 and rebuilt in 1855

Elizabeth Heath founded the almshouses for the poor in 1691. Six were to house Quakers and six members of the established church.

=== 18th century ===
In 1709, Samuel Brunt left £436.15 to the relief of the poor inhabitants of Mansfield. Faith Clerkson in 1725 and Charles Thompson in 1784 both donated money to educating children in Mansfield; this formulated the beginning of the Brunt's Charity.

Robert Dodsley, who wrote The King and the Miller of Mansfield, was a stocking weaver in the town; his writings were also set in the town. He became one of the foremost publishers of that day, publishing Dr Samuel Johnson's London in 1738. Later, he suggested and helped finance Johnson's Dictionary of the English Language.

In 1750, George Whitefield, one of the founders of Methodism, came to preach in the town. The Moot Hall, in the Mansfield Market Place, was erected in 1752 by Henrietta Harley, Countess of Oxford and Countess Mortimer.

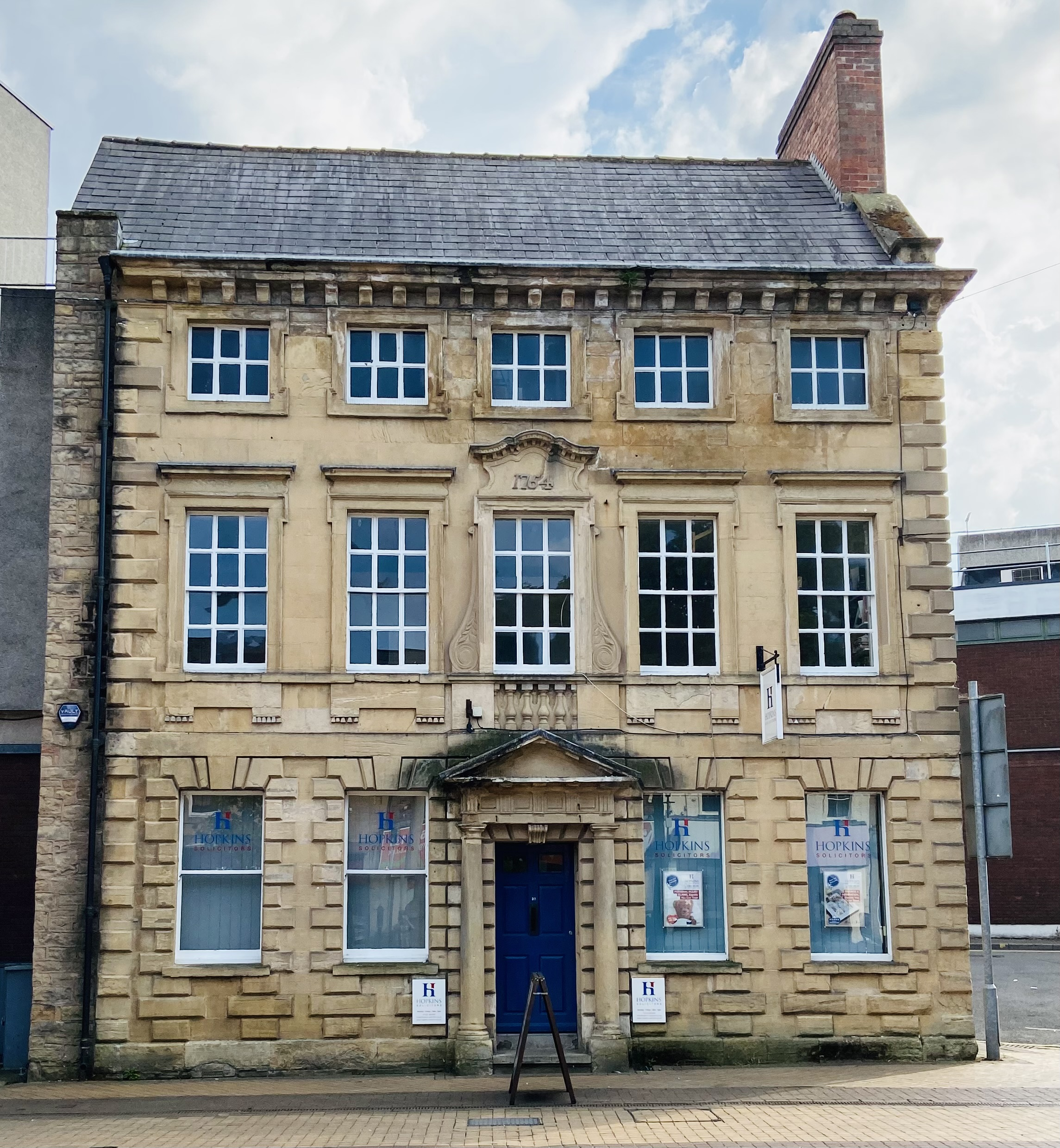
Waverley House, a grade II* listed building, dating from 1754

The Earldom of Mansfield, in Nottingham, was created in 1776 for the Scottish lawyer William Murray, who became the first Earl of Mansfield; he later became the Lord Chief Justice of the King's Bench. William Murray presided over the Somerset vs. Stewart case in 1772, which lead to the abolition of slavery on British soil. Lord Mansfield was a family connection of Jane Austen's family; it is believed this led to the novel Mansfield Park.

It was recorded that the Mansfield workhouse was originally based on Nottingham Road in 1777, housing 56 inmates. It later moved to Stockwell Gate, where the workhouse was designed to house 300 people under the Mansfield poor law.

In 1790, John Throsby described Mansfield as "a flourishing and genteel market town, general well built...and is certainly an ancient place, and some think of high antiquity."

=== 19th century ===
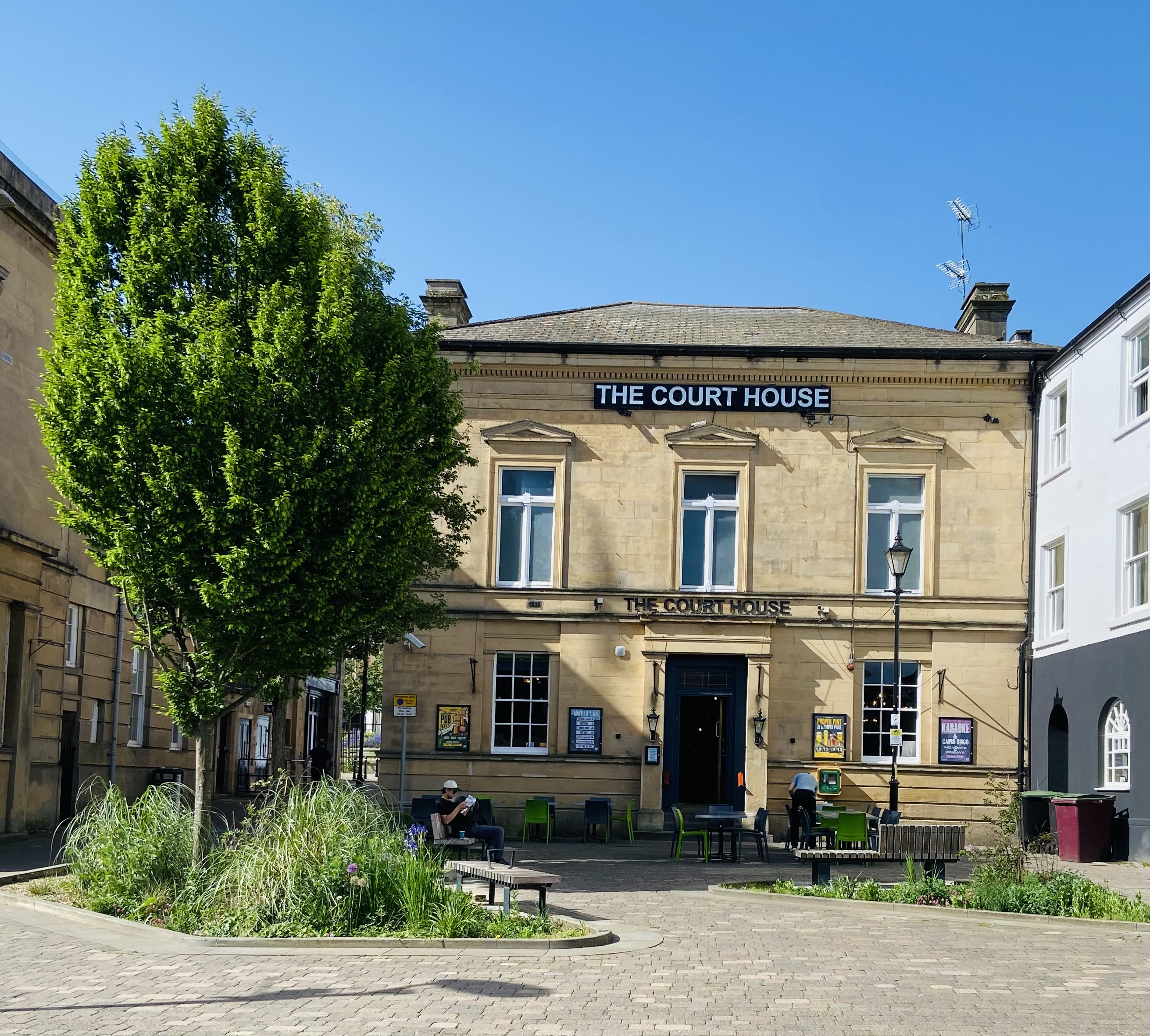
The former County Court built in 1867, now a public house

In 1851, Lord George Bentinck was commemorated in the Cavendish Monument (Bentinck Memorial) in the Market Place, paid for by public subscription. The monument has a square base and three steps, and the style is Gothic revival. It was originally intended to include a figure of Lord George, but there were insufficient funds.

In 1894, William Horner Groves described Mansfield as "one of the quaintest and most healthy of the towns in the Midland counties, is the market town for an agricultural district of eight miles around it. It is the capital of the Broxtowe Hundred of Nottinghamshire and gives its name to a Parliamentary Division of the county."

=== 20th century ===
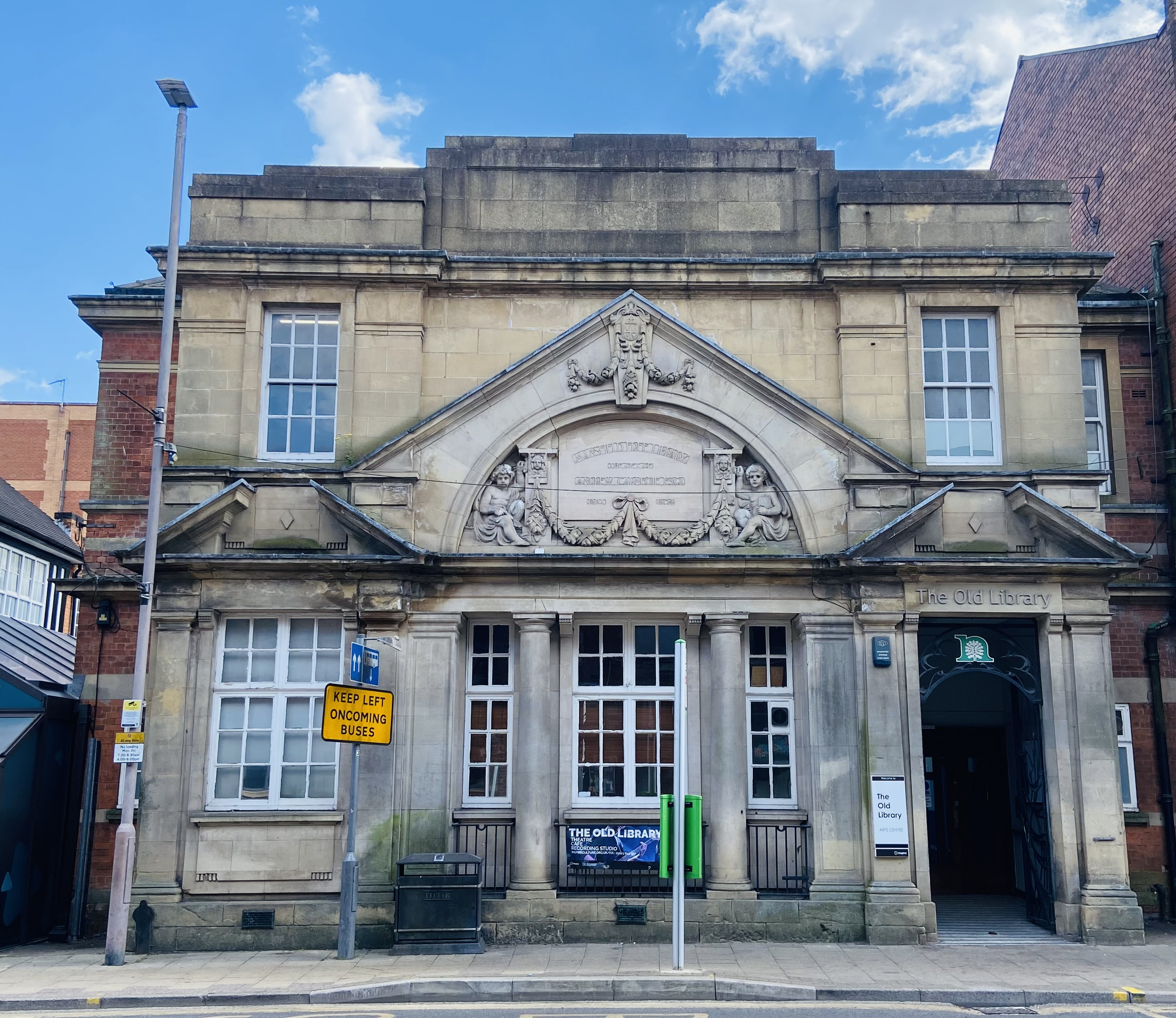
Carnegie Old Library; now an arts centre

The Carnegie Old Library on Leeming Street was funded and erected in 1905 by the industrialist and philanthropist, Andrew Carnegie. 1905 was also the year that the Mansfield and District Light Railways tram system was opened; it closed in 1932.

Queen Elizabeth II and her husband Prince Philip visited Mansfield in 1977, to mark her Silver Jubilee.

=== Ancient markets ===
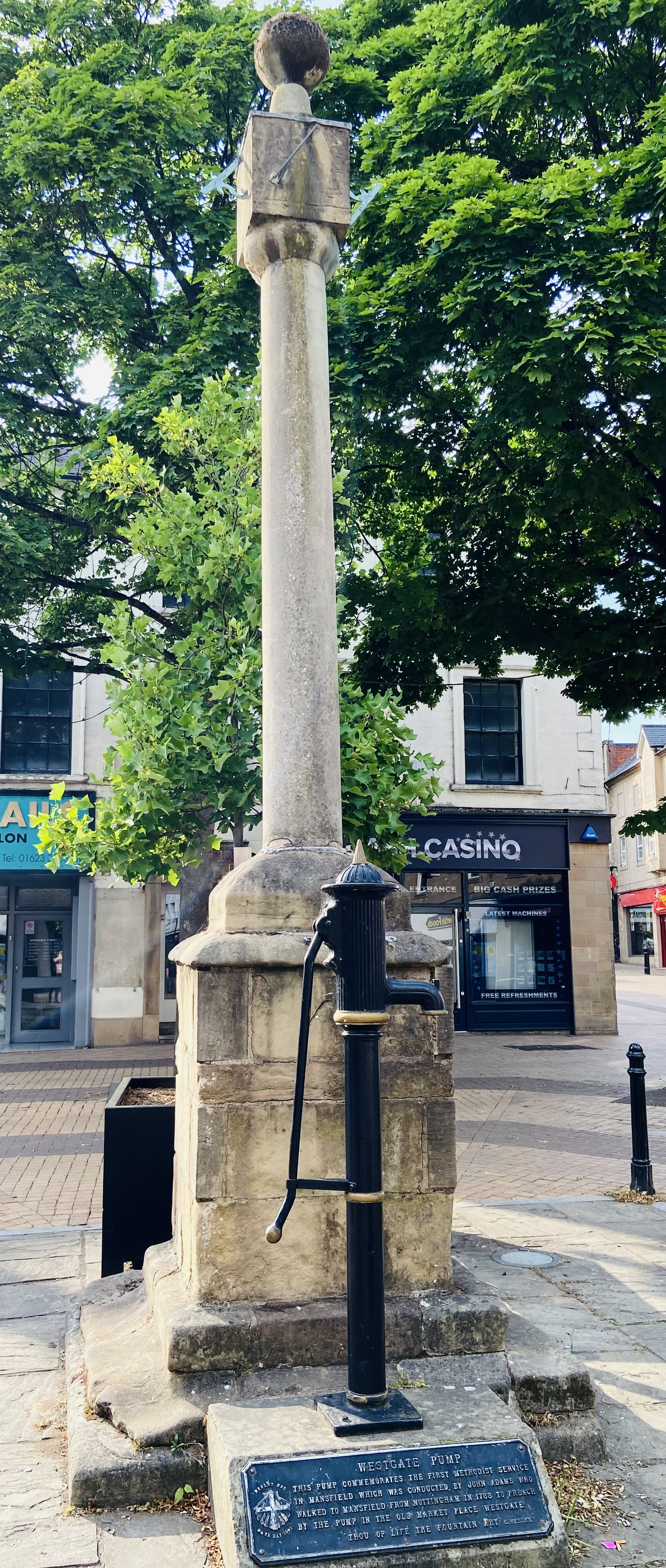
Buttercross, West Gate

Mansfield is a market town with a 700-year-old tradition; a royal charter was issued in 1227. The present market square was created after demolition under the Mansfield Improvement Act 1823(4 Geo. 4. c. xcii). In the centre is the Bentinck Memorial, built in 1849, which commemorates Lord George Bentinck (1802–1848), son of the William Bentinck, 4th Duke of Portland, a local landowner.

The nearby Buttercross in West Gate, in the old cattle market, is of local sandstone dating from the 16th century. Mansfield District Council closed this section in 2015, removing the stalls. Adjacent is Mansfield Library, opened officially by Queen Elizabeth II in 1977 and refurbished in 2012. A replica water pump, placed in 1989, commemorates John Adams bringing the first Methodist service to Mansfield in 1788.

=== Railways ===
The town was originally the terminus of the Mansfield and Pinxton Railway, a horse-drawn plateway built in 1819 and one of the first acquisitions of the newly formed Midland Railway. The Midland used the final section to extend its new Leen Valley line to the present station in 1849.

The Midland Railway extended its Rolleston Junction–Mansfield line to Mansfield in 1871. It continued the line north to Worksop in 1875, opened a link from Mansfield Woodhouse to Westhouses and Blackwell in 1886, and then completed another link from Pleasley through Bolsover to Barrow Hill in 1890. Their 1875-completed viaduct across Mansfield town centre is a grade II listed structure.

The locally promoted Mansfield Railway, between Kirkby South Junction and Clipstone Junction, broke the Midland Railway monopoly; it was opened in stages between 1913 and 1916 for goods trains and, in 1917, for Nottingham Victoria–Ollerton passenger trains, calling at Mansfield. Though nominally independent, the Mansfield Railway connected at both ends with the Great Central Railway, which worked the trains. The town had two stations: Mansfield Town, the former Midland station on Station Road, and Mansfield Central, on Great Central Road, near Ratcliffe Gate. Mansfield & District Light Railways ran a tram service between 1905 and 1932.

Mansfield Central lost its scheduled passenger services at the beginning of 1956 and Mansfield Town closed to passengers in 1964, leaving the town without a passenger railway service until 1995. During this period, Mansfield was, by some definitions, the largest town in Britain without a railway station. The closest station was Alfreton; between 1973 and 1995, it was named Alfreton and Mansfield Parkway to encourage use as a railhead for Mansfield.

== Geography ==
Mansfield has an average elevation of 117 metres (128 yd), with elements elevated at 190 metres (210 yd). The town lies on the river Maun.

The town is 12 miles (19 km) from Chesterfield, 15 miles (24 km) from Nottingham, 23 miles (37 km) from Derby and 30 miles (48 km) from Sheffield.

=== Climate ===
Mansfield has a temperate oceanic climate (Köppen: Cfb), with a narrow temperature range, an even spread of rainfall, low levels of sunshine and often breezy conditions throughout the year. The closest weather-station records for Mansfield come from Warsop in Meden Vale, 7 miles (11 km) to the north.

The absolute maximum temperature record for the area stands at 34.6 °C (94.3 °F), recorded in August 1990. In a typical year, the warmest day should reach 28.9 °C (84.0 °F) and 12.72 days should reach 25.1 °C (77.2 °F) or higher.

The absolute minimum temperature record for the area is −19.1 °C (−2.4 °F), recorded in January 1987. There is air frost on an average of 59 nights a year.

Rainfall averages 634 mm (25 in) a year, with 113 days reporting in excess of 1 mm (0.04 in) of rain (observation period 1971–2000).

The weather station is based at Warsop, 7 miles (11.3 km) from Mansfield town centre.

Climate data for Warsop, (Note: The weather station is located 7 miles (11 km) from Mansfield town centre.) elevation: 46 m (151 ft), 1971–2000 normals, extremes 1960–2006
Month	Jan	Feb	Mar	Apr	May	Jun	Jul	Aug	Sep	Oct	Nov	Dec	Year
Record high °C (°F)	14.4 (57.9)	17.7 (63.9)	22.2 (72.0)	25.3 (77.5)	27.0 (80.6)	31.6 (88.9)	32.5 (90.5)	34.6 (94.3)	27.9 (82.2)	23.9 (75.0)	18.0 (64.4)	15.0 (59.0)	34.6 (94.3)
Mean daily maximum °C (°F)	7.2 (45.0)	7.1 (44.8)	10.0 (50.0)	12.4 (54.3)	16.2 (61.2)	19.1 (66.4)	21.8 (71.2)	21.3 (70.3)	18.0 (64.4)	13.8 (56.8)	9.4 (48.9)	7.9 (46.2)	13.7 (56.7)
Daily mean °C (°F)	3.8 (38.8)	3.9 (39.0)	6.1 (43.0)	7.8 (46.0)	10.9 (51.6)	13.8 (56.8)	16.1 (61.0)	15.7 (60.3)	13.2 (55.8)	9.8 (49.6)	6.1 (43.0)	4.6 (40.3)	9.3 (48.7)
Mean daily minimum °C (°F)	0.4 (32.7)	0.6 (33.1)	2.2 (36.0)	3.2 (37.8)	5.6 (42.1)	8.4 (47.1)	10.4 (50.7)	10.1 (50.2)	8.4 (47.1)	5.8 (42.4)	2.8 (37.0)	1.3 (34.3)	4.9 (40.8)
Record low °C (°F)	−19.1 (−2.4)	−15.6 (3.9)	−13.9 (7.0)	−6.7 (19.9)	−3.9 (25.0)	−1.7 (28.9)	1.4 (34.5)	−0.1 (31.8)	−3.2 (26.2)	−6.6 (20.1)	−8.4 (16.9)	−15.2 (4.6)	−19.1 (−2.4)
Average precipitation mm (inches)	56.2 (2.21)	42.5 (1.67)	48.6 (1.91)	53.3 (2.10)	48.6 (1.91)	60.8 (2.39)	43.9 (1.73)	48.6 (1.91)	54.1 (2.13)	56.2 (2.21)	51.8 (2.04)	63.1 (2.48)	633.9 (24.96)
Average precipitation days (≥ 1.0 mm)	10.7	8.7	10.6	9.4	8.7	9.2	7.2	8.3	8.2	9.8	10.0	11.5	113.0
Source: KNMI

== Governance ==
Steve Yemm MP

The town lies within the Mansfield constituency, which also includes neighbouring Warsop. From the 2024 election, the MP is Steve Yemm of the Labour Party.

The role of Mayor of Mansfield is an elected position; since 2019, it has been held by Andy Abrahams.

In April 2017, Sophie Whitby was elected to the Mansfield district as a Member of Youth Parliament, on a manifesto that included promoting equality for the LGBT community.

== Economy ==
The areas of Mansfield and Ashfield had a combined Gross Value Added (GVA) in 2023 of £5 billion. In 2023, Mansfield's tourism economy equated to £130.76 million, up from £124.75 million in 2022.

=== Town centre ===
Mansfield has a large market place within its commercial and retail centre; until 2016, there was also market trading at the old Buttercross Market. Among Mansfield's retail outlets is the Four Seasons shopping centre created in 1973–76, with over 50 units occupied by national chains and phone shops. There are other national chains on Stockwell Gate/West Gate, including Marks and Spencer.

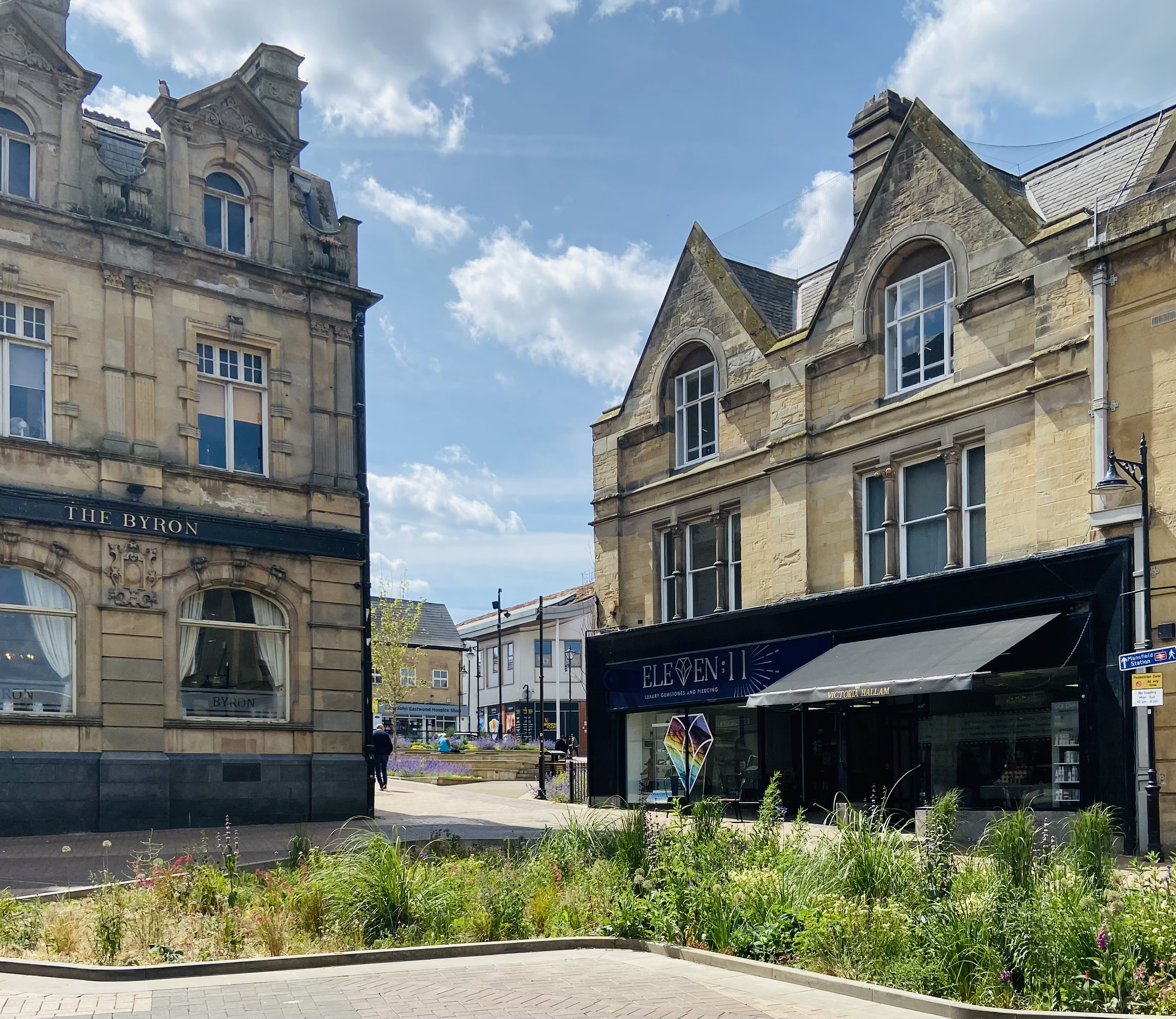
Queens Walk

Close to the market place is Leeming Street, which houses the Mansfield Museum, Palace Theatre, restaurants, public houses, bars and nightclubs.

There are also three outdoor retail parks, two with adjacent branded food outlets. Since 2010, there has been a town centre business improvement district (BID), financed by 2% extra on the rateable value of nearby businesses. The BID aims to improve growth, investment and success for businesses.

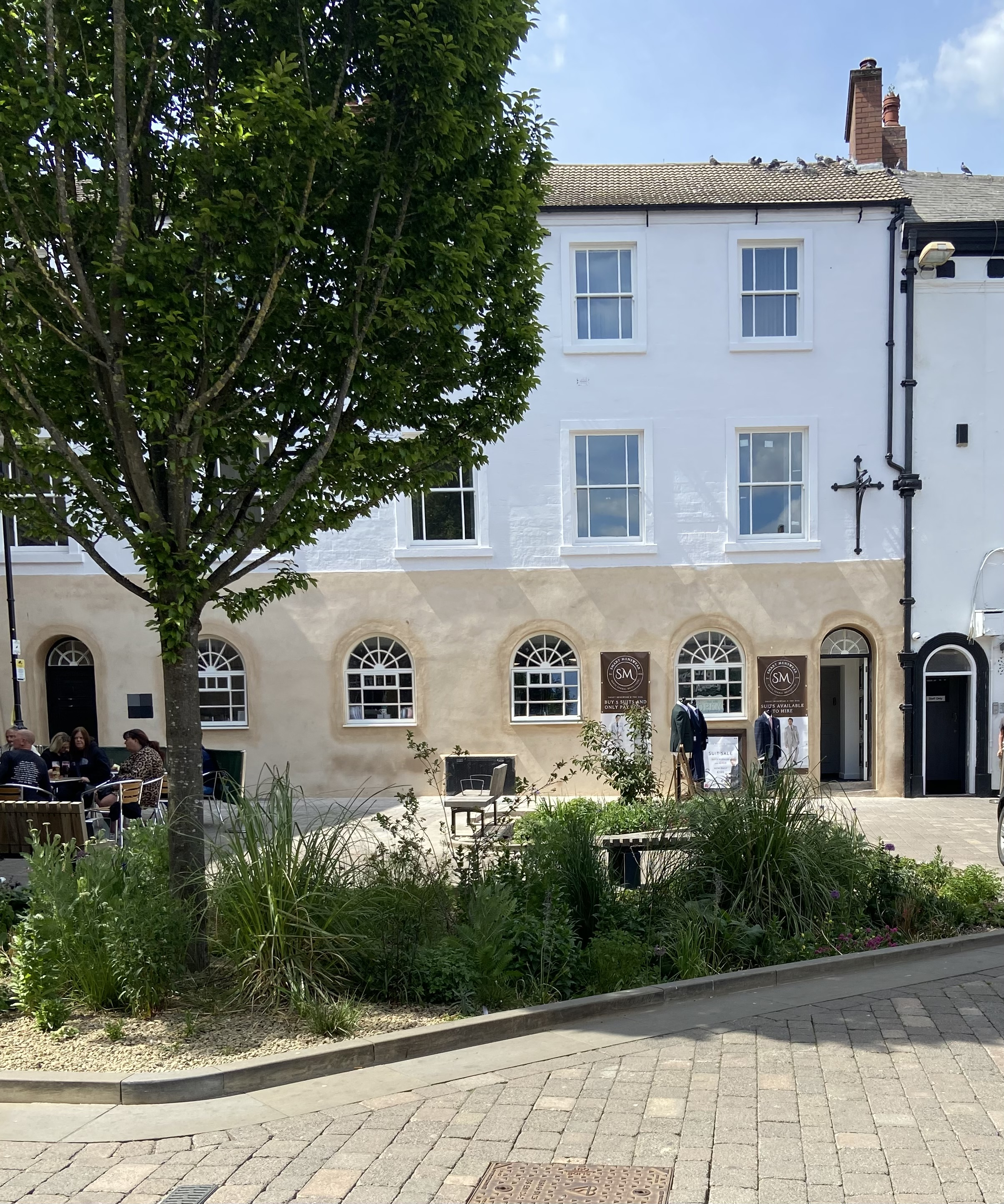
The former Dial public house behind Market Place planting

Other aims of the BID include improving shop frontages, signage, and cleaning operations. The bid also installed a crowd-funded town centre wi-fi internet installation costing £37,000 and arranges for events such as artisan and Christmas markets and the Armed Forces Day.

=== Urban regeneration ===
Mansfield is going through a period of urban regeneration, with new homes being built for a growing demand. Data collated by the Office for National Statistics in 2020 advised that more people are moving from London to Mansfield than any other part of Nottinghamshire.

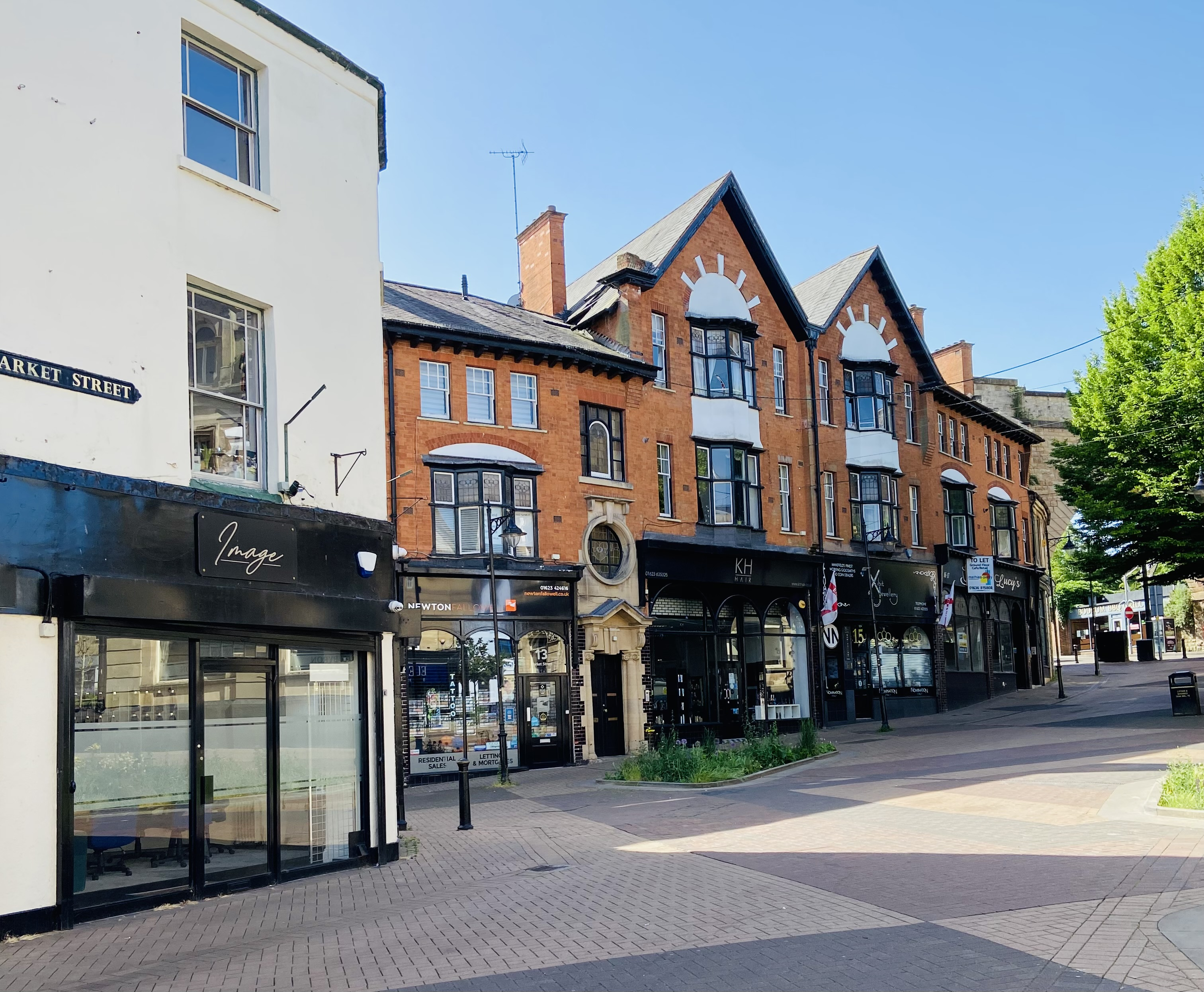
Market Street

Mansfield District Council received £25 million from the UK government's Levelling Up Fund in 2023 for the Mansfield Connect project, which aims to regenerate the former Co-operative department store (taken over by Beales in 2011) into a multi-agency and community hub for the NHS, the Department of Work and Pensions, Nottinghamshire County Council, Vision West Nottinghamshire College and Mansfield CVS.

A further £2 million will be spent on revitalising Mansfield's historic market place funded through central government's Community Regeneration Partnership funding. This will include new stone surfacing, improved lighting, new seating, street furniture a new town garden (featuring trees and rain garden) and a new water feature.

In February 2022, Severn Trent Water shared its £76 million 'Green Recovery Project' for flood alleviation investment for the town, including rain garden areas around the market place, a memorial garden at the back of the Old Town Hall and a pocket park on the corner of Walkden Street/Quaker Way. Some of the funding was spent on the memorial garden on Exchange Row, landscaped areas in Mansfield Market Place and Market House Place, as part of the Sustainable Urban Drainage System programme to prevent flooding.

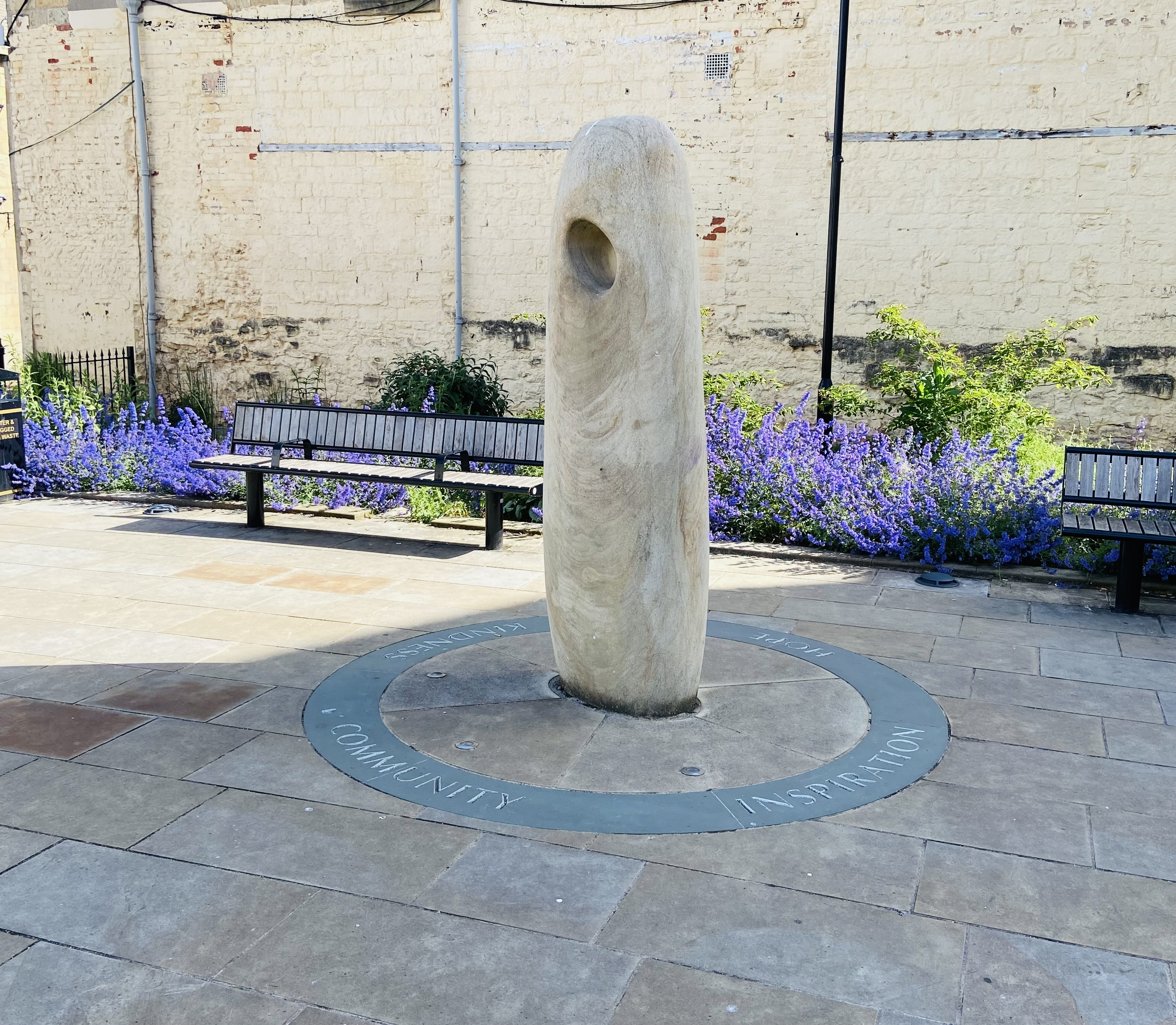
The Memorial Garden, Exchange Row, part of the Green Recovery Project

Also in 2023, the council purchased White Hart Street in the town centre and announced plans for its redevelopment — a mixed-use development of commercial premises and affordable homes was given the green light in 2025, and the scheme is scheduled for completion in 2028. This is part of the Mansfield Town Centre Masterplan.

A significant number of new homes and developments have been built or are planned in Mansfield, including High Oakham Park and the Lindhurst development, which is to include 1,700 homes, a hotel, health centre, primary school, care home and offices.

Rosemary Centre, built as a large weaving shed in 1907 by John Harwood Cash and converted to retail in 1984, was a pedestrianised area off the town centre with a covered streetside parade. In April 2023, a planning application to demolish the Rosemary Centre to build a Lidl supermarket and another retail unit was approved. Demolition of the centre began in January 2026 and was completed by March 2026.

The nearby Walkden Street car park's top floor collapsed in August 2025 and Mansfield District Council decided it should be demolished. This forms part of the town centre Masterplan. Demolition was opposed by Tesco (which the council was contracted to for an additional 49 years) and prolonged litigation ensued. Demolition started in November 2026 with a projected timeframe of 18 weeks.

=== Civic centre ===
The headquarters of the Mansfield District Council at Chesterfield Road South were purpose-built by 1986, bringing together workers from 12 offices across the district. The project took two years and over-ran the anticipated cost by £1 million, totalling £6.7 million, then the council's biggest spending scheme. It was opened in 1987 by Princess Anne. A new war memorial, traditionally located within Carr Bank Park, was completed in 1994.

In-house catering facilities are run by outside contractors. From 2018, the civic centre has office suites allocated to JobCentre Plus, an agency within the Department for Work and Pensions, with their previous town centre location, Hill House, being sold for conversion into residential accommodation.

Mansfield Community Partnership at the civic centre is a centralised hub for law and order, with police, street wardens, housing, domestic abuse and anti social behaviour officers in a dedicated town centre unit.

In 2021, the Labour council proposed a new community hub at the old town hall in the town centre, intending to relocate staff together with other parties having vested interests in the present building and area. By 2023, the council's priorities had changed, having acquired a £20 million grant from central government towards the cost of converting the nearby old Art Deco-styled former Co-operative store, closed since 2020. A similar notion had been mooted in 2009 by Tony Egginton, then Executive Mayor with a ruling majority of Independent Forum councillors, by using a small number of town centre buildings owned by the council including the old Town Hall.

Intended to be named Mansfield Connect, a multi-agency hub is planned with space sub-let to partner organisations such as police, social care and Jobcentre Plus. The council had taken possession in 2024. As of July 2026, contractors Kier had withdrawn having completed the first phase of internal works and demolishing two skybridge walkways linking across a road to the Four Seasons shopping complex. In February 2026, the council initiated a public consultation to ascertain viewpoints on what it had termed as "revised design", prior to submitting a planning application later in the year. On 29 September 2026 the council submitted a planning application to redevelop the site including full demolition of the former department store. Mayor Andy Abrahams confirmed the building could not be saved due to structural deterioration.

==== Regeneration history ====
Reconstruction of King's Mill Hospital, part of which was completed by 2009, is near to the Mansfield and Ashfield Regeneration Route (MARR) which opened in 2004, a bypass route around the town designed to reduce traffic through-flow and improve public access by connecting the A617 at Pleasley to the A617 at Rainworth.

In 2009, Mansfield made an unsuccessful bid for city status, appending redevelopment plans for retail, residential and leisure facilities with road improvements gradually being made.

Several regeneration projects planned for Mansfield involved mass demolition, but the 2008 financial crisis and subsequent central-government funding cuts and escalating austerity measures deferred them. Mansfield District Council promoted two new developments: Arrival Square, opened 2008, an office block occupied by the Probation Service by the rail station; and Queen's Place — completed in late 2013 — which cost the council £2.4 million. It offered two new ground-floor retail units and six offices in Queen Street between the new transport interchange and the market square.

=== The Industrial Revolution ===
Coal mining was the main industry for most of the 20th century; although Mansfield itself does not now show signs of coal mining, a few areas near the town still do. A violent episode in the UK miners' strike (1984–1985) occurred in Mansfield on May Day in 1984. Most of the area's miners had voted against a strike, but the local branch of the National Union of Mineworkers initially maintained that the strike was official to show solidarity with strikers in other areas. When the coal board granted an extra day of leave after the bank holiday, a group of working miners confronted union officials and violence broke out with striking miners. Mansfield later hosted a breakaway union, the Union of Democratic Mineworkers, which recruited many who had opposed the 1984–1985 strike. The Coal Authority is based in Mansfield, and the larger than lifesize statue Tribute to the British Miner by Nikolaos Kotziamanis was erected in 2003 to honour the town's mining heritage.

As demand for coal fell, Mansfield's pits wound down and miners had to find other work. The headstocks close to the village of Clipstone are an important local landmark and said to be the highest in Europe. Community groups are trying to preserve them as a reminder of the area's mining history.

A few streets in and around the town form long rows of terraced houses reminiscent of the affordable housing provided for mine workers in the prime of the industry. Many were demolished in 2012 in Pleasley Hill, Market Warsop and elsewhere; new houses have been built since in this area of Pleasley Hill.

=== Mansfield Brewery ===
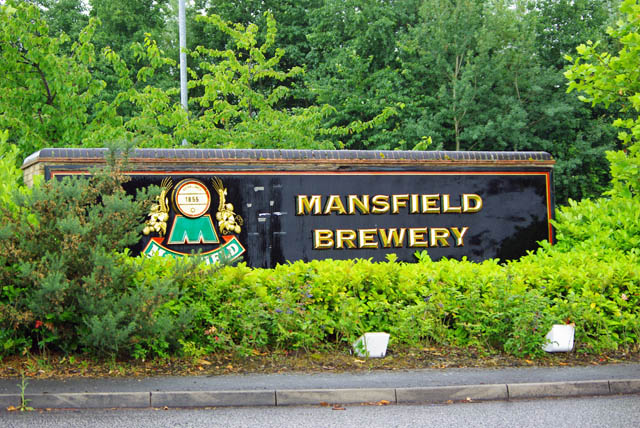
A Mansfield Brewery sign at the entrance to the former distribution depot

Mansfield Brewery was best known for Mansfield Bitter and its advertising slogan "Not much matches Mansfield", which was later used as the title of a play by Kevin Fegan set in the town.

In the 1980s, the brewery ran adverts referencing the achievements of contemporary world figures such as Ronald Reagan with the slogan "but he's never had a pint of Mansfield." The brewery was acquired in 1999 by Wolverhampton & Dudley Breweries, and closed in 2002. Most of the site was redeveloped as housing, while the ornate office building, Chadburn House, is now office space for businesses, including the local newspaper, and a micro brewery with a cafe and bar. The site is now owned by Vision West Nottinghamshire College, a further education college, which uses it to deliver construction courses and training.

Mansfield's old-established soft drink manufacturer, R.L. Jones, with brand names Sunecta and Mandora, was bought by Mansfield Brewery in 1977. A move to a modern factory in Bellamy Road in 1975 released land projected for a high-density housing development, known as Layton Burroughs. Mansfield Brewery sold the business in 1988 for £21.5 million to the Scottish drinks company A.G. Barr plc; at the time, the firm employed 400 people. Production ceased there in January 2011, when A.G. Barr moved production to other sites.

== Education ==
=== Primary schools ===
- Abbey Primary School
- Asquith Primary School
- Berry Hill Primary School
- Crescent Primary School
- Farmilo Primary and Nursery School
- Forest Town Primary School
- Heatherley Primary School
- Heathlands Primary and Nursery School
- High Oakham Primary School
- Holly Primary School
- Intake Farm Primary School
- John T Rice Infants and Nursery School
- King Edward Primary and Nursery School
- Leas Park Junior School
- Mansfield Primary Academy
- Nettleworth Infant and Nursery School
- Newlands Junior School
- Northfield Primary and Nursery School
- Oak Tree Primary School
- Peafield Lane Academy
- St Edmunds Church of England Primary School
- St Patrick's Catholic Primary School
- St Peter's Church of England Primary Academy
- St Phillip Neri and St Bede Catholic Voluntary Academy
- Sutton Road Primary School
- The Bramble Academy
- The Flying High Academy
- Wainwright Academy
- Wynndale Academy.

=== Secondary schools ===
- All Saints' Catholic Academy
- Queen Elizabeth Academy
- Samworth Church Academy
- The Brunts Academy
- The Garibaldi School
- The Manor Academy.

=== Specialist schools ===
- The Beech Academy
- Horizons Academy
- Redgate Primary Academy
- Yeoman Park Academy.

=== College and associated university ===
- Vision West Nottinghamshire College
- Nottingham Trent University.

== Public services ==
=== Health ===
The NHS services which underpin the health services in Mansfield are:

- Sherwood Forest Hospitals NHS Foundation Trust
- Nottinghamshire Healthcare NHS Foundation Trust
- The primary care services are provided by the Nottingham and Nottinghamshire NHS Integrated Care Board.

=== Emergency services ===
The East Midlands Ambulance Service local ambulance station cover is from Sutton Road, Mansfield, close to King's Mill Hospital.

Nottinghamshire Fire and Rescue Service is provided from Mansfield Fire Station, based on Rosemary Street.

Nottinghamshire Police are the territorial police force for the county.

=== Cemeteries and crematorium ===
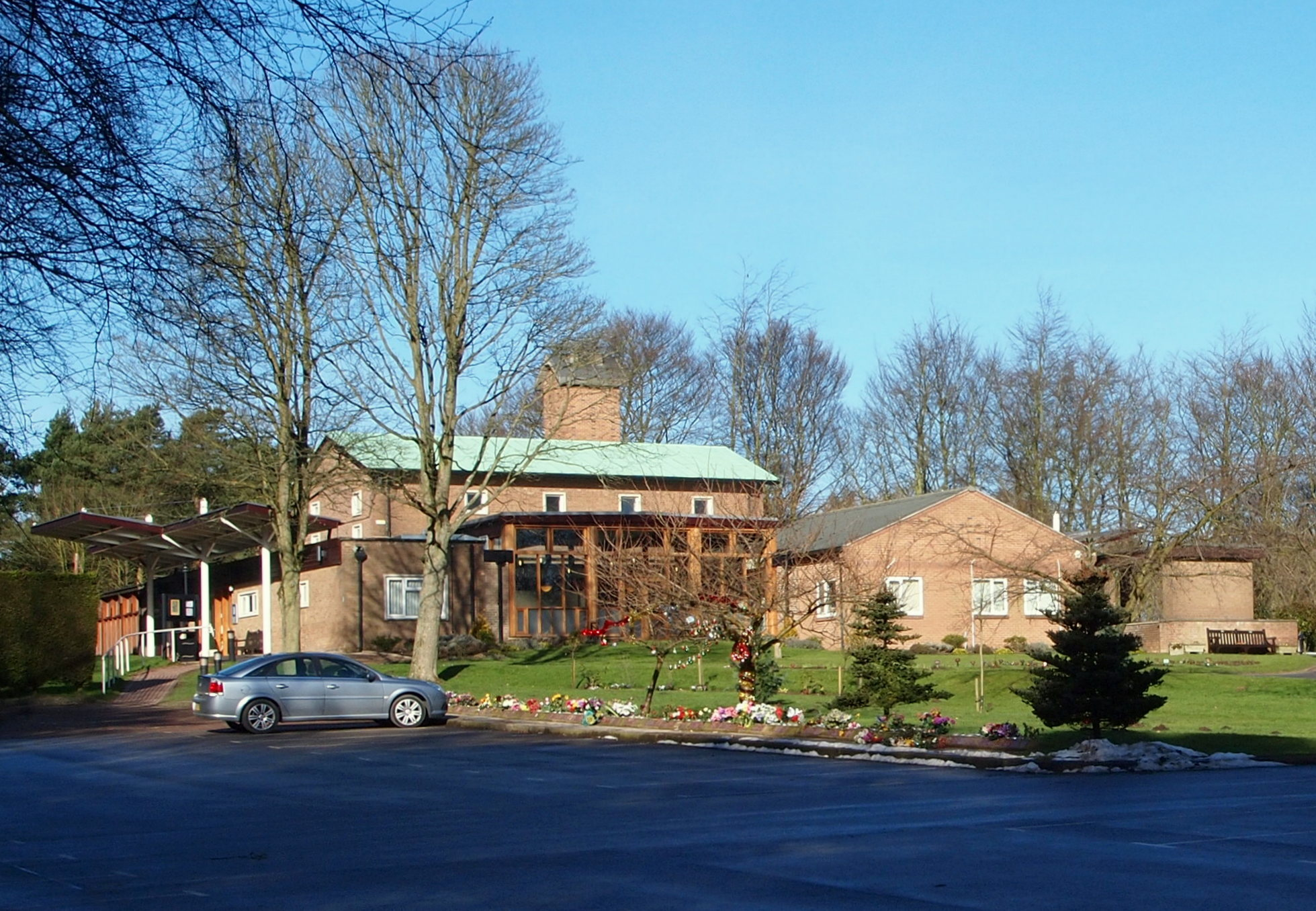
The crematorium

The main cemetery and crematorium occupy a 10 acres (4.0 hectares) site accessed from Derby Road, on the southern edge of town near the boundary with Ashfield; they share a car park, but a separate cemetery facility is accessed from the top of Forest Hill. In late 2015, Mansfield District Council recognised the need for additional spaces and planning consent was obtained. The older part of the cemetery, fronting Nottingham Road and Forest Hill (the old Derby Road) has on-street parking; site access on foot can be hard due to the steep slope.

The cemetery was opened in 1857; due to insufficient church graveyard space, the mid-to-late Victorian population growth and several then-new churches built with little or no dedicated graveyard areas. A ten-acre extension was made in 1898. Registered by the Commonwealth War Graves Commission as 'Nottingham Road Cemetery', it contains the war graves of 51 Commonwealth service personnel of World War I and 45 from World War II.

The adjacent Mansfield and District Crematorium, with two chapels seating 35 and up to 80 was set up in 1960, and is a responsibility shared between Mansfield District Council, Ashfield District Council, and Newark and Sherwood District Council.

There are other cemeteries on the A60 road at Mansfield Woodhouse and Warsop, and off the A617 at Pleasley Hill.

== Transport ==
=== Railway ===
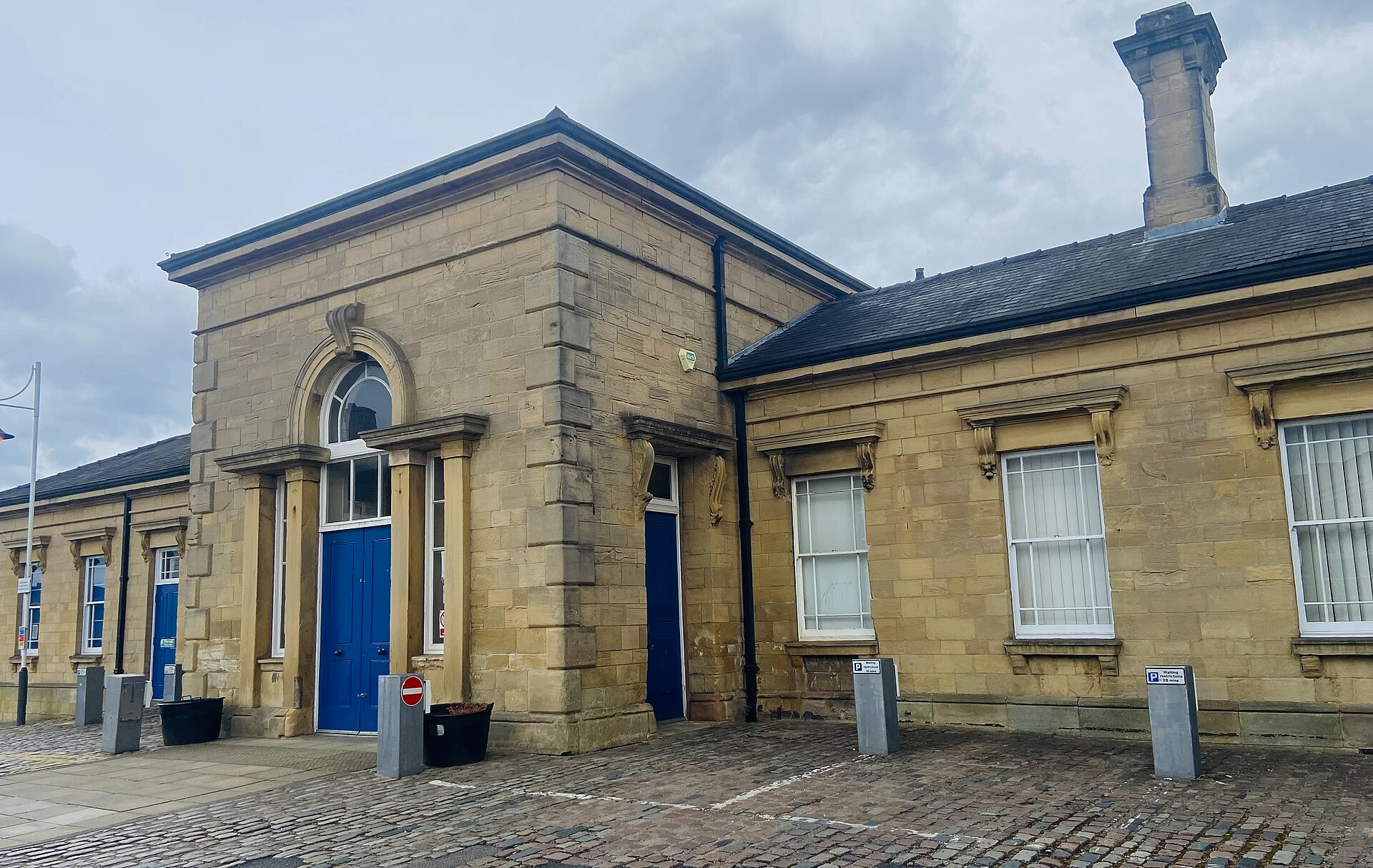
The station building, which is grade II listed

Mansfield lies on the Robin Hood Line, which connects the town with Nottingham and Worksop; the line was reopened in 1995. East Midlands Railway operates generally hourly services in each direction.

=== Roads ===
The M1 motorway lies west of Mansfield. It is 6.8 miles (10.9 km) from junction 29 at Heath, Derbyshire for traffic from the north and Chesterfield, and 7.7 miles (12.4 km) from junction 27 at Annesley for traffic from the south.

The A60 road runs north–south through Mansfield, between Nottingham and Worksop. The A617 road skirts around the town, providing a road link eastwards towards Newark-on-Trent, as well as westwards towards Chesterfield and the M1. The A38 road, the longest two-digit A-road in Great Britain, terminates at Mansfield and provides the town with a direct link to Derby and beyond through the West Midlands and South West England.

=== Buses ===
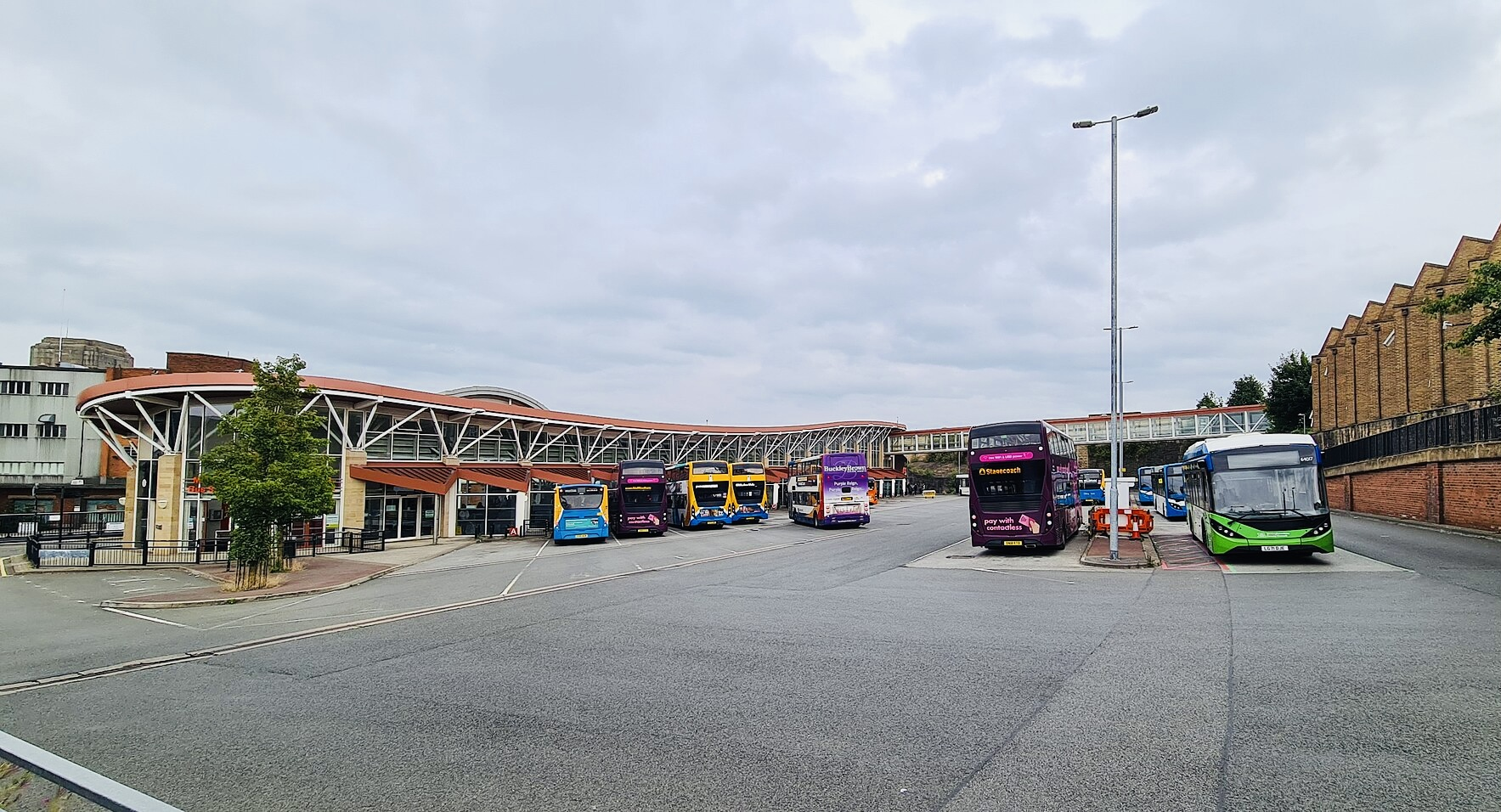
The bus station

Bus services are operated mainly by Stagecoach East Midlands; Trent Barton and National Express also work the area. Routes connect the town with Nottingham, Alfreton, Chesterfield, Rainworth and Worksop. The new Mansfield bus station was opened in 2013, replacing one dating from 1977; it is sited near to the railway station as part of the 'Gateway to Mansfield' scheme.

== Landmarks ==
=== Places of interest ===
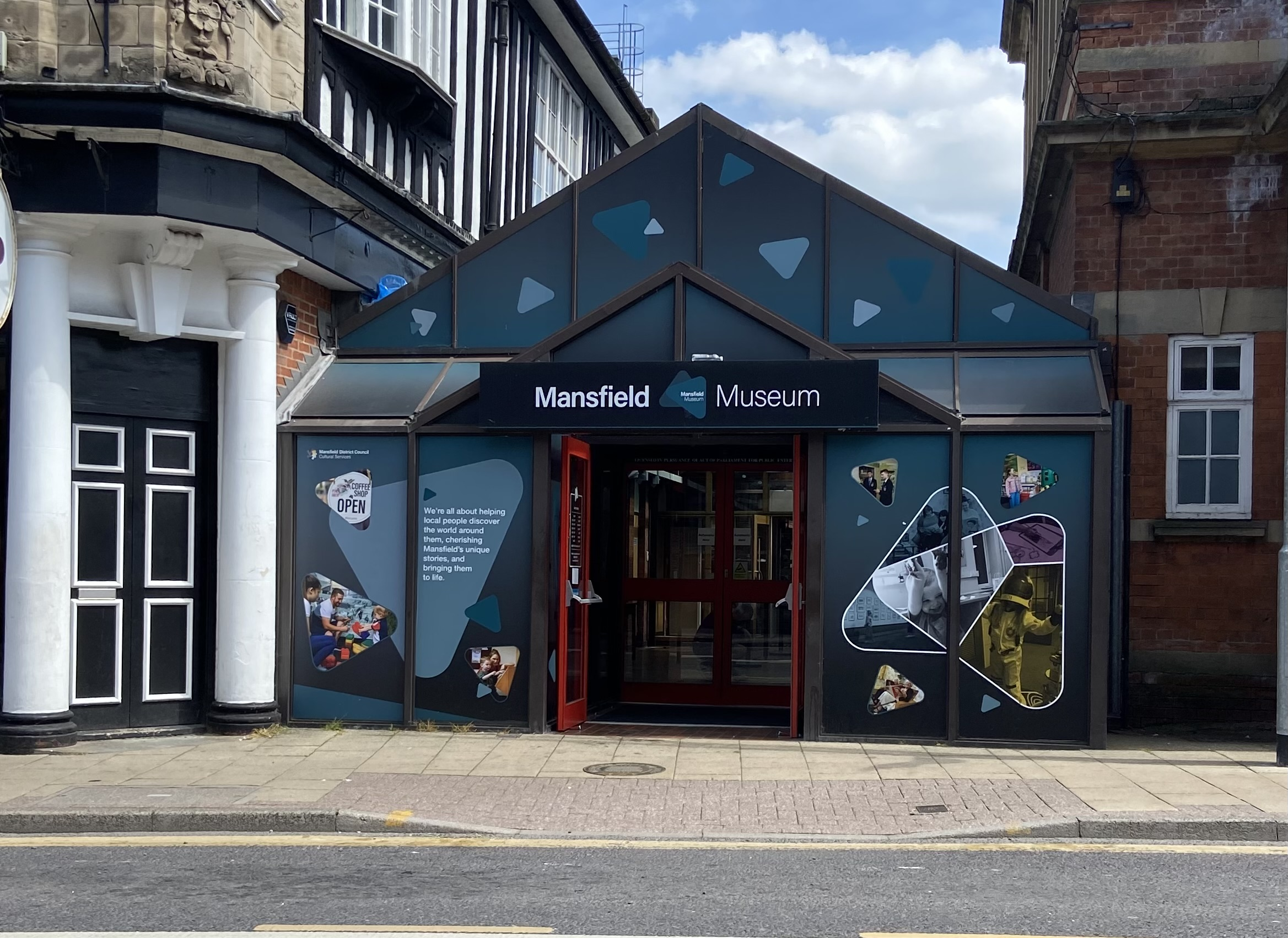
Mansfield Museum

Places of interest in the town and district include:

- Mansfield Museum: opened in 1904 and has been based on its present site since 1938
- The Quaker Heritage Trail: starts from the bus station
- The Mansfield Heritage Trail: starts from the museum.
- St Peter and St Paul's Church: a Grade I listed building that was mentioned in the Doomsday Book
- The railway viaduct: built in 1875 and is grade II listed.
- The Old Meeting House: built in 1702
- Kings Mill Reservoir: constructed in 1839
- Parliament Oak tree: near Mansfield Woodhouse.

=== Parks ===
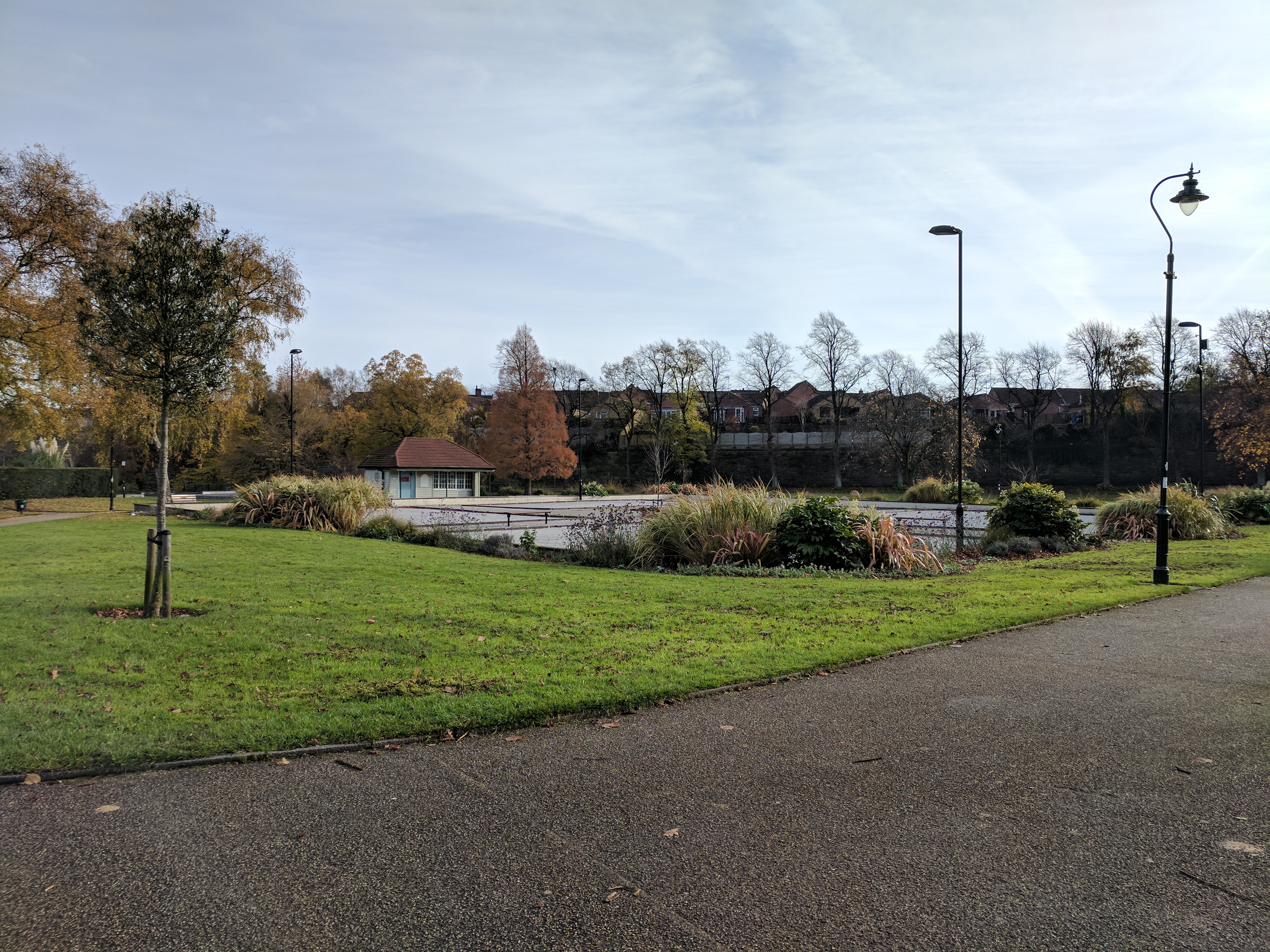
Titchfield Park

Titchfield Park, which on the same site as the Water Meadows swimming complex, offers large grassy areas on both sides of the river Maun, crossed by two footbridges. It has a bowls green, hard tennis courts, a basketball court and a children's play area.

Fisher Lane Park stretches from the top of Littleworth to Rock Hill. It is popular with dog walkers and kite flyers and, since the installation of a concrete skate plaza, with skaters. In the summer, children's rides and stalls are set up in the park.

Carr Bank Park has a rocky grotto, a bandstand and summer flower beds. It has a war memorial built of local sandstone, dedicated to soldiers killed in action since the end of the Second World War, to complement the original setting unveiled after the First World War in 1921.

Berry Hill Park and King George V park are also in the town. Mansfield lies a few miles from Sherwood Forest, a royal forest famous for its links with Robin Hood and the Mercian kings. As Mansfield used to be part of Sherwood Forest a tree existed on Westgate to mark the centre of the forest, although the tree no longer exists today, a plaque mounted on a plinth in West Gate remains where the tree was.

== Religion ==
St Peter and St Paul's Church is a grade I listed building. It is mentioned in the Domesday Book in 1086 and was built mostly by the Normans.

St John's Church, a grade II listed building, was built in 1854 and designed by Henry Isaac Stevens. St Mark's Church was built in 1897; the church building is grade II listed. St Lawrence the Martyr Church on Skerry Hill was built in 1909 and is grade II listed.

St Philip Neri Church is a Roman Catholic church on Chesterfield Road South.

A Quaker Meeting House of the Religious Society of Friends is on Rosemary Street.

== Culture ==
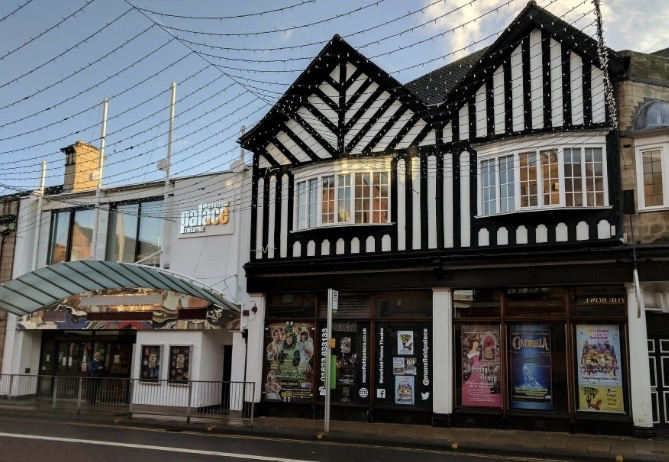
The Palace Theatre, on Leeming St

The Palace Theatre is the town's prime entertainment venue. Built as a cinema in 1910 and originally known as the Palace Electric Theatre, it was adapted into a live theatre with a proscenium arch. It was known as the Civic Hall and Civic Theatre, before the current name was revived in 1995. With a seating capacity of 534, the theatre is a mid-scale touring venue. It presents a programme of professional and amateur productions and a yearly pantomime.

Mansfield Super Bowl, a 28-lane alley with hospitality, opened in 1991. Facing closure in 2014, it was sold and refurbished in 2015.

The old Carnegie library, founded in 1905 in Leeming Street, became an arts and performance centre in 1976. It houses a recording studio, meeting room and the 100-seat Studio Theatre.

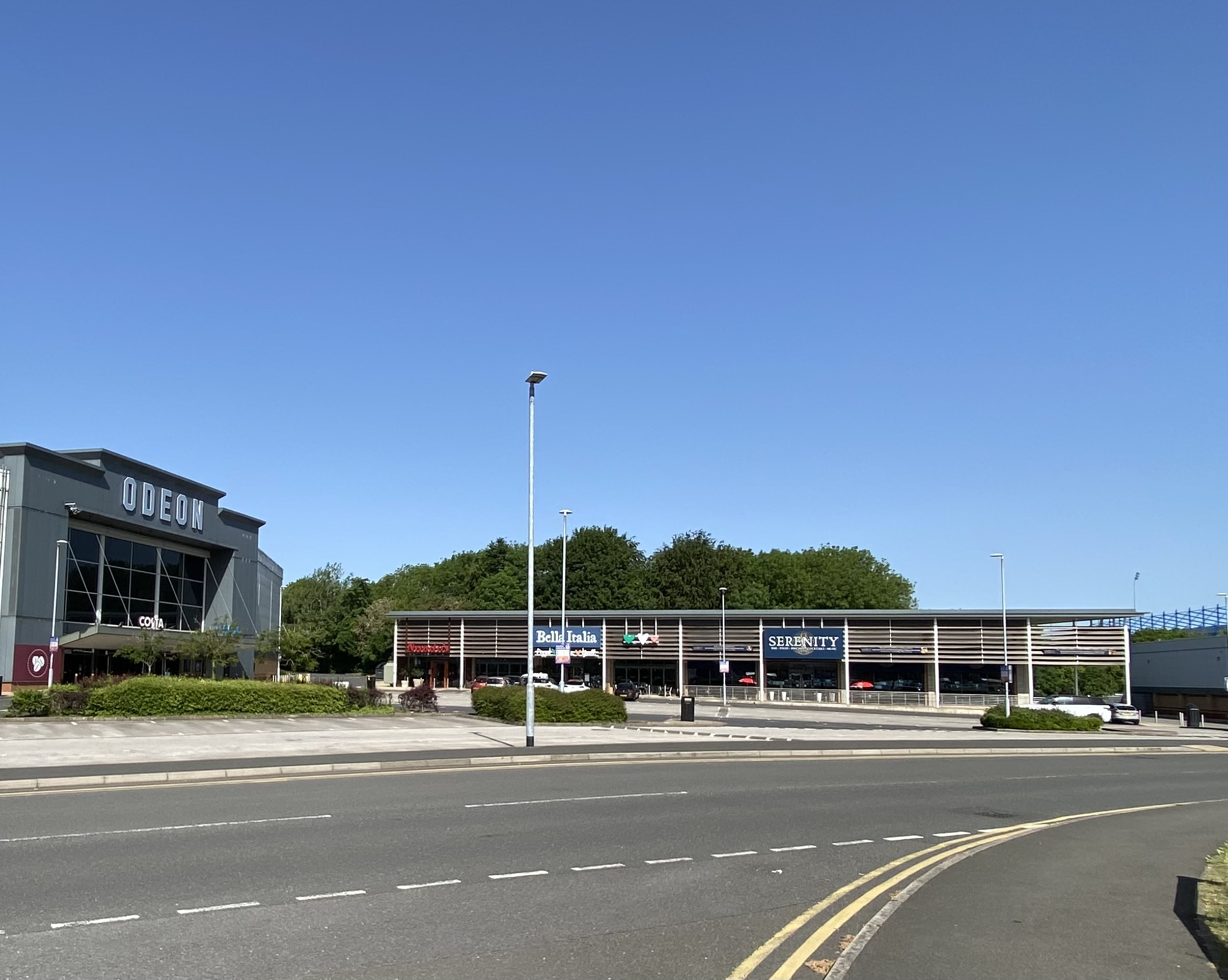
The Odeon cinema

Mansfield also has a large Odeon cinema on a new retail and entertainment park outside the town centre. The previous ABC town centre cinema was used as a snooker centre until closure in 2012; late in 2013 it was converted into a church.

=== Summer in the Streets ===
Every summer, Mansfield District Council hosts a Summer in the Streets festival. This consists of various public events held all across the town over many days, such as children's entertainment, fairground rides in the market square and hands-on workshops for crafts and circus skills.

The Armed Forces Day, takes place every year in June, and provides the community a chance to say thank you to those who serve or have served in the armed forces.

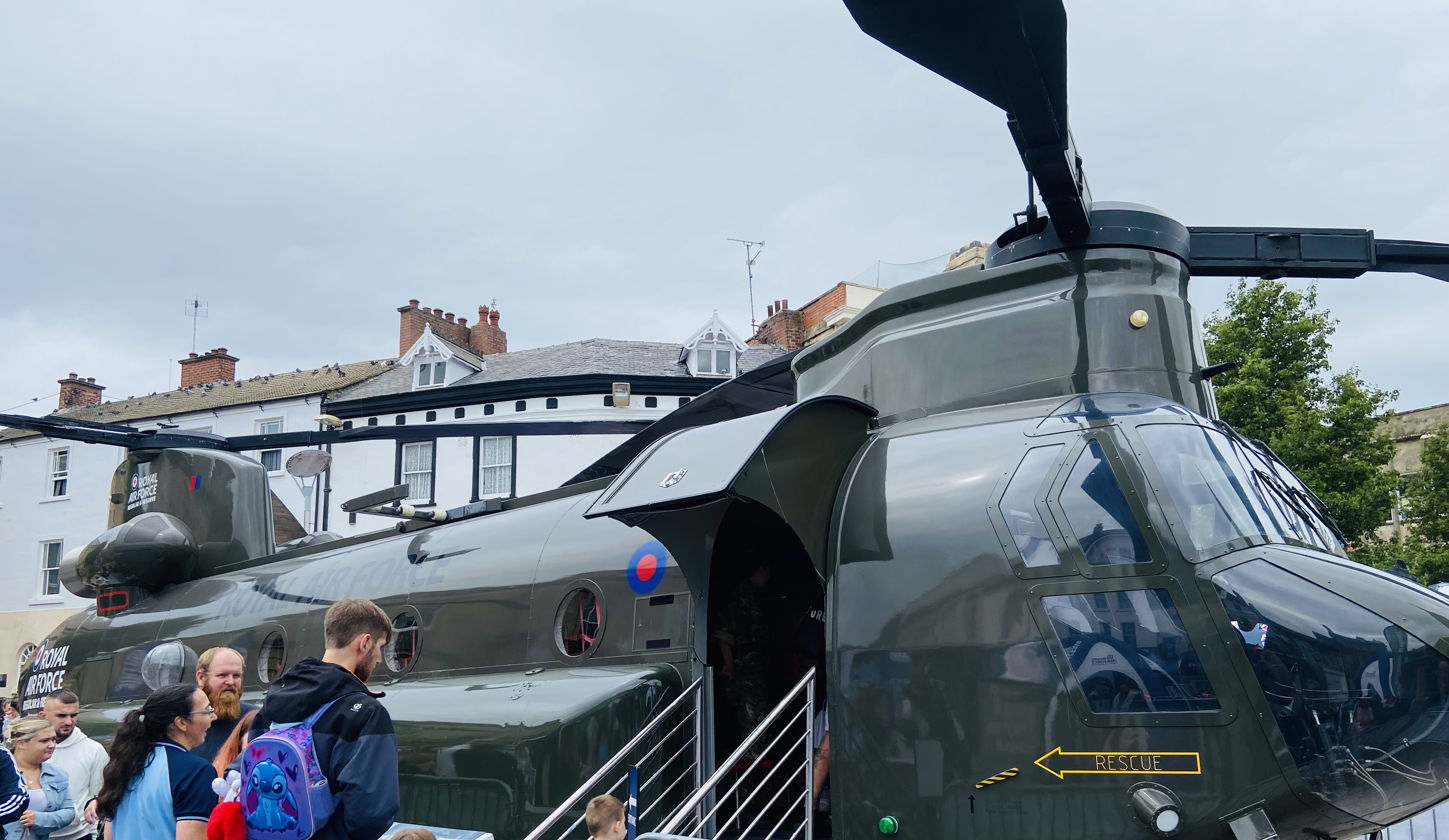
Armed Forces Day

The festival highlight is a final event in Titchfield Park called Party in the Park. Its range of entertainment includes live music acts by local bands, performances from local dance groups and activities such as face painting. For 2012 and 2013, this culminating event was cancelled for austerity reasons.

=== History ===
Mansfield was home to Venue 44, a nightclub that gave birth to the superclub Renaissance, which was operated there in 1992–1994 by Geoff Oakes and launched DJs Sasha, John Digweed and Nigel Dawson and Ian Ossia to global fame. The building was demolished in 2010.

Mansfield Town Mill, a former mill close to the town centre on the bank of the River Maun, used be a pub and live music venue. Mansfield District Council as part of the 'Mansfield Town Centre Masterplan' (2021) plan to regenerate and refurbish the building to bring it back into use. Whether that be a new pub, restaurant or hotel.

== Media ==
The local newspapers are the Chad (formerly Chronicle Advertiser) and Mansfield and Ashfield News Journal, a community newspaper.

Radio stations include Mansfield 103.2, BBC Radio Nottingham, BBC Radio Sheffield, Capital Midlands and Heart FM - Yorkshire.

Television coverage is provided by BBC East Midlands Today and ITV News Central; BBC Look North and ITV News Calendar can also be received in Mansfield.

== Sport ==
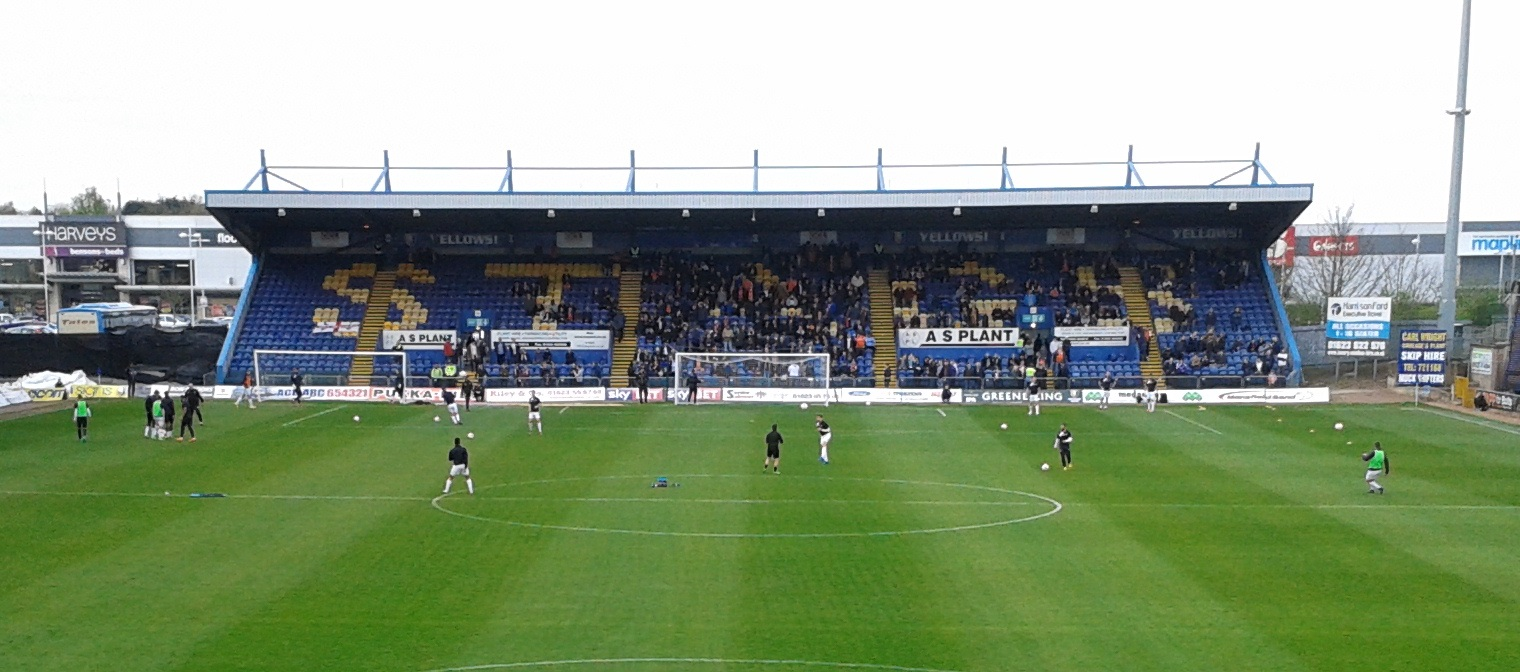
The One Call Stadium, home of Mansfield Town

The town is home to Mansfield Town FC, known as the Stags or Yellows. Relegated to the Conference National after 77 years in the Football League at the end of the 2007–2008 season, it returned to the Football League after winning the 2012–2013 Conference National title. They were promoted to League One (the third tier) for the first time in 22 years in April 2024. Non-league club AFC Mansfield plays in the Forest Town area.

Mansfield Rugby Club is a rugby union club based at Eakring Road and currently plays in Midlands 1 East, a sixth-tier league in the English rugby union system. It won the Notts Cup for five years in succession and for a record 18 times.

Mansfield Giants is the towns basketball Club and has a three-star accreditation and club mark from the English Sports Council. The team plays in the England Basketball EB2 league.

The town hosts an annual 10km run.

Angling is well supported in the district, where ponds remain from the former textile milling industry.

Tennis is catered for by Mansfield Lawn Tennis Club, located at the same site since 1883, with two grass courts and four asphalt courts, three of them floodlit. Further hard courts are found in the district at six Mansfield District Council park locations.

The town is home to Mansfield Roller Derby, a premier flat track roller derby league.

The town has two indoor swimming centres, with a third smaller pool attached to a school. The town is one of three outlets for the Nottinghamshire County Council Swim Squad, which competes as Nova Centurion. The Rebecca Adlington Swimming Centre at Sherwood Swimming Baths includes a 25-metre pool and an endless stroke-improvement training pool with variable-resistance water flow. The complex uses a ground-source heat pump backed by a biomass boiler burning wood pellets prepared from waste by a local wood yard.

At the Beijing 2008 Olympic Games, a Mansfield contestant, Rebecca Adlington, won two gold medals in 400- and 800-metre freestyle swimming. After her record-breaking success, she was welcomed home by thousands lining the streets to applaud as she passed in an open top bus. This culminated in an appearance at the Old Town Hall in the Market Square. Her success boosted swimming interest in the area, leading to expansion of swimming classes to encourage young people to begin swimming. At the 2012 Olympic Games in and around London, Adlington won two bronze medals in the 400 and 800 metres, the best performance of the Team GB swimming squad. She retired from competitive swimming in February 2013.

Water Meadows swimming complex in Bath Street, on the site of the former Mansfield Baths, has a gym and a soft-play area for children with an adjoining café; it also as one 25-metre competition pool, two other pools and a small teaching pool. The leisure lagoon pool has an artificial wave machine, a slide and a shallow area. The complex is popular with family groups and many surrounding schools make use of its facilities.

Mansfield Bowling Club is reputed to have origins in the 1700s. The club played at a bowling green to the rear of the Bowl in Hand pub in the town centre, until relocating into the grounds of Queen Elizabeth's Academy, with a new facility including pavilion opening in 2009.

== Notable people ==
=== Actors ===
- Robert Aldous (born 1934), actor who starred in Dads Army and 'Allo 'Allo!
- Dorothy Atkinson (born 1966), actress and singer, who starred in Call the Midwife and Saltburn
- Cassie Bradley, actress raised in Nottingham and Mansfield, who starred in Coronation Street.
- Stephen Critchlow (1966–2021), actor who starred in Doctor Who, Heartbeat and The Bill.
- Wes Dolan (born 1980), actor and singer/songwriter, is based in Mansfield
- Holmes Herbert (born 1882), actor who starred in the Sherlock Holmes film series and The Undying Monster (1942), amongst other films
- Matthew James Morrison (born 1992), actor who starred in EastEnders, and the film Boy Meets Boy.

=== Arts ===
- James Collinson (1825–1881), Pre-Raphaelite painter.
- Charles James Martin (1886–1955), artist
- Peter Smith (born 1967), artist.

=== Academics ===
- John Bainbridge Webster (1955–2016), theologian at University of St Andrews, who co-founded the International Journal of Systematic Theology.
- George Kirk (1911–1993), a political historian at Harvard University and later the University of Massachusetts Amherst.

=== Musicians ===
- John Balance, formally known as Geoffrey Burton (1962–2004), singer/musician with Coil
- Mark Holmes (born 1960), lead singer of Canadian new wave rock group Platinum Blonde.
- Jay McGuiness singer from The Wanted was educated in Mansfield.
- Ric Lee (born 1945), drummer with Ten Years After.
- Leo Lyons (born 1943), bassist, songwriter and record producer with Ten Years After.
- John Ogdon (1937–1989), pianist, born in Mansfield Woodhouse.
- Carly Paoli (born 1989), opera singer who has performed with Andrea Bocelli and at Windsor Castle and St James's Palace.
- Alvin Stardust, formally known as Bernard Williams Jewry (1942–2014), singer and actor was brought up in the town.

=== Politicians and economists ===
- Nicholas Crafts (1949–2023), economist, known for his contributions to economic history, was educated in Mansfield.
- Sir Ed Davey (born 1965), British politician, leader of the Liberal Democrats since 2019.
- Harry Harpham (1954–2016), coal miner and MP for Sheffield Brightside and Hillsborough
- Sir Richard Leese (born 1951), politician and former leader of Manchester City Council, he was the Deputy Mayor of Greater Manchester in 2017 to 2021.
- Alexander Malcolm (1864–1956), former member of parliament in New Zealand.
- Sir Alan Meale (born 1949), former MP for Mansfield
- Philip Stanhope, 5th Earl of Chesterfield (born 1755), diplomat and politician; former ambassador to Spain
- Dame Glenis Willmott (born 1951), medical scientist and former leader of the European Parliamentary Labour Party, was raised in the town
- Steve Yemm, MP for Mansfield since 2024.

=== Religion ===
- Jane Alexander, Bishop of Edmonton, part of the Anglican Church of Canada.
- William Chappell (1582–1649), English scholar and clergyman.
- John Darrell (1562–1602), Anglican clergyman and lawyer imprisoned as an exorcist, known for his puritan views, which were published by Samuel Harsnett and read by William Shakespeare.
- George Fox, founder of the Quakers, lived in Mansfield in 1647.
- Richard Sterne (1596–1683), Archbishop of York in 1664.

=== Science ===
- Agnes Catlow (1806–1889), science writer, who wrote a book on conchology.
- Frank Cook, surgeon, who had an interest in physiology and was instrumental in founding the first department of gynaecological endocrinology.
- Major Hayman Rooke (1723–1806), lived in Mansfield Woodhouse; he found the Major Oak tree in Sherwood Forest.
- William Martin (born 1767), naturalist and palaeontologist, who proposed that fossils support the study of natural history.
- John Medley Wood (1827–1915), botanist who contributed to the knowledge of Natal ferns.
- Humphrey Ridley (born 1653), physician and writer noted for studies into neuroanatomy, who wrote the first book about the brain in the English language.

=== Sport ===
- Rebecca Adlington (born 1989), Olympic gold and bronze medallist swimmer.
- Jake Ball (born 1991), cricketer who played for England between 2016 and 2018.
- Ben and Tom Birchall, motocycle-with-sidecar road race World Championship-winning competitors in both the F1 (2009 and 2018 seasons) and F2 categories (2016); Tom is the most successful TT passenger of all time.
- Eiran Cashin, Brighton & Hove Albion F.C. footballer, born in Mansfield.
- Kris Commons (born 1983), Celtic F.C. footballer.
- Jason Ferguson (born 1969), former snooker player and current chairman of the World Professional Billiards and Snooker Association.
- Charlotte Henshaw (born 1987), Paralympic athlete.
- Oliver Hynd (born 1994), paralympic gold medallist swimmer.
- Rob Kozluk (born 1977), footballer.
- Victoria Levitt (born 1996), Paralympic gold medallist athlete, lives in Mansfield.
- Steve Ogrizovic, footballer, born in Mansfield.
- Greg Owen (born 1972), professional golfer.
- James Perch (born 1985), Mansfield Town footballer.
- Jo Potter (born 1984), manager and former England footballer.
- Kyle Ryde (born 1997), motorcycle solo road racer.
- Steve Ward (born 1957), accoladed as oldest active professional boxer, lives in Mansfield.
- Joshua Ward-Hibbert (born 1994), basketball and former tennis player, plays for the London Lions and as a junior player in tennis at Wimbledon.
- John Whetton (born 1941), track runner.
- Oliver Wilson (born 1980), professional golfer.

=== Television, radio and playwriting ===
- Andrea Adams (1946–1995), BBC broadcaster and journalist.
- Richard Bacon (born 1976), broadcaster who was born and grew up in Mansfield. He presented Blue Peter, The Big Breakfast, Good Morning Britain, and on Capital FM and BBC Radio 5 Live
- Robert Dodsley (1704–1767), playwright and poet, wrote The King and The Miller of Mansfield and Sir John Cockle; he suggested and financed A Dictionary of the English Language.
- James Graham (born 1982), playwright and screenwriter. Known for the writings of the series of Sherwood (2022), The Way (2024), Brian and Maggie (2025) and Brexit: The Uncivil War (2019).
- Jim McGrath, horse racing commentator, was educated in Mansfield.
- Calvin Robinson (born 1985), writer and broadcaster.
- Tom Scott (born 1984 or 1985), presenter and former web developer.
- Pollyanna Woodward (born 1982), television presenter.

=== Miscellaneous ===
- Watson Fothergill (1841–1928), Victorian architect.
- Elspeth Gibson (born 1963), Nottingham-born fashion designer, studied at Mansfield College of Art and Design. Her clients have included Madonna, Zara Phillips, Cate Blanchett and Uma Thurman
- Samuel Jebb (1694–1772), physician, nonjuror and literary scholar; father of Sir Richard Jebb, 1st Baronet, who was a royal physician to George III.
- Sir John Peace (born 1949), co-founder of Experian, chairman of Burberry, chancellor of Nottingham Trent University and former Lord Lieutenant of Nottinghamshire.
- Henry Pierrepont, 1st Marquess of Dorchester (born 1606), former English peer.
- John Radford (businessman) (born 1965), owner of Mansfield Town F.C. and founder/owner of One Call Insurance.
- Helen Wilson (1864–1951), physician and social purity campaigner, surgeon at the National Temperance Hospital in London; her attitudes towards prostitution were progressive and she campaigned against its state regulation.

== International relations ==
Mansfield is twinned with:

- Heiligenhaus, Germany
- Mansfield, Massachusetts, United States
- Mansfield, Ohio, United States
- Reutov, Russia
- Stryi, Ukraine.

== See also ==
- Cantamus Girls Choir
- Portland College
