= Mansfield Railway Viaduct =

Railway viaduct in Nottinghamshire, England

Coordinates: 53.1437°N 1.1956°W

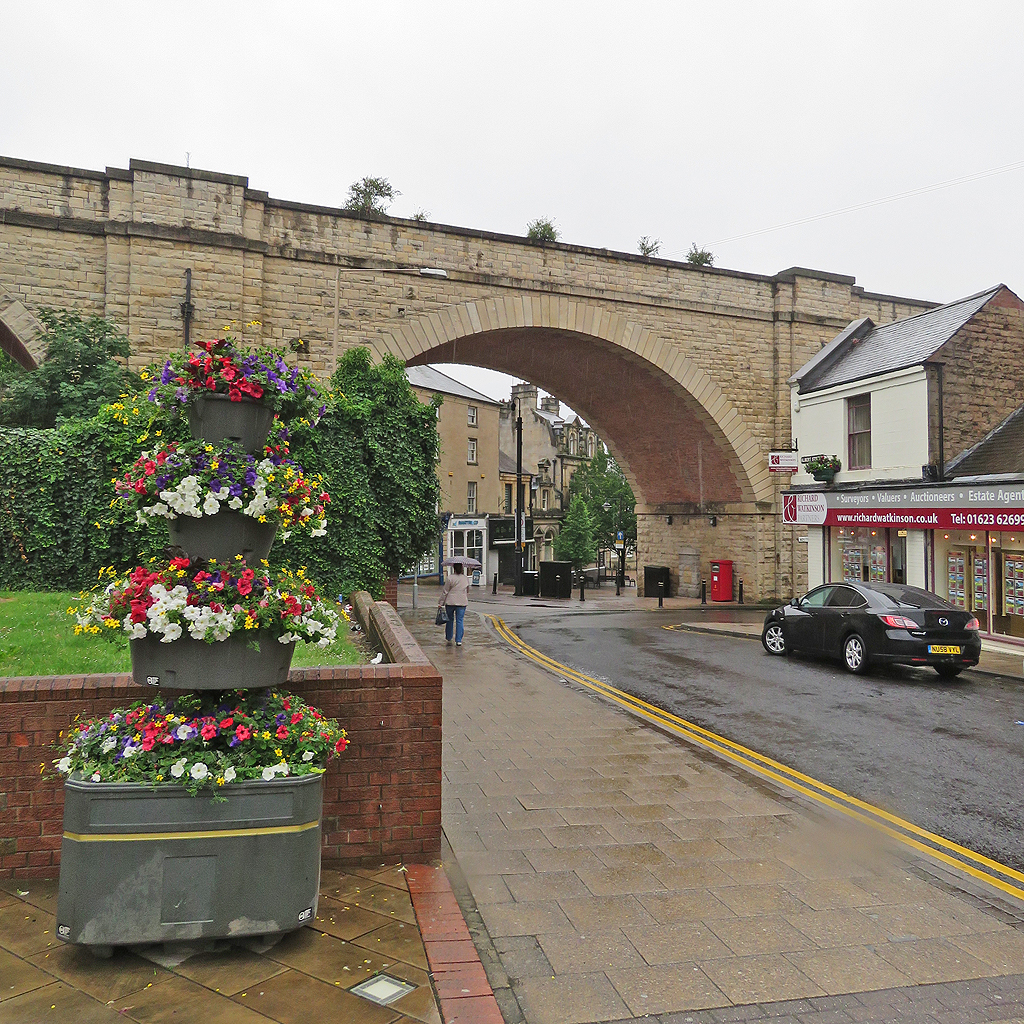
- A view of the rail line with Nottingham in one direction and Worksop to the other

- Location within Nottinghamshire
- District: Mansfield
- Shire county: Nottinghamshire
- Region: East Midlands
- Country: England
- Sovereign state: United Kingdom
- Post town: Mansfield
- Postcode district: NG18
- Dialling code: 01623

Listed Building – Grade II
- Official name: Railway Viaduct
- Designated: 30 April 1975
- Reference no.: 1287993
- Police: Nottinghamshire
- Fire: Nottinghamshire
- Ambulance: East Midlands

Mansfield Railway Viaduct is a Grade II listed viaduct crossing the town centre of Mansfield, Nottinghamshire. The 15-arch viaduct is 188 yd (172 m) long and was built for Midland Railway's 1875 Mansfield to Worksop Line. From 1995, the viaduct has carried the Robin Hood Line stopping at Mansfield Town station.

== History ==
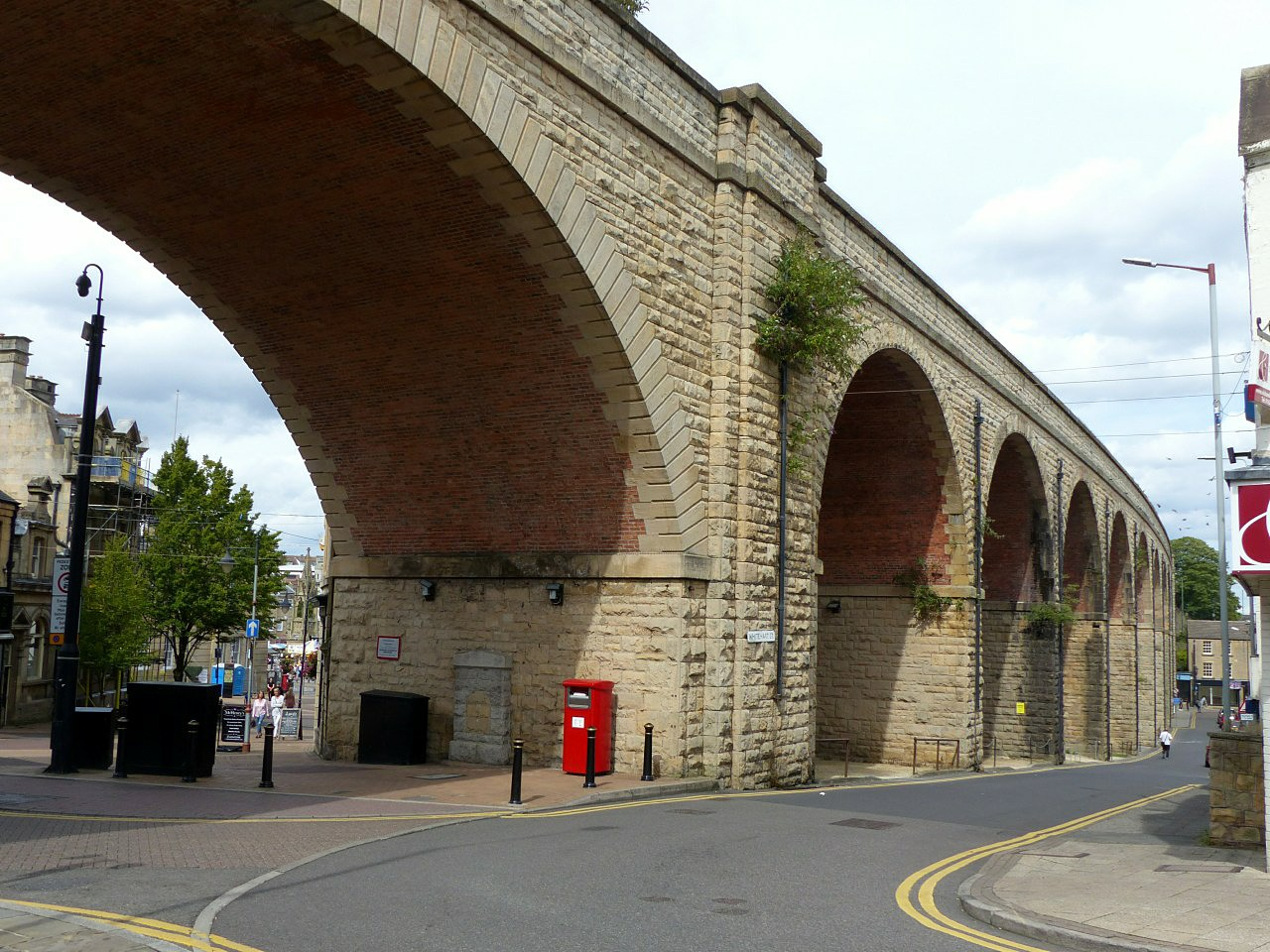
Pedestrianised Market Street to left leading to the Market Place, to right is view along White Hart Street looking towards Worksop

The viaduct can be credited to John Sydney Crossley, the chief engineer at the railway company, and consulting engineer William Barlow. Construction began in 1869.

Mansfield's former industrial success was attributed to the viaduct being built to support the export of production.

The viaduct was specialist-cleaned and stonework renovated in the early 2000s. It is illuminated by floodlighting at night.

The viaduct was included in background scenes for a 2021 drama-documentary Landscapers.
