= Mansfield District Council elections =

Local government elections in Nottinghamshire, England

Mansfield District Council elections are held every four years. Mansfield District Council is the local authority for the non-metropolitan district of Mansfield in Nottinghamshire, England. Since 2002 Mansfield has also had a directly elected mayor. Since the last boundary changes in 2023, 36 councillors have been elected from 36 wards.

== Council elections ==
- 1973 Mansfield District Council election
- 1976 Mansfield District Council election
- 1979 Mansfield District Council election (New ward boundaries)
- 1983 Mansfield District Council election
- 1987 Mansfield District Council election
- 1991 Mansfield District Council election
- 1995 Mansfield District Council election (District boundary changes took place but the number of seats remained the same)
- 1999 Mansfield District Council election
- 2003 Mansfield District Council election (New ward boundaries)
- 2007 Mansfield District Council election
- 2011 Mansfield District Council election (New ward boundaries)
- 2015 Mansfield District Council election
- 2019 Mansfield District Council election
- 2023 Mansfield District Council election (New ward boundaries)

=== Mayoral elections ===
- 2002 Mansfield mayoral election
- 2007 Mansfield mayoral election
- 2011 Mansfield mayoral election
- 2015 Mansfield mayoral election
- 2019 Mansfield mayoral election
- 2023 Mansfield mayoral election

== Results maps ==
2003 results map

2007 results map

2011 results map

2015 results map

2019 results map

2023 results map

== By-election results ==
=== 1999–2003 ===
Birklands By-Election 7 June 2001
Party	Candidate	Votes	%	±%
Labour		2,382	81.3	
Conservative		546	18.7	
Majority		1,836	62.6	
Turnout		2,928		
Labour hold		Swing		

Oakham By-Election 18 July 2002
Party	Candidate	Votes	%	±%
Conservative		371	60.1	+1.7
Labour		153	24.8	−16.8
Liberal Democrats		93	15.1	+15.1
Majority		218	35.3	
Turnout		617	10.9	
Conservative hold		Swing		

Oak Tree By-Election 12 December 2002
Party	Candidate	Votes	%	±%
Labour		290	47.4	−17.3
Independent		218	35.6	+35.6
Conservative		66	10.8	−24.5
Green		38	6.2	+6.2
Majority		72	11.8	
Turnout		612	13.6	
Labour hold		Swing		

=== 2003–2007 ===
Eakring By-Election 15 September 2005
Party	Candidate	Votes	%	±%
Labour	Robert Salmon	338	44.6	+7.6
Independent	Diane Etches	236	31.2	−3.2
Conservative	Nicholas Ward	92	12.2	−5.4
Green	Michael Bull	91	12.0	−9.0
Majority		102	13.4	
Turnout		757	14.8	
Labour gain from Independent		Swing		

Forest Town West By-Election 30 March 2006
Party	Candidate	Votes	%	±%
Labour	Alan Beastall	365	37.7	+7.8
Liberal Democrats	Richard Hallam	197	20.4	+20.4
Green	Jonathan Frost	187	19.3	−2.3
Conservative	Nicholas Ward	175	18.1	−1.9
Independent	Andrew Jones	43	4.4	−24.2
Majority		168	17.3	
Turnout		967	17.7	
Labour hold		Swing		

=== 2007–2011 ===
Lindhurst By-Election 27 September 2007
Party	Candidate	Votes	%	±%
Labour	John Smart	339	35.6	+13.8
Mansfield Independent	Christopher Wright	302	31.7	+0.7
Liberal Democrats	Marc Hollingworth	215	22.6	+22.6
Conservative	Brian Marshall	61	6.4	−8.4
Green	Michael Knight	35	3.7	−3.8
Majority		37	3.9	
Turnout		952	27.1	
Labour gain from Independent		Swing		

Portland By-Election 25 February 2010
Party	Candidate	Votes	%	±%
Labour	Brian Lohan	407	45.8	+2.2
Mansfield Independent	Deidre Appleby	263	29.6	−26.9
Conservative	Fraser McFarland	116	13.0	+13.0
Liberal Democrats	Nicholas Spencer	66	7.4	+7.4
UKIP	Philip Smith	37	4.2	+4.2
Majority		144	16.2	
Turnout		889	24.2	
Labour gain from Independent		Swing		

Sherwood By-Election 25 February 2010
Party	Candidate	Votes	%	±%
Labour	Julia Yemm	406	46.4	+8.3
Mansfield Independent	Eric Milnes	171	19.5	−42.4
Conservative	Brian Hyatt	156	17.8	+17.8
UKIP	Andrew Hamilton	93	10.6	+10.6
Liberal Democrats	Anna Ellis	49	5.6	+5.6
Majority		235	26.9	
Turnout		875	24.8	
Labour gain from Independent		Swing		

=== 2011–2015 ===
Park Hall By-Election 18 October 2011
Party	Candidate	Votes	%	±%
Labour	Ann Norman	416	53.2	−4.6
Mansfield Independent	Linda Davidson	164	21.0	−14.3
Liberal Democrats	Mark Quick	157	20.1	+13.1
UKIP	Andrea Hamilton	25	3.2	+3.2
Conservative	Fraser McFarland	20	2.6	+2.6
Majority		252	32.2	
Turnout		782		
Labour hold		Swing		

Netherfield By-Election 4 December 2014
Party	Candidate	Votes	%	±%
Labour	Lesley Wright	347	57.7	+12.1
UKIP	Sid Walker	225	37.4	+37.4
TUSC	Karen Seymour	29	4.8	+4.8
Majority		122	20.3	
Turnout		601		
Labour gain from Mansfield Independent		Swing		

=== 2015–2019 ===
Yeoman Hill By-Election 8 September 2016
Party	Candidate	Votes	%	±%
Labour	John Coxhead	278	45.7	−4.5
Mansfield Independent	Neil Williams	148	24.3	−25.5
UKIP	David Hamilton	105	17.3	+17.3
Conservative	Daniel Redfern	41	6.7	+6.7
Independent	Phil Shields	36	5.9	+5.9
Majority		130	21.3	
Turnout		608	23.5%	
Labour hold		Swing		

Warsop Carrs By-Election 24 November 2016
Party	Candidate	Votes	%	±%
Labour	Andrew Burgin	285	47.9	−25.3
Independent	Debra Barlow	211	35.5	−35.5
UKIP	Raymond Forster	74	12.4	+12.4
Conservative	Daniel Redfern	25	4.2	+4.2
Majority		74	12.4	
Turnout		595	22.2%	−36.1
Labour hold		Swing		

=== 2019–2023 ===
Sandhurst By-Election 27 June 2019
Party	Candidate	Votes	%	±%
Mansfield Independent	Dave Saunders	227	42.7	+9.0
Labour	Michelle Swordy	177	33.3	−8.3
Conservative	Cathryn Fletcher	71	13.4	−8.9
UKIP	Daniel Hartshorn	56	10.5	+10.5
Majority		50	9.4	
Turnout		531		
Mansfield Independent gain from Labour		Swing		

Oakham By-Election 6 May 2021
Party	Candidate	Votes	%	±%
Conservative	Robert Elliman	428	51.6	+7.1
Labour	Michelle Swordy	228	27.5	−1.8
Mansfield Independent	Kevin Brown	104	12.5	−13.7
Independent	Lauren Kimberley	69	8.3	+8.3
Majority		200	24.1	
Turnout		829		
Conservative hold		Swing		

Oak Tree By-Election 15 September 2022
Party	Candidate	Votes	%	±%
Labour	Paul Henshaw	141	47.0	+13.6
Mansfield Independent	Gemma Canlin	91	30.3	−25.8
Conservative	Neil Smith	45	15.0	+4.5
Freedom Alliance	Julie Tasker	15	5.0	+5.0
TUSC	Milo Tooley-Okonkwo	8	2.7	+2.7
Majority		50	16.7	
Turnout		300		
Labour gain from Mansfield Independent		Swing		

=== 2023–2027 ===
A by-election was held following the resignation of Conservative councillor Ben Brown.

West Bank By-Election 20 June 2024
Party	Candidate	Votes	%	±%
Labour	Garry Cole	169	38.4	+6.6
Mansfield Independent	Faz Choudhury	142	32.3	+5.1
Conservative	Steve Walmsley	98	22.3	−14.4
Green	Shaun Thornton	14	3.2	New
Liberal Democrats	Thorsten Altenkirch	10	2.3	New
TUSC	Karen Seymour	7	1.6	New
Majority		27	6.1	+1.2
Turnout		440		
Labour gain from Conservative		Swing	▲0.75	
