= Mansfield Independents =

- Founded: 14 July 2005
- Dissolved: 13 May 2025
- Headquarters: Mansfield, Nottinghamshire
- Ideology: Localism
- Slogan: Putting people before politics

Mansfield Independents, previously known as Mansfield Independent Forum, was a local political party in the local government district of Mansfield in Nottinghamshire, England. It was officially registered in 2005, having already successfully campaigned for the election of Tony Egginton as Mayor of Mansfield two years earlier. Egginton had stood for election after being convinced to do so by the leader of the pro-Mayoralty campaign, Stewart Rickersey.

At the May 2023 Mansfield local elections, four MI members were successful. On 25 October 2024, three long standing members defected to Reform UK, marking a new political group on the council. The party was de-registered in May 2025.

== History ==
The directly elected Mayor of Mansfield was created following moves made by Mansfield-based businessman Stuart Rickersey to change the governance of Mansfield through a public referendum. Local newsagent Tony Egginton was encouraged to stand as an independent candidate in the ensuing election, and was elected to the position on 17 October 2002.

Following Egginton's successful election as Mayor, Rickersey then recruited many ward councillor-candidates to challenge Labour's traditional domination at the May 2003 local elections, winning control of the council with 25 seats. Most of the newly elected councillors were new and inexperienced. Egginton formed his Cabinet mostly of MIF members including Rickersey as Portfolio Holder for Corporate Issues. The party was officially registered with the electoral commission on 14 July 2005, formalising the existence of a party that had unofficially existed since Egginton's election. Fellow Mansfield Independent Kate Allsop was elected as Executive Mayor to succeed Egginton following his retirement in 2015.

In 2015 Councillor Sid Walker of the Mansfield Independents, then sitting as a UKIP councillor, was investigated by Mansfield District Council for posting racist material on Facebook and calling a constituent a "left wing bitch".

In September 2019 the party was renamed to the Mansfield Independents. The party was formally dissolved and de-registered with the Electoral Commission in May 2025.

== Election results ==
The Mansfield Independent Forum has contested elections since Tony Egginton's election in 2002, first informally as an alliance of independent councillors in 2003 and then formally as a registered UK political party from 2005 onwards.

=== Mayoral elections ===
Tony Egginton served as Mayor of Mansfield from 2002 until his retirement in 2015. He was succeeded by Kate Allsop, also of the Mansfield Independents.

Year	Candidate	Popular vote		Position	Majority
Year	Candidate	1st Pref	2nd Pref	Position	Majority
2002	Tony Egginton	4,150	5,951	#1	588
2007	Tony Egginton	12,015	13,720	#1	4,936
2011	Tony Egginton	10,901	12,680	#1	63
2015	Kate Allsop	17,604	22,600	#1	2,880
2019	Kate Allsop	5,860	7,928	#2	-2
2023	Mick Barton	4,992	N/A	#3	-4,995

=== District Council elections ===
Mansfield Independent Forum councillors held a majority on Mansfield District Council from 2003 to 2011. The party lost control of the council to the Labour Party in 2011 before regaining control in 2015. In the 2023 local elections, the Mansfield Independents suffered an almost total wipe-out, losing all but four of their seats on Mansfield District Council, and finishing in third place in the Mayoral Election.

Year	Councillors	Control
2003	25 / 37	Mansfield Independent
2007	29 / 37	Mansfield Independent
2011	10 / 37	Labour
2015	15 / 37	Mansfield Independent
2019	13 / 37	No Overall Control
2023	4 / 37	Labour

=== County Council elections ===
Mansfield Independent Forum has been represented on Nottinghamshire County Council since 2009. Following the 2017 election the party became the junior partner in a governing coalition with the Conservatives.

Year	Councillors	Control
2005	0 / 66	Labour
2009	6 / 66	Conservative
2013	2 / 66	Labour
2017	4 / 66	No overall control
2021	0 / 66	Conservative

=== UK Parliament elections ===
The party fielded a candidate in the 2005 election, coming third behind Labour and the Conservatives. In the 2010 general election they were reduced to fourth place behind the Liberal Democrats. The party did not field official candidates in the 2015, 2017 or 2019 elections.

Year	Candidate	Votes	%	Position
2005	Stewart Rickersey	6,491	17.0	#3
2010	Andre Camilleri	4,339	9.0	#4

== See also ==
- Nottinghamshire local elections
- 2015 Mansfield District Council election
