= 2017 Nottinghamshire County Council election =

2017 election of all 66 councillors to Nottinghamshire County Council

- 4 May 2017

All 66 seats to Nottinghamshire County Council 34 seats needed for a majority
- Turnout: 36.2% (▲+3.0)
	First party	Second party	Third party
Leader	Kay Cutts	Alan Rhodes	Jason Zadrozny
Party	Conservative	Labour	Ashfield Independents
Last election	21	34
Seats won	31	23	5
Seat change	▲10	▼11	▲5
Popular vote	88,093	72,997	10,554
Percentage	39.4%	32.7%	4.7%
Swing	▲+12.5	▼-2.4	-
- Map showing the results of the 2017 Nottinghamshire County Council elections.
Council control before election
Labour
Council control after election
No overall control

The 2017 Nottinghamshire County Council election took place on 4 May 2017 as part of the 2017 local elections in the United Kingdom. The whole council of 66 councillors was elected for a four-year term spanning 56 electoral divisions, a minority of which return two councillors. The voting system used is first-past-the-post.

The result was no overall party group of candidates formed a majority. Before the election the council, had a one-councillor Labour Party majority — after the election the Labour Party formed the second-largest party group, with the Conservative Party being the largest party. The Conservatives formed a coalition with the Mansfield Independent Forum which took control of the council, with the Conservative leader, Kay Cutts, being appointed leader of the council at the council's annual meeting following the election.

A review by the Local Government Boundary Commission for England led to altered boundaries for this election.

== Overall election results ==
Political composition of the council following the election

Overall Turnout
Registered electors	608,282
Votes cast	220,048
Turnout	36.2% (▲+3.0)

Nottinghamshire County Council election 2017
Party	Candidates						Votes		
Party	Stood	Elected	Gained	Unseated	Net	% of total	%	No.	Net %
Conservative	57	31	10	Steady	▲10		39.4	88,093	▲+12.5
Labour	64	23	Steady	11	▼11		32.7	72,997	▼-2.4
Ashfield Ind.	5	5	5	Steady	▲5		4.7	10,554	NEW
Mansfield Independent	4	4	2	Steady	▲2		2.6	5,770	▼-0.1
Liberal Democrats	52	1	Steady	4	▼4		7.9	17,731	▼-2.6
Selston Parish Independents	1	1	Steady	Steady	Steady		0.8	1,848	
UKIP	42	0	Steady	Steady	Steady		5.0	11,102	▼-13.1
Green	21	0	Steady	Steady	Steady		2.0	4,573	▲+0.2
Independent	11	1					4.4	9,767	▼-0.2
Hucknall First Community Forum	3	0	Steady	Steady	Steady		0.3	638	
TUSC	3	0	Steady	Steady	Steady		0.2	422	Steady

== Results by electoral division ==
=== Ashfield District ===
(10 seats, 10 electoral divisions)

Ashfield District
Party	Candidates						Votes		
Party	Stood	Elected	Gained	Unseated	Net	% of total	%	No.	Net %
Ashfield Ind.	5	5	5	Steady	▲5		31.5	10,554	▲31.5
Conservative	7	3	3	Steady	▲3		18.5	6,221	▲1.6
Labour	10	1	Steady	5	▼5		28.5	9,562	▼10.6
Selston Parish Independents	1	1	Steady	Steady	Steady		5.5	1,848	
UKIP	10	0	Steady	Steady	Steady		7.5	2,514	▼13.1
Independent	2	0	Steady	Steady	Steady		5.5	1,833	▲2.7
Hucknall First Community Forum	3	0	Steady	Steady	Steady		1.9	638	Steady
Liberal Democrats	5	0	Steady	3	▼3		1.1	383	▼13.4

Ashfield Turnout
Registered electors	93,196
Votes cast	33,553
Turnout	36.0% (▲+4.6)

==== Ashfields ====
Ashfields (1 seat)
Party	Candidate	Votes	%
Ashfield Ind.	Jason Zadrozny (inc)*	1,524	50.1
Labour	Linford Martyn Gibbons	800	26.3
Conservative	Jade Melissa Ancliff	505	16.6
UKIP	Ian William Wright	211	6.9
Turnout		3,040	35.8
Registered electors		8,502	
Ashfield Ind. win (new seat)			

* Incumbent councillor for Sutton in Ashfield North division prior to boundary changes.

==== Hucknall North ====
Hucknall North (1 seat)
Party	Candidate	Votes	%
Conservative	Ben Bradley	1,539	47.9
Labour	Alice Elisabeth Grice	1,141	35.5
Hucknall First Community Forum	John Morton Anthony Wilmott	282	8.8
UKIP	Ray Young	161	5.0
Liberal Democrats	James Alan Harvey	89	2.8
Turnout		3,212	39.1
Registered electors		8,231	
Conservative win (new seat)			

==== Hucknall South ====
Hucknall South (1 seat)
Party	Candidate	Votes	%
Conservative	Phil Rostance	1,136	40.5
Labour	John Hartley Wilkinson	1,062	37.9
UKIP	Jack Holland	313	11.2
Hucknall First Community Forum	Trevor Charles Locke	196	7.0
Liberal Democrats	Alex Sjoberg-Weekes	97	3.5
Turnout		2,804	30.8
Registered electors		9,131	
Conservative win (new seat)			

==== Hucknall West ====
Hucknall West (1 seat)
Party	Candidate	Votes	%
Conservative	Kevin Thomas Rostance	1,535	51.6
Labour	Joe Watkinson	988	33.2
UKIP	Stuart James Bestwick	239	8.0
Hucknall First Community Forum	Geoff Ware	160	5.4
Liberal Democrats	Robert Andrew Charlesworth	54	1.8
Turnout		2,976	35.5
Registered electors		8,391	
Conservative win (new seat)			

==== Kirkby North ====
Division boundaries underwent significant changes compared with the boundaries used at the previous election.

Kirkby North (1 seat)
Party	Candidate	Votes	%
Labour	John Knight (inc)	1,211	45.3
Conservative	Sam Ancliff	951	35.6
UKIP	Janet Jeanes	400	15.0
Liberal Democrats	John Timothy Ingram	111	4.2
Turnout		2,673	29.0
Registered electors		9,255	
Labour win (new boundaries)			

==== Kirkby South ====
Division boundaries underwent significant changes compared with the boundaries used at the previous election.

Kirkby South (1 seat)
Party	Candidate	Votes	%
Ashfield Ind.	Rachel Madden	2,364	61.8
Labour	Donna Samantha Jane Gilbert	981	25.7
UKIP	Gabriella Wright	365	9.5
Independent	Mark John Harrison	114	3.0
Turnout		3,824	39.7
Registered electors		9,682	
Ashfield Ind. win (new boundaries)			

==== Selston ====
There were minor changes to the boundaries of the division.

Selston (1 seat)
Party	Candidate	Votes	%	±%
Selston Parish Independents	David Martin	1,848	40.8	▼−31.0
Independent	Sam Wilson	1,719	38.0	NEW
Labour	Ruth Stevens	567	12.5	▼−11.0
Conservative	Shanade Bradley	260	5.7	NEW
UKIP	Carole Terzza	100	2.2	NEW
Liberal Democrats	Josie Marsters	32	0.7	NEW
Turnout		4,526	44.1	▲+10.3
Registered electors		10,271		
Independent hold		Swing		

==== Sutton Central & East ====
Sutton Central & East (1 seat)
Party	Candidate	Votes	%
Ashfield Ind.	Samantha Deakin	1,758	60.1
Labour	Steve Carroll	925	31.6
UKIP	Sally Cook	241	8.2
Turnout		2,924	31.0
Registered electors		9,484	
Ashfield Ind. win (new boundaries)			

==== Sutton North ====
Division boundaries underwent significant changes compared with the boundaries used at the previous election.

Sutton North (1 seat)
Party	Candidate	Votes	%
Ashfield Ind.	Helen-Ann Smith	2,370	65.2
Labour	Helen Joy Hollis	951	26.1
UKIP	Geoff Thorpe	316	8.7
Turnout		3,637	35.9
Registered electors		10,176	
Ashfield Ind. win (new boundaries)			

==== Sutton West ====
Division boundaries underwent significant changes compared with the boundaries used at the previous election.

Sutton West (1 seat)
Party	Candidate	Votes	%
Ashfield Ind.	Tom Hollis (inc)	2,538	64.5
Labour	Glenys Christina Maxwell	936	23.8
Conservative	John Matson Baker	295	7.5
UKIP	Moira Jean Sansom	168	4.3
Turnout		3,937	39.2
Registered electors		10,073	
Ashfield Ind. win (new boundaries)			

=== Bassetlaw District ===
(9 seats, 9 electoral divisions)

Bassetlaw District
Party	Candidates						Votes		
Party	Stood	Elected	Gained	Unseated	Net	% of total	%	No.	Net %
Labour	8	5	Steady	2	▼2		44.4	12,077	▼6.1
Conservative	8	4	2	Steady	▲2		36.1	9,827	▲8.3
UKIP	8	0	Steady	Steady	Steady		9.0	2,436	▼9.4
Liberal Democrats	9	0	Steady	Steady	Steady		6.5	1,758	▲4.1
Independent	1	0	Steady	Steady	Steady		4.1	1,125	▲3.1

Bassetlaw Turnout
Registered electors	86,665
Votes cast	27,223
Turnout	31.4% (▲+1.5)

==== Blyth & Harworth ====
There were minor changes to the boundaries of the division.

Blyth and Harworth (1 seat)
Party	Candidate	Votes	%	±%
Labour	Sheila Place (inc)	1,529	61.5	▼−3.6
Conservative	Adam Gray	444	17.9	▲+3.7
UKIP	John Hudson	289	11.6	▼−5.8
Liberal Democrats	Alex Cowan	224	9.0	▲+5.7
Turnout		2,486	26.5	▼−0.5
Registered electors		9,384		
Labour hold		Swing		

==== Misterton ====
Division boundaries underwent significant changes compared with the boundaries used at the previous election.

Misterton (1 seat)
Party	Candidate	Votes	%
Conservative	Tracey Lee Taylor	1,994	54.4
Independent	Hazel Brand	1,125	30.7
Liberal Democrats	Mark Peter Hunter	293	8.0
UKIP	Dave Taylor	251	6.9
Turnout		3,663	35.3
Registered electors		10,472	
Conservative win (new boundaries)			

==== Retford East ====
Retford East (1 seat)
Party	Candidate	Votes	%	±%
Conservative	Steve Vickers	1,328	44.8	▲+11.3
Labour	Pamela Skelding (inc)	1,291	43.6	▼−3.2
UKIP	Jon Wade	190	6.4	▼−10.2
Liberal Democrats	Stephen Ware	152	5.1	▲+2.0
Turnout		2,961	32.9	Steady
Registered electors		8,988		
Conservative gain from Labour		Swing		

==== Retford West ====
Division boundaries underwent significant changes compared with the boundaries used at the previous election.

Retford West (1 seat)
Party	Candidate	Votes	%
Conservative	Mike Quigley	1,411	46.4
Labour	Darrell Eduard Pulk	1,357	44.6
Liberal Democrats	Jennifer Anne Coggles	272	8.9
Turnout		3,040	32.3
Registered electors		9,445	
Conservative win (new boundaries)			

==== Tuxford ====
Division boundaries underwent significant changes compared with the boundaries used at the previous election.

Tuxford (1 seat)
Party	Candidate	Votes	%
Conservative	John Ogle (inc)	2,245	71.9
Labour	Frederick Gallucci	544	17.4
UKIP	Tony Clayton	176	5.6
Liberal Democrats	Mat Duveen	159	5.1
Turnout		3,124	35.3
Registered electors		8,885	
Conservative win (new boundaries)			

==== Worksop East ====
Division boundaries underwent significant changes compared with the boundaries used at the previous election.

Worksop East (1 seat)
Party	Candidate	Votes	%
Labour	Glynn Gilfoyle (inc)	1,855	71.1
Conservative	Michael Tom Gray	372	14.3
UKIP	Andrew Airey	277	10.6
Liberal Democrats	Connor Lewis Savage	105	4.0
Turnout		2,609	26.4
Registered electors		9,890	
Labour win (new boundaries)			

==== Worksop North ====
Division boundaries underwent significant changes compared with the boundaries used at the previous election.

Worksop North (1 seat)
Party	Candidate	Votes	%
Labour	Alan Rhodes (inc)*	2,000	60.5
Conservative	Richard Barnes	933	28.2
UKIP	Roger Martin Vernon	263	8.0
Liberal Democrats	Adam Davies	110	3.3
Turnout		3,306	33.3
Registered electors		9,953	
Labour win (new boundaries)			

* Incumbent councillor for Worksop North East & Carlton division prior to boundary changes.

==== Worksop South ====
Division boundaries underwent significant changes compared with the boundaries used at the previous election.

Worksop South (1 seat)
Party	Candidate	Votes	%
Labour	Kevin Maurizio Greaves (inc)*	1,801	54.7
Conservative	Emma Jane Auckland	1,100	33.4
UKIP	Christopher Paul Barker	242	7.4
Liberal Democrats	Leon Maurice Duveen	147	4.5
Turnout		3,290	33.8
Registered electors		9,770	
Labour win (new boundaries)			

* Incumbent councillor for Worksop West division prior to boundary changes.

==== Worksop West ====
Division boundaries underwent significant changes compared with the boundaries used at the previous election.

Worksop West (1 seat)
Party	Candidate	Votes	%
Labour	Sybil Jacqueline Fielding (inc)*	1,700	62.0
UKIP	Rachel Elizabeth Briggs	748	27.3
Liberal Democrats	Simon Andrew Russell	296	10.8
Turnout		2,744	28.0
Registered electors		9,878	
Labour win (new boundaries)			

* Incumbent councillor for Worksop North division prior to boundary changes.

=== Broxtowe Borough ===
(9 seats, 7 electoral divisions)

Broxtowe Borough
Party	Candidates						Votes		
Party	Stood	Elected	Gained	Unseated	Net	% of total	%	No.	Net %
Conservative	9	7	3	Steady	▲3		42.9	15,215	▲+17.0
Labour	9	1	Steady	Steady	Steady		28.6	10,156	▲+0.6
Liberal Democrats	7	1	Steady	4	▼4		14.9	5,286	▼-6.9
Independent	2	0	Steady	Steady	Steady		4.7	1,680	▲+1.7
UKIP	8	0	Steady	Steady	Steady		4.6	1,617	▼-12.7
Green	6	0	Steady	Steady	Steady		4.2	1,506	▲+0.6

Broxtowe Turnout
Registered electors	84,726
Votes cast	33,851
Turnout	40.0% (▲+3.0)

==== Beeston Central & Rylands ====
Beeston Central & Rylands (1 seat)
Party	Candidate	Votes	%
Labour	Kate Foale (inc)*	2,051	52.3
Conservative	Trish Roberts-Thomson	1,269	32.3
Liberal Democrats	Gav Slater	387	9.9
Green	Sylvia Anne Rule	217	5.5
Turnout		3,924	41.8
Registered electors		9,396	
Labour win (new seat)			

* Incumbent councillor for Beeston South and Attenborough division prior to boundary changes.

==== Bramcote & Beeston North ====
Bramcote & Beeston North (1 seat)
Party	Candidate	Votes	%
Liberal Democrats	Steve Carr (inc)*	1,966	41.2
Conservative	Tony Smith	1,355	28.4
Labour	Ellie Winfield	1,178	24.7
Independent	Paul Constantine Nathanail	150	3.1
UKIP	Chris Cobb	119	2.5
Turnout		4,768	48.2
Registered electors		9,905	
Liberal Democrats win (new seat)			

* Incumbent councillor for Beeston North division prior to boundary changes.

==== Eastwood ====
There were minor changes to the boundaries of the division.

Eastwood (1 seat)
Party	Candidate	Votes	%	±%
Conservative	Tony Harper	1,180	38.5	▲+30.6
Liberal Democrats	Keith Longdon (inc)	861	28.1	▼−17.6
Labour	David Griffiths	721	23.5	▼−7.4
UKIP	Paul Tordoff	219	7.1	▼−6.2
Green	Pat Morton	84	2.7	NEW
Turnout		3,065	32.8	▲+0.4
Registered electors		9,358		
Conservative gain from Liberal Democrats		Swing		

==== Greasley & Brinsley ====
Greasley & Brinsley (1 seat)
Party	Candidate	Votes	%
Conservative	John William Handley (inc)*	2,159	61.0
Labour	David Thomas Patrick	774	21.9
UKIP	Tracey Ann Cahill	358	10.1
Green	Bethan Hewis	248	7.0
Turnout		3,539	37.5
Registered electors		9,446	
Conservative win (new seat)			

* Incumbent councillor for Beauvale division prior to boundary changes.

==== Nuthall & Kimberley ====
Nuthall & Kimberley (1 seat)
Party	Candidate	Votes	%
Conservative	Philip John Owen (inc)*	2,132	56.0
Labour	Teresa Ann Cullen	1,011	26.5
Green	Kat Boettge	397	10.4
UKIP	Graham Andrew Jones	268	7.0
Turnout		3,808	37.4
Registered electors		10,192	
Conservative win (new seat)			

* Incumbent councillor for Nuthall division prior to boundary changes.

==== Stapleford & Broxtowe Central ====
Stapleford & Broxtowe Central (2 seats)
Party	Candidate	Votes	%
Conservative	John Anthony Doddy (inc)*	2,692	39.3
Conservative	William John Longdon	2,179	31.8
Labour	John Liam Sean McGrath	2,034	29.7
Labour	Lisa Marie Clarke	1,903	27.8
Independent	Richard Danny MacRae	1,530	22.3
Liberal Democrats	Jacky Williams	1,147	16.7
Liberal Democrats	Tim Hallam	1,101	16.1
UKIP	Nina Peterson-Tait	286	4.2
UKIP	Daniel Roy Stowell	216	3.2
Turnout		6,855	39.8
Registered electors		17,206	
Conservative win (new seat)			
Conservative win (new seat)			

* Incumbent councillor for Chilwell & Toton division prior to boundary changes.

==== Toton, Chilwell & Attenborough ====
Toton, Chilwell & Attenborough (2 seats)
Party	Candidate	Votes	%
Conservative	Eric Kerry	3,817	48.5
Conservative	Richard Ian Jackson (inc)*	3,811	48.4
Labour	Dawn Angela Elliott	2,387	30.3
Labour	Tom Roberts	2,154	27.4
Liberal Democrats	Graham Heal	925	11.7
Liberal Democrats	Si Frost	709	9.0
Green	Richard David Eddleston	560	7.1
Green	Mary Evelyn Venning	460	5.8
UKIP	Mick Ashton	367	4.7
UKIP	Tony Hall	302	3.8
Turnout		7,892	41.1
Registered electors		19,223	
Conservative win (new seat)			
Conservative win (new seat)			

* Incumbent councillor for Chilwell & Toton division prior to boundary changes.

=== Gedling Borough ===
(9 seats, 6 electoral divisions)

Gedling Borough
Party	Candidates						Votes		
Party	Stood	Elected	Gained	Unseated	Net	% of total	%	No.	Net %
Labour	9	7	Steady	Steady	Steady		43.9	24,021	▲2.7
Conservative	9	2	Steady	Steady	Steady		42.4	23,184	▲13.7
Liberal Democrats	9	0	Steady	Steady	Steady		6.1	3,339	▲0.2
UKIP	9	0	Steady	Steady	Steady		5.2	2,859	▼17.1
Green	6	0	Steady	Steady	Steady		2.3	1,239	▲0.9
Independent	1	0	Steady	Steady	Steady		0.2	82	▼0.3

Gedling Turnout
Registered electors	88,096
Votes cast	33,325
Turnout	37.8% (▲+3.7)

==== Arnold North ====
Division boundaries underwent significant changes compared with the boundaries used at the previous election.

Arnold North (2 seats)
Party	Candidate	Votes	%
Labour	Pauline Annette Allan (inc)	3,377	45.5
Labour	Michael Richard Payne (inc)	3,309	44.5
Conservative	James Anthony Patrick Faulconbridge	3,171	42.7
Conservative	Carol Pepper	3,157	42.5
UKIP	George Eric Rose	426	5.7
UKIP	David William Voce	400	5.4
Liberal Democrats	Tad Jones	229	3.1
Liberal Democrats	Andrew Julian Swift	226	3.0
Green	Jeannie Thompson	169	2.3
Green	Jim Norris	143	1.9
Turnout		7,438	37.2
Registered electors		20,002	
Labour win (new boundaries)			
Labour win (new boundaries)			

==== Arnold South ====
Division boundaries underwent significant changes compared with the boundaries used at the previous election.

Arnold South (2 seats)
Party	Candidate	Votes	%
Labour	William John Clarke	3,842	47.4
Labour	Muriel Weisz (inc)	3,787	46.7
Conservative	Michael James Adams	3,184	39.2
Conservative	Jane Maria Walker	2,804	34.6
Liberal Democrats	Robert Andrew Swift	544	6.7
Liberal Democrats	Jason Martin Stansfield	499	6.1
UKIP	John Colin Hart	443	5.5
UKIP	Jean Olive Truman	334	4.1
Green	Margret Susan Barbara Vince	255	3.1
Green	Jim Stuart	225	2.8
Turnout		8,122	39.8
Registered electors		20,431	
Labour win (new boundaries)			
Labour win (new boundaries)			

==== Calverton ====
Calverton (1 seat)
Party	Candidate	Votes	%	±%
Conservative	Boyd Elliott (inc)	2,492	61.3	▲+21.8
Labour	Mike Hope	1,104	27.2	▼−0.6
Liberal Democrats	Marguerite Wright	285	7.0	▲+4.8
UKIP	Lee Waters	183	4.5	▼−18.5
Turnout		4,064	40.5	▲+4.5
Registered electors		10,026		
Conservative hold		Swing		

==== Carlton East ====
Division boundaries underwent significant changes compared with the boundaries used at the previous election.

Carlton East (1 seat)
Party	Candidate	Votes	%
Labour	Nicki Brooks (inc)	1,576	44.1
Conservative	Kevin Backhouse Doyle	1,547	43.3
Liberal Democrats	John Edward Flynn	229	6.4
UKIP	Graham Kenneth Roebuck	140	3.9
Independent	Ray Ellis	82	2.3
Turnout		3,574	37.4
Registered electors		9,588	
Labour win (new boundaries)			

==== Carlton West ====
Division boundaries underwent significant changes compared with the boundaries used at the previous election.

Carlton West (2 seats)
Party	Candidate	Votes	%
Labour	Jim Creamer (inc)	3,213	47.8
Labour	Errol George Henry	3,165	47.1
Conservative	Robert James Dawson	2,260	33.6
Conservative	Ged Clarke	2,243	33.4
Liberal Democrats	Andrew Mark Ellwood	653	9.7
Liberal Democrats	Paul Anthony Hughes	551	8.2
UKIP	Piero Loi	387	5.8
UKIP	Philip Anthony Pritchard	367	5.5
Green	Laurence James Baldwin	332	4.9
Turnout		6,736	33.8
Registered electors		19,927	
Labour win (new boundaries)			
Labour win (new boundaries)			

==== Newstead ====
Newstead (1 seat)
Party	Candidate	Votes	%	±%
Conservative	Christopher Barnfather (inc)	2,326	68.6	▲+18.0
Labour	Michael Smith	648	19.1	▼−2.5
UKIP	Rhea Waters	179	5.3	▼−19.4
Liberal Democrats	David Watts	123	3.6	▲+0.5
Green	Rebecca Connick	115	3.4	NEW
Turnout		3,391	41.8	▲+5.2
Registered electors		8,122		
Conservative hold		Swing		

=== Mansfield District ===
(9 seats, 5 electoral divisions)

Mansfield District
Party	Candidates						Votes		
Party	Stood	Elected	Gained	Unseated	Net	% of total	%	No.	Net %
Labour	9	5	Steady	2	▼2		42.6	16,645	▲0.8
Mansfield Independent	4	4	2	Steady	▲2		27.6	10,759	▲4.2
Conservative	4	0	Steady	Steady	Steady		13.1	5,107	▲7.0
Liberal Democrats	6	0	Steady	Steady	Steady		4.2	1,629	▲3.1
UKIP	5	0	Steady	Steady	Steady		10.3	4,010	▼8.7
TUSC	3	0	Steady	Steady	Steady		1.1	422	Steady
Independent	1	0	Steady	Steady	Steady		1.2	461	▲0.5

Mansfield Turnout
Registered electors	81,008
Votes cast	22,817
Turnout	28.2% (▲+0.6)

==== East Mansfield ====
East Mansfield (2 seats)
Party	Candidate	Votes	%	±%
Mansfield Independent	Martin Wright	2,695	53.9	▲+23.9
Mansfield Independent	Vaughan Hopewell	2,450	49.0	▲+21.6
Labour	Alan Bell (inc)	1,799	36.0	Steady
Labour	Colleen Harwood (inc)	1,699	34.0	▲+1.4
Liberal Democrats	Christopher Morris	357	7.1	NEW
TUSC	Tom Hunt	112	2.2	NEW
Turnout		4,997	27.3	▼−0.5
Registered electors		18,321		
Mansfield Independent gain from Labour		Swing		
Mansfield Independent gain from Labour		Swing		

==== North Mansfield ====
There were minor changes to the boundaries of the division.

North Mansfield (2 seats)
Party	Candidate	Votes	%	±%
Labour	Joyce Bosnjak (inc)	2,557	49.7	▼−0.8
Labour	Parry Tsimbiridis (inc)	2,143	41.7	▲+0.2
Conservative	Daniel Redfern	1,924	37.4	▲+25.3
UKIP	Raymond Forster	1,019	19.8	NEW
UKIP	David Hamilton	848	16.5	▼−16.2
Liberal Democrats	Clive Trussel	386	7.5	▲+2.0
TUSC	Karen Seymour	154	3.0	Steady
Turnout		5,142	28.6	
Registered electors		18,003		
Labour hold		Swing		
Labour hold		Swing		

==== South Mansfield ====
There were minor changes to the boundaries of the division.

South Mansfield (2 seats)
Party	Candidate	Votes	%	±%
Mansfield Independent	Stephen Garner (inc)	3,075	56.1	▲+4.4
Mansfield Independent	Andy Sissons (inc)	2,539	46.3	▲+1.6
Labour	Charles Hammersley	1,280	23.3	▼−9.3
Labour	Darren Hunt	1,268	23.1	▼−7.9
Conservative	Paul Saxelby	1,143	20.8	NEW
Independent	Philip Shields	461	8.4	NEW
Liberal Democrats	Dean Malpass	235	4.3	NEW
Liberal Democrats	Anita Prabhakar	166	3.0	NEW
Turnout		5,485	30.3	
Registered electors		18,124		
Mansfield Independent hold		Swing		
Mansfield Independent hold		Swing		

==== West Mansfield ====
There were minor changes to the boundaries of the division.

West Mansfield (2 seats)
Party	Candidate	Votes	%	±%
Labour	Paul Henshaw	2,124	46.1	▲+3.7
Labour	Diana Meale (inc)	2,110	45.8	▲+5.0
Conservative	Stephen Stewardson	1,474	32.0	▲+24.6
UKIP	Stephen Crosby	1,116	24.2	▲+4.8
UKIP	Fran Loi	745	16.2	▼−1.0
Liberal Democrats	Rebecca Buck	416	9.0	NEW
TUSC	Paul Tooley-Okonkwo	156	3.4	NEW
Turnout		4,611	27.1	
Registered electors		17,037		
Labour hold		Swing		
Labour hold		Swing		

==== Warsop ====
Warsop (1 seat)
Party	Candidate	Votes	%	±%
Labour	Andy Wetton	1,665	64.5	▲+0.9
Conservative	Don Brown	566	21.9	▲+14.9
UKIP	Allan Dallman	282	10.9	▼−5.6
Liberal Democrats	Janette Smith	69	2.7	NEW
Turnout		2,582	27.1	
Registered electors		9,523		
Labour hold		Swing		

=== Newark & Sherwood District ===
(10 seats, 10 electoral divisions)

Newark & Sherwood District
Party	Candidates						Votes		
Party	Stood	Elected	Gained	Unseated	Net	% of total	%	No.	Net %
Conservative	10	6	Steady	Steady	Steady		55.3	17,918	▲19.2
Labour	9	3	Steady	Steady	Steady		25.9	8,390	▼3.8
Independent	3	1	Steady	Steady	Steady		9.4	3,047	▲1.0
Liberal Democrats	8	0	Steady	Steady	Steady		8.7	2,826	Steady
Green	1	0	Steady	Steady	Steady		0.8	250	Steady

Newark & Sherwood Turnout
Registered electors	88,805
Votes cast	32,431
Turnout	36.5% (▲+1.5)

==== Balderton ====
Division boundaries underwent significant changes compared with the boundaries used at the previous election.

Balderton (1 seat)
Party	Candidate	Votes	%
Conservative	Keith Walker (inc)	1,467	70.2
Labour	Vivienne Leach	445	21.3
Liberal Democrats	Marylyn Rayner	178	8.5
Turnout		2,090	28.4
Registered electors		7,379	
Conservative win (new boundaries)			

==== Blidworth ====
Blidworth (1 seat)
Party	Candidate	Votes	%	±%
Labour	Yvonne Woodhead (inc)	1,006	41.9	▼−12.6
Conservative	Bill Turnbull	909	37.8	NEW
Independent	Chris Wharton	416	17.3	NEW
Liberal Democrats	Philip Smith	71	3.0	NEW
Turnout		2,402	28.9	
Registered electors		8,319		
Labour hold		Swing		

==== Collingham ====
Division boundaries underwent significant changes compared with the boundaries used at the previous election.

Collingham (1 seat)
Party	Candidate	Votes	%
Independent	Maureen Dobson (inc)	2,191	62.1
Conservative	Johno Lee	1,339	37.9
Turnout		3,530	36.8
Registered electors		9,666	
Independent win (new boundaries)			

==== Farndon & Trent ====
Farndon & Trent (1 seat)
Party	Candidate	Votes	%
Conservative	Sue Saddington (inc)	2,008	64.3
Independent	Declan Patrick Logue	440	14.1
Labour	Mary Obodo	372	11.9
Liberal Democrats	Chris Adams	303	9.7
Turnout		3,123	42.5
Registered electors		7,366	
Conservative win (new seat)			

==== Muskham & Farnsfield ====
Muskham & Farnsfield (1 seat)
Party	Candidate	Votes	%
Conservative	Bruce Laughton (inc)*	3,108	69.0
Labour	Jeremy Paul Spry	770	17.1
Liberal Democrats	Peter Harris	377	8.4
Green	Richard Pain	250	5.5
Turnout		4,505	43.4
Registered electors		10,385	
Conservative win (new seat)			

* Incumbent councillor for Southwell and Caunton division prior to boundary changes.

==== Newark East ====
Division boundaries underwent significant changes compared with the boundaries used at the previous election.

Newark East (1 seat)
Party	Candidate	Votes	%
Conservative	Stuart Robert Wallace (inc)	1,586	64.0
Labour	Paul Stephen Peacock	671	27.1
Liberal Democrats	Vivien Helen Scorer	222	9.0
Turnout		2,479	31.9
Registered electors		7,787	
Conservative win (new boundaries)			

==== Newark West ====
Division boundaries underwent significant changes compared with the boundaries used at the previous election.

Newark West (1 seat)
Party	Candidate	Votes	%
Conservative	Keith Frank Girling	1,412	60.2
Labour	Zena Sanigar	933	39.8
Turnout		2,345	27.0
Registered electors		8,743	
Conservative win (new boundaries)			

==== Ollerton ====
Division boundaries underwent significant changes compared with the boundaries used at the previous election.

Ollerton (1 seat)
Party	Candidate	Votes	%
Labour	Mike Pringle	1,940	54.6
Conservative	Glenn John Alexander Bardill	1,484	41.8
Liberal Democrats	Christopher Cooke	126	3.5
Turnout		3,550	37.1
Registered electors		9,599	
Labour win (new boundaries)			

==== Sherwood Forest ====
Sherwood Forest (1 seat)
Party	Candidate	Votes	%
Labour	John Malcolm Peck (inc)*	1,738	53.5
Conservative	Michael Andrew Brown	1,397	43.0
Liberal Democrats	Peter James Scorer	112	3.4
Turnout		3,247	36.3
Registered electors		8,974	
Labour win (new seat)			

* Incumbent councillor for Rufford division prior to boundary changes.

==== Southwell ====
Southwell (1 seat)
Party	Candidate	Votes	%
Conservative	Roger James Jackson (inc)*	3,208	62.2
Liberal Democrats	Stuart Ross Thompstone	1,437	27.8
Labour	Ed Lyons	515	10.0
Turnout		5,160	48.9
Registered electors		10,587	
Conservative win (new seat)			

* Incumbent councillor for Farnsfield and Lowdham division prior to boundary changes.

=== Rushcliffe Borough ===
(10 seats, 9 electoral divisions)

Rushcliffe Borough
Party	Candidates						Votes		
Party	Stood	Elected	Gained	Unseated	Net	% of total	%	No.	Net %
Conservative	10	9	2	Steady	▲2		53.6	22,785	▲11.8
Labour	10	1	Steady	1	▼1		25.5	10,829	▼1.2
Liberal Democrats	8	0	Steady	Steady	Steady		10.9	4,628	▲1.4
Green	8	0	Steady	Steady	Steady		5.6	2,393	▼1.5
Independent	2	0	Steady	Steady	Steady		3.6	1,539	Steady
UKIP	2	0	Steady	Steady	Steady		0.9	360	▼14.2

Rushcliffe Turnout
Registered electors	85,786
Votes cast	36,848
Turnout	43.0% (▲+5.6)

==== Bingham East ====
Bingham East (1 seat)
Party	Candidate	Votes	%
Conservative	Francis Anthoney Purdue-Horan	2,294	54.9
Independent	Tracey Lindsay Kerry	922	22.1
Labour	Chris Grocock	595	14.3
Green	Ian Richard Mumford	190	4.6
UKIP	Brian Ralph Edward Weaver	174	4.2
Turnout		4,175	45.2
Registered electors		9,246	
Conservative win (new seat)			

==== Bingham West ====
Bingham West (1 seat)
Party	Candidate	Votes	%
Conservative	Jonathan Neil Clarke	1,390	55.3
Independent	Alan Robert Harvey	617	24.6
Labour	Tony Wallace	506	20.1
Turnout		2,513	37.2
Registered electors		6,765	
Conservative win (new seat)			

==== Cotgrave ====
Division boundaries underwent significant changes compared with the boundaries used at the previous election.

Cotgrave (1 seat)
Party	Candidate	Votes	%
Conservative	Richard Langton Butler (inc)	1,961	61.9
Labour	Keri Tricia Howe	892	28.2
Liberal Democrats	David John Allen	313	9.9
Turnout		3,166	38.0
Registered electors		8,358	
Conservative win (new boundaries)			

==== Keyworth ====
Division boundaries underwent significant changes compared with the boundaries used at the previous election.

Keyworth (1 seat)
Party	Candidate	Votes	%
Conservative	John Elliott Cottee (inc)	2,520	62.0
Liberal Democrats	Linda Jane Abbey	760	18.7
Labour	Kevin James Fitzgerald	473	11.6
UKIP	David Alan King	186	4.6
Green	David Anthony Nicholson-Cole	125	3.1
Turnout		4,064	46.7
Registered electors		8,728	
Conservative win (new boundaries)			

==== Leake & Ruddington ====
Leake & Ruddington (2 seats)
Party	Candidate	Votes	%
Conservative	Andy Brown (inc)*	3,433	55.4
Conservative	Reg Adair (inc)	3,349	54.1
Labour	Jill Maureen Reedman	1,206	19.5
Labour	Yvonne Barbara Lishman	1,202	19.4
Liberal Democrats	Jason Richard Billin	1,030	16.6
Liberal Democrats	Debbie Boote	676	10.9
Green	Stephen Richard Perriman	544	8.8
Green	Ian Paul Wilson	447	7.2
Turnout		6,201	39.3
Registered electors		15,772	
Conservative win (new seat)			
Conservative win (new seat)			

* Incumbent councillor for Soar Valley division prior to boundary changes.

==== Radcliffe On Trent ====
Division boundaries underwent significant changes compared with the boundaries used at the previous election.

Radcliffe On Trent (1 seat)
Party	Candidate	Votes	%
Conservative	Kay Cutts (inc)	2,220	57.8
Labour	Stuart James Brady	1,151	30.0
Liberal Democrats	Juliette Khan	262	6.8
Green	Darren James Wells	205	5.3
Turnout		3,838	45.0
Registered electors		8,553	
Conservative win (new boundaries)			

==== West Bridgford North ====
West Bridgford North (1 seat)
Party	Candidate	Votes	%
Labour	Liz Plant (inc)*	2,368	50.5
Conservative	Mike Watkinson	1,474	31.5
Green	Timothy Andrew Baker	441	9.4
Liberal Democrats	Vicky Price	402	8.6
Turnout		4,685	47.2
Registered electors		9,957	
Labour win (new seat)			

* Incumbent councillor for West Bridgford Central and South division prior to boundary changes.

==== West Bridgford South ====
West Bridgford South (1 seat)
Party	Candidate	Votes	%
Conservative	Jonathan Wheeler	1,893	50.3
Labour	Lizzie Edgerton	1,043	27.7
Liberal Democrats	David Charles Turner	592	15.7
Green	Ian James Whitehead	239	6.3
Turnout		3,767	43.3
Registered electors		8,713	
Conservative win (new seat)			

==== West Bridgford West ====
Division boundaries underwent significant changes compared with the boundaries used at the previous election.

West Bridgford West (1 seat)
Party	Candidate	Votes	%
Conservative	Gordon Wheeler (inc)	2,251	50.7
Labour	Nadia Whittome	1,393	31.4
Liberal Democrats	Ian Munro	593	13.4
Green	Will Richardson	202	4.6
Turnout		4,439	45.9
Registered electors		9,694	
Conservative win (new boundaries)			
