= 2023 Mansfield District Council election =

2023 English local election

- 4 May 2023

All 36 seats to Mansfield District Council 19 seats needed for a majority

	First party	Second party
Leader	Andy Abrahams	Mick Barton
Party	Labour	Mansfield Ind.
Last election	15	13
Seats before	14	13
Seats after	25	4
Seat change	▲10	▼9
Popular vote	9,587	5,534
Percentage	43.0%	24.8%
	Third party	Fourth party
Leader	Robert Elliman
Party	Conservative	Independent
Last election	2	6
Seats before	2	7
Seats after	5	2
Seat change	▲3	▼4
Popular vote	5,404	1,522
Percentage	22.4%	6.8%
- Results by ward (Labour in red, Conservatives in blue, Mansfield Independents in dark grey, and independents in light grey)
Mayor before election
Andy Abrahams
Labour
No overall control
Mayor after election
Andy Abrahams
Labour

The 2023 Mansfield District Council election took place on 4 May 2023, to elect all 36 members of Mansfield District Council in England and the directly-elected Mayor of Mansfield. This was on the same day as the 2023 local elections in England.

The council was under no overall control prior to the election, with Labour being the largest party and Labour's Andy Abrahams serving as mayor. At the 2023 elections, Abrahams was re-elected as mayor and Labour won a majority of the seats on the council.

== Background ==
Mansfield is one of the seven non-metropolitan districts within the area administered by Nottinghamshire County Council. Labour controlled Mansfield from its creation in 1973 until 2003. In that election, the Mansfield Independent Forum won a majority of seats, and controlled the council until 2011, when Labour regained control. They held the council until 2019, when the council fell into no overall control. In that election, Labour won 15 seats with 34.3% of the vote, the Mansfield Independents won 13 with 34.6%, independents won 6 with 7.5%, and the Conservatives won 2 with 21.3%. The Labour candidate also won the mayoral election, taking 50.01% once second preferences had been allocated.

New ward boundaries were drawn up for this election, although the number of seats on the council remained 36 (excluding the mayor's seat). The wards of Abbott, Broomhill, Bull Farm and Pleasley Hill, Holly, Kingsway, Ladybrook, Maun Valley, Newgate, Newlands, Peafields, Portland, Ransom Wood, Sandhurst, Woodhouse, and Woodlands have been abolished, and the wards of Bancroft, Central, Holly Forest Town, Kingsway Forest Town, Maun Valley Forest Town, Mill Lane, Newlands Forest Town, Pleasley, Rock Hill, Rufford, Southwell, Thompsons, Vale, Wainwright, and West Bank have been created.

== Previous council composition ==
After 2019 election		Before 2023 election	
Party	Seats	Party	Seats
Labour	15	Labour	14
Mansfield Independent	13	Mansfield Independent	13
Independent	6	Independent	7
Conservative	2	Conservative	2

=== Changes ===
- Amanda Fisher leaves Labour to sit as an independent
- May 2019: Andy Abrahams (Labour) does not take seat due to election as Mayor of Mansfield; by-election held in June 2019
- June 2019: Dave Saunders (Mansfield Independent Forum) wins by-election
- March 2021: Lee Anderson (Conservative) resigns; by-election held in May 2021
- May 2021: Robert Elliman (Conservative) wins by-election
- June 2022: Vaughan Hopewell (Mansfield Independent Forum) dies; by-election held in September 2022
- September 2022: Paul Henshaw (Labour) wins by-election

== Results summary ==
2023 Mansfield District Council
Party	Candidates	Seats	Gains	Losses	Net gain/loss	Seats %	Votes %	Votes	+/−
Labour	36	25	11	0	▲11	69.4	43.0	9,587	+8.7
Conservative	35	5	6	1	▲3	13.9	22.4	5,404	+1.4
Mansfield Independent	34	4	0	14	▼9	11.1	24.8	5,534	-9.8
Independent	6	2	0	4	▼5	5.6	6.8	1,522	-0.7
Green	4	0	0	0	Steady	0.0	0.5	149	New
TUSC	10	0	0	0	Steady	0.0	0.5	114	New
Reform	1	0	0	0	Steady	0.0	0.1	28	New

== Ward results ==
An asterisk denotes an incumbent councillor.

=== Bancroft ===
Bancroft
Party	Candidate	Votes	%	±%
Labour	Sue Swinscoe*	286	60.0	N/A
Mansfield Independent	Mandy Jackson	95	19.9	N/A
Conservative	Robert Learmonth	84	17.6	N/A
TUSC	Denis Tooley-Okonkwo	12	2.5	N/A
Turnout		477		
Majority		191	40.0	
Labour win (new seat)				

=== Berry Hill ===
Berry Hill
Party	Candidate	Votes	%	±%
Conservative	Andre Camilleri	457	50.7	+22.4
Mansfield Independent	Stephen Bodle*	231	25.6	−32.5
Labour	Michelle Laing	214	23.7	+12.9
Turnout		902		
Majority		226	25.1	
Conservative gain from Mansfield Independent		Swing		

=== Brick Kiln ===
Brick Kiln
Party	Candidate	Votes	%	±%
Labour	Terry Clay*	306	63.0	+14.1
Conservative	Faith Bekis	92	18.9	+6.3
Mansfield Independent	Ben Hollywood	75	15.4	−5.9
TUSC	Deb Hodson	13	2.7	+2.7
Turnout		486		
Majority		214	44.0	
Labour hold		Swing		

=== Carr Bank ===
Carr Bank
Party	Candidate	Votes	%	±%
Labour	Michael Abbs	206	45.5	
Mansfield Independent	Stuart Wallace*	175	38.6	
Conservative	Kelvin Peters	72	15.9	
Turnout				
Labour gain from Mansfield Independent		Swing		

=== Central ===
Central
Party	Candidate	Votes	%	±%
Labour	Charles Hammersley	235	55.8	
Mansfield Independent	Andy Johnson	98	23.3	
Conservative	Charles Anderson	70	16.6	
TUSC	Paul Tooley-Okonkwo	18	4.3	
Turnout				

=== Eakring ===
Eakring
Party	Candidate	Votes	%	±%
Labour	John Metcalfe	257	41.6	
Conservative	Joshua Charles	189	30.6	
Mansfield Independent	Stewart Rickersey	172	27.8	
Turnout				

=== Grange Farm ===
Grange Farm
Party	Candidate	Votes	%	±%
Independent	June Stendall*	467	55.0	
Labour	Leah Hartshorn	210	24.7	
Conservative	John Roughton	157	18.5	
TUSC	Il-Suna Sato	15	1.8	
Turnout				

=== Holly Forest Town ===
Holly Forest Town
Party	Candidate	Votes	%	±%
Mansfield Independent	Martin Wright*	439	62.3	
Labour	Donna Thomas	165	23.4	
Conservative	Bo Hitchmough	90	12.8	
TUSC	Shelly Burnett	11	1.6	
Turnout				

=== Hornby ===
Hornby
Party	Candidate	Votes	%	±%
Labour	Anne Callaghan	316	45.1	
Conservative	Vic Bobo	208	29.7	
Mansfield Independent	Ruth Ford	176	25.1	
Turnout				

=== Kings Walk ===
Kings Walk
Party	Candidate	Votes	%	±%
Conservative	Liz Langrick	218	36.1	
Labour	Rouchelle Evans	211	34.9	
Mansfield Independent	Kev Brown*	109	18.0	
Independent	Stephen Harvey	66	10.9	
Turnout				
Conservative gain from Mansfield Independent		Swing		

=== Kingsway Forest Town ===
Kingsway Forest Town
Party	Candidate	Votes	%	±%
Labour	Angie Jackson	301	43.9	
Conservative	Robert Corden	234	34.1	
Mansfield Independent	Gio Loperfido	151	22.0	
Turnout				

=== Lindhurst ===
Lindhurst
Party	Candidate	Votes	%	±%
Labour	Rich Mitchell-Tempest	281	57.8	
Conservative	Neil Smith	127	26.1	
Mansfield Independent	Tom Birchall	78	16.0	
Turnout				

=== Ling Forest ===
Ling Forest
Party	Candidate	Votes	%	±%
Conservative	Nigel Moxon	223	35.6	
Mansfield Independent	Bill Drewett*	215	34.3	
Labour	Zoe Lawrence-Newton	181	28.9	
TUSC	Andrea Dickens	7	1.1	
Turnout				

=== Manor ===
Manor
Party	Candidate	Votes	%	±%
Labour	Craig Whitby*	368	51.3	+16.2
Conservative	Paul Lawrence	212	29.5	−3.9
Mansfield Independent	Jayne Riddin	138	19.2	−12.3
Turnout		718	29.1	
Majority		156	21.7	+20
Labour hold		Swing		

=== Market Warsop ===
Leamington
Party	Candidate	Votes	%	±%
Labour	Jack Stephenson	222	44.0	
Independent	Debra Barlow*	172	34.1	
Conservative	Rita Townsend	55	10.9	
Mansfield Independent	Joe Johnson	50	9.9	
TUSC	Ruth Truswell	6	1.2	
Turnout				
Labour gain from Independent		Swing		

=== Maun Valley Forest Town ===
Maun Valley Forest Town
Party	Candidate	Votes	%	±%
Mansfield Independent	Mick Barton*	425	54.4	
Labour	Shane Draper	207	26.5	
Conservative	Keith Townsend	137	17.5	
TUSC	Karen Seymour	12	1.5	
Turnout				

=== Meden ===
Meden
Party	Candidate	Votes	%	±%
Labour	Andy Wetton*	433	61.9	
Conservative	Grant Bembridge	166	23.7	
Mansfield Independent	Denise Answer	101	14.4	
Turnout				

=== Mill Lane ===
Mill Lane
Party	Candidate	Votes	%	±%
Labour	Caroline Ellis	287	46.7	
Mansfield Independent	Andrea Russell	189	30.8	
Conservative	Shirley Peters	138	22.5	
Turnout				

=== Netherfield ===
Netherfield
Party	Candidate	Votes	%	±%
Labour	David Hughes	298	54.3	
Independent	Philip Shields*	135	24.6	
Conservative	Timothy Bower	116	21.1	
Turnout				
Labour gain from Independent		Swing		

=== Newlands Forest Town ===
Newlands Forest Town
Party	Candidate	Votes	%	±%
Mansfield Independent	Sid Walker*	210	44.1	
Labour	Andrew Shooter	158	33.2	
Conservative	Pippa Clements	108	22.7	
Turnout				

=== Oak Tree ===
Oak Tree
Party	Candidate	Votes	%	±%
Labour	Paul Henshaw*	186	42.0	
Conservative	Nick Marks	149	33.6	
Mansfield Independent	Gemma Canlin	105	23.7	
TUSC	Milo Tooley-Okonkwo	3	0.7	
Turnout				

=== Oakham ===
Oakham
Party	Candidate	Votes	%	±%
Labour	Stephen North	357	44.5	
Conservative	Robert Elliman*	309	38.5	
Mansfield Independent	Craig Sims	136	17.0	
Turnout				
Labour gain from Conservative		Swing		

=== Park Hall ===
Park Hall
Party	Candidate	Votes	%	±%
Labour	Jacob Denness	299	41.8	
Conservative	Alice Kurylo	212	29.7	
Mansfield Independent	Dean Ellis	204	28.5	
Turnout				

=== Penniment ===
Penniment
Party	Candidate	Votes	%	±%
Labour	Stuart Richardson*	313	46.7	
Mansfield Independent	David Smith*	253	37.8	
Conservative	Michael Shilladay	87	13.0	
TUSC	Adam Brailsford	17	2.5	
Turnout				
Labour gain from Mansfield Independent		Swing		

=== Pleasley ===
Pleasley
Party	Candidate	Votes	%	±%
Labour	Sharron Hartshorn	200	48.9	
Conservative	Jak Shuttleworth	82	20.0	
Mansfield Independent	Brian Wheatcroft	74	18.1	
Green	Chris Clarke	53	13.0	
Turnout				

=== Racecourse ===
Racecourse
Party	Candidate	Votes	%	±%
Independent	Steve Garner*	405	57.6	
Labour	Rob Kinton	196	27.9	
Mansfield Independent	Vicki Wright	102	14.5	
Turnout				

=== Rock Hill ===
Rock Hill
Party	Candidate	Votes	%	±%
Labour	Diana McKenzie	212	43.4	
Independent	Mark Garner	163	33.3	
Mansfield Independent	Shaun Anthoney	57	11.7	
Conservative	Julie Robinson	57	11.7	
Turnout				

=== Rufford ===
Rufford
Party	Candidate	Votes	%	±%
Mansfield Independent	Barry Answer*	266	38.8	
Labour	Garry Cole	264	38.5	
Conservative	Gareth Corden	130	19.0	
Green	Shaun Thornton	26	3.8	
Turnout				

=== Sherwood ===
Sherwood
Party	Candidate	Votes	%	±%
Labour Co-op	Alan Bell	279	47.6	
Mansfield Independent	Teresa Hanstock*	193	32.9	
Conservative	Emma Camina	114	19.5	
Turnout				
Labour gain from Mansfield Independent		Swing		

=== Southwell ===
Southwell
Party	Candidate	Votes	%	±%
Labour	Charlotte Inkle	265	58.4	
Conservative	Elliott Brown	105	23.1	
Mansfield Independent	Craig Vernon	84	18.5	
Turnout				

=== Thompsons ===
Thompsons
Party	Candidate	Votes	%	±%
Conservative	Sinead Anderson*	348	37.5	
Mansfield Independent	Roger Sutcliffe*	327	35.2	
Labour	Dennis Robinson	253	27.3	
Turnout				
Conservative gain from Mansfield Independent		Swing		

=== Vale ===
Vale
Party	Candidate	Votes	%	±%
Labour	Jane Beachus	303	55.0	
Mansfield Independent	Wendy Cook	146	26.5	
Conservative	Michelle Swain	83	15.1	
Green	Gill Maharjan	19	3.4	
Turnout				

=== Wainwright ===
Wainwright
Party	Candidate	Votes	%	±%
Labour	Lynn Henshaw	280	56.7	
Mansfield Independent	Ian Sheppard	115	23.3	
Conservative	Beverley Smith	99	20.0	
Turnout				

=== Warsop Carrs ===
Warsop Carrs
Party	Candidate	Votes	%	±%
Labour	Andy Burgin*	491	72.3	
Conservative	Barbara Henson	110	16.2	
Mansfield Independent	Ben Bonser	57	8.4	
Green	Robyn Hendley	21	3.1	
Turnout				

=== West Bank ===
West Bank
Party	Candidate	Votes	%	±%
Conservative	Ben Brown	240	36.7	
Labour	Sally Higgins	208	31.8	
Mansfield Independent	Faz Choudhury	178	27.2	
Reform	Tony Jones	28	4.3	
Turnout				

=== Yeoman Hill ===
Yeoman Hill
Party	Candidate	Votes	%	±%
Labour	John Coxhead*	339	59.0	
Conservative	Andy Tyler	126	21.9	
Mansfield Independent	Stuart Butler	110	19.1	
Turnout				

== Changes 2023-2027 ==
=== By-elections ===
==== West Bank ====
West Bank: 20 June 2024
Party	Candidate	Votes	%	±%
Labour	Garry Cole	169	38.4	+6.6
Mansfield Ind.	Faz Choudhury	142	32.3	+5.1
Conservative	Steve Walmsley	98	22.3	–14.4
Green	Shaun Thornton	14	3.2	N/A
Liberal Democrats	Thorsten Altenkirch	10	2.3	N/A
TUSC	Karen Seymour	7	1.6	N/A
Majority		27	6.1	
Turnout		440	20.1	
Registered electors		2,195		
Labour gain from Conservative		Swing	▲0.8	
