= 2013 Nottinghamshire County Council election =

2013 UK local government election

- 2 May 2013

All 67 seats to Nottinghamshire County Council 34 seats needed for a majority
- Turnout: 33.2% (▼-5.7%)
	First party	Second party	Third party
Party	Labour	Conservative	Liberal Democrats
Last election	13	35	9
Seats won	34	21	8
Seat change	▲+21	▼-14	▼-1
Popular vote	71,510	54,879	21,475
Percentage	35.1%	26.9%	10.5%
Swing	▲+11.5%	▼-12.5%	▼-8.0%
- Map showing the results of the 2013 Nottinghamshire County Council election.
Council control before election
Conservative
Council control after election
Labour

The 2013 Nottinghamshire County Council Election took place on 2 May 2013 as part of the 2013 United Kingdom local elections.

The Labour Party won a narrow majority of one seat, gaining overall control from the Conservative Party who had controlled the council since the 2009 election. The Labour Party won 34 seats, an increase of 21 seats compared with the previous election. The Conservative Party lost 14 seats and the Mansfield Independent Forum and the Liberal Democrats also suffered losses. UKIP lost their single seat despite a significant increase in vote share.

== Background ==
67 councillors were elected from 54 electoral divisions, which returned either one or two county councillors each by first-past-the-post voting for a four-year term of office.

In the previous election in 2009, held during the peak of the unpopularity of the then Labour government, the Conservative Party gained control of the council for the first time since 1977, albeit with a slim majority. The Liberal Democrats, Independents and the Mansfield Independent Forum all made gains at the expense of the Labour Party.

By-elections held between 2009 and 2013 indicated an increase in support for Labour, who gained seats in Mansfield South, Worksop West, and Rufford.

== Overall election results ==
Political composition of the council following the election

Overall Turnout
Registered electors	604,256
Votes cast	200,700
Turnout	33.2% (▼-5.7)

2013 Nottinghamshire County Council election
Party	Candidates	Seats	Gains	Losses	Net gain/loss	Seats %	Votes %	Votes	+/−
Labour	67	34	21	0	▲+21		35.1	71,510	▲+11.5
Conservative	61	21	0	14	▼-14		26.9	54,879	▼-12.5
Liberal Democrats	53	8	0	1	▼-1		10.5	21,475	▼-8.0
Independent	14	2	1	2	▼-1		4.6	9,410	▼-0.1
Mansfield Independent	6	2	0	4	▼-4		2.7	5,522	▼-0.6
UKIP	61	0	0	1	▼-1		18.1	36,878	▲+14.2
Green	19	0	0	0	Steady		1.8	3,621	▼-0.7
TUSC	3	0	0	0	Steady		0.2	370	New
BNP	2	0	0	0	Steady		0.1	135	▼-3.3

== Results by electoral division ==
=== Ashfield District ===
(10 seats, 8 electoral divisions)

Ashfield District
Party	Candidates						Votes		
Party	Stood	Elected	Gained	Unseated	Net	% of total	%	No.	Net %
Labour	10	6	4	0	▲+4		38.6	11,153	▲+15.8
Liberal Democrats	9	3	0	1	▼-1		20.4	5,903	▼-3.1
Independent	5	1	0	0	Steady		12.5	3,616	▲+0.7
UKIP	6	0	0	1	▼-1		15.4	4,458	▲+7.8
Conservative	8	0	0	2	▼-2		12.1	3,487	▼-5.8
TUSC	1	0	0	0	Steady		0.5	158	NEW
Green	1	0	0	0	Steady		0.3	98	▼-0.7

Ashfield Turnout
Registered electors	91,107
Votes cast	28,605
Turnout	31.4% (▼-3.6)

==== Hucknall ====
Hucknall
Party	Candidate	Votes	%	±%
Labour	John Wilmott	3,173	38.7	▲+9.2
Labour	Alice Grice	2,990	36.4	▲+8.5
Labour	John Wilkinson	2,918	35.6	▲+8.3
UKIP	Tom Irvine (inc)	2,739	33.4	▲+2.0
UKIP	Alison Irvine	2,373	28.9	▲+14.0
Conservative	Mick Murphy (inc)	2,235	27.2	▼−6.0
UKIP	Carole Terzza	2,131	26.0	▲+11.2
Conservative	Kevin Rostance (inc)	2,127	25.9	▼−5.2
Conservative	Trevor Peat	1,797	21.9	▼−8.9
Liberal Democrats	Harry Toseland	260	3.2	▼−10.7
Liberal Democrats	Kenneth Cotham	250	3.0	▼−10.1
Liberal Democrats	Jan Smith	182	2.2	▼−8.7
TUSC	Cliff Smith	158	1.9	NEW
Turnout		8,206	33.3	▼−0.8
Registered electors		24,647		
Labour gain from Conservative		Swing		
Labour gain from UKIP		Swing		
Labour gain from Conservative		Swing		

==== Kirkby in Ashfield North ====
Kirkby in Ashfield North
Party	Candidate	Votes	%	±%
Labour	John Knight (inc)	1,456	63.4	▲+37.0
Independent	Madeliene Gibson	417	18.2	NEW
Liberal Democrats	Rebecca Mullaney	225	9.8	▼−3.1
Independent	Russell Wykes	199	8.7	NEW
Turnout		2,297	22.9	▼−8.4
Registered electors		10,049		
Labour hold		Swing		

==== Kirkby in Ashfield South ====
Kirkby in Ashfield South
Party	Candidate	Votes	%	±%
Liberal Democrats	Rachel Madden (inc)	1,798	42.8	▲+3.5
Labour	Linda Ward	1,326	31.5	▲+12.0
UKIP	Simon Ashcroft	731	17.4	NEW
Conservative	Deborah Mason	252	6.0	▼−7.8
Green	Mark Harrison	98	2.3	▼−3.5
Turnout		4,205	37.1	▼−3.3
Registered electors		11,329		
Liberal Democrats hold		Swing		

==== Selston ====
Selston
Party	Candidate	Votes	%	±%
Independent	Gail Turner (inc)	2,427	71.8	▲+35.1
Labour	Steve Mays	794	23.5	▲+10.7
Independent	John Turner	161	4.8	NEW
Turnout		3,411	33.8	▼−9.6
Registered electors		10,088		
Independent hold		Swing		

==== Sutton in Ashfield Central ====
Sutton in Ashfield Central
Party	Candidate	Votes	%	±%
Labour	David Kirkham	1,182	53.1	▲+27.3
UKIP	Ian Stoke	608	27.3	NEW
Conservative	Shaun Hartley	252	11.3	▼−2.9
Liberal Democrats	Michelle Gent (inc)	185	8.3	▼−21.3
Turnout		2,232	26.2	▼−5.1
Registered electors		8,511		
Labour gain from Liberal Democrats		Swing		

==== Sutton in Ashfield East ====
Sutton in Ashfield East
Party	Candidate	Votes	%	±%
Labour	Steve Carroll (inc)	1,441	69.0	▲+41.7
Conservative	Francis Purdue-Horan	363	17.4	▲+2.3
Liberal Democrats	Tom Harpham	285	13.6	▼−8.6
Turnout		2,126	23.1	▼−9.0
Registered electors		9,184		
Labour hold		Swing		

==== Sutton in Ashfield North ====
Sutton in Ashfield North
Party	Candidate	Votes	%	±%
Liberal Democrats	Jason Zadrozny (inc)	1,626	53.4	▲+15.7
Labour	Paul Roberts	881	28.9	▲+2.1
UKIP	Neil Stokes	380	12.5	NEW
Conservative	Brian Jarvis	160	5.3	▼−15.1
Turnout		3,056	36.6	▲+2.3
Registered electors		8,360		
Liberal Democrats hold		Swing		

==== Sutton in Ashfield West ====
Sutton in Ashfield West
Party	Candidate	Votes	%	±%
Liberal Democrats	Tom Hollis	1,524	49.8	▲+10.7
Labour	Natalie Fleet	900	29.4	▲+1.6
Independent	Anna-Marie Wilson	412	13.5	NEW
Conservative	Paul Saxelby	225	7.4	▼−11.7
Turnout		3,072	34.4	▲+1.4
Registered electors		8,939		
Liberal Democrats hold		Swing		

=== Bassetlaw District ===
9 seats, 9 electoral divisions

Bassetlaw District
Party	Candidates						Votes		
Party	Stood	Elected	Gained	Unseated	Net	% of total	%	No.	Net %
Labour	9	7	3	0	▲+3		50.5	12,952	▲+12.2
Conservative	9	2	0	3	▼-3		27.8	7,130	▼-24.7
UKIP	8	0	0	0	Steady		18.3	4,705	NEW
Liberal Democrats	7	0	0	0	Steady		2.4	614	▼-4.1
Independent	1	0	0	0	Steady		1.0	266	▼-1.6

Bassetlaw Turnout
Registered electors	86,218
Votes cast	25,767
Turnout	29.9% (▼-5.8)

==== Blyth & Harworth ====
Blyth and Harworth
Party	Candidate	Votes	%	±%
Labour	Sheila Place (inc)	1,667	65.1	▲+12.4
UKIP	Roger Vernon	447	17.4	NEW
Conservative	Annette Simpson	363	14.2	▼−33.1
Liberal Democrats	Peter Thompson	85	3.3	NEW
Turnout		2,575	27.0	▼−7.1
Registered electors		9,530		
Labour hold		Swing		

==== Misterton ====
Misterton
Party	Candidate	Votes	%	±%
Conservative	Liz Yates (inc)	1,633	50.5	▼−26.0
Labour	David Challinor	827	25.6	▲+2.1
UKIP	Deidre Vernon	670	20.7	NEW
Liberal Democrats	Ilana Duveen	103	3.2	NEW
Turnout		3,242	30.2	▼−12.3
Registered electors		10,751		
Conservative hold		Swing		

==== Retford East ====
Retford East
Party	Candidate	Votes	%	±%
Labour	Pamela Skelding	1,360	46.8	▲+8.9
Conservative	Wendy Quigley (inc)	974	33.5	▼−28.6
UKIP	Phillip Hallam	481	16.6	NEW
Liberal Democrats	Mark Hunter	91	3.1	NEW
Turnout		2,922	32.9	▼−4.4
Registered electors		8,883		
Labour gain from Conservative		Swing		

==== Retford West ====
Retford West
Party	Candidate	Votes	%	±%
Labour	Ian Campbell	1,311	45.9	▲+12.5
Conservative	Michael Quigley (inc)	610	21.3	▼−25.0
UKIP	Jon Wade	599	21.0	NEW
Independent	James Napier	266	9.3	NEW
Liberal Democrats	Jennifer Coggles	72	2.5	▼−17.8
Turnout		2,860	33.8	▼−0.5
Registered electors		8,464		
Labour gain from Conservative		Swing		

==== Tuxford ====
Tuxford
Party	Candidate	Votes	%	±%
Conservative	John Ogle	1,851	60.0	▼−1.0
Labour	John Douglas	1,236	40.0	▲+23.1
Turnout		3,124	30.6	▼−10.1
Registered electors		10,215		
Conservative hold		Swing		

==== Worksop East ====
Worksop East
Party	Candidate	Votes	%	±%
Labour	Glynn Gilfoyle (inc)	1,815	68.8	▲+14.6
UKIP	Dave Scott	606	23.0	NEW
Conservative	Wayne Clarke	154	5.8	▼−12.9
Liberal Democrats	Carole Thompson	63	2.4	NEW
Turnout		2,632	27.7	▼−3.0
Registered electors		9,510		
Labour hold		Swing		

==== Worksop North ====
Worksop North
Party	Candidate	Votes	%	±%
Labour	Sybil Fielding (inc)	1,650	58.4	▲+3.9
UKIP	Ivor Jones	731	25.9	NEW
Conservative	Michael Gray	364	12.9	▼−32.6
Liberal Democrats	Helen Cooper	79	2.8	NEW
Turnout		2,831	26.1	▼−5.3
Registered electors		10,863		
Labour hold		Swing		

==== Worksop North East & Carlton ====
Worksop North East & Carlton
Party	Candidate	Votes	%	±%
Labour	Alan Rhodes (inc)	1,747	57.8	▲+6.7
UKIP	Tony Clayton	665	22.0	NEW
Conservative	Barry Bowles	610	20.2	▼−28.7
Turnout		3,031	32.9	▼−3.4
Registered electors		9,203		
Labour hold		Swing		

==== Worksop West ====
Worksop West
Party	Candidate	Votes	%	±%
Labour	Kevin Greaves (inc)*	1,339	52.8	▲+19.9
Conservative	Alec Thorpe	571	22.5	▼−28.3
UKIP	Mick Lowe	506	19.9	NEW
Liberal Democrats	Leon Duveen	121	4.8	▼−11.5
Turnout		2,550	29.0	▼−4.3
Registered electors		8,799		
Labour gain from Conservative		Swing		

* Incumbent following election at by-election, 16 September 2010

=== Broxtowe Borough ===
10 seats, 8 electoral divisions

Broxtowe District
Party	Candidates						Votes		
Party	Stood	Elected	Gained	Unseated	Net	% of total	%	No.	Net %
Liberal Democrats	9	5	0	0	Steady		21.8	7,006	▼-5.0
Conservative	10	4	0	1	▼-1		25.9	8,311	▼-9.5
Labour	10	1	1	0	▲+1		28.0	8,989	▲+8.9
UKIP	10	0	0	0	Steady		17.3	5,538	▲+12.8
Green	8	0	0	0	Steady		3.6	1,168	▼-1.3
Independent	1	0	0	0	Steady		3.0	955	▼-1.4
BNP	2	0	0	0	Steady		0.4	135	▼-4.5

Broxtowe Turnout
Registered electors	84,261
Votes cast	31,143
Turnout	37.0% (▼-8.3)

==== Beauvale ====
Beauvale
Party	Candidate	Votes	%	±%
Conservative	John Handley	1,050	34.8	▼−8.5
Labour	Edward Llewellyn-Jones	902	29.9	▲+11.5
UKIP	Vincent Gilbert	719	23.9	NEW
Liberal Democrats	Josie Forrest	163	5.4	▼−13.2
Green	Beth Hewis	101	3.4	NEW
BNP	David Wright	78	2.6	▼−17.1
Turnout		3,020	36.0	▼−7.6
Registered electors		8,400		
Conservative hold		Swing		

==== Beeston North ====
Beeston North
Party	Candidate	Votes	%	±%
Liberal Democrats	Steve Carr (inc)	1,606	46.9	▼−6.2
Labour	Mick Warner	1,053	30.8	▲+16.4
Conservative	Stephanie Kerry	313	9.1	▼−14.6
UKIP	Sarah Hillier	277	8.1	NEW
Green	Paul Anderson	172	5.0	▼−3.8
Turnout		3,429	43.7	▼−4.8
Registered electors		7,845		
Liberal Democrats hold		Swing		

==== Beeston South & Attenborough ====
Beeston South and Attenborough
Party	Candidate	Votes	%	±%
Labour	Kate Foale	1,394	39.0	▲+2.1
Conservative	Eric Kerry (inc)	1,265	35.4	▼−5.6
UKIP	Vid Auty	524	14.7	NEW
Green	Sylvia Rule	235	6.6	Steady
Liberal Democrats	Brian Taylor	154	4.3	▼−5.1
Turnout		3,587	38.9	▼−12.3
Registered electors		9,232		
Labour gain from Conservative		Swing		

==== Bramcote & Stapleford ====
Bramcote & Stapleford
Party	Candidate	Votes	%	±%
Liberal Democrats	Stan Heptinstall (inc)	1,857	30.2	▼−11.8
Liberal Democrats	Jacky Williams	1,489	24.2	▼−15.4
Labour	Gillian Yamin	1,407	22.9	▲+4.8
Conservative	Christopher Doddy	1,368	22.3	▼−10.1
Labour	Andrew Clayworth	1,344	21.9	▲+7.6
Conservative	David Park	1,197	19.5	▼−9.2
UKIP	Matthew Doar	1,156	18.8	NEW
UKIP	Chris Cobb	1,145	18.6	▲+5.8
Independent	Richard MacRae	955	15.6	NEW
Green	Gordon Stoner	243	4.0	▼−2.5
Green	Stuart Neyton	106	1.7	▼−3.3
Turnout		6,141	35.3	▼−10.2
Registered electors		17,372		
Liberal Democrats hold		Swing		
Liberal Democrats hold		Swing		

==== Chilwell & Toton ====
Chilwell & Toton
Party	Candidate	Votes	%	±%
Conservative	Richard Jackson (inc)	2,122	36.7	▼−12.9
Conservative	John Doddy (inc)*	2,116	36.6	▼−13.5
Labour	David Patrick	1,803	31.2	▲+9.9
Labour	Janet Pearce	1,578	27.3	▲+10.5
UKIP	Bob Heeley	1,205	20.9	NEW
UKIP	Keith Marriott	1,153	20.0	▲+8.4
Liberal Democrats	Barbara Carr	500	8.7	▼−7.2
Liberal Democrats	David Watts	473	8.2	▼−6.5
Green	Richard Eddleston	329	5.7	▼−4.0
Green	Mary Venning	255	4.4	▼−3.0
Turnout		5,776	35.8	▼−6.8
Registered electors		16,136		
Conservative hold		Swing		
Conservative hold		Swing		

* Incumbent following election at by-election, 15 March 2012

==== Eastwood ====
Eastwood
Party	Candidate	Votes	%	±%
Liberal Democrats	Keith Longdon (inc)	1,234	45.7	▼−4.0
Labour	Sue Bagshaw	834	30.9	▲+2.2
UKIP	Laurence Herniman	360	13.3	NEW
Conservative	Adrian Limb	214	7.9	▼−13.8
BNP	Alex McConnell	57	2.1	NEW
Turnout		2,704	32.4	▼−5.9
Registered electors		8,352		
Liberal Democrats hold		Swing		

==== Kimberley & Trowell ====
Kimberley & Trowell
Party	Candidate	Votes	%	±%
Liberal Democrats	Ken Rigby (inc)	1,492	41.7	▲+5.4
Labour	Helena Lings	787	22.0	▲+1.1
UKIP	Robert Davidson	736	20.6	NEW
Conservative	John Longdon	478	13.3	▼−17.4
Green	David Kirwan	88	2.5	▼−0.4
Turnout		3,589	40.1	▼−8.9
Registered electors		8,941		
Liberal Democrats hold		Swing		

==== Nuthall ====
Nuthall
Party	Candidate	Votes	%	±%
Conservative	Philip Owen (inc)	1,501	52.3	▲+2.1
Labour	Dawn Elliott	809	28.2	NEW
UKIP	Simon Rood	561	19.5	NEW
Turnout		2,897	36.3	▼−9.0
Registered electors		7,983		
Conservative hold		Swing		

=== Gedling Borough ===
10 seats, 6 electoral divisions

Gedling District
Party	Candidates						Votes		
Party	Stood	Elected	Gained	Unseated	Net	% of total	%	No.	Net %
Labour	10	8	5	0	▲+5		39.2	12,026	▲+9.8
Conservative	10	2	0	5	▼-5		30.4	9,323	▼-13.5
UKIP	10	0	0	0	Steady		22.5	6,915	▲+16.5
Liberal Democrats	10	0	0	0	Steady		5.7	1,747	▼-11.1
Green	4	0	0	0	Steady		1.3	388	NEW
Independent	1	0	0	0	Steady		0.7	217	NEW
TUSC	1	0	0	0	Steady		0.2	67	NEW

Gedling Turnout
Registered electors	88,968
Votes cast	30,314
Turnout	34.1% (▼-6.0)

==== Arnold North ====
Arnold North
Party	Candidate	Votes	%	±%
Labour	Pauline Allan	2,702	44.0	▲+15.0
Labour	Michael Payne	2,569	41.8	▲+15.5
Conservative	Carol Pepper (inc)	1,773	28.9	▼−18.5
Conservative	Julie Catkin	1,671	27.2	▼−21.5
UKIP	Colin Hart	1,411	23.0	NEW
UKIP	Christina Stala	1,187	19.3	NEW
Green	Jim Norris	218	3.5	NEW
Green	Margaret Vince	210	3.4	NEW
Liberal Democrats	Martin Smalley	178	2.9	▼−16.9
Liberal Democrats	Margaret Swift	144	2.3	▼−17.4
Turnout		6,142	32.7	▼−4.4
Registered electors		18,778		
Labour gain from Conservative		Swing		
Labour gain from Conservative		Swing		

==== Arnold South ====
Arnold South
Party	Candidate	Votes	%	±%
Labour	Roy Allan	2,941	41.5	▲+13.1
Labour	Muriel Weisz	2,840	40.1	▲+13.9
Conservative	Michael Adams	2,189	30.9	▼−10.9
Conservative	Suzanne Prew-Smith	2,012	28.4	▼−9.4
UKIP	Jane Marshall	1,681	23.7	▲+9.1
UKIP	Lee Waters	1,533	21.6	NEW
Liberal Democrats	Roger Patterson	307	4.3	▼−15.2
Liberal Democrats	Andrew Swift	293	4.1	▼−15.2
Turnout		7,083	37.7	▼−4.3
Registered electors		18,812		
Labour gain from Conservative		Swing		
Labour gain from Conservative		Swing		

==== Calverton ====
Calverton
Party	Candidate	Votes	%	±%
Conservative	Boyd Elliott	1,144	39.5	▼−31.0
Labour	Michael Hope	804	27.8	▼−1.7
UKIP	Wes Stala	666	23.0	NEW
Independent	John Wood	217	7.5	NEW
Liberal Democrats	John Flynn	63	2.2	NEW
Turnout		2,903	36.0	▼−4.7
Registered electors		8,060		
Conservative hold		Swing		

==== Carlton East ====
Carlton East
Party	Candidate	Votes	%	±%
Labour	John Clarke (inc)	2,225	39.2	▲+8.7
Labour	Nicki Brooks	2,093	36.9	▲+7.4
Conservative	Allen Clarke (inc)	1,494	26.3	▼−3.9
Conservative	Cheryl Clarke	1,343	23.7	▼−4.9
UKIP	Colin Blandamer	1,186	20.9	NEW
UKIP	Pat Blandamer	1,097	19.3	NEW
Liberal Democrats	Anne Wright	658	11.6	▼−16.0
Liberal Democrats	Andrew Ellwood	644	11.4	▼−14.1
Green	Nick Martin	170	3.0	NEW
Green	Jean Katimertzis	156	2.7	NEW
TUSC	Bill Buchanan	67	1.2	NEW
Turnout		5,673	32.4	▼−8.7
Registered electors		17,500		
Labour hold		Swing		
Labour gain from Conservative		Swing		

==== Carlton West ====
Carlton West
Party	Candidate	Votes	%	±%
Labour	Jim Creamer (inc)	2,704	49.2	▲+16.9
Labour	Darrell Pulk (inc)	2,588	47.1	▲+15.4
UKIP	Edmund Silverman	1,229	22.4	▲+8.0
UKIP	Nina Peterson-Tait	1,228	22.3	▲+8.0
Conservative	Robert Dawson	1,201	21.9	▼−8.0
Conservative	Tim White	1,030	18.7	▼−11.1
Liberal Democrats	Paul Hughes	449	8.2	▼−7.6
Liberal Democrats	Jason Stansfield	344	6.3	▼−8.4
Turnout		5,496	31.3	▼−7.5
Registered electors		17,564		
Labour hold		Swing		
Labour hold		Swing		

==== Newstead ====
Newstead
Party	Candidate	Votes	%	±%
Conservative	Christopher Barnfather (inc)	1,522	50.6	▼−23.2
UKIP	Mark Brinsley-Day	742	24.7	NEW
Labour	Linford Gibbons	650	21.6	▼−4.6
Liberal Democrats	Paul Buxton	92	3.1	NEW
Turnout		3,017	36.6	▼−6.0
Registered electors		8,254		
Conservative hold		Swing		

=== Mansfield District ===
9 seats, 5 electoral divisions

Mansfield District
Party	Candidates						Votes		
Party	Stood	Elected	Gained	Unseated	Net	% of total	%	No.	Net %
Labour	9	7	4	0	▲+4		39.6	9,572	▲+9.7
Mansfield Independent	6	2	0	4	▼-4		22.9	5,522	▼-7.6
UKIP	8	0	0	0	Steady		20.7	4,996	▲+15.4
Independent	3	0	0	0	Steady		7.7	1,857	NEW
Conservative	6	0	0	0	Steady		6.6	1,604	▼-16.6
Liberal Democrats	2	0	0	0	Steady		1.1	264	▼-8.1
Green	1	0	0	0	Steady		0.8	203	NEW
TUSC	1	0	0	0	Steady		0.6	145	NEW

Mansfield Turnout
Registered electors	81,624
Votes cast	22,556
Turnout	27.6% (▼-3.8)

==== Mansfield East ====
Mansfield East
Party	Candidate	Votes	%	±%
Labour	Alan Bell	1,801	36.0	▲+7.3
Labour	Colleen Harwood	1,631	32.6	▲+7.5
Mansfield Independent	Martin Wright (inc)	1,499	30.0	▼−3.2
Mansfield Independent	Bill Drewett	1,369	27.4	▼−5.9
UKIP	Andrea Hamilton	1,168	23.3	NEW
UKIP	Jason Pawlik	1,022	20.4	NEW
Conservative	Brian Marshall	507	10.1	▼−17.3
Conservative	Muriel Ragis	371	7.4	▼−14.8
Green	Mary Button	203	4.1	NEW
Turnout		5,003	27.5	▼−3.8
Registered electors		18,199		
Labour gain from Mansfield Independent		Swing		
Labour gain from Mansfield Independent		Swing		

==== Mansfield North ====
Mansfield North
Party	Candidate	Votes	%	±%
Labour	Joyce Bosnjak (inc)	2,443	50.5	▲+20.1
Labour	Parry Tsimbiridis (inc)	2,008	41.5	▲+15.7
UKIP	David Hamilton	1,584	32.7	▲+9.8
Mansfield Independent	Diane Etches	777	16.1	▼−1.8
Conservative	Stephanie Stewardson	586	12.1	▼−5.3
Conservative	Sasha Chmielewska	494	10.2	▼−5.5
Independent	Craig Eyre	290	6.0	NEW
Liberal Democrats	Anna Ellis	264	5.5	▼−7.6
Liberal Democrats	Nick Spencer	167	3.5	▼−7.7
TUSC	Karen Seymour	145	3.0	NEW
Turnout		4,840	26.8	▼−5.4
Registered electors		18,087		
Labour hold		Swing		
Labour hold		Swing		

==== Mansfield South ====
Mansfield South
Party	Candidate	Votes	%	±%
Mansfield Independent	Stephen Garner (inc)	2,940	51.7	▲+19.7
Mansfield Independent	Andy Sissons	2,543	44.7	▲+11.3
Labour	John Coxhead	1,851	32.6	▲+12.0
Labour	Chris Winterton (inc)*	1,764	31.0	▲+11.6
UKIP	Philip Moss	952	16.7	NEW
UKIP	John Pawlik	823	14.5	NEW
Turnout		5,684	29.2	▼−2.8
Registered electors		19,434		
Mansfield Independent hold		Swing		
Mansfield Independent hold		Swing		

* Incumbent following election at by-election, 25 February 2010

==== Mansfield West ====
Mansfield West
Party	Candidate	Votes	%	±%
Labour	Darren Langton	1,974	42.4	▲+12.8
Labour	Diana Meale	1,901	40.8	▲+11.4
Independent	June Stendall (inc)	1,567	33.6	▼−6.0
Independent	Barry Answer	1,262	27.1	▼−5.5
UKIP	Graham Roebuck	902	19.4	NEW
UKIP	Claude-Francois Loi	804	17.2	NEW
Conservative	Vic Bobo (inc)*	346	7.4	▼−9.9
Turnout		4,661	28.2	▼−2.0
Registered electors		16,540		
Labour gain from Mansfield Independent		Swing		
Labour gain from Mansfield Independent		Swing		

* Elected as Mansfield Independent in 2009

==== Warsop ====
Warsop
Party	Candidate	Votes	%	±%
Labour	John Allin (inc)	1,503	63.6	▲+15.1
UKIP	Peter Zinn	390	16.5	NEW
Mansfield Independent	Jeremy Regan	306	12.9	▼−11.0
Conservative	Michael Garner	165	7.0	▼−13.6
Turnout		2,368	25.3	▼−5.3
Registered electors		9,364		
Labour hold		Swing		

=== Newark & Sherwood District ===
10 seats, 10 electoral divisions

Newark and Sherwood District
Party	Candidates						Votes		
Party	Stood	Elected	Gained	Unseated	Net	% of total	%	No.	Net %
Conservative	9	6	0	1	▼-1		36.0	10,711	▼-16.1
Labour	10	3	2	0	▲+2		29.7	8,829	▲+11.5
Independent	3	1	1	2	▼-1		8.4	2,499	▼-2.9
UKIP	10	0	0	0	Steady		17.1	5,091	NEW
Liberal Democrats	7	0	0	0	Steady		8.7	2,591	▼-9.7

Newark & Sherwood Turnout
Registered electors	85,223
Votes cast	29,791
Turnout	35.0% (▼-4.2)

==== Balderton ====
Balderton
Party	Candidate	Votes	%	±%
Conservative	Keith Walker (inc)	884	42.1	▼−17.0
Labour	Andy Jee	537	25.6	▲+8.3
UKIP	Ken Browne	465	22.1	NEW
Liberal Democrats	Neil Allen	214	10.2	▼−13.4
Turnout		2,100	27.6	▼−3.8
Registered electors		7,615		
Conservative hold		Swing		

==== Blidworth ====
Blidworth
Party	Candidate	Votes	%	±%
Labour	Yvonne Woodhead	1,360	54.5	▲+21.9
Independent	Geoff Merry (inc)	653	26.2	▼−8.5
UKIP	Geoff Thorpe	481	19.3	NEW
Turnout		2,505	31.9	▼−0.8
Registered electors		7,863		
Labour gain from Independent		Swing		

==== Collingham ====
Collingham
Party	Candidate	Votes	%	±%
Independent	Maureen Dobson	1,237	36.8	NEW
Conservative	David Payne	936	27.9	▼−34.1
UKIP	Peter Wester-Davies	588	17.5	NEW
Labour	Daniel Hibberd	484	14.4	NEW
Liberal Democrats	Marilyn Rayner	115	3.4	▼−34.6
Turnout		3,370	35.8	▼−0.9
Registered electors		9,406		
Independent gain from Conservative		Swing		

==== Farndon & Muskham ====
Farndon & Muskham
Party	Candidate	Votes	%	±%
Conservative	Sue Saddington (inc)	1,519	54.9	▼−14.0
UKIP	Susan Wilkinson	645	23.3	NEW
Labour	Hugh Watt	408	14.7	▲+4.3
Liberal Democrats	Jim Gould	196	7.1	▼−13.7
Turnout		2,770	37.3	▼−10.3
Registered electors		7,435		
Conservative hold		Swing		

==== Farnsfield & Lowdham ====
Farnsfield and Lowdham
Party	Candidate	Votes	%	±%
Conservative	Roger Jackson	1,892	54.6	▼−24.5
Labour	Linda Tift	679	19.6	▼−1.3
UKIP	Steve Cook	605	17.5	NEW
Liberal Democrats	William Davison	288	8.3	NEW
Turnout		3,464	39.5	▼−10.6
Registered electors		8,770		
Conservative hold		Swing		

==== Newark East ====
Newark East
Party	Candidate	Votes	%	±%
Conservative	Stuart Wallace (inc)*	979	45.4	▼−6.2
Labour	Dennis Jones	651	30.2	▲+12.2
UKIP	Ian Robinson	396	18.4	NEW
Liberal Democrats	Ed Lowe	131	6.1	▼−24.3
Turnout		2,157	29.3	▼−2.2
Registered electors		7,369		
Conservative hold		Swing		

* Incumbent following election at by-election, 17 September 2009

==== Newark West ====
Newark West
Party	Candidate	Votes	%	±%
Conservative	Tony Roberts	694	29.0	▼−13.6
Labour	Trish Gurney	666	27.9	▲+8.3
Independent	Paul Baggaley	609	25.5	NEW
UKIP	Dieter Schanzer	354	14.8	NEW
Liberal Democrats	Chris Adams	68	2.8	▼−14.0
Turnout		2,400	32.6	▲+0.4
Registered electors		7,369		
Conservative hold		Swing		

==== Ollerton & Boughton ====
Ollerton & Boughton
Party	Candidate	Votes	%	±%
Labour	Stella Smedley (inc)	1,603	58.4	▲+17.8
Conservative	Matthew Riley	594	21.6	▼−13.6
UKIP	Margaret Hart	549	20.0	NEW
Turnout		2,755	30.5	▼−3.7
Registered electors		9,035		
Labour hold		Swing		

==== Rufford ====
Rufford
Party	Candidate	Votes	%	±%
Labour	John Peck (inc)*	2,008	58.2	▲+28.0
Conservative	Keith Benison	848	24.6	▼−9.6
UKIP	Rhea Charles	592	17.2	NEW
Turnout		3,465	33.2	▼−3.9
Registered electors		10,425		
Labour gain from Independent		Swing		

* Incumbent following election at by-election, 20 September 2012

==== Southwell & Caunton ====
Southwell & Caunton
Party	Candidate	Votes	%	±%
Conservative	Bruce Laughton (inc)	2,365	49.3	▼−2.8
Liberal Democrats	Peter Harris	1,579	32.9	▼−10.0
Labour	Dave Clark	433	9.0	▲+4.0
UKIP	Alison Schanzer	416	8.7	NEW
Turnout		4,805	48.4	▼−7.6
Registered electors		9,936		
Conservative hold		Swing		

=== Rushcliffe Borough ===
9 seats, 8 electoral divisions

Rushcliffe District
Party	Candidates						Votes		
Party	Stood	Elected	Gained	Unseated	Net	% of total	%	No.	Net %
Conservative	9	7	0	2	▼-2		43.9	14,313	▼-5.9
Labour	9	2	2	0	▲+2		24.5	7,989	▲+10.6
UKIP	9	0	0	0	Steady		15.9	5,175	▲+12.3
Liberal Democrats	9	0	0	0	Steady		10.3	3,350	▼-11.1
Green	5	0	0	0	Steady		5.4	1,764	▼-2.4

Rushcliffe Turnout
Registered electors	86,855
Votes cast	32,524
Turnout	37.4% (▼-8.5)

==== Bingham ====
Bingham
Party	Candidate	Votes	%	±%
Conservative	Martin Suthers (inc)	1,522	41.8	▼−6.9
Labour	David Holmes	738	20.3	▲+10.4
Liberal Democrats	George Davidson	725	19.9	▼−9.2
UKIP	Daniel Stowell	656	18.0	NEW
Turnout		3,666	36.1	▼−7.8
Registered electors		10,142		
Conservative hold		Swing		

==== Cotgrave ====
Cotgrave
Party	Candidate	Votes	%	±%
Conservative	Richard Butler (inc)	1,330	46.2	▼−6.9
Labour	Craig Chewings	818	28.4	▲+13.1
UKIP	Rachel Wolfe	484	16.8	▲+6.0
Green	Helena Brumpton-Surgey	150	5.2	NEW
Liberal Democrats	Sue Hull	95	3.3	▼−8.1
Turnout		2,885	33.5	▼−6.7
Registered electors		8,605		
Conservative hold		Swing		

==== Keyworth ====
Keyworth
Party	Candidate	Votes	%	±%
Conservative	John Cottee (inc)	1,931	50.9	▼−5.2
Labour	Chris Kemp	584	15.4	▲+9.5
Liberal Democrats	Debbie Boote	565	14.9	▼−14.8
UKIP	Dave King	535	14.1	NEW
Green	Tony Latham	179	4.7	▼−3.7
Turnout		3,814	44.4	▼−8.8
Registered electors		8,593		
Conservative hold		Swing		

==== Radcliffe on Trent ====
Radcliffe on Trent
Party	Candidate	Votes	%	±%
Conservative	Kay Cutts (inc)	2,073	53.2	▼−5.6
Labour	James Gibson	849	21.8	▲+4.9
UKIP	Scott Carlton	712	18.3	NEW
Liberal Democrats	Barbara Venes	259	6.7	▼−6.5
Turnout		3,919	39.6	▼−8.7
Registered electors		9,887		
Conservative hold		Swing		

==== Ruddington ====
Ruddington
Party	Candidate	Votes	%	±%
Conservative	Reg Adair (inc)	1,529	45.2	▼−3.5
Labour	David Crosby	716	21.2	▲+11.0
UKIP	Peter Wolfe	651	19.2	▲+9.1
Liberal Democrats	Peter McGowan	486	14.4	▼−10.5
Turnout		3,400	37.6	▼−8.0
Registered electors		9,033		
Conservative hold		Swing		

==== Soar Valley ====
Soar Valley
Party	Candidate	Votes	%	±%
Conservative	Andrew Brown	1,698	50.1	▼−9.5
UKIP	David Lee	711	21.0	NEW
Labour	Steve Collins	700	20.7	▲+1.4
Liberal Democrats	Linda Abbey	278	8.2	▼−12.9
Turnout		3,415	35.1	▼−10.7
Registered electors		9,736		
Conservative hold		Swing		

==== West Bridgford Central & South ====
West Bridgford Central and South
Party	Candidate	Votes	%	±%
Labour	Steve Calvert	2,679	35.6	▲+17.7
Labour	Liz Plant	2,583	34.3	▲+16.6
Conservative	Barrie Cooper (inc)	2,574	34.2	▼−4.4
Conservative	Gordon Moore	2,231	29.6	▼−9.3
Green	Sue Mallender	1,156	15.3	▼−5.0
Green	Richard Mallender	1,054	14.0	▼−4.3
UKIP	John Foden	928	12.3	▲+5.2
UKIP	Pat Wolfe	772	10.2	NEW
Liberal Democrats	Keith Jamieson	408	5.4	▼−8.5
Liberal Democrats	Juliette Khan	390	5.2	▼−8.6
Turnout		7,535	36.2	▼−7.1
Registered electors		20,839		
Labour gain from Conservative		Swing		
Labour gain from Conservative		Swing		

==== West Bridgford West ====
West Bridgford West
Party	Candidate	Votes	%	±%
Conservative	Gordon Wheeler (inc)	1,656	42.8	▼−1.8
Labour	Laurence Turner	905	23.4	▲+12.3
Liberal Democrats	Rod Jones	534	13.8	▼−18.7
UKIP	Matthew Faithfull	498	12.9	NEW
Green	Jerome Baddley	279	7.2	▲+0.9
Turnout		3,890	38.8	▼−11.5
Registered electors		10,020		
Conservative hold		Swing		

== By-Elections between May 2013 – May 2017 ==
By-elections are called when a representative Councillor resigns or dies, so are unpredictable. A by-election is held to fill a political office that has become vacant between the scheduled elections.

=== Ollerton – 18 December 2014 ===
Ollerton By-Election 18 December 2014
Party	Candidate	Votes	%	±%
Labour	Michael Pringle (E)	1,171	56.4	−2.0
Conservative	Ben Bradley (politician)	533	25.7	+4.1
UKIP	Colin Hart	347	16.7	−3.3
Liberal Democrats	Marylyn Rayner	24	1.2	+1.2
Majority				
Turnout				
Labour hold		Swing		

=== Selston – 24 November 2015 ===
Selston By-Election 24 November 2015
Party	Candidate	Votes	%	±%
Selston Parish Independents	David Barnard Martin	2,054	59.2	-12.5
Independent	Sam Wilson	794	22.9	+22.9
Labour	Mike Hollis	355	10.2	−13.2
UKIP	Ray Young	161	4.6	+4.6
Conservative	Paul James Baxelby	103	3.0	+3.0
Majority				
Turnout				
Selston Parish Independents hold		Swing		

== Notes and references ==
Notes
