= 2015 Mansfield District Council election =

2015 UK local government election

← 2011	7 May 2015	2019 →

All 36 seats to Mansfield District Council 19 seats needed for a majority
	First party	Second party	Third party
	Lab	MIF	UKIP
Leader	Sonya Ward	Kate Allsop	Barry Answer
Party	Labour	Mansfield Independent Forum	UKIP
Leader's seat	Bull Farm and Pleasely Hill	Mayor	Abbott
Last election	24	10	0
Seats won	19	15	2
Seat change	▼7	▲5	▲2
Popular vote	20,493	16,119	3,204
Percentage	47.9%	37.7%	7.5%
Swing	▲0.1%	▲2.0%	▲6.2%
- Map of the results (Labour in red, Mansfield Independent Forum in dark grey, UKIP in purple)
Council control before election
Labour
Council control after election
No overall control

The 2015 Mansfield District Council election took place on 7 May 2015 to elect members of Mansfield District Council in England. This was on the same day as other local elections.

== Council composition ==
As of November 2018, there are 17 Mansfield Independent Forum councilors, 17 Labour councillors, 2 Mansfield South Independent and 1 Conservative Party councilor. As such, the Mansfield Independent Forum have a majority of 1 seat on the council.

== Overall election results ==
=== Mansfield District Council (summary of overall results) ===
- 1 Mayor elected, Mansfield Independent Forum
- 19 Labour Councillors
- 16 Mansfield Independent Forum Councillors
- 2 UKIP Councillors

Mansfield District 2015 election results
Party	Seats	Gains	Losses	Net gain/loss	Seats %	Votes %	Votes	+/−
Labour	19	1	8	▼7	52.8	47.9	20,493	+0.1
Mansfield Independent	15	6	1	▲5	41.7	37.7	16,119	+2.0
UKIP	2	2	0	▲2	5.6	7.5	3,204	+6.2
Independent	0	0	0	Steady	0.0	4	1,362	
Conservative	0	0	0	Steady	0.0		1,259	
Green	0	0	0	Steady	0.0		207	
TUSC	0	0	0	Steady	0.0		120	

== Results by ward ==
=== Abbott ===
Abbott
Party	Candidate	Votes	%	
UKIP	Barry Answer	705	53	
Labour	Donna Thomas	626	47	
Turnout		1331	62.2	
Majority		79	6	N/A
UKIP gain from Labour		Swing	N/A	

=== Berry Hill ===
Berry Hill
Party	Candidate	Votes	%	
Mansfield Independent	Andrew Tristram	876	54	
Conservative	Clair Brown	503	31	
Labour	Mike Abbs	245	15	
Turnout		1624	73	
Majority		373	23	N/A
Mansfield Independent hold		Swing	N/A	

=== Brick Kiln ===
Brick Kiln
Party	Candidate	Votes	%	
Labour	Terry Clay	712	56	
Mansfield Independent	Michelle Witham	559	44	
Turnout		1271	56.7	
Majority		163	12	N/A
Labour hold		Swing	N/A	

=== Broomhill ===
Broomhill
Party	Candidate	Votes	%	
Mansfield Independent	Ian Sheppard	543	51.9	
Labour	Denis O'Neill	504	48.1	
Turnout		1047	46.2	
Majority		39	3.8	N/A
Mansfield Independent gain from Labour		Swing	N/A	

=== Bull Farm & Pleasley Hill ===
Bull Farm & Pleasley Hill
Party	Candidate	Votes	%	
Labour	Sonya Ward	550	41.3	
Independent	Mick Colley	422	31.7	
UKIP	Samuel Kulasingham	357	27	
Turnout		1329	56.4	
Majority		128	23	N/A
Labour hold		Swing	N/A	

=== Carr Bank ===
Carr Bank
Party	Candidate	Votes	%	
Mansfield Independent	Stuart Wallace	576	53.6	
Labour	John Coxhead	500	46.4	
Turnout		1076	56.6	
Majority		76	7.2	N/A
Mansfield Independent hold		Swing	N/A	

=== Eakring ===
Eakring
Party	Candidate	Votes	%	
Mansfield Independent	Stewart Rickersey	902	62	
Labour	Samantha Hartshorn	552	38	
Turnout		1454	68.1	
Majority		350	24	N/A
Mansfield Independent gain from Labour		Swing	N/A	

=== Grange Farm ===
Grange Farm
Party	Candidate	Votes	%	
Mansfield Independent	Ron Jelley	685	45.2	
Independent	June Stendall	461	30.4	
Labour	Stuart Moody	370	24.4	
Turnout		1516	64.5	
Majority		224	14.8	N/A
Mansfield Independent hold		Swing	N/A	

=== Holly ===
Holly
Party	Candidate	Votes	%	
Mansfield Independent	Martin Wright	979	66	
Labour	Mark Fretwell	505	34	
Turnout		1484	61.6	
Majority		474	32	N/A
Mansfield Independent hold		Swing	N/A	

=== Hornby ===
Hornby
Party	Candidate	Votes	%	
Labour	Joyce Bosnjak	660	51	
UKIP	David Hamilton	599	46	
TUSC	Paul Tooley-Onkonkwo	34	3	
Turnout		1293	63	
Majority		61	5	N/A
Labour hold		Swing	N/A	

=== Kings Walk ===
Kings Walk
Party	Candidate	Votes	%	
Mansfield Independent	Stephen Harvey	707	56.5	
Labour	James Gibson	544	43.5	
Turnout		1251	57.8	
Majority		163	13	N/A
Mansfield Independent gain from Labour		Swing	N/A	

In May 2017, MDC Chairman, Councillor Stephen Harvey joined the Conservative Party and became the only Conservative member of the council

=== Kingsway ===
Kingsway
Party	Candidate	Votes	%	
Labour	Nick Bennett	523	41.6	
Mansfield Independent	Adrian Nita	364	28.9	
Conservative	Giovanni Loperfido	346	27.5	
Independent	Zenko Bilas	26	2	
Turnout		1259	59.6	
Majority		159	12.7	N/A
Labour hold		Swing	N/A	

=== Ladybrook ===
Ladybrook
Party	Candidate	Votes	%	
Labour	Sally Higgins	624	58	
Mansfield Independent	Karen Garner	397	37	
TUSC	Nathan Glyn Millership Sharpe	56	5	
Turnout		1077	46.2	
Majority		227	21	N/A
Labour hold		Swing	N/A	

=== Lindhurst ===
Lindhurst
Party	Candidate	Votes	%	
Mansfield Independent	Roger Sutcliffe	914	62	
Labour	Alan Spencer	351	24	
Green	Jon Leighton	207	14	
Turnout		1472	71.24	
Majority		563	38	N/A
Mansfield Independent hold		Swing	N/A	

=== Ling Forest ===
Ling Forest
Party	Candidate	Votes	%	
Mansfield Independent	Bill Drewett	909	63	
Labour	Charles Hammersley	538	37	
Turnout		1447	66.9	
Majority		371	26	N/A
Mansfield Independent gain from Labour		Swing	N/A	

=== Manor ===
Manor
Party	Candidate	Votes	%	±%
Labour	Katrina Atherton	uncontested		
Labour hold		Swing	N/A	

=== Market Warsop ===
Market Warsop
Party	Candidate	Votes	%	
Labour	John Kerr	785	63	
Mansfield Independent	Sam Roach	468	37	
Turnout		1253	52.9	
Majority		317	26	N/A
Labour hold		Swing	N/A	

=== Maun Valley ===
Maun Valley
Party	Candidate	Votes	%	
Mansfield Independent	Michael Barton	951	63	
Labour	Colin Clayton	561	37	
Turnout		1512	60	
Majority		390	26	N/A
Mansfield Independent hold		Swing	N/A	

=== Meden ===
Meden
Party	Candidate	Votes	%	
Labour	Andy Wetton	932	71	
Mansfield Independent	Darren Kirk	384	29	
Turnout		1316	61.5	
Majority		548	42	N/A
Labour hold		Swing	N/A	

=== Netherfield ===
Netherfield
Party	Candidate	Votes	%	
Labour	Sharon Adey	475	36	
Independent	Philip Shields	453	34	
UKIP	Andrea Hamilton	371	28	
TUSC	Karen Seymour	30	2	
Turnout		1329	66.3	
Majority		22	2	N/A
Labour gain from Mansfield Independent		Swing	N/A	

=== Newgate ===
Newgate
Party	Candidate	Votes	%	
Mansfield Independent	Andy Sissons	523	55	
Labour	Paul Henshaw	431	45	
Turnout		954	46.5	
Majority		92	10	N/A
Mansfield Independent gain from Labour		Swing	N/A	

=== Newlands ===
Newlands
Party	Candidate	Votes	%	
UKIP	Sid Walker	679	53	
Labour	Anna Drozdz	615	48	
Turnout		1294	54	
Majority		64	5	N/A
UKIP gain from Labour		Swing	N/A	

=== Oakham ===
Oakham
Party	Candidate	Votes	%	
Mansfield Independent	Kevin Brown	452	34.6	
Labour	Denise Moody	441	33.85	
Conservative	Stephanie Stewardson	410	31.45	
Turnout		1303	69.6	
Majority		11	0.75	N/A
Mansfield Independent hold		Swing	N/A	

=== Oak Tree ===
Oak Tree
Party	Candidate	Votes	%	
Labour	Vaughan Hopewell	552	61	
Mansfield Independent	Darren Bacon	351	39	
Turnout		903	45.7	
Majority		199	22	N/A
Labour hold		Swing	N/A	

=== Park Hall ===
Park Hall
Party	Candidate	Votes	%	
Labour	Ann Norman	820	62	
UKIP	John Pawlik	493	38	
Turnout		1313	55.9	
Majority		327	24	N/A
Labour hold		Swing	N/A	

=== Peafields ===
Peafields
Party	Candidate	Votes	%	±%
Labour	Lesley Wright	704	51	▲12.4
Mansfield Independent	Lee Palmer	677	49	▲19.1
Turnout		1381	61	
Majority		27	2	▼4
Labour hold		Swing	N/A	

=== Penniment ===
Penniment
Party	Candidate	Votes	%	
Labour	Stuart Richardson	716	61	
Mansfield Independent	Paul Watkins	454	39	
Turnout		1170	54.8	
Majority		262	22	N/A
Labour hold		Swing	N/A	

=== Portland ===
Portland
Party	Candidate	Votes	%	
Labour	Brian Lohan	429	62	
Mansfield Independent	Maria Gibson	261	38	
Turnout		690	24	
Majority		168	26	N/A
Labour hold		Swing	N/A	

=== Racecourse ===
Racecourse
Party	Candidate	Votes	%	
Mansfield Independent	Steve Garner	821	66	
Labour	Chris Winterton	416	34	
Turnout		1237	58.3	
Majority		396	32	N/A
Mansfield Independent hold		Swing	N/A	

=== Ransom Wood ===
Ransom Wood
Party	Candidate	Votes	%	
Labour	John Smart	638	57	
UKIP	Paul Hollingworth	484	43	
Turnout		1122	53.6	
Majority		154	14	N/A
Labour hold		Swing	N/A	

=== Sandhurst ===
Sandhurst
Party	Candidate	Votes	%	
Mansfield Independent	Dave Saunders	716	57	
Labour	Adrian Harpham	528	43	
Turnout		1244	57.2	
Majority		188	14	N/A
Mansfield Independent gain from Labour		Swing	N/A	

=== Sherwood ===
Sherwood
Party	Candidate	Votes	%	
Labour	Sean McCallum	595	52	
Mansfield Independent	Paul Piercy	532	48	
Turnout		1127	58.9	
Majority		63	4	N/A
Labour hold		Swing	N/A	

=== Warsop Carrs ===
Warsop Carrs
Party	Candidate	Votes	%	
Labour	Peter Crawford	1,069	73	
Mansfield Independent	Foysal Choudhury	391	27	
Turnout		1460	58.3	
Majority		678	46	N/A
Labour hold		Swing	N/A	

=== Woodhouse ===
Woodhouse
Party	Candidate	Votes	%	
Labour	Amanda Fisher	840	66	
Mansfield Independent	Linda Davidson	421	34	
Turnout		1261	52.8	
Majority		419	32	N/A
Labour hold		Swing	N/A	

=== Woodlands ===
Woodlands
Party	Candidate	Votes	%	
Mansfield Independent	David Smith	569	57	
Labour	Christopher Revill	421	43	
Turnout		990	56.2	
Majority		148	14	N/A
Mansfield Independent hold		Swing	N/A	

=== Yeoman Hill ===
Yeoman Hill
Party	Candidate	Votes	%	
Labour	Lee Probert	721	50.1	
Mansfield Independent	Neil Williams	716	49.9	
Turnout		1437	56.1	
Majority		5	0.2	N/A
Labour hold		Swing	N/A	

== Changes between 2015 and 2019 ==
Yeoman Hill By-Election 8 September 2016
Party	Candidate	Votes	%	±%
Labour	John Coxhead	278	45.7	▼4.5
Mansfield Independent	Neil Williams	148	24.3	▼25.5
UKIP	David Hamilton	105	17.3	▲17.3
Conservative	Daniel Redfern	41	6.7	▲6.7
Independent	Phil Shields	36	5.9	▲5.9
Majority		130	21.3	▲21.1
Turnout		608	23.5	
Labour hold		Swing		

Warsop Carrs By-Election 24 November 2016
Party	Candidate	Votes	%	±%
Labour	Andrew Burgin	285	47.9	▼25.3
Independent	Debra Barlow	211	35.5	▲35.5
UKIP	Raymond Forster	74	12.4	▲12.4
Conservative	Daniel Redfern	25	4.2	▲4.2
Majority		74	12.4	▼33.6
Turnout		595	22.2	▼36.1
Labour hold		Swing		
