= 2019 Mansfield District Council election =

2019 UK local government election

← 2015	2 May 2019	2023 →

All 36 seats to Mansfield District Council 19 seats needed for a majority
	First party	Second party	Third party
Party	Labour	Mansfield Independent Forum	Independent
Last election	18	16	0
Seats before	17	19	0
Seats won	15	13	6
Seat change	-2	-3	+6
Popular vote	8,155	8,245	1,789
Percentage	34.3%	34.6%	7.5%
Swing	-13.6%	-3.1%	+3.5%
	Fourth party	Fifth party	Sixth party
Party	Conservative	UKIP	Liberal Democrats
Last election	0	2	New Party
Seats before	1	0	0
Seats won	2	0	0
Seat change	+1	-2	0
Popular vote	5,062	540	16
Percentage	21.3%	2.3%	0.1%
Swing	+18.3%	-5.2%	+0.1%
- Map of the results (Labour in red, Mansfield Independent Forum in dark grey, independents in light grey, Conservatives in blue)
Council control before election
No overall control
Council control after election
No overall control

The 2019 Mansfield District Council election took place on 2 May 2019, to elect all 36 seats to the Mansfield District Council in Nottinghamshire, England. It was prior to the election run by the Mansfield Independent Forum.

== Election results ==
As of January 2020 the council composition is:

Labour Party (UK): 14 Mansfield Independent Forum: 14 Independent (politician): 6 Conservative Party UK: 2

== Results by ward ==
=== Abbott ===
Answer was elected as a UKIP councillor in 2015 before rejoining the Mansfield Independent Forum.

Abbott
Party	Candidate	Votes	%	±%
Mansfield Independent	Barry Answer	481	61.8	N/A
Labour	Chris Clarke	205	26.3	−20.7
Conservative	Jamie Hemmings	92	11.8	N/A
Turnout				
Majority		276	35.5	N/A
Mansfield Independent gain from UKIP		Swing	N/A	

=== Berry Hill ===
Berry Hill
Party	Candidate	Votes	%	±%
Mansfield Independent	Andrew Tristram	630	58.1	+4.1
Conservative	Cathryn Fletcher	307	28.3	−2.7
Labour	Mark Dobb	117	10.8	−4.2
Independent	Zenko Bilas	30	2.8	N/A
Turnout				
Majority		323	29.8	N/A
Mansfield Independent hold		Swing	N/A	

=== Brick Kiln ===
Brick Kiln
Party	Candidate	Votes	%	±%
Labour	Terry Clay	292	48.9	−7.1
Mansfield Independent	Lee Browne	127	21.3	−22.7
UKIP	Daniel Hartshorn	103	17.3	N/A
Conservative	Anna Ellis	75	12.6	N/A
Turnout				
Majority		165	27.6	+15.6
Labour hold		Swing		

=== Broomhill ===
Broomhill
Party	Candidate	Votes	%	±%
Labour	Marion Bradshaw	242	50.2	+2.1
Mansfield Independent	Ian Sheppard	165	34.2	−17.7
Conservative	David Fell	75	15.6	N/A
Turnout				
Majority		77	16.0	N/A
Labour gain from Mansfield Independent		Swing	+9.9	

=== Bull Farm and Pleasley Hill ===
Bull Farm and Pleasley Hill
Party	Candidate	Votes	%	±%
Labour	Sonya Ward	378	51	+9.7
Mansfield Independent	Ellen Colley	175	23.6	−8.1
UKIP	Peter Holder	120	16.2	−10.8
Conservative	John Roughton	68	9.1	N/A
Turnout				
Majority		203	27.4	+4.4
Labour hold		Swing	+8.4	

=== Carr Bank and Ravensdale ===
Carr Bank and Ravensdale
Party	Candidate	Votes	%	±%
Mansfield Independent	Stuart Wallace	298	52.1	−1.5
Labour	Darren Hunt	189	33	−13.4
Conservative	Russell Talbot	85	14.9	N/A
Turnout				
Majority		108	29.1	N/A
Mansfield Independent hold		Swing	-8.2	

=== Eakring ===
Eakring
Party	Candidate	Votes	%	±%
Conservative	Sinead Anderson	343	40.7	N/A
Mansfield Independent	Stewart Rickersey	216	25.6	−36.4
Labour	Paul Bradshaw	187	22.2	−15.8
UKIP	Alexander Smith	96	11.4	N/A
Turnout				
Majority		127	15.1	N/A
Conservative gain from Mansfield Independent		Swing	N/A	

=== Grange Farm ===
Grange Farm
Party	Candidate	Votes	%	±%
Independent	June Stendall	277	33.9	+3.5
Conservative	Laura Hemmings	204	25.0	N/A
Mansfield Independent	Nick Bennett	179	21.9	N/A
Labour	Lesley Wright	156	19.1	−5.3
Turnout				
Majority		73	8.9	N/A
Independent gain from Mansfield Independent		Swing	+13.4	

=== Holly ===
Holly
Party	Candidate	Votes	%	±%
Mansfield Independent	Martin Wright	500	64.9	−1.1
Labour	Jacob Denness	150	19.5	−14.5
Conservative	Bo Hitchmough	120	15.6	N/A
Turnout				
Majority		350	45.4	+13.4
Mansfield Independent hold		Swing	-8.4	

=== Hornby ===
Hornby
Party	Candidate	Votes	%	±%
Mansfield Independent	Steve Bodle	280	43.6	N/A
Labour	Joyce Bosnjak	188	29.3	−21.7
Conservative	Ricky-Lee Cooke	174	27.1	N/A
Turnout				
Majority		98	14.3	N/A
Mansfield Independent gain from Labour		Swing	+32.7	

=== Kings Walk ===
Between 2017 and 2019 the former Mansfield Independent councillor sat as a Conservative.

Kings Walk
Party	Candidate	Votes	%	±%
Mansfield Independent	Ben Birchall	238	39.4	−17.1
Conservative	Hazel Webster	194	32.1	N/A
Labour	Shane Draper	172	28.5	−15.0
Turnout				
Majority		44	7.3	−5.6
Mansfield Independent hold		Swing	-24.6	

=== Kingsway ===
Kingsway
Party	Candidate	Votes	%	±%
Labour	Mark Fretwell	215	34.2	−7.4
Conservative	Kelvin Peters	140	22.3	−5.2
UKIP	Allan Dallman	140	22.3	N/A
Mansfield Independent	Gio Loperfido	133	21.2	−7.7
Turnout				
Majority		75	11.9	−0.8
Labour hold		Swing	-14.9	

=== Ladybrook ===
Ladybrook
Party	Candidate	Votes	%	±%
Labour	Sue Swinscoe	255	49.3	−8.7
Mansfield Independent	Denis O'Neil	173	33.5	−3.5
Conservative	Kevin Bradley	89	17.2	N/A
Turnout				
Majority		82	15.8	−5.2
Labour hold		Swing	-13.0	

=== Lindhurst ===
Lindhurst
Party	Candidate	Votes	%	±%
Mansfield Independent	Roger Sutcliffe	375	41.3	−20.7
Conservative	Rob Elliman	367	40.4	N/A
Labour	Anne Callaghan	166	18.3	−5.7
Turnout				
Majority		8	0.9	−37.1
Mansfield Independent hold		Swing	N/A	

=== Ling Forest ===
Ling Forest
Party	Candidate	Votes	%	±%
Mansfield Independent	Bill Drewett	253	38.6	−24.4
Conservative	Fiona Burke	204	31.1	N/A
Labour	Adrian Harpham	117	17.9	−19.1
UKIP	Colleen Smith	81	12.4	N/A
Turnout				
Majority		49	7.5	−18.5
Mansfield Independent hold		Swing	N/A	

=== Manor ===
In the 2015 elections, Manor ward went uncontested.

Manor
Party	Candidate	Votes	%	±%
Labour	Craig Whitby	289	35.1	N/A
Conservative	Bethan Eddy	275	33.4	N/A
Mansfield Independent	Damian Bennett	260	31.5	N/A
Turnout		824	35.7	
Majority		14	1.7	N/A
Labour hold		Swing	N/A	

=== Market Warsop ===
Market Warsop
Party	Candidate	Votes	%	±%
Independent	Debra Barlow	273	41.1	N/A
Labour	Louise Husband	218	32.8	−30.2
Mansfield Independent	Lol Brown	91	13.7	−24.3
Conservative	Kristyna Ellis	83	12.5	N/A
Turnout				
Majority		65	8.3	N/A
Independent gain from Labour		Swing	N/A	

=== Maun Valley ===
Maun Valley
Party	Candidate	Votes	%	±%
Mansfield Independent	Mick Barton	482	59	−4.0
Conservative	Rob Corden	179	21.9	N/A
Labour	Andy Chambers	156	19.1	−17.9
Turnout				
Majority		303	37.1	+11.1
Mansfield Independent hold		Swing	N/A	

=== Meden ===
Meden
Party	Candidate	Votes	%	±%
Labour	Andy Wetton	390	60.9	−10.1
Conservative	James Ellis	131	20.5	N/A
Mansfield Independent	Denise Answer	119	18.6	−10.4
Turnout				
Majority		259	40.4	−1.6
Labour hold		Swing	N/A	

=== Netherfield ===
Netherfield
Party	Candidate	Votes	%	±%
Independent	Phil Shields	323	54.1	+20.1
Labour	Michelle Swordy	149	25.0	−11.0
Conservative	James Thomas	97	16.2	N/A
Mansfield Independent	Ben Donald	28	4.7	N/A
Turnout				
Majority		164	29.1	N/A
Independent gain from Labour		Swing	N/A	

=== Newgate ===
Sissons was originally elected in 2015 for the Mansfield Independent Forum but defected in 2018 with Stephen Garner to sit as an Independent.

Newgate
Party	Candidate	Votes	%	±%
Independent	Andy Sissons	243	52.4	N/A
Labour	Steve Gapski	131	28.2	−16.8
Mansfield Independent	Tris Glenn	56	12.1	−42.9
Conservative	Richard Yates	34	7.2	N/A
Turnout				
Majority		112	24.2	N/A
Independent gain from Mansfield Independent		Swing	N/A	

=== Newlands ===
Newlands
Party	Candidate	Votes	%	±%
Mansfield Independent	Sid Walker	342	52.1	N/A
Labour	Clare Dobb	194	29.5	−18.5
Conservative	Jonathan Williams	121	18.4	N/A
Turnout				
Majority		148	22.6	N/A
Mansfield Independent gain from UKIP		Swing	N/A	

=== Oakham ===
Oakham
Party	Candidate	Votes	%	±%
Conservative	Lee Anderson	343	44.5	+13.0
Labour	Martin Lee	226	29.3	−4.6
Mansfield Independent	Kevin Brown	202	26.2	−8.4
Turnout				
Majority		137	15.2	N/A
Conservative gain from Mansfield Independent		Swing	+10.7	

=== Oak Tree ===
Hopewell was previously elected in 2011 and 2015 as the Labour councillor for the ward but later defected.

Oak Tree
Party	Candidate	Votes	%	±%
Mansfield Independent	Vaughan Hopewell	274	56.1	+17.1
Labour	Hayley Dallman	163	33.4	−27.6
Conservative	Janis Clarke	51	10.5	N/A
Turnout				
Majority		111	22.7	N/A
Mansfield Independent gain from Labour		Swing	+22.5	

=== Park Hall ===
Park Hall
Party	Candidate	Votes	%	±%
Labour	Ann Norman	256	42.5	−19.5
Mansfield Independent	Dean Ellis	243	40.3	N/A
Conservative	Victor Bobo	104	17.2	N/A
Turnout				
Majority		13	2.2	−21.8
Labour hold		Swing	N/A	

=== Peafields ===
Peafields
Party	Candidate	Votes	%	±%
Independent	Daniel Redfern	262	38.3	N/A
Labour	Julie Graves	211	30.8	−20.2
Conservative	Katerina Roberts	122	17.8	N/A
Mansfield Independent	Lee Palmer	89	13.0	−36.0
Turnout				
Majority		51	7.5	N/A
Independent gain from Labour		Swing	N/A	

=== Penniment ===
Penniment
Party	Candidate	Votes	%	±%
Labour	Stuart Richardson	304	48.8	−12.2
Mansfield Independent	Adrian Nita	226	36.3	−2.7
Conservative	Charlie Anderson	93	14.9	N/A
Turnout				
Majority		78	12.5	−9.5
Labour hold		Swing	N/A	

=== Portland ===
Portland
Party	Candidate	Votes	%	±%
Labour	Brian Lohan	204	52.2	−9.8
Mansfield Independent	Faz Choudhury	135	34.5	−3.5
Conservative	Shirley Peters	52	13.3	N/A
Turnout				
Majority		69	17.7	−6.3
Labour hold		Swing	N/A	

=== Racecourse ===
Garner was originally elected as Mansfield Independent Forum however later left the forum in 2018 to run for mayor as an independent.

Racecourse
Party	Candidate	Votes	%	±%
Independent	Stephen Garner	381	62.0	N/A
Labour	Chris Williams	125	20.4	−13.6
Mansfield Independent	Shaun Anthony	56	9.1	−55.9
Conservative	Ethan Burrell	52	8.5	N/A
Turnout				
Majority		256	41.6	N/A
Independent gain from Mansfield Independent		Swing	N/A	

=== Ransom Wood ===
Ransom Wood
Party	Candidate	Votes	%	±%
Labour	John Smart	222	41.6	−15.4
Mansfield Independent	Steve Ward	208	39.0	N/A
Conservative	Katharine Johnson	104	19.4	N/A
Turnout				
Majority		14	2.6	−11.4
Labour hold		Swing	N/A	

=== Sandhurst ===
Due to Andy Abrahams winning the Mayoral election, a by-election took place in Sandhurst on the 27th of June 2019. Dave Saunders went on to win the subsequent by-election.

Sandhurst
Party	Candidate	Votes	%	±%
Labour	Andy Abrahams	284	41.6	−1.4
Mansfield Independent	Dave Saunders	230	33.7	−23.3
Conservative	Helena Sale	152	22.3	N/A
Liberal Democrats	Andy Rimmer	16	2.4	N/A
Turnout				
Majority		54	7.9	N/A
Labour gain from Mansfield Independent		Swing	N/A	

=== Sherwood ===
Sherwood
Party	Candidate	Votes	%	±%
Mansfield Independent	Teresa Hanstock	225	39.3	−8.7
Labour	Paul Henshaw	223	39.0	−13.0
Conservative	Caroline Tapken	124	21.7	N/A
Turnout				
Majority		2	0.3	N/A
Mansfield Independent gain from Labour		Swing	N/A	

=== Warsop Carrs ===
Warsop Carrs
Party	Candidate	Votes	%	±%
Labour	Andy Burgin	500	65.5	−6.5
Mansfield Independent	Ben Hollywood	145	19.0	−8.0
Conservative	Marc Jones	118	15.5	N/A
Turnout				
Majority		355	46.5	+0.5
Labour hold		Swing	N/A	

=== Woodhouse ===
Woodhouse
Party	Candidate	Votes	%	±%
Labour	Amanda Fisher	374	59.3	−6.7
Mansfield Independent	Jayne Riddin	185	29.3	−4.7
Conservative	Stuart Hickmott	72	11.4	N/A
Turnout				
Majority		189	30.0	−2
Labour hold		Swing	N/A	

=== Woodlands ===
Woodlands
Party	Candidate	Votes	%	±%
Mansfield Independent	Dave Smith	232	41.2	−15.8
Labour	Sally Higgins	154	27.4	−15.6
Conservative	John Farnath	110	19.5	N/A
UKIP	Paul King	67	11.9	N/A
Turnout				
Majority		78	13.8	−0.2
Mansfield Independent hold		Swing	N/A	

=== Yeoman Hill ===
Yeoman Hill
Party	Candidate	Votes	%	±%
Labour	John Coxhead	353	53.9	+3.8
Mansfield Independent	Mark Russell	194	29.6	−20.3
Conservative	Nicholas Spencer	108	16.5	N/A
Turnout				
Majority		159	24.3	+24.1
Labour hold		Swing	+12.1	

== Changes between 2019 and 2023 ==
=== Sandhurst By-Election ===
Sandhurst By-Election 27 June 2019
Party	Candidate	Votes	%	±%
Mansfield Independent	Dave Saunders	227	42.7	+9.0
Labour	Michelle Swordy	177	33.3	−8.3
Conservative	Catherine Fletcher	71	13.4	−8.9
UKIP	Daniel Hartshorn	56	10.5	N/A
Turnout			24.63	
Majority		78	13.8	−0.2
Mansfield Independent gain from Labour		Swing	+8.7	
