= 2011 Mansfield District Council election =

District election in Nottinghamshire resulting in a Labour party win

← 2007	5 May 2011	2015 →

All 36 seats to Mansfield District Council 19 seats needed for a majority
	First party	Second party	Third party
	Lab	MIF	LD
Leader	Martin Lee	Tony Egginton	Phil Smith
Party	Labour	Mansfield Independent Forum	Liberal Democrats
Leader's seat	Eakring	Mayor	Hornby (defeated)
Last election	12	29	4
Seats won	24	10	0
Seat change	▲12	▼19	▼4
Popular vote	14,328	10,717	2,554
Percentage	47.8%	35.7%	8.5%
- Map of the results (Labour in red, Mansfield Independent Forum in dark grey)
Council control before election
Mansfield Independent Forum
Council control after election
Labour

The 2011 Mansfield District Council election took place on 5 May 2011 to elect members of Mansfield District Council in Nottinghamshire, England. The whole council was up for election as was the directly elected executive mayor.

The ward boundaries were reorganised, reducing the number of members from 46 (spread over the previous 19 wards) to 36 single-member wards. Re-aligning the wards by considering geographical area and housing density reflected a more-even number of voters per ward.

== Overall election results ==
=== Mansfield District Council (Summary of Overall Results) ===
- 1 Mayor elected, Mansfield Independent Forum
- 26 Labour Councillors
- 10 Mansfield Independent Forum Councillors

Mansfield District 2011 Election Results
Party	Seats	Gains	Losses	Net gain/loss	Seats %	Votes %	Votes	+/−
Labour	26							
Mansfield Independent	10							

== Mansfield District Council – Results by Ward ==
=== Abbott ===
Abbott (1 seat)
Party	Candidate	Votes	%
Labour	Sharron Adey (E)	418	41.1
Mansfield Independent Forum	Danny McCrossan	394	38.7
Conservative	Richard Stevens	149	14.7
Liberal Democrats	Anna Marie Ellis	56	5.5
Turnout			

=== Berry Hill ===
Berry Hill (1 seat)
Party	Candidate	Votes	%
Mansfield Independent Forum	Andrew Mark Tristram (E)	613	50.4
Conservative	Fraser McFarland	374	30.8
Labour	Kathryn Yemm	169	13.9
Liberal Democrats	William Kenneth Haywood	60	4.9
Turnout			

=== Brick Kiln ===
Brick Kiln (1 seat)
Party	Candidate	Votes	%
Labour	Terry Clay (E)	441	55.1
Mansfield Independent Forum	June Stendall	297	37.1
Liberal Democrats	Kristyna Adela Ellis	62	7.8
Turnout			

=== Broomhill ===
Broomhill (1 seat)
Party	Candidate	Votes	%
Labour	Denis O'Neill (E)	504	64.9
Mansfield Independent Forum	John Milnes	220	28.3
Liberal Democrats	Becki Heywood	53	6.8
Turnout			

=== Bull Farm ===
Bull Farm (1 seat)
Party	Candidate	Votes	%
Labour	Mick Colley (E)	539	65.5
Mansfield Independent Forum	Tom Jervis	252	27.9
Liberal Democrats	Andrew Placzek	60	6.6
Turnout			

=== Carr Bank ===
Carr Bank (1 seat)
Party	Candidate	Votes	%
Mansfield Independent Forum	Christine Joy Smith (E)	347	49.4
Labour	Chris Paul Winterton	320	45.6
Liberal Democrats	Laura Ann Goddard	35	5.0
Turnout			

=== Eakring ===
Eakring (1 seat)
Party	Candidate	Votes	%
Labour	Martin Kim Lee (E)	427	45.9
Mansfield Independent Forum	Bill Drewett	332	35.7
Conservative	Luke Colgan	134	14.4
Liberal Democrats	John Briggs	38	4.1
Turnout			

=== Grange Farm ===
Grange Farm (1 seat)
Party	Candidate	Votes	%
Mansfield Independent Forum	Ron Jelly (E)	634	62.0
Labour	Ralph Thomas Barker	234	22.9
Conservative	Liam McFarland	99	9.7
Liberal Democrats	James Robert Ellis	56	5.5
Turnout			

=== Holly ===
Holly (1 seat)
Party	Candidate	Votes	%
Mansfield Independent Forum	Martin Wright (E)	434	48.1
Labour	Darren Martin Langton	363	40.2
Liberal Democrats	Kyle Duncan	105	11.6
Turnout			

=== Hornby ===
Hornby (1 seat)
Party	Candidate	Votes	%
Labour	Joyce Bosnjak (E)	315	37.2
Liberal Democrats	Philp Ashley Smith	204	24.1
UKIP	Andrea Hamilton	178	21.0
Mansfield Independent Forum	Dave Vann	150	17.7
Turnout			

=== Kings Walk ===
Kings Walk (1 seat)
Party	Candidate	Votes	%
Labour	Colin Clayton (E)	210	33.4
Mansfield Independent Forum	Craig Eyre	171	27.2
Liberal Democrats	John Edward Barsby	131	20.9
Conservative	Vic Bobo	116	18.5
Turnout			

=== Kingsway ===
Kingsway (1 seat)
Party	Candidate	Votes	%
Labour	Nick Bennett (E)	430	52.6
Mansfield Independent Forum	Wayne Hough	202	24.7
Liberal Democrats	Gregory James Hall	67	8.2
Independent	Ann Carol Ward	64	7.8
Green	Mick Bull	55	6.7
Turnout			

=== Ladybrook ===
Ladybrook (1 seat)
Party	Candidate	Votes	%
Labour	Sally Anne Higgins (E)	497	64.7
Mansfield Independent Forum	David Brown	194	25.3
Liberal Democrats	Nicholas James Howard Spencer	77	10.0
Turnout			

=== Lindhurst ===
Lindhurst (1 seat)
Party	Candidate	Votes	%
Mansfield Independent Forum	Roger Sutcliffe (E)	436	38.9
Conservative	Drew Stafford	311	27.7
Labour	Paul Cullen	240	21.4
Green	Paul Frost	78	7.0
Liberal Democrats	Mark Jason Quick	57	5.1
Turnout			

=== Ling Forest ===
Ling Forest (1 seat)
Party	Candidate	Votes	%
Labour	Charles Ian Hammersley (E)	401	43.7
Mansfield Independent Forum	Alan Ronald Fell	266	29.0
Conservative	Kirsty Glasby	212	23.1
Liberal Democrats	Graham John Parmentor Hay	38	4.1
Turnout			

=== Manor ===
Manor (1 seat)
Party	Candidate	Votes	%
Labour	Katrina Atherton (E)	480	42.7
Mansfield Independent Forum	Ann Edwards	336	29.9
UKIP	David Hamilton	226	20.1
Liberal Democrats	Peter Cooke	81	7.2
Turnout			

=== Market Warsop ===
Market Warsop (1 seat)
Party	Candidate	Votes	%
Labour	John Kerr (E)	486	67.7
Mansfield Independent Forum	Jo Scully	197	27.4
Liberal Democrats	Rachael Louise Briggs	35	4.9
Turnout			

=== Maun Valley ===
Maun Valley (1 seat)
Party	Candidate	Votes	%
Mansfield Independent Forum	Mick Barton (E)	351	52.9
Labour	Kevin James Pieczka	313	47.1
Turnout			

=== Meden ===
Meden (1 seat)
Party	Candidate	Votes	%
Labour	Andy Wetton (E)	696	77.5
Mansfield Independent Forum	Paul James Piercy	153	17.1
Liberal Democrats	Thomas William Jennings	48	5.4
Turnout			

=== Netherfield ===
Netherfield (1 seat)
Party	Candidate	Votes	%
Mansfield Independent Forum	Derek John Evans (E)	444	50.5
Labour	David Charles Harrison	401	45.6
Liberal Democrats	Matthew James Dale	34	3.9
Turnout			

=== Newgate ===
Newgate (1 seat)
Party	Candidate	Votes	%
Labour	Paul Henshaw (E)	296	51.0
Mansfield Independent Forum	Andy Sissons	231	39.8
Conservative	Muriel Ragis	32	5.5
Liberal Democrats	John Charles Kingswood	21	3.6
Turnout			

=== Newlands ===
Newlands (1 seat)
Party	Candidate	Votes	%
Labour	Denise Frances Moody (E)	426	47.4
Mansfield Independent Forum	Richard Hallam	265	29.5
Conservative	Brian Marshall	150	16.7
Green	Mary Elizabeth Carr Button	35	3.9
Liberal Democrats	Liam Bootle	22	2.5
Turnout			

=== Oak Tree ===
Oak Tree (1 seat)
Party	Candidate	Votes	%
Labour	Vaughan Hopewell (E)	346	55.5
Mansfield Independent Forum	Bob Cross	138	22.2
Conservative	Tony McFarland	118	18.9
Liberal Democrats	Stuart Trevis Wilson	21	3.4
Turnout			

=== Oakham ===
Oakham (1 seat)
Party	Candidate	Votes	%
Mansfield Independent Forum	Kate Allsop (E)	444	48.6
Labour	John Edward Coxhead	403	44.1
Liberal Democrats	Vanessa Samantha Joanne Foale	66	7.2
Turnout			

=== Park Hall ===
Park Hall (1 seat)
Party	Candidate	Votes	%
Labour	Dorothy Beastall (E)	482	57.8
Mansfield Independent Forum	Linda Davidson	294	35.3
Liberal Democrats	Karen Louise Shacklock	58	7.0
Turnout			

=== Peafields ===
Peafields (1 seat)
Party	Candidate	Votes	%
Labour	Sonya Rose Ward (E)	347	38.6
Liberal Democrats	Veronica Moya Goddard	293	32.6
Mansfield Independent Forum	Denise Answer	260	29.9
Turnout			

=== Penniment ===
Penniment (1 seat)
Party	Candidate	Votes	%
Labour	Stuart Richardson (E)	486	56.6
Mansfield Independent Forum	Linda Margaret Wilkinson	322	37.5
Liberal Democrats	Ward Singlehurst	51	5.9
Turnout			

=== Portland ===
Portland (1 seat)
Party	Candidate	Votes	%
Labour	Brian Thomas Lohan (E)	298	61.3
Mansfield Independent Forum	Michael Anthony Abbs	115	23.7
Conservative	Phillip Edmund Moss	51	10.5
Liberal Democrats	Jamie Nicholas Spencer	22	4.5
Turnout			

=== Racecourse ===
Racecourse (1 seat)
Party	Candidate	Votes	%
Mansfield Independent Forum	Steve Garner (E)	533	61.1
Labour	Phil Oldknow	281	32.2
Liberal Democrats	Fiona Jane Hay	38	4.4
Independent	Martin William Ward	20	2.3
Turnout			

=== Ransom Wood ===
Ransom Wood (1 seat)
Party	Candidate	Votes	%
Labour	John Smart (E)	425	57.4
Liberal Democrats	Michael David Lowery	237	32.0
Mansfield Independent Forum	Keith Allsop	78	10.5
Turnout			

=== Sandhurst ===
Sandhurst (1 seat)
Party	Candidate	Votes	%
Labour	Adrian Harpham (E)	402	51.6
Mansfield Independent Forum	Eddie Smith	290	37.2
Liberal Democrats	Mark Roger Robinson	87	11.2
Turnout			

=== Sherwood ===
Sherwood (1 seat)
Party	Candidate	Votes	%
Labour	Julia Elizabeth Yemm (E)	427	57.6
Mansfield Independent Forum	Barry Michael Answer	274	36.9
Liberal Democrats	Tracy Marriott	40	5.4
Turnout			

=== Warsop Carrs ===
Warsop Carrs (1 seat)
Party	Candidate	Votes	%
Labour	Peter Crawford (E)	608	74.4
Mansfield Independent Forum	Stan Kurylo	152	18.6
Liberal Democrats	Stephanie Anigail Aguilera Flores	57	7.0
Turnout			

=== Woodhouse ===
Woodhouse (1 seat)
Party	Candidate	Votes	%
Labour	Amanda Fisher (E)	478	61.5
Mansfield Independent Forum	Stuart Noble	247	31.8
Liberal Democrats	Toni Loraine Hodgkins	52	6.7
Turnout			

=== Woodlands ===
Woodland (1 seat)
Party	Candidate	Votes	%
Mansfield Independent Forum	David Malcolm Smith (E)	392	52.5
Labour	Mutahear Chowdhury	270	36.2
Liberal Democrats	Marj Barnes	85	11.4
Turnout			

=== Yeoman Hill ===
Yeoman Hill (1 seat)
Party	Candidate	Votes	%
Labour	Philip Shields (E)	399	45.1
Mansfield Independent Forum	Mark Hibbert	259	29.3
Conservative	David Andreou	106	12.0
TUSC	Karen Seymour	61	6.9
Liberal Democrats	Alex Richard Weijers	59	6.7
Turnout			

== By-Elections between May 2011 – May 2015 ==
By-elections are called when a representative Councillor resigns or dies, so are unpredictable. A by-election is held to fill a political office that has become vacant between the scheduled elections.

=== Park Hall – 20 October 2011 ===
Park Hall by-election 20th October 2011
Party	Candidate	Votes	%	±%
Labour	Ann Norman (E)	416	53.1	−4.7
Mansfield Independent Forum	Linda Davidson	164	22.0	−13.3
Liberal Democrats	Mark Jason Quick	157	21.0	+14.0
UKIP	Andrea Hamilton	25	3.2	+3.2
Conservative	Fraser McFarland	20	2.7	+2.7
Majority				
Turnout				
Labour hold		Swing		

=== Netherfield – 4 December 2014 ===
Netherfield by-election 4 December 2014
Party	Candidate	Votes	%	±%
Labour	Lesley Sarah Wright (E)	347	57.7	+12.1
UKIP	Sid Walker	225	37.4	+37.4
TUSC	Karen Rachel Mary Seymour	29	4.9	+4.9
Majority				
Turnout			27.23	
Labour gain from Mansfield Independent		Swing		

== Mansfield Mayoral Election 5 May 2011 ==
Mansfield has a directly elected mayor.

Mansfield Mayoral Election 5th May 2011
Party	Candidate	1st round		2nd round			1st round votesTransfer votes, 2nd round
Party	Candidate	Total	Of round	Transfers	Total	Of round	1st round votesTransfer votes, 2nd round
Mansfield Independent	Tony Egginton	10,901	37.55%	1,779	12,680		
Labour	Stephen Yemm	11,732	40.42%	881	12,613		
UKIP	David Hamilton	2,390	8.23%				
Conservative	Vic Bobo	2,192	7.55%				
Liberal Democrats	Anna Marie Ellis	1,813	6.25%				
Turnout		29,028					
Rejected ballots		1,349					
Total votes		30,377					
Registered electors							
Mansfield Independent hold							
