= 2007 Mansfield District Council election =

2007 UK local government election

Elections to Mansfield District Council were held on 3 May 2007. The whole council was up for election and no boundary changes were made.

After the election, the composition of the council was:

- Labour 12
- Conservative 1
- Liberal Democrats 4
- Others 29

== Election result ==
Mansfield local election result 2007
Party	Seats	Gains	Losses	Net gain/loss	Seats %	Votes %	Votes	+/−
Labour	12		3		26			-3
Conservative	1	0	0		0.02			0
Liberal Democrats	4	0	0		0.08			0
Other parties	29	3	0		63.0			3
