= List of people from Mansfield =

This is a list of people from Mansfield, Nottinghamshire, England.

== Actors/actresses ==
- Robert Aldous (born 1934), actor, starred in Dads Army and 'Allo 'Allo!
- Dorothy Atkinson (born 1966), actress and singer, starred in Call the Midwife and Saltburn
- Cassie Bradley, actress, raised in Nottingham and Mansfield, starred in Coronation Street
- Stephen Critchlow (1966–2021), radio, TV and stage actor; starred in Doctor Who, Heartbeat and The Bill
- Wes Dolan (born 1980), actor and ainger/songwriter, based in Mansfield
- Holmes Herbert (born 1882), actor, starred in Sherlock Holmes, The Undying Monster (1942)
- Matthew James Morrison (born 1992), actor, starred in EastEnders and Boy Meets Boy

== Arts ==
- James Collinson (1825–1881), Pre-Raphaelite painter
- Charles James Martin (1886–1955), artist

== Inventors ==
- William Martin (born 1767), naturalist and palaeontologist, proposed that science should use fossils as evidence to support the study of natural history
- Major Hayman Rooke (1723–1806), lived in Mansfield Woodhouse, found the Major Oak in Sherwood Forest
- John Medley Wood (1827–1915), botanist, contributed to the knowledge of natal ferns

== Musicians/singers ==
- John Balance, formally known as Geoffrey Burton (1962–2004), singer/musician with Coil
- Cantamus Girls Choir (founded 1968), twice World Choir Olympic champions, based in Mansfield
- Mark Holmes (born 1960), lead singer of Canadian new wave rock group Platinum Blonde
- Ric Lee (born 1945), drummer with Ten Years After
- Leo Lyons (born 1943), bassist, songwriter, producer with Ten Years After
- Jay McGuiness, singer from The Wanted, educated in Mansfield
- John Ogdon (1937–1989), pianist, born in Mansfield Woodhouse
- Carly Paoli (born 1989), opera singer, was asked to perform by HRH the Prince of Wales, now King Charles III, at Windsor Castle and St James's Palace
- Alvin Stardust (1942–2014), pop singer, lived in the town as a child

== Politicians/economists ==
- Charles Brown (1884–1940), Labour Party politician elected as member of Parliament (MP) for Mansfield
- Nicholas Crafts (1949–2023), former British economist, known for his contributions to economic history, was educated in Mansfield
- Sir Ed Davey (born 1965), British politician, leader of the Liberal Democrats since 2019
- Harry Harpham (1954–2016), coal miner and MP for Sheffield Brightside and Hillsborough
- Sir John Plowright Houfton (1857–1929), colliery owner and politician from Mansfield
- Sir Richard Leese (born 1951), politician and former leader of Manchester City Council
- Alexander Malcolm (1864–1956), former member of parliament in New Zealand
- Philip Stanhope, 5th Earl of Chesterfield (born 1755), diplomat and politician, former ambassador to Spain
- (Harry) Bernard Taylor, Baron Taylor of Mansfield (1895–1991), coal miner and politician
- Dame Glenis Willmott (born 1951), medical scientist and former leader of the European Parliamentary Labour Party; aged 10 was raised in the town
- Steve Yemm, member of Parliament for Mansfield

== Religion ==
- William Chappell (1582–1649), English scholar and clergyman
- John Darrell (1562–1602), Anglican clergyman and lawyer known for his puritan views and practice as an exorcist; later imprisoned; his views were published by Samuel Harsnett and read by William Shakespeare
- George Fox, founder of the Quakers, lived in Mansfield in 1647
- Richard Sterne (1596–1683), archbishop of York in 1664; his memorial lies in York Minster

== Sports ==
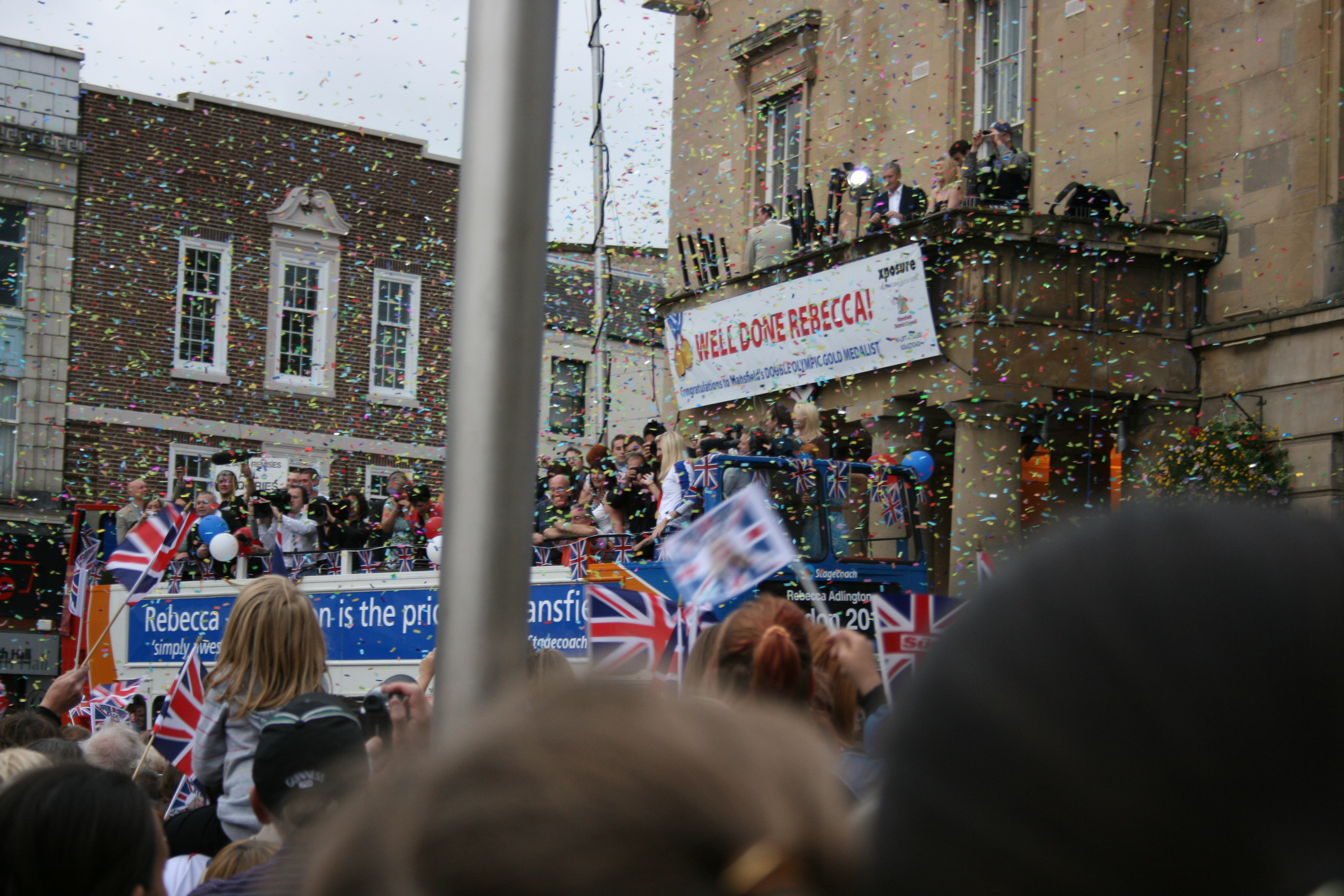
Rebecca Adlington at the Mansfield Town Hall after the 2008 Summer Olympics

- Rebecca Adlington (born 1989), Olympic bronze and gold medallist swimmer
- Jake Ball (born 1991), cricketer who played for England 2016–2018
- William Barnes (1852–1899), professional cricketer; born in Sutton-in-Ashfield, Nottinghamshire, died in Mansfield Woodhouse
- George Bean (1864–1923), cricketer; born in Sutton-in-Ashfield, Nottinghamshire, died in Mansfield
- Gordon Albert Beet (1939–1994), cricketer, died in Mansfield
- Ben and Tom Birchall, motocycle-with-sidecar road race World Championship-winning competitors in both the F1 (2009 and 2018 seasons) and F2 categories (2016); Tom is the most successful TT passenger of all time
- Peter Bircumshaw (born 1938), footballer, born in Mansfield
- Donald "Don" Bradley (1924–1997), footballer, played for Mansfield Town as a left-back
- George Butler (1810–1887), professional cricketer; born in Mansfield, died at Nottingham
- Kris Commons (born 1983), Celtic F.C. footballer
- Craig Disley (born 1981), Grimsby Town F.C. footballer
- Jason Ferguson (born 1969), former snooker player and current chairman of the World Professional Billiards and Snooker Association
- Charlotte Henshaw (born 1987), Paralympic athlete
- Brian Hill (born 1942), professional footballer, born in Mansfield
- Richard Hodgkinson (born 1983), cricketer, born in Mansfield
- Oliver Hynd (born 1994), gold medallist Paralympic swimmer
- Rob Kozluk (born 1977), footballer
- Liam Lawrence (born 1981), former Mansfield Town footballer
- Victoria Levitt (born 1996), gold medalist Paralympic athlete, lives in Mansfield
- Simon David Myles (born 1966), cricketer who played for Hong Kong, born in Mansfield
- Steven "Oggy" Ogrizovic (born 1957), football goalkeeper, born in Mansfield
- Greg Owen (born 1972), professional golfer
- James Perch (born 1985), Mansfield Town footballer
- Neil Geoffrey Pointon (born 1964), professional football (soccer) player, born in Church Warsop in Mansfield
- Cyril John Poole (1921–1996), cricketer, born in Mansfield
- Jo Potter (born 1984), football manager and former footballer and England player
- James Sadler (1830–1865), cricketer, born in Mansfield
- Henry Shaw (1854–1932), cricketer, born in Mansfield
- Lee Spick (born 1980), professional snooker player, born in Mansfield
- Kyle Ryde (born 1997), motorcycle solo road racer
- Harry Thompson (1915–2000), professional footballer, born in Mansfield
- Richard Daniel "Dan" Tremelling (1897–1978), professional footballer, played as a goalkeeper
- Steve Ward (born 1957), oldest active professional boxer, lives in Mansfield
- Joshua Ward-Hibbert (born 1994), basketball and former tennis player; plays for the London Lions and was a junior player in tennis at Wimbledon
- John Whetton (born 1941), track runner, born in Mansfield
- Oliver Wilson (born 1980), professional golfer

== Television/playwriting ==
- Andrea Adams (1946–1995), BBC broadcaster and journalist
- Richard Bacon (born 1975), broadcaster, born and grew up in Mansfield; presented Blue Peter, The Big Breakfast, Good Morning Britain, Capital FM and BBC Radio 5 Live; founded Yes Yes Media in 2023, which produces talent and game shows
- Robert Dodsley (1704–1767), playwright and poet, wrote The King and The Miller of Mansfield and Sir John Cockle; suggested and financed A Dictionary of the English Language
- James Graham (born 1982), British playwright and screenwriter; known for writing Sherwood (2022), The Way (2024), Brian and Maggie (2025) and Brexit: The Uncivil War (2019)
- Jim McGrath, educated in Mansfield
- Calvin Robinson (born 1985), writer and broadcaster
- Tom Scott (born 1984 or 1985), presenter and former web developer
- Pollyanna Woodward (born 1982), TV presenter

== Miscellaneous ==
- Sergeant Ernest Antcliffe (born 1898), World War I flying ace gunner, born in Mansfield
- Agnes Catlow (1806–1889), science writer, wrote a book on conchology
- Watson Fothergill (1841–1928), Victorian architect
- Elspeth Gibson (born 1963), Nottingham-born fashion designer, studied at Mansfield College of Art and Design
- Samuel Jebb (1694–1772), English physician, nonjuror and literary scholar
- John Ogdon (born 1937), composer and pianist from Mansfield Woodhouse
- Sir John Peace (born 1949), co-founder of Experian, former chairman of Burberry and former Lord Lieutenant of Nottinghamshire
- Henry Pierrepont, 1st Marquess of Dorchester (born 1606), former English peer
- Humphrey Ridley (born 1653), physician/writer noted for studies in neuroanatomy; wrote the first book about the brain in the English language
- Barry Snowdon, Mansfield District Council employee
- John Bainbridge Webster (1955–2016), professor of Divinity at St Mary's College, University of St Andrews and theologian; co-founded the International Journal of Systematic Theology
- Helen Wilson (1864–1951), physician and social purity campaigner; surgeon at the National Temperance Hospital in London; her attitudes towards prostitution were progressive and she campaigned against its state regulation
