= Moderate Labour Party =

Defunct minor political party in the United Kingdom

The logo of the party, a white dove holding a red rose in its beak

The Moderate Labour Party was a minor political party in the United Kingdom. It was founded in January 1987 by former members of the Labour Party who were opposed to the miners' strike and associated with the Union of Democratic Mineworkers. Its logo was a white dove holding a red rose in its beak.

Founders included Michael Gallagher, who had previously defected from Labour to the SDP while sitting as an MEP. Moderate Labour was particularly active in Nottinghamshire, especially Mansfield where they initially planned to stand 100 candidates. Mansfield's miners had opposed strikes and supported the UDM and MLP because their coalfields were comparatively efficient and productive. It fielded 26 candidates in local elections, including five sitting councillors, none of whom won their seats. They fielded two candidates in the 1987 general election against left-wing Labour candidates, with its chairman, Brian Marshall, standing in Mansfield against Alan Meale. Another candidate, Allan Harrison, stood in Batley and Spen. Benefiting from the endorsement of retiring Labour MP Don Concannon and the UDM leader David Prendergast, Marshall won 1,580 votes in Mansfield. The Conservative Party nearly took the seat, but Meale held it for the main Labour Party with a majority of only 56 votes versus Concannon's 2,216-vote majority from 1983. Moderate Labour won a seat in Bassetlaw District in May 1988 with Terry Nicholson retaining his Harworth East seat (held as a Labour councillor) by 76 votes over the Labour candidate.

The party were called "traitors" by Militant, who said that some of those joining Moderate Labour had earlier worked to expel members of Militant from Labour. A local anarchist newsletter said the Nottingham Evening Post supported the party to split the anti-Conservative vote, and called it a "blandwagon". The Evening Post used the headline "Backlash!" when reporting on the launch of Moderate Labour and printed their full manifesto. Academic Mick Wallis said Moderate Labour "spoke with the voice of the Daily Express and the new Tory right."

Gallagher rejoined Labour in the mid-1990s, regarding the whole party by then as moderate.

== See also ==
- List of Labour Party breakaway parties (UK)
