= Victor Seely =

Sir Victor Basil John Seely, 4th Baronet (18 May 1900 – 10 May 1980) was the 4th baronet of the Seely family, of Sherwood Lodge, Nottinghamshire, and son of Sir Charles Hilton Seely, 2nd Baronet.

Seely was educated at Eton College and Trinity College, Cambridge. During World War II he was a Major in the 9th Queen's Royal Lancers. He was Master of the Worshipful Company of Gunmakers in 1957 and 1964.

== Notes ==
Baronetage of the United Kingdom
Preceded by Hugh Seely	Baronet (of Sherwood Lodge and Brooke House); 1970–1980	Succeeded by Nigel Edward Seely
