= Carr Bank Park =

Park in Mansfield, Nottinghamshire, England

- Carr Bank Memorial Park
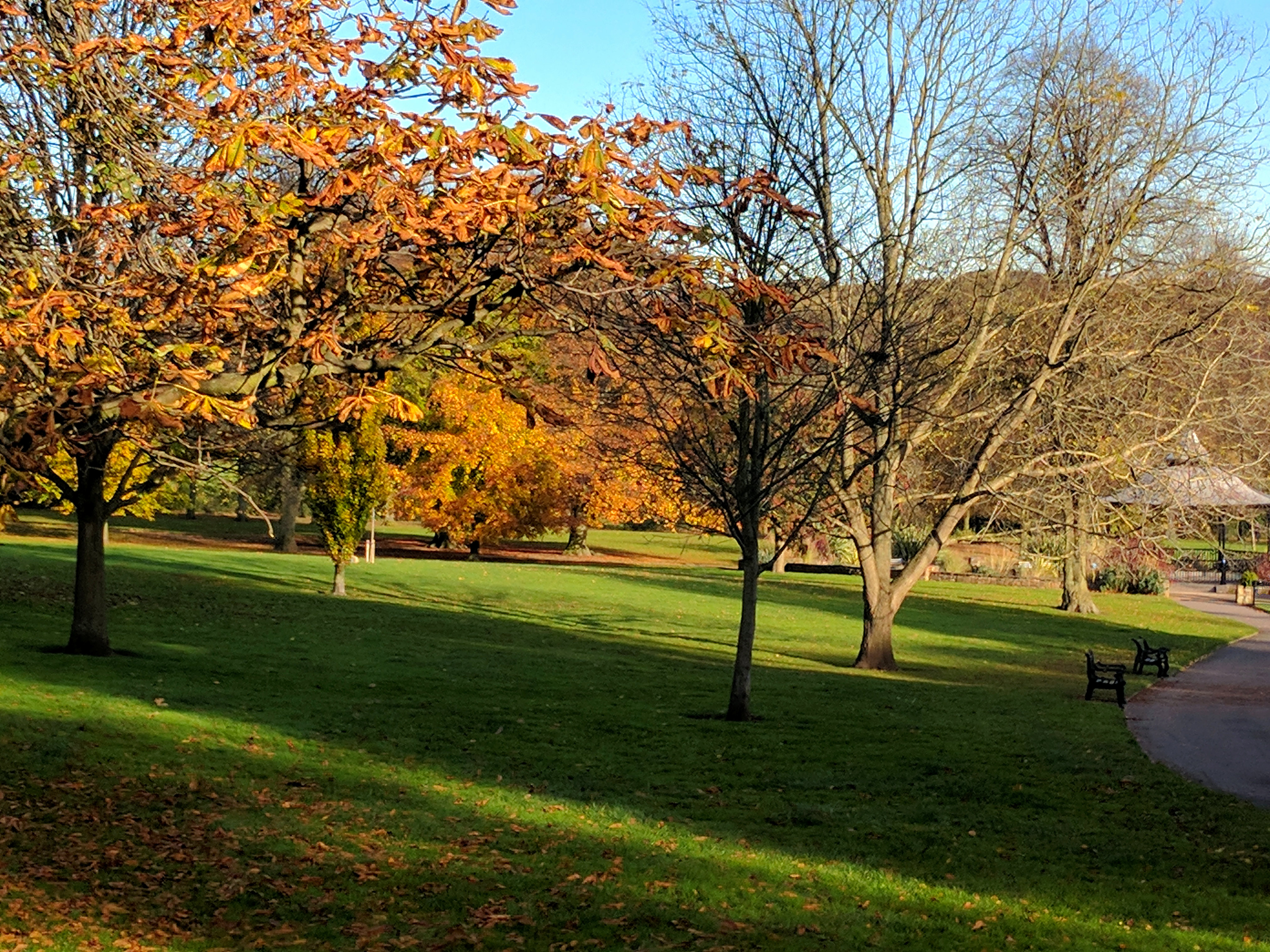
- A view of the park with the bandstand in the distance

- Location within Nottinghamshire
- Location: Windmill Lane, Mansfield Nottinghamshire NG18 2AL
- Coordinates: 53°08′56″N 1°11′24″W
- Opened: 1924
- Operator: Mansfield District Council
- Website: Carr Bank Park

Carr Bank Park is a public park situated off Windmill Lane in Mansfield, Nottinghamshire, England. It is managed and maintained by Mansfield District Council. In 2023 the park was granted the Green Flag Award.

== Etymology ==
In AD 868 the Danes came into Nottinghamshire and by AD 877 they had complete control over the county. The names of some parts of the town, including Carr Bank, are evidence of this occupation.

== History ==
Carr Bank mansion was built by the architect William Wilkinson of Mansfield Woodhouse in 1805 as a residence for the local cotton spinner and owner of nearby Stanton Mill, Charles Stanton. The estate then became the property of the Greenhalgh family. Wilkinson also built the Midland Hotel in the town.

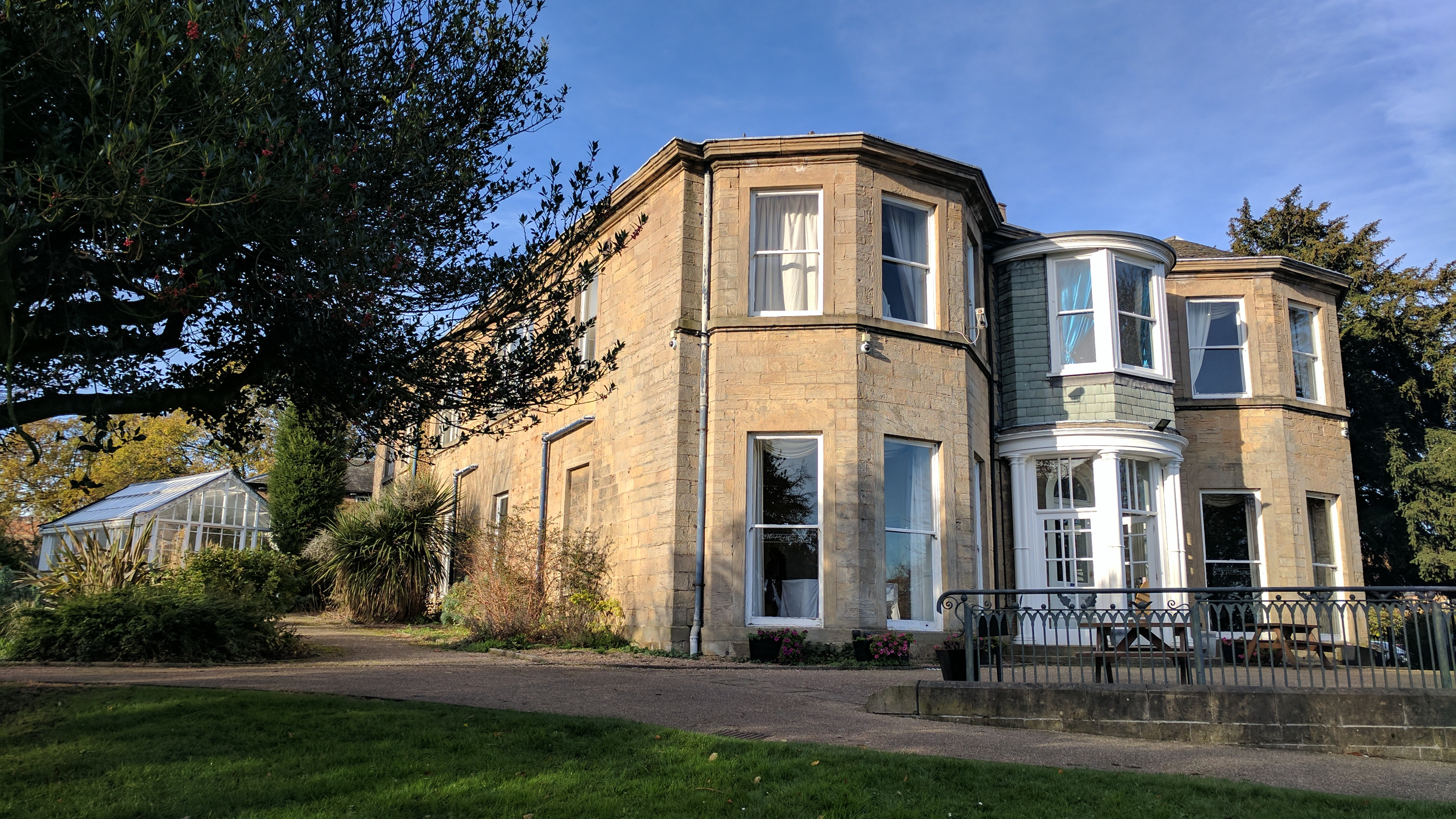
Carr Bank mansion

Later the estate became the property of William Cavendish-Bentinck, 6th Duke of Portland, who then sold the house and grounds to the borough council.

The Duke advised that he wanted the grounds to be used as a public park (which it was in 1924) and the house to be used as a museum.

== Memorials ==
A memorial was built to remember the men who died in World War I. The memorial was unveiled in 1926 and is now grade II listed. In April 2011, the central bronze plaque was stolen. It was replaced by black granite, inscribed with gold lettering.

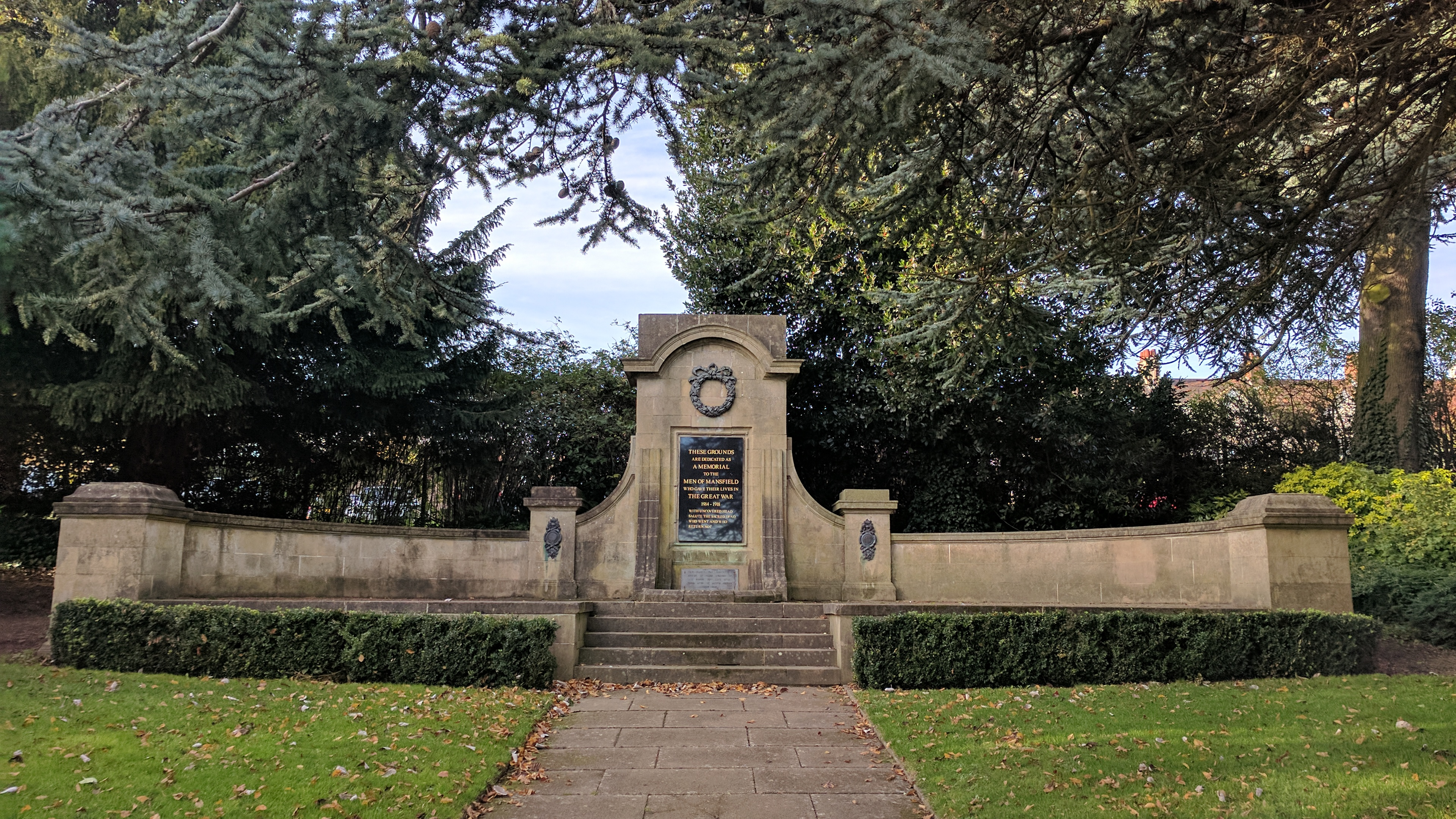
The 1914–1918 War Memorial

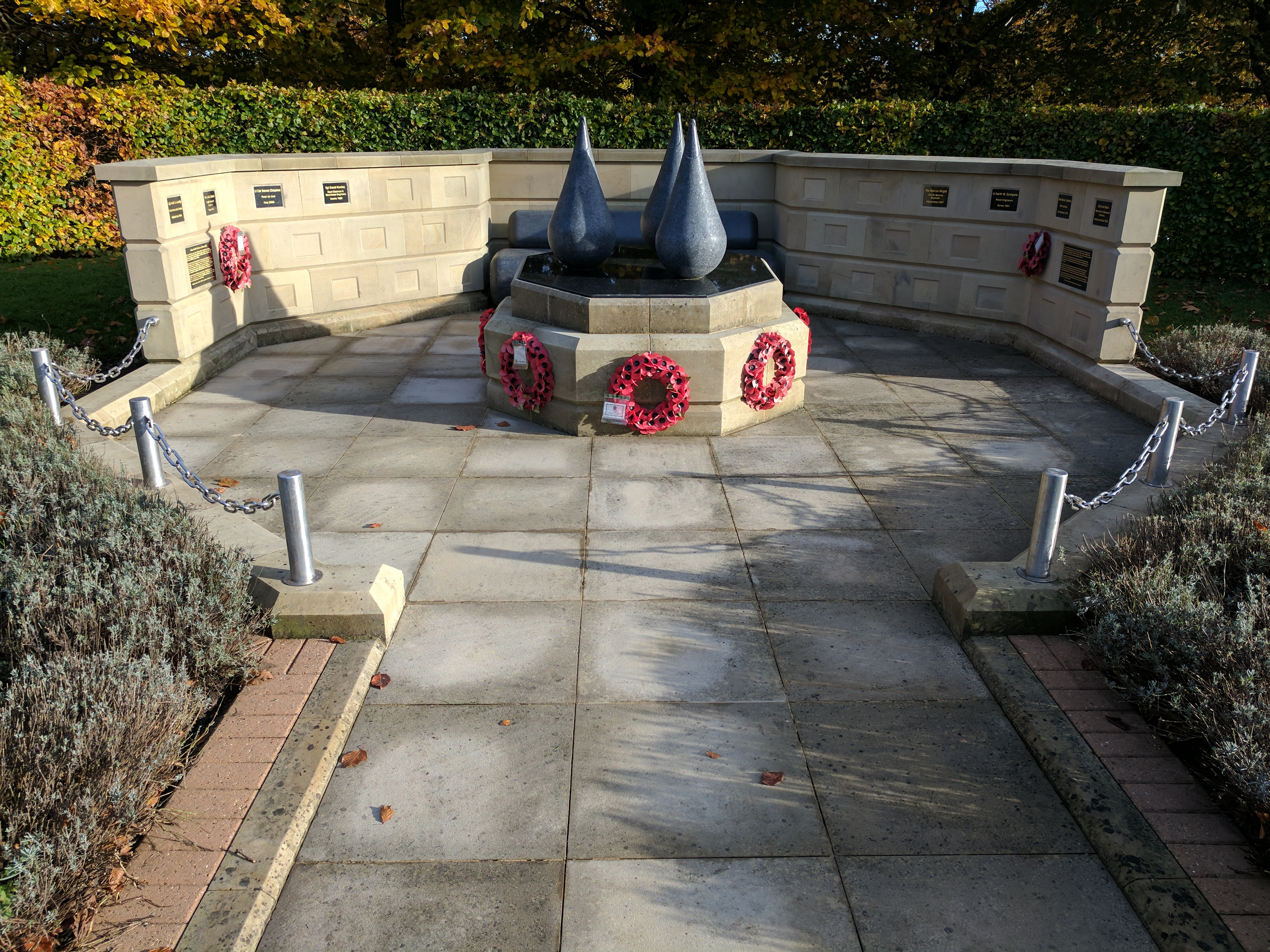
Memorial to armed forces personnel fallen after WWII

A newer memorial dedicated to post-WW2 losses was mooted in 2009 and, following fundraising, was completed by June 2011, called Mansfield's Heroes Memorial, before official unveiling on Armed Forces Day, 25 June 2011.

== Amenities ==
Carr Bank Park has a playground for children, tennis courts, bowling green and tea house. The mansion, a Grade II listed building, is now used as a wedding venue.

An Edwardian-style bandstand, commissioned by MDC, was completed by March 2012. It was formally opened on 13 May by then-mayor, Tony Egginton, along with a then-ward councillor who was also a member of Friends of Carr Bank Park.

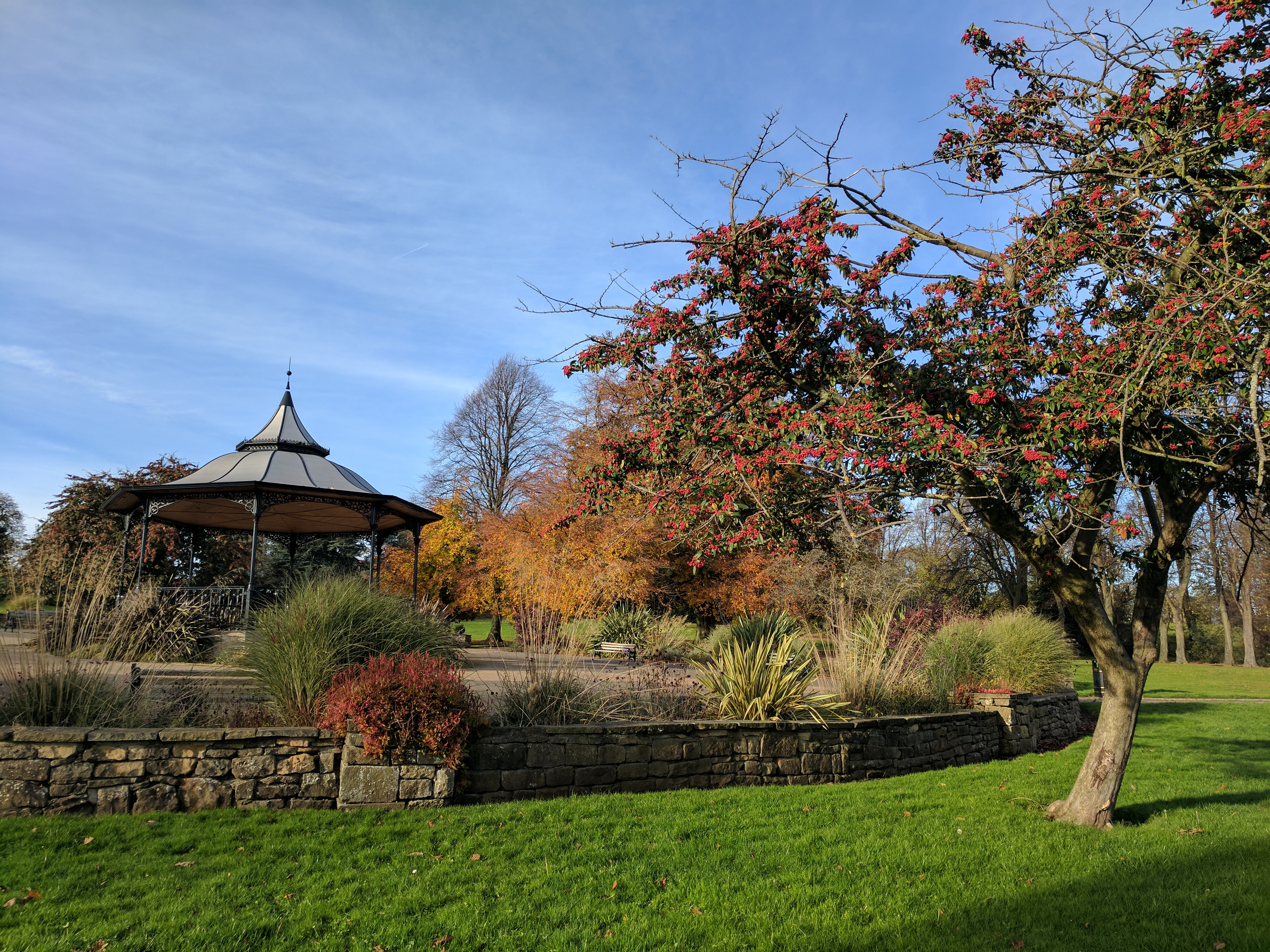
Carr Bank Park bandstand
