= Kate Allsop =

British local politician (1954–2025)

Mayor of Mansfield
- In office 11 May 2015 – 5 May 2019
- Preceded by: Tony Egginton
- Succeeded by: Andy Abrahams

Personal details
- Born: Kathryn Rita Allsop; 12 November 1954
- Died: 6 December 2025 (aged 71)
- Party: Conservative (before 2011); Mansfield Independent Forum (2011–2019); Reform UK (2019–2025)

Kathryn Rita Allsop (12 November 1954 – 6 December 2025) was a British local politician who was the directly elected Mayor of Mansfield from 2015 until the 2019 election when she was beaten by Labour candidate Andy Abrahams by two votes.

== Career ==
Allsop first stood for the post in 2002 as a member of the Conservative Party. Allsop left the Conservative party in 2003 to become an "Independent Conservative", describing herself in the local newspaper as "true blue", remaining as president of Mansfield's Conservative Association.

She later joined the Mansfield Independent Forum and was elected as a councillor in 2011.

=== Mayor of Mansfield ===
Allsop succeeded Tony Egginton as mayor after beating the Labour party candidate in the 2015 Mayoral election. Her campaign was afterwards subject to a Police investigation after allegations were made regarding potential breaches of electoral law, involving spending more on campaigning than the permitted maximum of £6,969.72. The Crown Prosecution Service's lawyer subsequently confirmed the probe had been dropped due to "...insufficient evidence to provide a realistic prospect of conviction.". As Mayor of Mansfield, she was in control of the Mansfield District.

=== Involvement in Brexit Party ===
Following her tenure as mayor, Allsop briefly served as an advisor to Merthyr Tydfil council before the agreement of £300 per day plus expenses was terminated when, abruptly, she publicly announced her intention to be the Brexit Party's parliamentary candidate in Mansfield.

Allsop had been recruited as an experienced Independent former local bureaucrat "...to develop and strengthen working relationships across all political groups and between members and officers." Following Allsop's announcement to stand as an MP without notifying her employer (the devolved Welsh Government), her 'independent' status was fundamentally changed and compromised the basis on which she had been selected, by becoming prominently engaged in national political activity.

Welsh Government minister Julie James stated it would be "inappropriate" for Allsop to continue in the role as an independent advisor.

Allsop learned on 11 November of Brexit Party supremo Nigel Farage's decision to withdraw their parliamentary candidates in the 2019 general election from 317 areas having a sitting conservative MP – including Mansfield, where Allsop had planned to stand since before losing her job as an adviser to Merthyr council in August.

== Death ==
On 8 December 2025, it was announced that Allsop had died at the age of 71.
