= Mayor of Mansfield =

Political office in England

- Incumbent; Andy Abrahams since 6 May 2019
- Style: Executive Mayor
- Member of: Mansfield Labour Group
- Appointer: Electorate of Mansfield
- Term length: Four years
- Salary: £49,377.04 (Special responsibility allowance) + £7935.96 (associated expenses) 2022/23
- Website: Meet the Mayor

The Mayor of Mansfield is the directly elected local authority executive mayor of the district of Mansfield in Nottinghamshire, England. A new appointment was created from 2002 following moves made by a Mansfield-based businessman to change the governance of Mansfield after a public referendum.

Andy Abrahams was elected on 3 May 2019 by two votes from sitting incumbent Kate Allsop after two recounts of the second-preference votes.

The incumbent from 2002 to May 2015 was Tony Egginton, succeeded by his fellow Mansfield Independent Forum party member Kate Allsop, who stood against Egginton in 2002 as a Conservative.

From the 2015 booklet issued to all households having registered voters:

An elected Mayor is different to a ceremonial Mayor or Leader of the council as they are elected by the people of Mansfield district.

It is the job of the Mayor to represent the council and its residents, make key decisions on policies, services and how the council spends its money.

The Mayor is supported by a Cabinet of councillors who help him or her develop and implement these policies.

In July 2026, Andy Abrahams, incumbent Mayor from 2019, confirmed that the position would be abolished as part of the local government reorganisation scheduled for 2028.

== History ==
=== Establishment ===
The role of elected mayor was created following a public referendum on 2 May 2002. The referendum was the culmination of a campaign led by local businessman Stewart Rickersey to have a directly elected mayor for the district. The inaugural election was scheduled for 17 October 2002. Prior to the referendum Mansfield District Council was governed by a leader and cabinet system, in which a leader of the council was elected indirectly from the largest group elected to the council. Labour councillor Jim Hawkins had been leader of the council from its creation in 1974; he did not stand for election as mayor, with Labour's candidate being the deputy leader of the council, Lorna Carter.

Mayor of Mansfield Referendum 2 May 2002
Choice	Votes	%
Elected Mayor	8,972	54.97
Cabinet System	7,350	45.03
Total	16,322	100.00
Registered voters/turnout		21

=== 2002-2015: Tony Egginton ===
Tony Egginton was Mayor of Mansfield from October 2002 until retirement in May 2015, being replaced at scheduled elections by a fellow candidate for the Mansfield Independent Forum political party, Kate Allsop. Much was said of the first Executive Mayor, but during his time in office, Mansfield struggled with local land development and many projects across the region faltered.

Egginton (in office 2002–2015) was criticised by some councillors and residents for placing too much focus on self-publicity, as opposed to publicity for the town. The issue was raised again after his prominent role in the homecoming ceremony for swimmer Rebecca Adlington after her Gold Medal successes at the 2008 Beijing Olympic Games.

== Election results ==
=== 2002 ===
Mansfield Mayoral Election 17 October 2002
Party	Candidate	1st round		2nd round			1st round votesTransfer votes, 2nd round
Party	Candidate	Total	Of round	Transfers	Total	Of round	1st round votesTransfer votes, 2nd round
Independent	Tony Egginton	4,150	29.6%	1,801	5,951	52.6%	
Labour	Lorna Carter	4,773	34.0%	590	5,363	47.4%	
Conservative	Kate Allsop	3,351	23.9%				
Liberal Democrats	Phil Smith	958	6.8%				
Green	Mike Comerford	811	5.8%				
Turnout		14,043					
Independent win							

=== 2007 ===
Mansfield Mayoral Election 3 May 2007
Party	Candidate	1st round		2nd round			1st round votesTransfer votes, 2nd round
Party	Candidate	Total	Of round	Transfers	Total	Of round	1st round votesTransfer votes, 2nd round
Mansfield Independent	Tony Egginton	12,015	36.7%	1,705	13,720	61.0%	
Labour	Alan Meale	8,129	30.8%	655	8,784	39.0%	
Conservative	Aaron Beattie	2,770	10.5%				
Liberal Democrats	Philip Burman	1,944	7.4%				
Green	Mary Button	1,489	5.6%				
Turnout		26,383	34.2				
Mansfield Independent hold							

=== 2011 ===
The 2011 election was third direct election for the mayoralty of Mansfield. The sitting mayor, Tony Egginton, successfully defended his position, which he first won in 2002. On 5 May 2011 he was elected for the third time, winning in the second round of voting with the narrow majority of 67 over the Labour candidate Stephen Yemm.

Mansfield Mayoral Election 5 May 2011
Party	Candidate	1st round		2nd round			1st round votesTransfer votes, 2nd round
Party	Candidate	Total	Of round	Transfers	Total	Of round	1st round votesTransfer votes, 2nd round
Mansfield Independent	Tony Egginton	10,901	37.6%	1,779	12,680	50.1%	
Labour	Stephen Yemm	11,732	40.4%	881	12,613	49.9%	
UKIP	David Hamilton	2,390	8.2%				
Conservative	Vic Bobo	2,192	7.6%				
Liberal Democrats	Anna Marie Ellis	1,813	6.3%				
Turnout		29,028					
Mansfield Independent hold							

=== 2015 ===
The 2015 election was fourth direct election for the mayoralty of Mansfield. The sitting mayor, Tony Egginton, had previously announced his intention to retire. On 7 May 2015 the candidates were former Labour-member turned Independent Phil Shields, Labour's Martin Lee and Mansfield Independent Forum's Kate Allsop, who after the second round of voting won from Martin Lee with a considerable majority.

Mansfield Mayoral Election 7 May 2015
Party	Candidate	1st round		2nd round			1st round votesTransfer votes, 2nd round
Party	Candidate	Total	Of round	Transfers	Total	Of round	1st round votesTransfer votes, 2nd round
Mansfield Independent	Kate Allsop	17,604	37.94%	4,996	22,600	53.4%	
Labour	Martin Lee	17,562	37.85%	2,158	19,720	46.6%	
Independent	Philip Shields	9,672	20.84%				
Turnout		46,402					
Mansfield Independent hold							

=== 2019 ===
The 2019 election took place on 2 May 2019. The candidates were Incumbent Mayor Kate Allsop from the Mansfield Independent Forum (MIF), Conservative perennial candidate George Jabbour, and District and County Councillor Steve Garner, formerly with MIF, standing as an independent. In late March Mansfield Labour group selected a third candidate in former teacher and civil engineer Andy Abrahams, following the suspension of Cllr Sean McCallum and resignation of Paul Bradshaw. In March 2019, 2015 Mayoral Candidate and former District Councillor Philip Shields announced his intention to run in 2019.

Mansfield Mayoral Election 2 May 2019
Party	Candidate	1st round		2nd round			1st round votesTransfer votes, 2nd round
Party	Candidate	Total	Of round	Transfers	Total	Of round	1st round votesTransfer votes, 2nd round
Labour	Andy Abrahams	6,681	29.18%	1,249	7,930	50.01%	
Mansfield Independent	Kate Allsop	5,860	24.84%	2,068	7,928	49.99%	
Independent	Steve Garner	4,827	20.47%				
Conservative	George Jabbour	3,592	15.23%				
Independent	Philip Shields	2,422	10.27%				
Turnout		23,582	29.8%				
Labour gain from Mansfield Independent							

=== 2023 ===
The 2023 mayoral election took place on 4 May 2023. Final candidates declared in early April were Andy Abrahams (Labour), Mick Barton (Mansfield Independents), Andre Camilleri (Conservative), Karen Seymour (Trade Unionist and Socialist Coalition) and Julie Margaret Tasker-Love-Birks (Independent). Both the Conservative and Trade Unionist and Socialist Coalition candidates' campaigns included potentially seeking to abolish the position of executive mayor, subject to a successful public referendum.

Labour's Andy Abrahams was re-elected with a significant margin of over 4,000 votes, in contrast with his previous win by two votes.

The voting system was first past the post – changing from the supplementary vote system used previously.

Mansfield Mayoral Election 2023
Party	Candidate	Votes	%	±%
Labour	Andy Abrahams	9,987	45.1%	▲15.9
Conservative	Andre Camilleri	5,832	26.3%	▲11.1
Mansfield Independent	Mick Barton	4,992	22.5%	▼2.3
Independent	Julie Tasker-Love-Birks	936	4.2%	New
TUSC	Karen Seymour	420	1.9%	New
Turnout		22,167	27.7%	▼2.1
Labour hold		Swing		

== See also ==
- Mansfield District Council area
- Mansfield (UK Parliament constituency)
