= Hugh Seely, 1st Baron Sherwood =

British Liberal politician

The Right Honourable The Lord Sherwood
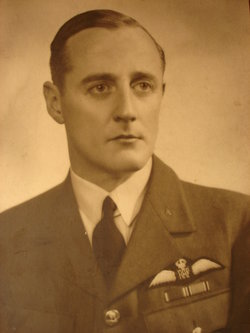

Under-Secretary of State for Air
- In office 1941–1944 Serving with The Lord Balfour of Inchrye (1941–44)
- Prime Minister: Winston Churchill
- Preceded by: Anthony Muirhead
- Succeeded by: Rupert Brabner

Member of Parliament for Berwick-upon-Tweed
- In office 14 November 1935 – 14 August 1941
- Preceded by: Alfred Todd
- Succeeded by: George Grey

Member of Parliament for East Norfolk
- In office 6 December 1923 – 29 October 1924
- Preceded by: Michael Falcon
- Succeeded by: Reginald Neville

Personal details
- Born: 2 October 1898
- Died: 1 April 1970 (aged 71)
- Party: Liberal
- Spouses: Hon. Molly Chetwode (m. 1942; div. 1948) Catherine Thornton Ranger (m. 1970)

Military service
- Allegiance: United Kingdom
- Branch/service: British Army, Auxiliary Air Force
- Years of service: 1914–1918, 1936–1938
- Rank: Lieutenant, Squadron Leader
- Unit: Grenadier Guards, No. 504 Squadron RAF
- Commands: No. 504 Squadron RAF
- Battles/wars: First World War: Western Front

Hugh Michael Seely, 1st Baron Sherwood (2 October 1898 – 1 April 1970), known as Sir Hugh Seely, 3rd Baronet, of Sherwood Lodge, Nottinghamshire, from 1926 to 1941, was a British Liberal politician.

== Early life ==
Seely was born on 2 October 1898 into a family of politicians, industrialists and significant landowners. His great-grandfather Charles Seely, grandfather Sir Charles Seely, 1st Baronet, father Sir Charles Seely, 2nd Baronet, and uncle J. E. B. Seely, 1st Baron Mottistone, were all members of Parliament. His mother, Hilda Lucy Grant, was the daughter of Richard Tassell Anthony Grant and the granddaughter of inventor Sir Thomas Tassell Grant. His brother Victor's son was Sir Nigel Seely.

Seely was educated at Eton College and became a lieutenant in the Grenadier Guards.

== Career ==
Seely served with the Auxiliary Air Force and was the Commanding Officer for No. 504 Squadron RAF from 1936 to 1938. He was a Member of Parliament (MP) for East Norfolk from 1923 to 1924, High Sheriff of Nottinghamshire for 1925 and MP for Berwick-upon-Tweed from 1935 to 1941. He was the Joint Under-Secretary of State for Air during a large part of the Second World War (1941–45). In 1946 he acquired and was Chairman of the famous gunmaker James Purdey and Sons.

He was created Baron Sherwood, of Calverton in the County of Nottingham on 14 August 1941.

== Personal life ==
On 23 March 1942, Seely married the Hon. Molly Patricia (née Berry) Chetwode, daughter of William Berry, 1st Viscount Camrose, who owned The Daily Telegraph newspaper. She was the widow of Roger Charles George Chetwode (a son of Philip Chetwode, 1st Baron Chetwode), with whom she had two sons. The marriage was short-lived, however, as the couple divorced in 1948. She later married Sir Richard Cotterell, 5th Baronet, in 1958.

Lord Sherwood remarried to Catherine (née Thornton) Ranger (widow of John Osborne Ranger) on 16 March 1970, shortly before his death on 1 April 1970. As he had no children, the barony became extinct upon his death. His brother Victor inherited the baronetcy.

== See also ==
- Seely baronets

Parliament of the United Kingdom
Preceded by Michael Falcon	Member of Parliament for East Norfolk; 1923–1924	Succeeded by Reginald Neville
Preceded by Alfred Todd	Member of Parliament for Berwick-upon-Tweed; 1935–1941	Succeeded by George Charles Grey
Baronetage of the United Kingdom
Preceded by Charles Seely	Baronet; 1926–1970	Succeeded by Victor Seely
Peerage of the United Kingdom
New creation	Baron Sherwood; 1941–1970	Extinct
