= Violet Markham =

British politician (1872–1959)

Violet Rosa Markham
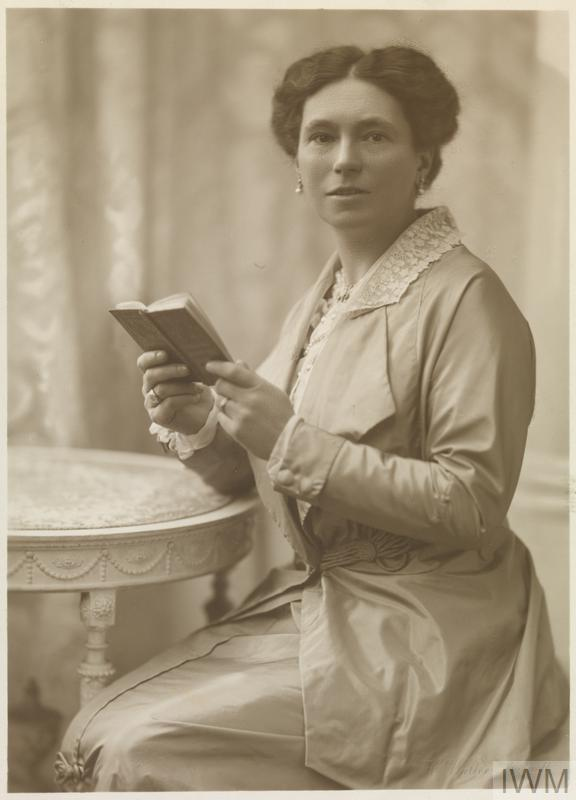
- Violet Markham, of the National Service League, WW I
- Born: 1872
- Died: 1959 (aged 86–87)
- Spouse: Lieutenant-Colonel James Carruthers
- Relatives: Sir Arthur Markham, 1st Baronet (brother), Charles Paxton Markham (brother)

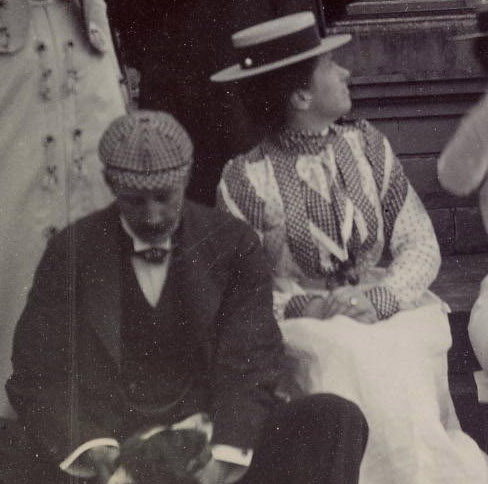
Violet Markham and her brother Charles Paxton Markham (1903)

Violet Rosa Markham CH (October 1872 – 2 February 1959) was a writer, social reformer, campaigner against women's suffrage and administrator. She grew up near Chesterfield, Derbyshire. Actively involved in community and welfare work, she held a number of public positions, including in educational administration, and social assistance and poverty relief bodies. Despite her opposition to women's suffrage, she stood for election as a Liberal Party candidate in the 1918 General Election, without success, and later served as a town councillor and the first female mayor of Chesterfield. Her writings on her travels and an autobiographical work, among others, were published during her lifetime. Markham married James Carruthers in 1915; he died in 1936.

== Background and early life ==
Violet Markham was the daughter of Charles Markham, part owner of the profitable Markham Collieries and Markham & Co. Engineering of Chesterfield. Her mother was a daughter of Sir Joseph Paxton, designer of the Crystal Palace, the centrepiece of the Great Exhibition of 1851. When a friend of her late father died in 1901, Violet inherited enough money to live an independent life and devote her wealth to causes she supported, as well as to buy her own house in London.

== Politics and activism ==
=== Community work ===
Her first interest was education. Markham was a member of the Chesterfield Education Authority from 1899 to 1934, and in 1902 she was the founding President of the Chesterfield Settlement, an educational foundation for the local community which existed until 1958. While travelling to South Africa in the summer of 1899, Markham met Lady Edward Cecil. The two became good friends, and together created the Victoria League in 1901.

Later she became involved in public service in different sectors. At the outbreak of the First World War, she became a member of the Executive Committee of the National Relief Fund, established to alleviate distress caused by the war. The fund dispensed aid to service families and dependents, as well as civilians. The experience of this organisation left her with a lifelong interest in reducing the effects of poverty and unemployment, especially with regard to women. In 1914 she became a member and later chairman of the Central Committee of Women's Training and Employment, which in 25 years trained nearly 100,000 women, mainly for domestic service. In 1917 she was made deputy director of the women's section of the National Service League, and was one of the first recipients of the Order of the Companions of Honour. In 1920 she began a long period as a member of the Industrial Court, and became a member of the Lord Chancellor's Advisory Committee for Women Justices.

In 1934, she became a member of the Unemployment Assistance Board, becoming deputy chairperson in 1937 – "probably the most important administrative post up to that time that had been held by a woman", according to her obituary in The Times. When the Second World War began, it was inevitable that her talents would be called on. She organised an all-night canteen for the poor of South London. She was on the appeal tribunal of the Defence of the Realm Regulations, and in 1942, she was asked to produce a report on allegations of immorality in the women's services. In 1945 she produced a report with Florence Hancock on the postwar organisation of domestic service.

=== Electoral politics ===
Markham was also active politically. In the 1918 General Election, she stood as the official Liberal candidate for the Mansfield Division of Nottinghamshire. (The Coalition Coupon went to Jarrett);

General Election 1918: Mansfield Electorate 39,041
Party	Candidate	Votes	%	±%
Labour	William Carter	8,957	43.6	
National Democratic	George William Symonds Jarrett	6,678	32.6	
Liberal	Mrs Violet Rosa Carruthers	4,000	19.5	
Independent	Dr Nowroji M Tarachand	878	4.3	
Majority		2,279	11.0	
Turnout			52.5	
Labour gain from Liberal		Swing		

She was elected as a town councillor for Chesterfield in 1924, and served as the first female Mayor of Chesterfield in 1927. It would be 39 years before Chesterfield had another female Mayor.

=== Views ===
Despite being a social reformer, Violet Markham was strongly opposed to women being given the vote. She addressed an anti-suffrage meeting at the Royal Albert Hall on 28 February 1912 (publicised in a letter to The Spectator published on 10 February 1912) which had been organised by the National League for Opposing Woman Suffrage. Markham told the audience that the views of the women's suffrage movement "fly in the face of hard facts and natural law." She went on to say that, "We believe that men and women are different – not similar – beings, with talents that are complementary, not identical, and that they therefore ought to have different shares in the management of the State, that they severally compose. We do not depreciate by one jot or tittle women’s work and mission. We are concerned to find proper channels of expression for that work. We seek a fruitful diversity of political function, not a stultifying uniformity."

Although Markham opposed women's suffrage, Mary Stocks, herself a women's suffrage supporter, considered her to be "the best feminist I've ever known, a real feminist".

The idea that there should also be Girl Scouts, as counterpart to the new Boy Scout Movement, following their appearance at the 1909 Crystal Palace Rally, met with Markham's strong disapproval, as expressed in The Spectator.

May I draw your attention to an offshoot of this [Boy Scouts] movement which seems to me thoroughly mischievous,—namely, Girl Scouts ?...the mixed scouting described...not one word of defence is possible; but... I still urge the undesirability of any general development of this Girl Scouts scheme even on reorganised lines... Girls are not boys, and the training which develops manly qualities in the one may lead to the negation of womanliness in the other.

— Violet Markham, The Spectator (1909)

== Personal life ==
Markham travelled extensively abroad. Among her friends was the Canadian politician Mackenzie King, whom she met in 1905 and with whom she kept up an active correspondence for 45 years. King visited her when he was in England and she visited him on her occasional trips to Canada. She sent him money on a number of occasions, notably after his electoral defeat in 1911, and again to provide medical treatment for his brother who was suffering from tuberculosis. In 1923, the Canadian government appointed her to represent them on the governing body of the International Labour Organization in Geneva.

In 1915, Markham married Lieutenant-Colonel James Carruthers, but she continued to be known by her maiden name. She accompanied her husband to Cologne, when he was stationed there as chief demobilisation officer for the British Army of the Rhine, following the First World War. Her husband was subsequently a racehorse owner, who died suddenly at Ayr Racecourse in 1936. She wrote several books, including Paxton and the Bachelor Duke, a biography of her grandfather (1935), her autobiography, Return Passage (1953), and Friendship's Harvest (1956).

== Sources ==
- Archive.org (sign in to view links and sources)
- Helen Jones (Editor): Duty and Citizenship: The Correspondence and Papers of Violet Markham, 1896–1953 ISBN 1-872273-03-3
- The Times (of London), Digital Archive

== Primary Sources ==
- Markham, Violet, South Africa, Past and Present (1900)
- Markham, Violet, The New Era in South Africa (1904)
- Markham, Violet (11 September 1909). "The Boy Scouts". The Spectator. pp. 9–10. Column on Scouting movement – via The Spectator Archive.
- Markham, Violet, The South Africa Scene (1913)
- Markham, Violet, Watching on the Rhine (1921)
- Markham, Violet, The Factory and shop acts of the British Dominions: A Handbook (1922)
- Markham, Violet, Romanesque France (1929)
- Markham, Violet, Paxton and the Bachelor Duke (1935)
- Carruthers (formerly Markham), Violet, May Tennant: A Portrait (1949)
- Markham, Violet, Return Passage (1953) an autobiography
- Markham, Violet, Friendship's Harvest (1956)
- Markham, Violet, & Jones, Helen, Duty and Citizenship: The Correspondence and Political Papers of Violet Markham, 1896-1953 (1994)
