= Sir Arthur Markham, 1st Baronet =

British politician

Sir Arthur Markham Bt MP

Member of Parliament for Mansfield
- In office 25 October 1900 – 5 August 1916
- Preceded by: John Williams
- Succeeded by: Sir Charles Seely

Personal details
- Born: 25 August 1866 Brimington, Derbyshire, England
- Died: 5 August 1916 (aged 49) Newstead Abbey, England
- Spouse: Lucy Bertram Cunningham (m. 1898)
- Children: Mansfield Markham (second son)
- Relatives: Violet Markham (sister) Charles Paxton Markham (brother)

Sir Arthur Basil Markham, 1st Baronet (25 August 1866 – 5 August 1916) was a British industrialist and politician.

== Life ==
Markham was born on 25 August 1866 at Brimington Hall in Brimington, near Chesterfield. He was the son of Charles Markham who was part owner of the family coal mine, Markham Colliery, in Chesterfield. On his mother's side he was the grandson of Sir Joseph Paxton, designer of The Great Exhibition's Crystal Palace. He was educated at Rugby School. In 1898 he married Lucy Bertram Cunningham (c.1873–4 February 1960).

Markham served from 1900 to 1916 as Liberal M.P. for the Mansfield Division of Nottinghamshire. He was created a baronet, Markham of Beachborough Park, Newington, Kent, on 10 July 1911. The districts of Beachborough and Newington are now eclipsed by the Eurotunnel terminus on the outskirts of Folkestone. Arthur Markham's technical skill, commercial insight and courage helped the development of considerable parts of the English and Welsh coalfields. He managed and owned a number of other coalmines, and there are many villages, businesses, streets and areas in Wales, Derbyshire and South Yorkshire bearing the name Markham. His brother was Charles Paxton Markham owner of Markham & Co. Engineering of Chesterfield. The firm was one of largest suppliers of coal mine winders. His brother was also director of Staveley Coal and Iron Company.

During the First World War, Markham and his wife Lady Lucy Markham née Cunningham made their house near Folkestone available to the government for the accommodation of overseas officers and also purchased and sent aid packages to British prisoners of war in German hands. Lady Markham also nursed. Markham fought tirelessly against the recruitment of under age soldiers into the British Army during the war, and ultimately, these efforts contributed to his untimely death at the age of 49.

Markham died of a heart attack on 5 August 1916 at Newstead Abbey near Mansfield.

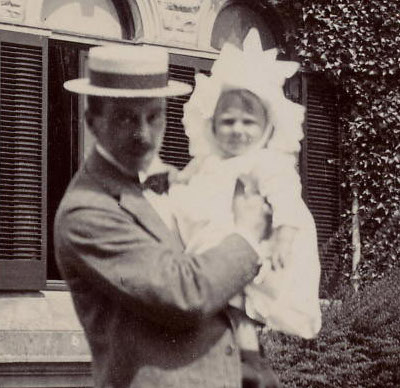
Markham holding his daughter, Joyous, in 1903

== Family ==
His sister Violet Markham also stood as an Independent Liberal for Mansfield at the 1918 general election. For her wartime services, Lady Markham was appointed Commander of the Order of the British Empire (CBE) in the 1920 New Year Honours.

== Legacy ==
On his death, his eldest son, Charles, became the 2nd Baronet Markham of Arusha, East Africa.

After his death, his sister Violet arranged for an annual competition to be held in memory of her brother. The Arthur Markham Memorial Fund was used to give a prize for the best essay written by a manual worker on a subject chosen for that year. The competition had been chosen as both Markhams (Violet and Arthur) believed that there was untapped intelligence that needed to be rewarded.

Coat of arms of Sir Arthur Markham, 1st Baronet
Crest The winged lion of Saint Mark passant guardant Or resting its dexter fore-paw on a lozenge as in the arms the halo Gules. Escutcheon Azure on a pale Argent three lozenges Sable issuant from a chief engrailed Or a demi-lion rampant Gules. Motto Tenax Propositi

Parliament of the United Kingdom
Preceded by John Williams	Member of Parliament for Mansfield; 1900 – 1916	Succeeded by Sir Charles Seely
Baronetage of the United Kingdom
New creation	Baronet (of Beachborough Park); 1911–1916	Succeeded by Charles Markham
