= 1941 Mansfield by-election =

1941 UK by-election

The 1941 Mansfield by-election was a parliamentary by-election held for the British House of Commons constituency of Mansfield on 9 April 1941. The seat had become vacant when the Labour Member of Parliament Charles Brown had died on 22 December 1940. Brown had held the seat since the 1929 general election.

The Labour party selected as its candidate Bernard Taylor, who had been Brown's election agent since 1929. The parties in the war-time Coalition Government had agreed not to contest vacancies in seats held by other coalition parties, so Taylor was returned unopposed.

Taylor represented the constituency until he retired from the House of Commons at the 1966 general election. He was then made a life peer in the dissolution honours list.

== See also ==
- Mansfield (UK Parliament constituency)
- 1916 Mansfield by-election
- Mansfield
- Lists of United Kingdom by-elections
