= Barry Snowdon =

Barry Snowdon (born 10 February 1968) is a British street sweeper employed by Mansfield District Council working in Market Warsop, Nottinghamshire, England. In 2007 and 2008, he performed two acts of heroism that resulted in national recognition, culminating in a Local Government Council Worker of the Year Award in 2008 and a Reach Out Award for Bravery in 2009.

== Heroism ==
Barry Snowdon was shortlisted in the Bravery category of the Local Government Council Worker of the Year Awards after carrying out two acts of outstanding bravery while out on his rounds.

=== 2007 ===
In March 2007, Snowdon chased and caught a thief in Warsop (Notts), after local chiropodist Maxine Kimberley had her handbag stolen. He chased after the thief, holding him down until the police arrived and returning the handbag to its grateful owner in the process.

=== 2008 ===
In summer 2008, when carrying out his normal rounds, Barry saw a private highways truck containing high-pressure gas bottles and other highly flammable items on fire only yards away from the BP petrol station on Sherwood Street in Warsop. Snowdon ran to the rescue, grabbing a fire extinguisher from the garage forecourt, and successfully fought the flames single-handedly, sustaining burns to his arms in the process.

At the time he said "I could see the lorry was in danger of exploding and just did what anyone would have done – my instincts were to get the fire out as quickly as possible."

== Recognition ==
- 2007, commended for service beyond the call of duty.
- 2008, awarded a commendation by Mansfield mayor Tony Egginton.
- 2008, received Warsop Parish Council award in recognition of hard work and dedication.
- 2008, nominated for a BBC Radio Reach Out Award.
  Snowdon was supported in his campaign, by among others, television star Noel Edmonds, who stated "Barry is a fantastic inspiration for everyone who believes that if we are to improve British society we must all take unselfish action and display a greater respect and responsibility for each other". Bassetlaw Member of Parliament John Mann also supported Snowdon's nomination, and has stated "Every city, town and village needs a super hero and Warsop are lucky to have Barry Snowdon. On two occasions he has put himself at huge risk to help other people".
- 2009, given a surprise award live on national television, with recognition by Noel Edmonds and Sky One. When invited to be in the audience, Snowdon and his wife were surprised on the national television show Noel's HQ when he was awarded with an all expenses paid holiday to Orlando, Florida and free passes to the Disney World theme park.
- 2009, won the national Local Government Council Worker of the Year award as the bravest council worker in the country, as announced at the end of the LGA's annual conference, beating out three other finalists in category of bravest.
