= Seely baronets =

Baronetcy in the Baronetage of the United Kingdom

- Escutcheon of the Seely baronets of Sherwood Lodge and Brook House
- Creation date: 1896
- Status: dormant
- Motto: In Deo spero
- Arms: Azure, three ears of wheat banded or between two martlets in pale, and as many wreaths of roses in fesse argent
- Crest: In front of three ears of wheat banded or, the trunk of a tree fessewise eradicated and sprouting in the dexter, proper

The Seely baronetcy, of Sherwood Lodge in Arnold in the County of Nottingham and Brook House in Brooke on the Isle of Wight, is a title in the Baronetage of the United Kingdom. It was created on 19 February 1896 for the industrialist Charles Seely (1833–1915), son and namesake of Charles Seely (1803–1887).

The 1st Baronet's grandson, the third Baronet, was created Baron Sherwood, of Calverton in the County of Nottingham, in the Peerage of the United Kingdom in 1941. The peerage became extinct on his death without heir, but he was succeeded in the baronetcy by his younger brother, the 4th Baronet.

The title is marked "vacant" by the Official Roll.

== Seely baronets, of Sherwood Lodge and Brooke House (1896) ==
- Sir Charles Seely, 1st Baronet (1833–1915)
- Sir Charles Hilton Seely, 2nd Baronet (1859–1926)
- Sir Hugh Michael Seely, 3rd Baronet (1898–1970) (created Baron Sherwood in 1941)

=== Barons Sherwood (1941) ===
- Hugh Michael Seely, 1st Baron Sherwood (1898–1970) succeeded in the baronetcy only by his brother.

=== Seely baronets, of Sherwood Lodge and Brooke House (1896; reverted) ===
- Sir Victor Basil John Seely, 4th Baronet (1900–1980) succeeded by his eldest son
- Sir Nigel Edward Seely, 5th Baronet (1923–2019) succeeded by his nephewref name="Debrett"/>
- Sir William Victor Conway Seely, presumed 6th Baronet (born 1983).ref name="Debrett"/>

== Extended family ==
The soldier and Liberal politician Jack Seely, 1st Baron Mottistone, was the fourth son of the 1st Baronet.

== See also ==
- Baron Mottistone

== Notes ==
Baronetage of the United Kingdom
Preceded by Boord baronets	Seely baronets of Sherwood Lodge and Brook House; 19 February 1896	Succeeded by Cave baronets
