= Nigel Seely =

Baronet (1923–2019)

Sir Nigel Edward Seely, 5th Baronet (28 July 1923 – 25 April 2019) was the 5th baronet of the Seely family, of Sherwood Lodge, Nottinghamshire, and grandson of Sir Charles Hilton Seely, 2nd Baronet.

Seely was educated at Stowe School and worked for Dorland International until his retirement.

== Notes ==
Baronetage of the United Kingdom
Preceded by Victor Seely	Baronet (of Sherwood Lodge and Brooke House); 1980–2019	Succeeded by William Seely
