= Ben Bradley (politician) =

English Conservative politician (born 1989)

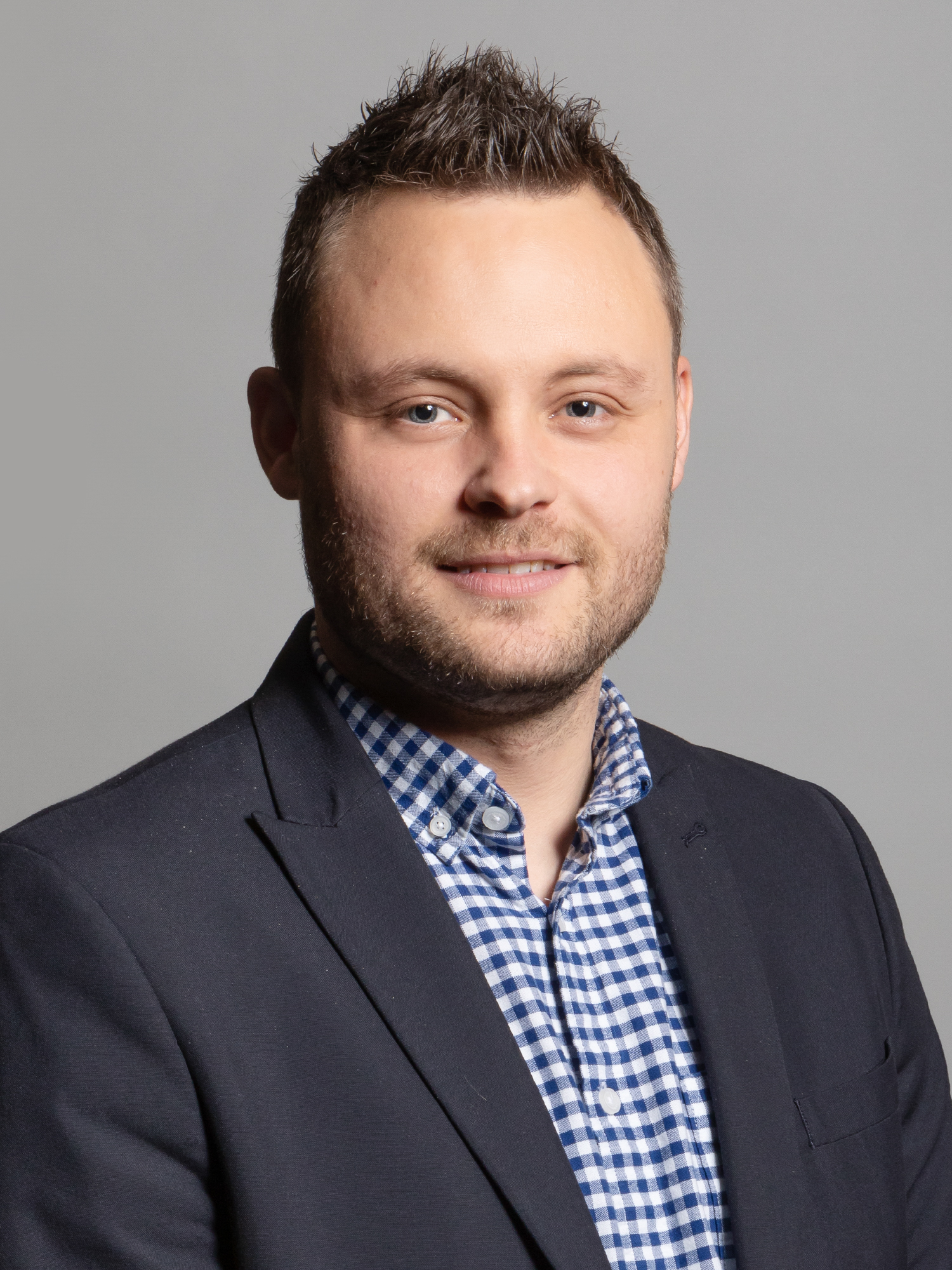
- Official portrait, 2020

Member of Parliament for Mansfield
- In office 8 June 2017 – 30 May 2024
- Preceded by: Sir Alan Meale
- Succeeded by: Steve Yemm

Leader of Nottinghamshire County Council
- In office 27 May 2021 – 5 December 2024
- Preceded by: Kay Cutts
- Succeeded by: Sam Smith

Member of Nottinghamshire County Council for Hucknall North
- In office 4 May 2017 – September 2017
- Succeeded by: John Wilmott

Member of Nottinghamshire County Council for Mansfield North
- In office 6 May 2021 – 1 May 2025

Personal details
- Born: 11 December 1989 (age 36) Ripley, Derbyshire, England
- Party: Reform UK (2025–present)
- Other political affiliations: Conservative (until 2025)
- Spouse: Shanade Bradley (m. 2015)
- Children: 2
- Education: Nottingham Trent University
- Occupation: Politician
- Website: Ben Bradley MP (archived)

Benjamin David Bradley (born 11 December 1989) is a British politician who served as the Conservative Member of Parliament (MP) for Mansfield from 2017 to 2024.

Bradley was an elected member at Nottinghamshire County Council from May 2017, having also served as leader of that council from 2021 to 2024. In December, Bradley was announced as a Cabinet member for the remaining months until the May 2025 Nottinghamshire County Council election. He was previously a ward councillor on Ashfield District Council from May 2015 to September 2017.

== Early life ==
Bradley was born on 11 December 1989 in Ripley, Derbyshire, to Chris, a police officer, and Sally Bradley, a public servant. He was privately educated at Derby Grammar School, a selective independent school based in the western Littleover area of Derby.

Bradley briefly attended the University of Bath studying sport science relating to his hockey ambitions. He later enrolled at University of Salford, before transferring to Nottingham Trent University where he studied politics, graduating in 2013.

After university, Bradley became campaign manager and later constituency office manager for Mark Spencer, Conservative MP for Sherwood.

== Political career ==
=== Local government ===
Whilst working for Conservative MP Mark Spencer, Bradley was elected as Conservative councillor for the Hucknall North Ward on Ashfield District Council in May 2015, taking the newly created third seat for the ward following the approval of new ward boundaries. As well as working for Spencer, Bradley subsequently worked as a senior parliamentary assistant to Nick Boles, the then Conservative MP for Grantham and Stamford. In 2017, both Bradley and Mark Spender were criticised in 2017 by the Parliamentary Commissioner for Standards for misusing taxpayers' resources, such as the MP's newsletter, to link to "overtly party-political content". Bradley was sent on a training course on how to use parliamentary resources appropriately.

In 2016, Bradley incorrectly claimed that a company in India had been commissioned by Ashfield District Council to carry out a telephone survey at a cost of £17,000 when in fact it had been carried out by British company.

He was elected to Nottinghamshire County Council for the Hucknall North seat in May 2017.

Following his election as an MP, Bradley stepped down in September 2017 from his district council seat, and a by-election the following month saw the new Conservative Party candidate defeated by an Independent candidate for the vacant seat. He has been criticised by political rivals for not standing down as a county councillor following his election to Parliament on the grounds that he had missed key local votes while working in London. However, he argued that his new role as an MP meant that he had better links with which to do his job as a councillor.

At the 2021 UK local elections, Bradley became the Leader of the Nottinghamshire County Council, having been elected to the Mansfield North Division.

On 12 May 2022, at a meeting of the full Nottinghamshire County Council, Bradley was re-affirmed as leader until 2025. He was adamant that the dual-responsibilities of "...two high-profile, high-intensity roles", that of council leader and MP, had worked well during the first year.

On 2 July 2023, Bradley declared himself a candidate for the 2024 East Midlands mayoral election. He suggested that, if successful, he would only act as Mayor in the future. Bradley came in a distant second in the election to Labour candidate Claire Ward, who received over 50,000 more votes than Bradley.

In November 2024, Bradley announced he had put himself forward to be the Conservative candidate for the 2025 Greater Lincolnshire mayoral election. He made it onto a six-man shortlist for the position, but missed out on the nomination which went to Rob Waltham following a selection event at Lincoln's Bishop Grosseteste University in December 2024.

On 11 December 2024, Bradley was announced as Nottinghamshire Cabinet member for education, special educational needs and disabilities (SEND), a role previously held by Sam Smith before being installed as leader on 5 December.

In November 2024, Bradley announced he would imminently leave his position as Notts County Leader, allowing transition to a replacement by 5 December, and would actively seek other sources of remuneration which would be incompatible with his Leader's position. He cited his disappointment at losing two elections – as the new East Midlands Mayor soon followed by polling for Mansfield's MP – and the need to provide for his family's future.

In November 2026 Bradley announced his intention to stand for the Beacon Ward at Newark and Sherwood Council local elections in May 2027.

=== Parliament ===
Bradley was selected as the Conservative candidate for Mansfield for the June 2017 snap general election. He overturned a Labour majority of 5,315 to become the first ever Conservative MP for the seat. The constituency had been represented by the Labour Party's Alan Meale since 1987 – before Bradley was born. Labour had held this seat since 1923. Aged 27, he was one of the youngest MPs elected in the 2017 general election, despite the acting Returning Officer wrongly announcing Meale as the victor.

On 8 January 2018, during Theresa May's cabinet reshuffle, Bradley was appointed as the Vice-Chair for Youth at CCHQ. He later submitted his letter of resignation from this position on 10 July 2018 in protest at her strategy for delivering Brexit.

Shortly after becoming Conservative Party Vice Chair in 2018, Bradley apologised after facing criticism for a 2012 blog post in which he disparaged the unemployed and suggested measures to prevent them from having children. In 2018, he also apologised for a 2011 social media post advocating police violence, made shortly after the killing of Mark Duggan, which sparked nationwide riots. Further controversy arose in 2018 when Labour criticised a 2011 blog post in which he dismissed public sector workers' concerns about pay and conditions, suggesting they find other jobs.

In February 2018, Bradley falsely accused Jeremy Corbyn of sharing British secrets with communist spies in the 1980s. Corbyn threatened legal action for libel, prompting Bradley to delete the tweet, issue a full apology, and cover Corbyn's legal costs. He also agreed to donate a substantial sum to charity, with the money split between a homeless charity and a food bank in his Mansfield constituency. Two Conservative donors covered the £15,000 donation on his behalf.

In June 2018, BuzzFeed reported on emails sent by Bradley in 2016, wherein Bradley berated a local journalist, and threatened to cut off media access to the local branch of the Conservative party. This was in response to the journalist approaching Bradley for a comment on a series of Islamophobic posts made on a Conservative councillor's Facebook page. Bradley's response accused the journalist of 'childish backstabbing', as well as 'colluding' with the Labour Party, and described the Islamophobia story as 'crap'.

Bradley sat on the Education Select Committee conducting Inquiries in to Special Educational Needs amongst other issues, and on the All-party Parliamentary groups for Ending Homelessness, Coalfields, Youth Services and Skills and Employment.

On 14 December 2021, Bradley broke the party whip to vote against elements of the government's 'Plan B' COVID-19 restrictions, which included vaccine passports and mandatory COVID-19 vaccination of NHS staff. However, he voted in favour of the expansion of laws requiring face coverings to be worn in public places.

At the 2024 general election, Bradley lost his seat in the House of Commons, losing out by 3,485 votes to the Labour candidate, Steve Yemm.

Bradley had been referred to as "three jobs"', concerning his roles as MP, as Leader of Nottinghamshire County Council and County Councillor for Mansfield North division.

== Post-parliamentary career ==
Since leaving Parliament, Bradley was appointed as Head of Communications and Engagement at the UK Atomic Energy Authority.

Bradley defected to Reform UK on 11 December 2025. Based on his former county council leadership and MP experience, Bradley will have a remit to work with regional mayors and councils in Reform UK's "department of government efficiency", known as Doge, following a 2025 United States initiative.

== Personal life ==
Bradley married his wife, Shanade, in 2015 and the couple have two sons.

Bradley played hockey at university level and has hockey coaching qualifications.

Parliament of the United Kingdom
| Preceded by Sir Alan Meale | Member of Parliament for Mansfield; 2017–2024 | Succeeded by Steve Yemm |
