= Steve Yemm =

British politician

Steve Yemm MP
- Official portrait, 2026

Member of Parliament for Mansfield
- Incumbent
- Assumed office 4 July 2024
- Preceded by: Ben Bradley
- Majority: 3,485 (8.5%)

Personal details
- Born: Stephen Yemm; January 1964 (age 62)
- Party: Labour
- Education: University of Nottingham (BSc)

Stephen Yemm (born January 1964) is a British Labour Party politician who has been Member of Parliament for Mansfield since 2024.

== Early life and career ==
Born in Rainworth to a mining family, Yemm was educated at The Brunts Academy, then a comprehensive school, afterwards receiving a Bachelor of Science degree in Applied Chemistry from the University of Nottingham.

He was the Labour candidate in the 2011 Mansfield mayoral election, and was defeated by Mansfield Independent Forum's candidate, sitting mayor Tony Egginton, by a majority of 67 votes after second preference voting.

Prior to becoming an MP, Yemm worked in IT and was a long-term chairman of Mansfield's local Labour group between 2008 and 2017.

== Parliamentary career ==
In March 2023 Yemm was selected as the Labour Party candidate for Mansfield.

Yemm was elected as Member of Parliament for Mansfield at the 2024 general election, defeating his Conservative predecessor Ben Bradley.

In January 2025, Yemm called on the UK Government to release surplus funds from the British Coal Staff Superannuation Scheme to support former mineworkers and their families. This followed the government's earlier decision to release £1.5 billion from the Mineworkers’ Pension Scheme.

In April 2025, Yemm apologised and referred himself to the Parliamentary Commissioner for Standards after failing to declare a £10,000 donation from Power Saving Solutions, a business within his constituency area, while praising the company in a House of Commons speech about construction standards.

== Personal life ==
Yemm has three adult daughters with his wife, a consultant radiographer at Kings Mill Hospital. He has lived in Mansfield all his life.
