= Alan Meale =

British politician

Sir Alan Meale

Parliamentary Under-Secretary of State for the Environment
- In office 6 May 1997 – 29 July 1999
- Prime Minister: Tony Blair
- Preceded by: Position established
- Succeeded by: Chris Mullin

Member of Parliament for Mansfield
- In office 11 June 1987 – 3 May 2017
- Preceded by: Don Concannon
- Succeeded by: Ben Bradley

Personal details
- Born: 31 July 1949 (age 77) Bishop Auckland, County Durham, England
- Party: Labour
- Spouse: Diana Gilhespy
- Education: Durham University; Sheffield Hallam University
- Website: Alan Meale MP (Archived)

Sir Joseph Alan Meale (born 31 July 1949) is a former British Labour Party politician who was the Member of Parliament (MP) for Mansfield from 1987 to 2017. He was the longest-standing MP in Mansfield's history.

== Early life ==
Meale attended St Joseph RC School in Bishop Auckland and studied at Ruskin College (in Oxford), and Durham University, his CV also mentions Sheffield Hallam University.

Meale's website lists his previous occupations as author, editor, development officer, trade union official, researcher, political adviser and journalist.

== Parliamentary career ==
Meale entered Parliament on 11 June 1987 and made his maiden speech on 3 July 1987 in the Tourism debate where he commented on the poverty, lack of provision, opportunity and services in the Mansfield community. Meale was a whip from 1992 to 1994 when he became Parliamentary Private Secretary to John Prescott in Prescott's different portfolios until 1998.

Meale served as Parliamentary Under-Secretary of State, Department of the Environment, Transport and the Regions under John Prescott from January 1998 to January 1999. He became a government whip Council of Europe Delegation in 2007 and acting Leader of the UK Delegation in 2010. He has been the chair of the British Section of the Commonwealth Parliamentary Association Cyprus Group since 2007.

In 1998, Michael Ancram accused Meale of "cronyism" following allegations in The Sunday Times that he had lobbied on behalf of Anthony Kleanthous, the millionaire Greek-Cypriot chairman of Barnet football club. Kleanthous wanted to build a £14 million stadium on green belt land, 140 miles from Meale's constituency. The Sunday Times article said that Britain's Greek-Cypriot lobbying groups had paid for Meale and his wife to go to Cyprus and donated thousands of pounds to Labour. Meale denied cronyism, whilst Kleanthos insisted he had not donated to the Labour party and said it was "a bit racist" to link his business interests to Greek-Cypriot political lobbying efforts based on his ethnicity.

Meale was Vice Chair of the APPG for Cyprus, and was regarded by Greek Cypriot groups as one of their "oldest and closest friends in Parliament". According to Meale, he first became interested in the political situation in Cyprus back in 1987 when Tony Benn advised him to "pick a political issue and stick with it".

In the run-up to the UK referendum on membership of the European Union, Meale campaigned to remain in the EU.

=== Expenses ===
Meale was mentioned in the Parliamentary expenses scandal having claimed £13,000 over four years for gardening. The limit set retrospectively by Sir Thomas Legg was £1,000 /year. The Legg Report showed that Meale repaid £11,859.47.

=== Alternative medicine ===
Meale was one of sixteen MPs to sign an early day motion tabled by Conservative MP David Tredinnick regretting the British Medical Association's opposition to further National Health Service funding of homoeopathy.

=== Loss of seat ===
Meale lost his seat at the 2017 general election when Ben Bradley overturned a 2015 Labour majority of 5,315 to become the first ever Conservative MP for the seat. Labour had held this seat since 1923 and the constituency had been represented by Meale since 1987 – before Bradley was born - making the latter one of the youngest MPs elected, despite the acting returning officer wrongly announcing Meale as the victor. In 2012, Mansfield's local newspaper, the Chad, reported that Meale was the longest-standing MP in Mansfield's history, overtaking Bernard Taylor who was the incumbent MP for 25 years.

== Local politics ==
In 2007 Meale stood for the position of Mayor of Mansfield, losing significantly to sitting mayor Tony Egginton, polling a total of 8,784 votes compared to Egginton's 13,720.

== Personal life ==
Meale married Diana Gilhespy on 10 March 1983, his second wife; he has a son and daughter from his first marriage in 1970. Meale was knighted by Prince Charles officiating at the ceremony in January, 2012, after the 2011 Birthday Honours list was announced, chosen for his "public and political service".
