= Markham & Co. =

Markham & Co. Ltd
- Industry: Heavy Engineering
- Predecessor: J&W Oliver
- Founded: 1889 (as Markham & Co.)
- Defunct: 1998
- Fate: Taken over
- Successor: Davy Markham
- Headquarters: Chesterfield
- Products: Coal winder, Valves, Tunneling M/c
- Parent: John Brown, Kvaerner

Markham & Co. was an ironworks and steelworks company near Chesterfield, Derbyshire, England.

== History ==
The Victoria Foundry near Chesterfield, Derbyshire was owned and run by William Oliver and his father John Oliver from the mid-1850s until 1862 when, following the death of the father, it became the sole property of William. The Victoria Foundry, located at what was formerly Shepley's Yard, relocated to a greenfield site at Broad Oaks Meadows, south east of the town centre close by the Midland Railway’s main line. Disaster hit the business in 1885, a slump in the coal and iron trades and the high overheads of the new factory and equipment undermined the firm and the following year Oliver called in the receivers. In 1889 the business was sold to industrialist Charles Paxton Markham and became Markham & Co. Ltd.

Mining. Markham's continued the business of building winding engines for collieries begun by Oliver and supplied many collieries in Nottinghamshire, Derbyshire and South Yorkshire. So well known were Markham's products that in the ten years from 1927, in a time of economic depression, the Markham works built 20 winding engines for gold mines in South Africa, giving the Chesterfield workforce regular work in a difficult period.

By 1948, the company had built more than 200 steam and electric winding engines and associated machinery for the home and export markets including a mine winder with a 34 feet diameter drum, 7 feet larger than the ones which made William Oliver move to new premises.

The company diversified over the years and in 1948 the Broad Oaks works were making haulage gears, rolling mills and ancillary equipment, steel girders, large steel-framed buildings, light alloy extrusion presses, spun cast iron plant, blast furnace plant, large iron castings and research equipment in addition to its involvement in turbine and tunnelling operations.

Tunnelling. In the early years of the 20th century the company built and supplied tunnelling equipment for the construction of London's new (deep tunnel) Underground, the Mersey Tunnel and during the 1930s the Moscow Underground. The tunnelling equipment was a success and more orders followed, post-war productions included tunnelling shields for the Dartford Tunnel under the River Thames and in the 1980s for the Channel Tunnel designed and manufactured by a joint venture between Robbins Company of Kent, Washington, USA and Kawasaki Heavy Industries of Japan.

War Time works During the Second World War the firm worked on several secret projects including building X craft submarines for Vickers-Armstrong. They built X22 Exploit, X 23 Xphias, XE 11 Lucifer, XE 12 Excitable. Others were built by Marshalls of Gainsborough and Broadbent of Huddersfield.

Markhams built a large number of presses for Loewy during the war for other firms making components for the war effort, as well as gun barrel turning lathes and rifling machines for Cravens Ltd, a sister company.

== Company sale ==
In 1925, Charles Paxton Markham reconstituted his company as part of the Staveley Coal and Iron Company ensuring its future. The following year, Charles Paxton Markham died and ownership of the company changed again. By 1937, the firm had been bought by Sheffield-based steel makers and engineers John Brown & Company for £50,000, the Chesterfield works continuing operations as before. John Brown was taken over by Trafalgar House, who also owned the Cleveland Bridge & Engineering Company. Trafalgar House was subsequently taken over by the Kvaerner Group of Norway in 1996. The works was closed by Kvaerner in 1998 and the site redeveloped for housing following a sale by the firm who took over John Brown's parent company.

In 2006 Markham's merged with former Trafalgar House engineering subsidiary Davy in Sheffield to form Davy Markham, specialising in large engineering fabrications and machining works, from the Davy site in Sheffield. Davy Markham worked on the fabrication of the "B of the Bang" sculpture installed outside the City of Manchester Stadium in Manchester, England. This was the tallest sculpture in the UK until it was dismantled.

In February 2018 Davy Markham went into administration after getting into financial difficulties. After a brief period of trading while in administration, its employees were made redundant. The company was dissolved in June 2021.

== Products ==
- Mine winders - 280 between 1869 & 1998
  - Steam-powered - 140 built 1869 and 1938
  - Electric-powered - 140 built 1938 to 1998
- Tunnelling machines - 516 shield & TBMs
  - London Underground
  - Moscow Underground
  - Channel tunnel
- Steam locomotives, including one that later worked on the Waltham Iron Ore Tramway and an 0-4-0 Vertical boiler locomotive that is currently on display at the Tasmanian Transport Museum.
- Water turbines
- Castmaster die casting machine
- A spun pipe caster for Staveley Iron Works under licence
- Stowing machines - for backfilling mines
- TLP test rig for oil platform anchor tendons
- Subcontract machining and engineering
  - Trunnions for the Thames Barrier
  - Nuclear reactor refuelling machine parts
- Machine tools
- Mini submarines
