= 1916 Mansfield by-election =

UK Parliamentary by-election

The 1916 Mansfield by-election was held on 20 September 1916. The by-election was held due to the death of the incumbent Liberal MP, Arthur Markham. It was won by the Liberal candidate Charles Seely.

== Vacancy ==
Markham

The by-election was held due to the death of the incumbent Liberal MP, Arthur Markham.

== Result ==
The seat was held for the Liberals.

1916 Mansfield by-election
Party	Candidate	Votes	%	±%
Liberal	Charles Seely	7,597	63.0	−10.0
Independent	Arthur Turnbull*	4,456	37.0	New
Majority		3,141	26.0	−20.0
Turnout		12,053	48.7	−25.2
Liberal hold		Swing		

- supported by Horatio Bottomley
