= Charles Paxton Markham =

English industrialist and civic leader (1865–1926)

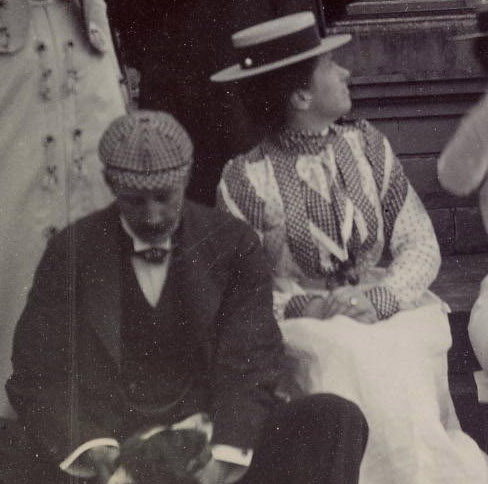
- Charles Paxton Markham and his sister Violet Markham (c. 1903)

Mayor of Chesterfield
- In office 1896–1896
- In office 1909–1910

Personal details
- Born: 14 April 1865 Brimington, Derbyshire, England
- Died: 29 June 1926 (aged 61) Derbyshire, England
- Relatives: Violet Markham (sister), Sir Arthur Markham, 1st Baronet (brother)
- Occupation: Industrialist; engineer; colliery owner

Charles Paxton Markham (14 April 1865 – 29 June 1926) was an English industrialist and civic leader in Derbyshire. He served on Chesterfield's local authority for many years and was Mayor of Chesterfield on multiple occasions, and was associated with major local coal and engineering enterprises including the Staveley Coal and Iron Company and the firm later known as Markham & Co. He was the eldest son of Charles Markham and Rosa Markham (daughter of Sir Joseph Paxton).

He became Director of the Staveley Coal & Iron Company after the death of his father in 1888 and founded the engineering firm Markham & Co. in 1889.

== Early life and family ==
Markham was born in 1865 in Brimington, near Chesterfield, into a Derbyshire industrial family. He was the son of Charles Markham, a co-owner of the Markham Collieries and the engineering firm Markham & Co., and the grandson, on his mother's side, of Sir Joseph Paxton, the designer of the Crystal Palace for the Great Exhibition of 1851.

After the death of his father in 1888, he joined the board of the Staveley Coal and Iron Company and remained connected with the company for the rest of his life.

== Industrial career ==
In 1889, Markham purchased the Broad Oaks Foundry in Chesterfield; the site later developed into a major engineering works manufacturing heavy industrial and mining equipment.

Markham also held senior positions within the Staveley Coal and Iron Company. Archival catalogue descriptions note his long tenure and the company's emphasis on coal production and industrial expansion during the late 19th and early 20th centuries. Academic research on the company's governance and published accounts discusses decision-making during the period of his leadership. He also had business interests in South Yorkshire and Derbyshire.

== Civic life ==
Markham served on Chesterfield's local authority for approximately 25 years and held three terms as mayor, including in 1896 and again in 1909 and 1910. He was High Sheriff of Derbyshire in 1914 and chairman of the Chesterfield County Bench of magistrates.

In recognition of his public service, he was admitted as an Honorary Freeman of the Borough of Chesterfield.

== Death ==
Markham died suddenly at his home in Ringwood Hall, Hollingwood near Chesterfield, on 29 June 1926, having had a seizure the previous week. He had recently returned from honeymoon, having married his second wife, Frances Marjery Markham, in October 1925. He left her £600,000 in his will, published in September 1926, the approximate equivalent in 2025 of £32 million. His obituary in the Stoke-on-Trent newspaper, The Evening Sentinel, noted that he was a man of "marked individuality".

== Tapton estate gift ==
In 1925, Markham presented the Tapton estate, including parkland, to Chesterfield's local authority for public benefit. Subsequent reporting has discussed the estate gift in the context of its later management and public use.

== Other recognition ==
A portrait of Markham, reflecting his industrial leadership, is held in a public collection and catalogued by Art UK.
