= Don Concannon =

British politician (1930–2003)

John Dennis Concannon PC (16 May 1930 – 14 December 2003), known as Don Concannon, was a British Labour Party politician.

Born in Doncaster, West Riding of Yorkshire, Concannon was educated at Rossington Secondary School and through the Extra-Mural Department of the University of Nottingham. He worked as a miner and as a National Union of Mineworkers (NUM) official. He was a councillor on Mansfield Borough Council from 1963.

Concannon was elected as the Member of Parliament for Mansfield at the 1966 election. Under Harold Wilson and James Callaghan (Prime Minister from 1976 to 1979), he served as a government whip and as Northern Ireland minister, and was appointed a member of the Privy Council in 1978. He was sponsored by the NUM.

A serious car accident led to his retirement as MP for Mansfield at the 1987 election; Alan Meale succeeded him in the seat.

Concannon died in Mansfield on 14 December 2003, aged 73.

Parliament of the United Kingdom
Preceded by Bernard Taylor	Member of Parliament for Mansfield; 1966–1987	Succeeded by Alan Meale
Political offices
Preceded by Paul Hawkins	Vice-Chamberlain of the Household; 1974	Succeeded by James Hamilton
Preceded by Jack Donaldson	Under-Secretary of State for Northern Ireland; 1974–1976; With: Jack Donaldson	Succeeded by Raymond Carter; James Dunn
Preceded by Roland Moyle	Minister of State for Northern Ireland; 1976–1979; With: Roland Moyle 1976; The Lord Melchett 1976–1979	Succeeded by Hugh Rossi; Michael Alison
