= Charles Brown (Labour politician) =

British politician

Member of Parliament for Mansfield
- In office 1929–1940

Personal details
- Born: 1884 Cromford, Derbyshire, England
- Died: 22 December 1940 (aged 56)
- Party: Labour

Charles Brown (1884 – 22 December 1940) was a British Labour Party politician.

Born in Cromford in Derbyshire, Brown became a hosiery worker in Sutton-in-Ashfield. He was involved in the labour movement, as an educational organiser for the National Council of Labour Colleges. In 1925, he was elected to Sutton-in-Ashfield Urban District Council, and in 1928, to Nottinghamshire County Council.

Brown was elected in the 1929 general election as Member of Parliament (MP) for Mansfield in Nottinghamshire, and held the seat until his death in 1940, at the age of 56.

Parliament of the United Kingdom
Preceded by Frank Bradley Varley	Member of Parliament for Mansfield; 1929 – 1940	Succeeded by Bernard Taylor
