= Bernard Taylor, Baron Taylor of Mansfield =

British coalminer and politician

Harry Bernard Taylor, Baron Taylor of Mansfield, CBE, JP (18 September 1895 – 11 April 1991) was a British politician. He was the Member of Parliament (MP) on behalf of the Labour Party representing Mansfield for 25 years. He was then a member of the House of Lords for a further 25 years.

== Mining ==
Taylor was from a mining family in Mansfield Woodhouse in Nottinghamshire and left school at 14 to work at the Sherwood Colliery. After working at the coalface for several years, he was promoted to be a checkweighman. He was a conscientious objector in the First World War.

== Politics ==
A member of the Miners' Federation of Great Britain, Taylor also joined the Labour Party. He was elected to Mansfield-Woodhouse Urban District Council in 1925, also serving on the Board of Guardians. From the 1929 general election he was Election Agent for Mansfield Constituency Labour Party, and organised the successful election campaigns of Charles Brown.

Taylor kept the Mansfield seat Labour despite the electoral disaster of 1931 and in slightly more favourable times in 1935. That year he had himself been elected to Nottinghamshire County Council, and he was president of the Nottinghamshire Miners' Association in 1936–37, and vice-president of the Notts Miners' Federated Union from 1937 to 1941.

== Parliament ==
Mansfield's Labour MP Charles Brown died just before Christmas 1940. Taylor was his obvious successor and he was elected unopposed at a by-election in April 1941. He was Parliamentary Private Secretary to Ben Smith, who was Parliamentary Secretary to the Ministry of Aircraft Production in the wartime coalition government.

== Ministerial office ==
Much of Taylor's concerns related to the welfare problems of miners and in the post-war Labour government he was Parliamentary Private Secretary to Jim Griffiths, the Minister of National Insurance. While this job normally entailed managing relations between the Minister and Parliamentary colleagues, Taylor also accompanied Griffiths on trips in the country. He was promoted to be Parliamentary Secretary in the Ministry of National Insurance in March 1950, after the 1950 general election, and served until the Labour government went out of office in October 1951.

== Political outlook ==
In opposition, Taylor continued to take up issues such as workers' compensation for industrial injuries and improved welfare benefits. He often spoke on mining issues. During the Labour Party split in the early 1950s, Taylor sided with the left and Aneurin Bevan, opposing German rearmament and the development of the Hydrogen bomb. However, he was critical of the Soviet action in Hungary in 1956 and thereafter. Following the Cuban Missile Crisis, he was one of the MPs who signed a letter calling on U.S. President John F. Kennedy to withdraw Polaris and Thor missiles from the UK as a gesture in response to Soviet premier Nikita Khrushchev withdrawing Soviet missiles from Cuba.

== Peerage ==
Taylor announced his retirement at the age of 70 in December 1965. It was announced that he would be made a life peer in the dissolution honours after the 1966 general election, and was created Baron Taylor of Mansfield, of Mansfield in the County of Nottingham on 1 June 1966. He had already been appointed a Commander of the Order of the British Empire (CBE) in the 1966 New Year Honours.

Taylor wrote his memoirs, "Uphill All the Way", in 1973.

In 2012, Mansfield's local newspaper, the Chad, reported that Sir Alan Meale had become the longest-standing MP in Mansfield's history, overtaking Taylor. Meale was the incumbent MP for 30 years, until the 2017 general election.

== House of Lords ==
In 1971 Taylor joined with Lord Blyton (another former miner MP made a Peer) to divide the House of Lords against the Industrial Relations Bill, a move of which the Labour whips did not approve. He voted for divorce reform but against legalised euthanasia. In the short Parliament of 1974 he was chosen to move the motion for an humble address in reply to the Queen's Speech. During the Common Market referendum campaign of 1975, Taylor campaigned for a 'No' vote.

He was a diligent attender in the Lords, even in his 90s. In the 1988-89 session, Taylor attended 133 of 153 sitting days.

== Family ==
Taylor married Clara, daughter of John Ashley, in 1921. They had one son. She died in 1983.

After his wife's death, Taylor became friendly with Ellen Baylis. She later moved into his council house with him and partnered with him on public duties.

Parliament of the United Kingdom
Preceded by Charles Brown	Member of Parliament for Mansfield; 1941–1966	Succeeded by Don Concannon
Political offices
Preceded by Tom Steele	Parliamentary Secretary to the Ministry of National Insurance; 1950–1951	Office abolished
Trade union offices
Preceded by Herbert Booth	President of the Nottinghamshire Miners' Association; 1937	Succeeded by George Alfred Spencer
