= Sir Charles Seely, 2nd Baronet =

British politician

Sir Charles Hilton Seely, 2nd Baronet, VD, KGStJ (7 July 1859 – 26 February 1926), was a British industrialist, landowner and Liberal Unionist (later Liberal Party) politician who served as Member of Parliament (MP) for Lincoln from 1895 to 1906 and for Mansfield from 1916 to 1918. He was a Justice of the Peace for Hampshire and Nottinghamshire and the Deputy Lieutenant for Nottinghamshire. He was also a Knight of Grace of the Order of St John.

== Early life ==
Seely was born in Mansfield, Nottinghamshire, the eldest son of Sir Charles Seely, 1st Baronet (1833–1915), an industrialist and major land-owner in both Nottinghamshire and the Isle of Wight. He was educated at Harrow School and Trinity College, Cambridge, and inherited the family estates at Sherwood Lodge in Nottinghamshire, and Gatcombe in the Isle of Wight.

== Political career ==
Seely was a Liberal Unionist for the early part of his political career. He first stood for election to Parliament at the 1886 general election, when he unsuccessfully contested Mid Derbyshire. He stood for Rushcliffe at the 1892 election without success, but won a seat in Lincoln at the 1895 election, which his grandfather Charles Seely had represented until 1885 as a Liberal. He was re-elected again in 1900 with Conservative backing. However, in February 1904 he lost the backing of the local Conservative and Liberal Unionist Association over his support for free trade. The Conservatives adopted Henry Page Croft as their candidate in place of Seely, who stood in the 1906 general election as a Free Trade candidate.

Despite this setback, he again stood for Lincoln in the General Election of January 1910 as a Liberal Unionist in support of Free Trade and was again opposed by a Liberal and a Conservative. This time he finished in third place and did not stand for Parliament again for another six years. He instead served as High Sheriff of Nottinghamshire for 1912.

He was the successful Liberal Party candidate at a by-election in September 1916 in the Mansfield division of Nottinghamshire. At the 1918 general election, after boundary changes, he stood in the new Broxtowe division of Nottinghamshire, but the seat was won with a large majority by the Labour Party candidate. Seely did not stand for Parliament again.

Seely was a lieutenant-colonel in the 5th (Isle of Wight, "Princess Beatrice′s") Volunteer Battalion, Hampshire Regiment, and was awarded the Volunteer Officers' Decoration (VD) on 15 August 1902.

== Family ==
Seely was a member of a family of politicians, industrialists and significant landowners. His grandfather Charles Seely (1803–1887), father Sir Charles Seely, 1st Baronet, younger brother John Edward Bernard Seely, 1st Baron Mottistone, and son Sir Hugh Seely, 3rd Baronet and 1st Baron Sherwood were all Members of Parliament. His uncle was the civil engineer, businessman and politician Sir Francis Evans, 1st Baronet.

Seely married Hilda Lucy (née Grant), granddaughter of the notable inventor Sir Thomas Tassell Grant KCB, FRS, in 1891, and they had six children:

- Violet Lucy Emily Seely (1892–1979), who married the 2nd Viscount Allendale, a grandson of the 5th Marquess of Londonderry. Violet's grandson is George William Beaumont Howard, the current and 13th Earl of Carlisle whose principal family seat was Castle Howard.
- Charles Grant Seely (1894–1917), killed in action in World War I at the Second Battle of Gaza, and commemorated in St Olave's Church, Gatcombe, on the Isle of Wight.
- Sir Hugh Seely (1898–1970), 3rd Baronet and 1st Baron Sherwood, who became an MP and a government minister
- Ivy Angela Seely MBE (born 1898)
- Victor Basil John Seely (1900–1980), who inherited the baronetcy on the death of his brother Hugh, and whose son SIr Nigel Edward Seely (b. 1923) is the 5th of the Seely baronets
- Squadron Leader Nigel Richard William Seely (1902–1943), who married Isabella Elinor Margarete von Rieben, of the old noble family of von Rieben. He was killed in action in World War II, and was buried at St Mary's Church, Brook, on the Isle of Wight. Their son Hilton Nigel Matthew Seely married 1971 Leonie Mary Taylor, daughter of Brigadier George Taylor CBE, DSO & Bar, KHS

Sir Charles died in Basford aged 66.

== See also ==
- Seely baronets

Parliament of the United Kingdom
Preceded by William Crosfield	Member of Parliament for Lincoln; 1895–1906	Succeeded by Charles Roberts
Preceded by Sir Arthur Markham, Bt	Member of Parliament for Mansfield; 1916–1918	Succeeded by William Carter
Baronetage of the United Kingdom
Preceded by Charles Seely	Baronet (of Sherwood Lodge and Brooke House); 1915–1926	Succeeded by Hugh Seely
