= Mansfield (constituency) =

Parliamentary constituency in the United Kingdom, 1885 onwards

Coordinates: 53.14°N 1.20°W

- County constituency for the House of Commons
- Interactive map of boundaries from 2024
- Location within the East Midlands
- County: Nottinghamshire
- Electorate: 74,680 (March 2020)
- Major settlements: Mansfield, Mansfield Woodhouse, Market Warsop

Current constituency
- Created: 1885
- Member of Parliament: Steve Yemm (Labour)
- Seats: One
- Created from: North Nottinghamshire

Mansfield is a constituency (Note: A county constituency (for the purposes of election expenses and type of returning officer)), created in 1885, represented in the House of Commons of the UK Parliament since 2024 by Steve Yemm of the Labour Party, who gained the seat at the 2024 general election from the Conservative Party. (Note: As with all constituencies, the constituency elects one Member of Parliament (MP) by the first past the post system of election at least every five years.) Between 2017 and 2024 the seat was represented by a Conservative, Ben Bradley, for the first and only time since its creation in 1885.

The seat, centred on Mansfield in Nottinghamshire, in recent times has been considered a relatively marginal seat.

The Mansfield council area voted with more than 70% to Leave the European Union in the 2016 referendum. In 2019, the Conservatives received 63.9% of the vote in the formerly safe Labour constituency.

== Constituency profile ==
Mansfield is a constituency in Nottinghamshire. Its primary settlement is the large town of Mansfield; taken with the contiguous town of Mansfield Woodhouse, it has a population of around 100,000. The constituency also includes the small town of Market Warsop to the north of Mansfield.

Mansfield is a historic market town that was reliant on the coal mining industry for most of the 20th century. The United Kingdom government's Coal Authority, which owns most of the country's unworked and former coal mines, is headquartered in the town. Market Warsop and its nearby villages also have a history of coal mining. The constituency has high levels of deprivation, especially in the centre of Mansfield and in Market Warsop. Mansfield Woodhouse is wealthier and Mansfield's southern suburbs are affluent. House prices in the constituency are lower than the rest of the East Midlands and the average price is around half the national average.

In general, residents of Mansfield have low levels of education and income, and the child poverty rate is higher than the country as a whole. Few work in professional occupations and a high proportion work in the retail and manufacturing sectors. White people made up 95% of the population at the 2021 census.

At the local district council, most of the town is represented by the Labour Party with some Conservatives elected in the wealthier southern suburbs. At the county council, which held elections in 2025, most of the town elected Reform UK councillors. Voters in Mansfield overwhelmingly supported leaving the European Union in the 2016 referendum; an estimated 71% supported Brexit compared to 52% nationwide, making Mansfield one of the top twenty most leave-supporting constituencies out of 650 across the United Kingdom according to Electoral Calculus.

== Boundaries ==
=== Historic ===
1885–1918: The sessional division of Mansfield (except the parishes of Clipstone, Sookholme and Warsop), and the parishes of Annesley, Eastwood, Felley and Greasley in the sessional division of Nottingham.

1918–1950: The municipal borough of Mansfield, the urban district of Huthwaite, Mansfield Woodhouse, and Sutton-in-Ashfield, and the rural district of Skegby (except the parish of Sookholme).

1950–1955: The municipal borough of Mansfield and the urban district of Sutton in Ashfield.

1955–1983: The municipal borough of Mansfield and the urban districts of Mansfield Woodhouse and Warsop.

1983–2010: The Berry Hill, Broomhill, Cumberlands, Eakring, Forest Town, Ladybrook, Leeming, Lindhurst, Manor, Northfield, Oakham, Oak Tree, Pleasleyhill, Ravensdale, Sherwood and Titchfield wards of the District of Mansfield.

2010–2024: The District of Mansfield.

The Boundary Commission for England made changes to the constituency to allow for regional and local population changes by moving the small town of Market Warsop from Bassetlaw. The boundaries since the Fifth Periodic Review of Westminster constituencies (coming into effect for the 2010 general election) were coterminous with the Borough of Mansfield.

=== Current ===
Further to the 2023 review of Westminster constituencies, which came into effect for the 2024 general election, the size of the constituency was reduced slightly to bring the electorate within the permitted electoral range by transferring the Bull Farm and Pleasley Hill ward and polling district BHC in the Berry Hill ward (as they existed on 1 December 2020) to Ashfield.

Following a local government boundary review in which came into effect in May 2023, the constituency now comprises the following wards of the Borough of Mansfield from the 2024 general election:

- Bancroft; Berry Hill; Brick Kiln; Carr Bank; Central; Eakring; Grange Farm; Holly Forest Town; Hornby; Kings Walk; Kingsway Forest Town; Lindhurst (part); Ling Forest; Manor; Market Warsop; Maun Valley Forest Town; Meden; Mill Lane; Netherfield; Newlands Forest Town; Oak Tree; Oakham; Park Hall; Penniment; Racecourse; Rock Hill; Rufford (majority); Sherwood (nearly all); Southwell; Thompsons; Vale; Wainwright; Warsop Carrs; West Bank; Yeoman Hill; and a very small part of Pleasley.

The constituency covers the towns of Mansfield and Warsop, Nottinghamshire.

== History ==
The seat was created in the Redistribution of Seats Act 1885 and in the mid-19th century to the mid-20th century its economy centred on coal mining and the market town itself. Among many classes of local labourers saw organised Labour Party support, in Trade Unions, party clubs and civic society. Progression in the party's polling was heightened from the early 1920s when the seat joined many wrested from the Liberal Party, enabling the formation of the first Labour government. By length of tenure and in great majorities a safe seat status emerged for Labour (on the basis of these standard criteria) in the 1950s and 1960s. In the 1980s general elections Labour's Mansfield candidates came closer to losing to Conservatives. At the 1983 election, Labour held the seat by just over 2,000 votes – at the following, in 1987, 56 votes. That election was set against the background of the party HQ-backed miners' strike of 1984, not supported by the majority of miners in Nottinghamshire.

In the elections after 1987 until 2017, the Labour MP Alan Meale held Mansfield with relatively large majorities. He was knighted in 2012 after receiving the award in the Queen's Birthday Honours list.

At the 2005 general election, independent candidate Stewart Rickersey, a local District Councillor, took 17% of the vote, finishing in third place.

At the 2010 general election, Andre Camilleri, another candidate from Mansfield Independent Forum and previously a local councillor with special responsibility as a Cabinet Member for Mansfield District Council during 2003 to 2007, was placed fourth with 9% of the vote, above the 5% deposit threshold.

At the 2015 general election, the UKIP candidate Sid Pepper received 25% of the vote placing him third; this dropped to 5% at the 2017 election.

At the 2019 general election, Ben Bradley held Mansfield with a 16,306 majority, the highest ever for a Conservative candidate.

At the 2024 general election, Steve Yemm gained the seat for the Labour Party.

== Members of Parliament ==
North Nottinghamshire prior to 1885

| Election | Member | Party |
|---|---|---|
| 1885 | Cecil Foljambe | Liberal |
| 1892 | John Williams | Liberal |
| 1900 | Arthur Markham | Liberal |
| 1916 | Sir Charles Seely | Liberal |
| 1918 | William Carter | Labour |
| 1922 | Albert Bennett | Liberal |
| 1923 | Frank Varley | Labour |
| 1929 | Charles Brown | Labour |
| 1941 | Bernard Taylor | Labour |
| 1966 | Don Concannon | Labour |
| 1987 | Don Concannon | Moderate Labour |
| 1987 | Sir Alan Meale | Labour |
| 2017 | Ben Bradley | Conservative |
| 2024 | Steve Yemm | Labour |

== Elections ==
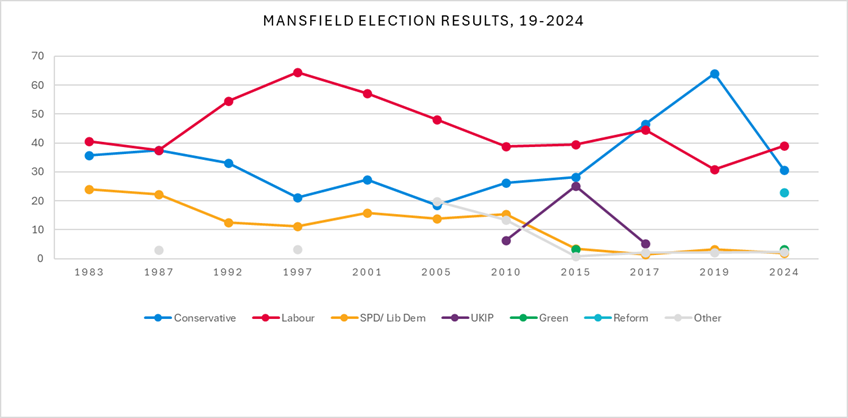
Mansfield election results 1983-2024

=== Elections in the 2020s ===
General election 2024: Mansfield
| Party | Candidate | Votes | % | ±% |
|---|---|---|---|---|
| Labour | Steve Yemm | 16,048 | 39.1 | +8.8 |
| Conservative | Ben Bradley | 12,563 | 30.6 | −33.7 |
| Reform | Matthew Warnes | 9,385 | 22.8 | N/A |
| Green | Philip Shields | 1,326 | 3.2 | N/A |
| Liberal Democrats | Michael Wyatt | 799 | 1.9 | −1.4 |
| Socialist Labour | Peter Dean | 423 | 1.0 | N/A |
| Independent | Wesley Milligan | 335 | 0.8 | N/A |
| TUSC | Karen Seymour | 123 | 0.3 | N/A |
| Independent | Zen Bilas | 85 | 0.2 | N/A |
| Majority | | 3,485 | 8.5 | N/A |
| Turnout | | 41,087 | 55.1 | −8.1 |
| Registered electors | | 73,817 | | |
| Labour gain from Conservative | | Swing | +21.3 | |

=== Elections in the 2010s ===
General election 2019: Mansfield
| Party | Candidate | Votes | % | ±% |
|---|---|---|---|---|
| Conservative | Ben Bradley | 31,484 | 63.9 | +17.3 |
| Labour | Sonya Ward | 15,178 | 30.8 | −13.7 |
| Liberal Democrats | Sarah Brown | 1,626 | 3.3 | +1.9 |
| Independent | Sid Pepper | 527 | 1.1 | −4.2 |
| Independent | Stephen Harvey | 458 | 0.9 | New |
| Majority | | 16,306 | 33.1 | +31.0 |
| Turnout | | 49,273 | 63.9 | −0.6 |
| Conservative hold | | Swing | +15.0 | |

General election 2017: Mansfield
| Party | Candidate | Votes | % | ±% |
|---|---|---|---|---|
| Conservative | Ben Bradley | 23,392 | 46.6 | +18.4 |
| Labour | Alan Meale | 22,335 | 44.5 | +5.1 |
| UKIP | Sid Pepper | 2,654 | 5.3 | −19.8 |
| Independent | Philip Shields | 1,079 | 2.2 | New |
| Liberal Democrats | Anita Prabhakar | 697 | 1.4 | −1.9 |
| Majority | | 1,057 | 2.1 | N/A |
| Turnout | | 50,157 | 64.5 | +3.6 |
| Conservative gain from Labour | | Swing | +6.7 | |

General election 2015: Mansfield
| Party | Candidate | Votes | % | ±% |
|---|---|---|---|---|
| Labour | Alan Meale | 18,603 | 39.4 | +0.7 |
| Conservative | Andrea Clarke | 13,288 | 28.2 | +1.9 |
| UKIP | Sid Pepper | 11,850 | 25.1 | +18.9 |
| Liberal Democrats | Tony Rogers | 1,642 | 3.5 | −11.9 |
| Green | Paul Frost | 1,486 | 3.1 | New |
| TUSC | Karen Seymour | 324 | 0.7 | New |
| Majority | | 5,315 | 11.2 | −1.2 |
| Turnout | | 47,193 | 60.9 | +0.5 |
| Labour hold | | Swing | −0.6 | |

General election 2010: Mansfield
| Party | Candidate | Votes | % | ±% |
|---|---|---|---|---|
| Labour | Alan Meale | 18,753 | 38.7 | −11.4 |
| Conservative | Tracy Critchlow | 12,741 | 26.3 | +7.6 |
| Liberal Democrats | Michael Wyatt | 7,469 | 15.4 | +1.4 |
| Mansfield Independent Forum | Andre Camilleri | 4,339 | 9.0 | −8.0 |
| UKIP | David Hamilton | 2,985 | 6.2 | New |
| BNP | Rachel Hill | 2,108 | 4.4 | New |
| Majority | | 6,012 | 12.4 | −19.0 |
| Turnout | | 48,395 | 60.4 | +3.5 |
| Labour hold | | Swing | −9.5 | |

=== Elections in the 2000s ===
General election 2005: Mansfield
| Party | Candidate | Votes | % | ±% |
|---|---|---|---|---|
| Labour | Alan Meale | 18,400 | 48.1 | −9.0 |
| Conservative | Anne Wright | 7,035 | 18.4 | −8.8 |
| Mansfield Independent Forum | Stewart Rickersey | 6,491 | 17.0 | New |
| Liberal Democrats | Roger Shelley | 5,316 | 13.9 | −1.8 |
| Veritas | Michael Harvey | 1,034 | 2.7 | New |
| Majority | | 11,365 | 29.7 | −0.2 |
| Turnout | | 38,276 | 55.4 | +0.2 |
| Labour hold | | Swing | −0.1 | |

General election 2001: Mansfield
| Party | Candidate | Votes | % | ±% |
|---|---|---|---|---|
| Labour | Alan Meale | 21,050 | 57.1 | −7.3 |
| Conservative | William Wellesley | 10,012 | 27.2 | +6.0 |
| Liberal Democrats | Tim Hill | 5,790 | 15.7 | +4.6 |
| Majority | | 11,038 | 29.9 | −13.4 |
| Turnout | | 36,852 | 55.2 | −15.5 |
| Labour hold | | Swing | | |

=== Elections in the 1990s ===
General election 1997: Mansfield
| Party | Candidate | Votes | % | ±% |
|---|---|---|---|---|
| Labour | Alan Meale | 30,556 | 64.4 | +10.0 |
| Conservative | Tim Frost | 10,038 | 21.2 | −11.9 |
| Liberal Democrats | Phil Smith | 5,244 | 11.1 | −1.5 |
| Referendum | Jim Bogusz | 1,588 | 3.3 | New |
| Majority | | 20,518 | 43.3 | +22.0 |
| Turnout | | 47,426 | 70.7 | −11.5 |
| Labour hold | | Swing | | |

General election 1992: Mansfield
| Party | Candidate | Votes | % | ±% |
|---|---|---|---|---|
| Labour | Alan Meale | 29,932 | 54.4 | +16.9 |
| Conservative | Gary S. Mond | 18,208 | 33.1 | −4.3 |
| Liberal Democrats | Stuart R. Thompstone | 6,925 | 12.6 | −9.6 |
| Majority | | 11,724 | 21.3 | +21.2 |
| Turnout | | 55,065 | 82.2 | +3.8 |
| Labour hold | | Swing | +10.6 | |

=== Elections in the 1980s ===
General election 1987: Mansfield
| Party | Candidate | Votes | % | ±% |
|---|---|---|---|---|
| Labour | Alan Meale | 19,610 | 37.5 | −3.0 |
| Conservative | Charles Hendry | 19,554 | 37.4 | +1.8 |
| SDP | Barry Answer | 11,604 | 22.2 | −1.7 |
| Moderate Labour | Brian Marshall | 1,580 | 3.0 | New |
| Majority | | 56 | 0.1 | −4.8 |
| Turnout | | 52,348 | 78.4 | +7.7 |
| Labour hold | | Swing | −2.4 | |

General election 1983: Mansfield
| Party | Candidate | Votes | % | ±% |
|---|---|---|---|---|
| Labour | Don Concannon | 18,670 | 40.5 | −11.8 |
| Conservative | Richard Wrenn | 16,454 | 35.6 | +3.7 |
| SDP | Stephen Taylor | 11,036 | 23.9 | New |
| Majority | | 2,216 | 4.9 | −15.5 |
| Turnout | | 46,160 | 70.7 | −6.6 |
| Labour hold | | Swing | -7.75 | |

=== Elections in the 1970s ===
General election 1979: Mansfield
| Party | Candidate | Votes | % | ±% |
|---|---|---|---|---|
| Labour | Don Concannon | 29,051 | 52.28 | −5.13 |
| Conservative | K Daly | 17,720 | 31.89 | +8.73 |
| Liberal | David Chambers | 8,536 | 15.36 | −3.19 |
| National Front | P Donovan | 259 | 0.47 | New |
| Majority | | 11,331 | 20.39 | |
| Turnout | | 55,566 | 77.34 | |
| Labour hold | | Swing | -6.93 | |

General election October 1974: Mansfield
| Party | Candidate | Votes | % | ±% |
|---|---|---|---|---|
| Labour | Don Concannon | 28,964 | 57.41 | |
| Conservative | JR Wood | 11,685 | 23.16 | |
| Liberal | David Chambers | 9,358 | 18.55 | |
| Communist | Frederick Charles Westacott | 448 | 0.89 | |
| Majority | | 17,279 | 34.25 | |
| Turnout | | 50,455 | 72.54 | |
| Labour hold | | Swing | | |

General election February 1974: Mansfield
| Party | Candidate | Votes | % | ±% |
|---|---|---|---|---|
| Labour | Don Concannon | 34,378 | 64.51 | |
| Conservative | HJ Thompson | 18,236 | 34.22 | |
| Communist | Frederick Charles Westacott | 675 | 1.27 | |
| Majority | | 16,142 | 30.29 | |
| Turnout | | 53,289 | 77.35 | |
| Labour hold | | Swing | | |

General election 1970: Mansfield
| Party | Candidate | Votes | % | ±% |
|---|---|---|---|---|
| Labour | Don Concannon | 30,554 | 66.12 | |
| Conservative | C William H Morton | 15,027 | 32.52 | |
| Communist | Frederick Charles Westacott | 628 | 1.36 | |
| Majority | | 15,527 | 33.60 | |
| Turnout | | 46,209 | 68.67 | |
| Labour hold | | Swing | | |

=== Elections in the 1960s ===
General election 1966: Mansfield
| Party | Candidate | Votes | % | ±% |
|---|---|---|---|---|
| Labour | Don Concannon | 28,849 | 64.24 | |
| Conservative | Kenneth Clarke | 9,987 | 22.24 | |
| Liberal | Reginald Strauther | 5,483 | 12.21 | |
| Communist | Frederick Charles Westacott | 590 | 1.31 | New |
| Majority | | 18,862 | 42.00 | |
| Turnout | | 44,909 | 74.82 | |
| Labour hold | | Swing | | |

General election 1964: Mansfield
| Party | Candidate | Votes | % | ±% |
|---|---|---|---|---|
| Labour | Bernard Taylor | 29,055 | 63.57 | |
| Conservative | Kenneth Clarke | 10,021 | 21.93 | |
| Liberal | Reginald Strauther | 6,628 | 14.50 | |
| Majority | | 19,034 | 41.64 | |
| Turnout | | 45,704 | 77.86 | |
| Labour hold | | Swing | | |

=== Elections in the 1950s ===
General election 1959: Mansfield
| Party | Candidate | Votes | % | ±% |
|---|---|---|---|---|
| Labour | Bernard Taylor | 31,066 | 67.88 | |
| Conservative | M Robert V Eliot | 14,700 | 32.12 | |
| Majority | | 16,366 | 35.76 | |
| Turnout | | 45,766 | 80.75 | |
| Labour hold | | Swing | | |

General election 1955: Mansfield
| Party | Candidate | Votes | % | ±% |
|---|---|---|---|---|
| Labour | Bernard Taylor | 29,543 | 68.46 | |
| Conservative | Ian Berkeley Church | 13,610 | 31.54 | |
| Majority | | 15,933 | 36.92 | |
| Turnout | | 43,153 | 78.15 | |
| Labour hold | | Swing | | |

General election 1951: Mansfield
| Party | Candidate | Votes | % | ±% |
|---|---|---|---|---|
| Labour | Bernard Taylor | 37,097 | 69.92 | |
| Conservative | Muriel Evelyn Williamson | 15,961 | 30.08 | |
| Majority | | 21,136 | 39.84 | |
| Turnout | | 53,058 | 83.34 | |
| Labour hold | | Swing | | |

General election 1950: Mansfield
| Party | Candidate | Votes | % | ±% |
|---|---|---|---|---|
| Labour | Bernard Taylor | 36,224 | 66.65 | |
| Conservative | Herbert Leslie Milliard | 12,495 | 22.99 | |
| Liberal | C H Preston Robinson | 5,145 | 9.47 | New |
| Communist | W Les Ellis | 482 | 0.89 | New |
| Majority | | 23,729 | 43.66 | |
| Turnout | | 54,346 | 85.83 | |
| Labour hold | | Swing | | |

=== Elections in the 1940s ===
General election 1945: Mansfield
| Party | Candidate | Votes | % | ±% |
|---|---|---|---|---|
| Labour | Bernard Taylor | 43,113 | 75.09 | |
| Conservative | Thomas Lynch | 14,302 | 24.91 | |
| Majority | | 28,811 | 50.18 | |
| Turnout | | 57,415 | 75.93 | |
| Labour hold | | Swing | | |

1941 Mansfield by-election
| Party | Candidate | Votes | % | ±% |
|---|---|---|---|---|
| Labour | Bernard Taylor | Unopposed | N/A | N/A |
| Labour hold | | | | |

=== Elections in the 1930s ===
General election 1935: Mansfield
| Party | Candidate | Votes | % | ±% |
|---|---|---|---|---|
| Labour | Charles Brown | 31,803 | 68.01 | |
| Conservative | Alexander Spearman | 14,962 | 31.99 | |
| Majority | | 16,841 | 36.02 | |
| Turnout | | 46,765 | 69.54 | |
| Labour hold | | Swing | | |

General election 1931: Mansfield
| Party | Candidate | Votes | % | ±% |
|---|---|---|---|---|
| Labour | Charles Brown | 26,865 | 55.77 | |
| Conservative | ESB Hopkin | 21,303 | 44.23 | |
| Majority | | 5,562 | 11.54 | |
| Turnout | | 48,168 | 77.01 | |
| Labour hold | | Swing | | |

=== Elections in the 1920s ===
General election 1929: Mansfield
| Party | Candidate | Votes | % | ±% |
|---|---|---|---|---|
| Labour | Charles Brown | 28,416 | 58.6 | −0.4 |
| Liberal | William Collins | 10,517 | 21.7 | New |
| Unionist | S R Sidebottom | 9,035 | 18.6 | −22.4 |
| Communist | Rosina Smith | 533 | 1.1 | New |
| Majority | | 17,899 | 36.9 | +18.9 |
| Turnout | | 48,501 | 81.2 | +6.4 |
| Registered electors | | 59,735 | | |
| Labour hold | | Swing | +11.0 | |

General election 1924: Mansfield
| Party | Candidate | Votes | % | ±% |
|---|---|---|---|---|
| Labour | Frank Varley | 19,441 | 59.0 | +1.2 |
| Unionist | C.L. Hanington | 13,535 | 41.0 | New |
| Majority | | 5,906 | 18.0 | +2.4 |
| Turnout | | 32,976 | 74.8 | −1.1 |
| Registered electors | | 44,094 | | |
| Labour hold | | Swing | +1.2 | |

General election 1923: Mansfield
| Party | Candidate | Votes | % | ±% |
|---|---|---|---|---|
| Labour | Frank Varley | 18,813 | 57.8 | +9.8 |
| Liberal | Albert Bennett | 13,757 | 42.2 | −9.8 |
| Majority | | 5,056 | 15.6 | N/A |
| Turnout | | 32,570 | 75.9 | +1.6 |
| Registered electors | | 42,937 | | |
| Labour gain from Liberal | | Swing | +9.8 | |

General election 1922: Mansfield
| Party | Candidate | Votes | % | ±% |
|---|---|---|---|---|
| Liberal | Albert Bennett | 16,192 | 52.0 | +32.5 |
| Labour | William Carter | 14,917 | 48.0 | +4.4 |
| Majority | | 1,275 | 4.0 | N/A |
| Turnout | | 31,109 | 74.3 | +21.8 |
| Registered electors | | 41,868 | | |
| Liberal gain from Labour | | Swing | +14.1 | |

=== Elections in the 1910s ===
General election 1918: Mansfield
| Party | | Candidate | Votes | % | ±% |
|---|---|---|---|---|---|
| | Labour | William Carter | 8,957 | 43.6 | New |
| C | National Democratic | George Jarrett | 6,678 | 32.6 | New |
| | Liberal | Violet Markham | 4,000 | 19.5 | −53.5 |
| | Independent | Nowroji Merwangi Tarachand | 878 | 4.3 | New |
| Majority | | | 2,279 | 11.0 | N/A |
| Turnout | | | 20,513 | 52.5 | −21.4 |
| Registered electors | | | 39,041 | | |
| | Labour gain from Liberal | | Swing | N/A | |
C indicates candidate endorsed by the coalition government.

== Election results 1885–1918 ==
=== Elections in the 1880s ===
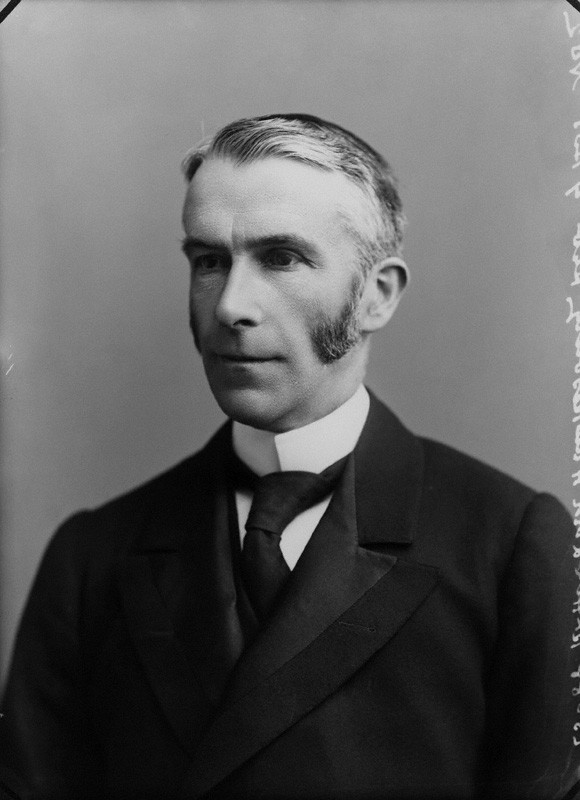
Foljambe

General election 1885: Mansfield
| Party | Candidate | Votes | % | ±% |
|---|---|---|---|---|
| Liberal | Cecil Foljambe | 6,120 | 72.6 | |
| Conservative | John Horne Payne | 2,305 | 27.4 | |
| Majority | | 3,815 | 45.2 | |
| Turnout | | 8,425 | 85.4 | |
| Registered electors | | 9,862 | | |
| Liberal win (new seat) | | | | |

General election 1886: Mansfield
| Party | Candidate | Votes | % | ±% |
|---|---|---|---|---|
| Liberal | Cecil Foljambe | 4,876 | 63.3 | −9.3 |
| Conservative | Lancelot Rolleston | 2,832 | 36.7 | +9.3 |
| Majority | | 2,044 | 26.6 | −18.6 |
| Turnout | | 7,708 | 78.2 | −7.2 |
| Registered electors | | 9,862 | | |
| Liberal hold | | Swing | -9.3 | |

=== Elections in the 1890s ===
General election 1892: Mansfield
| Party | Candidate | Votes | % | ±% |
|---|---|---|---|---|
| Liberal | John Williams | 5,731 | 63.9 | +0.6 |
| Conservative | Daniel Warde | 3,235 | 36.1 | −0.6 |
| Majority | | 2,496 | 27.8 | +1.2 |
| Turnout | | 8,966 | 77.7 | −0.5 |
| Registered electors | | 11,539 | | |
| Liberal hold | | Swing | +0.6 | |

General election 1895: Mansfield
| Party | Candidate | Votes | % | ±% |
|---|---|---|---|---|
| Liberal | John Williams | 5,670 | 57.0 | −6.9 |
| Conservative | Henry Eyre | 4,285 | 43.0 | +6.9 |
| Majority | | 1,385 | 14.0 | −13.8 |
| Turnout | | 9,955 | 80.6 | +2.9 |
| Registered electors | | 12,345 | | |
| Liberal hold | | Swing | -6.9 | |

=== Elections in the 1900s ===
Markham

General election 1900: Mansfield
| Party | Candidate | Votes | % | ±% |
|---|---|---|---|---|
| Liberal | Arthur Markham | 6,496 | 61.2 | +4.2 |
| Conservative | Henry Eyre | 4,127 | 38.8 | −4.2 |
| Majority | | 2,369 | 22.4 | +8.4 |
| Turnout | | 10,623 | 73.5 | −7.1 |
| Registered electors | | 14,456 | | |
| Liberal hold | | Swing | +4.2 | |

General election 1906: Mansfield
| Party | Candidate | Votes | % | ±% |
|---|---|---|---|---|
| Liberal | Arthur Markham | Unopposed | | |
| Liberal hold | | | | |

=== Elections in the 1910s ===
General election January 1910: Mansfield
| Party | Candidate | Votes | % | ±% |
|---|---|---|---|---|
| Liberal | Arthur Markham | 12,622 | 74.2 | N/A |
| Conservative | John George Drummond Campbell | 4,382 | 25.8 | New |
| Majority | | 8,240 | 48.4 | N/A |
| Turnout | | 17,004 | 80.7 | N/A |
| Liberal hold | | Swing | | |

General election December 1910: Mansfield
| Party | Candidate | Votes | % | ±% |
|---|---|---|---|---|
| Liberal | Arthur Markham | 11,383 | 73.0 | −1.2 |
| Conservative | Frederick Pepys Cockerill | 4,200 | 27.0 | +1.2 |
| Majority | | 7,183 | 46.0 | −2.4 |
| Turnout | | 15,583 | 73.9 | −6.8 |
| Liberal hold | | Swing | -1.2 | |

General Election 1914–15:

Another General Election was required to take place before the end of 1915. The political parties had been making preparations for an election to take place and by July 1914, the following candidates had been selected;

- Liberal: Arthur Markham
- Unionist:
- Labour:

1916 Mansfield by-election
| Party | Candidate | Votes | % | ±% |
|---|---|---|---|---|
| Liberal | Charles Seely | 7,597 | 63.0 | −10.0 |
| Independent | Arthur Turnbull | 4,456 | 37.0 | New |
| Majority | | 3,141 | 26.0 | −20.0 |
| Turnout | | 12,053 | 48.7 | −25.2 |
| Liberal hold | | Swing | | |

Arthur Turnbull was supported by Horatio Bottomley

== See also ==
- List of parliamentary constituencies in Nottinghamshire
