= Tony Egginton =

British local politician

- Egginton in 2010 at the official opening ceremony of the old Sherwood Baths, originally part of the Sherwood Colliery development, refurbished and renamed as the Rebecca Adlington Swimming Centre

Mayor of Mansfield
- In office 21 October 2002 – 10 May 2015
- Preceded by: Office created
- Succeeded by: Kate Allsop

Personal details
- Born: 1951 (age 74–75)
- Party: Mansfield Independents

Tony Egginton (born 1951) is an English politician. He was the first directly elected Mayor of Mansfield in Nottinghamshire, England. He was elected to the position on 17 October 2002, beating Labour's Lorna Carter by 588 votes, ending 30 years of Labour control.

Egginton was re-elected in 2007 and again 2011, holding the position until his retirement at the end of his third-term of office in May, 2015. He had previously been a newsagent.

== Election to mayor ==
Egginton was the first elected Executive Mayor in a new position created after a public referendum following a campaign by Mansfield businessman Stewart Rickersey, who in 2001 mounted a challenge to the local administration after Mansfield District Council indicated its preference for a Leader and Cabinet system after a low-profile consultation which Rickersey deemed to be "flawed".

Mansfield District Council had suggested a preference of a leader of the council (chosen from within the majority political party – Labour) and a chief executive officer.

At 2002 referendum the electorate voted 8,973 in favour (with 7,350 against, 21% turnout) of a change to a system of directly elected mayor with executive powers (instead of a leader) and a managing director (instead of a CEO).

Rickersey then mounted a high-profile campaign entitled Independent Mayor4Mansfield, revealing his nominee Tony Egginton's identity following initial confidentiality during the referendum stages.

== Creation of Independent Forum ==
Following Egginton's successful election to mayor, Rickersey then recruited many local election candidates to challenge Labour's traditional domination at the May 2003 local elections, winning control with 25 seats consisting of mostly new and inexperienced councillors.

Ultimately these banded together under the name of Mansfield Independent Forum – registered as a political party with the Electoral Commission in 2005, although with members still remaining notionally independent of one another. Egginton formed his Cabinet mostly of MIF members, including Rickersey as Portfolio Holder for Corporate Issues.

Within a year Rickersey was sacked from his cabinet position by Egginton in a reshuffle. Rickersey blamed the influence of senior council officers over the mayor. Rickersey continued as a ward councillor, later masterminding Egginton's 2007 re-election success when beating Labour's Alan Meale, who was also the town's sitting MP. Rickersey was also re-elected to his Lindhurst ward, resigning four months later in August 2007.

== Ward boundary changes ==
In his 2007 re-election manifesto, Egginton unilaterally decided to reduce the number of ward councillors from 46 to 36 by applying to the Boundary Commission to re-structure ward layout and boundaries.

This major change for the Mansfield electoral area was approved for the 2011 local elections with 36 single-member wards being created from the previous 19 wards (two of which were in the Parliamentary constituency of Bassetlaw until 2010). Re-aligning the wards by considering geographical area and housing density reflected a more-even number of voters per ward.

== Personal background ==
Little is publicly known of Tony Egginton's professional CV. Born in 1951, he attended Mansfield's Sherwood Hall Technical Grammar School from 1962–1967, followed by vocational studies in building construction at West Notts College.

He was employed circa 1970 at Blackwell Rural District Council (offices located in Mansfield). He also worked as an apprentice at Metal Box Limited in Mansfield.

In a 2012 BBC Radio Nottingham interview with presenter John Holmes, Egginton stated he was employed at the old Mansfield Borough Council during the building of the Four Seasons shopping centre (land clearance started circa 1973).

Mansfield Borough became a District Council 1 April 1974, merging with the two nearby smaller Urban District authorities of Mansfield Woodhouse and Warsop.

From the 1980s, Egginton ran a small retail newsagent and corner sweet shop, becoming National President of NFRN (National Federation of Retail Newsagents) for 1998/9, also being a director of NFRN Commercial Ltd 1997 to 2000 and a director of Newsagents Federation Services Ltd 1996 to 2006.

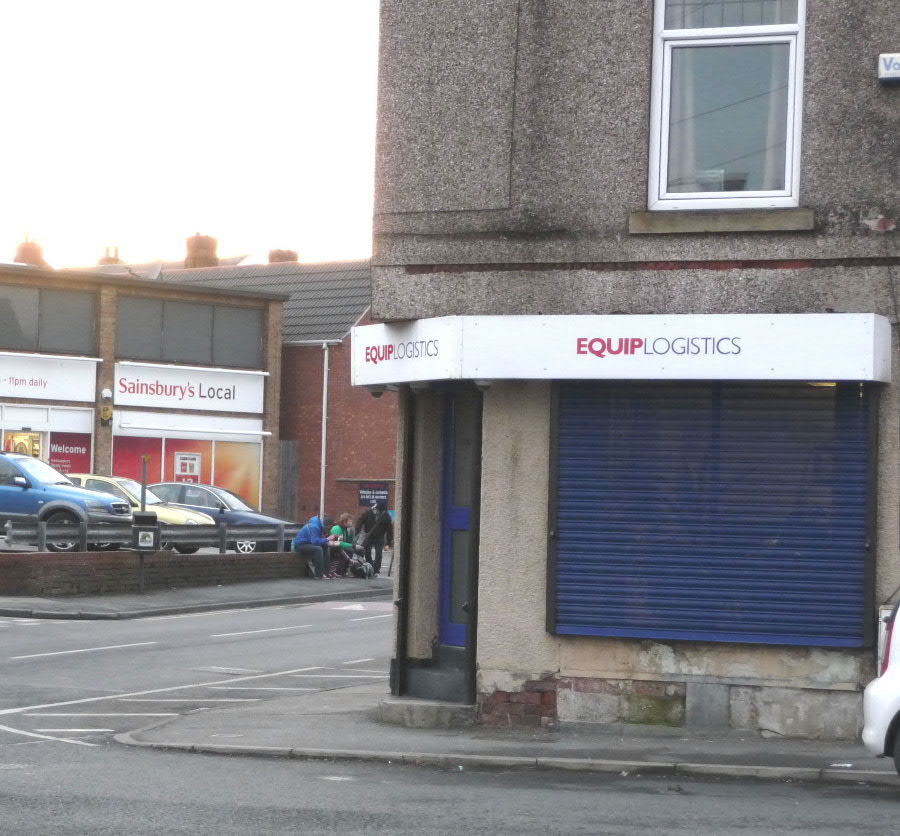
Egginton News former corner-shop premises

In 2002 Jacksons Stores established a new convenience store opposite the newsagents. A planning application submitted by Egginton for change of use (newsagents shop to offices) was approved in January 2004.

The two businesses co-existed until the 2004 takeover of Jacksons by Sainsbury's (rebranded as Sainsbury's at Jacksons). Sainsbury's stock lines included newspapers and magazines, and Egginton News closed, transferring some staff to Jacksons and the delivery service account to another newsagency over a mile away.

The former shop premises were thereafter used by a company providing waste management solutions and internet sales of industrial tools, equipment and protective clothing.

On 31 March 2008 Egginton briefly became the non-executive chairman of Mansfield Town F.C. following James Derry's departure.

== Criticism ==
In 2012, The Mansfield Labour group criticised Egginton after awarding himself a 'martini pass' – a special parking pass which allowed him to park anywhere in the district free-of-charge.

In 2013, Egginton attracted criticism after the council took the decision to lock his chains of office in a safe. He was accused of "parading around in his bling" rather than focusing on running the town. After the 2015 elections when Egginton stood-down, a decision was taken to once-again allow the incumbent-mayor to wear the chains.

In September 2013, a Freedom of Information request revealed that Mansfield District Council pays £4,000 a year to Mayor Egginton's Private Company - Mansfield 2020.

== Finale ==
On 8 November 2013, local radio station Mansfield 103.2 FM mentioned that Egginton would be standing-down at the next elections (2015). During news bulletins, sound-bite comments from Egginton related to the impending completion of a difficult, stalled Mansfield town-centre factory re-development site, with Egginton stating that – during his retirement – he would be pleased to walk around the completed project thinking that he had been part of the development sequence.

When speaking to a reporter from the Mansfield local newspaper later during November 2013 regarding redeveloping the old bus station site, Egginton stated:

I'm fairly confident it will happen – it's one of my legacy aims. When I retire in 18 months' time, I would like to think the issue is resolved and plans are in place.

On the morning of Monday 2 December 2013, local radio station Mansfield 103.2 on their regular hourly news bulletins again carried (different) sound-bites from Egginton, reaffirming his intention to retire in 2015, and adding that even though no candidates had been considered to stand for his Independent Forum party, individuals were coming forward and he expected to play a part in the future selection process.

Throughout the morning of Saturday 4 January 2014, local radio news bulletins again carried regular sound-bites relating to the mayor's last full year in office. Egginton confirmed his priorities were to facilitate the sale of the Four Seasons shopping centre and address the ailing market place retail area, adding that his message for 2014 was to achieve "collaborative working" from all involved.

Egginton held the mayoral position until the local elections of 7 May 2015, when one of his fellow 'Mansfield Independent Forum' party members, Kate Allsop, was elected, winning from Labour's Martin Lee after the second-choice votes were counted, as neither candidate had polled 50%+1 of the total required for an outright win.
