= Music history =

Academic field

Music history, sometimes called historical musicology, is a highly diverse subfield of the broader discipline of musicology that studies music from a historical point of view. In theory, "music history" could refer to the study of the history of any type or genre of music (e.g., the history of Nigerian music or the history of rock); in practice, these research topics are often categorized as part of ethnomusicology or cultural studies, whether or not they are ethnographically based. The terms "music history" and "historical musicology" usually refer to the history of the notated music of Western elites, sometimes called "art music" (by analogy to art history, which tends to focus on elite art).

The methods of music history include source studies (esp. manuscript studies), paleography, philology (especially textual criticism), style criticism, historiography (the choice of historical method), musical analysis, and iconography. The application of musical analysis to further these goals is often a part of music history, though pure analysis or the development of new tools of music analysis is more likely to be seen in the field of music theory. Some of the intellectual products of music historians include peer-reviewed articles in journals, university press-published music history books, university textbooks, new editions of musical works, biographies of composers and other musicians, studies of the relationship between words and music, and reflections upon the role of music in society.

== Pedagogy ==
Although most performers of classical and traditional instruments receive some instruction in music history, whether this is the history of art music, pop, or rock and roll, etc. These from their music teachers throughout their lessons and high school classes, the majority of formal music history courses are offered at the post-secondary (college or university) level. In Canada, some music students receive training prior to undergraduate studies because examinations in music history (as well as music theory) are required to complete Royal Conservatory of Music certification at the Grade 9 level and higher.

Most medium and large institutions will offer music appreciation courses for non-music majors and music history courses for music majors. The two types of courses will usually differ in length (one to two semesters vs. two to four), breadth (many music appreciation courses begin at the late Baroque or classical eras and might omit music after WWII while courses for music majors traditionally span the period from the Middle Ages to the current era), and depth. Both types of courses broach on a narrower subject while introducing more of the tools of research in music history. The range of possible topics is virtually limitless. Some examples might be "Music during World War I," "Medieval and Renaissance instrumental music," "Music and politics," "Mozart's Don Giovanni, or Women and music."

The methods and tools of music history are nearly as many as its subjects and therefore make a strict categorization impossible. However, a few trends and approaches can be outlined here. Like in any other historical discipline, most research in music history can be roughly divided into two categories: the establishing of factual and correct data and the interpretation of data. Most historical research does not fall into one category solely, but rather employs a combination of methods from both categories. The act of establishing factual data can never be fully separate from the act of interpretation.

Archival work may be conducted to find connections to music or musicians in a collection of documents of broader interests (e.g., Vatican pay records, letters to a patroness of the arts) or to more systematically study a collection of documents related to a musician. In some cases, where records, scores, and letters have been digitized, archival work can be done online. One example of a composer for whom archival materials can be examined online is the Arnold Schoenberg Center.

Performance practice draws on many of the tools of historical musicology to answer the specific question of how music was performed in various places at various times in the past. Scholars investigate questions such as which instruments or voices were used to perform a given work, what tempos (or tempo changes) were used, and how (or if) ornaments were used. Although performance practice was previously confined to early music from the Baroque era, since the 1990s, research in performance practice has examined other historical eras, such as how early Classical era piano concerti were performed, how the early history of recording affected the use of vibrato in classical music, or which instruments were used in Klezmer music.

Biographical studies of composers can give us a better sense of the chronology of compositions, influences on style and works, and provide important background to the interpretation (by performers or listeners) of works. Thus biography can form one part of the larger study of the cultural significance, underlying program, or agenda of a work; a study which gained increasing importance in the 1980s and early 1990s.

Sociological studies focus on the function of music in society as well as its meaning for individuals and society as a whole. Researchers emphasizing the social importance of music (including classical music) are sometimes called New musicologists. They may examine the intersection of music and music-making with issues such as race, class, gender, sexuality (e.g. LGBTQ), and disability, among other approaches.

Semiotic studies are most conventionally the province of music analysts rather than historians. However, crucial to the practice of musical semiotics – the interpretation of meaning in a work or style – is its situation in a historical context. The interpretative work of scholars such as Kofi Agawu and Lawrence Kramer falls between the analytic and the music historical.

== History ==
=== Before 1898 ===
The first studies of Western musical history date back to the middle of the 18th century. G.B. Martini published a three volume history titled Storia della musica (History of Music) between 1757 and 1781. Martin Gerbert published a two volume history of sacred music titled De cantu de musica sacra in 1774. Gerbert followed this work with a three volume work Scriptores ecclesiastici de musica sacra containing significant writings on sacred music from the 3rd century onwards in 1784.

=== 1800–1950 ===
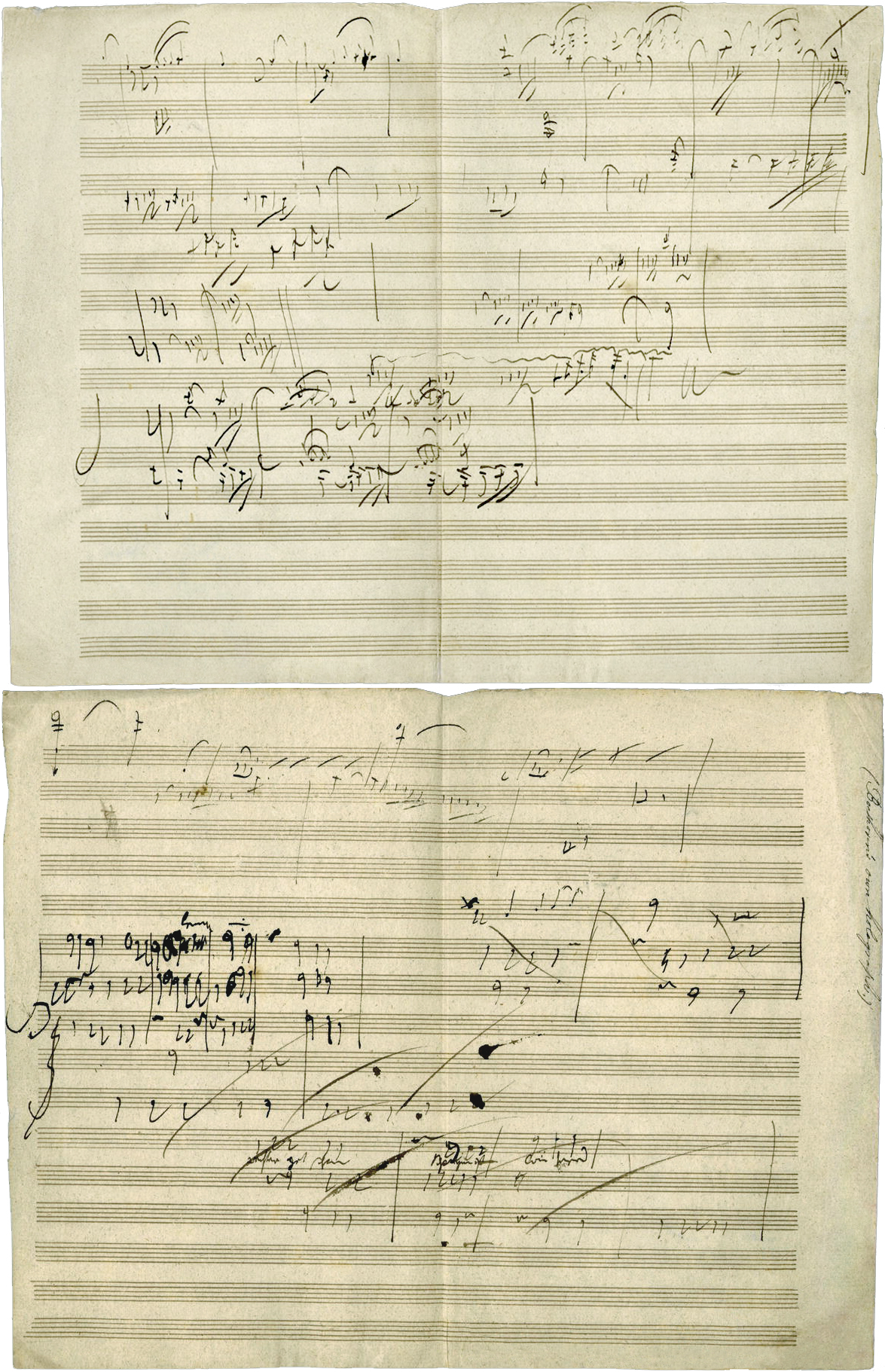
Ludwig van Beethoven's manuscript sketch for Piano Sonata No. 28, Movement IV, Geschwind, doch nicht zu sehr und mit Entschlossenheit (Allegro), in his own handwriting. The piece was completed in 1816.

In the 20th century, the work of Johannes Wolf and others developed studies in Medieval music and early Renaissance music. Wolf's writings on the history of musical notation are considered to be particularly notable by musicologists. Historical musicology has played a critical role in renewed interest in Baroque music as well as medieval and Renaissance music. In particular, the authentic performance movement owes much to historical musicological scholarship. Towards the middle of the 20th century, musicology (and its largest subfield of historical musicology) expanded significantly as a field of study. Concurrently the number of musicological and music journals increased to create further outlets for the publication of research. The domination of German language scholarship ebbed as significant journals sprang up throughout the West, especially America.

== Critiques ==
=== Exclusion of disciplines and musics ===
In its most narrow definition, historical musicology is the music history of Western culture. Such a definition arbitrarily excludes disciplines other than history, cultures other than Western, and forms of music other than "classical" ("art", "serious", "high culture") or notated ("artificial") – implying that the omitted disciplines, cultures, and musical styles/genres are somehow inferior. A somewhat broader definition incorporating all musical humanities is still problematic, because it arbitrarily excludes the relevant (natural) sciences (acoustics, psychology, physiology, neurosciences, information and computer sciences, empirical sociology and aesthetics) as well as musical practice. The musicological sub-disciplines of music theory and music analysis have likewise historically been rather uneasily separated from the most narrow definition of historical musicology.

Within historical musicology, scholars have been reluctant to adopt postmodern and critical approaches that are common elsewhere in the humanities. According to Susan McClary (2000, p. 1285) the discipline of "music lags behind the other arts; it picks up ideas from other media just when they have become outmoded." Only in the 1990s did historical musicologists, preceded by feminist musicologists in the late 1980s, begin to address issues such as gender, sexualities, bodies, emotions, and subjectivities which dominated the humanities for twenty years before (ibid, p. 10). In McClary's words (1991, p. 5), "It almost seems that musicology managed miraculously to pass directly from pre- to postfeminism without ever having to change – or even examine – its ways." Furthermore, in their discussion on musicology and rock music, Susan McClary and Robert Walser also address a key struggle within the discipline: how musicology has often "dismisse[d] questions of socio-musical interaction out of hand, that part of classical music's greatness is ascribed to its autonomy from society." (1988, p. 283)

=== Exclusion of popular music ===
According to Richard Middleton, the strongest criticism of (historical) musicology has been that it generally ignores popular music. Though musicological study of popular music has vastly increased in quantity recently, Middleton's assertion in 1990—that most major "works of musicology, theoretical or historical, act as though popular music did not exist"—holds true. Academic and conservatory training typically only peripherally addresses this broad spectrum of musics, and many (historical) musicologists who are "both contemptuous and condescending are looking for types of production, musical form, and listening which they associate with a different kind of music...'classical music'...and they generally find popular music lacking"

He cites three main aspects of this problem (p. 104–6). The terminology of historical musicology is "slanted by the needs and history of a particular music ('classical music')." He acknowledges that "there is a rich vocabulary for certain areas [harmony, tonality, certain part-writing and forms], important in musicology's typical corpus"; yet he points out that there is "an impoverished vocabulary for other areas [rhythm, pitch nuance and gradation, and timbre], which are less well developed" in Classical music. Middleton argues that a number of "terms are ideologically loaded" in that "they always involve selective, and often unconsciously formulated, conceptions of what music is."

As well, he claims that historical musicology uses "a methodology slanted by the characteristics of notation," 'notational centricity' (Tagg 1979, p. 28–32). As a result, "musicological methods tend to foreground those musical parameters which can be easily notated" such as pitch relationships or the relationship between words and music. On the other hand, historical musicology tends to "neglect or have difficulty with parameters which are not easily notated", such as tone colour or non-Western rhythms. In addition, he claims that the "notation-centric training" of Western music schools "induces particular forms of listening, and these then tend to be applied to all sorts of music, appropriately or not". As a result, Western music students trained in historical musicology may listen to a funk or Latin song that is very rhythmically complex, but then dismiss it as a low-level musical work because it has a very simple melody and only uses two or five chords.

Notational centricity also encourages "reification: the score comes to be seen as 'the music', or perhaps the music in an ideal form." As such, music that does not use a written score, such as jazz, blues, or folk, can become demoted to a lower level of status. As well, historical musicology has "an ideology slanted by the origins and development of a particular body of music and its aesthetic...It arose at a specific moment, in a specific context – nineteenth-century Europe, especially Germany – and in close association with that movement in the musical practice of the period which was codifying the very repertory then taken by musicology as the centre of its attention." These terminological, methodological, and ideological problems affect even works sympathetic to popular music. However, it is not "that musicology cannot understand popular music, or that students of popular music should abandon musicology." (Middleton, p. 104).

== See also ==
- History of music
- Music-specific disorders
- Music
- Music archaeology
- Lists of musicians
- Glossary of music terminology

== Notes ==
- Lipman, Samuel, The House of Music: Art in an Era of Institutions, published by D.R. Godine, 1984. ISBN 0-87923-501-2
