= Robert Walser (musicologist) =

American musicologist

Robert Walser is an American musicologist associated with the "new musicology". He is author of the book Running With the Devil: Power, Gender, and Madness in Heavy Metal Music, concerning heavy metal music. Walser currently is a member of the faculty at Case Western Reserve University.

Walser has also served as an expert witness for over 250 music copyright infringement cases, generally reserved to the Ninth Circuit. His big success came from a broad statement of support from Circuit Judge William C. Canby, Jr., who fully supported Dr. Walser's methodology, despite the less-than-appropriate credibility that Dr. Walser received via District Judge Christina A. Snyder {see Swirsky v. Carey, 226 F. Supp. 2d 1224 (C.D. Cal. 2002).

Walser is married to musicologist Susan McClary.

== Publications ==
- Running With the Devil: Power, Gender, and Madness in Heavy Metal Music (Wesleyan University Press, 1993, ISBN 0-8195-6260-2). Second edition, revised and expanded, 2014.
- (ed.) Keeping Time. Readings in Jazz History (OUP, 1999) ^{2}. Second edition, revised and expanded, 2014.
- (ed.) The Christopher Small Reader (Wesleyan University Press, 2016).
- Valuing Jazz, in The Cambridge Companion to Jazz, ed. David Horn and Mervyn Cooke (Cambridge: Cambridge University Press, 2002), pp. 301–320.
- Analyzing Popular Music: Ten Apothegms and Four Instances, in Allan Moore, ed., The Analysis of Popular Music (Cambridge: Cambridge University Press, 2003), pp. 16–38.
- Deep Jazz: Notes on Interiority, Race, and Criticism, in Inventing the Psychological: Toward a Cultural History of Emotional Life in America, ed. Joel Pfister and Nancy Schnog (Yale University Press, 1997), pp. 271–96.
- Out of Notes: Signification, Interpretation, and the Problem of Miles Davis, Musical Quarterly 77:2 (Summer 1993), pp. 343–65.
- Rhythm, Rhyme, and Rhetoric in the Music of Public Enemy, Ethnomusicology 39:2 (Spring-Summer 1995), 193–217.
- Prince as Queer Poststructuralist, Popular Music and Society 18:2 (Summer 1994), 87–98.
