= Susan McClary =

American musicologist (born 1946)

- Born: October 2, 1946 (age 80); St. Louis, Missouri, U.S.
- Education: Southern Illinois University (BA); Harvard University (MA, PhD)
- Occupation: Musicologist
- Spouse: Robert Walser
- Writing career
- Subjects: Music, feminism
- Notable works: Feminine Endings: Music, Gender, & Sexuality

Susan Kaye McClary (born October 2, 1946) is an American musicologist and music theorist associated with "new musicology". Noted for her work combining musicology with feminist music criticism, McClary is professor of musicology at Case Western Reserve University.

== Early life and education ==
McClary was born in St. Louis, Missouri, and received her BA in 1968 from Southern Illinois University. She attended graduate school at Harvard University where she received her MA in 1971 and her PhD in 1976. Her doctoral dissertation was on the transition from modal to tonal organization in Monteverdi's works. The first half of her dissertation was later reworked and expanded in her 2004 book, Modal Subjectivities: Self-fashioning in the Italian Madrigal.

== Career ==
Susan McClary (PhD, Harvard) is Fynette H. Kulas Professor of Music at Case Western Reserve University and Distinguished Professor Emerita, UCLA (1994-2011); she has also taught at the University of Minnesota (1977-1991), McGill University (1991-1994), UC Berkeley, and University of Oslo (2007-2012). Her research focuses on the cultural analysis of music, both the European canon and contemporary popular genres. Best known for her book Feminine Endings: Music, Gender, and Sexuality, she is also author of Georges Bizet: Carmen; Conventional Wisdom: The Content of Musical Form; Modal Subjectivities: Renaissance Self-Fashioning in the Italian Madrigal; Reading Music: Selected Essays by Susan McClary; Desire and Pleasure in Seventeenth-Century Music; Structures of Feeling in Seventeenth-Century Expressive Culture; T he Passions of Peter Sellars: Staging the Music; and Making Sense of Music. Her work has been translated into at least twenty languages, and she has advised more than fifty doctoral dissertations. McClary received a MacArthur Foundation “Genius” Fellowship in 1995 and has been awarded honorary doctorates from McGill University, Southern Illinois University, and Cleveland Institute of Music.

One of her best known works is Feminine Endings (1991). "Feminine ending" is a term used in music theory and in Metre (poetry) to denote a weak phrase ending or cadence. The work covers musical constructions of gender and sexuality, gendered aspects of traditional music theory, gendered sexuality in musical narrative, music as a gendered discourse, and discursive strategies of women musicians.

McClary suggests that sonata form may be interpreted as sexist or misogynistic and imperialistic, and that, "tonality itself – with its process of instilling expectations and subsequently withholding promised fulfillment until climax – is the principal musical means during the period from 1600 to 1900 for arousing and channeling desire." She interprets the sonata procedure for its constructions of gender and sexual identity. The primary, "masculine" key (or first subject group) represents the male self, while the secondary, "feminine" key (or second subject group), represents the other, a territory to be explored and conquered, assimilated into the self and stated in the tonic home key.

McClary set the feminist arguments of her early book in a broader sociopolitical context with Conventional Wisdom (2000). In it, she argues that the traditional musicological assumption of the existence of "purely musical" elements, divorced from culture and meaning, the social and the body, is a conceit used to veil the social and political imperatives of the worldview that produces the classical canon most prized by musicologists. She examines the creation of meanings and identities, some oppressive and hegemonic, some affirmative and resistant, in music through the referencing of musical conventions in the blues, Vivaldi, Prince, Philip Glass, and others.

While seen by some as extremely radical, her work is influenced by musicologists such as Edward T. Cone, gender theorists and cultural critics such as Teresa de Lauretis, and others who, like McClary, fall in between, such as Theodor Adorno. McClary herself admits that her analyses, though intended to deconstruct, engage in essentialism.

== "Constructions of Subjectivity in Franz Schubert's Music" ==
"Constructions of Subjectivity in Franz Schubert's Music" first appeared as a paper delivered at the American Musicological Society in 1990 and then in a revised version as a symposium presentation during the 1992 Schubertiade Festival in New York City. At the time McClary was influenced by Maynard Solomon's claim in his 1989 paper "Franz Schubert and the Peacocks of Benvenuto Cellini" that Schubert was homosexual. McClary's paper explored the relevance of Solomon's research to what she termed the uninhibited, "hedonistic" luxuriance of Schubert's "Unfinished" Symphony. The symposium paper elicited some mild controversy. Following evidence that Solomon's conclusions may have been flawed and largely based on his own psychoanalytic reading of a dream narrative Schubert set down in 1822, McClary revised the paper again. Its definitive version was printed in the 1994 edition of the book Queering the Pitch: The New Gay and Lesbian Musicology edited by Philip Brett, Elizabeth Wood, and Gary Thomas.

According to McClary, Schubert, in the second movement of his Unfinished Symphony, foregoes the usual narrative of the sonata form by "wandering" from one key area to another in a manner which does not consolidate the tonic, but without causing its violent reaffirmation:

What is remarkable about this movement is that Schubert conceives of and executes a musical narrative that does not enact the more standard model in which a self strives to define identity through the consolidation of ego boundaries...in a Beethovian world such a passage would sound vulnerable, its tonal identity not safely anchored; and its ambiguity would probably precipitate a crisis, thereby justifying the violence needed to put things right again.

While maintaining that attempting to read Schubert's sexuality from his music would be essentialism, she proposes that it may be possible to notice intentional ways in which Schubert composed in order to express his "difference" as a part of himself at a time when "the self" was becoming prominent in the arts. Schubert's music and often the man himself and the subjectivity he presented have been criticized as effeminate, especially in comparison to Beethoven, the model and aggressive master of the sonata form (Sir George Grove, after Schumann: "compared with Beethoven, Schubert is as a woman to a man"; Carl Dahlhaus: "weak" and "involuntary"). However, McClary notes: "what is at issue is not Schubert's deviance from a "straight" norm, but rather his particular constructions of subjectivity, especially as they contrast with many of those posed by his peers."

Some of the ideas about composition as subjective narrative proposed in "Constructions" were developed by McClary in her 1997 article, "The Impromptu that trod on a loaf", which applies this analysis to Schubert's Impromptu Op. 90, Number 2. "Constructions of Subjectivity in Franz Schubert's Music" and the ideas in it continue to be discussed, sometimes critically. However, the article influenced a number of queer theorists, and in 2003 was described by the musicologist, Lawrence Kramer, as still an important paper in the field. The paper, and the reactions to it are also discussed in Mark Lindsey Mitchell's Virtuosi: A Defense and a (sometimes Erotic) Celebration of Great Pianists.

== Criticism ==
=== The remark on Beethoven's Ninth ===
In the January 1987 issue of Minnesota Composers Forum Newsletter, McClary wrote of Ludwig van Beethoven's Ninth Symphony:

The point of recapitulation in the first movement of the Ninth is one of the most horrifying moments in music, as the carefully prepared cadence is frustrated, damming up energy which finally explodes in the throttling murderous rage of a rapist incapable of attaining release.

This passage has attracted a great deal of attention from other scholars. Several commentators objected to McClary's characterization, including Robert Anton Wilson, Elaine Barkin, and Henry Kingsbury. The pianist and critic Charles Rosen also commented on the famous passage. He avoids taking offense on any of the grounds mentioned above, and is willing to admit sexual metaphors to musical analysis. Rosen's disagreement is simply with McClary's assessment of the music:

We have first her characterization of the moment of recapitulation in the first movement of Beethoven's Ninth Symphony:

The phrase about the murderous rage of the rapist has since been withdrawn [see below], which indicates that McClary realized it posed a problem, but it has the great merit of recognizing that something extraordinary is taking place here, and McClary's metaphor of sexual violence is not a bad way to describe it. The difficulty is that all metaphors oversimplify, like those entertaining little stories that music critics in the nineteenth century used to invent about works of music for an audience whose musical literacy was not too well developed. I do not, myself, find the cadence frustrated or dammed up in any constricting sense, but only given a slightly deviant movement which briefly postpones total fulfillment.

To continue the sexual imagery, I cannot think that the rapist incapable of attaining release is an adequate analogue, but I hear the passage as if Beethoven had found a way of making an orgasm last for sixteen bars. What causes the passage to be so shocking, indeed, is the power of sustaining over such a long phrase what we expect as a brief explosion. To McClary's credit, it should be said that some kind of metaphorical description is called for, and even necessary, but I should like to suggest that none will be satisfactory or definitive.

McClary has responded to the controversy in various ways. As Rosen noted, she subsequently rephrased this passage in Feminine Endings:

'[...] [T]he point of recapitulation in the first movement of Beethoven's Ninth Symphony unleashes one of the most horrifyingly violent episodes in the history of music. The problem Beethoven has constructed for this movement is that it seems to begin before the subject of the symphony has managed to achieve its identity. (128)

She goes on to conclude that "The Ninth Symphony is probably our most compelling articulation in music of the contradictory impulses that have organized patriarchal culture since the Enlightenment" (129). The critiques of McClary discussed below refer primarily to the original version of the passage.

McClary has also noted that she "can say something nice about Beethoven", saying of his String Quartet, Op. 132, "Few pieces offer so vivid an image of shattered subjectivity as the opening of Op. 132."

Writing over thirty years after the original 1987 publication, McClary observed:

People often ask me if I regret having written this essay. I have lived with the consequences for over thirty years, and no matter how much I publish on modal theory or Kaija Saariaho, I will always be identified with this sentence, nearly always taken out of context. I hasten to mention that I have taught a course on Beethoven quartets every other year since 1980; unless a student has googled me and asked about the controversy, no one in my classes would have any inkling of my presumed hatred of this composer. But no, je ne regrette rien. I still stand by my argument and even my imagery after all these years.

=== Other commentary ===
Music theorist Pieter van den Toorn has complained that McClary's polemics negate the asocial autonomy of absolute music; he is concerned with formal analysis in the tradition of Schenker. Van den Toorn complains, for example, that "Fanned by an aversion for male sexuality, which it depicts as something brutal and contemptible, irrelevancies are being read into the music." Van den Toorn's complaint was rebutted by musicologist Ruth Solie. Van den Toorn responded with a book on these issues. Musicologist Paula Higgins, in another critique of McClary's work, has observed that "one wonders ... if [McClary] has not strategically co-opted feminism as an excuse for guerrilla attacks on the field." Higgins complains of McClary's "truculent verbal assaults on musicological straw men", and observes that "For all the hip culture critique imported from other fields, McClary has left the cobwebs of patriarchal musicological thought largely intact." Higgins is also critical of McClary's citation practice as it concerns other scholars in the area of feminist musical criticism.

== Personal life ==
McClary is married to musicologist Robert Walser.

== Selected bibliography ==
- McClary, Susan (1987). "The Blasphemy of Talking Politics during Bach Year". In Leppert, Richard; McClary, Susan (eds.). Music and Society: The Politics of Composition, Performance and Reception. Cambridge, Massachusetts: Cambridge University Press. pp. 13–62. ISBN 0521327806.
- — (1989), "Terminal Prestige: The Case of Avant-Garde Music Composition", Cultural Critique, 12 (12): 57–81, doi:10.2307/1354322, JSTOR 1354322
- — (1992). Georges Bizet: Carmen. Cambridge, Massachusetts: Cambridge University Press. ISBN 9780521398978.
- — (2002). Feminine Endings: Music, Gender, & Sexuality (2nd ed.). Minneapolis: University of Minnesota Press. ISBN 9780816641895.
- — (2006), "Constructions of Subjectivity in Franz Schubert's Music", in Brett, Philip; Wood, Elizabeth; Thomas, Gary (eds.), Queering the Pitch: The New Gay and Lesbian Musicology, New York: Routledge, ISBN 0-415-97884-X
- — (2000), Conventional Wisdom: The Content of Musical Form, Ernest Bloch Lectures, Berkeley, California: University of California, ISBN 0-520-23208-9
- — (2004), Modal Subjectivities: Self-Fashioning in the Italian Madrigal, Berkeley and Los Angeles, California: University of California, ISBN 9780520234932
- — (2012), Desire and Pleasure in Seventeenth-Century Music, Berkeley and Los Angeles, California: University of California, ISBN 9780520247345

Articles

McClary, Susan (1976). "The Transition from Modal to Tonal Organization in the Works of Monteverdi". Harvard University.

McClary, Susan (1983). "Pitches, Expression, Ideology: An Exercise in Mediation". Enclitic. 7: 76–86.

McClary, Susan (1985). "Afterword: The Politics of Silence and Sound". In Attali, J. Noise: The Political Economy of Music. University of Minnesota Press. pp. 149–158.

McClary, Susan (1986). "A Musical Dialectic from the Enlightenment: Mozart's Piano Concerto in G Major, K. 453, Movement 2". Cultural Critique. pp. 129–169.

McClary, Susan (1987). "The Blasphemy of Talking Politics during Bach Year". In Leppert, Richard; McClary, Susan (eds.). Music and Society: The Politics of Composition, Performance and Reception. Cambridge University Press. pp. 13–62.

McClary, Susan (1988). "The Undoing of Opera: Toward a Feminist Criticism of Music". In Clément, Catherine. Opera, or the Undoing of Women. pp. ix–xviii.

McClary, Susan (1989). "Terminal Prestige: The Case of Avant-Garde Music Composition". Cultural Critique. 12: 57–81.

McClary, Susan (1989). "This Is Not a Story My People Tell: Musical Time and Space According to Laurie Anderson". Discourse. 12(1): 104–128.

McClary, Susan (1989). "Constructions of Gender in Monteverdi's Dramatic Music". Cambridge Opera Journal. 1(3): 203–223.

McClary, Susan (1989). "Foreword: The Undoing of Opera: Toward a Feminist Criticism of Music". In Clément, Catherine. Opera, or the Undoing of Women.

McClary, Susan (1990). "Living to Tell: Madonna's Resurrection of the Fleshly". Genders. 7: 1–21.

McClary, Susan (1990). "Towards a Feminist Criticism of Music". Canadian University Music Review. 10(2): 9–18.

McClary, Susan; Walser, Robert (1990). "Start Making Sense! Musicology Wrestles with Rock". In Frith, Simon; Goodwin, Andrew (eds.). On Record: Rock, Pop, and the Written Word. pp. 277–292.

McClary, Susan (1991). "Studying Popular Music". Popular Music. 10(2): 237–242.

McClary, Susan (1992). "Structures of Identity and Difference in Carmen". Women: A Cultural Review. 3(1): 1–15.

McClary, Susan (1992). "A Response to Elaine Barkin". Perspectives of New Music. pp. 234–238.

McClary, Susan (1992). "Così? Sexual Politics in Mozart's Operas". Music & Letters. 73(4): 591–593.

McClary, Susan (1992). "The Musical Languages of Carmen". Cambridge University Press.

McClary, Susan (1993). "Narrative Agendas in 'Absolute' Music: Identity and Difference in Brahms's Third Symphony". In Solie, Ruth A. (ed.). Musicology and Difference: Gender and Sexuality in Music Scholarship. University of California Press. pp. 326–344.

McClary, Susan (1993). "Reshaping a Discipline: Musicology and Feminism in the 1990s". Feminist Studies. 19(2): 399–423.

McClary, Susan (1993). "Music and Sexuality: On the Steblin/Solomon Debate". 19th-Century Music. pp. 83–88.

McClary, Susan (1994). "Constructions of Subjectivity in Schubert's Music". In Brett, Philip; Wood, Elizabeth; Thomas, Gary C. (eds.). Queering the Pitch: The New Gay and Lesbian Musicology. Routledge. pp. 205–233.

McClary, Susan (1994). "Same as It Ever Was: Youth Culture and Music". In Ross, Andrew; Rose, Tricia (eds.). Microphone Fiends: Youth Music and Youth Culture. Routledge. pp. 29–40.

McClary, Susan; Walser, Robert (1994). "Theorizing the Body in African-American Music". Black Music Research Journal. pp. 75–84.

McClary, Susan (1994). "Paradigm Dissonances: Music Theory, Cultural Studies, Feminist Criticism". Perspectives of New Music. pp. 68–85.

McClary, Susan (1994). "Of Patriarchs... and Matriarchs, Too. Susan McClary Assesses the Challenges and Contributions of Feminist Musicology". The Musical Times. pp. 364–369.

McClary, Susan; Phelan, James; Rabinowitz, Peter J. (1994). "Narratives of Bourgeois Subjectivity in Mozart’s ‘Prague’ Symphony". In Phelan, James (ed.). Understanding Narrative. pp. 65–98.

McClary, Susan (1994). "Response to Linda Dusman". Perspectives of New Music. pp. 148–153.

McClary, Susan (1994). "Foreword: Ode to Cecilia". In Cook, Susan C.; Tsou, Judy S. (eds.). Cecilia Reclaimed: Feminist Perspectives on Gender and Music. University of Illinois Press.

McClary, Susan (1994). "Monteverdi's Tonal Language". Music Theory Spectrum. 16(2): 261–266.

McClary, Susan (1995). "Music, the Pythagoreans, and the Body". In Foster, Susan Leigh (ed.). Choreographing History. Indiana University Press. pp. 82–104.

McClary, Susan (1997). "Structures of Identity and Difference in Bizet's Carmen". In Dellamora, Richard; Fischlin, Daniel (eds.). The Work of Opera: Genre, Nationhood, and Sexual Difference. Columbia University Press. pp. 115–129.

McClary, Susan (1997). "The Impromptu That Trod on a Loaf: Or How Music Tells Stories". Narrative. 5(1): 20–35.

McClary, Susan (1997). "La misma historia de siempre". A Contratiempo: revista de música en la cultura. pp. 12–23.

McClary, Susan (1997). "Opera: Desire, Disease, Death". Journal of the American Musicological Society. 50(1): 175–181.

McClary, Susan (1998). "Rap, Minimalism, and Structures of Time in Late Twentieth-Century Culture".

McClary, Susan (1998). "Unruly Passions and Courtly Dances: Technologies of the Body in Baroque Music". In Foster, Susan Leigh (ed.). From the Royal to the Republican Body: Incorporating the Political in Seventeenth- and Eighteenth-Century France. University of California Press.

McClary, Susan (1999). "Different Drummers: Theorising Music by Women Composers". In Pendle, Karin (ed.). Musics and Feminisms. Australian Music Centre. pp. 79–86.

McClary, Susan (1999). "Foreword". In Clément, Catherine. Opera, or the Undoing of Women. University of Minnesota Press.

McClary, Susan (2000). "Temporality and Ideology: Qualities of Motion in Seventeenth-Century French Music". Echo: A Music-Centered Journal. 2(2).

McClary, Susan (2000). "Women and Music on the Verge of the New Millennium". Signs: Journal of Women in Culture and Society. 25(4): 1283–1286.

McClary, Susan (2000). "Thinking Blues". In McClary, Susan. Conventional Wisdom: The Content of Musical Form. University of California Press. pp. 32–62.

McClary, Susan (2000). "Reveling in the Rubble: The Postmodern Condition". In McClary, Susan. Conventional Wisdom: The Content of Musical Form. University of California Press. pp. 139–170.

McClary, Susan (2000). "Temp Work: Music and the Cultural Shaping of Time". Musicology Australia. 23(1): 160–175.

McClary, Susan (2001). "The Sense of Music: Semiotic Essays". Notes. 58(2): 326–328.

McClary, Susan (2002). "Fetisch Stimme: Professionelle Sänger im Italien der frühen Neuzeit".

McClary, Susan (2003). "Bessie Smith: ‘Thinking Blues’". The Auditory Culture Reader. pp. 419–426.

McClary, Susan (2004). "The Impromptu that Trod on a Loaf". Narrative Theory: Interdisciplinarity. 4(1): 269. Frith, Simon; Leppert, Richard; McClary, Susan (2004). "Towards an Aesthetic of Popular Music". Popular Music: Critical Concepts in Media and Cultural Studies. 4: 32–47.

Burkholder, J. Peter; Hitchcock, H. Wiley; McClary, Susan; Shelemay, Kay Kaufman (2004). "The Symbiosis of Teaching and Research: A Forum". College Music Symposium. 44: 1–14.

McClary, Susan (2005). "Carmen as Perennial Fusion: From Habanera to Hip-Hop". Critical Studies. 24: 205.

McClary, Susan (2006). "The World According to Taruskin". Music and Letters. 87(3): 408–415.

McClary, Susan (2006). "Mounting Butterflies". In Groth, M.; Lustig, P. (eds.). A Vision of the Orient: Texts, Intertexts, and Contexts of Madame Butterfly. University of Toronto Press.

McClary, Susan (2006). "Introduction: Remembering Philip Brett". In Brett, Philip. Music and Sexuality in Britten: Selected Essays. University of California Press. pp. 1–10.

McClary, Susan (2007). "Minima Romantica". In Scott, Derek B. (ed.). Beyond the Soundtrack: Representing Music in Cinema. University of California Press. pp. 48–65.

McClary, Susan (2007). "Towards a History of Harmonic Tonality". In Christensen, Thomas (ed.). Towards Tonality: Aspects of Baroque Music Theory. Leuven University Press. pp. 91–117.

Vanscheewijck, Marc; Lester, Joel; Jans, Markus; McClary, Susan; Geay, Gérard; Gouk, Penelope (2007). "Thoroughbass as a Path to Composition in the Early Eighteenth Century". In Christensen, Thomas (ed.). Towards Tonality: Aspects of Baroque Music Theory. Leuven University Press. pp. 145–168.

McClary, Susan (2007). "Mediterranean Trade Routes and Music of the Early Seventeenth Century". Inter-American Music Review. 17(1–2): 135–144.

McClary, Susan (2007). "Cycles of Repetition: Chacona, Ciaccona, Chaconne, and the Chaconne". In McClary, Susan. Reading Music: Selected Essays. Ashgate.

McClary, Susan (2008). "Playing the Identity Card: Of Grieg, Indians, and Women". 19th-Century Music. 31(3): 217–227.

McClary, Susan (2009). "More Pomo than Thou: The Status of Cultural Meanings in Music". New Formations. 28.

McClary, Susan (2009). "Adorno Plays the ‘WTC’: On Political Theory and Performance". Indiana Theory Review. 27(2): 97–112.

McClary, Susan (2009). "Cambridge Opera Journal at Twenty". Cambridge Opera Journal. 21(2): 105–109. Breyley, G.; Cairns, J.; Colebrook, C.; Connor, S.; Hurley, A. W.; McClary, Susan (2009). "Postmodernism, Music and Cultural Theory". Lawrence & Wishart.

McClary, Susan (2010). "In Praise of Contingency: The Powers and Limits of Theory". Music Theory Online. 16(1).

McClary, Susan (2010). "The Bodies of Angels". In Desvelando el cuerpo: Perspectivas desde las ciencias sociales y humanas.

McClary, Susan (2011). "Feminine Endings at Twenty". Trans. Revista Transcultural de Música. pp. 1–10.

McClary, Susan (2012). "Making Waves: Opening Keynote for the Twentieth Anniversary of the Feminist Theory and Music Conference". Women and Music: A Journal of Gender and Culture. 16(1): 86–96.

McClary, Susan (2012). "The Social History of a Groove: Chacona, Ciaccono, Chaconne, and the Chaconne". In Bloechl, Olivia; Lowe, Melanie; Kallberg, Jeffrey (eds.). Ritual, Routine, and Regime: Repetition in Early Modern British and European Cultures. University of Toronto Press.

McClary, Susan (2012). "Soprano as Fetish: Professional Singers in Early Modern Italy". In McClary, Susan. Desire and Pleasure in Seventeenth-Century Music. University of California Press. pp. 79–103.

McClary, Susan (2013). "Soprano Masculinities". In Bloechl, Olivia (ed.). Masculinity in Opera. Routledge. pp. 33–50.

McClary, Susan (2013). "Introduction: On Bodies, Affects and Cultural Identities in the Seventeenth Century". In McClary, Susan (ed.). Structures of Feeling in Seventeenth-Century Cultural Expression. University of Toronto Press. pp. 3–18.

Rambuss, Richard; McClary, Susan (2013). "Crashaw and the Metaphysical Shudder; Or, How to Do Things with Tears". In McClary, Susan (ed.). Structures of Feeling in Seventeenth-Century Cultural Expression. University of Toronto Press.

McClary, Susan; Guldbrandsen, Erling E.; Johnson, Julian (2015). "The Lure of the Sublime: Revisiting the Modernist Project". In Guldbrandsen, Erling E.; Johnson, Julian (eds.). Transformations of Musical Modernism. Cambridge University Press. pp. 21–35.

McClary, Susan (2015). "Music as Social Meaning". In Shepherd, John; Devine, Kyle (eds.). The Routledge Reader on the Sociology of Music. Routledge. pp. 79–85.

McClary, Susan (2015). "Ouverture féministe: musique genre sexualité". Cité de la Musique.

McClary, Susan (2015). "Writing about Music—and the Music of Writing". In Bérubé, Michael; Ruth, Jennifer (eds.). The Future of Scholarly Writing: Critical Interventions. Palgrave Macmillan. pp. 205–214.

McClary, Susan (2015). "Feminist Bir Müzik Eleştirisine Doğru". Partisyon Müzik ve Düşünce Dergisi. 4(4).

McClary, Susan (2016). "From the Universal and Timeless to the Here and Now: Rethinking Music Studies". In Heile, Björn; Wilson, Eva; Scheding, Florian (eds.). Music's Immanent Future. Ashgate. pp. 25–35.

McClary, Susan (2016). "Evidence of Things Not Seen: History, Subjectivities, Music". In Heile, Björn (ed.). Critical Musicological Reflections. Routledge. pp. 21–38.

McClary, Susan; Cheng, William (2016). "Foreword: Humanizing the Humanities". In Cheng, William. Just Vibrations: The Purpose of Sounding Good. University of Michigan Press.

McClary, Susan (2017). "Peter Franklin’s Guilty Pleasures". In Franklin, Peter. Music, Modern Culture, and the Critical Ear. Routledge. pp. 13–21.

McClary, Susan (2019). "Lives in Musicology". Acta Musicologica. 91(1): 5–20. de Boise, Sam; McClary, Susan (2019). "An Interview with Professor Susan McClary: The Development of Research on Gender and Music". Per Musi. pp. 1–9.

McClary, Susan; Warwick, Jacqueline (2019). "Genders, Genres, Generations: Jacqueline Warwick and Susan McClary in Conversation". In Stras, Laurie (ed.). Popular Music and the Politics of Hope: Queer and Feminist Interventions. Routledge. pp. 231–246.

McClary, Susan (2020). "The Classical Closet". In Lee, Gavin (ed.). Popular Musicology and Identity. Routledge. pp. 50–59.

Macarthur, Sally; McClary, Susan; Wood, Elizabeth; Lochhead, Judy; Shaw, Jennifer; Rodger, Gillian (2024). "Reconfiguring Gender, Sexuality, Music, and Higher Education". In Doggett, Rachel; Araste, Marianne (eds.). Cultures of Work, the Neoliberal Environment and Music in Higher Education. Palgrave Macmillan.

McClary, Susan (2024). "Mahler Making Love: Mengelberg’s Adagietto". 19th-Century Music. 47(3): 219–238.
