= Philip Brett =

American musicologist (1937–2002)

- Born: October 17, 1937; Edwinstowe, England
- Died: October 16, 2002 (aged 64); Los Angeles, California, U.S.
- Education: BA, MusB, PhD, University of Cambridge
- Occupations: Musicologist and conductor
- Known for: Studies of Benjamin Britten and William Byrd

Philip Brett (October 17, 1937 – October 16, 2002) was a British-born American musicologist, musician and conductor. He was particularly known for his scholarly studies on Benjamin Britten and William Byrd and for his contributions to the development of lesbian and gay musicology. At the time of his death, he was Distinguished Professor of Musicology at the University of California, Los Angeles.

== Life and career ==
Philip Brett was born in Edwinstowe, a coal-mining village in north Nottinghamshire, England. His father was a coal miner and his mother a school teacher. He was educated first at the choir school of Southwell Minster and then attended King's College, Cambridge, as a choral scholar. He received his BA degree from Cambridge in 1958 and a MusB in 1961, studying under Philip Radcliffe, Boris Ord and Thurston Dart. After a year studying at University of California, Berkeley with Joseph Kerman, he returned to Cambridge as a Fellow of King's College and completed his PhD there in 1965. He wrote his doctoral dissertation on the songs of William Byrd, a composer on whom Brett would write extensively throughout his career. In 1966 he joined the faculty of the University of California, Berkeley and remained there for nearly 25 years. He was made a full professor in 1978 and went on to become chairman of the music department in 1988. During his time at Berkeley, he became a naturalised US citizen and participated in the musical life of the university both as a recitalist and as a choral conductor in addition to his teaching.

In 1991, Brett moved to University of California, Riverside to be with his long-term partner, George Haggerty, a professor of English there. He was appointed Associate Dean of Humanities, Arts, and Social Sciences at Riverside in 1998, a position which he held until 2001 when he became Distinguished Professor of Musicology at University of California, Los Angeles. Brett died of cancer in Los Angeles at the age of 64, a year after taking up his appointment at UCLA. On the sixth anniversary of his death, the University of California, Riverside dedicated the Philip Brett Memorial Peace Garden, a traditional Japanese Karesansui designed by Takeo Uesugi. The annual Philip Brett Award from the American Musicological Society honors exceptional musicological work in the field of gay, lesbian, bisexual, transgender/transsexual studies.

=== Musicologist ===
As a musicologist, Brett was known for his scholarly studies on William Byrd and Benjamin Britten. The two English composers were separated by almost four centuries, but united in Brett's view by their positions as 'outsiders' in their respective societies—Byrd as a Roman Catholic during the English Reformation and Britten as a closeted homosexual. Overlapping with these themes, was the other area in which Brett made a major, if at times controversial contribution—the development of lesbian and gay musicology.

Brett's earliest scholarship was in music of the Tudor period. While studying for his doctorate with Thurston Dart, he found over 50 music manuscripts from a single documented scriptorium, and identified the hitherto anonymous songs for voice and viols in one of the manuscripts as late works of William Byrd. He edited the whole corpus for Musica Britannica in 1967 and Byrd's own songs separately in 1970. Brett collaborated with Dart in revising a series by Edmund Fellowes on English madrigal composers. He also revised one of the volumes in the Collected Works of William Byrd (another Fellowes project) and demonstrated the doubtful authenticity of many of the pieces which Fellowes had attributed to Byrd. On Dart's recommendation, Brett was appointed General Editor of the new seventeen-volume Byrd Edition, which revised (and in some cases replaced) the work begun by Fellowes. Brett worked on the series right up until his death and edited several of the volumes himself. The final volume was published in 2005. According to Anthony Bye writing in The Musical Times, it was to become the first modern multi-volume, critical edition of a major English composer to reach completion. The extensive introductions which Brett had written to the volumes on Byrd's Gradualia were published posthumously as a separate monograph in William Byrd and His Contemporaries: Essays and a Monograph (2007).

In 1976, Brett delivered a paper on Benjamin Britten's opera Peter Grimes at a national meeting of the American Musicological Society. The paper, published as an article by The Musical Times the following year, proposed that study of Britten's sexual identity could illuminate the interpretation of his music. It was the first time that this aspect of Britten had been considered in print. Britten's homosexuality had previously been what Antony Bye described as "off limits, an 'open secret' recognised but not publicly acknowledged." The reaction was mixed, and when Brett initially submitted the paper to The Musical Quarterly for publication, the then editor, Joan Peyser, dismissed it as "a personality study". However, Brett continued to explore the relationship between Britten's sexuality and his operas. In the succeeding years he wrote a series of influential articles and books both on Britten and on the more general implications of gay and lesbian sexuality in music. The discipline gradually entered the academic mainstream as part of the 'new musicology' with the American Musicological Society's Gay and Lesbian Study Group (co-founded by Brett) established in 1989. The 2001 edition of the New Grove Dictionary of Music and Musicians, contained, for the first time in its history, an article on gay and lesbian music (co-written by Philip Brett and Elizabeth Wood).

=== Conductor and musician ===
From 1966 to 1991, Brett was the conductor of the University of California, Berkeley Chamber Chorus. As a choral conductor, he received the American Musicological Society's Noah Greenberg Award in 1980 for the performances of Jacopo Peri's Euridice and Monteverdi's Orfeo as well as motets from Byrd's Gradualia. His 1990 recording of Handel's oratorio Susanna was nominated for a Grammy Award (Best Choral Performance). Brett also played the harpsichord and Renaissance organ in some of these performances, as well as giving solo harpsichord recitals. Although most of his performances and recordings were of Renaissance and Baroque music, he also participated in the recordings of 20th century works including Lou Harrison's La koro sutro (1988) and Morton Feldman's Rothko Chapel (1991).

Recordings

- Harrison: La koro sutro, New Albion Records, 1988
- Handel: Susanna, Harmonia Mundi, 1990
- Morton Feldman: Rothko Chapel, New Albion Records, 1991
- Handel: Messiah, Harmonia Mundi, 1991
- Handel: Theodora, Harmonia Mundi, 1992

== Selected bibliography ==
Brett published many articles, monographs, books, and critical editions of scores during his lifetime. The following is an indicative bibliography of key works over the course of his career.

Articles

- "The English Consort Song, 1570-1625", Journal of the Royal Musical Association, Volume 88, Issue 1, 1961, pp. 73–88
- "Word-Setting in the Songs of Byrd", Journal of the Royal Musical Association, Volume 98, Issue 1, 1971, pp. 47–64
- "Britten and Grimes", The Musical Times, Vol. 118, No. 1618, December 1977, pp. 995–1000
- "Homage to Taverner in Byrd's masses", Early Music, Volume 9, No.2, 1981, pp. 169–176
- "Homosexuality and Music: A Conversation with Philip Brett" in Lawrence Mass (ed.), Dialogues of the Sexual Revolution: Homosexuality as Behavior and Identity, Routledge, 1990
- "Musicality, essentialism, and the closet" and "Eros and Orientalism in Britten's Operas" in Queering the Pitch: The New Gay and Lesbian Musicology, Routledge, 1994
- "Piano Four-Hands: Schubert and the Performance of Gay Male Desire", 19th-Century Music, Vol. 21, No. 2, Franz Schubert: Bicentenary Essays, Autumn 1997, pp. 149–176

Single-authored books

- Benjamin Britten, Peter Grimes, Cambridge University Press, 1983
- Music and Sexuality in Britten, University of California Press, 2006
- William Byrd and his Contemporaries, University of California Press, 2007

Edited books

- Queering the Pitch: The New Gay and Lesbian Musicology, Philip Brett, Elizabeth Wood and Gary Thomas (editors), Routledge, 1994
- Cruising the Performative: Interventions into the Representation of Ethnicity, Nationality, and Sexuality, Sue-Ellen Case, Philip Brett, Susan Leigh Foster (editors), Indiana University Press, 1995
- Decomposition: Post-disciplinary Performance, Sue-Ellen Case, Philip Brett, Susan Leigh Foster (editors), Indiana University Press, 2000

Edited scores

- John Taverner, The Western Wynde Mass, Stainer & Bell, 1962; Mater Christi, Stainer & Bell, 1964
- Consort Songs, (Musica Britannica 22), Royal Music Association, 1967
- Thomas Tallis, Spem in Alium (revised edition), Oxford University Press, 1969; The Lamentations of Jeremiah, Oxford University Press, 1969.
- William Byrd, The Byrd Edition, Stainer & Bell. Completed in 2005, the new Byrd Edition was under the General Editorship of Philip Brett, who also edited the following volumes:
  - Vol. 4 The Masses, 1981
  - Vol. 5 Gradualia I (1605): The Marian Masses, 1989.
  - Vol. 6a Gradualia I (1605): All Saints and Corpus Christi, 1991.
  - Vol. 6b Gradualia I (1605): Other Feasts and Devotions, 1993.
  - Vol. 7a Gradualia II (1607): Christmas to Easter, 1997.
  - Vol. 7b Gradualia II (1607): Ascension, Pentecost and the Feasts of Saints Peter and Paul, 1997.
  - Vol. 15 Consort Songs for Voice and Viols, 1970.
  - Vol. 16 Madrigals, Songs and Canons, 1976.

== Sources ==
- Adams, Byron; Kerman, Joseph; McClary, Susan; and Moroney, Davitt, In Memoriam: Philip Brett, Academic Senate of the University of California, 2002. Accessed 13 September 2010.
- Adams, Byron, "Philip Brett, Gay musicologist who radicalised his subject", The Guardian, October 31, 2002. Accessed 13 September 2010.
- Anderson, Martin, "Professor Philip Brett, Outstanding musicologist and conductor", The Independent, October 21, 2002. Accessed 13 September 2010.
- Brett, Philip, "Homosexuality and Music: A Conversation with Philip Brett" in Lawrence Mass (ed.), Dialogues of the Sexual Revolution: Homosexuality as Behavior and Identity, Routledge, 1990. ISBN 1-56024-046-6
- Brett, Philip, Music and Sexuality in Britten: Selected Essays, University of California Press, 2006. ISBN 0-520-24610-1
- Brett, Philip, and Wood, Elizabeth, "Lesbian and Gay Music" (the uncut version of the article which appeared as "Gay and lesbian music" in the New Grove Dictionary of Music and Musicians second edition), Electronic Musicological Review, Volume VII, December 2002. Accessed 13 September 2010.
- Bye, Antony (January 2002). "In memoriam: Philip Brett". The Musical Times. Archived from the original on 4 November 2012 – via HighBeam Research.
- Church, Michael, "How music got its Grove back", The Independent, 30 December 2000. Accessed 13 September 2010.
- San Jose Mercury News, "Respected Musician Leaves UC Post for a New Job—and Love", July 29, 1990, p. 5 (Arts section). Accessed 13 September 2010.
- Scott, David and Morgan, Paula. "Brett, Philip", Grove Music Online, ed. L. Macy. Accessed via subscription 12 September 2010.
- The Times, "Philip Brett, Musicologist who outed Benjamin Britten and edited William Byrd", November 4, 2002. Accessed 13 September 2010.
