= Joseph Kerman =

American musicologist and music critic (1924–2014)

- Born: April 3, 1924; London, United Kingdom
- Died: March 17, 2014 (aged 89); Berkeley, California, U.S.
- Education: University College School; New York University
- Occupations: Musicologist; Music critic
- Organizations: Harvard University

Joseph Wilfred Kerman (3 April 1924 – 17 March 2014) was an American musicologist and music critic. Among the leading musicologists of his generation, his 1985 book Contemplating Music: Challenges to Musicology (published in the UK as Musicology) was described by Philip Brett in The Grove Dictionary of Music and Musicians as "a defining moment in the field". He was Professor Emeritus of Musicology at the University of California, Berkeley.

== Life and career ==
Kerman, the son of an American journalist, William Zukerman, was born in London and educated at University College School there. He then attended New York University where he received his BA in 1943 and Princeton University where he received his PhD in 1950. While at Princeton he studied under Oliver Strunk, Randall Thompson and Carl Weinrich and wrote his doctoral thesis on the Elizabethan madrigal. When young, he used Kerman as a pen-name, and then adopted it officially. From 1949 to 1951 he taught at Westminster Choir College in Princeton. He then joined the faculty of University of California, Berkeley where he became a full professor in 1960 and was chairman of the music department from 1960 to 1963. In 1971, he was appointed Heather Professor of Music at Oxford University, a post he held until 1974, when he returned to Berkeley and again became chairman of the music department from 1991 until his retirement in 1994.

He based his first book, Opera as Drama (1956), on a series of essays written for The Hudson Review beginning in 1948. Published in several languages and multiple editions, Opera as Drama expresses Kerman's view that an opera's story is key and provides the basis for the structuring of both the librettist's text (which expresses the narrative) and the composer's music (which expresses the emotions in the story). For Kerman, the value of an opera as drama is undermined when there is a perceived disconnection between text and music. Among the operas Kerman discussed in the book was Puccini's Tosca which he controversially described as a "shabby little shocker". (Kerman's assessment echoed George Bernard Shaw's earlier description of Sardou's play La Tosca on which the opera was based as an "empty-headed turnip ghost of a cheap shocker".

His doctoral thesis on Elizabethan madrigals was published in 1962 and was notable for contextualizing them in the preceding Italian madrigal tradition. He maintained an interest in the English madrigal composer William Byrd throughout his career, and wrote several influential monographs on his work. He wrote a widely popular book on the Beethoven string quartets in the style of Donald Tovey. With his wife, Vivian Kerman, he wrote the widely used textbook, Listen, first published in 1972 and now in its sixth edition co-authored by Gary Tomlinson. In 1985 he published his history and critique of traditional musicology, Contemplating Music: Challenges to Musicology, which argued that the intellectual isolation of musical theorists and musicologists and their excessively positivistic approach had hampered the development of serious musical criticism. Described in The Grove Dictionary of Music and Musicians as "a defining moment in the field", the book has been credited as helping to shape a "new musicology" that is willing to engage with feminist theory, hermeneutics, queer studies, and post-structuralism.

From 1997 to 1998 Kerman held the Charles Eliot Norton Memorial Chair at Harvard University, where he gave a series of public lectures on the importance of approaching musical texts and performances via a "close reading" similar to that used in literary studies, a theme that was central to many of his writings. The Norton lectures were published in 1998 as Concerto Conversations. Kerman has written regularly for The New York Review of Books since 1977 and was a founding editor of the journal, 19th-Century Music. Critical essays written by Kerman from the late 1950s to the early 1990s are collected in his 1994 book, Write All These Down, which takes its title from a phrase in one of William Byrd's songs.

== Honours ==
Joseph Kerman was elected Honorary Fellow of the Royal Academy of Music in 1972, Fellow of the American Academy of Arts and Sciences in 1973, and member of the American Philosophical Society in 2002. He also received ASCAP's Deems Taylor Award for excellence in writing on music in 1981 and 1995, and the Otto Kinkeldey Award from the American Musicological Society for an outstanding work of musicological scholarship in 1970 and 1981.

== Death and obituaries ==
Kerman died at his home in Berkeley on 17 March 2014. He was 89.

In addition to obituaries which appeared in the days following his death, two of his former associates in the field of musicology, Roger Parker and Carolyn Abbate, published some additional comments about working with Kerman in the obituary which they wrote for the British magazine, Opera. There, they conclude that "the usual obituary language would not work" and continue:

We share a very vivid memory of Joe as editor. It takes the form of a mysterious wavy line, which he was wont to draw in the margin of this or that paragraph we had nervously proffered. This undemonstrative graphic gesture would say it all: telling us to think again, to re-draft, to watch the rhythms, the cadence of the words. He could communicate so sparsely because one of his many gifts was to inspire you, as a writer, by the persuasiveness, energy, and beauty of his prose; you came to live for the—rarely bestowed—small check marks that signalled approval; the wavy line could keep you awake at night.

They continue by reflecting on their own professional relationships with Kerman over the years:

Joe published both of our first essays on opera in 19th-Century Music, the journal he helped to establish; he gave one of us a first academic job and lured the other to Berkeley as a visiting lecturer; he edited our first collaborative book; we dedicated our second to him. Ever patient, ever smiling, he formed us—sometimes sentence-by-sentence.

== Selected bibliography ==
- Opera as Drama (1952)
- The Elizabethan Madrigal (1962)
- The Beethoven Quartets (1967)
- The Kafka Sketchbook (1970)
- The Masses and Motets of William Byrd (1980)
- The New Grove Beethoven (1983) (with Alan Tyson)
- Contemplating Music: Challenges to Musicology (1985) (UK title: Musicology)
- Write All These Down: Essays on Music (1994)
- Concerto Conversations (1998)
- The Art of Fugue: Bach Fugues for Keyboard, 1715-1750 (2005)
- Opera and the Morbidity of Music (2008)
