= Edwinstowe =

Village and civil parish in Nottinghamshire, England

Coordinates: 53.16°N 1.07°W

- Village and civil parish
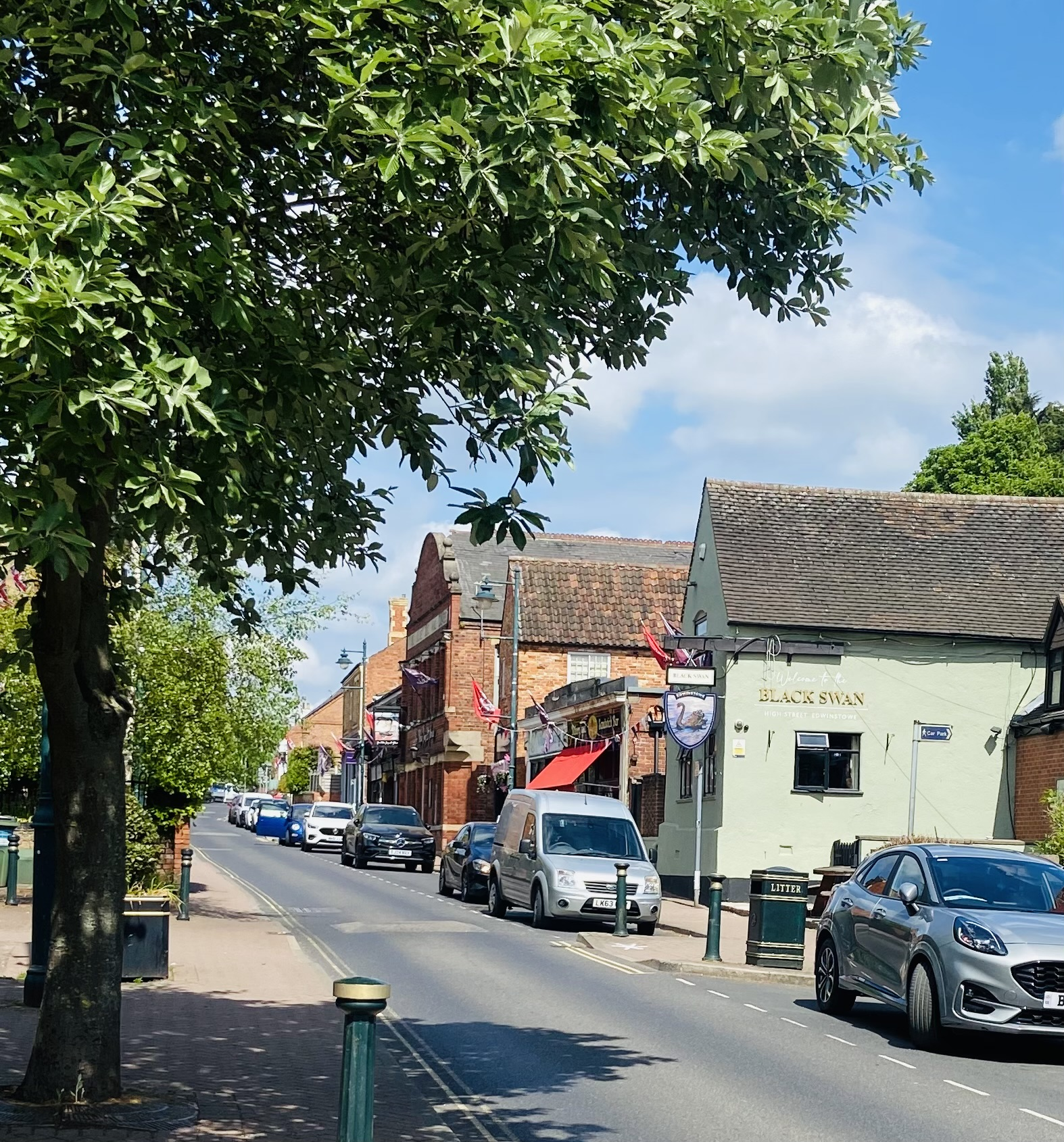
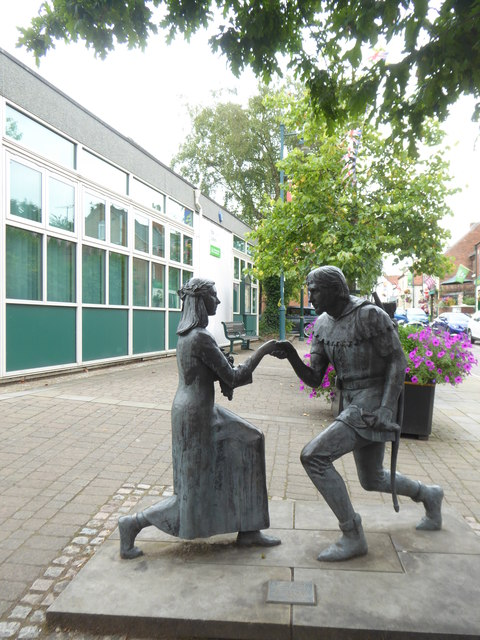
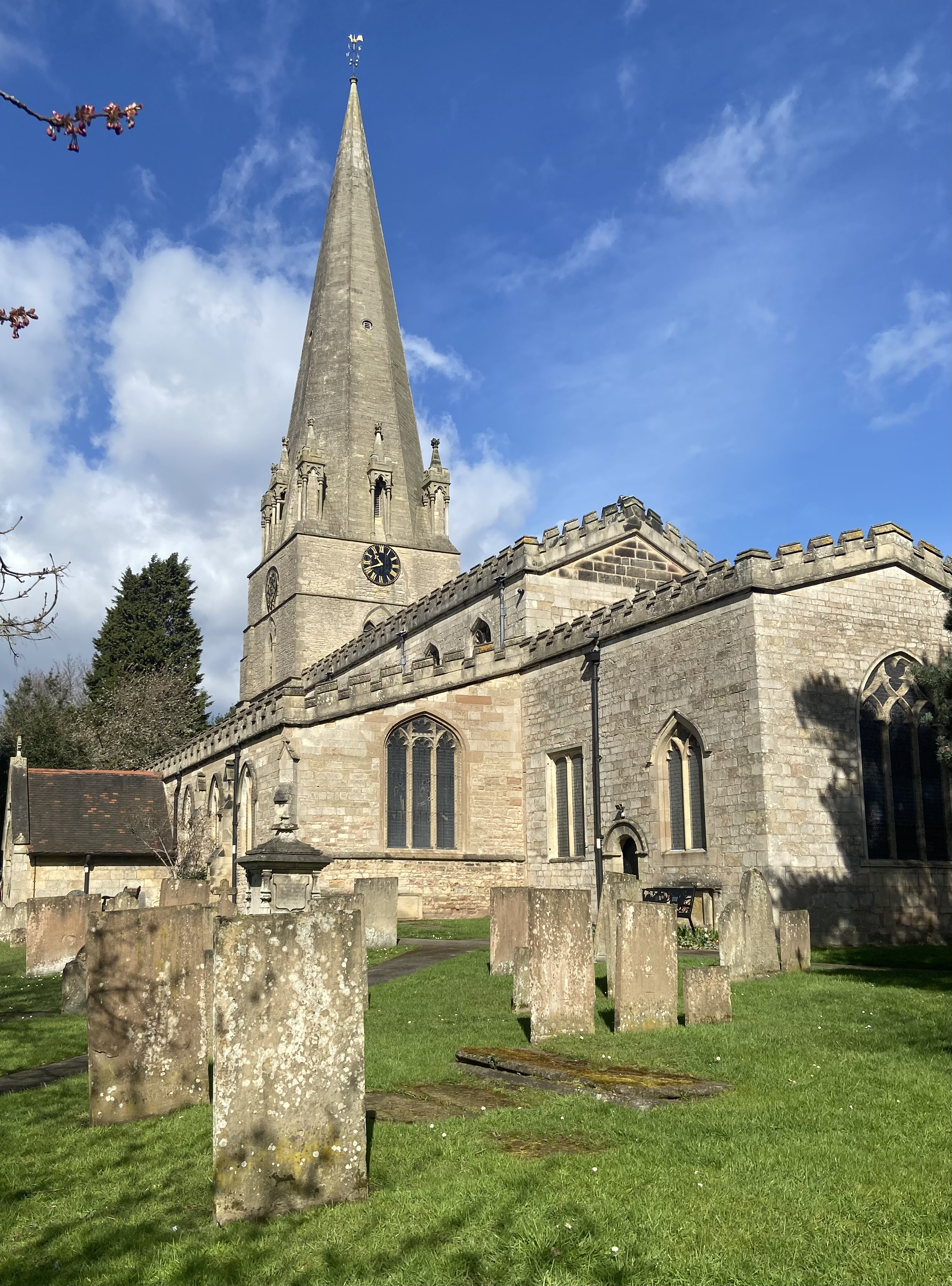
- High Street Robin Hood and Maid Marian statue St Mary’s Church

- Location within Nottinghamshire
- Interactive map of Edwinstowe
- Area: 6.8 sq mi (18 km^{2})
- Population: 5,320 (2021)
  - Density: 782/sq mi (302/km^{2})
- OS grid reference: SK 6266
  - London: 120 mi (190 km) SSE
- District: Newark and Sherwood
- Shire county: Nottinghamshire
- Region: East Midlands
- Country: England
- Sovereign state: United Kingdom
- Post town: Mansfield
- Postcode district: NG21
- Dialling code: 01623
- Police: Nottinghamshire
- Fire: Nottinghamshire
- Ambulance: East Midlands
- UK Parliament: Sherwood
- Website: www.edwinstowe.co.uk

Edwinstowe is a village and civil parish in the Newark and Sherwood district of Nottinghamshire, England, on the edge of Sherwood Forest and the Dukeries. It is associated with the legends of Robin Hood and Maid Marian, and to a lesser extent Edwin of Northumbria, from where the village gets its name. The parish population at the 2021 census was 5,320.

== Etymology ==
The etymology of the village name, "Edwin's resting place". Edwin of Northumbria, King and Saint, was killed in the Battle of Hatfield Chase against his rival King Penda of Mercia. His body was buried in the forest, by the time his friends came to collect him to take him to be buried in York in 633AD, a small wooden chapel had been erected. This chapel became St Mary's Church which exists today.

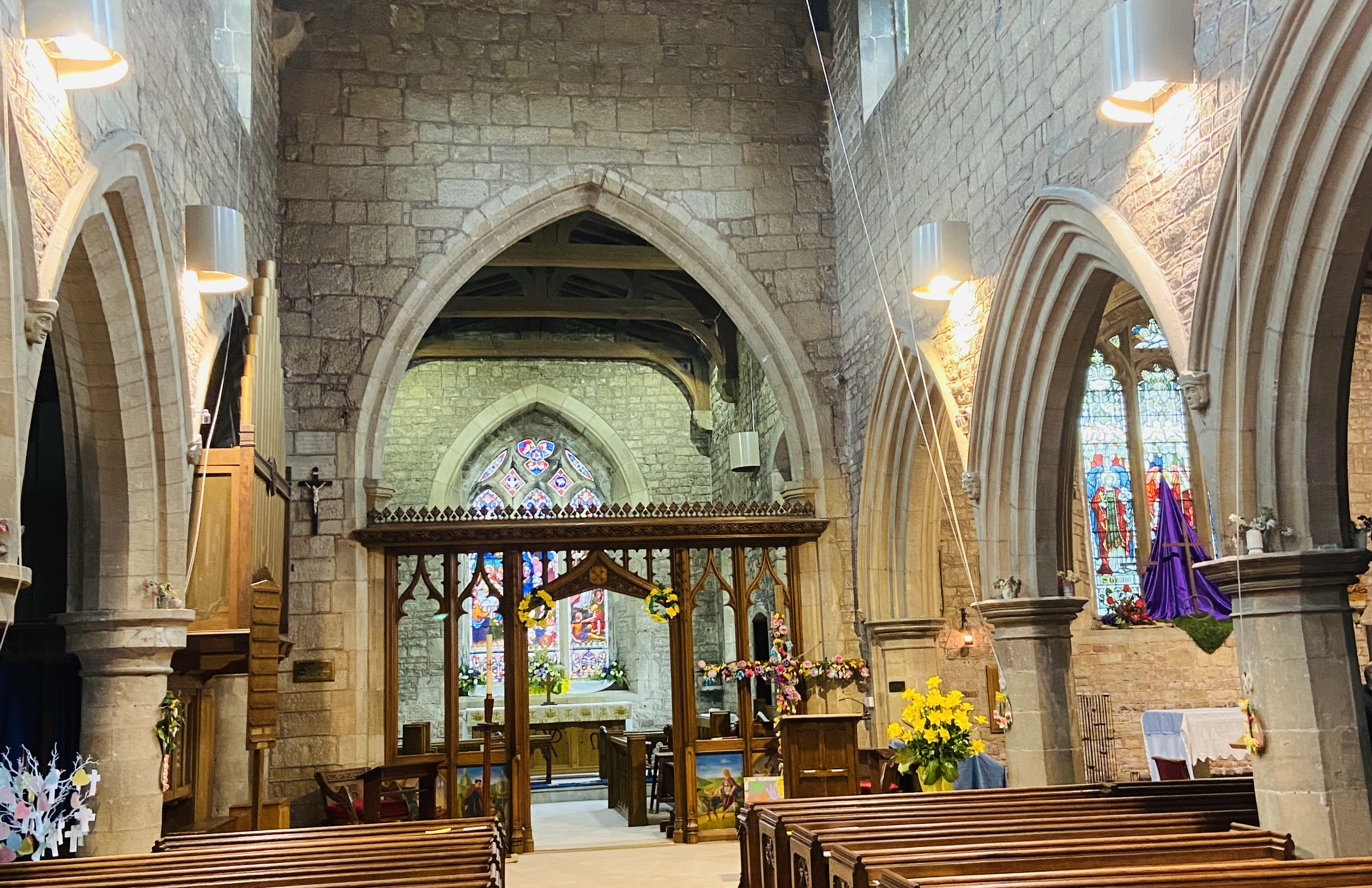
The interior of St Mary's Church, Edwinstowe

== History ==
Like Thoresby, Budby and Mansfield, Edwinstowe was part of crown land. Edwinstowe belonged to Edward the Confessor and afterwards became the property of William the Conqueror.

Edwinstowe is referred to twice in Domesday Book as having five households, in addition to a priest and his four bordars, in 1086. The village resided in the hundred of Bassetlaw.

Edwinstowe in 1334 being close to Sherwood Forest was subjected to Forest Laws. Vicar John de Ryston of St Mary's Church was convicted of Venison trespass and in 1340 Thomas Fox, vicar, was imprisoned in Nottingham for trespassing in Sherwood Forest.

Legend has it that Robin Hood married Maid Marian in St Mary's Church. A sculpture themed on the pair by Neale Andrew is sited on the High Street close to the library.

Edwinstowe is known for the presence near the village of the Major Oak in Sherwood Forest, a feature in the folk tales of Robin Hood, and Robin Hood's Larder. The Major Oak was declared dead in June 2026 by managing authority RSPB.

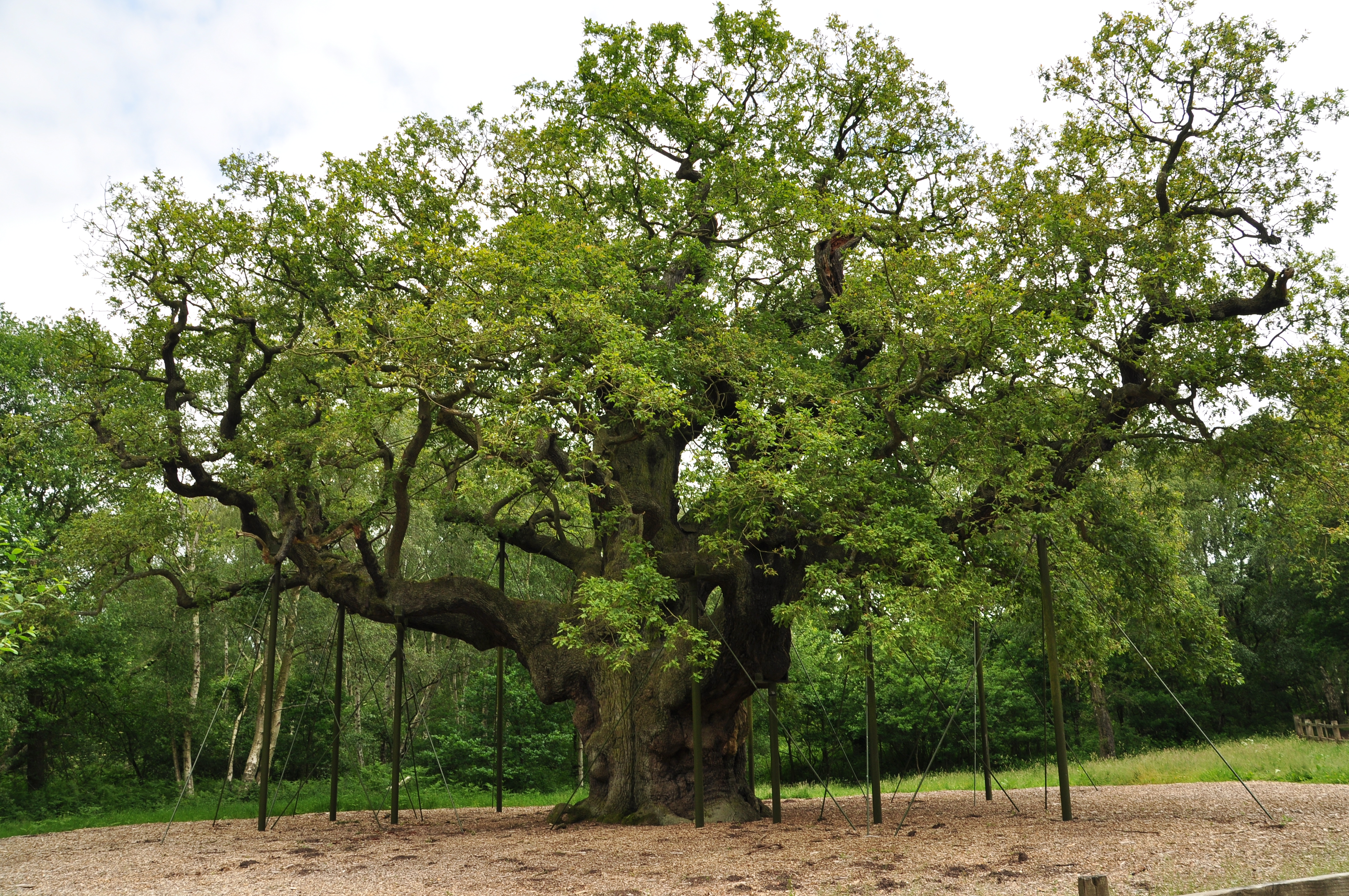
The Major Oak in 2014

By the turn of the 20th century Edwinstowe consisted of a cluster of houses along Town Street, East Lane, Church Street and High Street. A hamlet called Hazel Grove was bordered by Mill Lane and the railway line and a cluster of houses at the top of Rufford Road was another hamlet called Lidgett. Lidgett was the site of a fireworks factory owned by F. Tudsbury and Co. before George Pinder, a local wine, spirit and porter merchant who resided at Lidgett House, took over ownership by 1886. These settlements eventually merged as the result of infills from World War I, much of it housing for colliers and named after the largest area.

== Economy ==
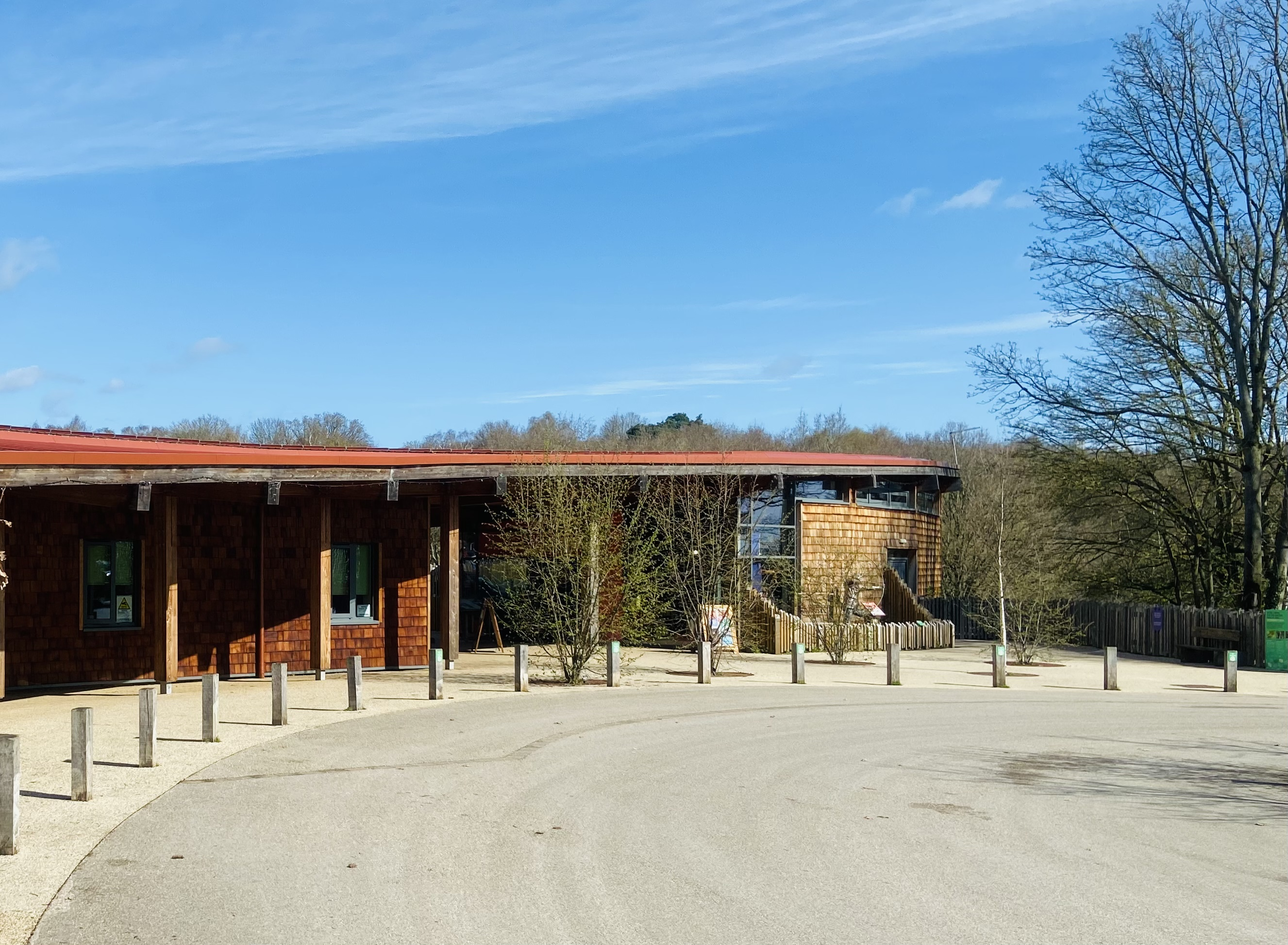
The Visitor Centre

Tourism is the main factor in the local economy. Nottinghamshire County Council's Sherwood Forest Visitors' Centre is located near the village and was redeveloped and improved in 2017 at a cost of £5.3 million. This centre is operated in partnership by the Council and the RSPB.

Center Parcs' Sherwood Forest holiday complex is a local employer established in 1987, close to the edge of the village.

There was a post windmill south of the Mansfield Road with a small box-style roundhouse. It was driven by two common and two double-patent windmill sails.

== Colliery village ==
Thoresby Colliery was established in the late 1920s and its dedicated model village is one of several associated with colliery owners the Bolsover Colliery Company. The colliery institute (or welfare) owned by CISWO, closed in 2012 due to poor trading conditions and was demolished in 2014. The Fourth Avenue site now has a residential care facility.

The colliery served as Edwinstowe's main source of employment until July 2015, when the mine was permanently closed and has been demolished. The colliery site has become a large housing development for 800 homes, to make use of the brownfield site.

== Amenities ==
The two schools in the village are St Mary's Primary School and King Edwin Primary School. The former Rufford School on the north side of the village closed in 2003 and has become residential housing by Barratt Developments, known as Friars Park. A skate park on the development proved controversial with concerns over noise and anti-social behaviour.

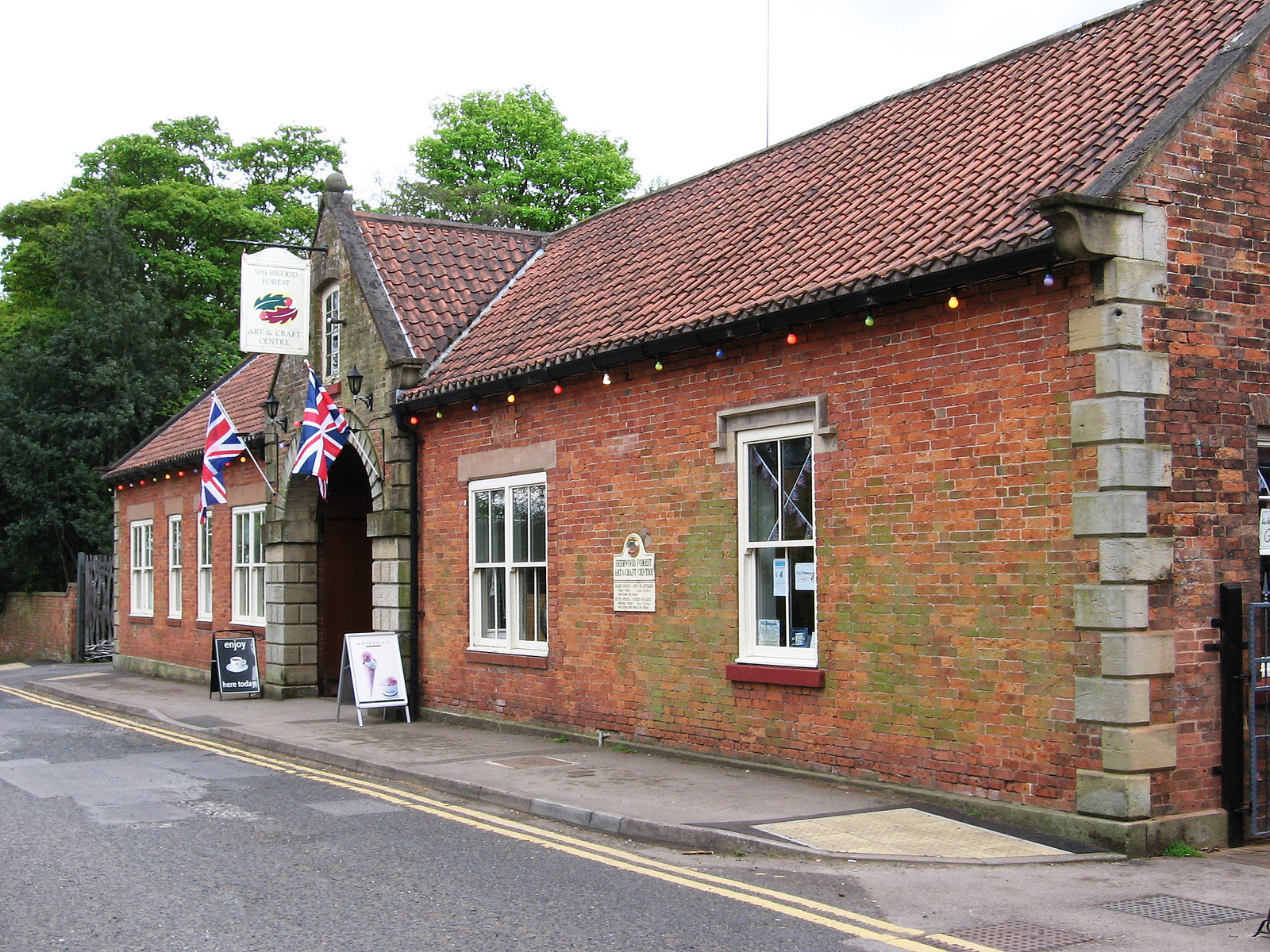
Sherwood Forest Art & Craft Centre, Forest Corner (off the B6034 Swinecote Road, Edwinstowe towards Budby road). They were originally stables for Edwinstowe Hall, then used as laboratories for the coal mining industry.

The village has a business services provider, a St John's Ambulance amenity, an antiques centre, workshops, a fun park, a youth hostel, two arts and crafts centres, a village hall, and a community pest-control centre. Leisure facilities include Thoresby Colliery Band and Youth Band, a high-wire forest adventure course, a mountain biking, cyclo cross and forest walks centre, a forest fun park, and an outdoor adventure park.

Environmental concerns are addressed under the Maun Valley Project Conservation Area.

The old library was re-purposed into a cafe.

Sherwood Pines Forest Park, near to Kings Clipstone has activity walking/cycling trails, play areas and bike hire for the general public. Sherwood Pines is managed by the Forestry Commission. A Go Ape adventure area is on-site too.

== Transport ==
Edwinstowe railway station functioned between 1897 and 1955. A goods line remains. The nearest passenger railway stations are at Mansfield Woodhouse and Mansfield, both about 6 miles (9.7 km) from Edwinstowe.

The village is served by half-hourly daytime Monday–Saturday bus services to Mansfield and Ollerton, six buses a day Monday–Saturday to Worksop, and one bus a day Monday–Friday to Nottingham. Services run twice a week to Newark and once a week to Lincoln.

== Demography ==
Census population of Edwinstowe parish
Census	Population	Households
2001	4,959	2,118
2011	5,188	2,268
2021	5,320	2,386

== Notable people ==
In order of birth:

- King Edwin of Northumbria (c. 586 – 632/633) gave his name to the village.
- The legendary Robin Hood is said to have married Maid Marian here.
- John Holles, 1st Duke of Newcastle (1662–1711), politician and landowner, was born here.
- Henrietta Harley, Countess of Oxford and Countess Mortimer (1694–1755), noblewoman and heiress was born here.
- E. Cobham Brewer (1810–1897), lexicographer, died at the vicarage, where his son-in-law was the vicar.
- Henry Morley (1852–1924), first-class cricketer, was born and died here.
- Fred Kitchen (1890–1969), countryside writer and autobiographer, was born here.
- Cecil Day-Lewis (1904–1972), Poet Laureate and father of Daniel Day-Lewis and Lydia Tamasin Day-Lewis, lived in Edwinstowe when his father, Frank Cecil Day-Lewis, was appointed vicar of St Mary's Church in 1918.
- Francis Woodhead (1912–1991), first-class cricketer, was born here.
- Philip Brett (1937–2002), musicologist and conductor, was born here.
- Brendan Clarke-Smith (born 1980), Member of Parliament for Bassetlaw, was living in the village in December 2019, but now resides in nearby Retford.

== See also ==
- Listed buildings in Edwinstowe
