= Francis Woodhead =

English cricketer

Francis Gerald Woodhead (30 October 1912 – 24 May 1991) was an English first-class cricketer active 1934–50 who played for Nottinghamshire (awarded county cap in 1937; testimonial in 1979). He was born in Edwinstowe; died in Nottingham.
