= Henry Morley (cricketer, born 1852) =

English cricketer

Henry Morley (1852 – 16 August 1924) was an English first-class cricketer active 1884 who played for Nottinghamshire. He was born and died in Edwinstowe.
