= Fred Kitchen (writer) =

English writer

(William) Frederick Kitchen (28 December 1890 – 16 September 1969) was an English farm labourer and writer. His best known work is Brother to the Ox (1939), which has been adapted for radio and television.

== Life and work ==
Kitchen was born in Edwinstowe in Sherwood Forest in 1890 to a Methodist family. His father was a cowman on the Sandbeck Estate, held by the Earl of Scarbrough, and Fred grew up on the estate, living in a tied cottage. He started work in 1904 as a farmer's boy just after his 13th birthday, in the West Riding of Yorkshire, following the death of his father from diabetes. As the cottage was tied to his father's job, Kitchen and the family were forced to leave. His mother became a needlewoman after her husband's death, taking on work from local manor houses. Kitchen started out as a horseman but went on to work around collieries, and on railways. In 1925, after 13 years working in industrial settings, he became a farm labourer again, in Hooton Levitt, and at Maltby Main.

As a farm labourer with little formal education, Kitchen borrowed extensively from public libraries and became inspired by the works of writers such as Dickens and George Eliot. In 1933, he studied with the local branch of Workers Educational Association (WEA) in Worksop, where he was encouraged to write his own works. He wrote a personal diary for fifty years, which forms a near complete, extant account of his working life. Kitchen became a journalist and radio broadcaster and in later life worked as a school caretaker.

Brother to the Ox is an autobiographical account of a countryman's life during the first half of the twentieth century in Northern England. Unromantic and unconcerned with presenting country living as idyllic as more middle class writers of the time had generally presented it, it may be considered an 'anti-pastoral work'. Unusual for its time, it is a first-hand account of Kitchen's life in coking factories, on the railways, working as a cowman and in mining villages, moving from town to town in search of work. Critic H E Bates wrote of the book: "Mr. Kitchen writes as the grass grows and Brother to the Ox will take its place, for exact and simple beauty, with the best interpretations of the countryside."

The book's title comes from the long poem "The Man With the Hoe" by Edwin Markham

Bowed by the weight of centuries he leans
Upon his hoe and gazes on the ground,
The emptiness of ages in his face,
And on his back the burden of the world.
Who made him dead to rapture and despair,
A thing that grieves not and that never hopes.
Stolid and stunned, a brother to the ox?

The book was adapted by ITV (Brother to the Ox, 1981).

His life story was dramatized from his journals for BBC Radio by Stephen Wakelam, broadcast in two week long serials as Journal of a Joskin (2013 and 2015).

== Books ==
- Brother to the Ox (1939) London: J. M. Dent
- Life on the Land
- Nettleworth Parva
- What the Countryman Wants to Know
- Songs of Sherwood
- Foxendale Farm
- Winter at Foxendale
- More Adventures at Foxendale Farm
- The Farming Front
- Jesse and his Friends
- Goslington, portrait of a village
- The Ploughman Homeward Plods (novel, 1960) London: J. M. Dent
- The Ploughman
- The Commoners
- Settlers in England
- Indian Scenes
