= St Mary's Church, Edwinstowe =

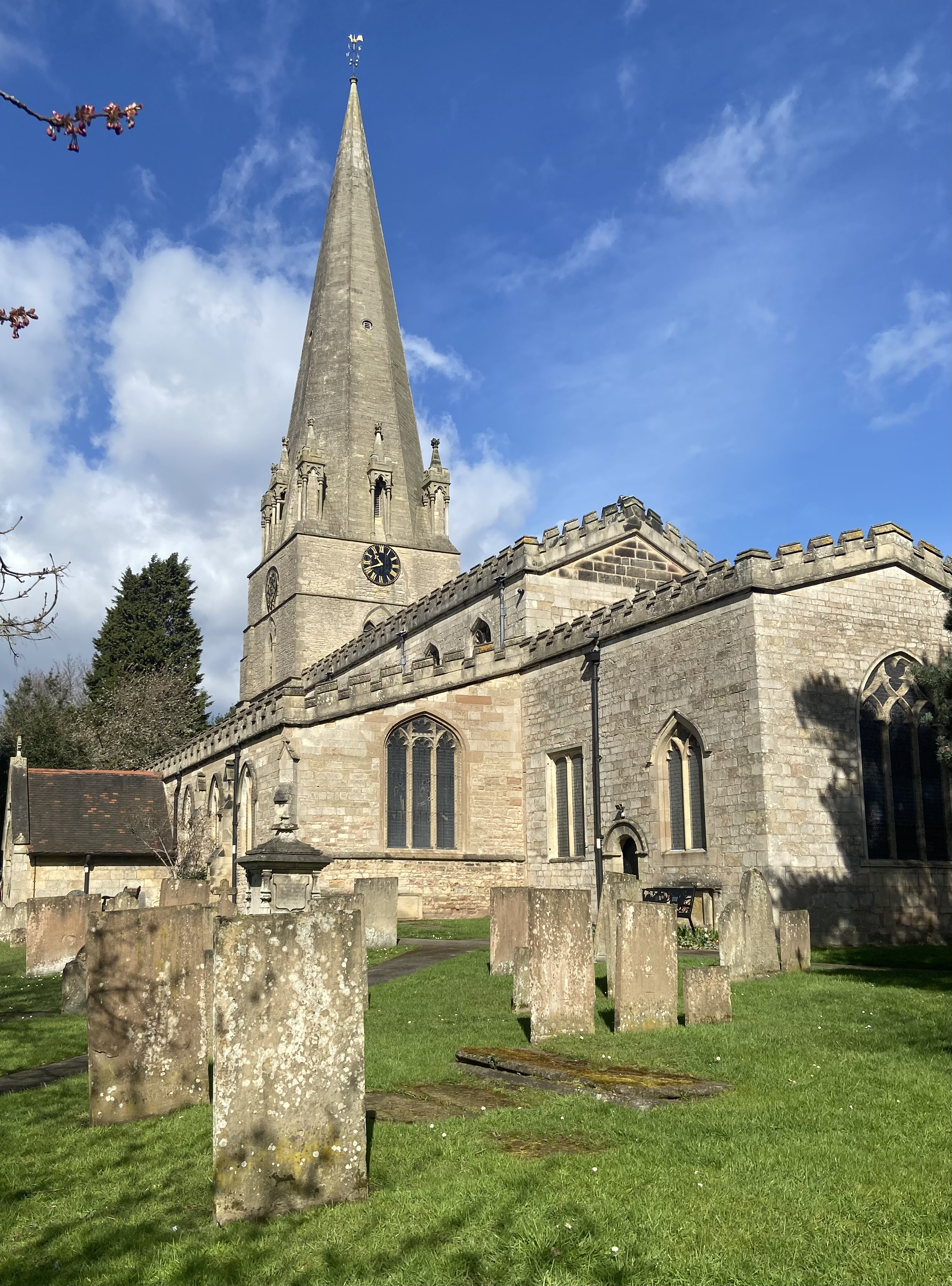
- St Mary's Church
- St Mary's Church, Edwinstowe
- 53°11′43.87″N 1°3′57.38″W
- OS grid reference: SK 62520 66939
- Location: Edwinstowe
- Country: England
- Denomination: Church of England
- Website: churchesofsherwood.org

History
- Dedication: St Mary

Architecture
- Heritage designation

Listed Building – Grade I
- Official name: St Mary's Church, Edwinstowe
- Designated: 11 August 1961
- Reference no.: 1045467

Listed Building – Grade II
- Official name: Boundary Wall, Gate, Steps and Overthrow at Church of St Mary
- Designated: 20 January 1986
- Reference no.
- Completed: 1175

Administration
- Diocese: Diocese of Southwell and Nottingham
- Archdeaconry: Newark
- Deanery: Mansfield
- Parish: Edwinstowe

St Mary's Church is a parish church in the Church of England in Edwinstowe. The church was mentioned in Domesday Book in 1086, given by William II to Lincoln Cathedral.

== History ==
Edwin of Northumbria, King and Saint, was killed in the Battle of Hatfield Chase against his rival King Penda of Mercia. His body was buried in the forest, by the time his friends came to collect him to take him to be buried in York in 633, a small wooden chapel had been erected. This chapel became St Mary’s Church which exists today. The name of the village arrived from King Edwin.

The church dates from around 1175. It was restored in 1869 and 1890. The original wooden church was rebuilt at the time of Henry II.

It is visited by tourists who come to see the church where, according to legend, Robin Hood and Maid Marian were married.

== Organ ==
The organ is by Forster and Andrews dating from 1862. A specification of the organ can be found on the National Pipe Organ Register.

== See also ==
- Grade I listed buildings in Nottinghamshire
- Listed buildings in Edwinstowe

== Gallery ==
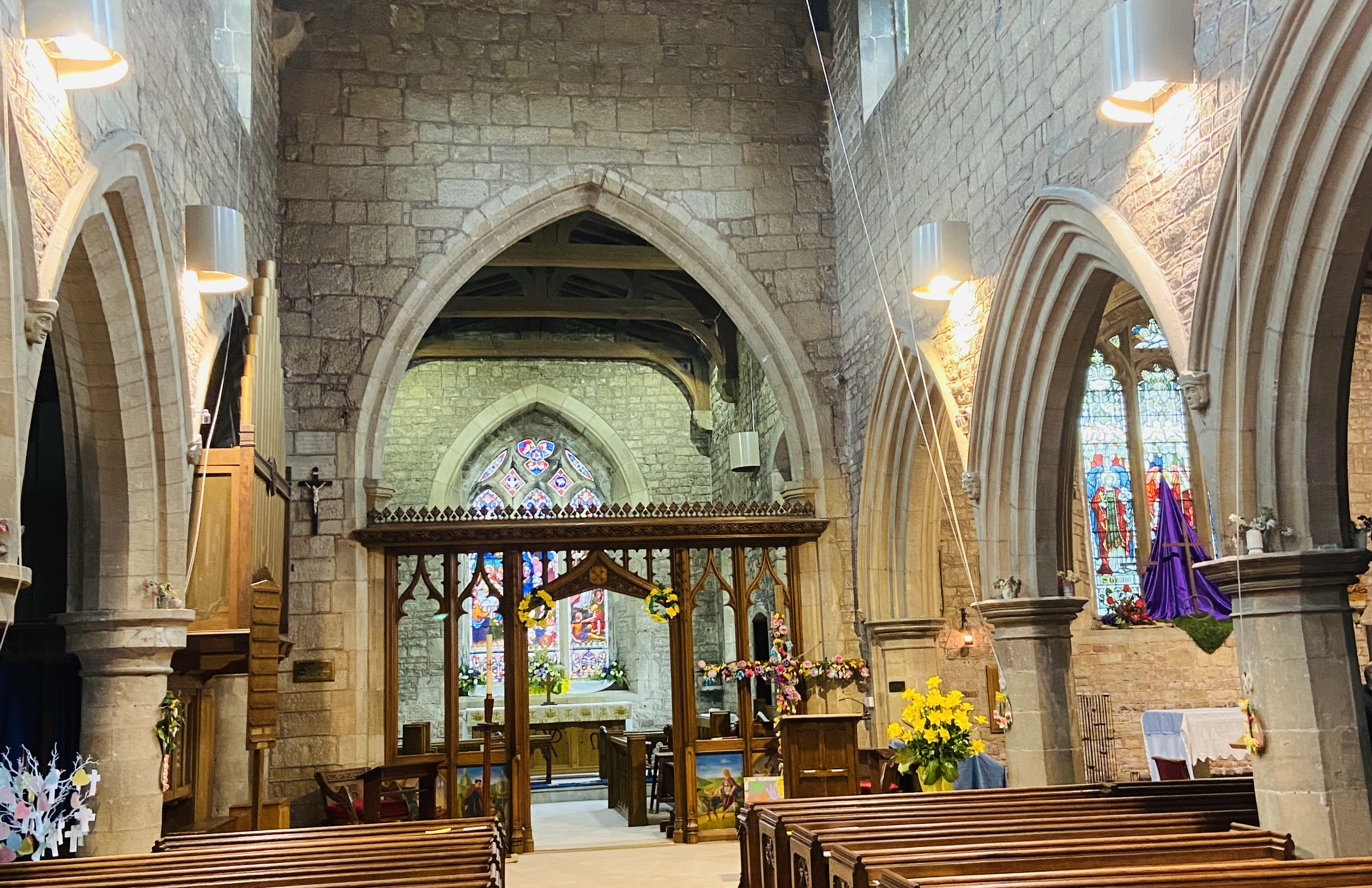
Interior

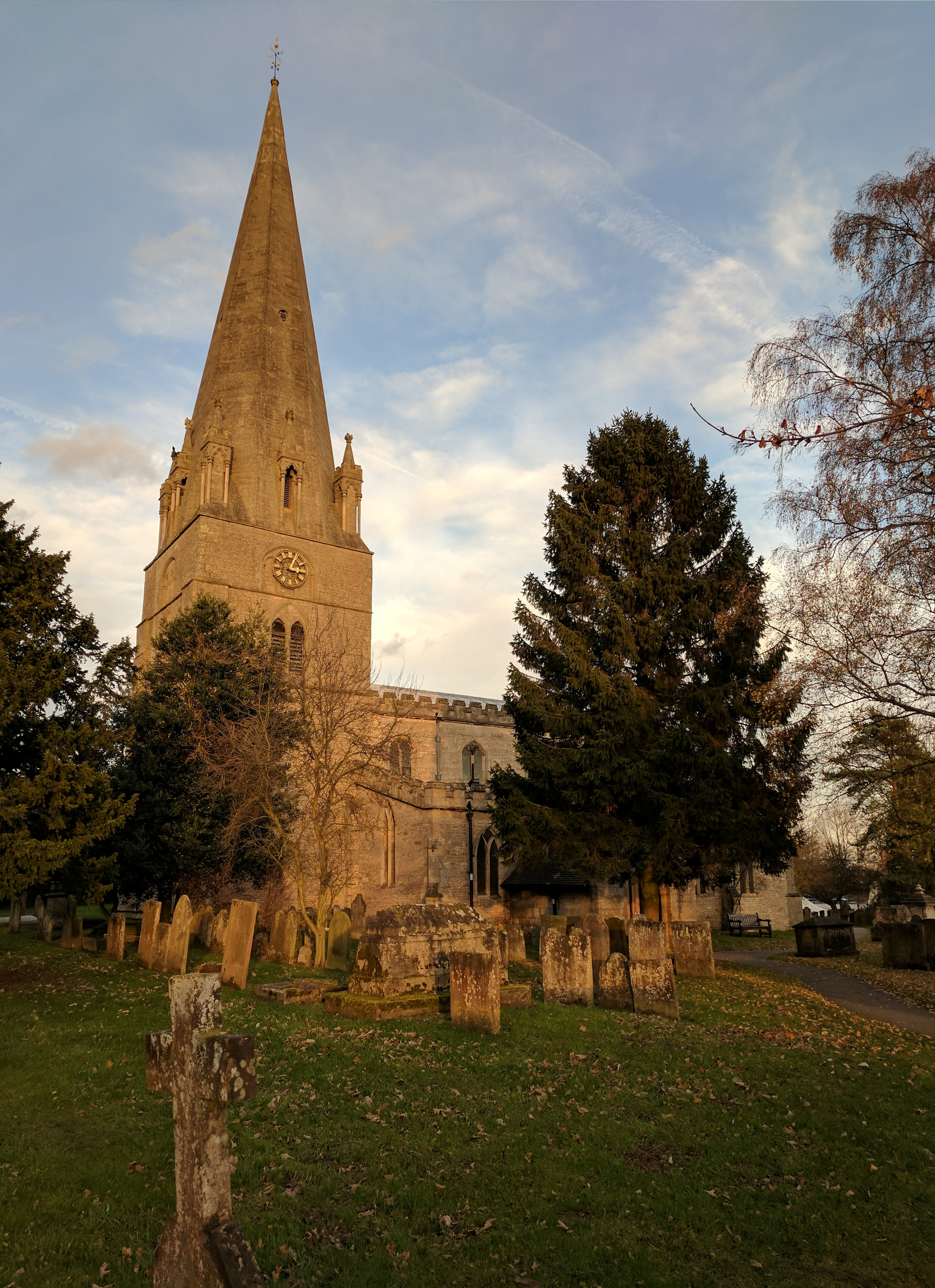
Exterior and churchyard

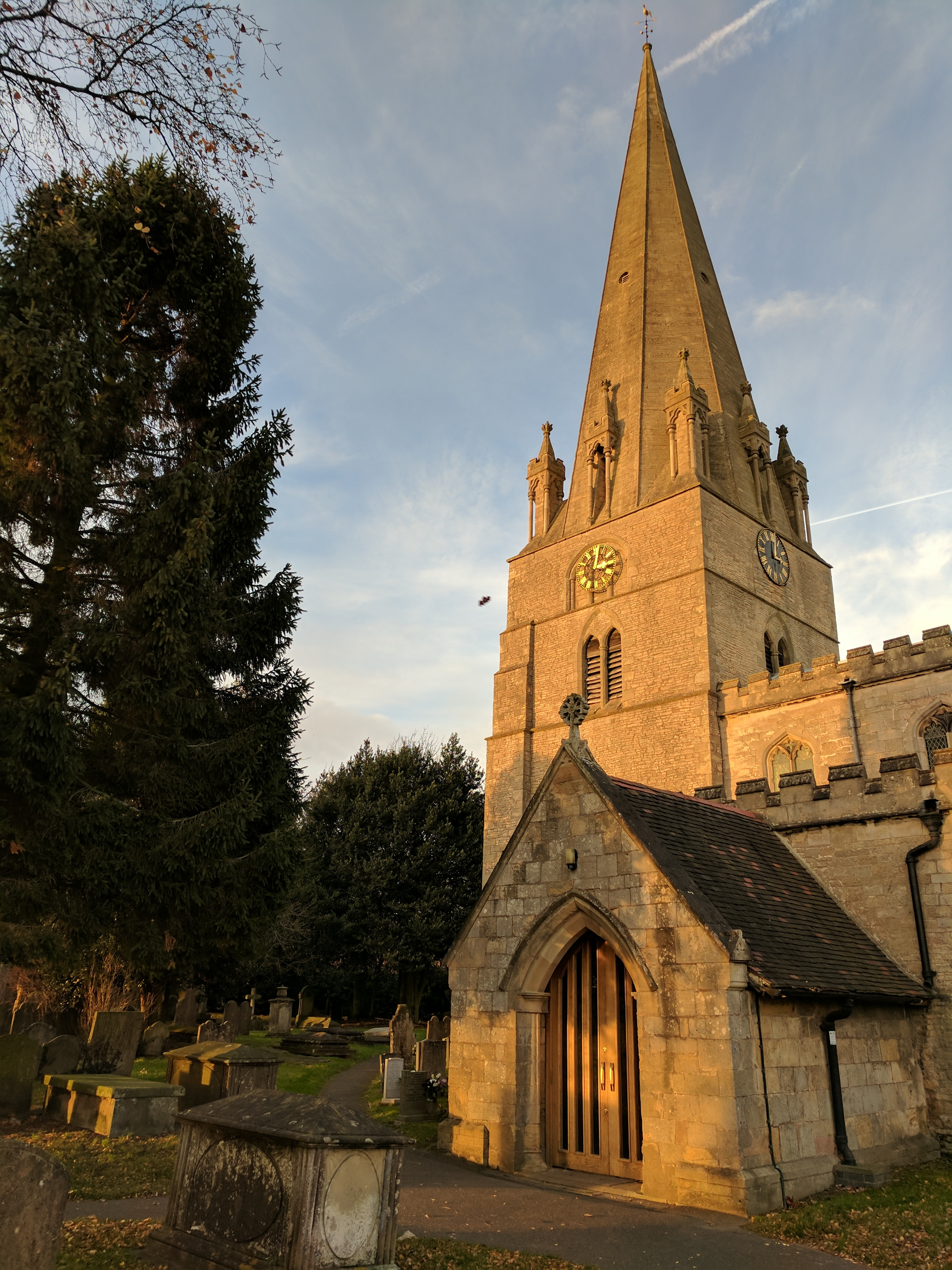
Exterior

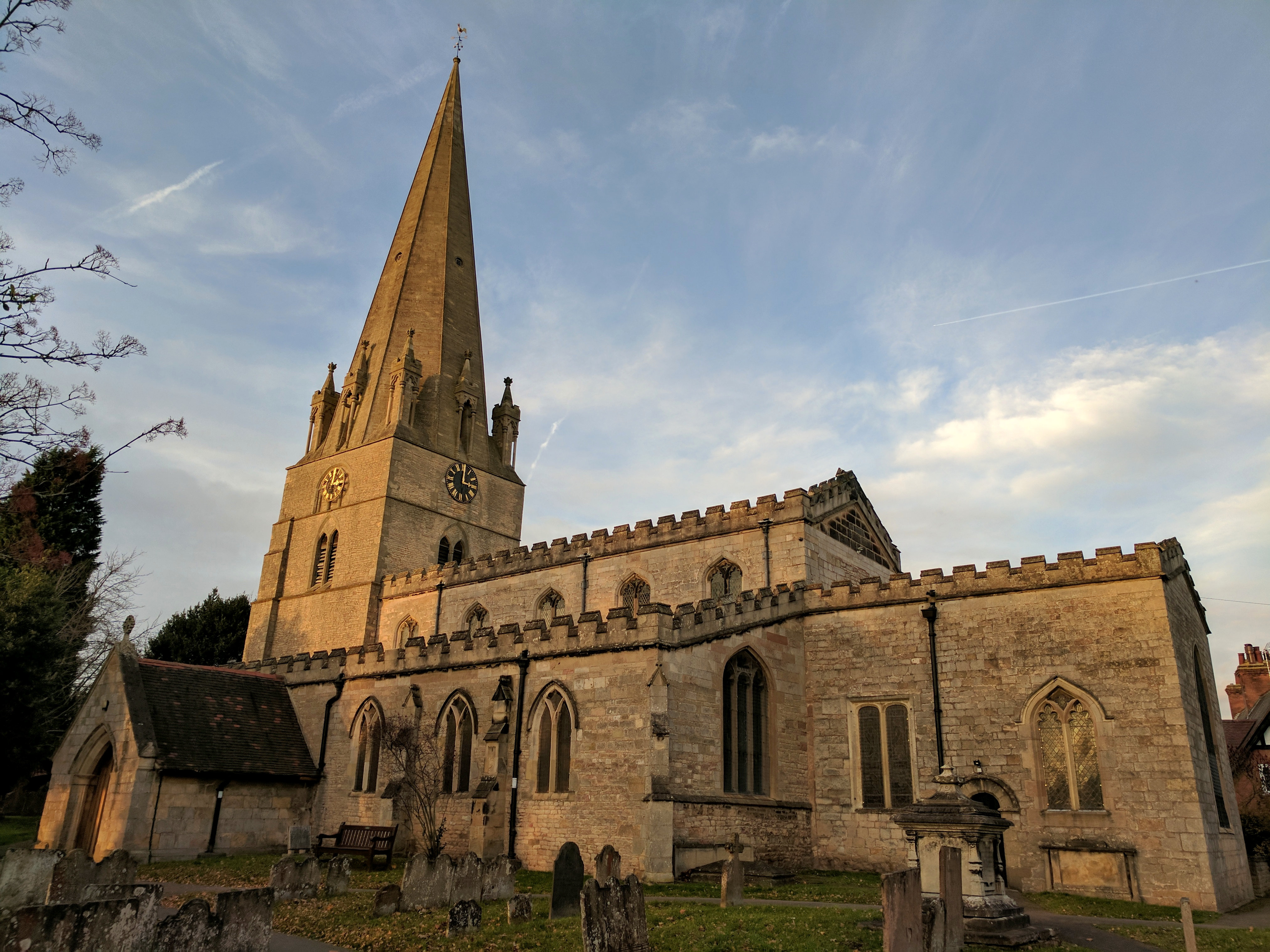
Exterior

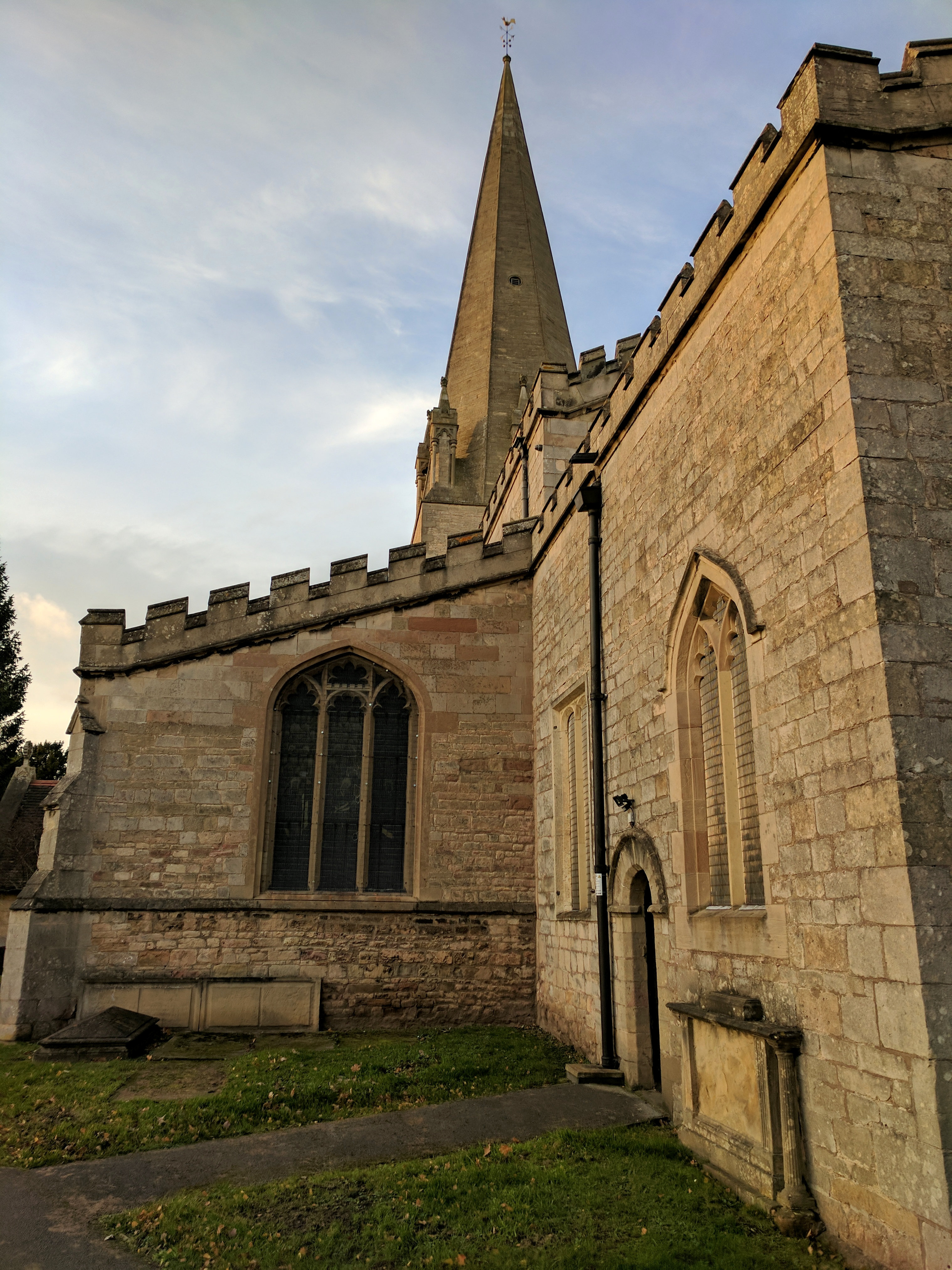
Exterior

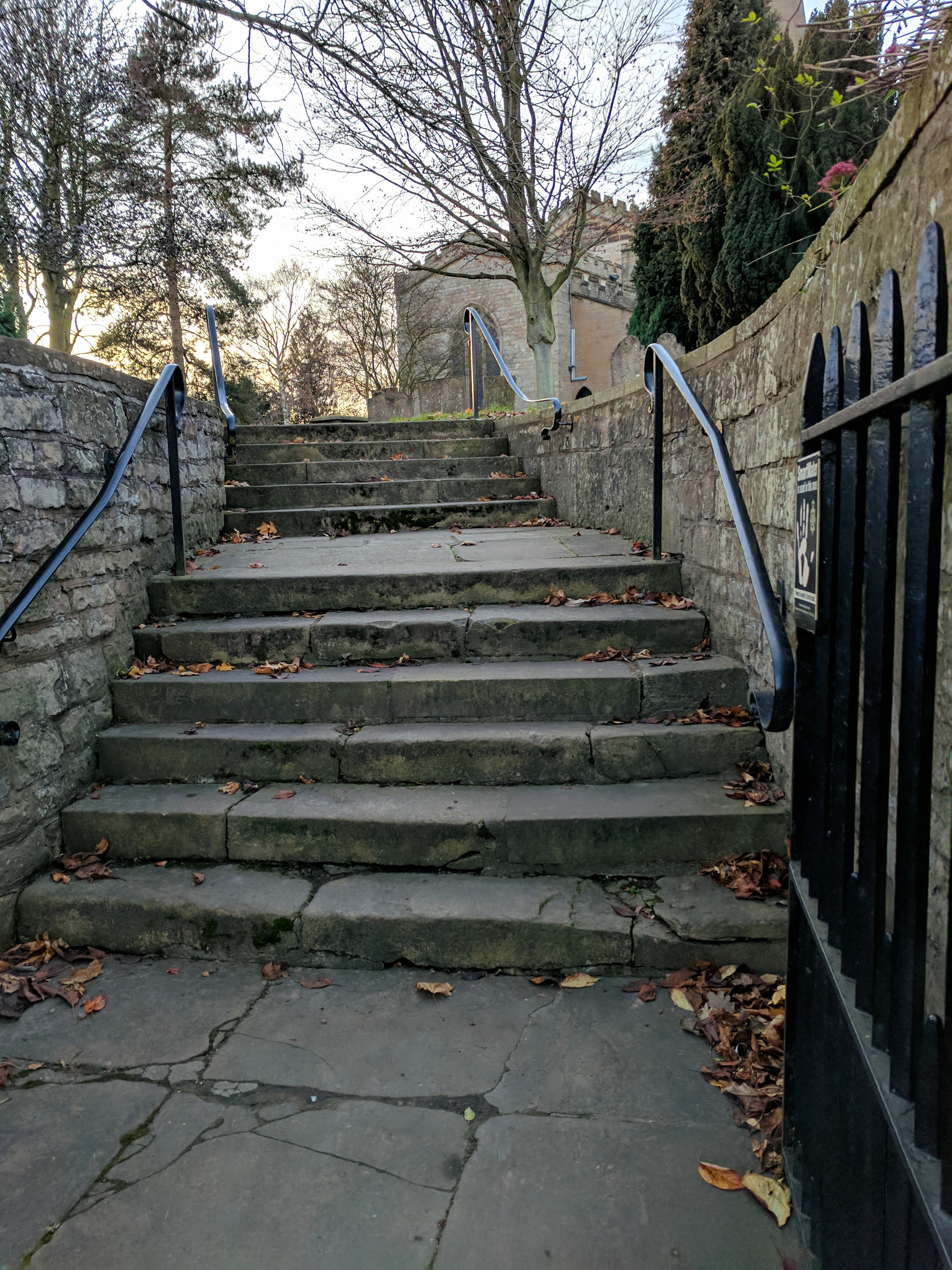
Boundary wall, gate, steps and overthrow

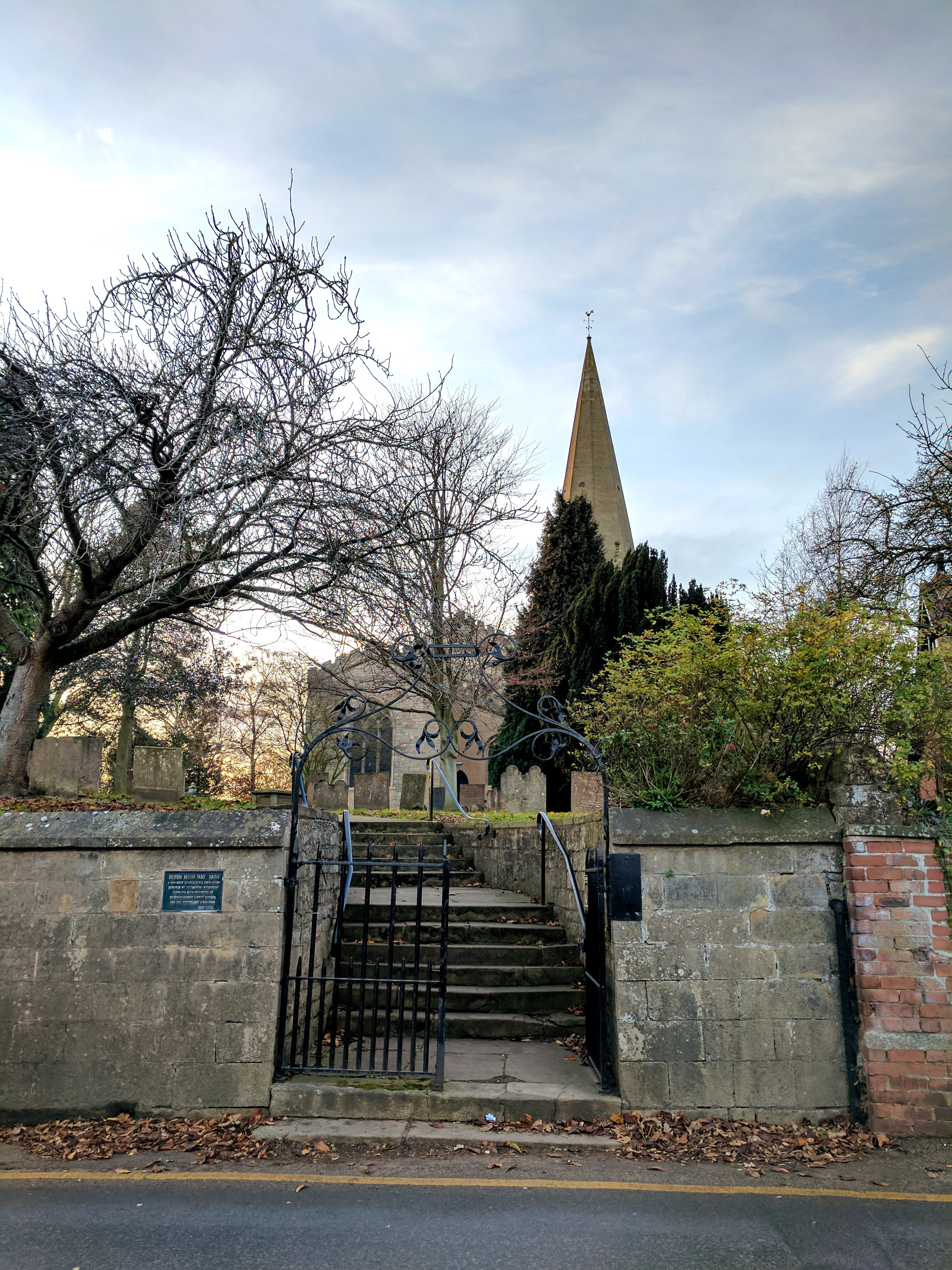
Boundary wall, gate, steps and overthrow

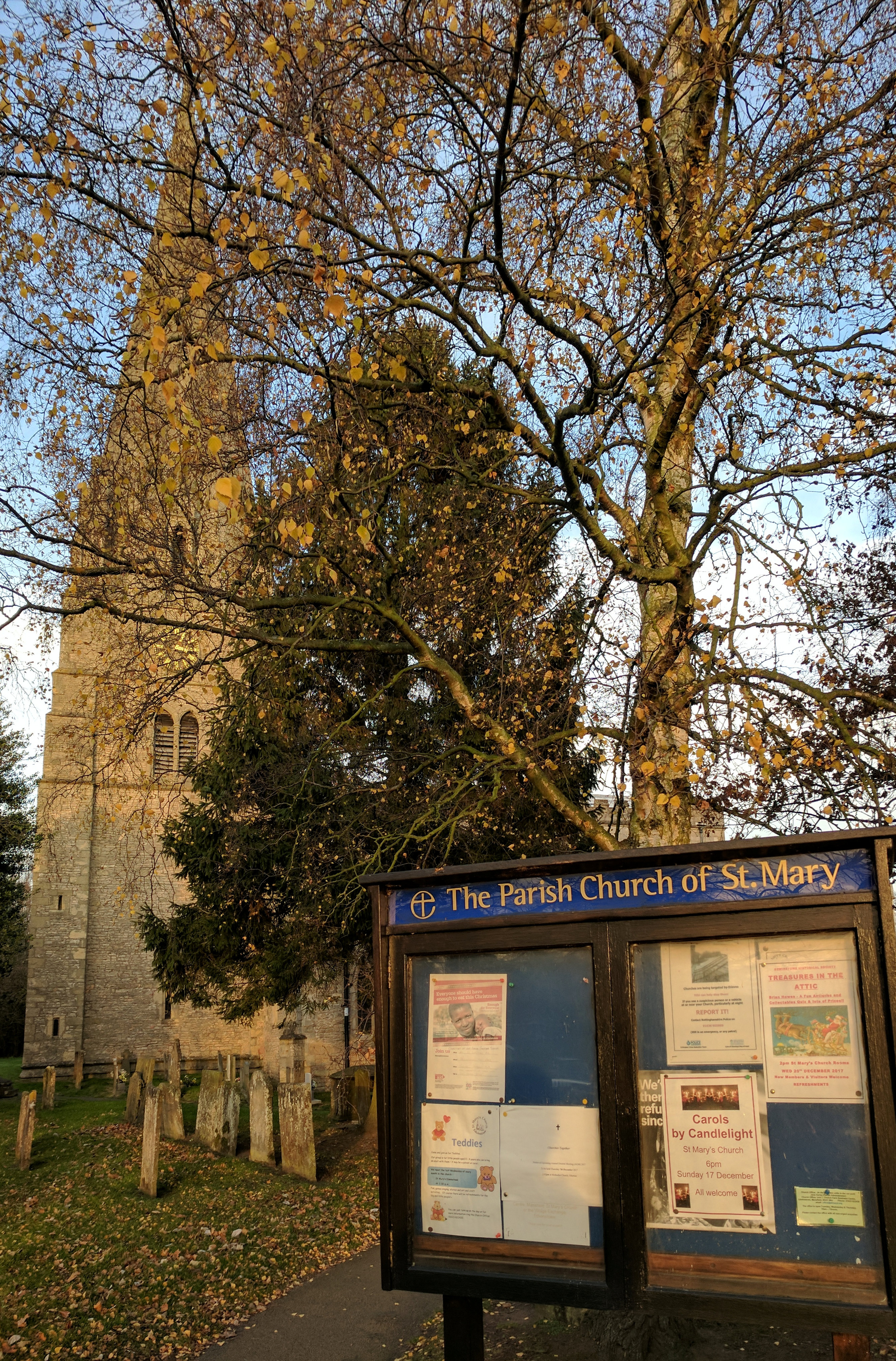
Notice board

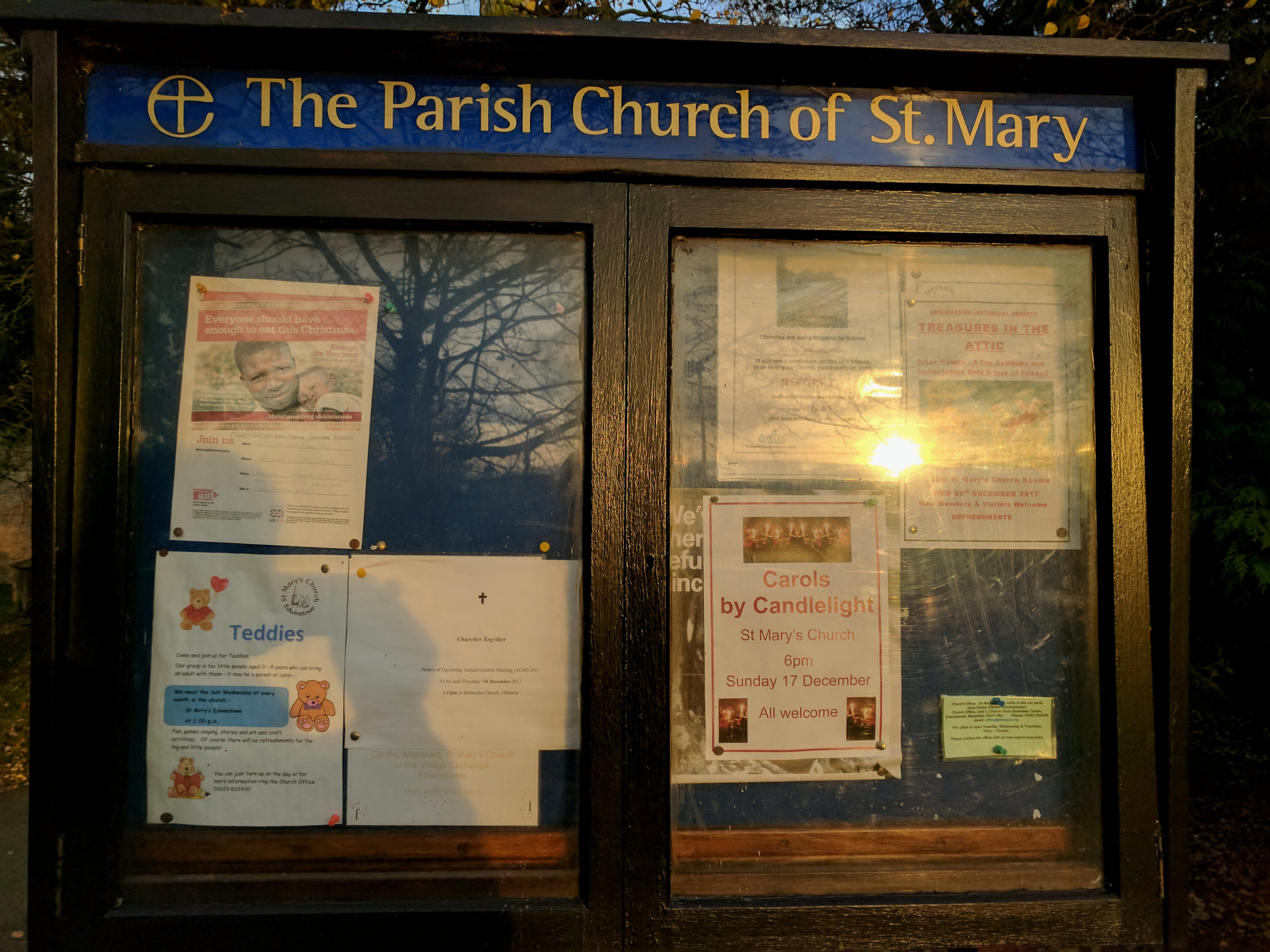
Notice board

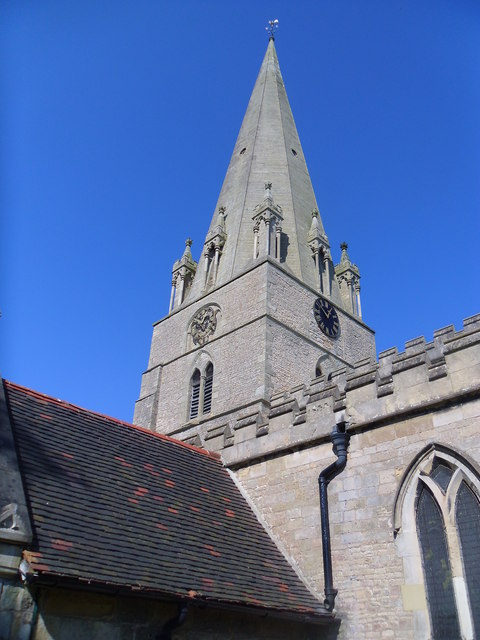
Tower and spire
