= Listed buildings in Edwinstowe =

Edwinstowe is a civil parish in the Newark and Sherwood district of Nottinghamshire, England. The parish contains seven listed buildings that are recorded in the National Heritage List for England. Of these, one is listed at Grade I, the highest of the three grades, and the others are at Grade II, the lowest grade. The parish contains the village of Edwinstowe and the surrounding countryside. The listed buildings consist of a church and associated structures, a former country house, a row of cottages, a monument, a farmhouse and a war memorial.

== Key ==
Grade	Criteria
I	Buildings of exceptional interest, sometimes considered to be internationally important
II	Buildings of national importance and special interest

== Buildings ==
Name and location	Photograph	Date	Notes	Grade
St Mary's Church; 53.19591°N 1.06562°W		12th century	The church has been altered and extended through the centuries. It is in stone with lead roofs, and consists of a nave with a clerestory, north and south aisles, a mausoleum to the north, a south porch, a chancel, a vestry and a west steeple. The steeple has a tower with three stages on a moulded plinth, with string courses, clasping buttresses, lancet bell openings, clock faces, and an octagonal broach spire with a finial and a weathercock. At the base of the spire are eight elaborate crocketed pinnacles, and along the body of the church are embattled parapets.	I
Edwinstowe Hall; 53.19667°N 1.06531°W		Early 18th century	A country house later used for other purposes, it is in colourwashed rendered brick, on a plinth, with stone dressings, floor bands, moulded eaves on scrolled brackets, a coped parapet, and a hipped slate roof. There are three storeys, five bays, and a two-storey three-bay wing on the left. In the centre of the main front is a porch with a scrolled architrave, a fanlight, a hood on scrolled brackets, and a pediment, and the windows are sashes. On the north front is a canted bay window with an ogee roof, and at the rear is a conservatory. In the wing is a round-headed doorway with a fanlight, and the upper floor contains a large sash window with a cast iron balcony.	II
1, 3 and 5 Church Street; 53.19526°N 1.06476°W		Early 19th century	A row of three cottages in stone that have a pantile roof with coped gables and kneelers. There are two storeys and four bays. The doorways and windows, which are casements with latticed glazing, have hood moulds.	II
Monument to a horse 53.20753°N 1.04439°W		1834	The monument to a horse, which also acts as a milestone, is in stone, and consists of a Doric column with a moulded base and capital. The ball finial is no longer present. The column stands on a square pedestal with a stepped base and a moulded top, on a square two-stepped plinth. On the south side is a recess formerly containing a bronze plate.	II
Carr Brecks Farmhouse; 53.19550°N 1.03398°W	—	c. 1840	The farmhouse is in brick, with a floor band and a hipped slate roof. There are two storeys, three bays, and a single-story service wing to the east. The central doorway has a fanlight and a hood, and the windows are sashes. The middle bay of the south front projects slightly, and is flanked by pilasters containing windows.	II
Wall, gate, steps and overthrow, St Mary's Church; 53.19563°N 1.06482°W		1844	At both of the entrances to the churchyard is a pair of wrought iron gates leading to steps, above each is an elaborate scrolled overthrow and a lamp bracket, and the flanking walls have gabled coping. The boundary wall of the churchyard has ramped dressed stone half-round coping. On the wall is an ogee-headed date panel.	II
War memorial 53.19506°N 1.06476°W		1920	The war memorial stands in a garden by a crossroads, and is in grey Cornish granite. It consists of a Celtic cross on a tapering shaft, on a two-stepped tapered plinth and a two-stepped base. On the front of the shaft is an inscription, and on the upper step of the plinth are the names of those lost in the First World War. On the lower step is an inscription and the names of those lost in the Second World War. Around the memorial is paving with a stone ball finial in each corner, and the garden is enclosed by a low stone wall.	II
