= Queering the Pitch =

1994 book about sexuality and race in music

- Author: Elizabeth Wood, Gary C. Thomas, Philip Brett
- Genre: Music
- Publisher: Routledge
- Publication date: 1993
- ISBN: 9780415907538

Queering The Pitch: The New Gay and Lesbian Musicology is a 1994 book edited by Philip Brett, Elizabeth Wood, and Gary C. Thomas. It was published in the United States by Routledge and focuses on the impact of factors such as sexuality or race has on a musician's music.

== Synopsis ==
The book's chapters examines how sexuality in the American Musicological Society (AMS) as well as the differences on how the musician's sexuality and the sexuality defines the musician's music along with gender, race, class and nationality.

== Reception ==
The book has received reviews from multiple outlets, which includes the Journal of the American Musicological Society, The Chronicle of Higher Education, Musicology Australia, and Notes.
