= Gary Tomlinson =

Gary Alfred Tomlinson (born December 4, 1951) is an American musicologist and Sterling Professor of Music and Humanities at Yale University. He was formerly the Annenberg Professor in the Humanities at the University of Pennsylvania. He graduated from the University of California, Berkeley, with a Ph.D., in 1979 with thesis titled Rinuccini, Peri, Monteverdi, and the humanist heritage of opera.

Tomlinson was Director of the Whitney Humanities Center, Yale University, from 2012 to 2020.

Tomlinson's research has ranged across diverse fields, including the history of opera, early-modern European musical thought and practice, the musical cultures of indigenous American societies, the philosophy of history and critical theory, and evolutionary humanities. In his research on music, culture, and human evolution, he is concerned to reshape the relations of evolutionary theory, archaeology, and humanistic theory so as to offer a novel model of the emergence of human modernity. This work has broadened in two recent books to consider the evolution of human culture in general and the scope of culture and meaning among nonhuman animals. The chief ingredients of his evolutionary humanities are the niche-construction theory of biologists' extended evolutionary synthesis, a conception of culture wide enough to embrace complex behaviors of many animals, and an extended semiotics indebted to Charles Sanders Peirce.

== Selected awards ==
- 1983–84 Guggenheim Fellowship
- 1988–93 MacArthur Fellows Program
- 2001 Elected to American Academy of Arts and Sciences
- 2010 British Academy, Derek Allen Prize
- 2016 Honorary membership, American Musicological Society

== Books ==
- The Machines of Evolution and the Scope of Meaning, Zone Books, 2023
- Culture and the Course of Human Evolution, University of Chicago Press, 2018
- A Million Years of Music: The Emergence of Human Modernity, Zone Books, 2015
- The singing of the New World: indigenous voice in the era of European contact, Cambridge University Press, 2007, ISBN 978-0-521-87391-8
- Music and Historical Critique: Selected Essays, Ashgate, 2007
- Metaphysical song: an essay on opera, Princeton University Press, 1999, ISBN 978-0-691-00409-9
- Music in renaissance magic: toward a historiography of others, University of Chicago Press, 1993
- Monteverdi and the end of the Renaissance, University of California Press, 1987
- (with Joseph Kerman) Listen, sixth edn., Bedford/St.Martin's, 2008
- Ed., Italian Secular Song, 1606–1636, 7 vols., Garland, 1987–88
- Ed., Strunk's Source readings in Music History, revised edition, The Renaissance, Norton, 1998

== Selected essays ==
- “Musical Meaning in Transspecies Perspective: A Semiotic Model,” in The Science-Music Borderlands (MIT Press 2023)
- “Cantologies,” with Michael Denning; Representations (2021)
- “Extending the Explanatory Scope of Evolutionary Theory: The Origin of Historical Kinds in Biology and Culture,” with Günter P. Wagner; PTPBio 2022
- “Posthumanism,” in The Oxford Handbook of Western Music and Philosophy (Oxford University Press 2021)
- "Two Deep-Historical Models of Climate Crisis," South Atlantic Quarterly 116 (2017)
- "Sound, Affect, and Musicking before the Human," boundary 2 43 (2016)
- "Evolutionary Studies in the Humanities: The Case of Music," Critical Inquiry 39 (2013)
- "Parahuman Wagnerism," The Opera Quarterly 29 (2013)
- "Il faut mediterraniser la musique: After Braudel," in Braudel Revisited: The Mediterranean World, 1600–1800 (University of Toronto Press, 2010)
- "Hamlet and Poppea: Musicking Benjamin's Trauerspiel," in The Opera Quarterly 25 (2009)
- "Monumental Musicology," review essay of Richard Taruskin, The Oxford History of Western Music, in Journal of the Royal Musical Association 132 (2007)
- "Musicology, Anthropology, History," in The Cultural Study of Music (Rutledge, 2003, 2011)
- "Vico's Songs: Detours at the Origins of Ethnomusicology," in The Musical Quarterly 83 (1999)
- "Ideologies of Aztec Song," in Journal of the American Musicological Society 48 (1995)
- "Musical Pasts and Postmodern Musicologies: A Response to Lawrence Kramer," in Current Musicology 53 (1993)
- "Cultural Dialogics and Jazz: A White Historian Signifies," in Black Music Research Journal 11 (1991)
- "Italian Romanticism and Italian Opera: An Essay in Their Affinities," in 19th-Century Music 9 (1986)
- "The Web of Culture: A Context for Musicology," in 19th-Century Music 7 (1984)
- "Madrigal, Monody, and Monteverdi's via naturale alla immitatione," Journal of the American Musicological Society 34 (1981)
