= New musicology =

Subset of musicology since the 1980s

New musicology is a wide body of musicology since the 1980s with a focus upon the cultural study, aesthetics, criticism, and hermeneutics of music. It began in part a reaction against the traditional positivist musicology—focused on primary research—of the early 20th century and postwar era. Many of the procedures of new musicology are considered standard, although the name more often refers to the historical turn rather than to any single set of ideas or principles. Indeed, although it was notably influenced by feminism, gender studies, queer theory, postcolonial studies, and critical theory, new musicology has primarily been characterized by a wide-ranging eclecticism.

== Definitions and history ==
New musicology seeks to question the research methods of traditional musicology by displacing positivism, working in partnership with outside disciplines, including the humanities and social sciences, and by questioning accepted musical knowledge. New musicologists seek ways to employ anthropology, sociology, cultural studies, gender studies, feminism, history, and philosophy in the study of music.

In 1980 Joseph Kerman published the article "How We Got into Analysis, and How to Get Out", calling for a change in musicology. He asked for "a new breadth and flexibility in academic music criticism [musicology]", that would extend to musical discourse, critical theory and analysis. In the words of Rose Rosengard Subotnik: "For me...the notion of an intimate relationship between music and society functions not as a distant goal but as a starting point of great immediacy...the goal of which is to articulate something essential about why any particular music is the way it is in particular, that is, to achieve insight into the character of its identity."

Susan McClary suggests that new musicology defines music as "a medium that participates in social formation by influencing the ways we perceive our feelings, our bodies, our desires, our very subjectivities—even if it does so surreptitiously, without most of us knowing how". For Lawrence Kramer, music has meanings "definite enough to support critical interpretations comparable in depth, exactness, and density of connection to interpretations of literary texts and cultural practices".

New musicology combines cultural studies with the analysis and criticism of music, and it accords more weight to the sociology of musicians and institutions and to non-canonical genres of music, including jazz and popular music, than traditional musicology did. (A similar perspective became common for American ethnomusicologists during the 1950s.) This has caused many musicologists to question previously held views of authenticity and to make assessments based on critical methods "concerned with finding some kind of synthesis between [musical] analysis and a consideration of social meaning".

New musicologists question the processes of canonization. Gary Tomlinson suggests that meaning be searched out in a "series of interrelated historical narratives that surround the musical subject" – a "web of culture" For example, the work of Beethoven has been examined from new perspectives by studying his reception and influence in terms of hegemonic masculinity, the development of the modern concert, and the politics of his era, among other concerns. The traditional contrast between Beethoven and Schubert has been revised in the light of these studies, especially with reference to Schubert's possible homosexuality.

== Relationship to music sociology ==
New musicology is distinct from German music sociology in the work of Adorno, Max Weber and Ernst Bloch. Although some new musicologists claim some allegiance to Adorno, their work has little in common with the wider field of Adorno studies, especially in Germany. New musicologists frequently exhibit strong resistance to German intellectual traditions, especially in regard to nineteenth-century German music theorists including Adolf Bernhard Marx and Eduard Hanslick, and also the twentieth-century figures Heinrich Schenker and Carl Dahlhaus.

A fundamental distinction has to do with attitudes towards modernism and popular culture. Influential, oft-cited essays such as McClary (1989) and McClary (2006) are highly dismissive of modernist music. German music sociologists tend to be more favorable towards modernism (though by no means uncritically) and severely critical of popular music as inextricably tied to the aesthetics of distraction as demanded by the culture industry. Heinz-Klaus Metzger describes "a fascistic element" in the music of The Rolling Stones. New musicology, on the other hand, often overlaps with postmodern aesthetics; various new musicologists are highly sympathetic towards musical minimalism.

== Criticism ==
Vincent Duckles writes, "As musicology has grown more pluralistic, its practitioners have increasingly adopted methods and theories deemed by observers to mark the academy as irrelevant, out of touch with 'mainstream values', unwelcoming of Western canonic traditions or simply incomprehensible. Paradoxically, such approaches have distanced music scholarship from a broad public at the very moment they have encouraged scholars to scrutinize the popular musics that form the backbone of modern mass musical culture."

Critics of new musicology include Pieter van den Toorn and to a lesser extent Charles Rosen. In response to an early essay of McClary, Rosen says that "she sets up, like so many of the 'new musicologists', a straw man to knock down, the dogma that music has no meaning, and no political or social significance. (I doubt that anyone, except perhaps the nineteenth-century critic Hanslick, has ever really believed that, although some musicians have been goaded into proclaiming it by the sillier interpretations of music with which we are often assailed.)" For David Beard and Kenneth Gloag, however, writing at two later moments, the methods of new musicology have been fully incorporated into mainstream musicological practice.
