= Lawrence Kramer (musicologist) =

American musicologist and composer (born 1946)

Academic work
- Discipline: Musicologist
- Sub-discipline: New Musicology
- Institutions: Fordham University

Lawrence Kramer (born 1946) is an American musicologist and composer. His academic work is closely associated with the humanistic, culturally oriented New Musicology, now more often referred to as cultural or critical musicology. Writing in 2001, Alastair Williams described Kramer as a pioneering figure in the disciplinary change that brought musicology, formerly an outlier, into the broader fold of the humanities.

== Biography ==
Kramer was born in Philadelphia and educated at the University of Pennsylvania and Yale. After several years on the English faculty at the University of Pennsylvania, he moved to Fordham University in New York City where he has taught since 1978 and now holds the position of Distinguished Professor of English and Music. He is the author of sixteen books on music and over a hundred and fifty articles or chapters. Between 1993 and 2025 he was the editor of the journal 19th-Century Music. He has held ten visiting professorships in North America, Europe, and China. His work has been translated into ten languages.

== New musicology ==
New and/or Critical musicology rejected the idea of the autonomous musical artwork and sought to understand music in terms of its social and cultural relationships. Controversial when introduced in the late 1980s, this position has since become foundational, while expanding further to include questions of affect, embodiment, and performance. It has also expanded beyond Western classical music, the main focus of Kramer’s work, to include music in any genre.

Kramer’s Music as Cultural Practice (1990) set forth the principle that music takes on complex meanings as a result of its participation in the circulation of valuations and practices that constitute culture. The book introduced a number of terms, including its title phrase, which passed into common use, most prominently “hermeneutic windows” (pressure points in and around music from which multiple lines of cultural associations extend). Between this book and The Thought of Music (2016; part of a trilogy also including Expression and Truth (2012) and Interpreting Music (2010), Kramer expanded his theoretical frame of reference to include performance, embodiment, voice, music in media (especially film), and opera. He has challenged the idea that musical meaning must be derived from musical form and has repeatedly rejected oppositions between score and performance and performance and meaning. He has drawn on speech act theory, deconstruction, Lacanian psychoanalysis, and philosophy, especially by Heidegger and Wittgenstein, to develop a pragmatic theory of interpretation, “descriptive realism,” which asserts that interpretation is a form of knowledge, not merely opinion, first as applied to music and then applied in general. This in turn became the basis of a wider theory of humanistic knowledge that embraces uncertainty and creativity and takes musical experience as its paradigm.

In The Hum of the World: A Philosophy of Listening (2019) and Experiencing Sound: The Sensation of Being (2024), Kramer extended this theory to the experience of sound and the relationship of listening to knowledge.

== Hermeneutics ==
David Beard and Kenneth Gloag credit Kramer with bringing questions about hermeneutic models and processes—questions of meaning—to the forefront of musicology. In this respect they follow Grove Music Online, which credited Kramer with being the first English-language scholar to give musical hermeneutics a firm theoretical basis and a practical means of proceeding. This approach to musical meaning encompasses music with texts as well as instrumental music. According to Steven Paul Scher, writing in 1999, Kramer's development of new critical languages was preeminent in advancing the study of text-music relations. David Gramit similarly credited Kramer with remapping the intersection of literary theory and music and demystifying aesthetic experience while also upholding its value.

== Compositions ==
Kramer's compositions, including eleven string quartets, twenty song cycles, and numerous standalone songs, have been widely performed in the United States and Europe in venues including New York, Santa Fe, Edinburgh, London, Vienna, Stockholm, Graz, Ghent, and Bern. In 2013, his string quartet movement "Clouds, Wind, Stars" won the Composers Concordance “Generations” award. Kramer's compositions include:

- "Colors of Memory" for piano.
- "Evocations" for piano and optional voice.
- "Three Nocturnes" for viola and piano.
- "Questions of Travel" for cello and piano.
- "Cloud Shadows" for violin and piano.
- "A Short History" (of the Twentieth Century)" for voice and percussion.
- "The Wind Shifts" for voice and piano.
- "Pulsation" for piano quartet.
- "Wingspan" for string sextet.
- "The Hourglass" for cello and harp.
- "Part Songs" for mixed chorus.
- "Ecospheres" for baritone and chamber ensemble

== Books ==
- Experiencing Sound: The Sensation of Being (University of California Press, 2024) ISBN 9780520400849
- Music and the Forms of Life (University of California Press, 2022) ISBN 9780520389113
- The Hum of the World: A Philosophy of Listening (University of California Press, 2019) ISBN 9780520303492
- The Thought of Music (University of California Press, 2016) ISBN 9780520288805
- Expression and Truth: On the Music of Knowledge (University of California Press, 2012). ISBN 9780520273962
- Interpreting Music (University of California Press, 2011). ISBN 9780520267053
- Why Classical Music Still Matters (University of California Press, 2007). ISBN 9780520258037
- Critical Musicology and the Responsibility of Response: Selected Essays, Ashgate Contemporary Thinkers on Critical Musicology (Ashgate, 2006). ISBN 9780754626640
- Opera and Modern Culture: Wagner and Strauss (University of California Press, 2004). ISBN 9780520241732
- Musical Meaning: Toward a Critical History (University of California Press, 2002). ISBN 9780520228245
- Franz Schubert: Sexuality, Subjectivity, Song (Cambridge University Press, 1998). ISBN 9780521542166
- After the Lovedeath: Sexual Violence and the Making of Culture (University of California Press, 1997). ISBN 9780520224896
- Classical Music and Postmodern Knowledge (University of California Press, 1995). ISBN 9780520207004
- Music as Cultural Practice: 1800-1900 (University of California Press, 1993). ISBN 9780520084438
- Music and Poetry: The Nineteenth Century and After (University of California Press, 1984). ISBN 9780520048737
