= Birklands and Bilhaugh =

Protected area in Nottinghamshire, England

- Site of Special Scientific Interest
- Location within Nottinghamshire
- Location of Birklands and Bilhaugh.
- Area of search: Nottinghamshire
- Grid reference: SK620683
- Coordinates: 53.208160°N 1.0731511°W
- Area: 1,370.47 acres (5.546 km^{2}; 2.141 sq mi)
- Notification date: 1983

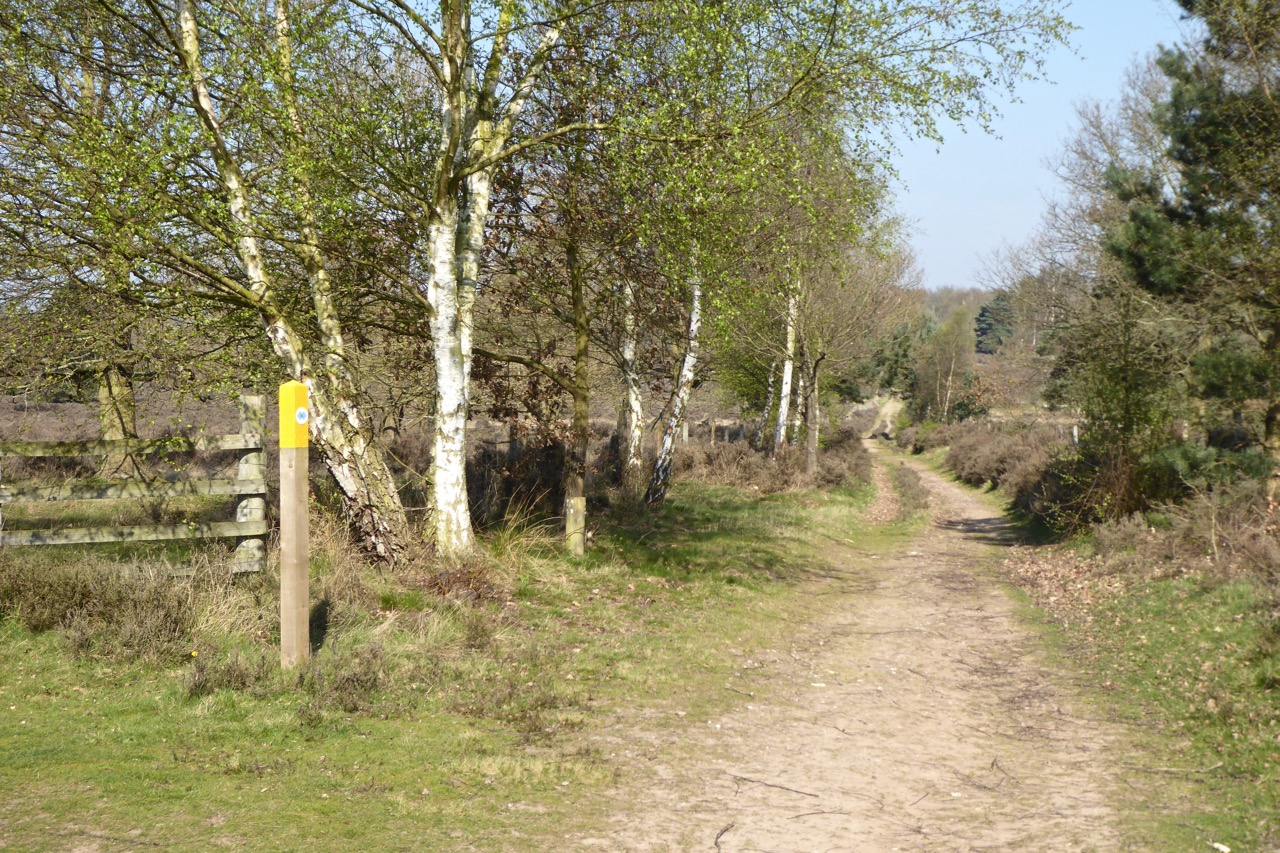
Budby South Forest

Birklands and Bilhaugh is a Site of Special Scientific Interest (SSSI) in Nottinghamshire, England. It is located to the west of the town of Ollerton. Birklands and Bilhaugh is regarded as a fragment of the ancient Sherwood Forest. The protected area includes Budby South Forest, managed by the Royal Society for the Protection of Birds.

The section of Birklands and Bilhaugh SSSI west of Swinecote Road is designated as Sherwood Forest National Nature Reserve.

== Details ==
Birklands and Bilhaugh is important because of the extent of deciduous woodland of oak and birch, and the protected area has an exceptional diversity of invertebrate species associated with old trees and dead wood. There is an exceptional population of ancient standing oaks. Budby South Forest contains areas of heathland and invertebrates present include ashy mining bees, black oil beetles, ruby tailed wasps and the butterfly called the purple emperor. Nightjars are also present.

The protected area contains the oak tree known as the Major Oak.

== Land ownership ==
Two major institutions that own land in Birklands and Bilhaugh SSSI are the Royal Society for the Protection of Birds (west of Swinecote Road) and the Ministry of Defence (east of Swinecote Road).
