= Robin Hood's Larder =

Tree in Sherwood Forest, England

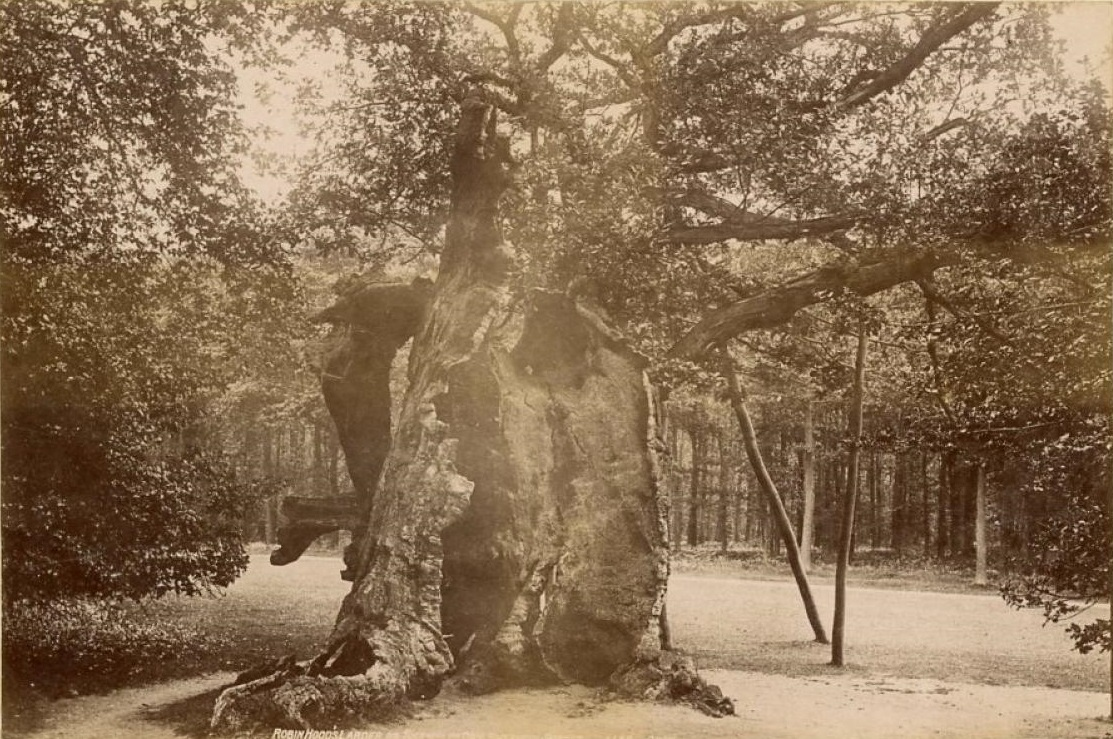
- Robin Hood's Larder shown on a Valentines of Dundee postcard from c.1906 but from a photographic negative of c.1895
- Interactive map of Robin Hood's Larder
- Location: Sherwood Forest, Nottinghamshire
- Date felled: 1961 (during a gale)
- Custodian: Land now owned by the Forestry Commission

Robin Hood's Larder (also known as the Butcher's Oak, the Slaughter Tree and the Shambles Oak) was a veteran tree in Sherwood Forest that measured 24 feet (7.3 m) in circumference. The tree had long been hollow and is reputed to have been used by the legendary outlaw Robin Hood and others as a larder for poached meat. It was badly burnt by fire in the late 19th century and again in 1913. The tree fell in a gale in 1961 and no trace of it remains.

== Location ==
The oak tree was located in Birklands, part of Sherwood Forest that was first mentioned in 1251 and in continual ownership by the crown for 600 years. It was situated approximately 3 miles (4.8 km) west of the village of Ollerton and 1.5 miles (2.4 km) west of the Major Oak. The site is under the ownership of the Forestry Commission and the Sherwood Forest Visitor Centre, previously run by Nottinghamshire County Council, succeeded by RSPB, is nearby.

== In legend ==
The tree's name derives from an association with the legendary figure of Robin Hood. It is reputed that Robin Hood used the hollow trunk of the tree as a temporary store for venison poached from the royal forest. The use of such trees for storing game was common in the times before refrigeration and regardless of the veracity of the Robin Hood legend it is likely that at some point the tree was used for this purpose by poachers. It is said that in earlier times hooks used for the hanging of meat could still be seen affixed to the inside of the tree; these had vanished by 1913. Because of this legend the tree has also been known as the Butcher's Oak, the Slaughter Tree and the Shambles Oak, the latter because it was the traditional name for an area of town where butchers and abattoirs were located.

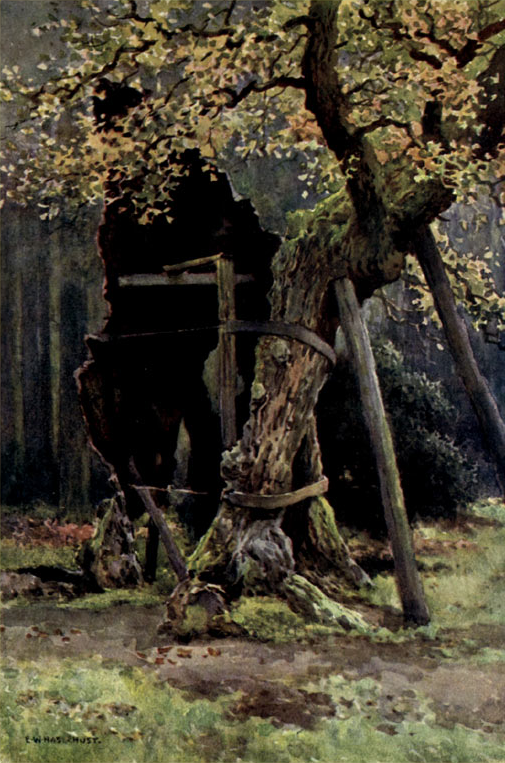
Robin Hood's Larder in a 1913 painting by Ernest William Haslehust

== History ==
An 1874 guidebook to the region mentions the tree and states that it was used formerly by a thief named Hooton to hang the carcasses of stolen sheep. At this point, the hollow trunk was big enough to accommodate 12 people. The tree was later reinforced with iron bars and cables. Towards the end of the 19th century the tree was badly burned in a fire originating from a group of schoolgirls boiling a kettle within the hollow. It was again damaged by a fire set by picnickers in 1913. In the same year, it was mentioned in a book of Robert Murray Gilchrist who described the tree as "an old, old man who will be brave to the end". Gilchrist noted the foliage was scanty but the tree retained live upper branches until after 1938. In 1938, the trunk measured 24 feet (7.3 m) in circumference and the hollow accounted for approximately one quarter of this. Robin Hood's Larder fell by a gale in 1961 and no trace of it remains today.

== See also ==
- List of individual trees
