= Berry Hill, Mansfield =

Of an area in Mansfield in Nottinghamshire, England

Coordinates: 53°07′40″N 1°11′03″W

Berry Hill
- Suburb
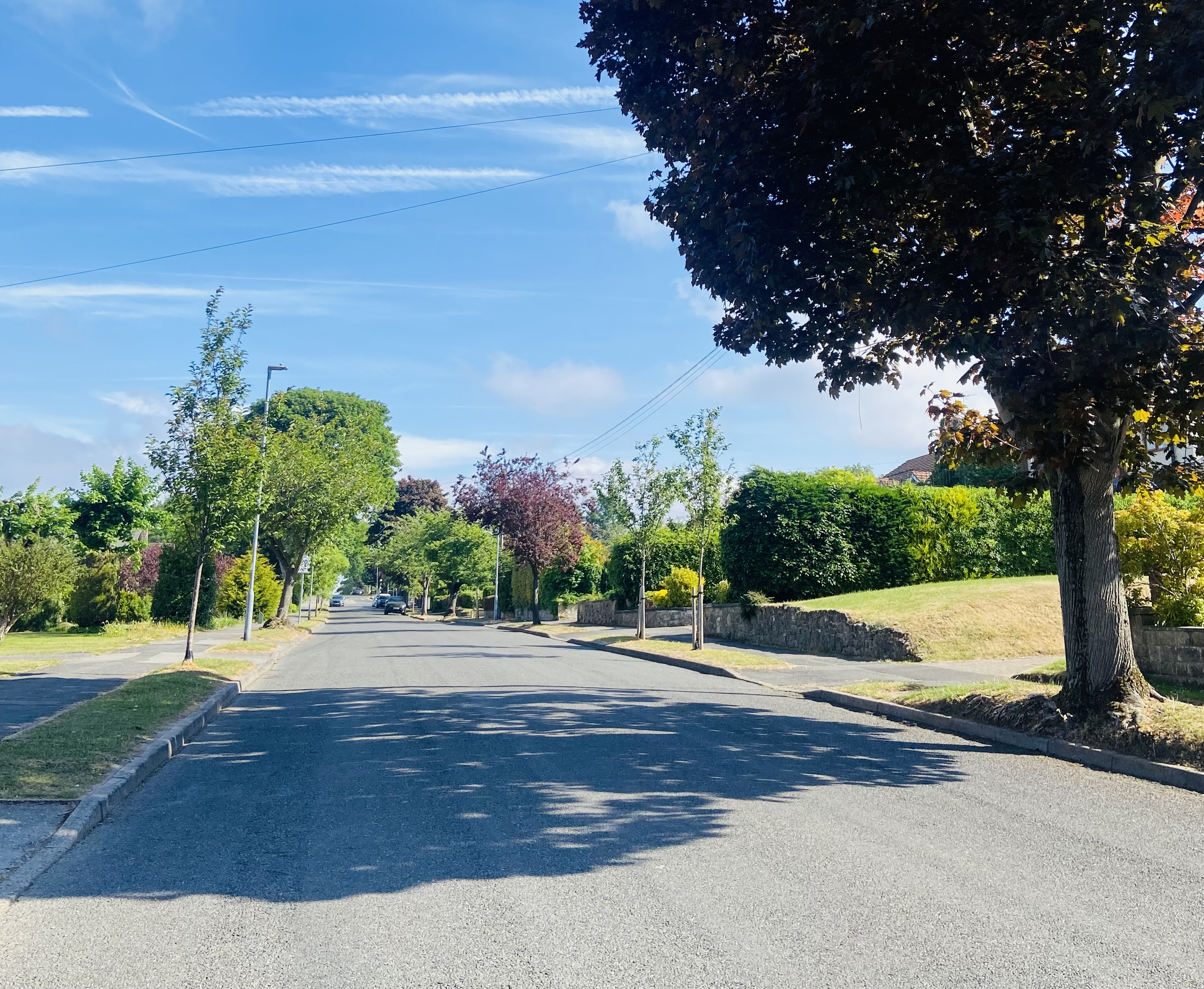
- Black Scotch Lane

- Location within Nottinghamshire
- Interactive map of Berry Hill
- District: Mansfield District
- Shire county: Nottinghamshire
- Region: East Midlands
- Country: England
- Sovereign state: United Kingdom
- Post town: MANSFIELD
- Postcode district: NG18
- Police: Nottinghamshire
- Fire: Nottinghamshire
- Ambulance: East Midlands
- UK Parliament: Mansfield

Berry Hill is a suburb within the town of Mansfield, Nottinghamshire, England with a local ward under Mansfield District Council using the same name. Berry Hill Open Air School, situated on Black Scotch Lane, in operation from 1931 to 1968, afterwards became a primary school.

The area is situated close to the A60 Nottingham Road on the south side of Mansfield.

The areas of Berry Hill, Oakham and Kings Walk are the more affluent parts of Mansfield with higher incomes. Within the district areas of Nottinghamshire (apart from Rushcliffe) but including Mansfield, Ashfield, Newark and Sherwood, Broxtowe and Bassetlaw, Berry Hill, Oakham and Kings Walk scored 2nd out of 20 areas. The average income was £51,700.

== History ==
Major Hayman Rooke, an antiquarian and former British soldier in the 18th Century identified a Roman camp at Berry Hill.

Berry Hill Hall, a grade II listed building, was originally a country house in Berry Hill built in the early 18th century. Additions were added to the hall in 1770 by William Bilbie. In 1924, the hall started to be used as a base for the physical rehabilitation of injured coal miners.

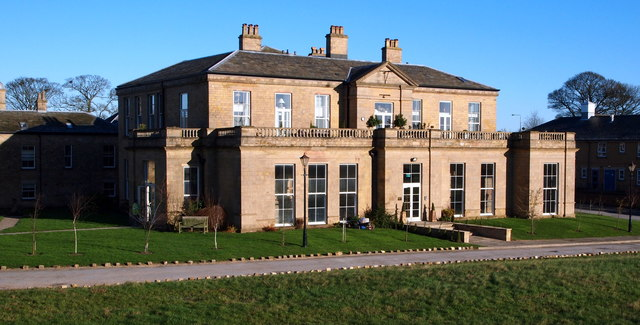
Berry Hill Hall

== Amenities ==
There are two parks within the Berry Hill area, Berry Hill Park and King George V Recreation Ground.

Berry Hill Park, a park which has been redeveloped as a destination park with improvements such as new and improved accessible paths, two new play areas, lake improvements, better car parking and a new building with a cafe, multi-functional space and toilets.

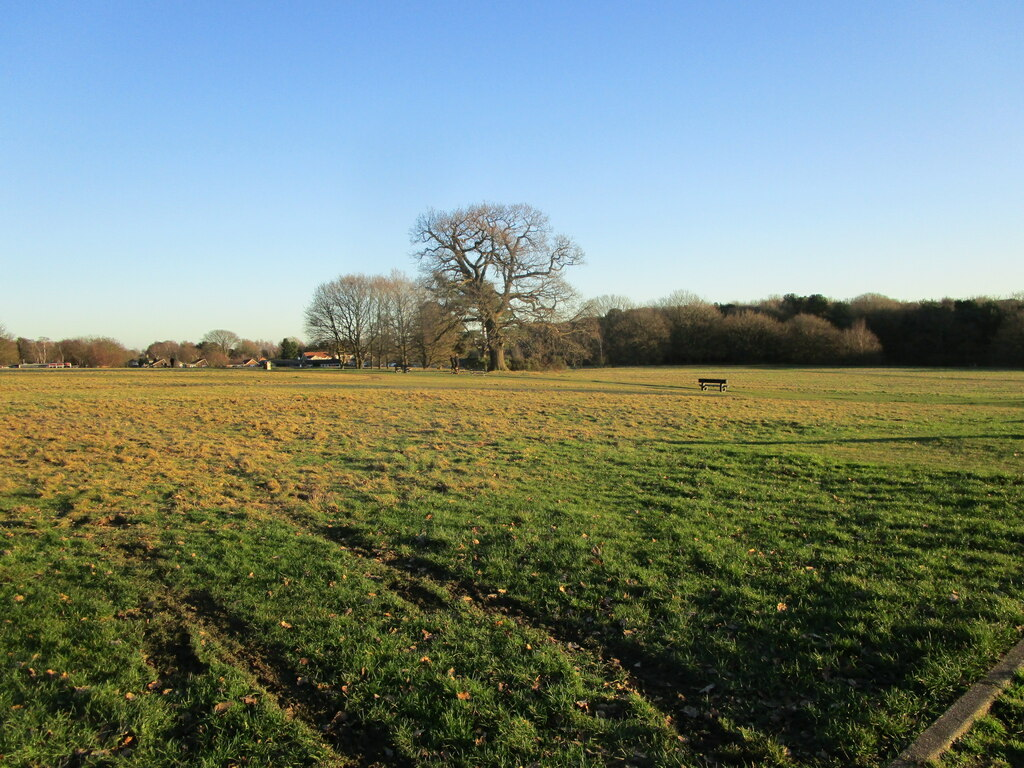
Berry Hill Park

Mansfield Harriers & A.C. is based at the track and field facilities within the park, first established in 1958 by the Coal Industry Social Welfare Organisation (CISWO) as part of their commitment to injury rehabilitation and social betterment of mining communities.

== Future developments ==
A significant number of new homes are to be built in Berry Hill including within the Lindhurst development, which is to include 1700 homes, a hotel, health centre, primary school, care home and offices.
