= Berry Hill Park =

Park in Mansfield, Nottinghamshire, England

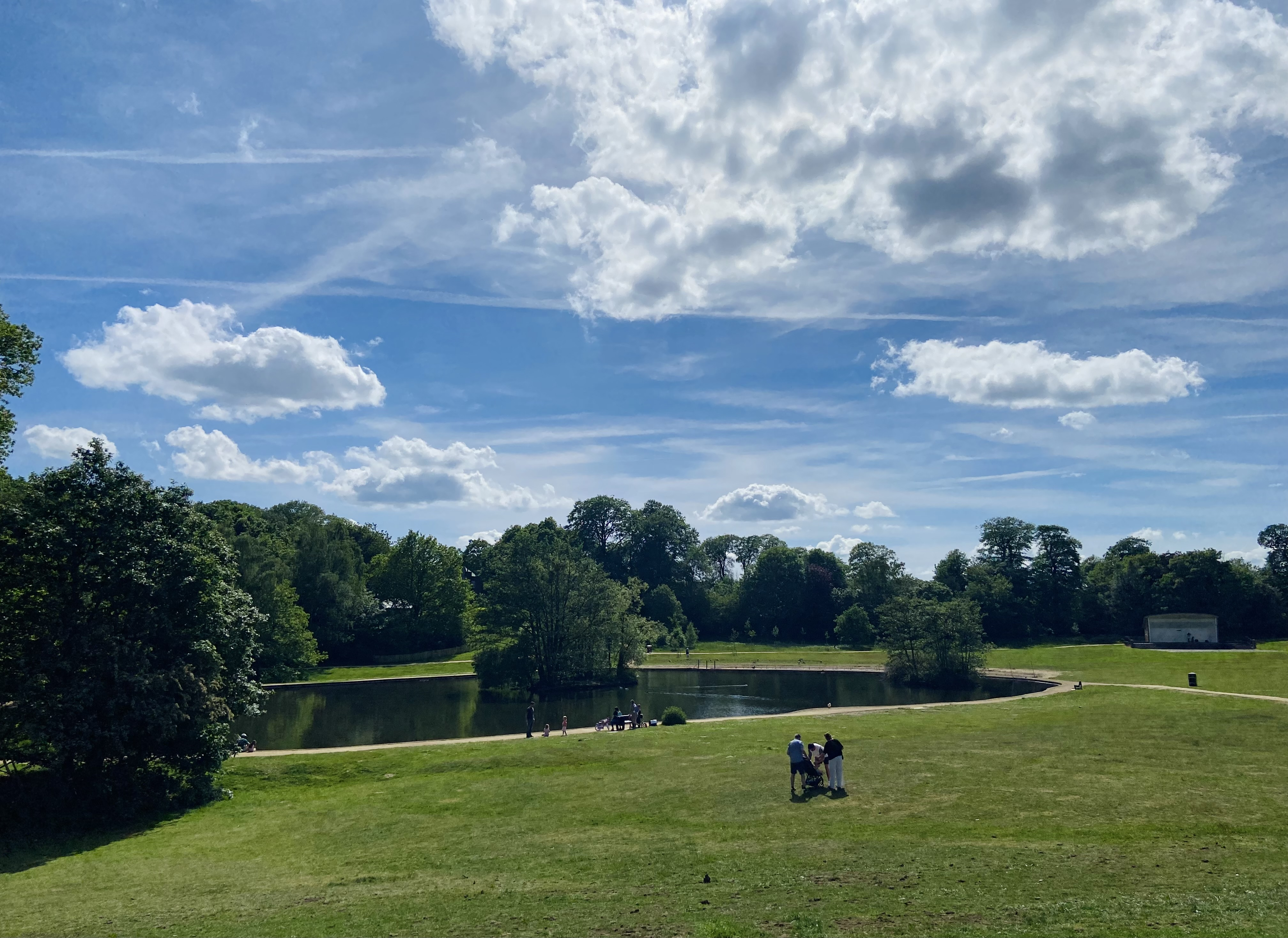
- The lake

- Location within Nottinghamshire
- Location: Lichfield Lane, Mansfield, NG18 4RP
- Coordinates: 53.128°N 1.18°W
- Opened: 1954
- Operator: Mansfield District Council
- Website: Berry Hill Park

Berry Hill Park is situated near Lichfield Lane in Berry Hill, a residential area of Mansfield, close to King George V Recreation Ground. The park is a destination park.

== History ==
The Bilbie family had Berry Hill Hall designed by an architect in 1730, the grounds (park) being part of the estate. The hall was developed into a convalescent home for coal miners and their families in 1925. In 1935 the grounds were opened to the public and the communities surrounding the area. The convalescent home (Berry Hill Hall) was sold and became a rehabilitation home for coal miners managed by the Minster for Health. The land was given to trustees to become Berry Hill Park in 1954.

== Park amenities ==
Berry Hill Park, a park which has been redeveloped as a destination park with improvements such as new and improved accessible paths, two new play areas, lake improvements, better car parking and a new building with a cafe, multi-functional space and toilets. The park has a bandstand, community orchard and woodland.

Mansfield Harriers & A.C. is based at the track and field facilities within the park, first established in 1958 by the Coal Industry Social Welfare Organisation (CISWO) as part of their commitment to injury rehabilitation and social betterment of mining communities.

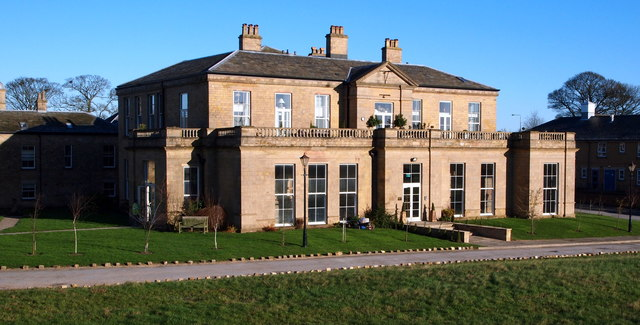
Berry Hill Hall

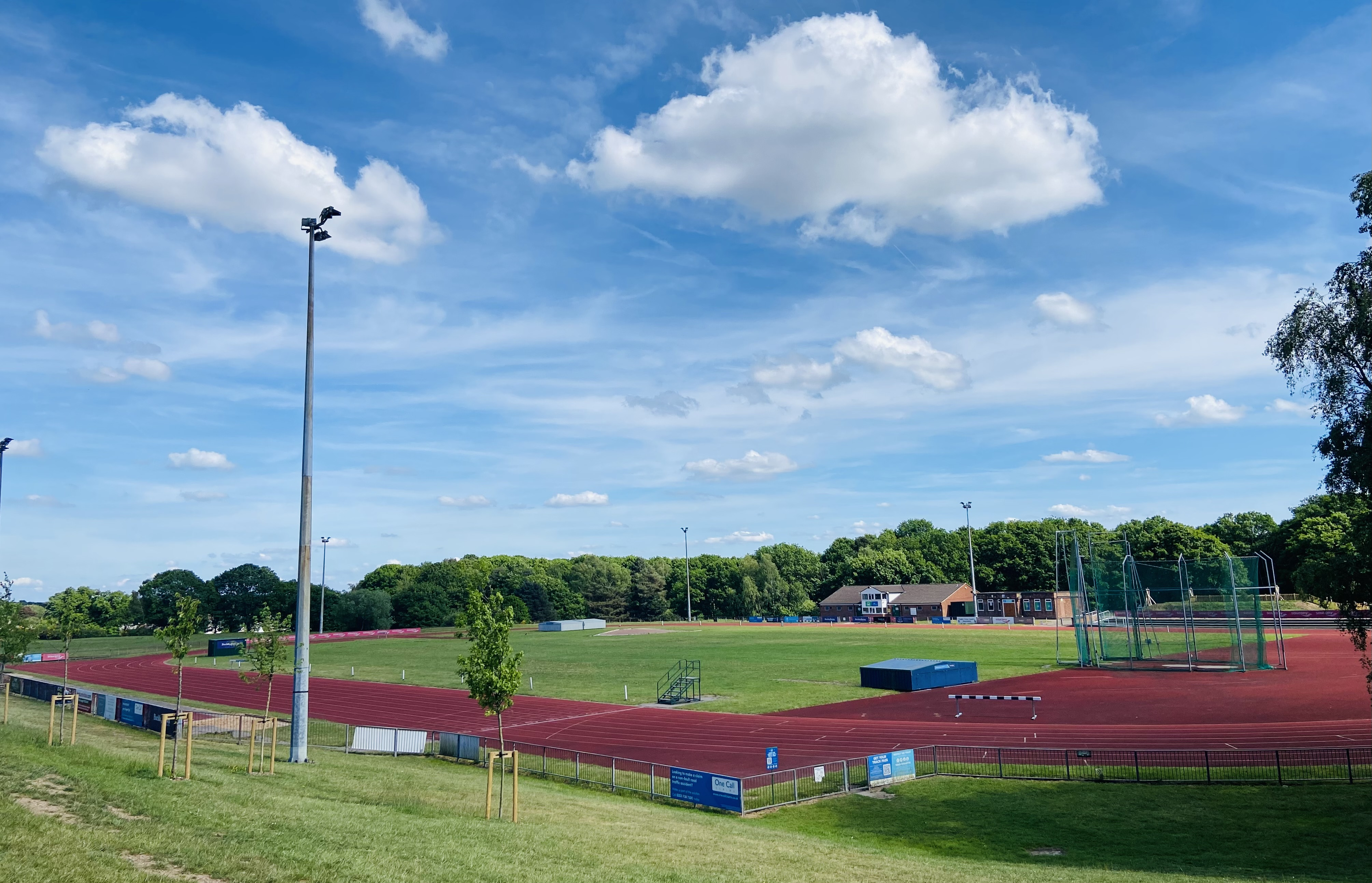
Athletics Track
