= Hayman Rooke =

English television presenter (born 1976)

Major Hayman Rooke
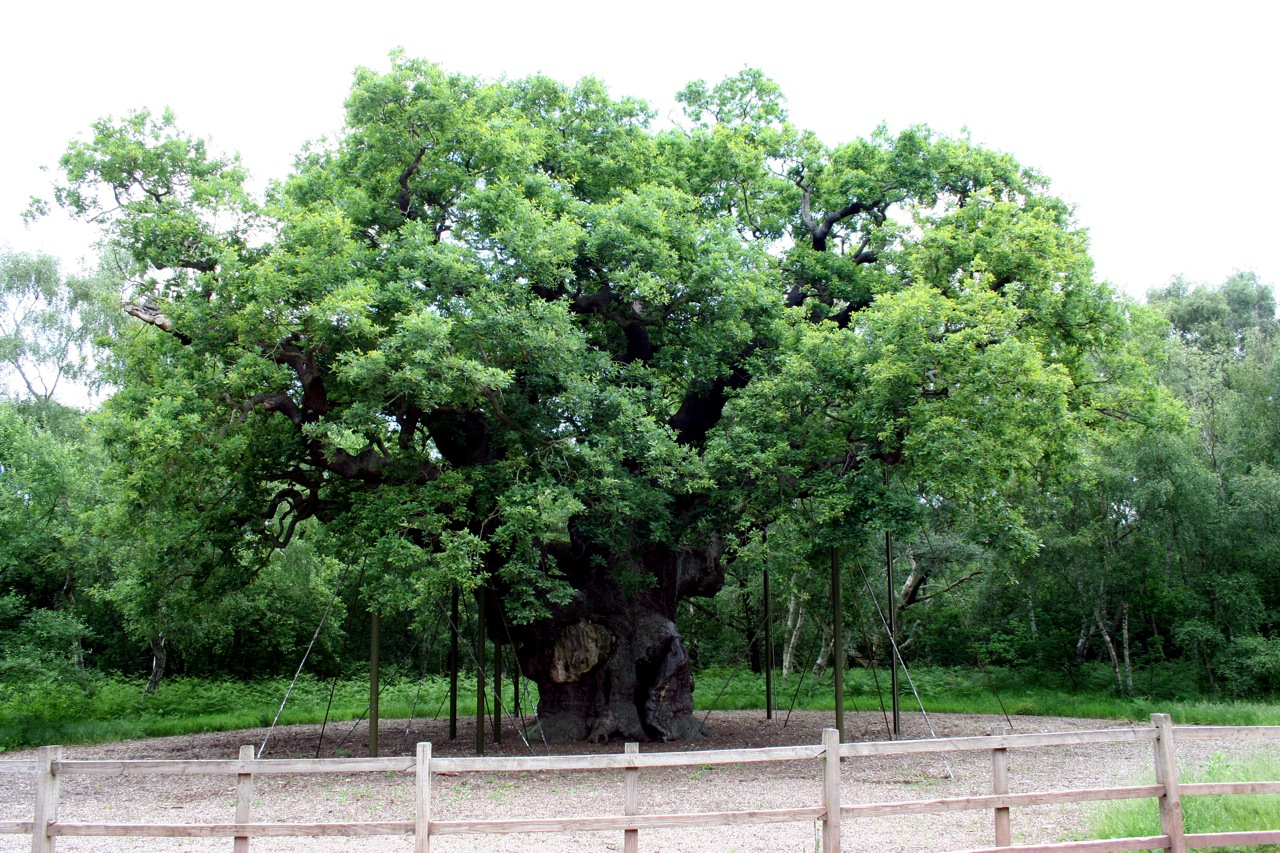
- Major Oak
- Born: 20 February 1723; City of Westminster, England
- Died: 18 September 1806 (aged 83)
- Occupations: Former British Soldier and Antiquarian

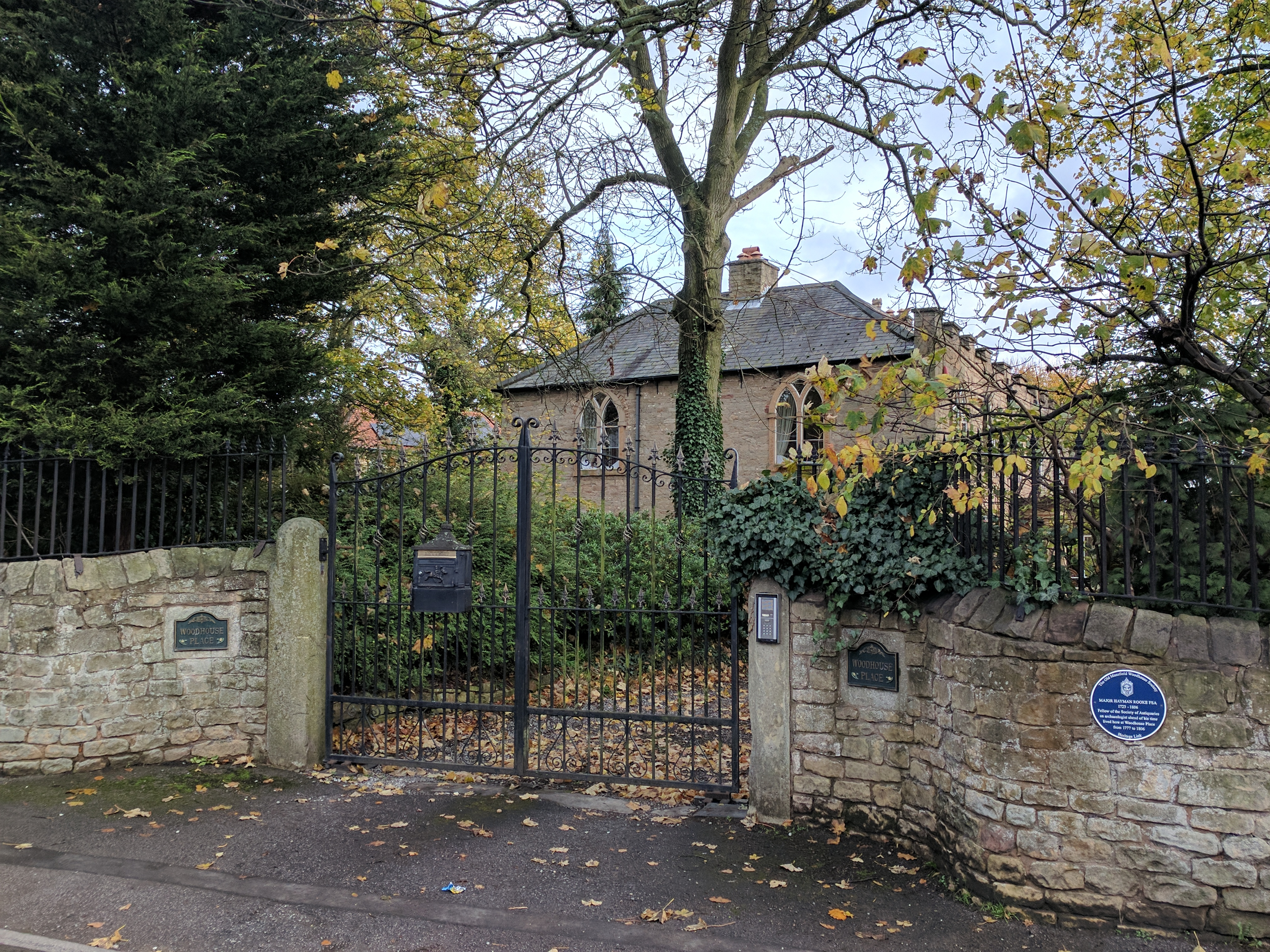
Woodhouse Place, the former home of Hayman Rooke with the blue plaque to the right

Major Hayman Rooke (1723–1806) was an English antiquarian and British Army soldier who discovered the Major Oak tree in Sherwood Forest and two Roman Villas near Mansfield Woodhouse, Nottinghamshire. The Major Oak is named after him.

== Biography ==
Hayman Rooke was born on 20 February 1723 and baptised at St Martin-in-the-Fields in City of Westminster on 19 March of the same year.

After a modest military career, in which he achieved the rank of major in the 30th Regiment of Foot, Hayman Rooke retired to Mansfield Woodhouse in Nottinghamshire and turned himself into an antiquary. He is particularly associated with Roman finds around Mansfield Woodhouse, but he was a pioneer archaeologist within the county of Nottinghamshire. Despite having no formal training, he was well versed in a range of archaeological fields, and a frequent contributor to the journal Archaeologia between 1776 and 1796. He wrote about the Romans as well as writing about medieval churches and local great estates such as Welbeck, Bolsover, Haddon Hall and Thoresby.

Hayman Rooke died on 18 September 1806 and is buried in the chancel of the Church of St Edmund, Mansfield Woodhouse. The Major Oak is named in his honour and in recognition of his writings and love of Sherwood Forest.

Hayman Rooke was a magistrate and deputy lieutenant for Nottinghamshire. His former residence, Woodhouse Place in Mansfield Woodhouse received a blue plaque in 2015.

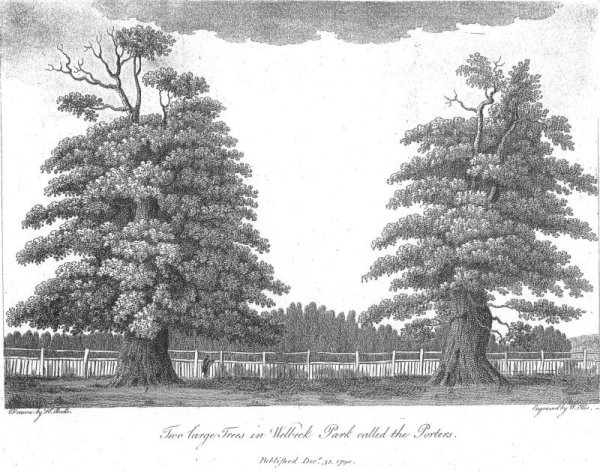
"Two large trees in Welbeck Park called the Porters" by Hayman Rooke, engraved by W. Ellis, 1790

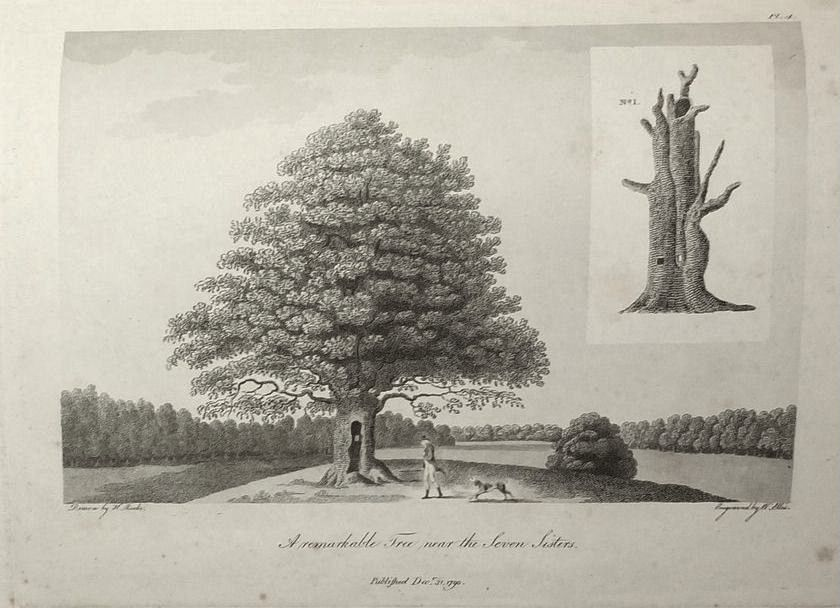
An oak tree discovered by Hayman Rooke
