= Sherwood Forest =

Royal forest in Nottinghamshire, England

- IUCN category IV (habitat/species management area)
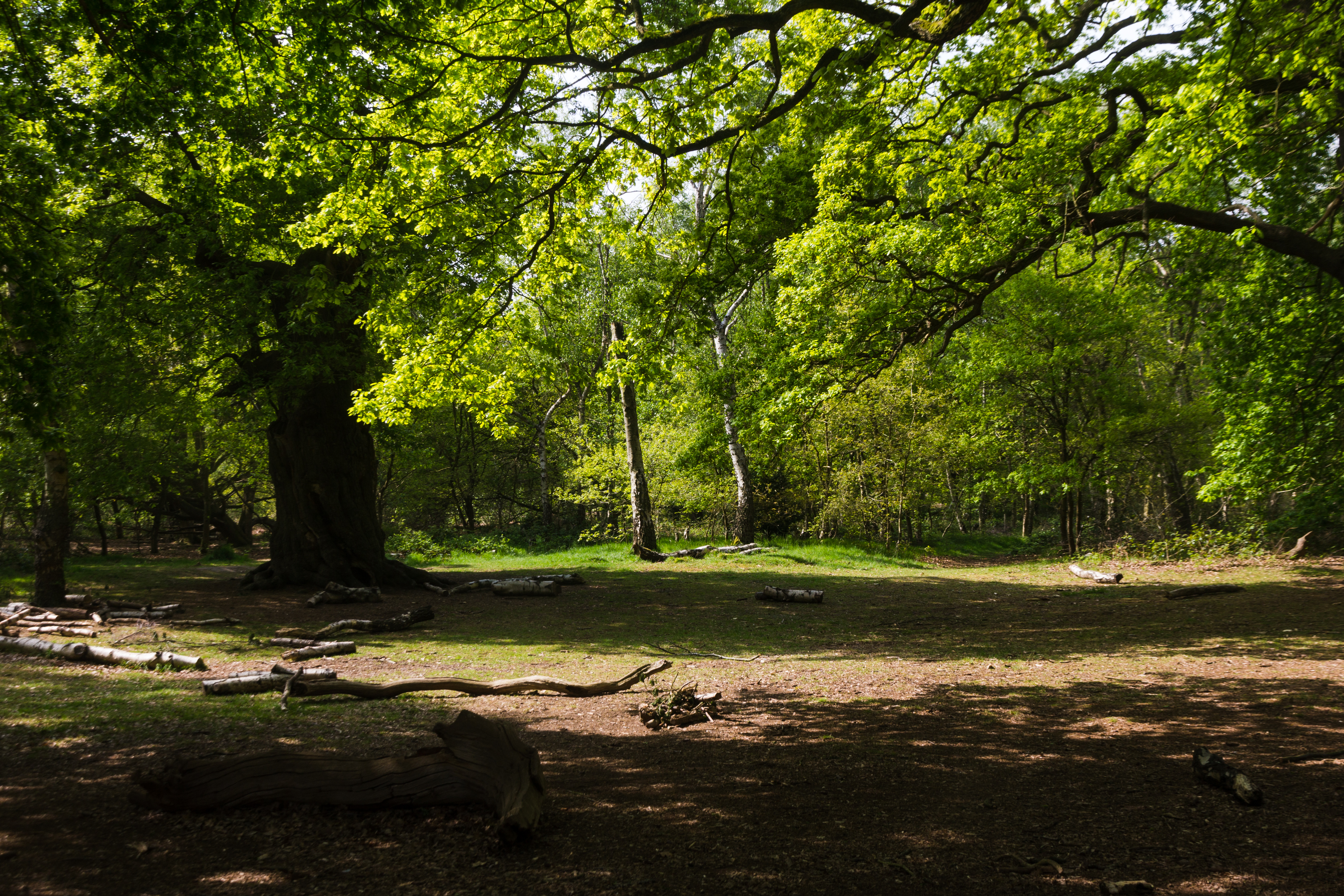

- Location within England
- Location: Nottinghamshire, England
- Coordinates: 53°12′18″N 1°4′30″W
- Governing body: Royal Society for the Protection of Birds (RSPB), Nottinghamshire County Council, Forestry England
- Website: https://visitsherwood.co.uk/

Sherwood Forest
- Site of Special Scientific Interest
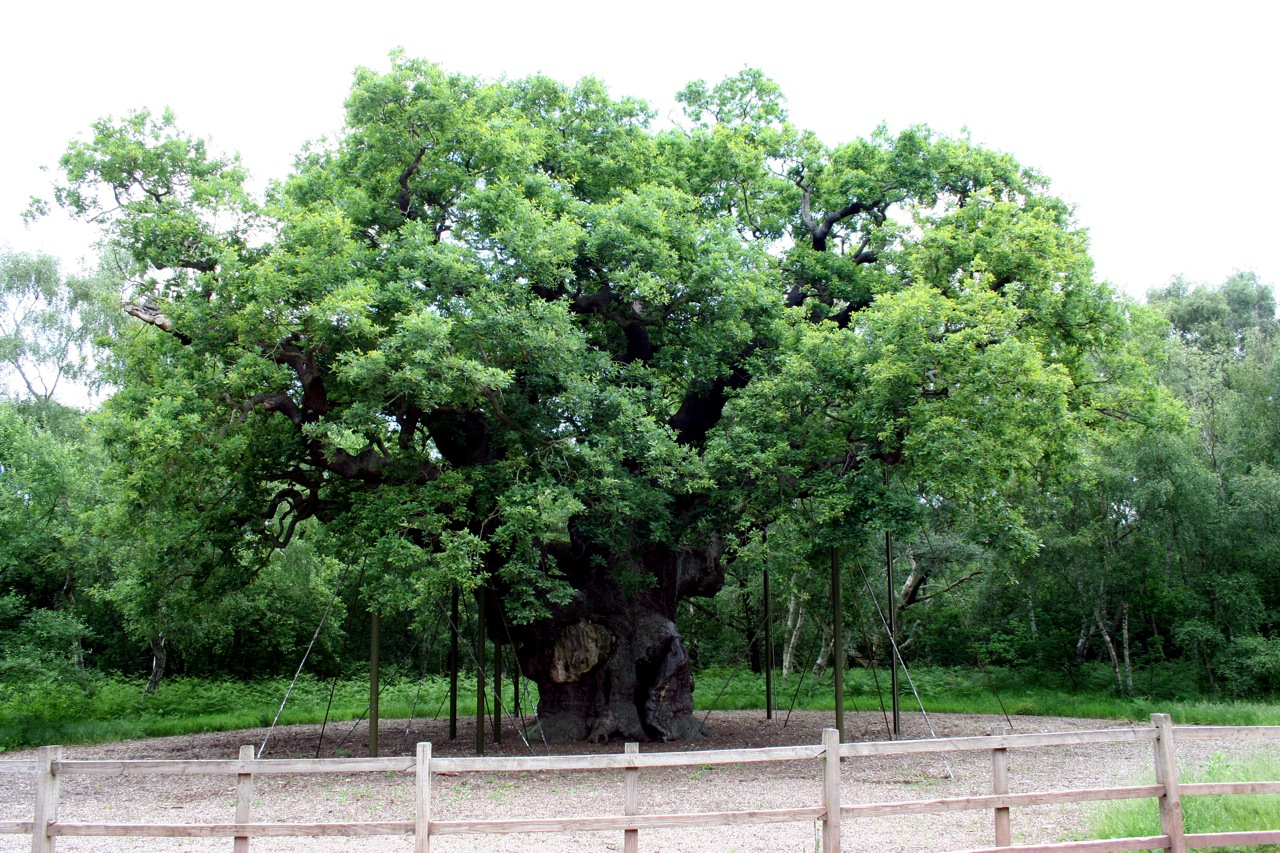
- The Major Oak in 2008
- Location of Sherwood Forest.
- Area of search: Nottinghamshire
- Interest: Biological; Geological
- Area: 200 ha (490 acres)
- Notification date: 1981

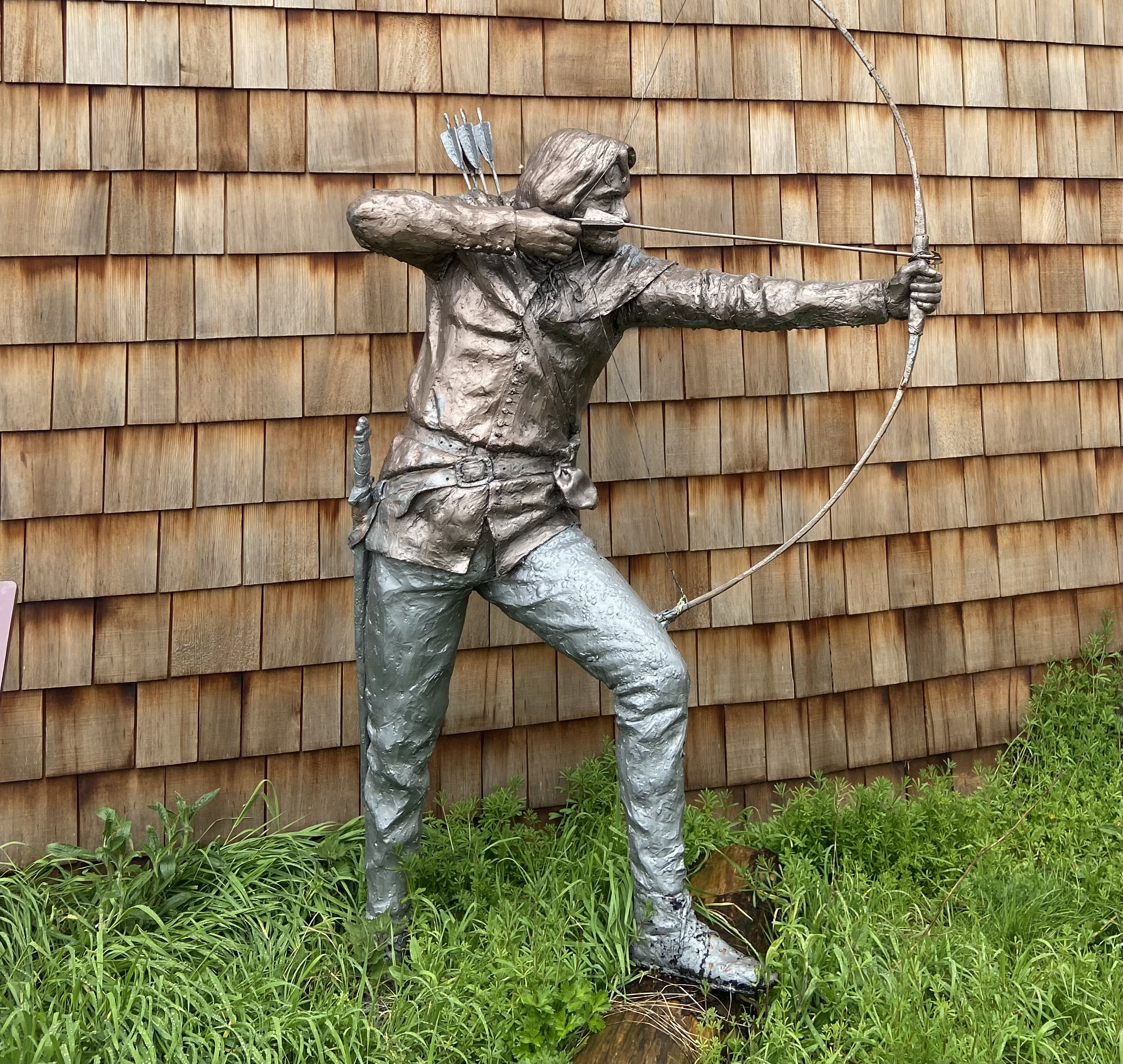
Robin Hood Statue, Sherwood Forest

Sherwood Forest consists of the remnants of an ancient royal forest in Nottinghamshire, in the East Midlands region of England. It is associated with the legend of Robin Hood. The forest was proclaimed by William the Conqueror and mentioned in the Domesday Book in 1086. The reserve has the highest concentration of ancient trees in Europe.

Today, Sherwood Forest National Nature Reserve protects 424.75 hectares (1,049.6 acres), surrounding the village of Edwinstowe and the site of Thoresby Hall. The reserve contains more than a thousand ancient oaks which are known to be more than 500 years old, with the Major Oak being twice that age.

== Etymology ==
Sherwood originally was named Sciryuda in 958 AD, meaning the "woodland belonging to the shire". Its name is derived from its status as the shire (or sher) wood of Nottinghamshire, which extended into several neighbouring counties (shires), bordered to the west by the River Erewash and the Forest of East Derbyshire.

Sherwood Forest is within an area which used to be called "Birch Lund", which is Viking in origin, now known as Birklands.

== Prehistory ==
The area has been wooded since the end of the Last Glacial Period (as attested by pollen sampling cores). This was about 10,000 years ago.

Evidence of flint tools have shown use in Sherwood Forest by prehistoric hunter gatherers. During the Iron Age and Roman periods human habitation and farming was common. In the 9th century farming made an impact on Sherwood's landscape.

== History ==
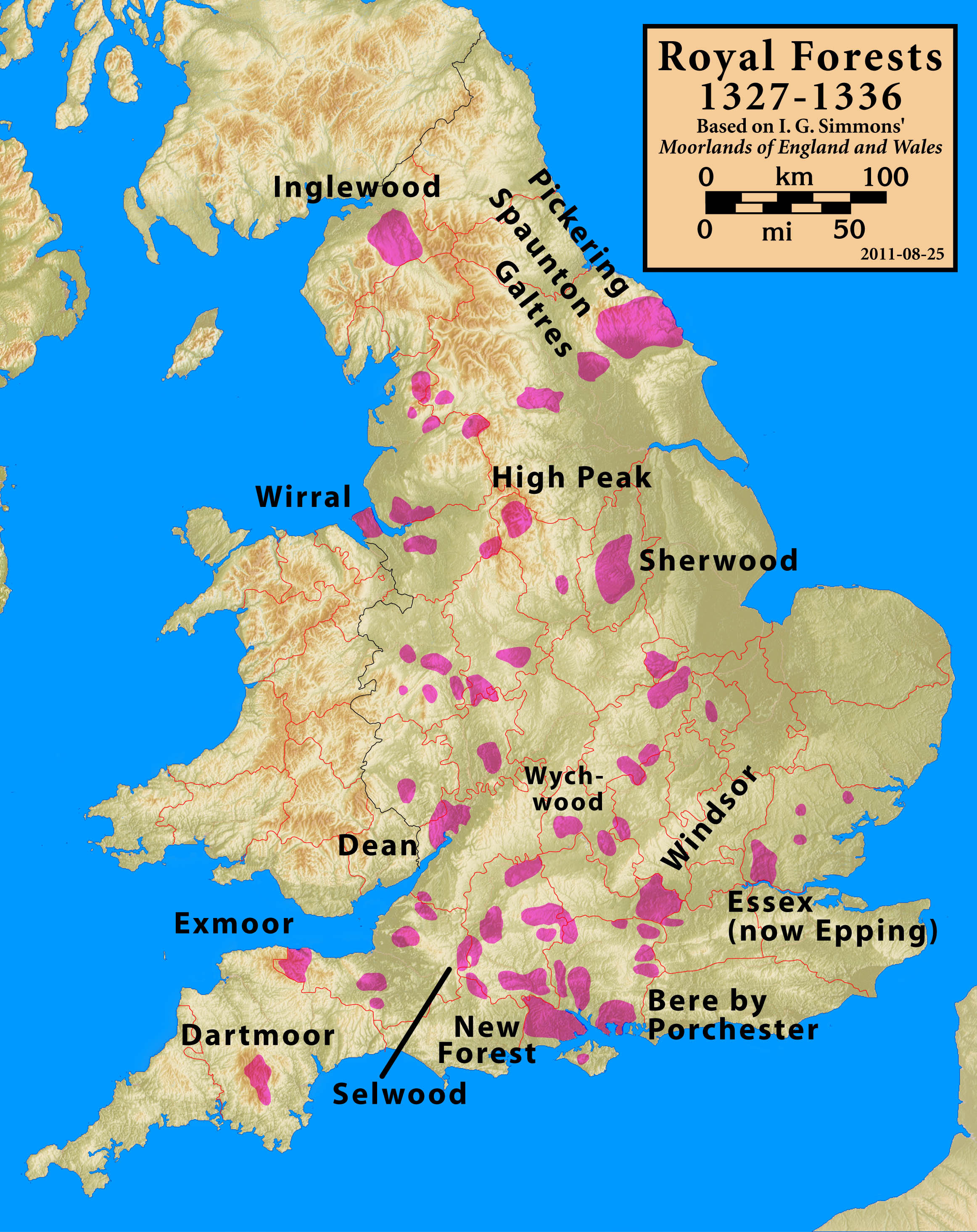
Royal Forests between 1327 and 1336

During Roman Britain various camps were discovered in parts of Sherwood Forest. It is to this that two remains of Roman villas were identified in nearby Mansfield Woodhouse by Major Hayman Rooke in 1787.

Sherwood Forest was first recorded as being named Sciryuda in 958 AD.

King Edwin of Northumbria in 633 AD was killed at Hatfield Chase in a battle against his Mercian rival King Penda of Mercia and his body was carried into the forest and buried/hidden in St Mary's Church, Edwinstowe. His head was later buried in York and his body in Whitby.

The village of Edwinstowe takes its name from King Edwin of Northumbria.

In 1066, in the invasion of England, William the Conqueror made Sherwood Forest a Royal Hunting Forest. When the Domesday Book was compiled in 1086, the forest covered perhaps a quarter of Nottinghamshire (approximately 19,000 acres or 7,800 hectares) in woodland and heath subject to the forest laws.

The earliest notice of the forest at Sherwood was at the time of Henry II when William Peverel the Younger answered the plea of the forest, to which he profited and controlled the area.

During the 12th and 13th centuries Christian Monastic Orders had established large estates within Sherwood Forest. Three Abbeys were founded Rufford Abbey, Newstead Abbey and Thurgarton Priory.

Sherwood Forest was frequently visited by the Mercian Kings.The forest became popular with King John and Edward I. The remains of a hunting lodge can be found at Kings Clipstone named King John's Palace. Prior to King John reluctantly signing the Magna Carta at Runnymede in 1215, the Forest Laws came with much displeasure to the ruling classes of the forest.

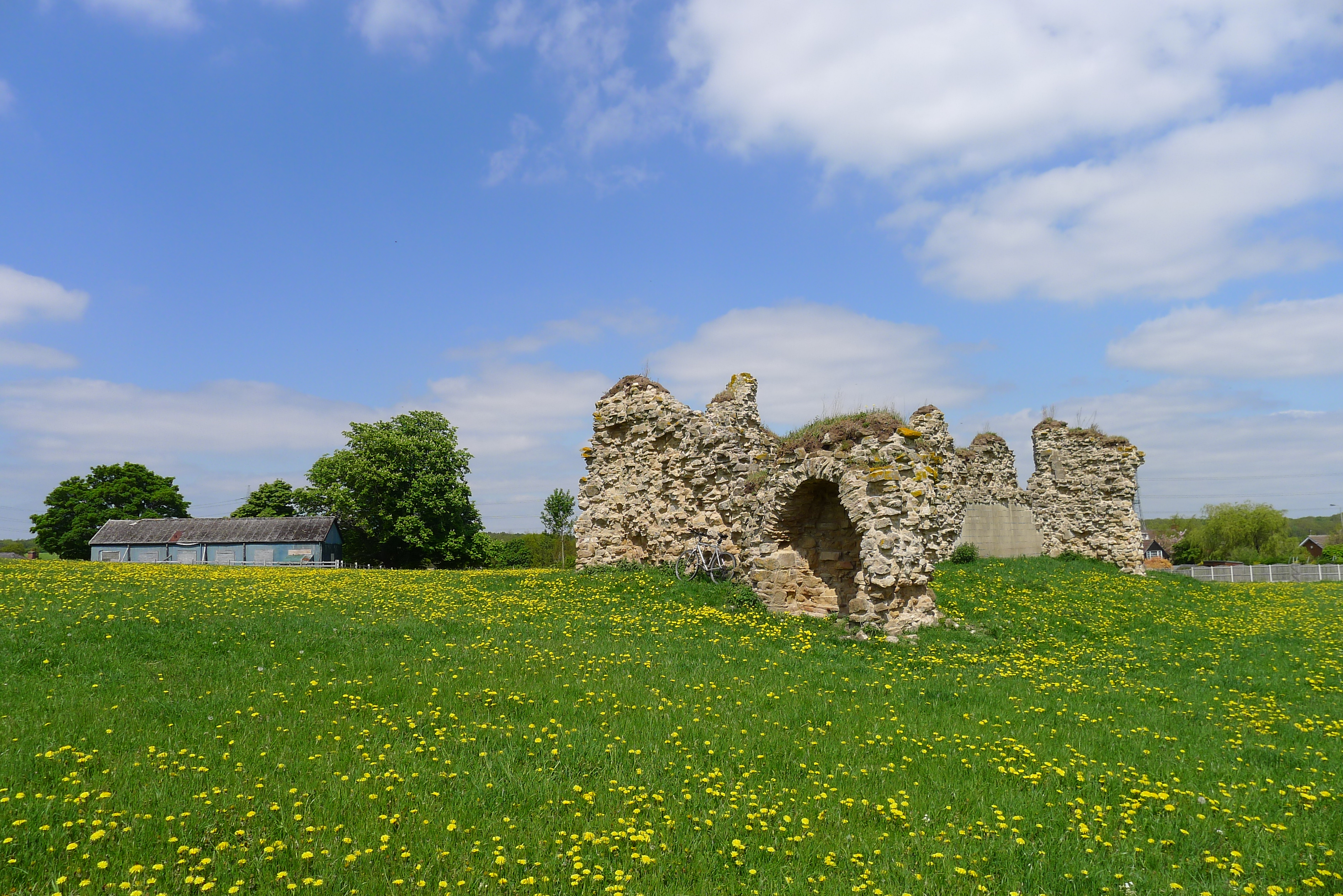
King John's Palace, Kings Clipstone

After the dissolution of the monasteries by Henry VIII in 1536, the land of Sherwood was sold and granted into private ownership which was converted into house estates. James I in the 1600s visited the forest, as did Charles I and Charles II brought back under control the management of Sherwood Forest. The oak trees from Sherwood Forest were used to build the roof of St Paul's Cathedral in London and 1st Viscount Nelson's naval fleet.

Sherwood Forest in 1623 had a narrow escape from a fire which broke out. The only record of this occurrence is written in a letter which is preserved in the British Museum.

In the 17th and 18th centuries Charles II and then Queen Anne sold large areas of Sherwood Crown Land to private owners who built the estates of Thoresby Hall, The former Clumber House, Welbeck Abbey and Worksop Manor. These estates became known as the Dukeries. Newstead Abbey was converted into a country House and Rufford Abbey was partially demolished and converted into a country House.

Mansfield anciently became pre-eminent in importance among the towns of the forest.

== Geology ==
Sherwood Forest is established over an area underlain by the Permian and Triassic age New Red Sandstone. The larger part of the Forest is found across the outcrop of pebbly sandstones known as the Chester Formation. The regional dip is a gentle one to the east, hence younger rocks are found in that direction and older ones exposed to the west. The local stratigraphy is (uppermost/youngest at top):

- Mercia Mudstone Group
  - Tarporley Siltstone Formation (siltstones, mudstones and sandstones)
    - including Retford Member (mudstones)
- Sherwood Sandstone Group
  - Chester Formation (pebbly sandstones)
  - Lenton Sandstone Formation
  - Edlington Formation (mudstones and sandstones)

The sandstone is an aquifer providing a local water supply. Quaternary deposits include river sands and gravels, river terrace deposits and some scattered mid-Pleistocene glacial till. There are 41 local geodiversity sites within the Sherwood NCA; these are largely quarries and river sections.

== Management and conservation ==
The Sherwood Forest Trust is a small charity that covers the ancient royal boundary and current national character area of Sherwood Forest. Its aims are based on conservation, heritage and communities but also include tourism and the economy.

Nottinghamshire County Council and Forestry England jointly manage the ancient remnant of forest north of the village of Edwinstowe, providing walks, footpaths and a host of other activities.

The central core of ancient Sherwood is a Site of Special Scientific Interest (SSSI) called Birklands and Bilhaugh, NNR and Special Area of Conservation (SAC). Birklands and Bilhaugh chiefly consists of British National Vegetation Classification community types W10 (Quercus robur - Pteridium aquilinum - Rubus fruticosus woodland) and W16 (Quercus spp. - Betula spp. - Deschampsia flexuosa woodland). It is a very important site for ancient oaks, wood pasture, invertebrates and fungi, as well as being linked to the legends of Robin Hood.

During the Second World War parts of Sherwood Forest were used extensively by the military for ammunition stores, POW camps and training areas. Oil was produced at Eakring. After the war, large ammunition dumps were abandoned in the forest and were not cleared until 1952, with at least 46,000 tons of ammunition in them.

Part of the forest was opened to the public as a country park in 1969 by Nottinghamshire County Council, which manages a small part of the forest under lease from the Thoresby Estate. In 2002 a portion of Sherwood Forest was designated a national nature reserve by English Nature. In 2007 Natural England officially incorporated the Budby South Forest, Nottinghamshire's largest area of dry lowland heath, into the Nature Reserve, nearly doubling its size from 220 to 423 hectares (540 to 1,050 acres).

A new Sherwood Forest Visitor Centre was authorised in 2015. In August 2018 the Royal Society for the Protection of Birds (RSPB) opened the new development with a shop and café, having been granted permission to manage the woods in 2015. Part of an agreement with Natural England was that the land where the existing 1970s visitor centre was located would be restored to wood pasture.

Some portions of the forest retain many very old oaks, especially in the portion known as the Dukeries, south of the town of Worksop, which was so called because it used to contain four ducal residences, as well as a number of other country estates.

The River Idle, a tributary of the Trent, is formed in Sherwood Forest from the confluence of several minor streams.

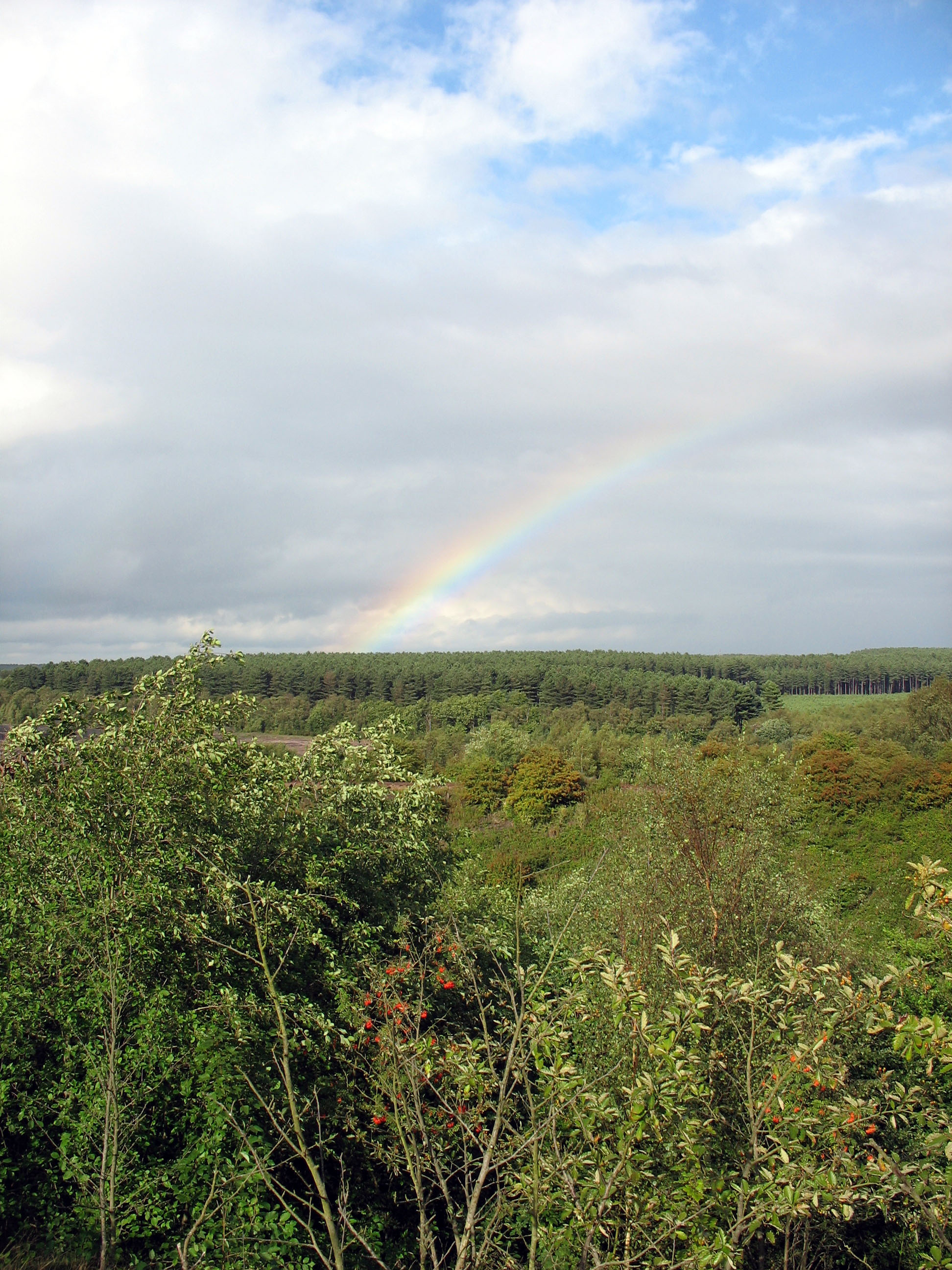
View of the Forest looking northeast

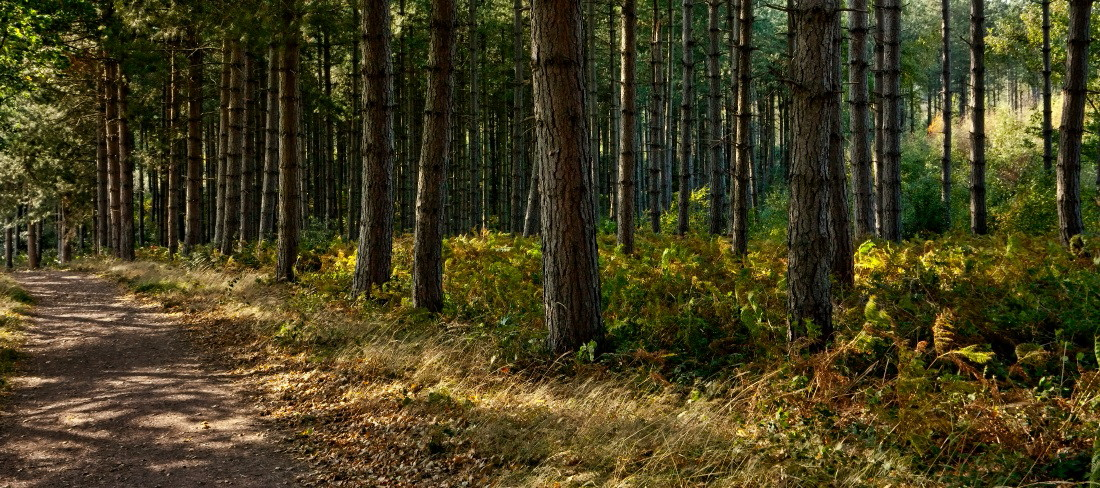
Sherwood Forest

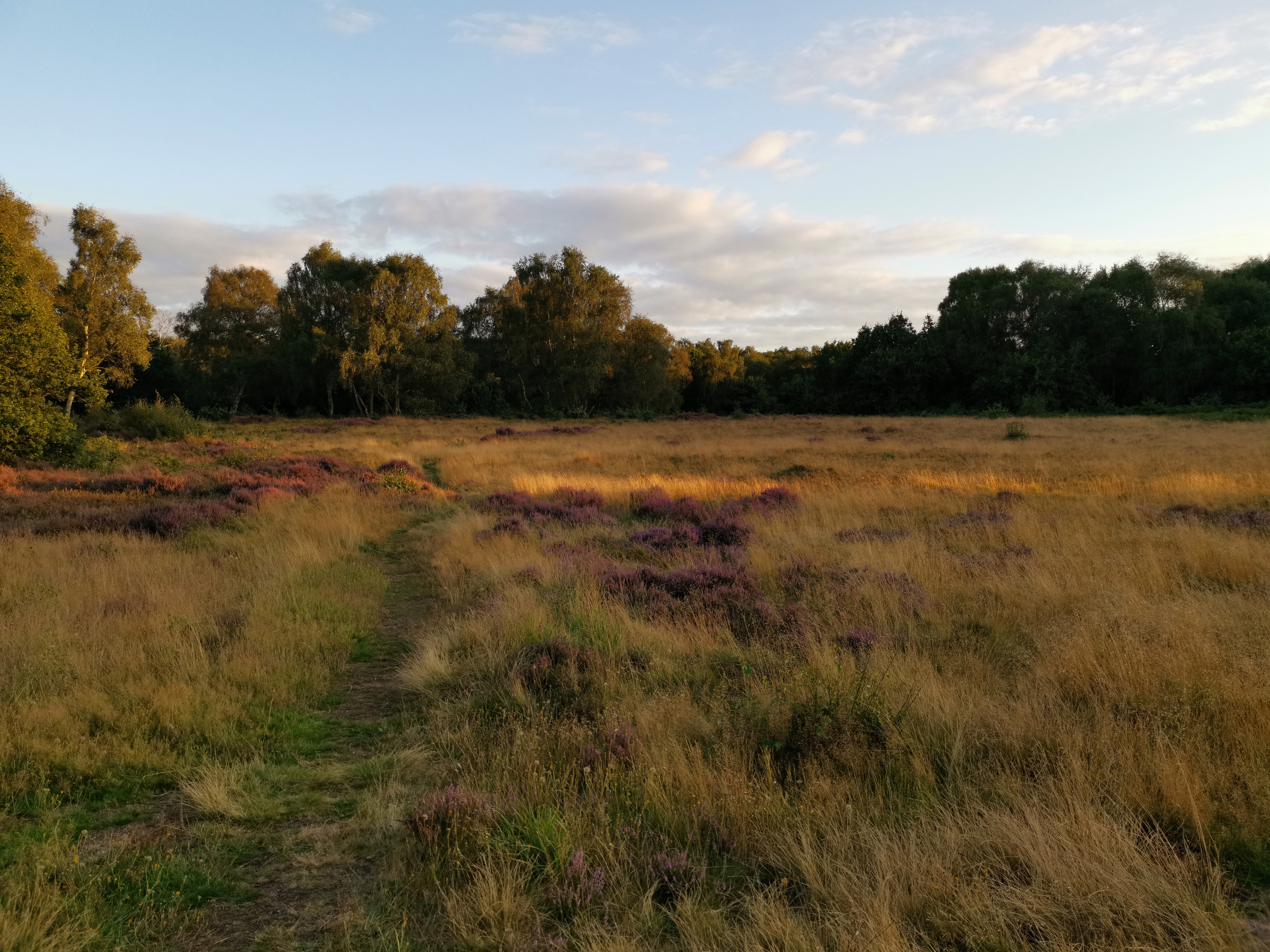
Oak Tree Heath, Sherwood Forest

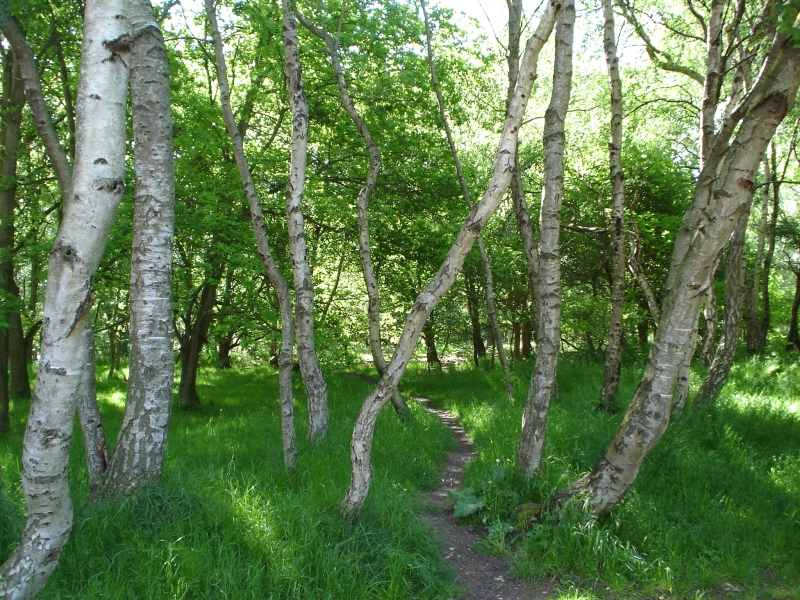
Birch trees in Sherwood Forest

== Tourism ==
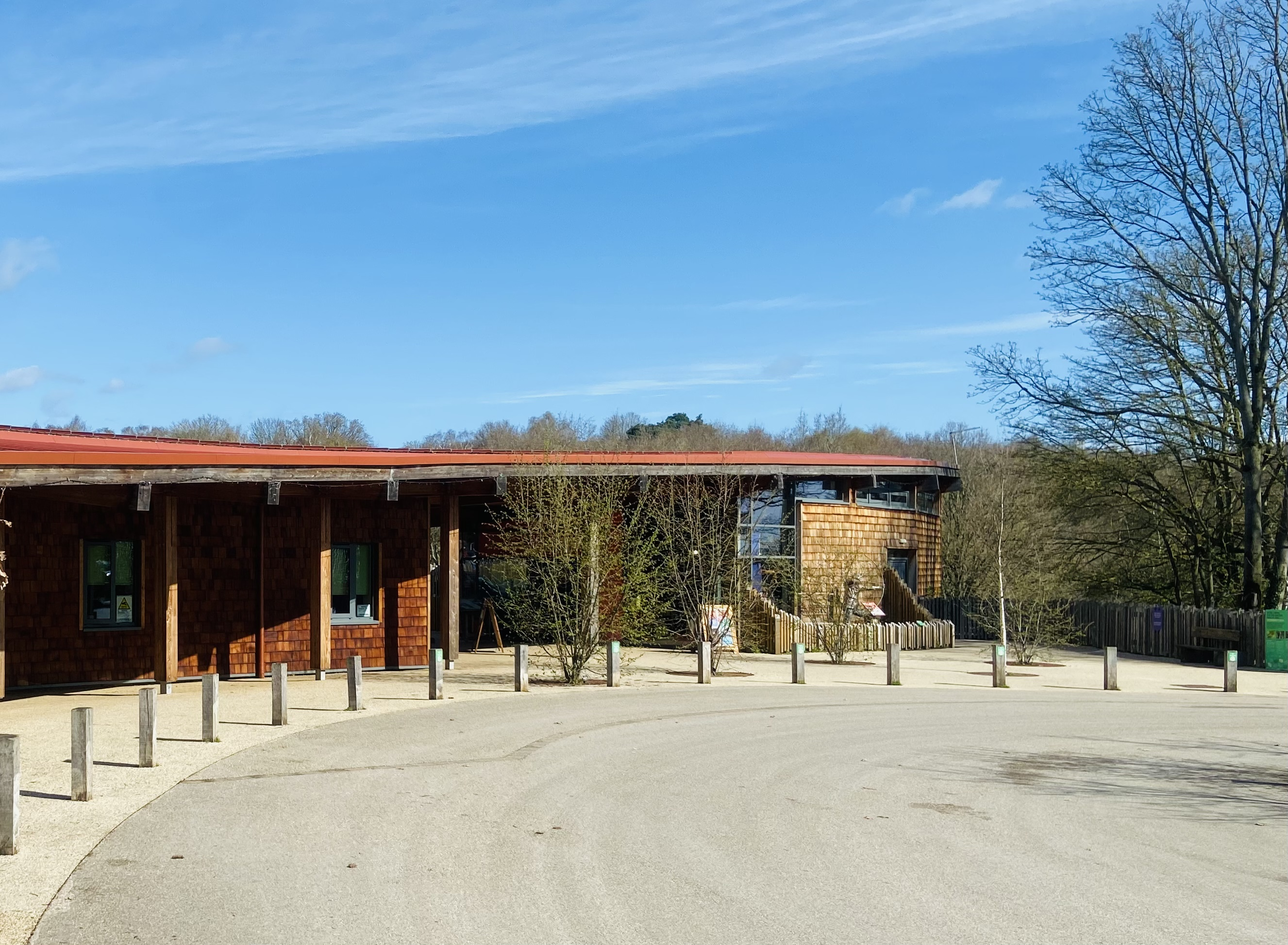
Visitor Centre

Sherwood attracts around 350,000 tourists annually, many from other countries. Each August the nature reserve hosts a week-long Robin Hood Festival. This event recreates a medieval atmosphere and features the major characters from the Robin Hood legend. The week's entertainment includes jousters and strolling players dressed in medieval attire, in addition to a medieval encampment complete with jesters, musicians, rat-catchers, alchemists and fire eaters.

The Sherwood Forest Art and Craft Centre is in the former coach house and stables of Edwinstowe Hall. The centre contains art studios and a café and hosts special events, including craft demonstrations and exhibitions.

=== Other tourist destinations nearby ===
- Thoresby Hall, and park
- Rufford Abbey country park. Rufford Abbey is owned by English Heritage with the park managed by Parkwood Outdoors.
- Clumber Park is a former estate of Clumber House. The park is owned by the National Trust.
- Sherwood Pines Forest Park which also houses a Go Ape site. Adjacent is Center Parcs UK and Ireland Sherwood Forest.
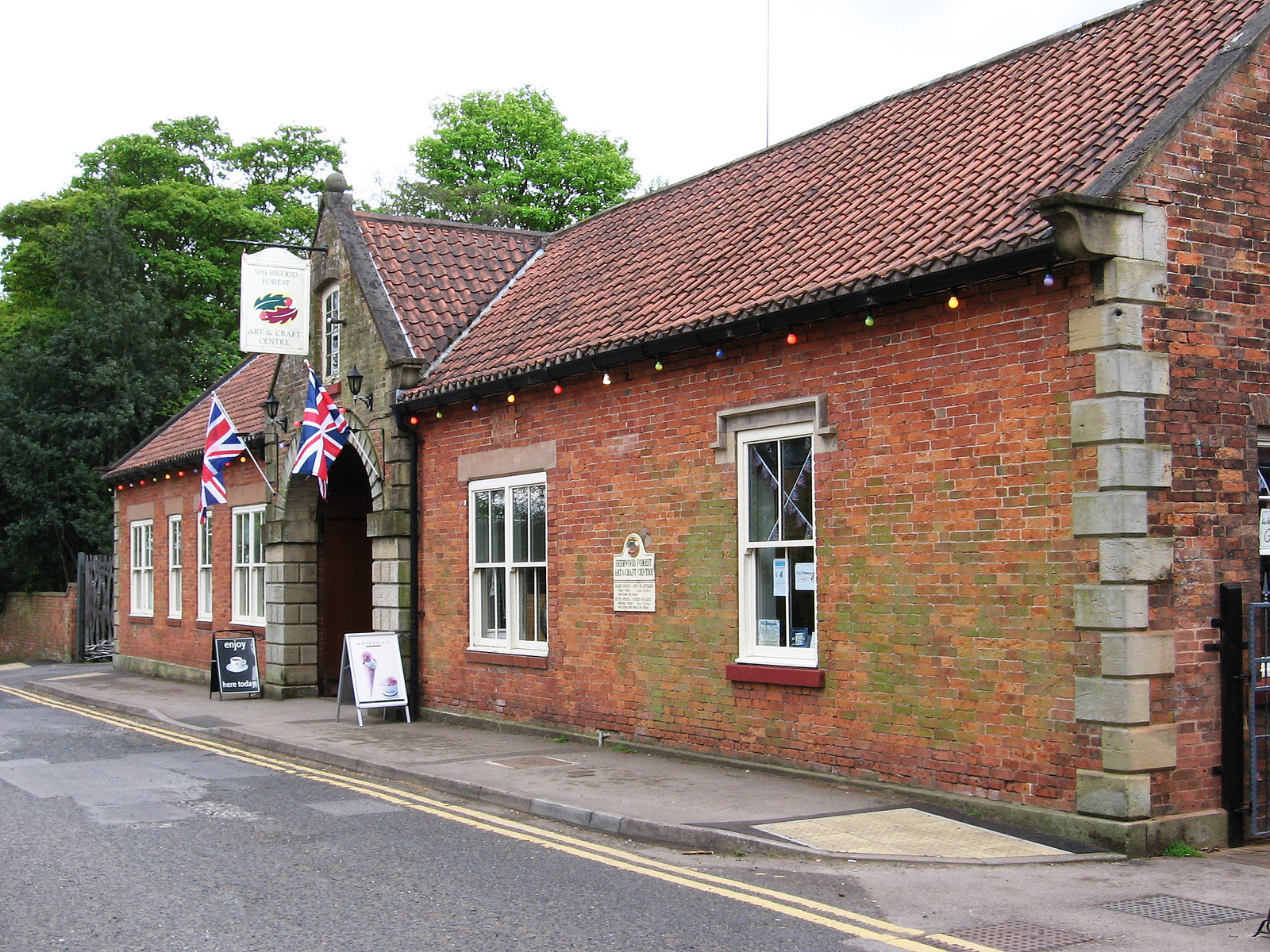
Sherwood Forest Art and Craft Centre

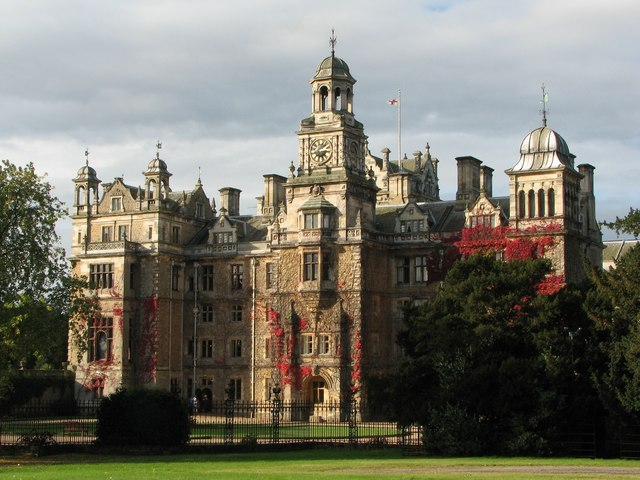
Thoresby Hall

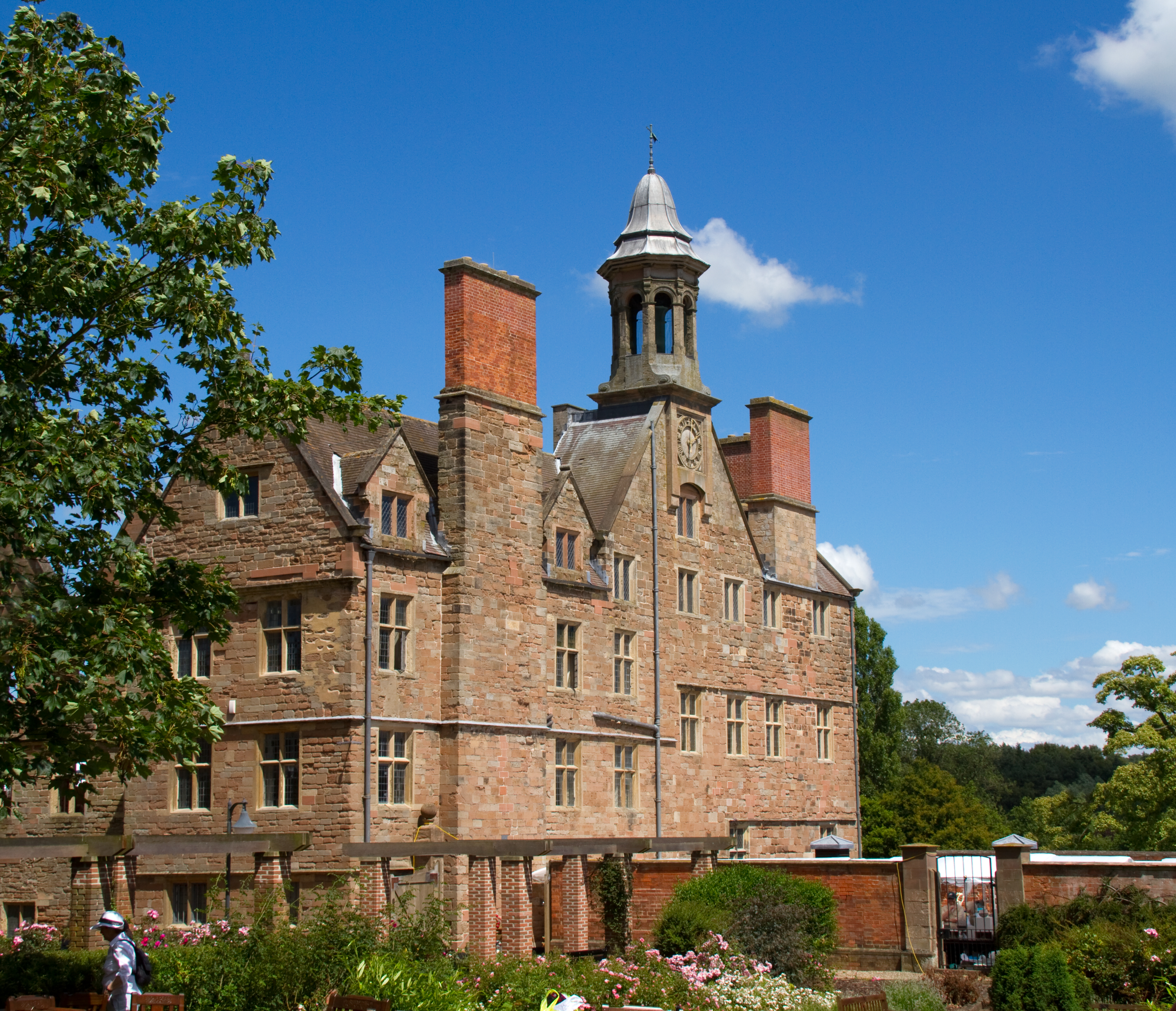
Rufford Abbey

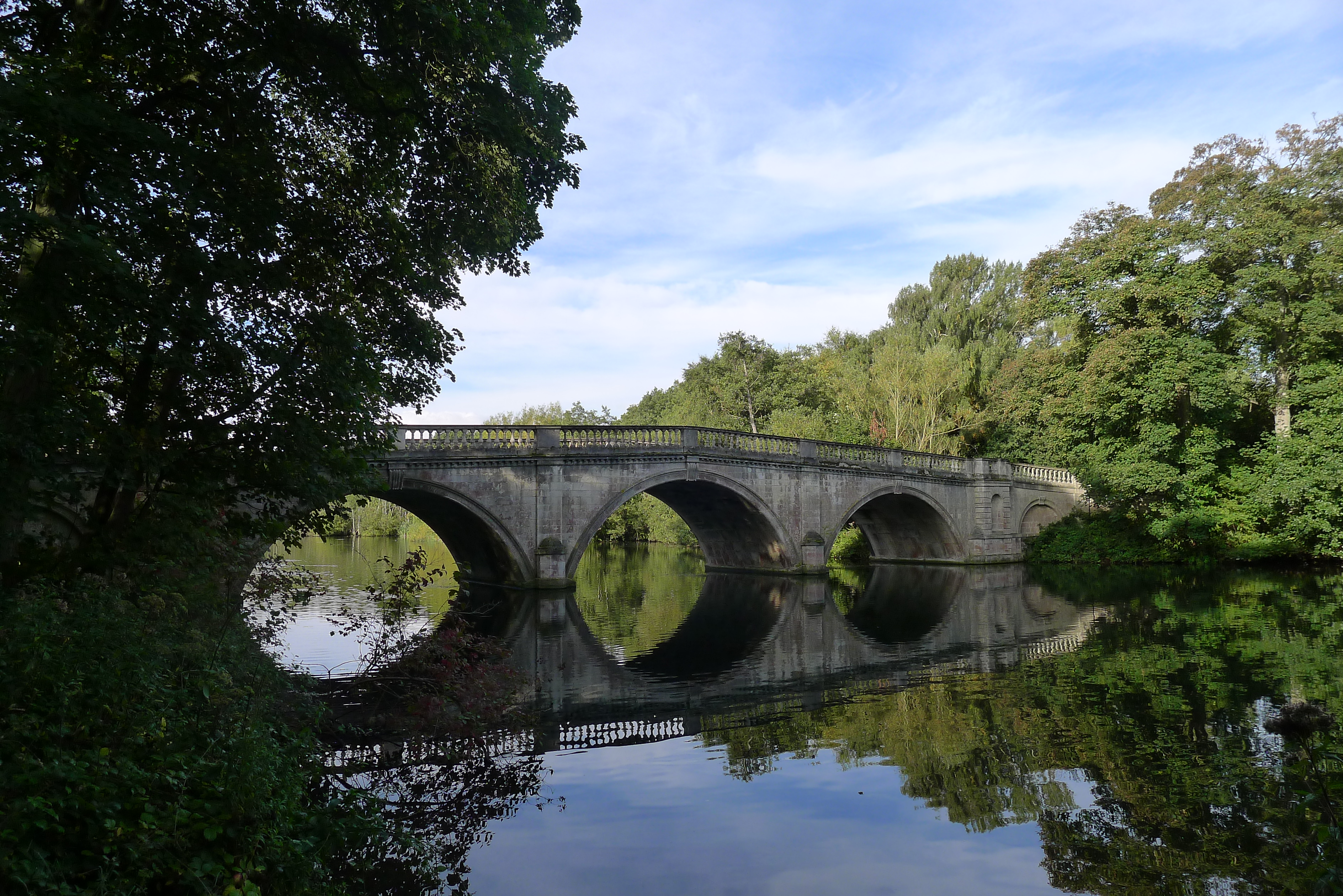
Clumber Park

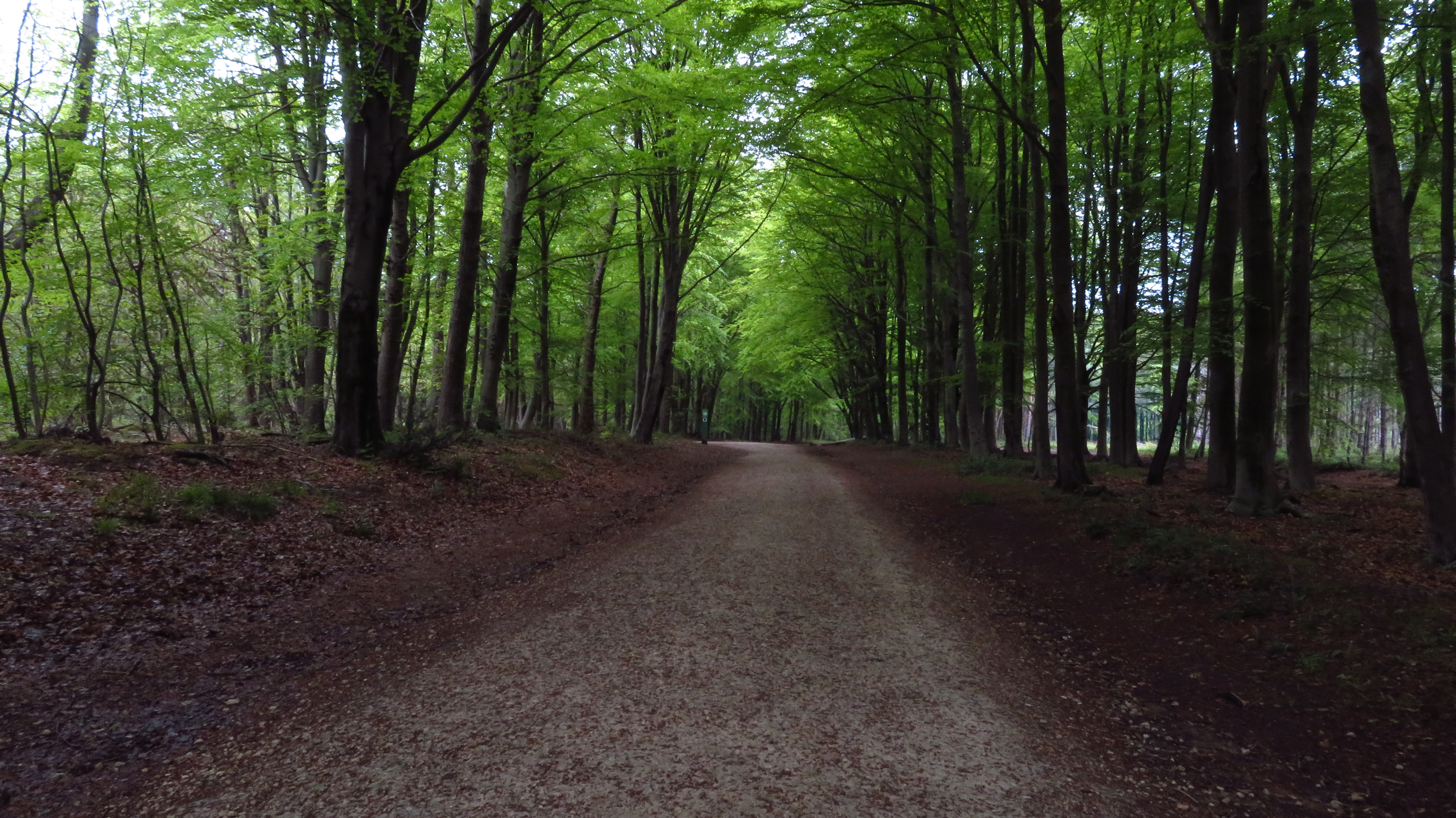
Sherwood Pines Forest Park

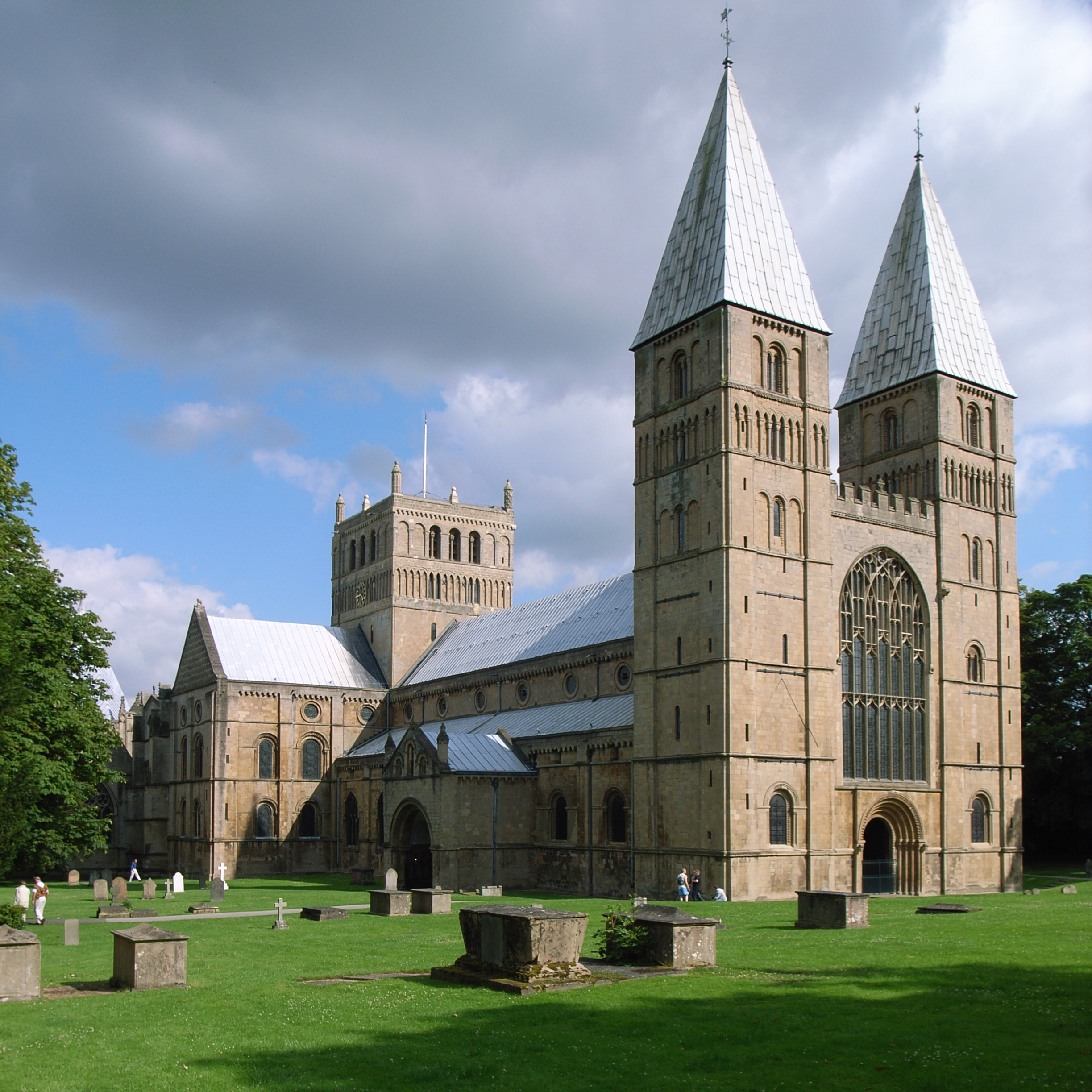
Southwell Minster

=== Nearest towns/cities to Sherwood Forest ===
- Mansfield
- Newark on Trent
- Nottingham
- Southwell, Nottinghamshire
- Southwell
- Worksop

== Major Oak ==
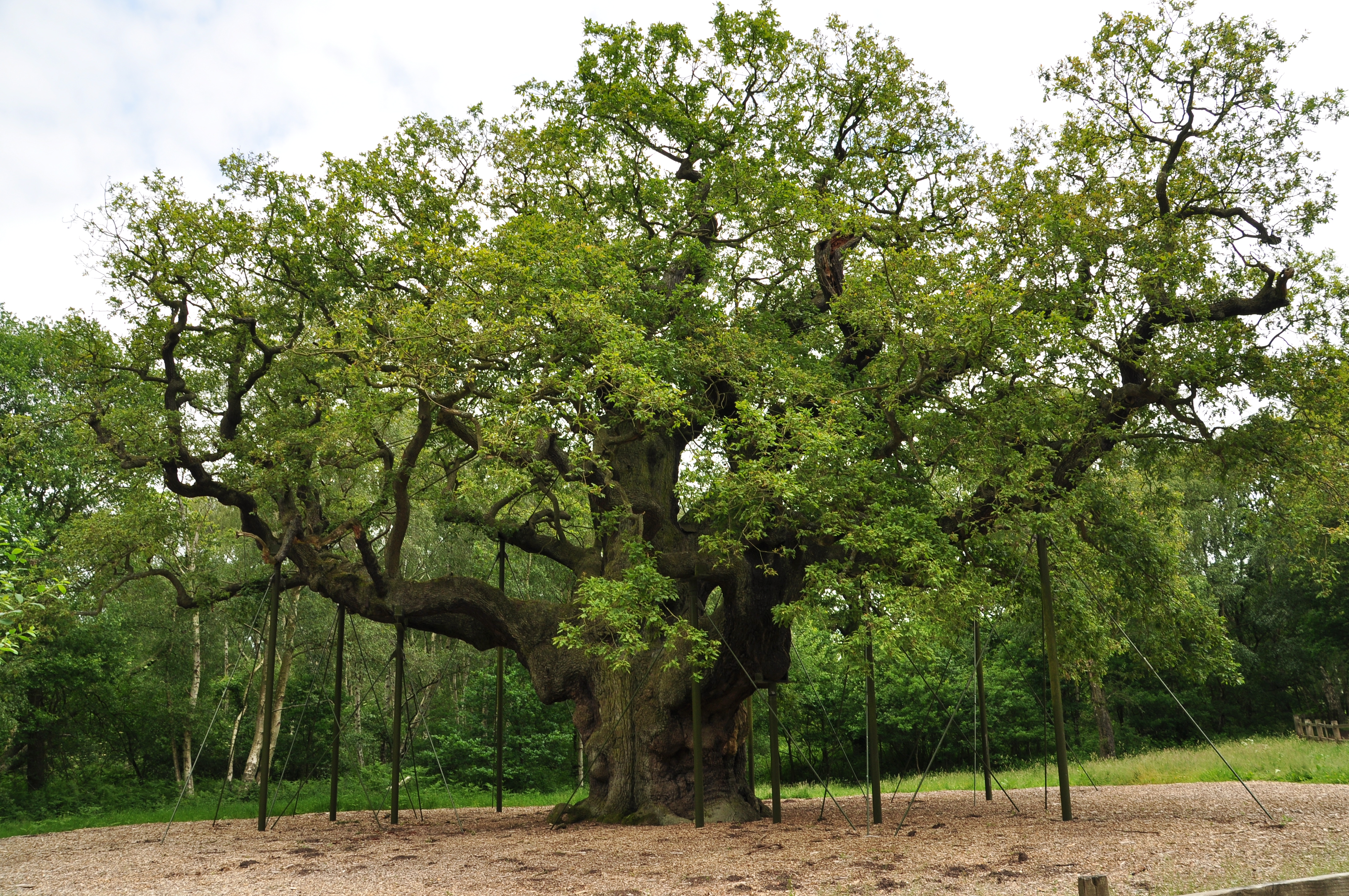
Major Oak in 2014

Sherwood Forest is home to the Major Oak, an oak tree between 800 and 1,000 years old, and since the Victorian era, its limbs have been partially supported by scaffolding. The Major Oak was identified by Major Hayman Rooke in 1790. It is believed that the Major Oak took the name of Major Hayman Rooke. The Major Oak used to be named the Cockpen Tree, after the cockfighting that once took place beneath it. According to the legend, Robin Hood and his outlaws used this tree to hide from the Sheriff of Nottingham.

The Major Oak was featured on the 2005 BBC TV programme Seven Natural Wonders as one of the natural wonders of the Midlands.

The Major Oak was confirmed to be dead in 2026. Saplings of the Major Oak have been planted in the US ambassadors' Winfield House in London.

== Parliament Oak ==
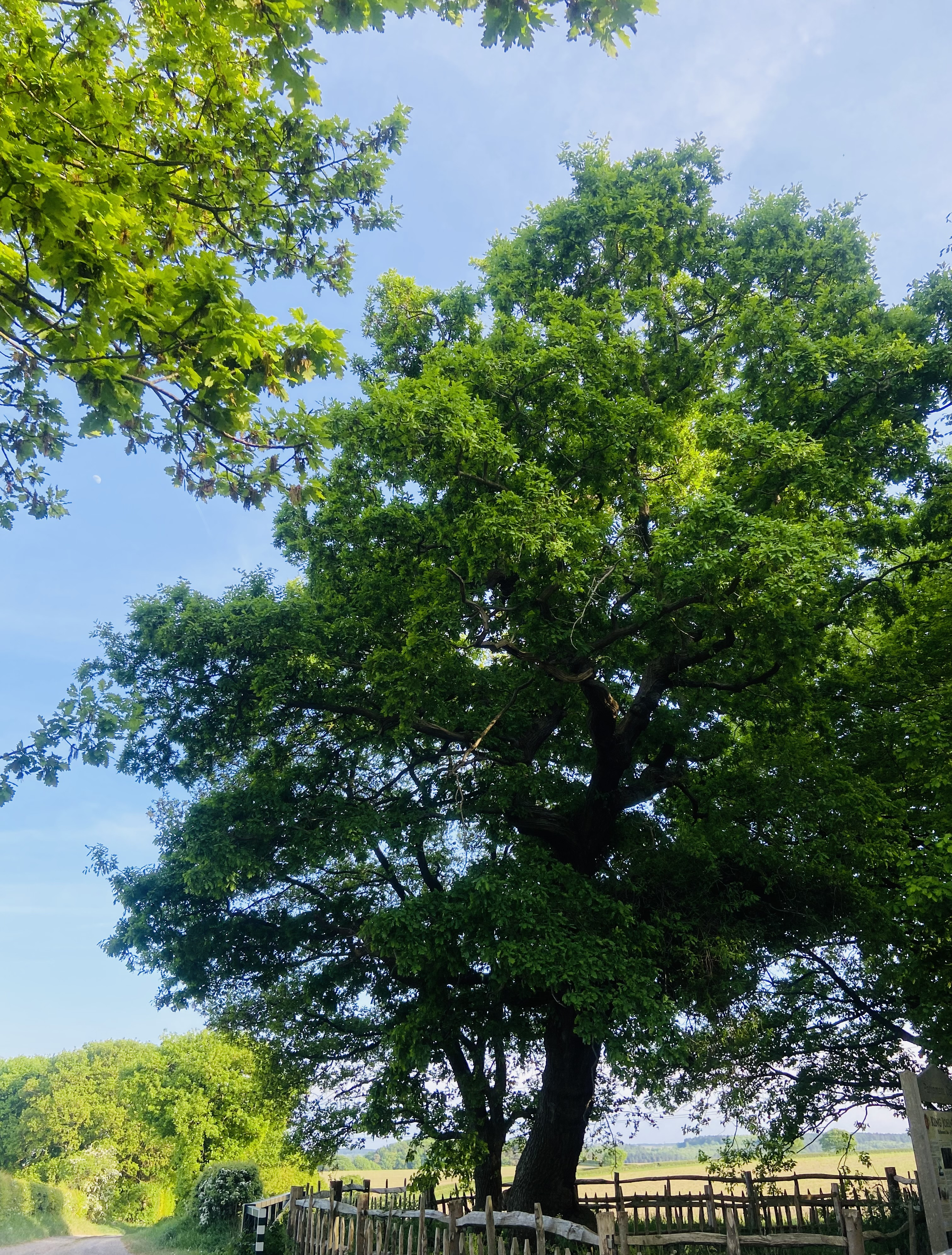
Parliament Oak, Peafield Lane

The Parliament Oak is situated in Sherwood Forest near Market Warsop. It is reputed that King John in 1212 and King Edward I in 1290 held impromptu parliaments at the tree.

== Thynghowe ==
Thynghowe, an important Danelaw meeting place where people came to resolve disputes and settle issues, was lost to history until its rediscovery in 2005 by local history enthusiasts amidst the old oaks of an area known as the Birklands. Experts believe it may also yield clues about the boundary of the ancient Anglo-Saxon kingdoms of Mercia and Northumbria.

English Heritage inspected the site, confirming that it was known as 'Thynghowe' in 1334 and 1609.

== Politics ==
The forest gives its name to the Parliamentary constituency of Sherwood Forest (formerly Sherwood before the 2023 Periodic Review of Westminster constituencies). This is represented by one member of parliament.

== See also ==
- List of ancient woods in England
- List of forests in the United Kingdom
- Sherwood Foresters, a British Army regiment associated with Nottinghamshire
