= Major Oak =

Ancient tree in Sherwood Forest, England

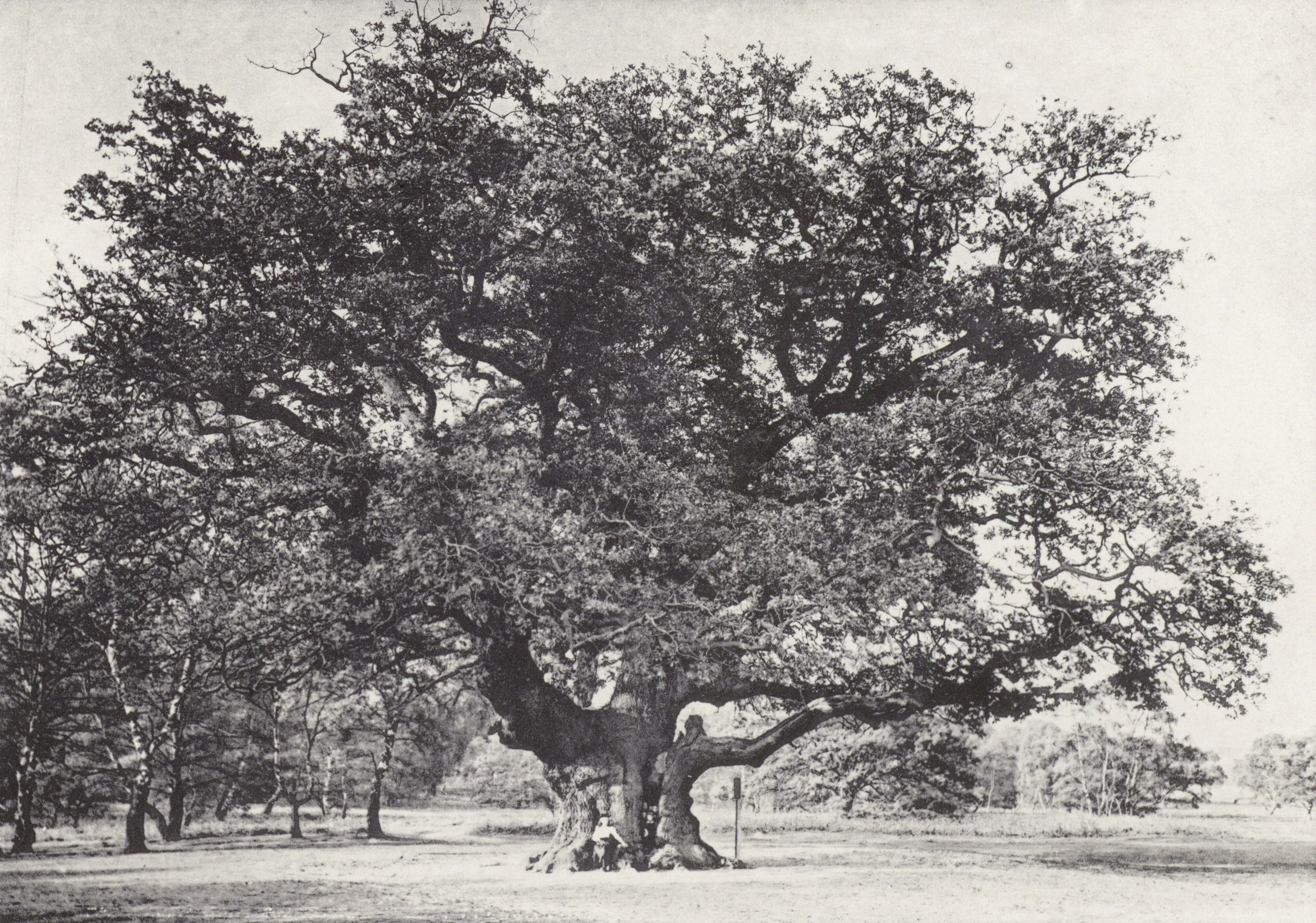
- The Major Oak, c. 1890
- Interactive map of Major Oak
- Species: English oak (Quercus robur)
- Location: Sherwood Forest, Nottinghamshire, England
- Coordinates: 53°12′16.7″N 1°4′20.8″W
- Custodian: Royal Society for the Protection of Birds

The Major Oak is a large dead English oak (Quercus robur) near Edwinstowe, in the midst of Sherwood Forest, Nottinghamshire, England. Thought to be between 800 and 1,200 years old, the tree was estimated to weigh 23 long tons and had a canopy of 92 feet (28 m) at its peak. According to local folklore, it was the shelter of Robin Hood and his Merry Men.

In June 2026, the Royal Society for the Protection of Birds (RSPB), which manages the forest, announced that the tree had died after failing to produce leaves that year. This was attributed to prolonged stress from a series of hot, dry summers, soil compaction, changes to the water table due to nearby coal mining, and counter-productive measures taken to preserve it.

== Description ==
In 1999 the Major Oak was estimated to weigh 23 long tons, had a girth of 33 feet (10 m) and a canopy of 92 feet (28 m) at its peak, and was thought to be between 800 and 1,200 years old.

== Name ==
The tree was originally known as the Cockpen Tree, after the cockfighting that once took place beneath it. It was later named the Major Oak after Major Hayman Rooke, a British Army soldier and antiquarian who described the tree in his 1790 book Description and Sketches of Some Remarkable Oaks, writing: "I think no one can behold this majestic ruin without pronouncing it to be of very remote antiquity; and might venture to say, that it cannot be much less than a thousand years old."

== History ==
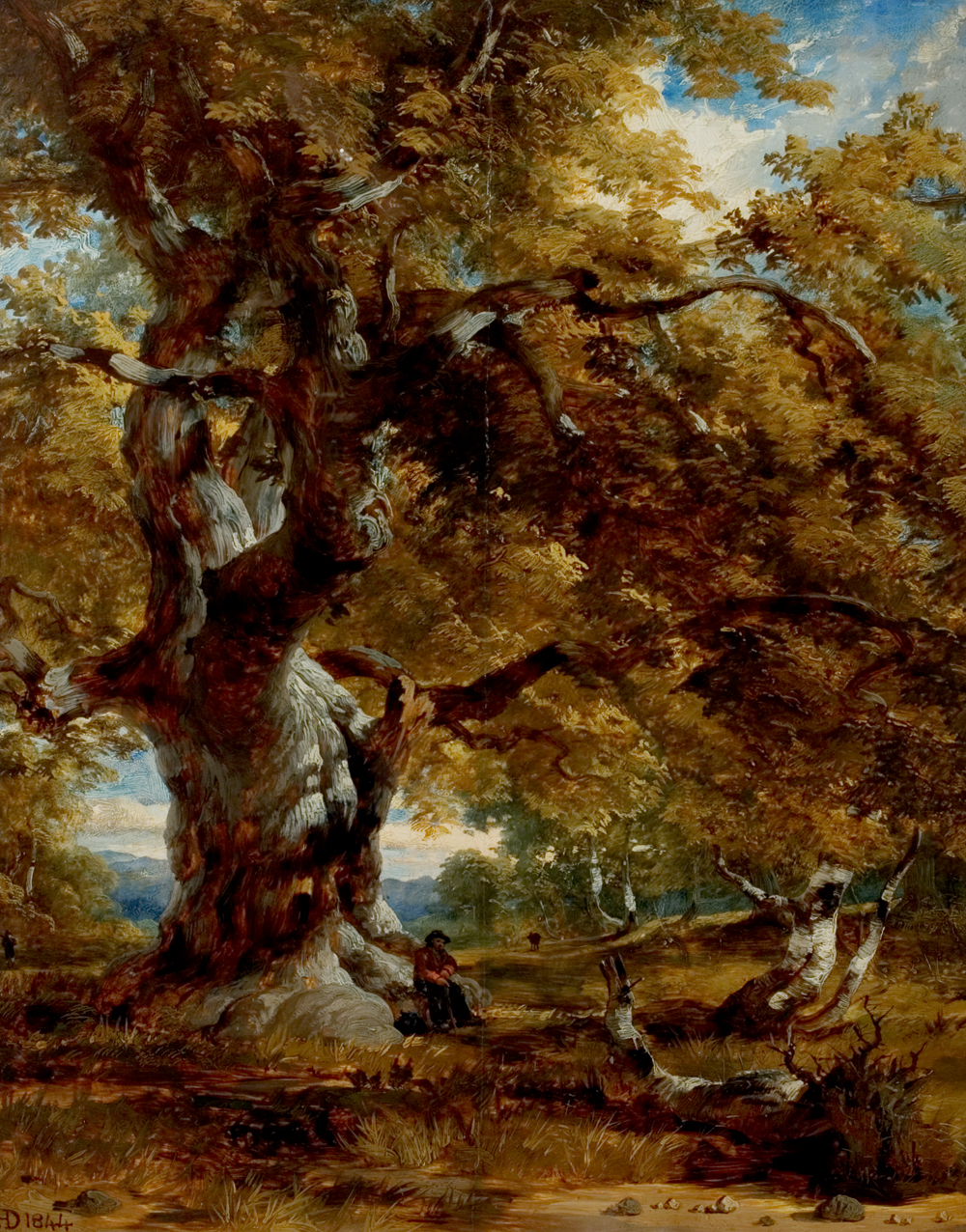
The Major Oak (1844), by Henry Dawson, Nottingham Museums

It is unclear whether the Major Oak is a single tree or several saplings that became fused together, which may account for its distinctive shape. The tree is commonly considered the UK's second-largest oak, surpassed only by the Majesty Oak in Fredville Park in the village of Nonington, near Dover, Kent.

The tree has long been linked in local folklore with Robin Hood and his Merry Men, who were said to have sheltered beneath it.

Major Hayman Rooke first formally identified the tree in 1790. Support chains were first fitted in 1908, and its massive branches were partially supported by an elaborate system of scaffolding beginning in the 1970s. In 1974, fences were installed around the tree to protect its root system, as the volume of visitors was compacting the surrounding soil.

Around 1912, Emmeline Pankhurst was among approximately 30 suffragettes reported to have climbed inside the tree.

The "Robin Hood Oak" on the campus of the State University of New York College of Environmental Science and Forestry is a direct descendant of the Major Oak, having been grown from one of the Major Oak's acorns collected in 1926.

The formation sign of the 46th Infantry Division of the British Army during World War II was the Major Oak. Among the units of the division were battalions of the Sherwood Foresters regiment.

In 1982 the tree suffered significant damage from a fire that was extinguished by the fire brigade. Nottinghamshire Police reported that the blaze had been caused by arsonists.

In a 2002 public survey, the Major Oak was voted "Britain's favourite tree". In 2003, a plantation of 260 saplings grown from acorns of the Major Oak was established in Dorset, intended to support an internet-based study of the tree's history, photographic record, variation in size and leafing among the saplings, comparison of their DNA, and to eventually serve as a public amenity. In 2013, Major Oak saplings were given to pantomime actors Barney Harwood, Su Pollard, and David Hasselhoff.

In 2014 it was voted England's Tree of the Year in a public poll organised by the Woodland Trust, receiving 18% of the votes. The tree was also featured on the 2005 television programme Seven Natural Wonders as one of the wonders of the Midlands.

As of June 2026, the tree receives approximately 350,000 visitors annually.

== Death ==
From 2022 onwards, the tree suffered from summer heat waves and produced progressively fewer leaves. Rumours of the tree's decline were initially denied by the RSPB, which manages the forest. However, its death was officially confirmed by the RSPB in June 2026, after prolonged stress from a succession of hot, dry summers caused it to fail to produce any leaves that year. The RSPB attributed part of the blame to the scaffolding, which had artificially forced the tree to pump water towards its propped-up branches – at the expense of its trunk – rather than allowing it to shed branches naturally and begin "growing down", as would be expected for a tree of its age. Additional contributing factors included soil compaction resulting from two centuries of tourist and vehicular traffic, and alterations to the water table caused by nearby coal mining.

The Major Oak is situated within a Site of Special Scientific Interest and will remain standing rather than being felled.

== Gallery ==
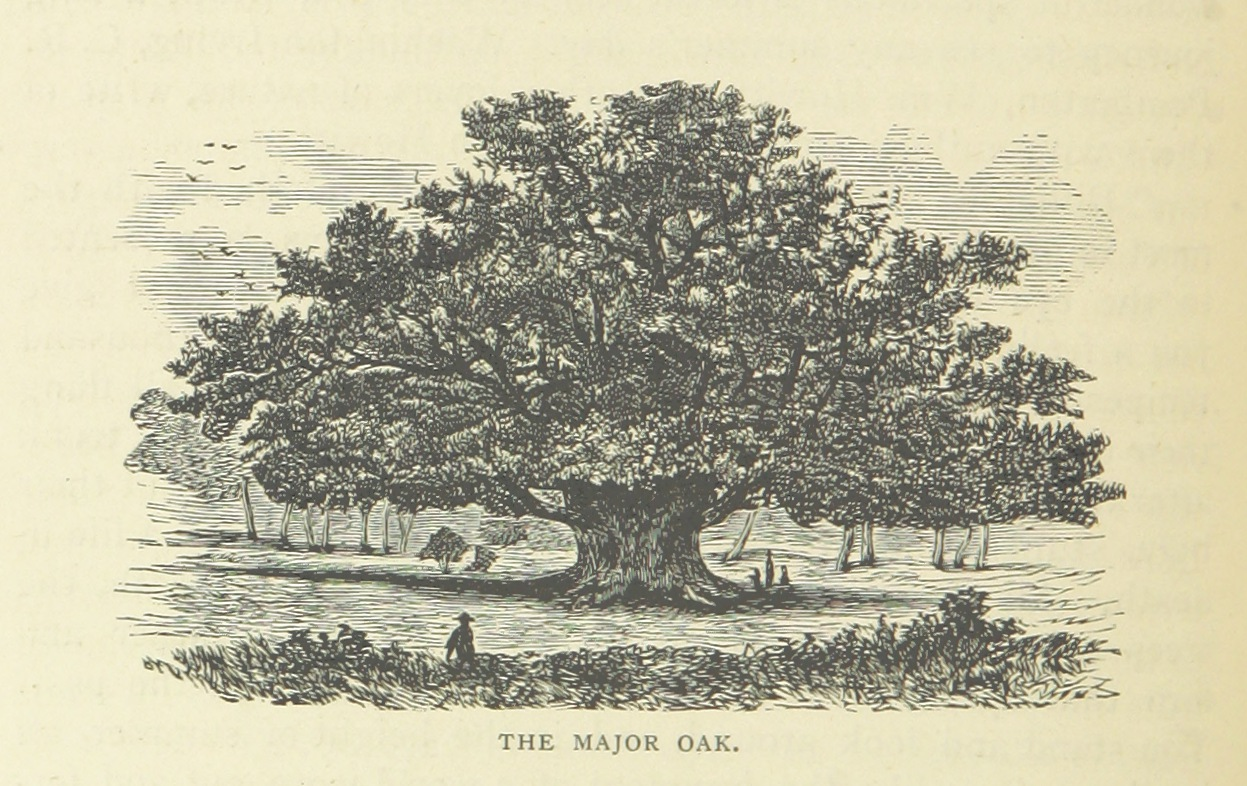
Illustration in The Illustrated Guide to Sheffield and the Surrounding District, Etc., by John Taylor of Sheffield (1879)

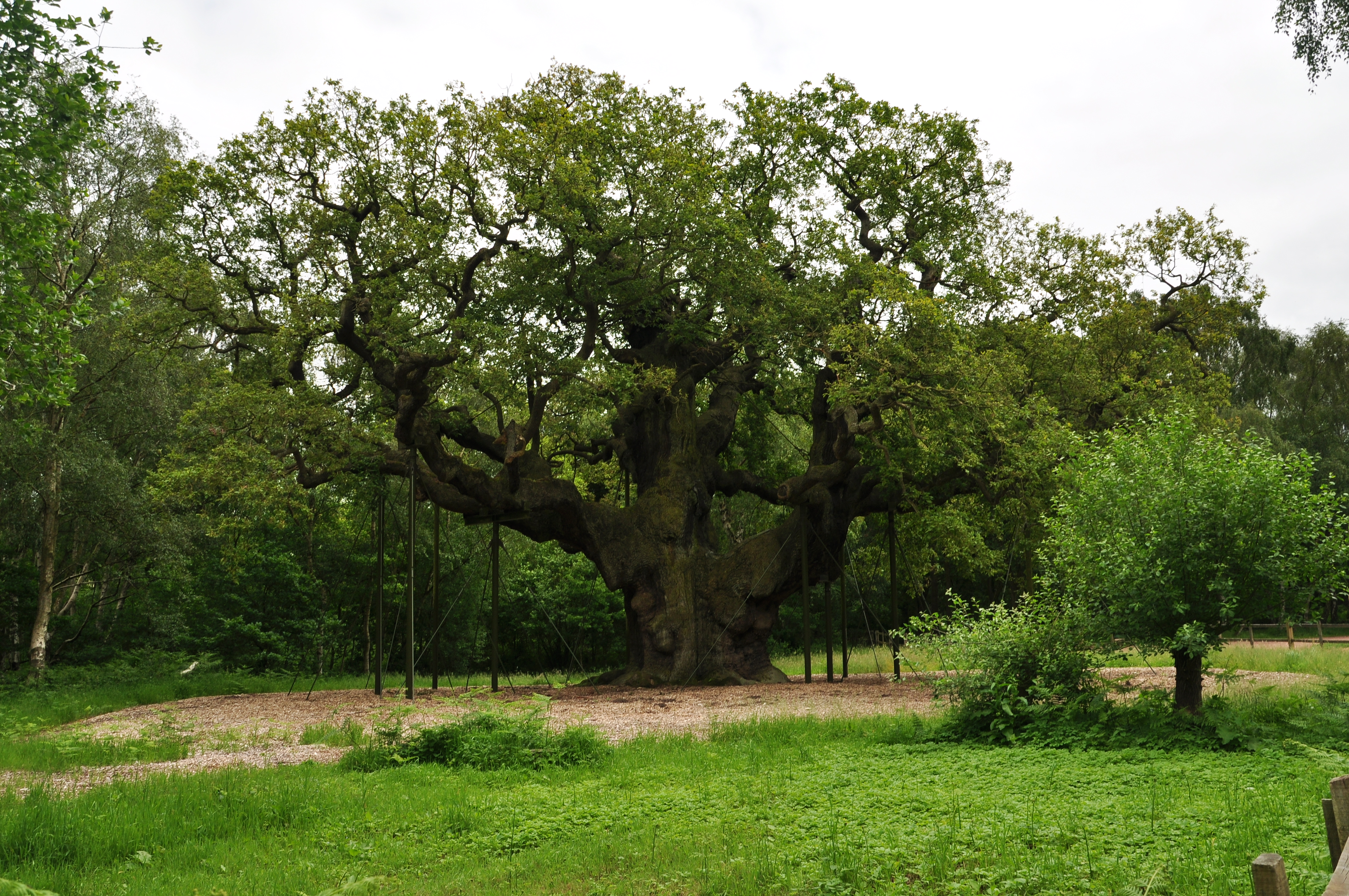
The Major Oak with the support system in place, June 2014

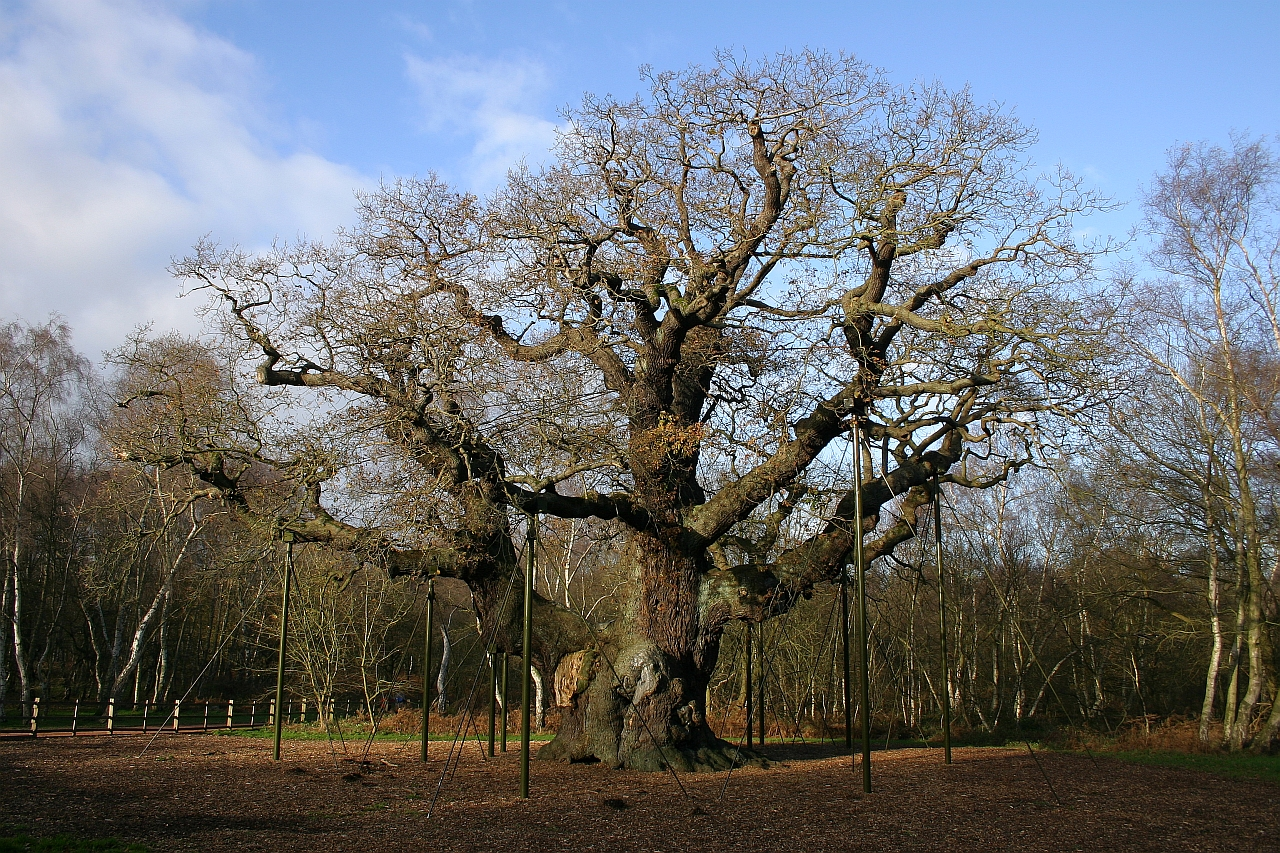
The Major Oak in December 2006

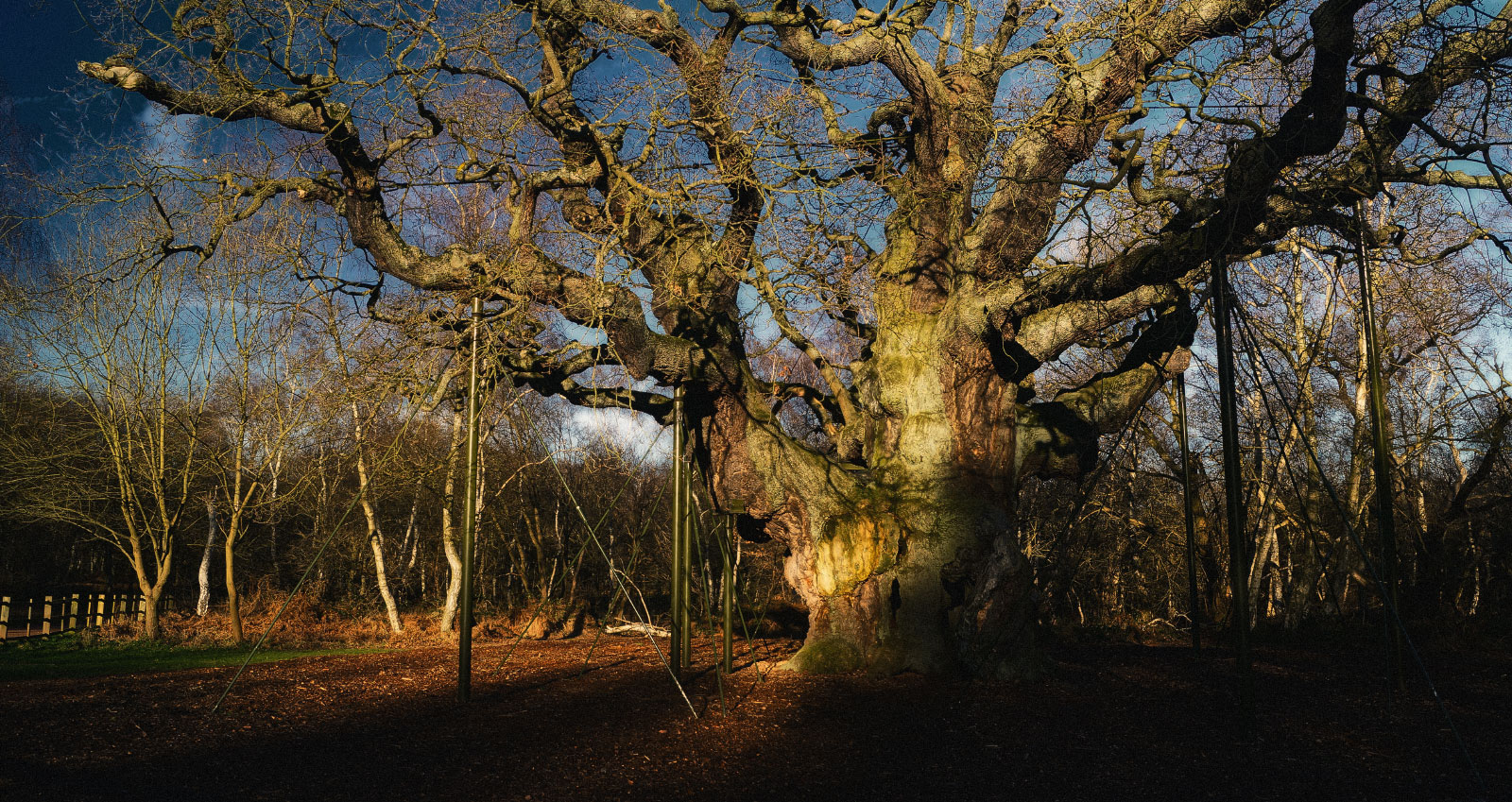
The Major Oak in 2013

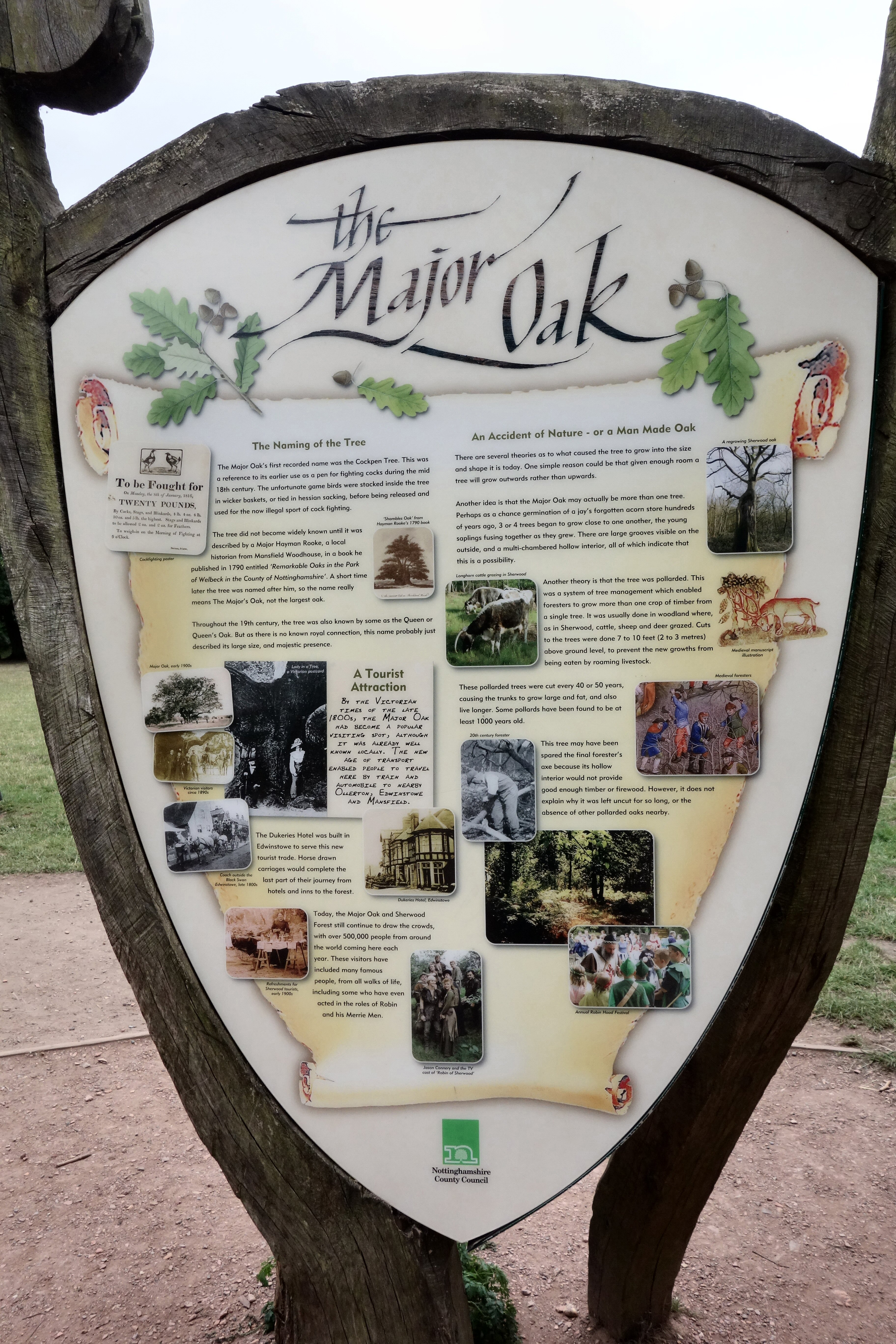
Major Oak information board, 2015

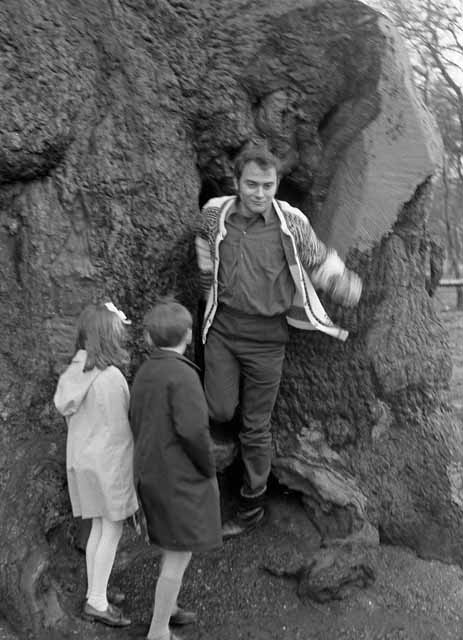
The Major Oak "entrance", May 1972

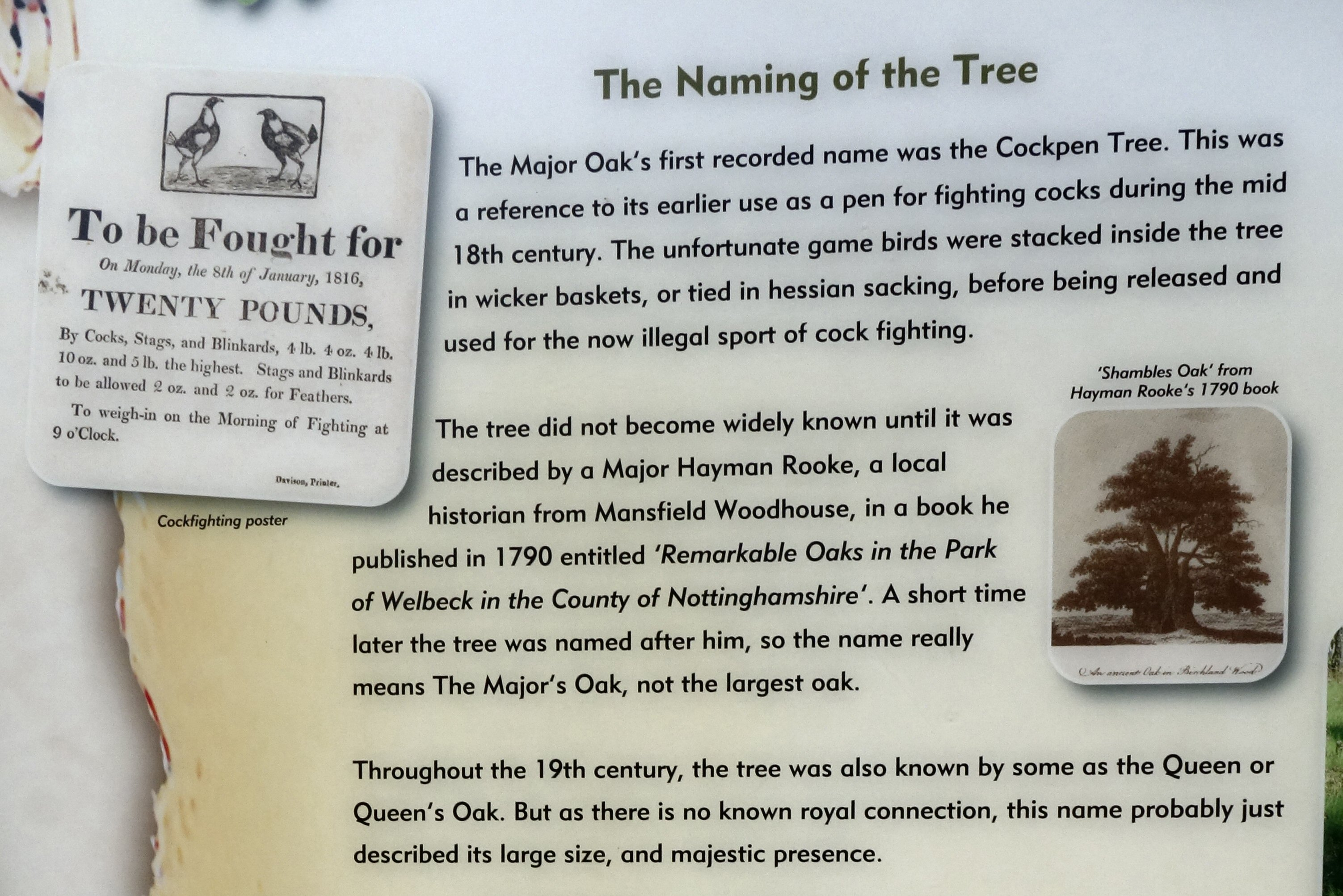
Naming of the tree

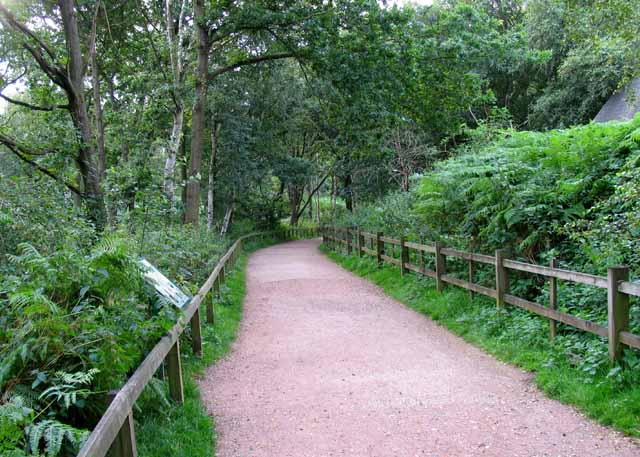
Path towards the Major Oak, 2012

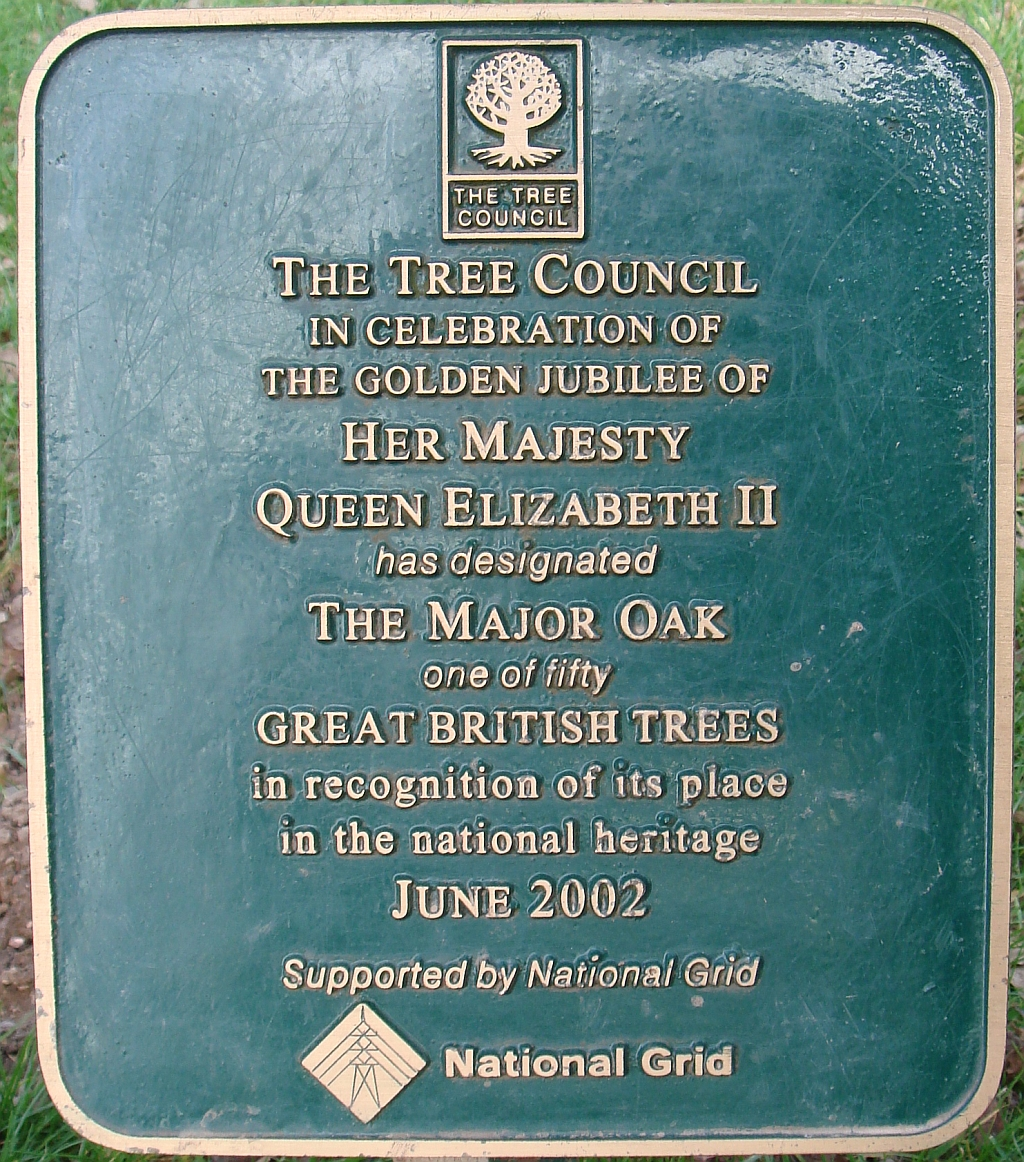
Designated as a Great British Tree

== See also ==
- List of Great British Trees
- List of individual trees
- Robin Hood's Larder, another ancient oak in Sherwood Forest
- Sycamore Gap tree, also known as the "Robin Hood Tree"
