= Day of Archaeology =

Blogging event

The Day of Archaeology is an annual, 24-hour, international online event in which archaeologists and those in related fields write blog posts about their work. It was inspired by the Day of Digital Humanities and, similarly, allows practitioners of many kinds, to document their work informally and 'provide a window into the daily lives of archaeologists from all over the world'. Though it encourages diversity rather than thematic posts, the project has some similarities to Blog Action Day.

== Overview ==
The first event took place on 27 July 2011. The event is organised by a voluntary committee of archaeologists based in the United Kingdom, United States of America and Spain. The main site runs a customised WordPress content management system and the event is promoted through Twitter and Facebook pages (see External links).

The project is supported by several British archaeological and academic organisations: server space is provided on the Portable Antiquities Scheme servers and long-term digital preservation is provided by the Archaeology Data Service. L-P Archaeology and the UCL Centre for Digital Humanities provide technical and management advice. In 2011 and 2013 the event was timed to coincide with the Festival of British Archaeology.

The project covers any form of work that could be considered archaeology and encourages contributions from any level of professionalism.

== External coverage ==
Several archaeologists have blogged about the project in official and personal capacities and the project committee wrote posts on various other sites, notably the Society for Historical Archaeology and the British Museum.

After the 2011 event a preliminary data mining analysis was conducted. Similarly, after the 2014 event a topic modelling and keyword analysis was published.

The Day of Archaeology project was nominated for a British Archaeology Award in July 2011 in the 'Best Representation of Archaeology in the Media' category and was highly commended.

== Event summaries ==
Year	Date	Number of participants	Number of countries	Number of posts
2013	26 July	1067	Not known	329
2012	29 June	over 300	Not known	343
2011	27 July	over 400	Not known	429
2014	11 July			
2015	24 July			

Data sources:
