= Michael Lewis (disambiguation) =

Michael Lewis (born 1960) is an American non-fiction author and financial journalist.

Michael, Mike or variants may also refer to:

== Arts and entertainment ==
- Michael J. Lewis (composer) (born 1939), British composer of film music
- Mike Lewis (musician) (born 1977), Welsh guitarist for Lostprophets
- Mike Lewis (model) (born 1981), Japan-born, Indonesian model
- Michael Lewis (model) (born 1987), Israeli basketball player, actor and fashion model
- Michael Lewis (musician), American saxophonist
- Michael J. Lewis (architecture critic), American art historian and architecture critic

== Sports ==
=== American football ===
- Mike Lewis (American football) (1949–2024), American football defensive lineman
- Michael Lewis (wide receiver) (born 1971), American football wide receiver and punt returner
- Michael Lewis (safety) (born 1980), American football strong safety
- Mike Lewis (arena football) (born 1984), American football defensive end

=== Other sports ===
- Mike Lewis (basketball) (born 1946), American basketball player
- Mickey Lewis (1965–2021), English footballer
- Michael Lewis (cyclist) (born 1967), Belizean racing cyclist
- Mick Lewis (born 1974), Australian cricketer
- Michael Lewis (basketball coach) (born 1977), American basketball coach
- Mike Lewis (rower) (born 1981), Canadian rower
- Michael James Lewis (born 1990), American racing driver
- Mikey Lewis (born 2001), English rugby league player

== Others ==
- Michael Lewis (1570s MP) (fl. 1571–1572), English politician representing Stamford (UK Parliament constituency)
- Michael Lewis (naval historian) (1890–1970), British naval historian
- Michael Lewis (psychologist) (born 1937), American developmental psychologist
- Michael Lewis (bishop) (born 1953), English bishop of the Anglican Diocese of Cyprus and the Gulf
- Michael Lewis (businessman) (born 1959), South African-born British businessman
- Michael V. Lewis (born 1963), American CEO and businessman
- Michael Lewis (philosopher) (born 1977), British philosopher
- Michael Lewis (archaeologist), British archaeologist
