= King John's Palace =

Grade II listed building in England

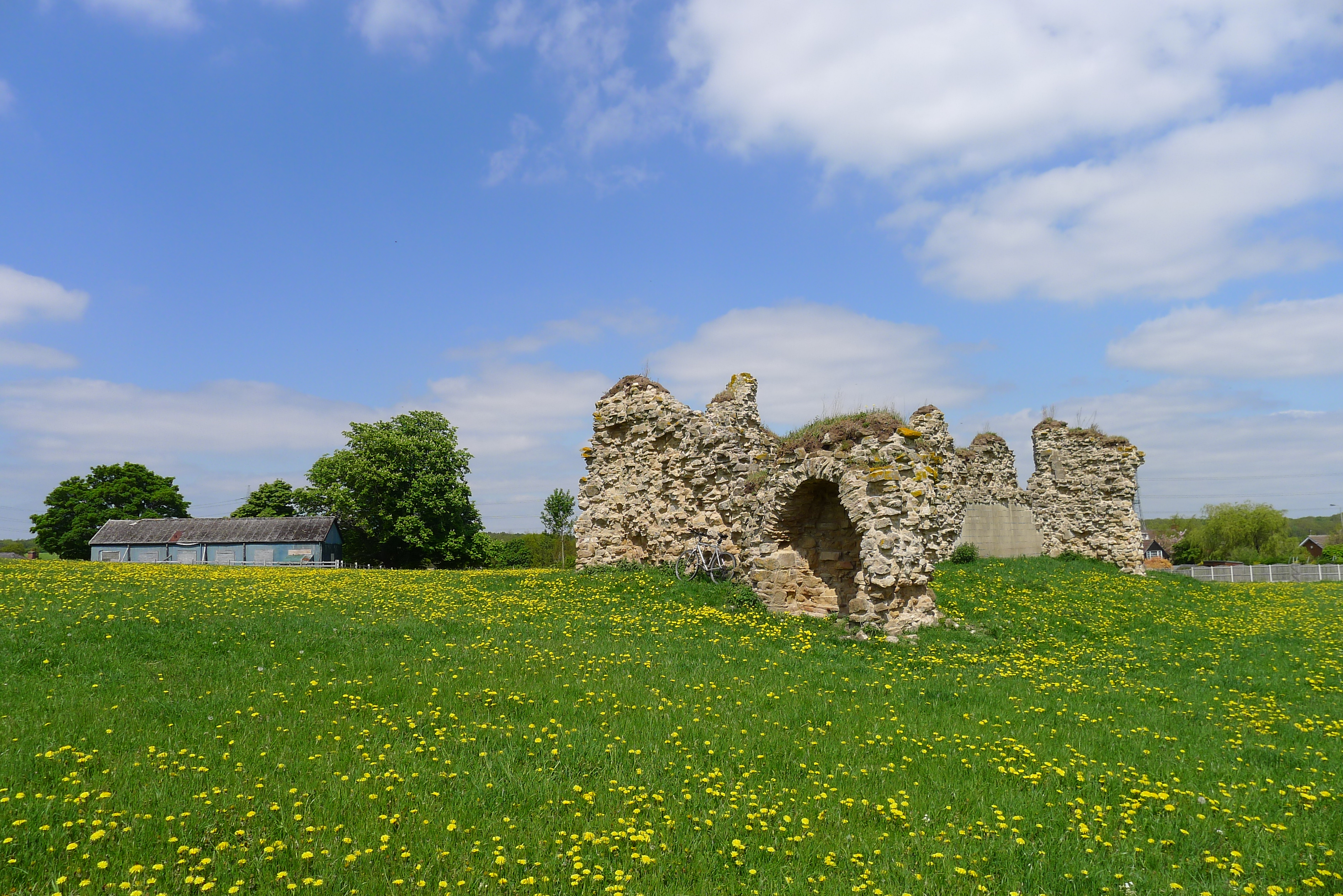
- A view of the ruin

- Location of King John's Palace in Nottinghamshire
- 53°10′35.76″N 1°5′55.32″W
- Location: Main Road Kings Clipstone, Nottinghamshire, England NG21 9BT

Site notes
- Architectural style: Romanesque
- Governing body

Scheduled monument
- Official name: King Johns Palace
- Designated: 5 August 1954
- Reference no.: 1003481

King John's Palace is the remains of a former medieval royal residence in Kings Clipstone, north-west Nottinghamshire. The name "King John's Palace" has been used since the 18th century; prior to that the site was known as the "King's Houses". It is not known how or when the building became associated with King John as he only spent a total of nine days here. The site is standing on private land within Sherwood Forest.

== Early History ==
The earliest reference to the King's Houses dates back to 1164 during the reign of Henry II (1154–1189). The first period of significant building took place between 1176 and 1180, when Henry ordered £500 to be spent, and also created a deer park at Clipstone. Hunting game was the preserve of the aristocracy and deer parks provided a form of recreation, foodstuffs for feasting and an arena for crucial political and economic deals to be made. In 1194 Richard I arranged a meeting with William, King of Scots at Clipstone, and in 1290, Edward I convened Parliament here.Queen Eleanor the first wife of Edward I was taken ill at the palace and moved to Harby, Nottinghamshire.

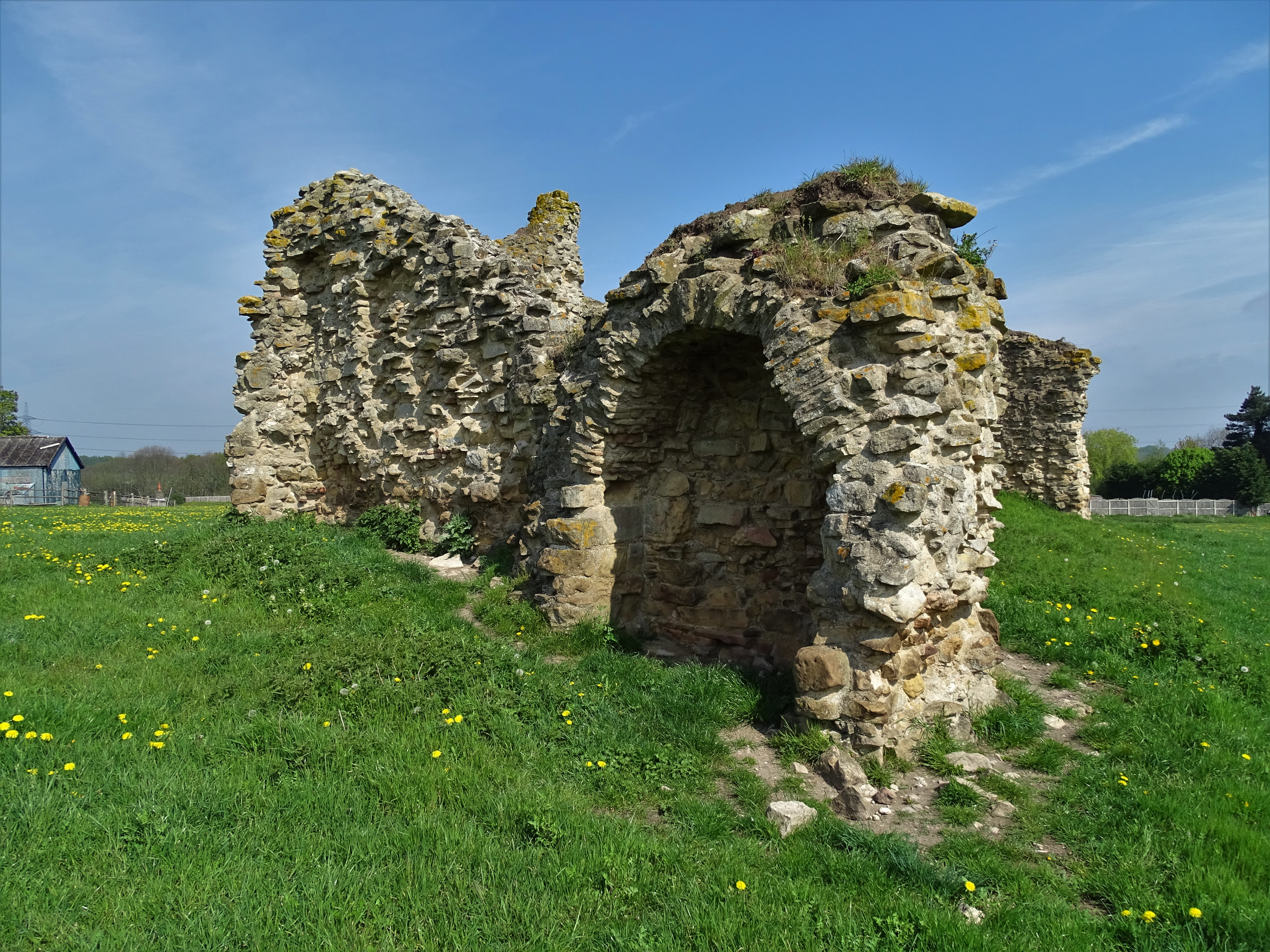
King John’s Palace

The King's Houses were once very well-appointed. The ruins that are visible today are the remains of a Romanesque chamber dating from around 1180. The stone chamber was accessed through a large, buttressed central doorway and had a timber upper floor which allowed views over the deer park from ornately carved windows. However, the chamber was only a small part of a large, multiphased complex of buildings which is known to have existed at Clipstone from documents, geophysical survey and archaeological excavation. These included a gatehouse, tower, individual hall and chambers for the King and Queen, several chapels, kitchens, stables for 200 horses, and lodgings for many royal retainers. There was also a Great Pond which provided 100 pike and 1600 roach during Edward II's visit in December 1315.

Clipstone remained an important royal centre until the late fifteenth century when the English monarchy began to focus on other residences. In 1525 it was said of the King's Houses that "ther is great dekay & ruyne in stone-work tymber lede and plaster". By the mid-18th century, the site had been reduced to the ruin that stands today.

King John's Palace was consolidated during 2009 by Paul Mendham Stonemasons during a conservation project funded by English Heritage and Nottinghamshire County Council. The site is the focus of an ongoing archaeological project by Andy Gaunt of Mercian Archaeological Services and the buildings archaeologist James Wright.

== The King's Houses ==
=== Establishment of the palace and deer park ===
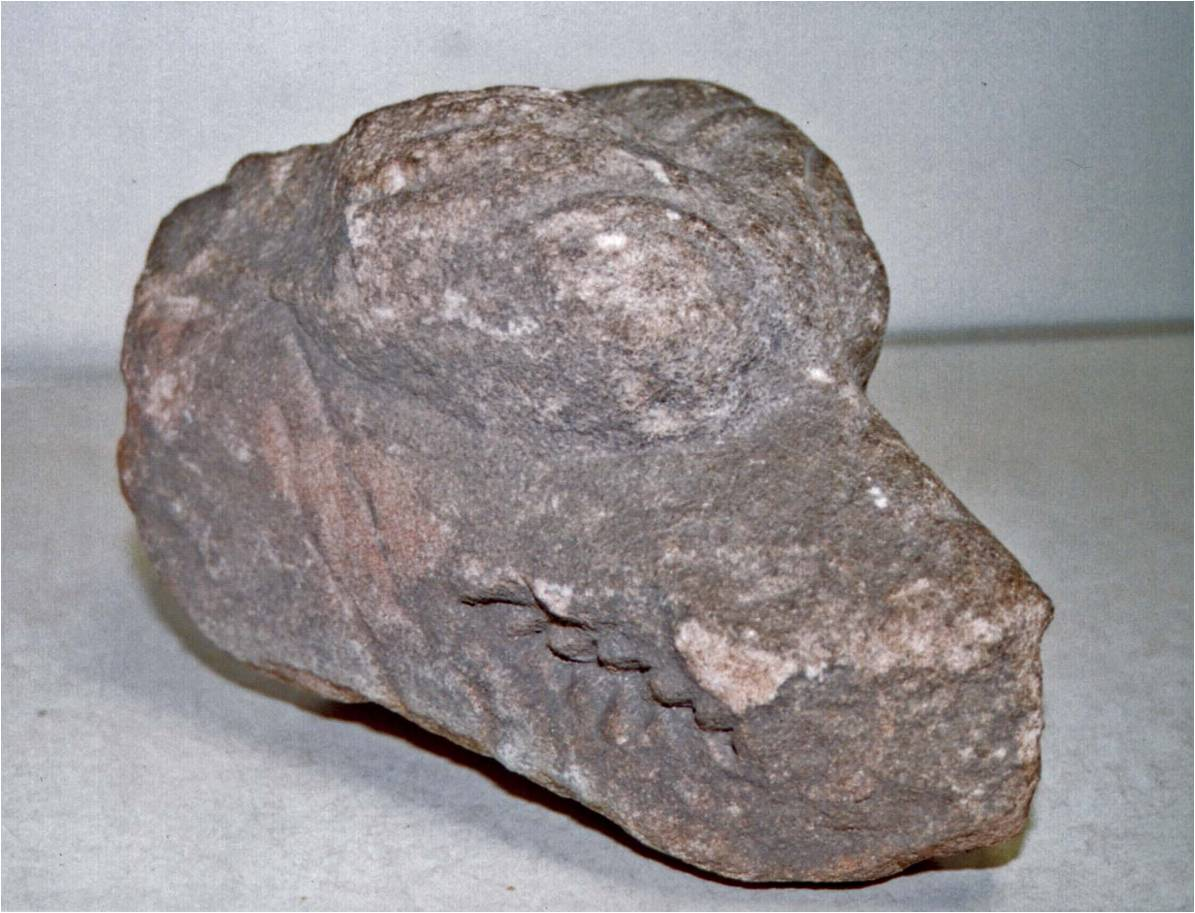
Medieval beast-head discovered at the site in 1956

The establishment of the King's Houses was linked to Clipstone's location in the heart of the royal forest of Sherwood. In the Middle Ages, a forest was a defined geographic area subject to the forest law, which had been brought to England by the Normans. The law protected beasts of the chase, primarily deer, for the king. It also protected the woodland that formed their habitat. Forest law was enforced over the land regardless of who owned it. In the 13th century the forest stretched from the River Trent in the south to the River Meden in the north, and from Wellow in the east to Sutton-in-Ashfield to the west. In the 12th century it may have covered all of Nottinghamshire north and west of the Trent. A reference to the forest in Nottinghamshire made in 1155–56 early in the reign of Henry II (1154–1189) points to there being a forest in the reign of Henry I (1100–1135), however a dispute over the keepership of the forest in the early 13th century suggests a forest in Nottinghamshire dating back to the reign of William I. Sherwood Forest was therefore well established by 1164.

Wright is of the opinion that the extant building dates from the period of Henry II given that it bears several Romanesque architectural features which were phased out by the end of the 12th century.

=== History of the King's Houses and Clipstone Park ===
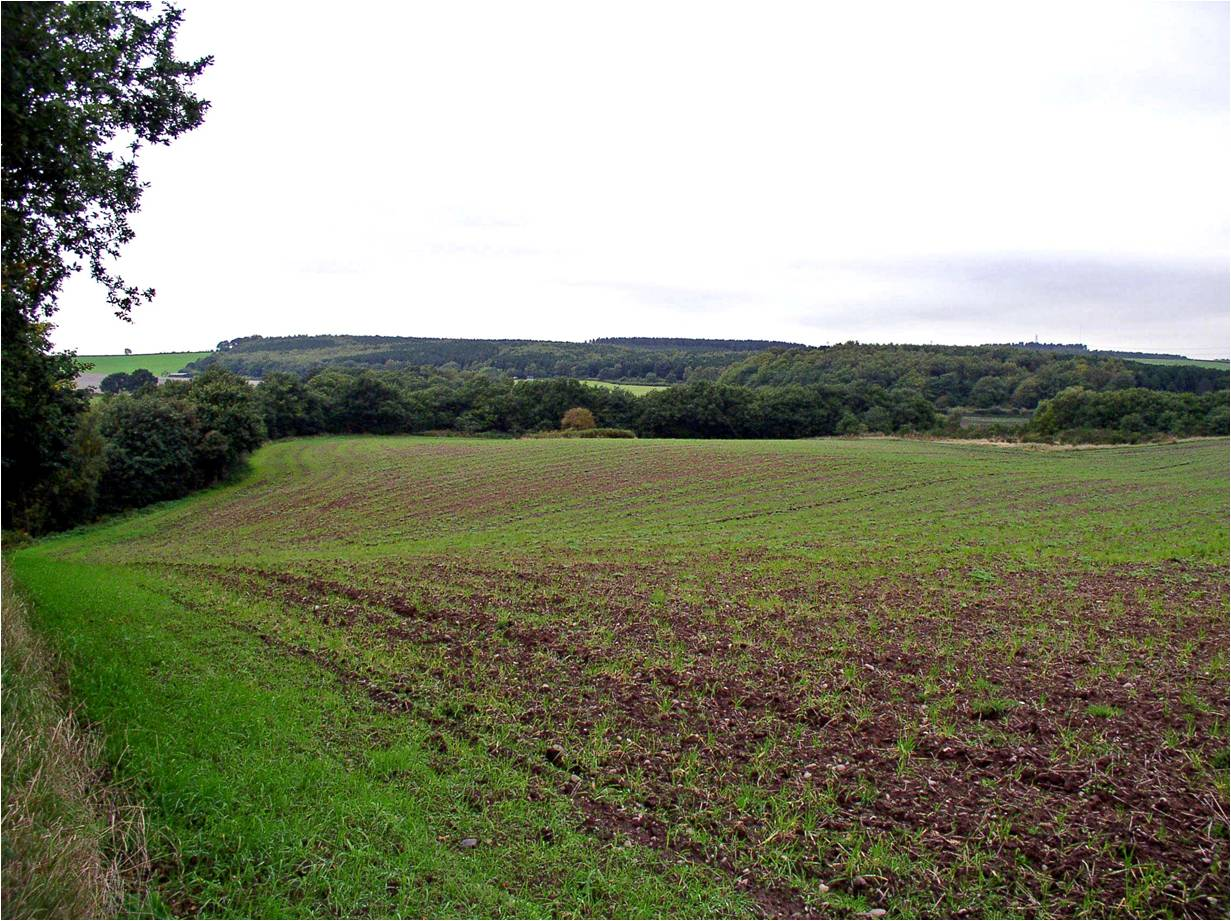
The site of Clipstone Peel

Clipstone became a favoured residence of the monarchy for over two hundred years. The historian David Crook listed the following visits: Henry II in 1181 and 1185, Richard I in 1194, John in 1200, 1201, 1205, 1210 and 1215, Henry III in 1244, 1251 and 1255, Edward I in 1279, 1280, 1284, 1290 and 1300, Edward II in 1307, 1315, 1316, 1317, 1318 and 1320, Edward III in 1327, 1328, 1330, 1331, 1332, 1334, 1335, 1345 and 1363, and Richard II in 1387 and 1393 Such visits could be brief, such as John's overnight stay on 19 March 1200.

The reign of King John saw the endowment of the chapel of St Edwin in 1205. He is also said to have held a parliament at the nearby Parliament Oak during one of his visits.

During the reigns of Edward II and Edward III an extension to the park led to petitions lodged by the men of Clipstone, Warsop and Mansfield Woodhouse over their loss of their rights to husbote (timber for building), haybote (timber for hedging), collection of ferns and leaves (for compost and manure) as well as pastureland.

There are only three recorded visits to the King's Houses by Henry III. Philip Rahtz attributes the standing ruin to this phase of building, however J. Wright considers that the presence of Romanesque features associated with the extant structure which have been identified subsequent to Rahtz's fieldwork may push back the dating to Henry II's construction of 1176–80.

In 1282, Edward I ordered the construction of a stable capable of accommodating 200 horses, and John Steane is of the opinion that it was intended to provide for the entire entourage of the Household, or possibly even act as a royal stud.

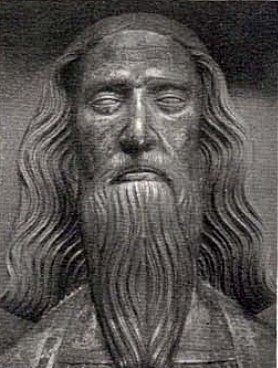
Monument to Edward III of England in Westminster Abbey

Edward II constructed a peel at the castle, which has been viewed by Crook in the light of the pressures on the need for more agricultural land during the early 14th century coupled with the political background of Edward I's problems with Scotland and internally with Thomas, 2nd Earl of Lancaster.

The early years of Edward III's reign saw a number of visits to the palace and the subsequent petitions by the local communities led to the reversal of most of Edward II's changes to the park. Edward III also maintained the administration of the deer park. In 1340 Robert de Mauley was granted custody of the manor and park. In 1341 the men of Clipstone and Warsop were granted permission to utilise the woodland resources within the park.

Colvin describes work in the late 1340s: "Works carried out in 1348-9 included the rebuilding of the knight's chamber and the repair of the great hall, the king's kitchen, the queen's hall, the king's kitchen, the queen's kitchen, the great chamber, Rosamund's Chamber, Robert de Mauley's Chamber, the treasurer's chamber, the chamber of Lionel the king's son, the great chapel, the chapel next to the king's chamber, the king's long stable, and the great gateway. The knight's chamber was a timber-framed building standing on a 'groundwall' of stone, but the more important buildings were of stone. The roofing material was Mansfield slate. In 1360-3 over £140 were spent on general repairs to the hall, king's chamber, Earl of March's chamber, pantry, buttery, gateway and other buildings, including the chapel of St. Edwin at Birkland which was served by the chaplain of Clipstone. Further considerable repairs were carried out between 1367 and 1375 by William Elmeley, who in 1360 had been appointed clerk of the works at the manor of Clipstone and the lodge of Bestwood."

The Patent Rolls of this period also help to populate the King's Houses with recognisable historical characters. Robert de Mauley is almost certainly Robert de Morley, 2nd Baron Rodyn, who fought at the battles of Boroughbridge, Halidon Hill, Sluys (where he was captain of the English flagship) and Crecy. De Morley finished his career as Constable of the Tower of London between 1355 and 1359.

A map of Sherwood Forest dating to c.1400 survives in the archive at Belvoir Castle, Leicestershire, and shows Clipstone Park as a clearly defined emparked area circled by a pale fence. There are several place names marked relating to the medieval infrastructure such as "ye pele" (Clipston Peel), "Clipston ye dam" (the dam at the head of the Great Pond) and Clipston Parke; and the River Maun is shown flowing through the park.

The manor passed to George, Duke of Clarence, until his execution in 1478 when once again Clipstone reverted to the crown.

=== Decline ===
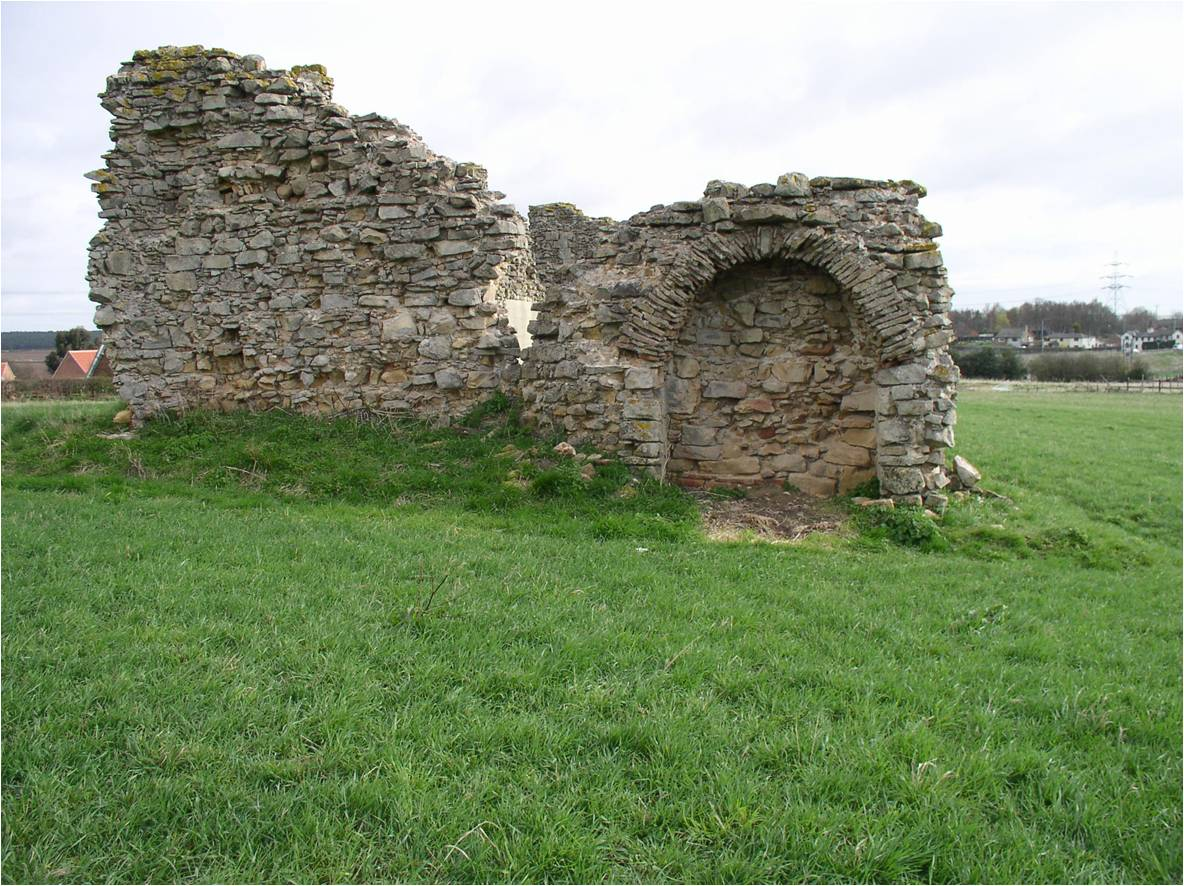
South-west elevation of King Johns Palace, Nottinghamshire displaying the Romanesque recessed arch

The decline of royal interest in the King's Houses throughout the 15th century fits an overall national pattern. Steane has pointed out that the residences of the monarchy in the later Middle Ages focussed on south-east England. Additionally the numbers of palaces and castles under direct royal control dwindled, and as the size of the Household increased from c.120 in the reign of Henry I to 800 under Henry VI fewer but more grandiose palaces were the preference.

A survey of "the dekayes of the manner of Clippeston" dated to 1525 records that:

"First the southeast end of the hie Chamber ther is in great dekay & ruyne in stonework tymber lede and plaster & the gavell ende of the same is flede outwarde so that a part of the rove and of flour of the said Chymber is fallen doune. Also ther was sume tyme begone a stone grees & yet is not fynyshed the which hath been the cause of the Ruyne of the said Chambre. Also the Chappell ther is in dekay and hath no cuverying upon it. Also the kechyn ther was new plasterid and the rof therof wantith poyntyng and amedyng of the slate, also on the said kechyn were ij chymnays begon and not fynishyd."

== The post-Medieval period ==
=== Sale of the estate ===
The manor and park of Clipstone finally passed out of royal ownership for the last time on 11 October 1603 when James I granted it to Charles Blount, Lord Mountjoy. This was promptly sold on to Gilbert Talbot, Earl of Shrewsbury, the following year.

=== William Cavendish ===
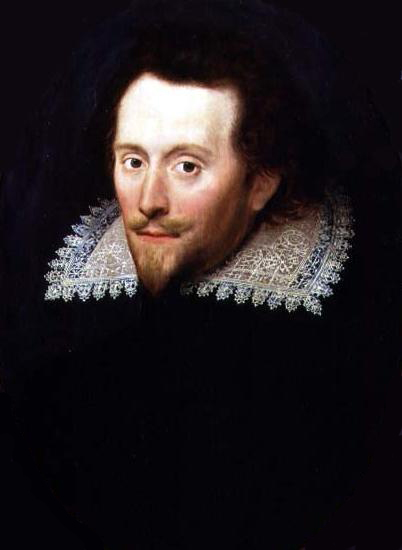
Portrait of William Cavendish, Duke of Newcastle 1592–1676

William Cavendish, Earl of Newcastle, purchased the estate in 1630 and immediately commissioned William Senior "professor of arithmetique, geometrie, astronomie, navigation and dialing" to make a map of his new possession. This map survives as a full colour double folio in the collection of the Welbeck Estate. Much of the surrounding landscape is woodland described as "The Shroges" and "fless-greave wood", interspersed with "Launds" which Gaunt has identified as the survival of an ornamental landscape from the medieval period.

The only other buildings represented on the site are a house to the north-west of the ruin, and a rectangular enclosure to the north which is probably the village pinfold and a property further east along the village street. This latter structure may represent the ruined foundations of the gateway to the palace as it sits in the same location as the modern Brammer Farm House and Maun Cottage both of which contain substantial stone walls over a metre in thickness and of similar make-up to the ruin of King John's Palace. High status stonework was found in the gardens of these properties in 2007. Prior to 1889 Maun Cottage was the Fox & Hounds public house. The earliest public house in King's Clipstone was called The Gate and was recorded in the List of Friendly Societies for 1794. James Cutts was the landlord and was still there in 1813. It is suspected that the name change occurred when Lindley took over from Cutts. Cornelius and then his son, James, and finally his daughter in law, Sarah, continued the tenancy until 1889 when the public house closed its doors for the last time

Clipstone Park was virtually destroyed during the period of the English Civil War and Protectorate. Cavendish supported the Royalist cause and went into exile in 1644, and during his absence the pale fence and trees were used to fuel the Parliamentary war-effort and the deer stocks depleted. On returning from exile in France Margaret, Duchess of Newcastle, estimated the losses at £20,000 and described the scene as she witnessed it in 1665:

"The fences torn down and used in the production of charcoal whilst the park denuded of its great oaks, leaving the deer and other animals no food or shade, so causing their demise."

=== Thoroton and the early antiquarians ===
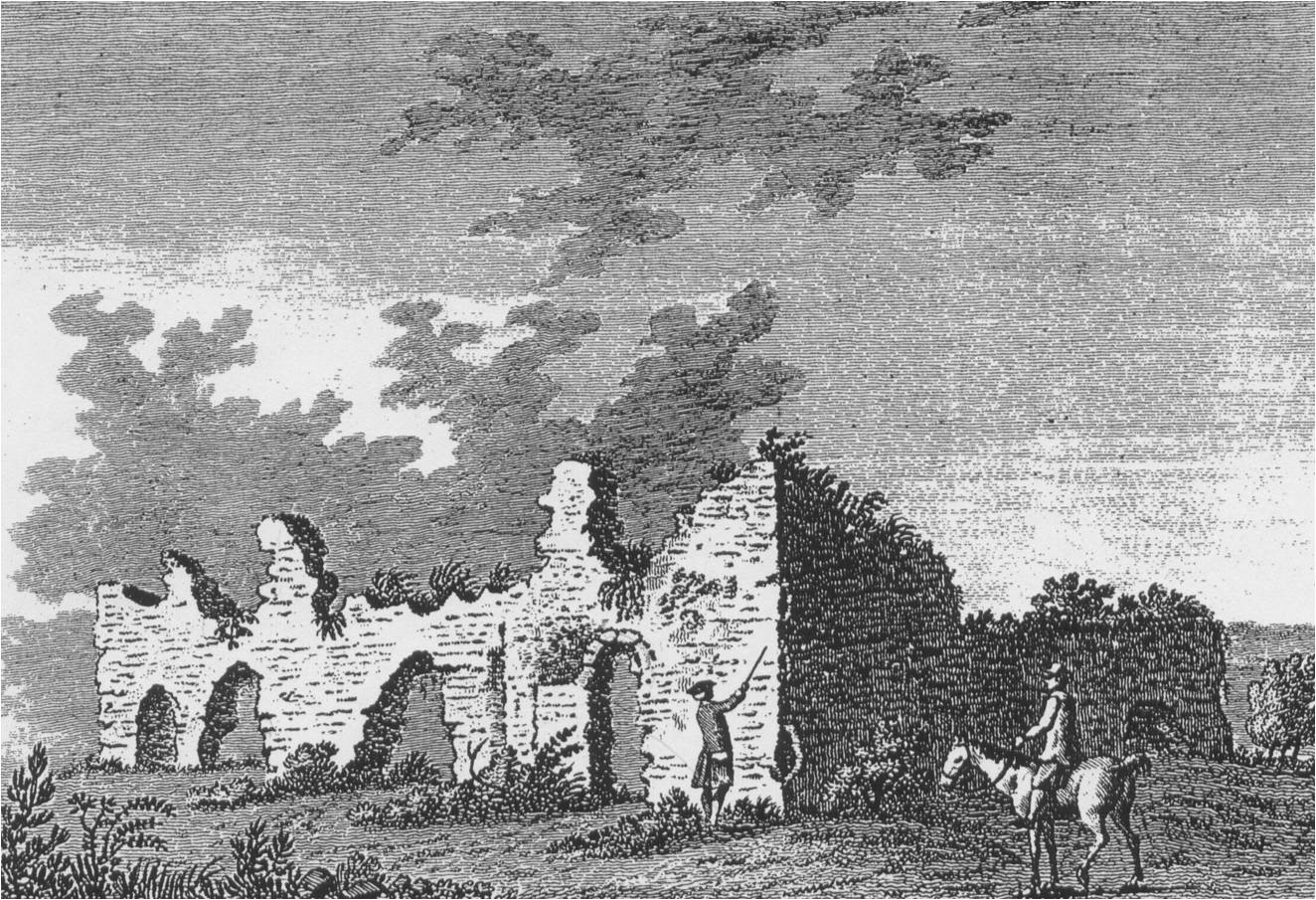
King John's Palace illustrated by Francis Grose in 1772. The site is viewed facing north-east.

The antiquarian Robert Thoroton described a similar scene in 1677, coupled with some architectural detail on the King's Houses:

"There is scarcely any ruins left at all of the king's old house, except a piece of thick Stone Wall, and the Park is also cleared of the Gallant Oaks wherewith it was well furnished before the late Rebellion."

Thoroton's description backs up in words what Senior hints at in his depiction of the King's Houses – that there was only a single structure left on the site by the 17th century. Much of the fabric of the palace complex would have been robbed piecemeal for building projects within the village and wider estate such as Clipstone Hall (founded prior to 1609). Clipstone passed into the ownership of William Bentinck, 2nd Duke of Portland in 1734 on his marriage to Lady Margaret Cavendish-Harley.

Four late 18th century antiquarian images exist of the extant ruins of the King's Houses by Francis Grose (1772), Samuel Hieronymus Grimm (1773), Major Hayman Rooke (1790) and John Throsby (1790).

=== Duke of Portland's flood meadows ===
William Bentinck, 4th Duke of Portland, instigated an irrigation scheme of flood meadows for 7.5 miles (12.1 km) along the course of the River Maun between Carr Bank Wood, Mansfield and the parish boundary between Edwinstowe and Ollerton. The flood meadows were intended to increase the yield of hay to feed flocks of sheep during the winter. The scheme cost almost £40,000 and was notable by the philanthropic nature of the high wages that the Duke offered to pay the construction labourers in a time of high unemployment created by the mechanisation of industry and the recent wars against Napoleon. The flood meadows passed through the heart of Clipstone Park, and the construction of them seems to have taken its toll on the preservation of the King's Houses. Shortly after the completion of the scheme in 1844, White's Trade Directory described the ruins:

"The only part of the palace now remaining stands in a large field close to the village and seems to have been the hall. The foundations have been formerly extensive, with several large vaults, but in 1816 a great part of these were dug up, to be employed in draining, which the Duke of Portland then commenced upon his estate here; and it appears much spoliation was made on the venerable walls, though it is said his Grace had given strict orders to the contrary."

== 20th and 21st centuries ==
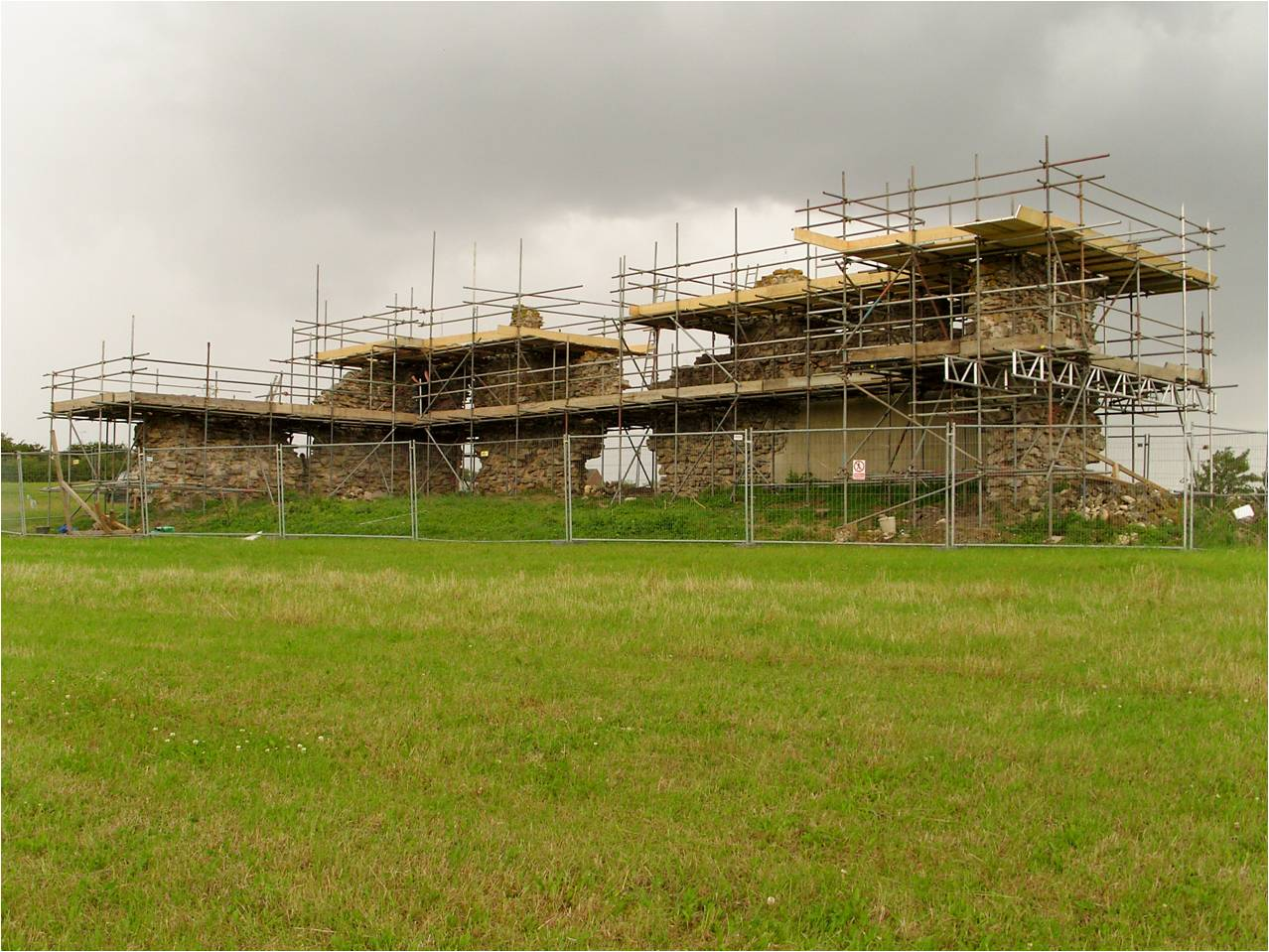
View of King John's Palace, Nottinghamshire facing south-west during conservation work in 2009

The site continued in use as an arable field, with a preserved ruin and was known as Castle Field during the 20th century. It remained in the ownership of the Welbeck Estate until November 1945 when it was purchased by local farmers Fred and Molly Bradley. It has remained in the Bradley family as an arable field (and lately pasture) to the present day.

Conservation work took place on the ruin in 1991 and 2009. A section of the structure was in imminent danger of collapse and was therefore underpinned by pre-cast masonry on a concrete lintel in 1991. The archaeological work prior to underpinning was carried out by Trent and Peak Archaeology; and the construction work was completed by Cranes, West Bridgford, Nottingham. Both elements of the project were overseen by Nottinghamshire County Council.

In 2009 Paul Mendham Stonemasons were instructed by the architect Peter Rogan to complete a full scale consolidation scheme including pointing, grouting, pinning back, under-building, and soft-capping the ruin. The decisions for the scheme of conservation were based on two condition surveys of the ruin by Wright (2005) and Rogan(2008). The work was paid for and overseen jointly by English Heritage and Nottinghamshire County Council.

== Archaeological investigation ==
Broadly there have been three distinct levels of archaeological research into the site. The first of these is evaluation excavations conducted by Philip Rahtz (1956), Trent & Peak Archaeology (1991) and archaeological television programme Time Team (2011). The second of these were geophysical surveys, which took place under Masters (2004) and Gaunt (2010). Masters surveyed limited sections of the site using both magnetometry and resistivity; Gaunt surveyed the entirety of Castlefield using resistivity. In the third level of research the built environment was analysed by Wright in 2004, 2005 and 2007; in the form of a condition survey of the extant ruin and a survey of stonework in a number of properties in the parish. Rogan also produced a second condition survey archive for the ruin in 2008.

Philip Rahtz's 1956 excavation dug over 700 feet (210 m) of trenches and revealed a large medieval complex, spread over around two acres. Relatively little debris from the occupation of the site, however, was found during the work.

The 2004 geophysical survey of the site identified the hidden foundations of walls, "robber trenches" where older walls had been dug up in the past for their valuable stone, and ditches. A possible rectangular enclosure around the lodge was also discovered.

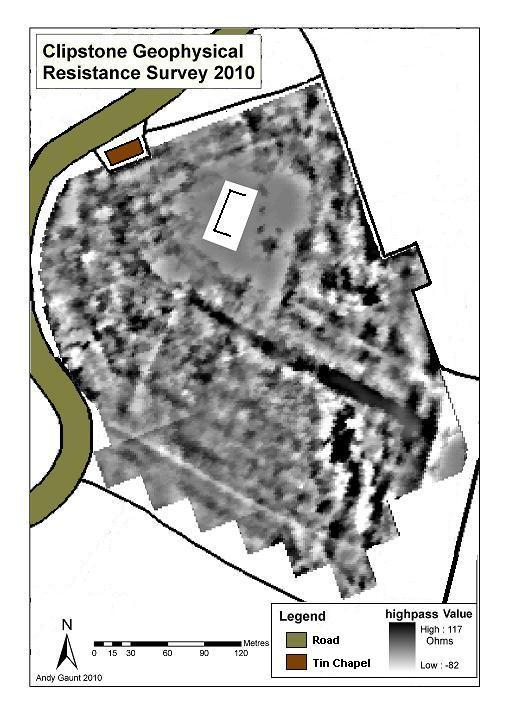
High pass resistivity geophysical survey by Andy Gaunt, 2010

Andy Gaunt's 2010 resistivity survey widened the area selected by Masters to incorporate the entirety of Castlefield and proved many of Masters' findings as well as adding new anomalies to the data-set. Gaunt's work discovered the following anomalies and is summarised from:

1) A large rectangular area and surrounding the monument appears to be a courtyard area, with a number of buildings around the perimeter and a wall or palisade surrounding the possible courtyard.

2) A large high resistance linear anomaly is interpreted as probably a ditch filled with rubble or the remains of a wall, and probably represents the edge of the manorial complex this is corroborated by 17th century mapping evidence which shows the 'Manor Garth' (manor enclosure) being separated at this location from the 'water field' to the west.

3) A large sub-rectangular area probably representing the rubble spread from a substantial building.

4) The location of a road, with drainage ditches either side of a metalled higher resistance surface. One suggestion is that there was a gateway to the site from the road side to the north, which would fit in with this interpretation.

5) Potential robbed out wall foundations perhaps providing a defensive element, or to define the edge of the site to the northeast.

A full condition survey was undertaken in 2004-5 by Nottinghamshire County Council and again in 2008 by Peter Rogan. The 2004-5 survey recorded the condition of the rubble core walls of what appears to have been at least a two-storey building.

Wright also undertook a stone survey in 2007 of a sample of properties within the parish. This is unpublished with the archive held by Nottinghamshire County Council. It revealed the survival of stone fragments of both medieval and post medieval date, with notable high-status examples of carved and chamfered material visible in the garden of Maun Cottage in particular and potentially relating to the gateway of the palace complex. Many of the properties have stone foundations, cellars and walls which may be the result of robbing from the palace.

In April 2011, Channel 4's Time Team filmed an episode of the long running archaeological television programme at King John's Palace. A number of evaluation trenches and areas were opened to test anomalies identified by Gaunt in 2010. The excavation was directed by Professor Mick Aston. On site experts included Paul Blinkhorn and David Budge (pottery), Andy Gaunt (landscape archaeology), David Crook (historian), Dr Naomi Sykes (zooarchaeology), Alex Rowson (researcher), James Wright (buildings) and regular members of Time Team. The project design for the programme was written by Jim Mower and James Wright. A report was generated by Wessex Archaeology.

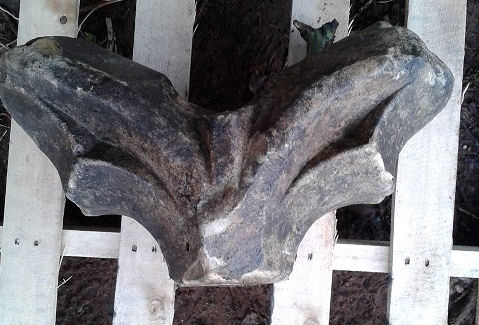
High Status tracery discovered in 2014 by Keith & Andrea Laver, King's Clipstone land owners.

During July 2012 James Wright, Andy Gaunt, Ben Crossley and David Budge opened two evaluation trenches to test whether or not the large 180m long geophysical anomaly identified by Gaunt in 2011 was in fact the palace boundary ditch to the south-west of the site. The excavation discovered a ditch c. 5.5 metres (18 ft) in width associated with the buried soil horizon of an internal bank coupled with archaeologically sealed finds of 13th–14th century pottery has led to the early conclusion that this was indeed the palace boundary. The total area enclosed would have been approximately 7.5 acres (3.0 ha) which compares favourably with the sizes of Knole House (4 acres (1.6 ha)), Clarendon (5 acres (2.0 ha)) and Eltham Palace (8 acres (3.2 ha)) making the King's Houses one of the largest palace sites in England. The evaluation also revealed evidence for a 19th-century sandpit associated with construction work on either the flood meadows or rebuilding of the village by the Duke of Portland.

Mercian Archaeological Services CIC Volunteers and staff excavated 15 test pits in Kings Clipstone, during February 2013.

James Wright undertook a standing building survey of Brammer Farm House and Arundel Cottage during February 2013. The purpose of this survey was to ascertain whether any in situ medieval masonry survived within the two properties. The results suggest that the boundary wall of the King's Houses survives as a spine wall within both properties up to first floor level. There is also evidence for bonded return walls to both north and south as well as a splayed window. There are five phases of development to the cottages with the earliest post-medieval builds being north of the boundary wall into the village street.

Keith & Andrea laver of Sherwood Forest Lodge B&B, King's Clipstone, discovered a section of high-status window tracery in November 2014 in a hedgerow on their land adjacent to King Johns Palace. The section was discovered approximately 100M S.E of King Johns Palace. David Budge of Mercian Archaeological Services CIC states "The architectural fragment recorded on the site of the King's Houses, King's Clipstone, Nottinghamshire appears to be a piece of high-status window tracery made from Mansfield White stone. The glazing channel is clearly visible as are the soffit cusps of trefoil heads. A central mullion rises between the springers."

== Tourism ==
The site is open to visitors subject to advance application to the Bradley family (the landowners) of Waterfield Farm, King's Clipstone.

In the summer of 2009, a permanent interpretation panel was unveiled during an open day at the palace. The panel was written and designed by James Wright and features a reconstruction drawing, by local artist Ray Straw, of the palace complex as it may have appeared in the mid-14th century. The panel is fixed to the 1991 pre-cast masonry wall on the north-west elevation of the ruin.

There is also an annual open day in July at the site known as the "Picnic at the Palace". Details of this are usually logged with the Council For British Archaeology's Festival of British Archaeology webpage.
