= Portable Antiquities Scheme =

Public archaeological programme

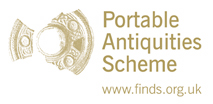
- Abbreviation: PAS
- Purpose: The Portable Antiquities Scheme is a partnership project which records archaeological objects found by the public in order to advance our understanding of the past.
- Headquarters: British Museum, London, UK
- Fields: Archaeology
- Key people: Michael Lewis (Head of Scheme)
- Website: finds.org.uk/about

The Portable Antiquities Scheme (PAS) is a voluntary programme run by the United Kingdom government to record the increasing numbers of small finds of archaeological interest found by members of the public. The scheme began in 1997 and now covers most of England and Wales.

It is primarily focused on private metal detectorists who through their hobby regularly discover artefacts that would otherwise go unrecorded. Members of the public can also report objects they have found and finds of non-metallic objects are also covered by the scheme. Finds that legally constitute treasure are dealt with through the Treasure Act 1996. This however concentrates on precious metals, prehistoric base metal, and finds in association with them. Non-prehistoric base metal and non-metal finds would not be recognised as treasure and therefore be unrecorded. The PAS exists to fill this gap.

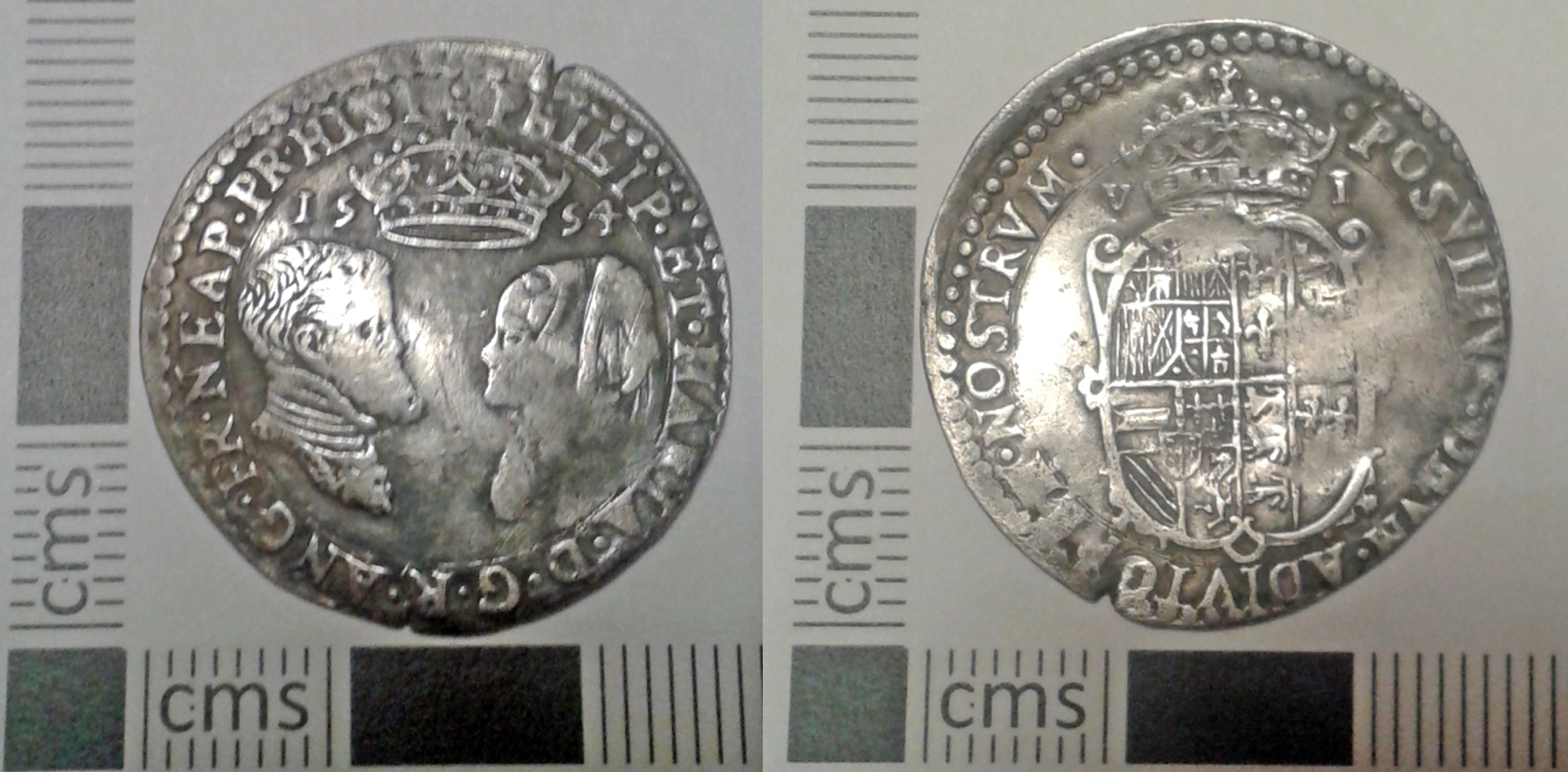
An English sixpence of Philip and Mary, recorded via the scheme (FindID 662681)

The scheme funds the posts of Finds Liaison Officers (FLOs) at county councils or local museums to whom finders can report their objects. The FLO is qualified to examine the find and provide the finder with more information on it. They also record the find, its function, date, material and location and place this information into a database which can be analysed. The information on the findspot can be used to organise more research on the area. Many previously unknown archaeological sites have been identified through the scheme and it has contributed greatly to the level of knowledge of the past. FLOs maintain close links with local metal detecting societies and have contributed to a thaw in relationships between the detectorists and archaeologists who often previously disdained one another.

Finds are photographed, often from multiple angles, and a text description is recorded. The photographs are made available under an open licence.

The find remains the property of the finder or the landowner who are free to dispose of non-treasure finds.

== Other activities ==
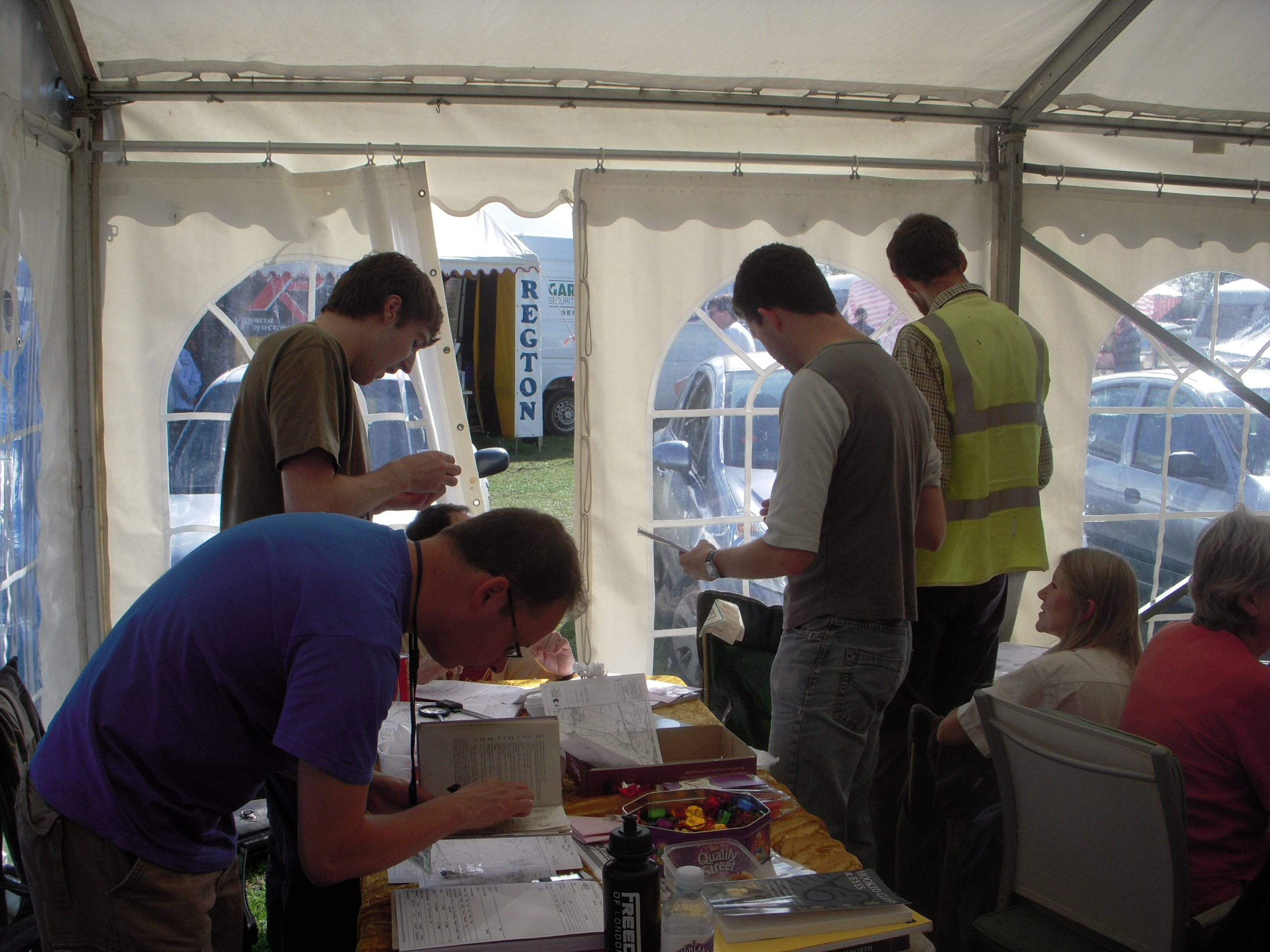
Recording finds at a metal detecting rally, 2010

The PAS engages widely with the professional and amateur archaeological community through conferences, workshops and public activities. It also provides host servers and technical support for the Day of Archaeology.

== History of the programme ==
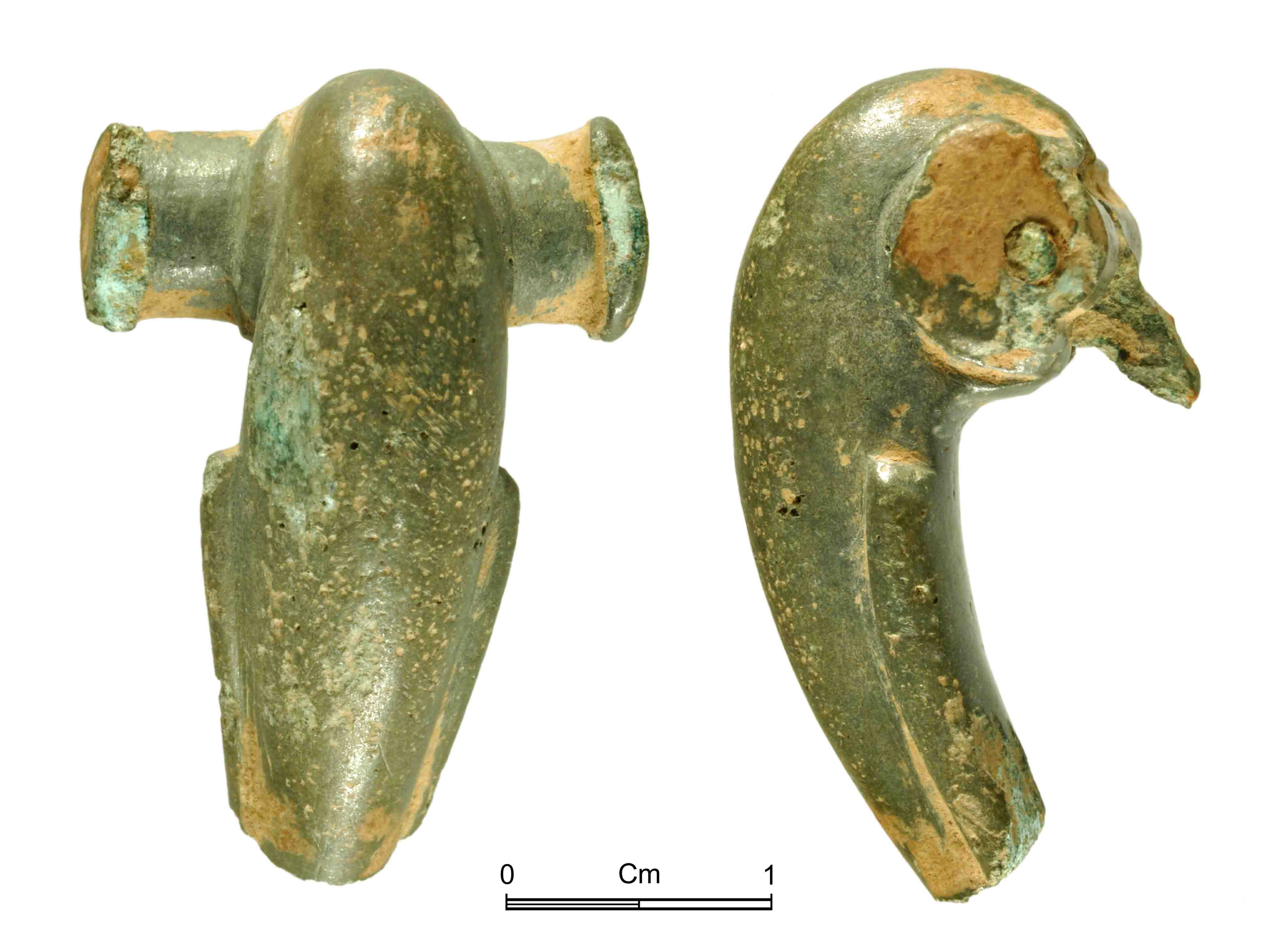
A Roman bow brooch of the Polden Hill type (FindID 662669)

In March 1996, during the run-up to the passing of the new Treasure Act, what was then the Department of National Heritage (DNH) (now the Department for Digital, Culture, Media and Sport (DCMS)) published Portable Antiquities. A discussion document. The aim of this document was to complement the impending Treasure Act, address the issue of non-treasure archaeological finds and to propose solutions for dealing with these.

The general response to the DNH's proposals was that the recording of all archaeological finds was important and that a consistent voluntary scheme to record finds should be established. As a result, in December 1996, the DNH announced that funding would be provided for two years for a programme of six pilot schemes, starting in September 1997. The main aim of the pilot schemes was “to enable an accurate estimate to be made of the resources that would be needed to extend the scheme across the whole of England” (DNH 1997). The essential aim was to advance knowledge of history and archaeology.

The project was ultimately overseen by the DCMS and administered by the Museums and Galleries Commission (later Resource, now Museums, Libraries and Archives Council (MLA))

Expressions of interest in hosting the pilot schemes were then invited and host organisations chosen. The schemes were based in museums and archaeology services in Kent, Norfolk, the West Midlands, North Lincolnshire, the North West England and Yorkshire. A Finds Liaison Officer (FLO) was put in place as part of each pilot scheme. The six posts and schemes were co-ordinated by a further post which was based at, and funded by, the British Museum.

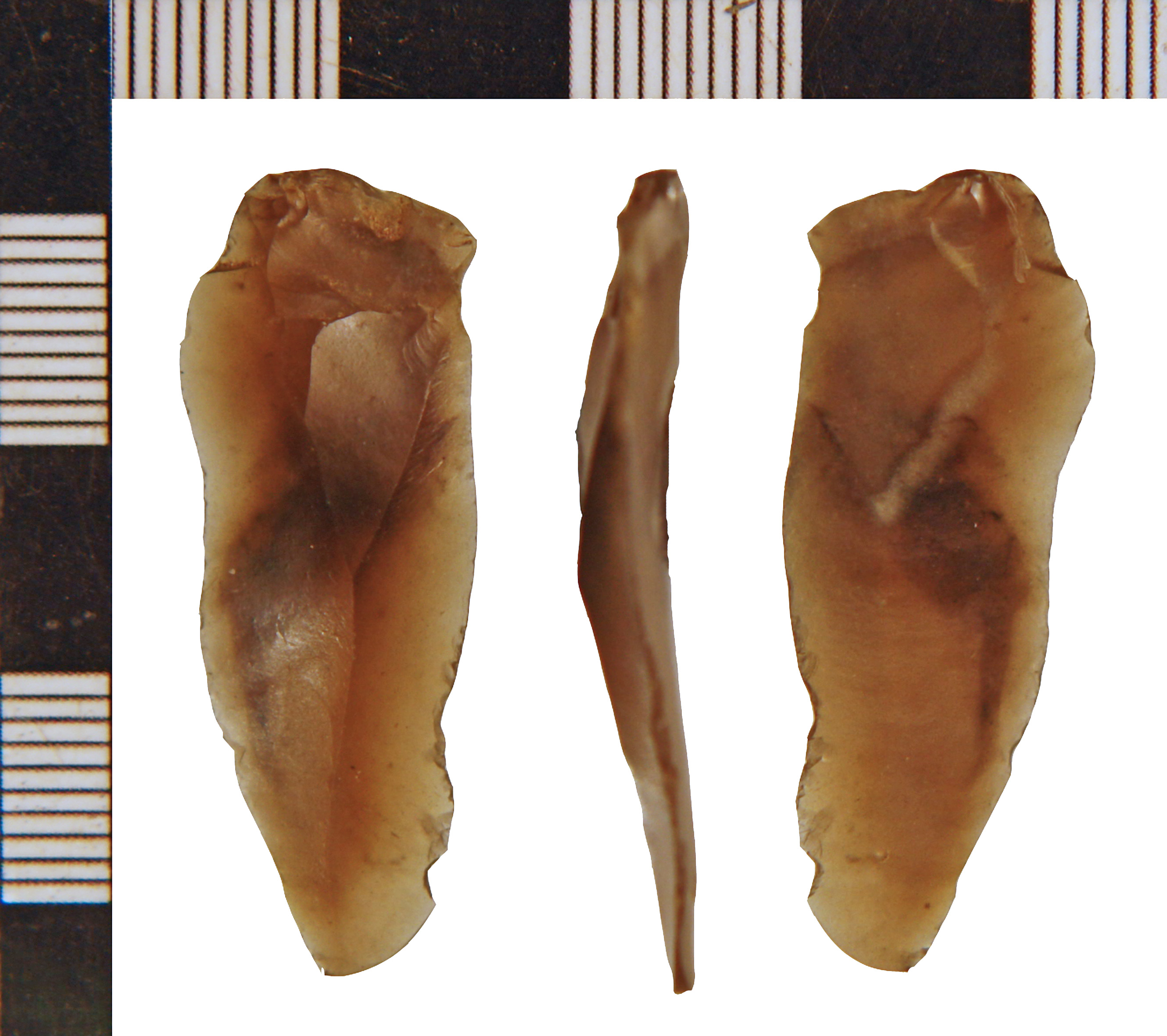
A Mesolithic Knife (FindID 662570)

These six regions were chosen for the pilot schemes in consultation with the Council for British Archaeology (CBA), and were representative of the existing diversity in recording finds systems. Some areas, such as Norfolk, had already established a tradition of recording finds and developed good relationships with finders and in particular among these, metal detectorists. Other areas, such as the North West, did not have systems in place for recording such finds.

A database was devised and put on the web in July 1999 to enable wider access to the information collated by the scheme. During the first year of the pilot scheme, over 13,500 objects were recorded. The scheme was very successful, but further funding was needed to extend the scheme nationally. Therefore, bids were successfully put forward to the Heritage Lottery Fund (HLF) to fund five more FLO posts plus an Outreach Officer post for eighteen months, starting from January–March 1999. The DCMS agreed to fund the existing posts during this period. The five new FLO posts were based in museums and archaeology services in Dorset and Somerset (one post covering two counties), Hampshire, Northamptonshire, Suffolk and Wales. The Outreach Officer was based at the British Museum, working alongside the Co-ordinator.

Shortly after this, further funding was applied for from the HLF to establish a comprehensive national scheme covering the whole of England and Wales. However, before awarding funding to extend the scheme nationally, the HLF required an independent evaluation of the work of the scheme and its impact. This delayed the progression of the application considerably and as an interim measure, while the evaluation was being undertaken, funding was ultimately secured from the DCMS and the HLF for the existing posts until September 2001. The HLF questioned the long-term sustainability of such an ambitious scheme, particularly in consideration of its funding. While a decision was being reached, funding for the existing posts was provided once more by the DCMS as an interim measure until March 2003.

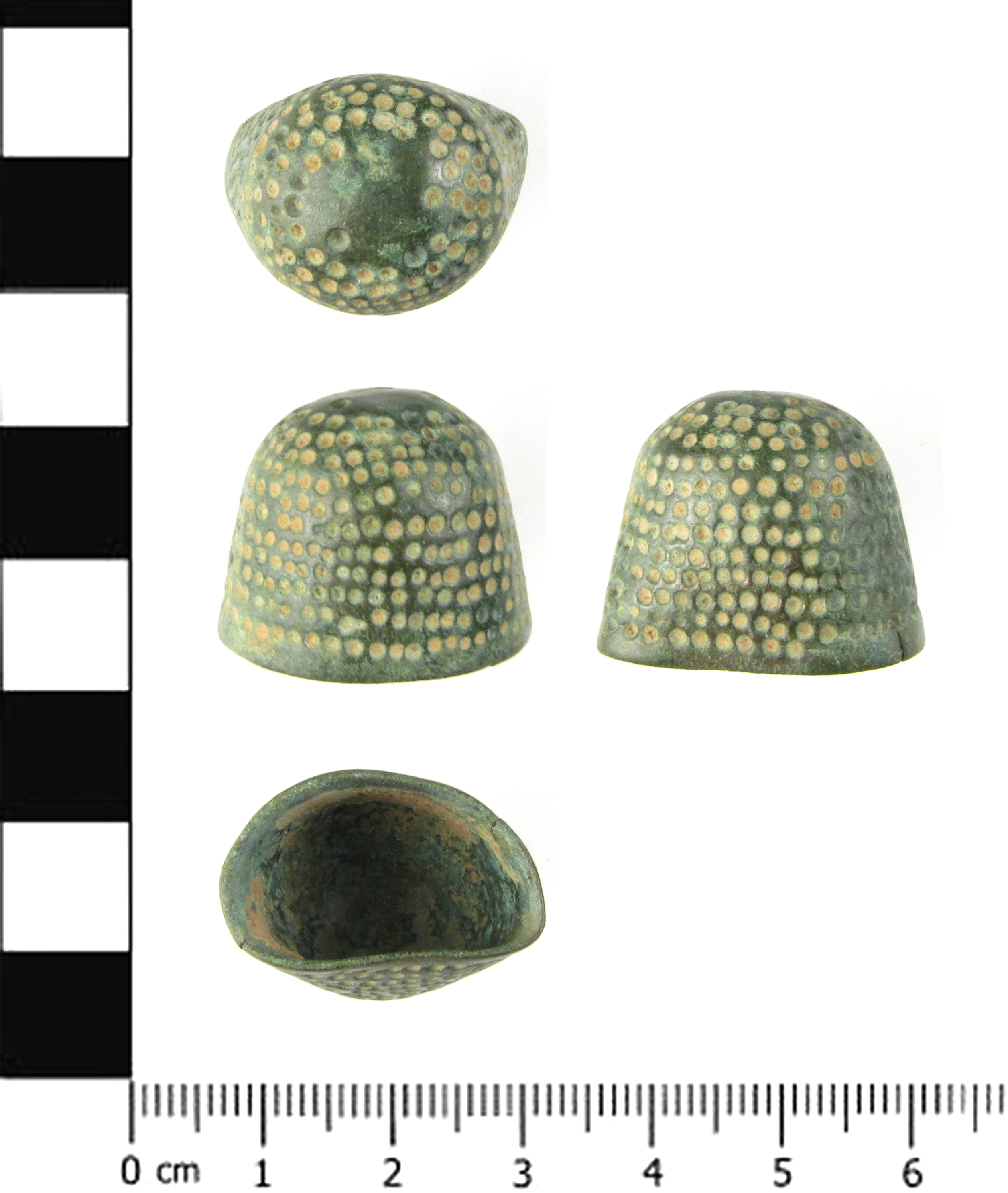
A Medieval thimble (FindID 662823)

However, in April 2002, the HLF decided to support the bid for three years starting in April 2003, bringing about the scheme as we know it today. As from April 2006 the scheme secured full funding from the DCMS, until March 2008. Administration of the scheme changed hands from MLA to the British Museum. Also in April 2006, the Portable Antiquities Scheme central unit became an official department within the BM, the Department of Portable Antiquities & Treasure.

The scheme continues to grow and now consists of a network of:

- thirty-six FLOs
- a part-time illustrator
- six Finds Advisers
- an ICT Adviser
- a Resources Manager (formerly administrator)
- a Deputy Head and
- the Head of Portable Antiquities & Treasure

The work of the scheme is supported by many temporary assistants and volunteers, working with FLOs and Finds Advisers.

A late medieval harness pendant found in Lincolnshire in October 2021 became the 1 millionth record logged on the scheme database.

== Notable people ==
- Roger Bland, Keeper of the Department of Portable Antiquities and Treasure from 2005 to 2013
- Geoff Egan, national finds adviser on early medieval to post-medieval finds
- Helen Geake, Finds Liaison Officer and Finds Adviser
- Sally Worrell, Finds Adviser

== Institutions of the Portable Antiquities Scheme ==
- Oxford University Celtic Coin Index (CCI)
- Royal Institution of Cornwall (CORN) covers the Cornwall region
- Cardiff University's Iron Age and Roman coins of Wales project (IARCW)

== See also ==
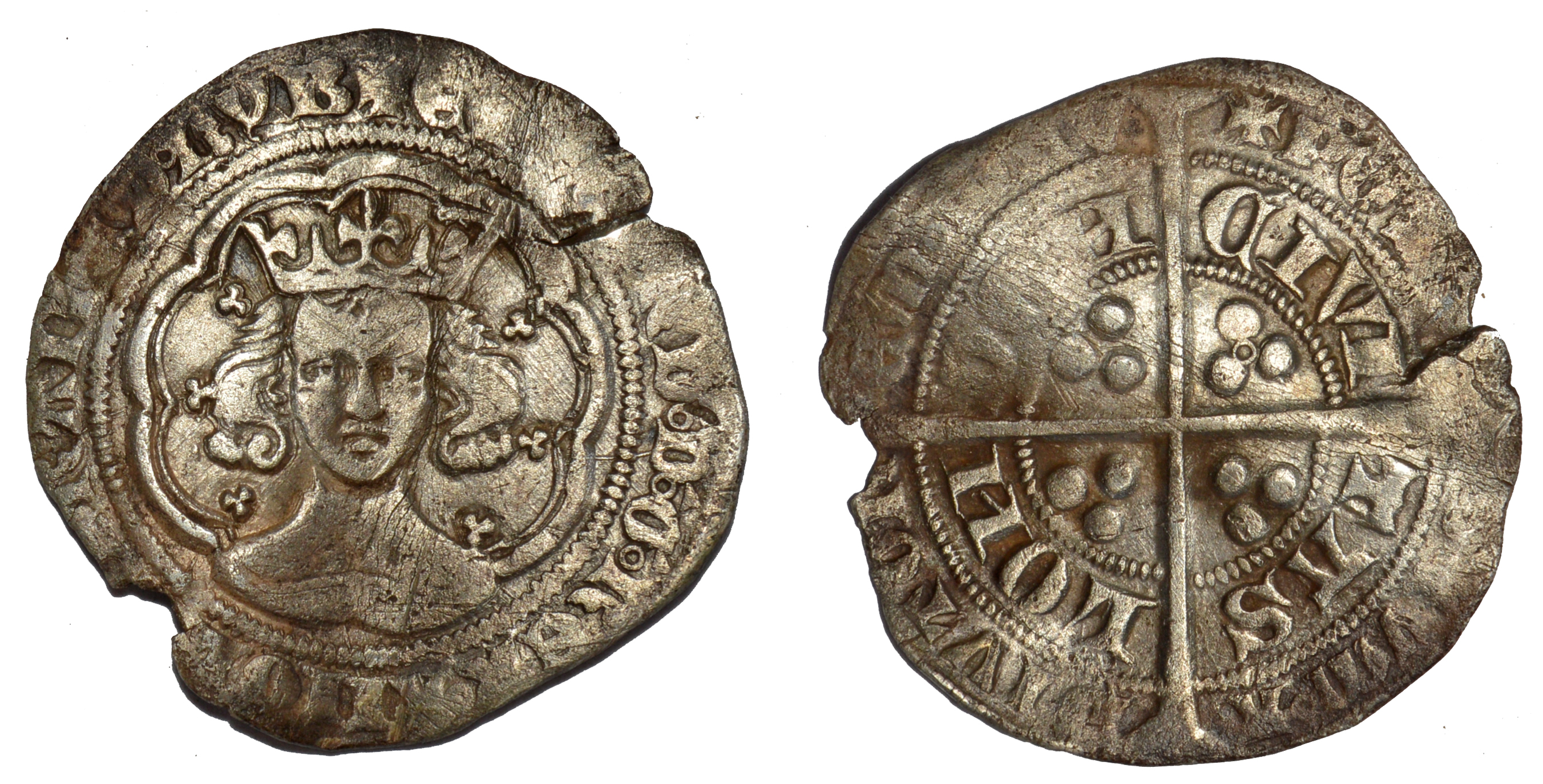
Medieval Groat of Edward III (FindID 662156)

- Vale of York hoard (also known as Harrogate hoard), first reported to the PAS (2007)
- Staffordshire hoard, reported to the PAS. (2009)
- Frome Hoard, reported to the PAS (2010)
- Huntingdon Muddy Hoard, reported to the PAS (2018)
- Ryedale Roman Bronzes, reported to the PAS (2020)
- Crosby Garrett Helmet
- Saltfleetby spindle-whorl, reported to the PAS (2010)
