= Kings Clipstone =

Village in Nottinghamshire, England

Coordinates: 53°10′37″N 1°06′05″W

- Village and Civil parish
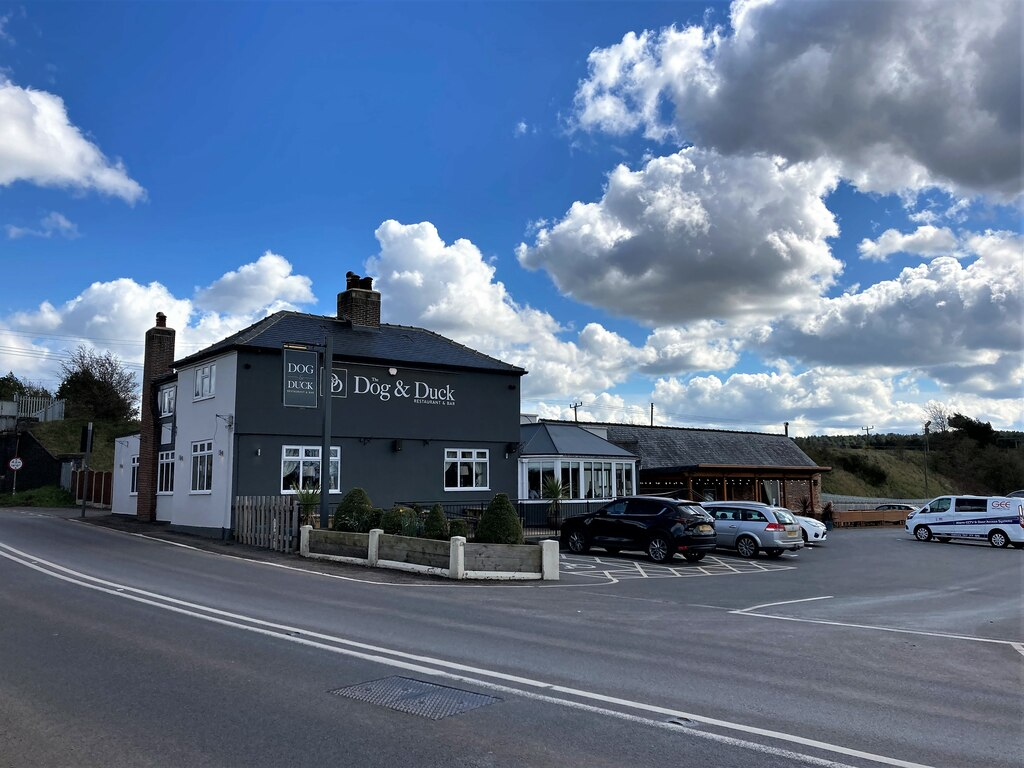
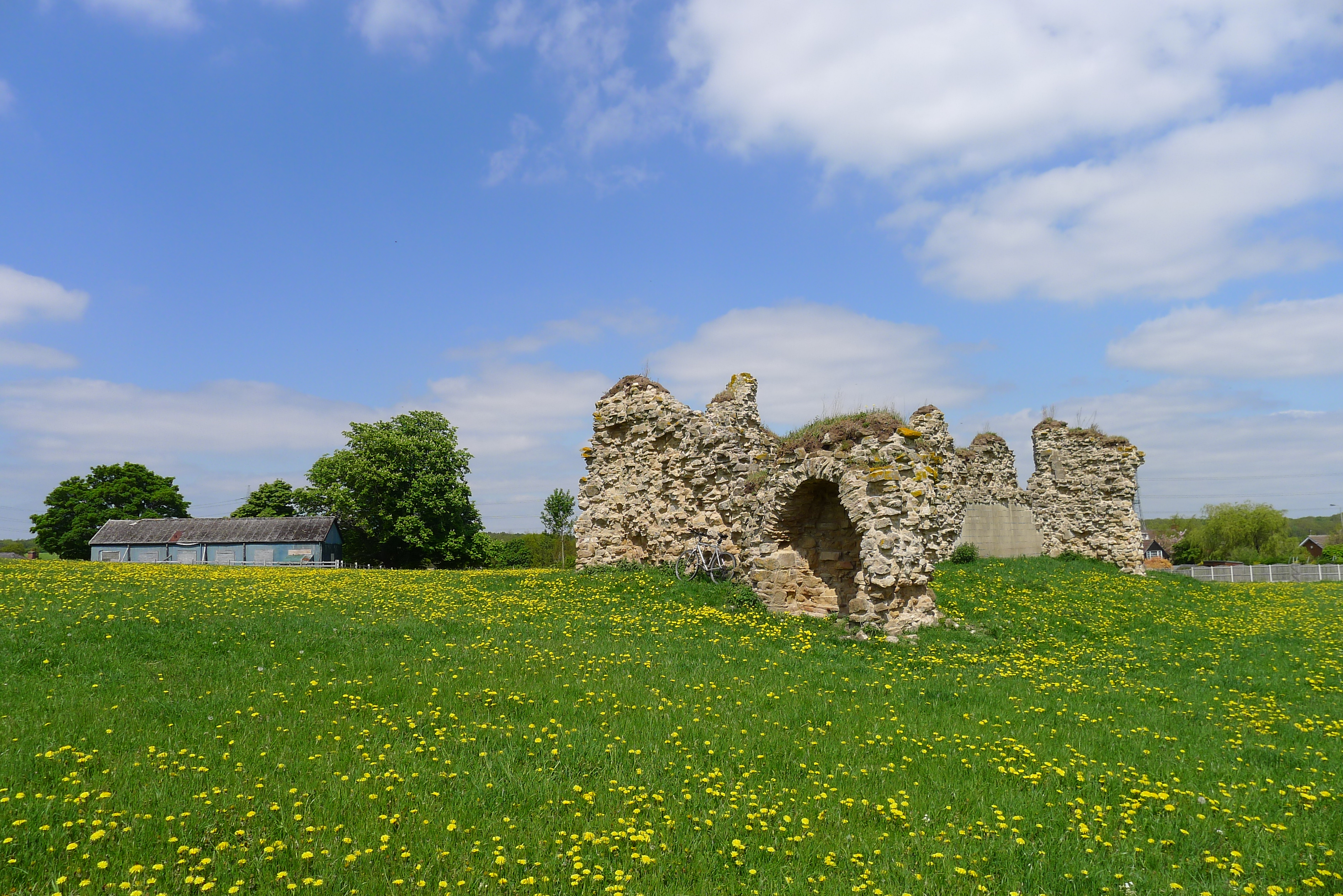
- The Dog and Duck King John's Palace

- Location within Nottinghamshire
- Interactive map of Kings Clipstone
- Area: 4.89 sq mi (12.7 km^{2})
- Population: 312 (2021 census)
  - Density: 64/sq mi (25/km^{2})
- Created: 2011
- OS grid reference: SK 60244 64799
  - London: 120 mi (190 km) SE
- District: Newark and Sherwood
- Shire county: Nottinghamshire
- Region: East Midlands
- Country: England
- Sovereign state: United Kingdom
- Settlements: Kings Clipstone; Gorsethorpe
- Post town: MANSFIELD
- Postcode district: NG21
- Dialling code: 01623
- Police: Nottinghamshire
- Fire: Nottinghamshire
- Ambulance: East Midlands
- Website: www.kingsclipstone.co.uk

Kings Clipstone is a village and civil parish, in the Newark and Sherwood district, in the county of Nottinghamshire, England. The parish lies in the west of the county, and north west within the district. It is 120 miles north of London, 15 miles north of the city of Nottingham, and 5 miles north east of the nearest market town of Mansfield. At the 2021 census, the parish had a population of 312. The parish touches Clipstone village, Edwinstowe, Rufford and Warsop. The parish was formerly part of the wider Clipstone parish, on 1 April 2011 it became a separate parish. The area is within Sherwood Forest, well known for the Robin Hood legend.

== Geography ==
=== Location ===
It is surrounded by the following local areas:

- Edwinstowe to the north
- Clipstone to the south
- Lidgett to the east
- Gorsethorpe and Market Warsop to the west.

The B6030 Mansfield to Rufford road runs through the parish, with a minor road that branches off within the village and routes towards Market Warsop.

=== Settlements ===
The parish consists of:

- Kings Clipstone, the core village
- Gorsethorpe, a hamlet, 2/3 mile (1 km) north west.

There are also several isolated local community areas comprising small clusters of farms and their auxiliary buildings, cottages and residences:

- Forestry Holdings, 1 mile (1.6 km) south of Kings Clipstone
- Cavendish Lodge, 2/3 mile (1 km) to the west
- Broomhill Grange, 3/4 mile (1.2 km), to the north
- Lamb Pens, 1 mile (1.6 km) to the north west
- Archway House, 2/3 mile (1.1 km) north east
- Eastfield Farm, 1/2 mile (0.9 km) north east

=== Landscape ===
Predominantly, many of the parish residents are clustered around King Clipstone village. Outside of this is a light scattering of farms, farmhouses, estate lodges and cottages amongst a wider mainly farmland setting. There are open fields to the west and north. There are scattered wooded areas throughout the parish, but much of the south contains a heavily forested portion of Sherwood Forest called Sherwood Pines Forest Park, with visitor facilities and attractions 0.81 miles (1.3 km) south of the village.

==== Water features ====
- The River Maun forms part of the west boundary, and runs through the centre of the parish, passing close to the core village area.
- Vicar Water is a stream which flows into the Maun north of the main village.

==== Land elevation ====
The banks of the water features are the lowest areas in the parish, at approximately 60 metres (200 ft). The village is a little higher than this at 65–75 metres (213–246 ft). Peaks over 100 metres (330 ft) are found in the south within Sherwood Pines, and in the north by Windmill Planation/Bradmer Hill where the A6075 and B6035 meet by the boundary. The highest point is 116 metres (381 ft) along the west border with Mansfield district, close to the Parliament Oak and another notable vintage tree, Old Churn Oak.

== History ==
=== Etymology ===
The earliest historical reference to the settlement is in the Domesday Book of 1086, where the village is mentioned as "Clipestune". Subsequent written sources use the forms "Clipestone", "Clippeston", "Clipiston". The place-name Clipstone seems to contain an Old Norse personal name, Klyppr, with tun (Old English), an enclosure or farmstead, so 'Klyppr's farm or settlement'.

King Edward I of England held a parliament at King John's Palace in 1290 "Clipiston Regis", and appeared on later maps as Kings Clipstone.

After its importance lessened it was known simply as Clipstone, and later Old Clipstone particularly after the nearby (New) Clipstone village was built for miners at the nearby colliery. The Old Clipstone community chose to revert to its medieval name after separating from Clipstone village parish in 2011.

=== Prehistoric period ===
The earliest date-able material from Clipstone is from the Bronze Age. These pieces of material were a spearhead and an arrowhead. There is also a suspected ring ditch in the vicinity of New Clipstone which is assumed to be a ploughed out round barrow.

The National Mapping Project data as provided by English Heritage shows a number of cropmarks recorded from aerial photography in the northern quarter of Kings Clipstone parish, representing rectilinear field systems associated with smaller stock enclosures and perhaps domestic sites. Typologically, and from their orientation, it is assumed that these are part of the brickwork plan field system from the late Iron Age, which stretches across the Sherwood Sandstones.

=== Roman period ===
Pottery of the period is known from Kings Clipstone due to Philip Rahtz's excavation in 1956 and Trent and Peak Archaeology's watching brief and fieldwalking in 1991, however the context of the finds has never been understood. There have also been metal detector finds within the parish of two Roman brooches and a small coin hoard and arrowhead. The adjacent parish of Mansfield Woodhouse contains a suspected Roman road (Leeming Lane), with an associated marching camp at Roman Bank. Further to the north-west a small villa site was exposed in 1780 by the antiquarian Major Hayman Rooke.

=== Early medieval period ===
Four pieces of late Saxon shelly ware pottery were recorded in 1991 during fieldwalking of Castlefield, although it is unlikely that these represent anything more than a background scatter associated with the manuring of the open fields. These four pieces of pottery are actually Potterhanworth Ware, dating to the 13th–15th century Prior to Domesday, the two manors of Kings Clipstone were held by Osbern and Ulsi and the value was set at 60 shillings (£3). Ulsi in particular was a reasonably wealthy landowner and held manors at Greasley, Strelley, Sutton and Hodsock.

=== Domesday ===
The landowner by 1086 was Roger de Busli, one of the great Norman landowners who held 163 estates in Nottinghamshire, Derbyshire and south Yorkshire.

=== King John's Palace & Parliament Oak ===
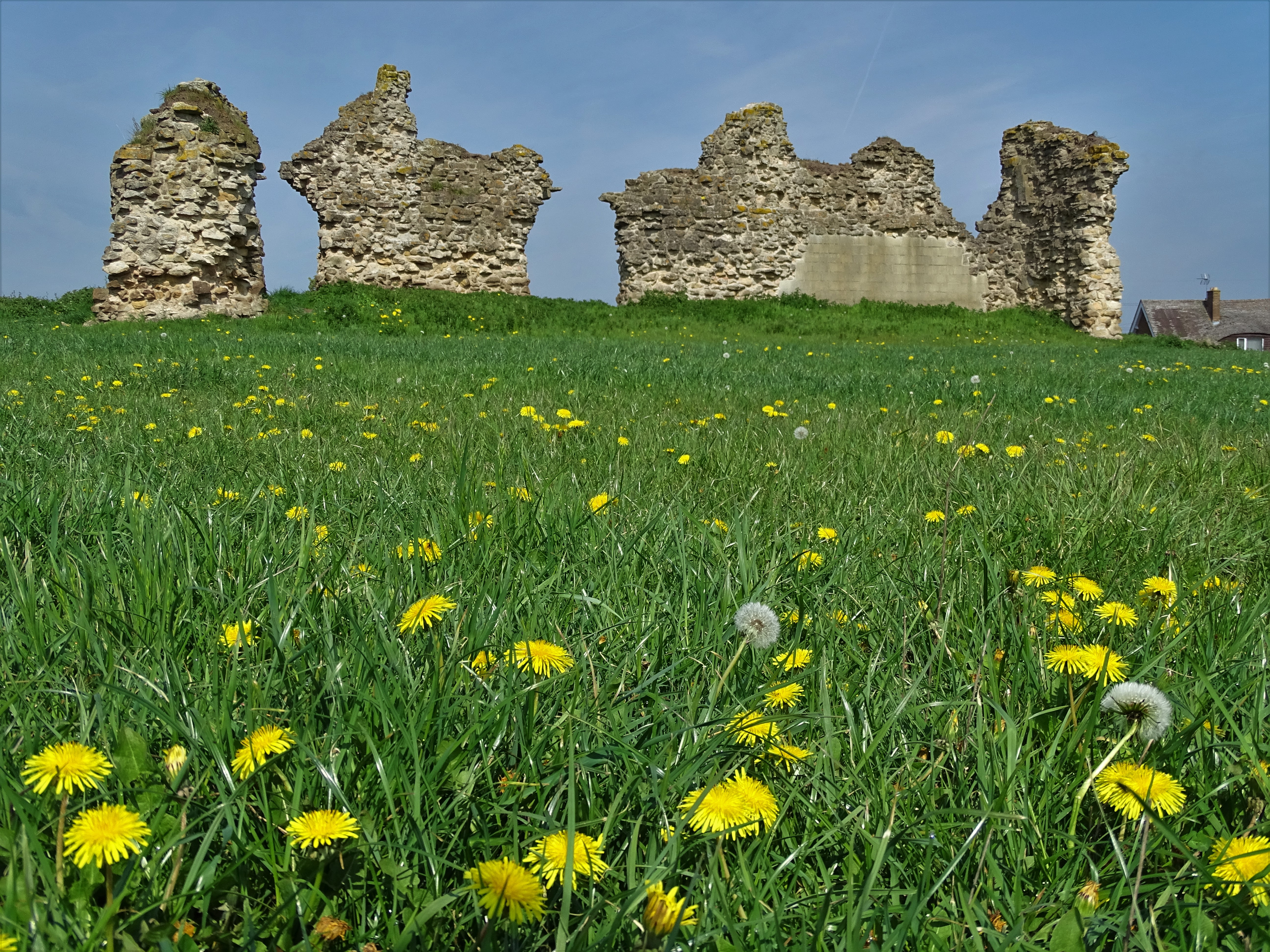
Ruins of King John's Palace, Kings Clipstone

King John's Palace is the ruined walls of a former medieval royal residence previously used for hunting trips into Sherwood Forest. While there is no conclusive proof of the medieval royal residence being built by King John of England, there were known to be 1400 acres of forested deer park (and 70 acres of rabbit warrens) next to the village, which were used by royal hunting parties. It became a large palace complex and was visited by all the Plantagenet Kings from King Henry II in 1181 to King Richard II in 1393. By the 13th Century the palace grounds were the largest in the country covering seven acres. The buildings were in an area which was enclosed in 1180 to help contain the deer for which it was attractive for hunting. This was also the location of the Great Pond which contained fish and wildfowl (in modern times it is locally called the Dog and Duck Meadow). Moreover, it is said that King John held a parliament at the nearby Parliament Oak in 1212, and also King Edward I in 1290.

=== Clipstone Hall ===
A new manor house in the village was built at some point after the Palace had fallen into complete disrepair. A mention of the ‘site of the late castle’ in 1568 suggests that the palace had been demolished. It seems possible that a new manor house had been built with stone from the palace on Squires Lane. On 11 March 1603, King James I of Scotland granted the manor of Clipstone to Lord Mountjoy (the Battle of Kinsale victor in 1601), the 7th Earl Shrewsbury. From that time, the estates remained in the same family for 350 years, passing from Shrewsbury to the Dukes of Newcastle and Portland through marriage or death. The Hall eventually succumbed to the same fate as the palace, and by 1710 it was in a state of disrepair with stone was being reused for other buildings. By 1844 a blacksmiths' premises was in operation on top of the remains of the Hall.

=== Modern industrialisation ===
George Sitwell, an ironmaster, mined iron locally and built a furnace here in the 17th century. Much of the local forest was cut down to provide charcoal as fuel.

=== Clipstone riots ===
In 1767 the Duke of Portland was involved in a number of prosecutions of local people for entering the forest park and causing disorders. Local labourers reacted by starting riots.

=== Water meadows ===
The quality of the local soil is poor and in 1832 the village was unfavourably described as in a state of disrepair. The 4th Duke of Portland was determined to improve the productivity of his land, and built a flood dyke system. The scheme became known as the ‘Water Meadows of Clipstone’ and was constructed between 1819 and 1837. It was a huge undertaking, being 7.5 miles long and covering 300 acres. The flood dykes significantly improved the fertility, enhancing the agricultural potential of the area. During the 1930s mining subsidence changed the levels of the dykes and the system was discontinued in the 1960s. The only channel to remain is in the meadow alongside the Dog and Duck public house.

=== Clipstone camp - New Clipstone ===
Located on what was to become Clipstone Colliery, Clipstone Training Camp was established when work on the mine area, started in 1912, was abandoned following the outbreak of the First World War.

=== Clipstone colliery ===
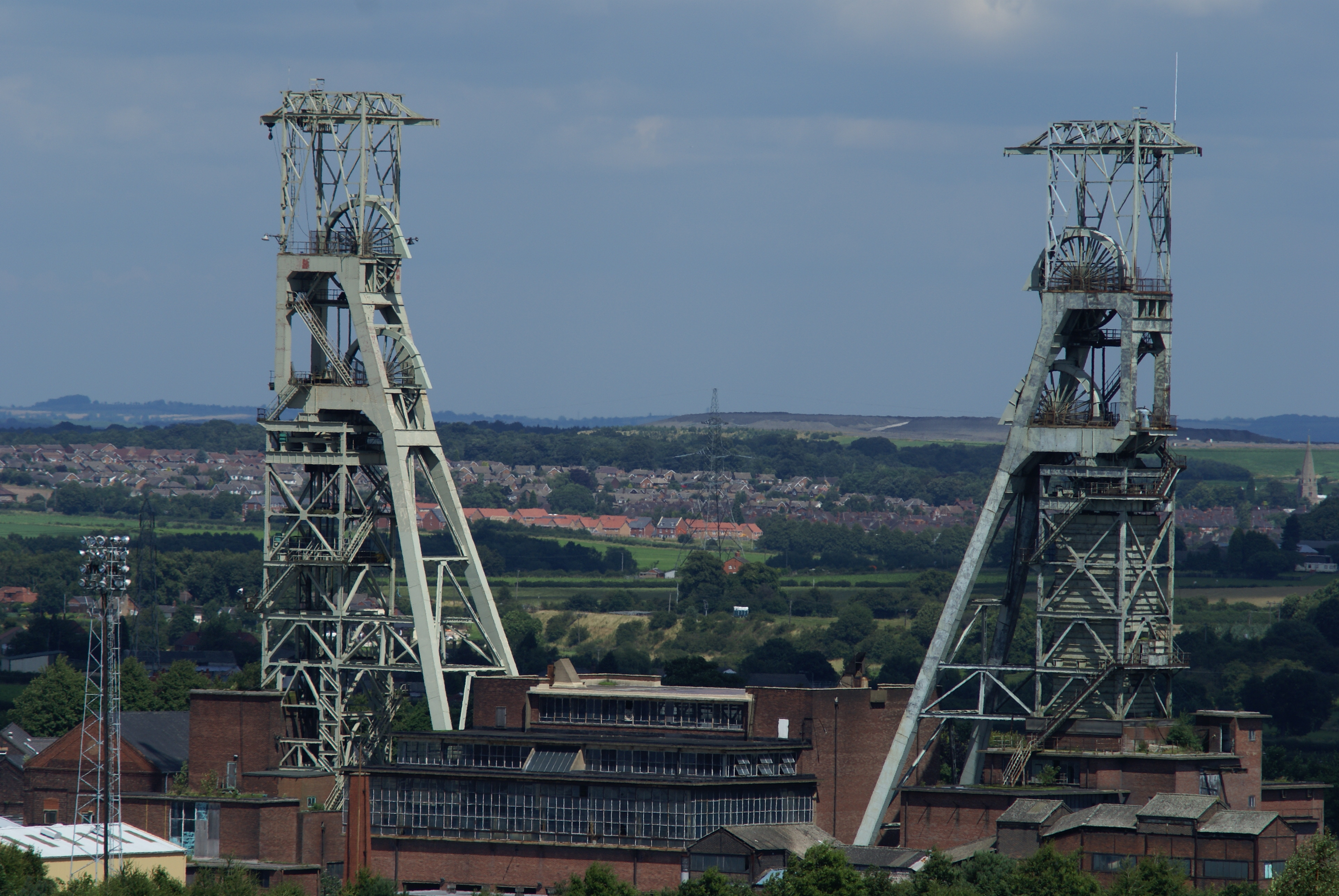
Headstocks at Clipstone Colliery

Although Clipstone Colliery is close by, it is outside the village of Kings Clipstone. The colliery was built in the wider historic Clipstone parish and opened in 1922. The mine closed in April 2003. Since 1993 it had been owned by RJB Mining (now UK Coal). The present headstocks, Grade II listed structures, were at the time of completion in 1953 the tallest in Europe.

=== Post WWII ===
Until 1945 there were no private houses in the village, most of the cottages were for estate workers and owned by the Welbeck estate. However, following the death of the Duke of Portland in 1943, death duties forced the sale of the properties in May 1945.

=== Parish partition ===
A desire by the community to be more identifiable so as to address a number of local needs, culminated in a formal request to diverge from the New Clipstone village administratively, and form a parish from the then district ward area for Old Clipstone, both villages at the time within the wider parish of Clipstone. The village was renamed in 2003 to King Clipstone and following a public consultation ending in March 2010, the request was granted and enacted by the district council in April 2011, creating an encompassing civil parish of the same name.

== Community ==
There is one public house, The Dog and Duck. Kings Clipstone Brewery has operated within the village since 2012.

=== Sherwood Pines Forest Park ===
The forest was part of ancient Sherwood Forest, originally called Clipstone Heath. The Forestry Commission was set up by the government in 1919 in response to a shortage of wood and in 1925 they obtained a 999-year lease at the park from the Welbeck and Rufford estates to plant and harvest trees, originally for war purposes, with the aims of the body becoming more preservation and leisure orientated in later years. Sherwood Pines Forest Park is run as a non-profit visitor attraction by the Forestry England.

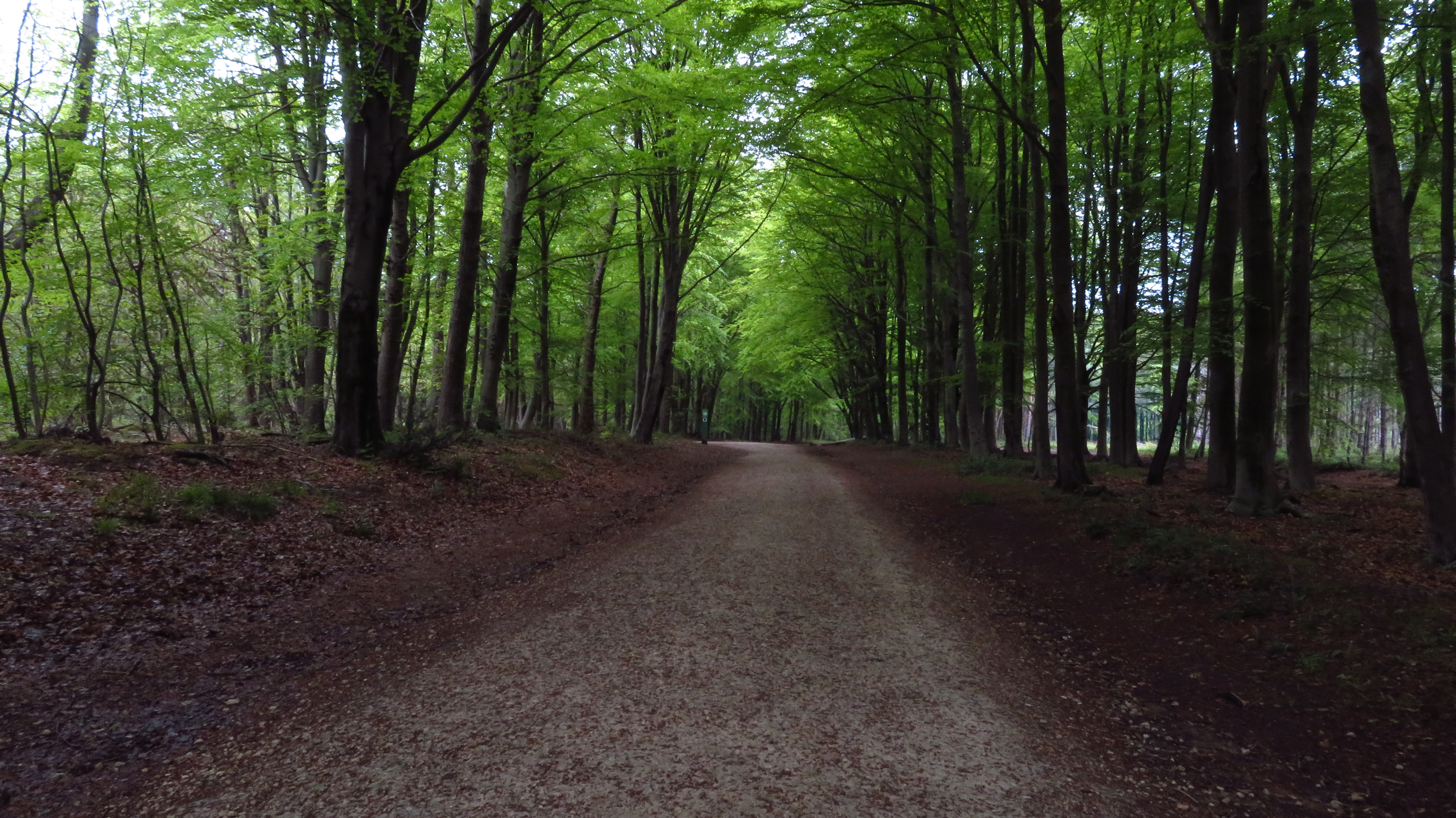
Sherwood Pines Forest Park

== Governance and demography ==
The area is managed at the first level of public administration by Kings Clipstone Parish Council.

At district level, the wider area is managed by Newark and Sherwood District Council, and by Nottinghamshire County Council at its highest tier.

In the census of 2011 the parish had a population of 318. and this decreased to 312 in 2021.

== Landmarks ==
=== Heritage buildings and locations ===
There are two protected sites in Kings Clipstone, King John's Palace is the most notable as a scheduled monument. Archway House is a listed building at Grade II, and was built as a hunting lodge in 1844 for the Duke of Portland. It later became a school and is presently split into two private residences.

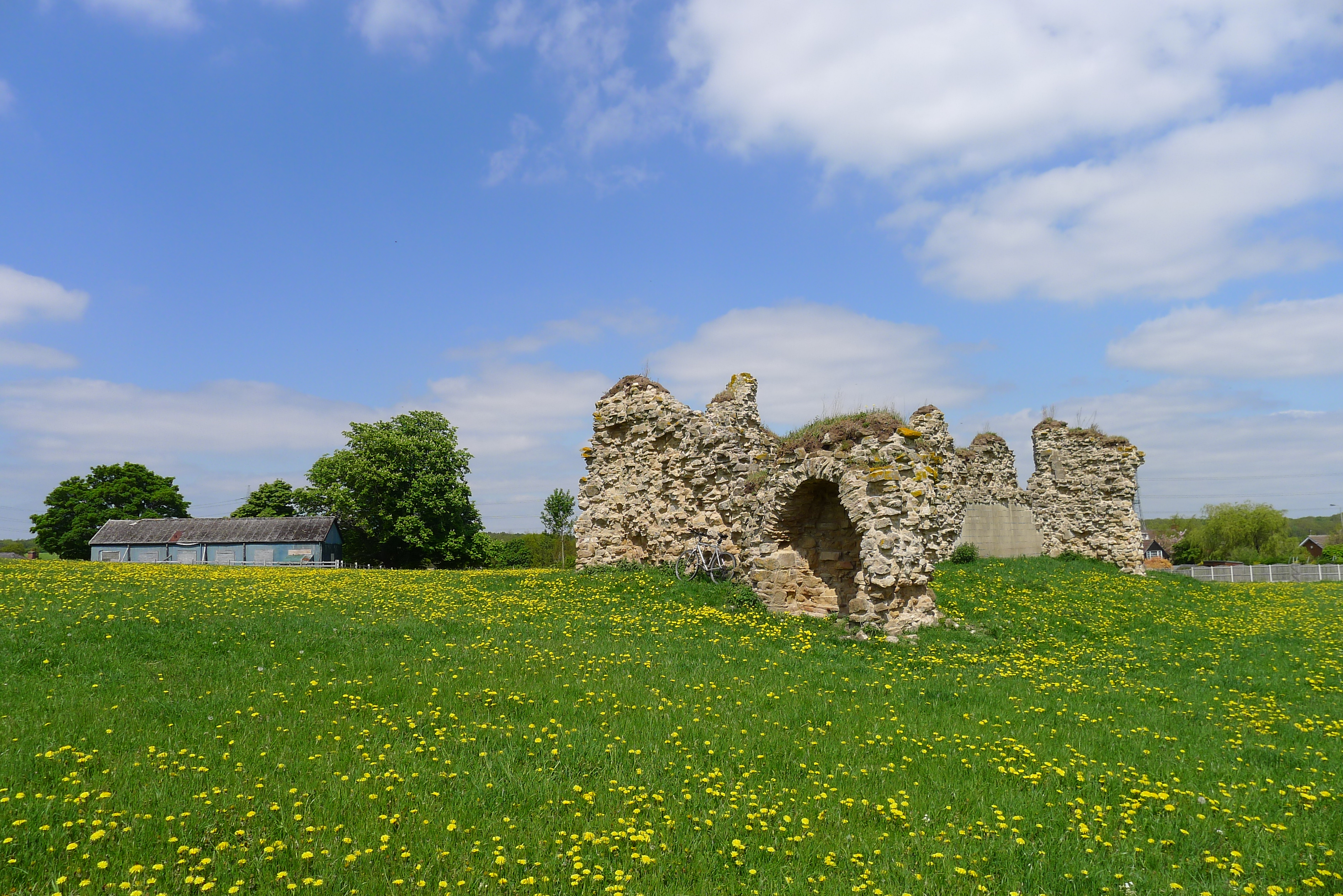
King Johns Palace, Kings Clipstone

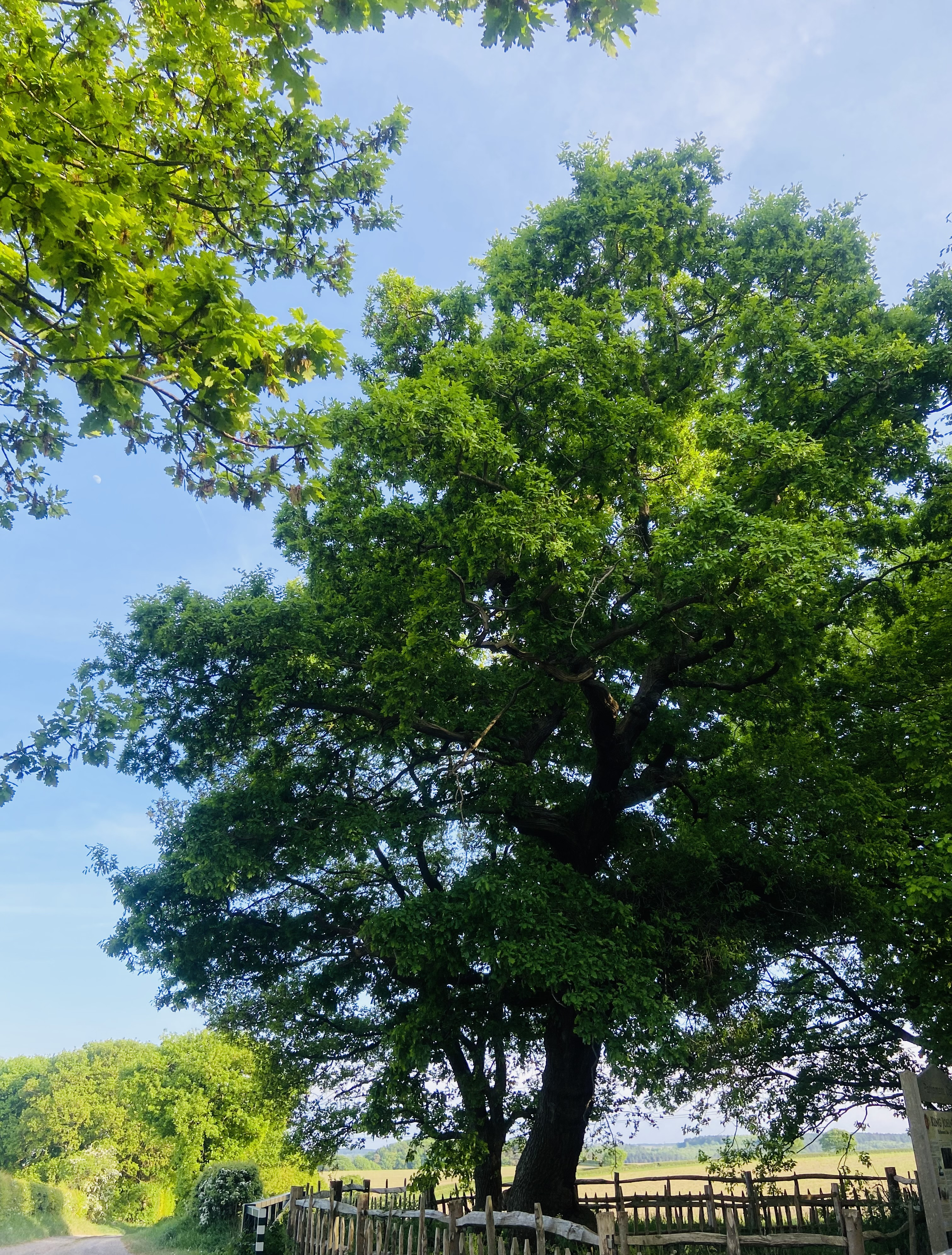
Parliament Oak near King John’s Palace

== Sport and leisure ==
The long distance Robin Hood Way path and Route 6 of the National Cycle Network pass through the north and east of the parish.

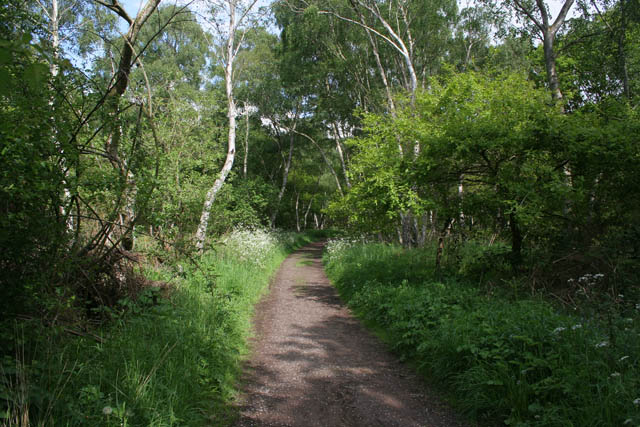
Robin Hoods Way

Sherwood Forest Holiday Park is a campsite location 1 mile north west of the village.

Sherwood Forest Miniature Railway is sited on the former 'water meadows' land used as an irrigation scheme to improve crop yield.

There is a motocross track which hosts regular outdoor biking events, on Gorsethorpe Road. It opened in 2017.

=== Sherwood Pines ===
Sherwood Pines Forest Park is presently run as a non-profit visitor attraction by the Forestry Commission. Activities within the forest include:

- Visitor centre
- Walking, cycling, mountain biking
- Parkrun
- Orienteering
- Bushcraft
- A cafe
- Children's adventure trail
- Tree climbing
- Ranger activities
- Segway
- Robin Hood hideout and a raised walkway and courses
- Occasional live act events

== Transport ==
The High Marnham track run by Network Rail passes to the north of the village. This reuses the former LNER railway line that ran between Warsop and Ollerton Station. There was previously a Clipstone railway station along this route just south of Gorsethorpe, primarily for goods which was closed completely in 2003. A branch line from this went to Clipstone Colliery from a junction which was 1/3 mile (2,000 ft) north east of the village, and further on to Mansfield.
