= Michael Lewis (archaeologist) =

British archaeologist

Michael Lewis FSA
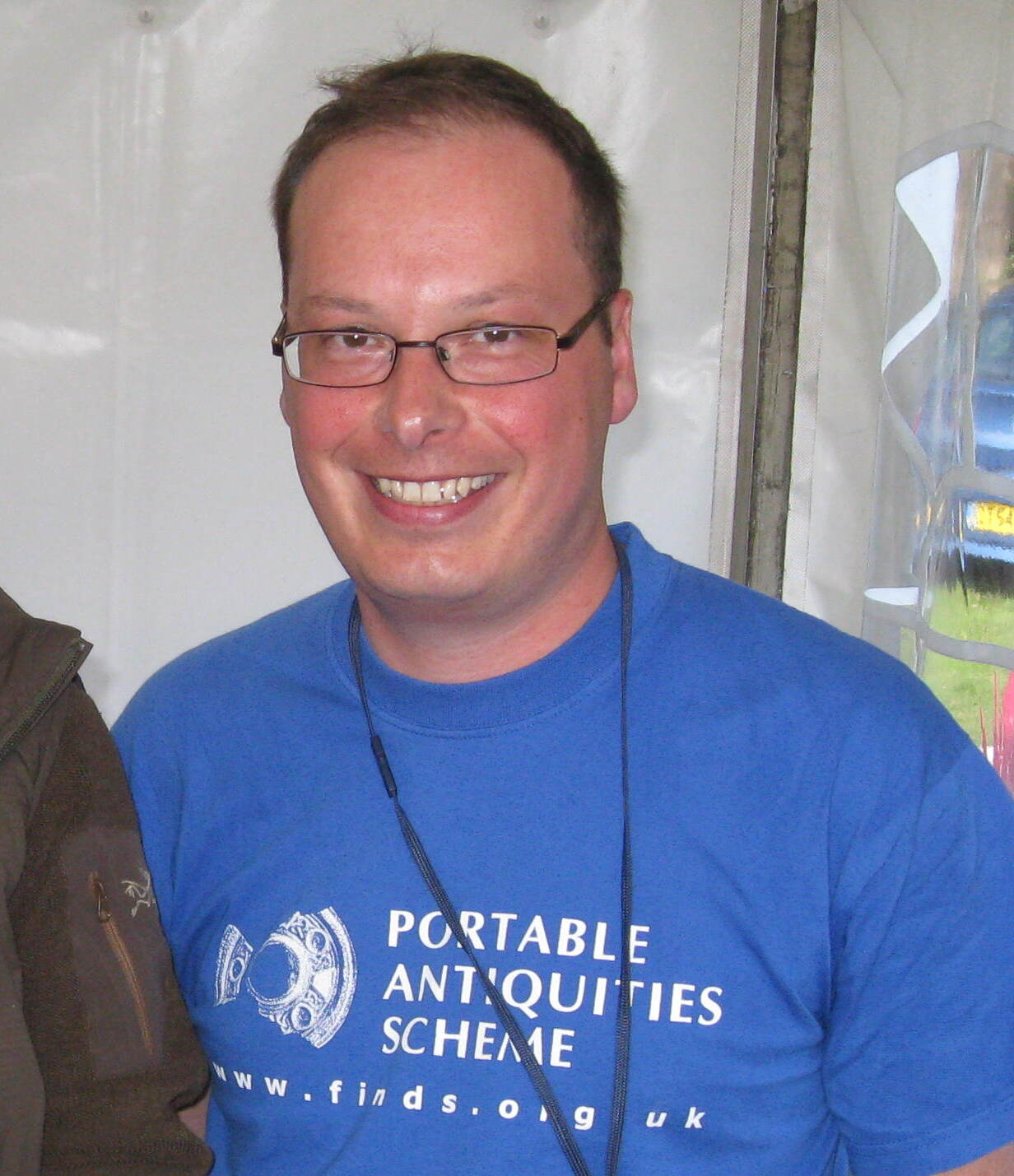
- Lewis in 2010
- Born: Michael John Lewis

Academic background
- Education: University of Kent
- Thesis: "The Archaeological Authority of the Bayeux Tapestry" (2004)

Academic work
- Discipline: Archaeology
- Sub-discipline: Medieval archaeology
- Institutions: British Museum; Portable Antiquities Scheme; University of York; University of Reading

Michael John Lewis FSA is lead Curator of the British Museum’s Bayeux Tapestry Exhibition, previously Head of the Portable Antiquities Scheme.

== Career ==
Lewis studied at the University of Surrey (Roehampton) and the University of York before researching his PhD at the University of Kent, completed in 2004. He was head of the Portable Antiquities Scheme between 2015 and 2025. Lewis is a visiting professor at the university of Exeter, Helsinki and Reading.

Between 2012 and 2017 Lewis was a special constable with the Metropolitan Police Art & Antiques Unit.

He was elected as a Fellow of the Society of Antiquaries of London on 4 April 2006. He is Liveryman of the Worshipful Company of Art Scholars and an adviser to the All Party Parliamentary Archaeology Group.

== Select publications ==
- with P. Deckers & S. Thomas. 2016. Aspects of Non-Professional Metal Detecting in Europe. Open Archaeology.
- with N. Speakman 2016. Los Pilares de Europa: la edad media en el British Museum. British Museum/ObraSocial la Caixa.
- 2014. Saints and their Badges: saints’ lives and medieval pilgrim badge. Greenlight publishing.
- with G. Owen-Crocker & D. Terkla. 2011. New Research on the Bayeux Tapestry: proceedings of aconference at the British Museum. Oxbow.
- with G. Egan, K. Leahy, J. Naylor & S. Worrell. 2010. A Decade of Discovery: proceedings of the Portable Antiquities Scheme Conference 2007. British Archaeological Reports
- 2008.. The Real World of the Bayeux Tapestry. The History Press.
