= Sherwood Pines Forest Park =

Park in Nottinghamshire, England

Sherwood Pines
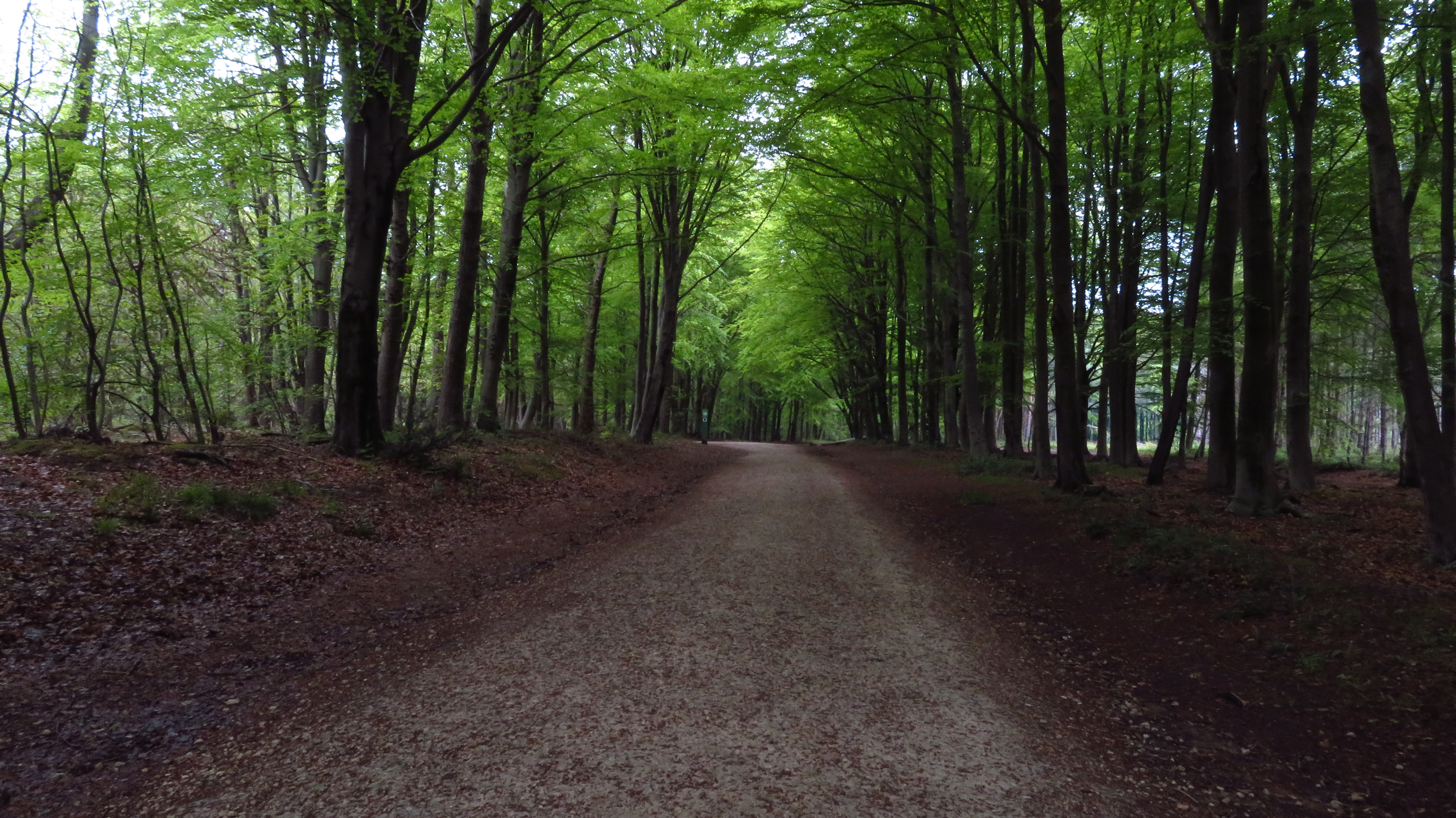
- A path through the Culloden Plantation
- Type: Forest park
- Location: Kings Clipstone, Mansfield, Nottinghamshire, NG21 9JL England
- Area: 3,300 acres (1,300 ha)
- Created: 1993
- Operator: Forestry England
- Open: All year
- Website: Sherwood Pines

Sherwood Pines Forest Park is a forest park located near the village of Kings Clipstone, Nottinghamshire, England. Originally called Clipstone Heath, it was acquired by Forestry England in 1925 and planted with trees in response to a wood shortage after World War I. The park offers activities such as walking, bushcraft, mountain biking and there is a visitor centre. It is the largest park in the East Midlands of England. The forest is also home to the average point between the geographical centres and population centres of Great Britain.

== History ==
The forest was part of ancient Sherwood Forest, originally called Clipstone Heath it was replanted with pine trees by Forestry England and renamed Sherwood Pines. There are the remains of Mansfield's 18th century main coach road leading to the Great North Road, and a medieval route from Kings Clipstone to Bilsthorpe, some of the medieval heath land and shroggs survive. Ancient boundary markers remain such as Robin Hood's Whetstone. There are the remains of a First World War pistol range and training trench. In 1630 the area was dominated by rabbit warrens. Feeding by the large number of rabbits had caused the land to become scrubby and in the Victorian era rabbits were killed and sent daily to London by train. Forestry England was set up by the government in 1919 in response to a shortage of wood and in 1925 they obtained a 999-year lease at the park to plant and harvest trees.

== Facilities ==
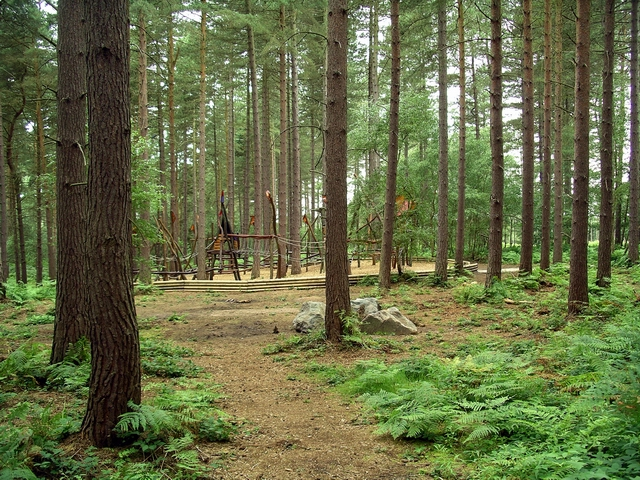
The adventure playground

The forest offers a visitor centre, walking, cycling, mountain biking, jogging, a parkrun, orienteering, bushcraft, a cafe, a children's adventure trail, tree climbing, ranger activities, segway, a Robin Hood hideout and a raised walkway. It is the largest park in the East Midlands of England, with an area of 3,300 acres. trees: Corsican pine, Scots pine, Red oak, beach
