= Festival of Archaeology =

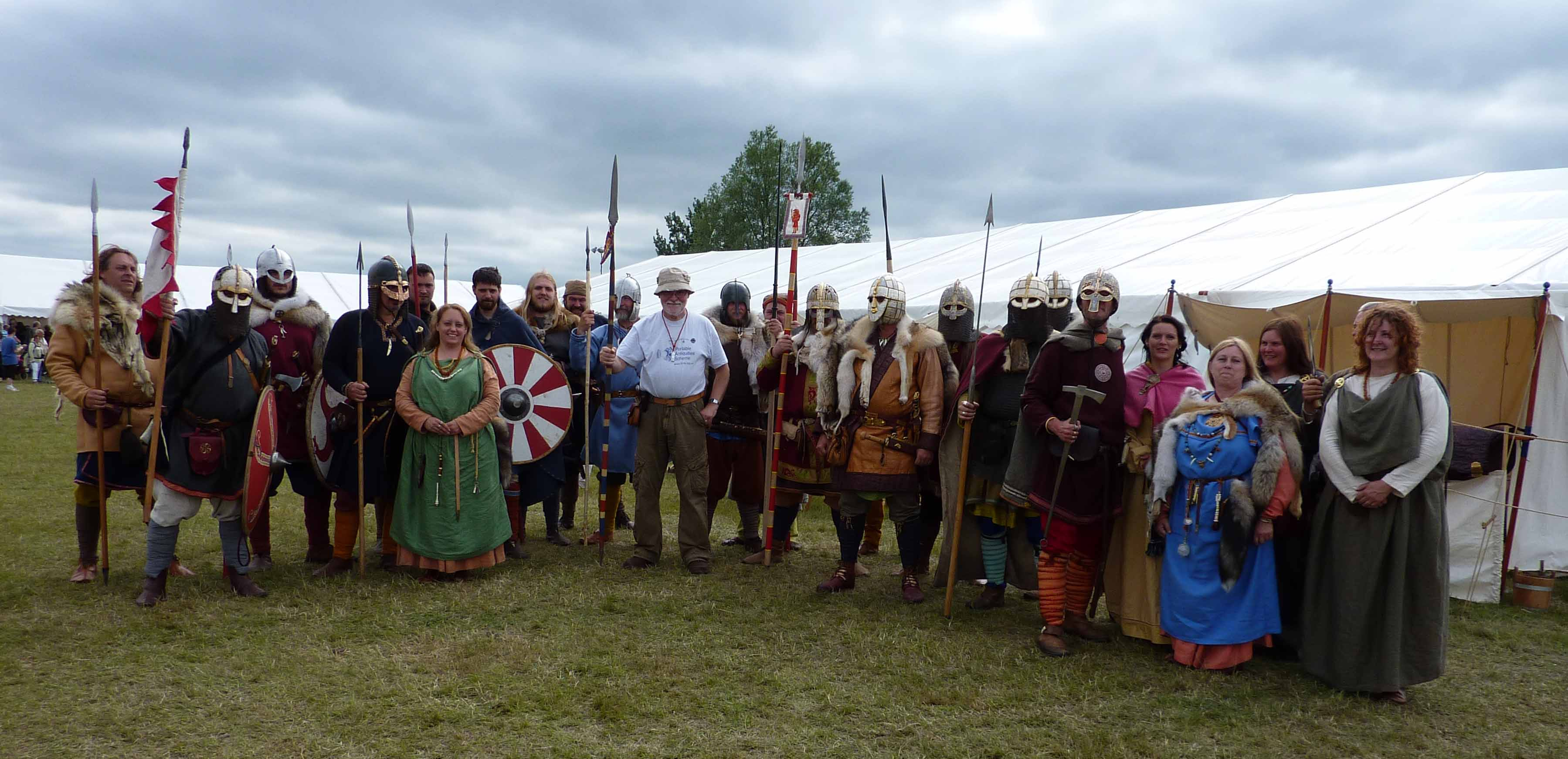
Festival 2010

The Festival of Archaeology is a fortnight-long festival coordinated by the Council for British Archaeology (CBA). It is an annual UK-wide festival, during which events take place across England, Wales, Scotland and Northern Ireland.

== History ==
The festival began in 1990 as National Archaeology Day, for which 10 events were held. Initially it was linked in with European Heritage Days in September of each year. However, feedback from participants led to a decision by the Council for British Archaeology to separate from European Heritage Days and to move the event to July in order make the most of the fieldwork opportunities during the summer.

The festival increased to a weekend-long event in 2003 with 195 events, and in 2005 became a nine-day festival under the name National Archaeology Week. The Council for British Archaeology has now renamed National Archaeology Week as the Festival of Archaeology. Each year the festival will take place in July.

Since 2020 it is linked with the European Archaeology Days overseen by Inrap (French National Institute for Preventive Archaeological Research) under the aegis of the French Ministry of Culture

== Aims ==
The festival is centred on the Council for British Archaeology's aim of widening participation in archaeology by encouraging people to visit sites of archaeological and historical interest, such as museums, heritage sites, and resource centres.

== Events ==
Events are held locally and nationally by a wide variety of groups and societies. Events range from small local events to larger countywide events, and focus on different aspects of British Archaeology. The CBA coordinates the overall festival, but individual groups and societies are able to produce their own events locally and generate publicity for their events and groups. A number of other events run during the year to promote archaeology and history (see list below). In 2011 and 2013 the festival included the Day of Archaeology

== Profile and media coverage ==
The profile of the Festival of Archaeology has grown in recent years. The festival has received national media coverage in newspapers such as The Guardian and The Telegraph and featured on BBC1's The One Show in 2007. High-profile figures such as Barbara Follett, Phil Harding, and Julian Richards have been involved with the festival. In 2008 the children's magazine The Beano featured the Festival of Archaeology on their front cover.

== Related events ==
- European Heritage Days
- Heritage Open Days
- Journées nationales de l'archéologie
