= Sally Worrell =

British archaeologist

Sally Worrell FSA
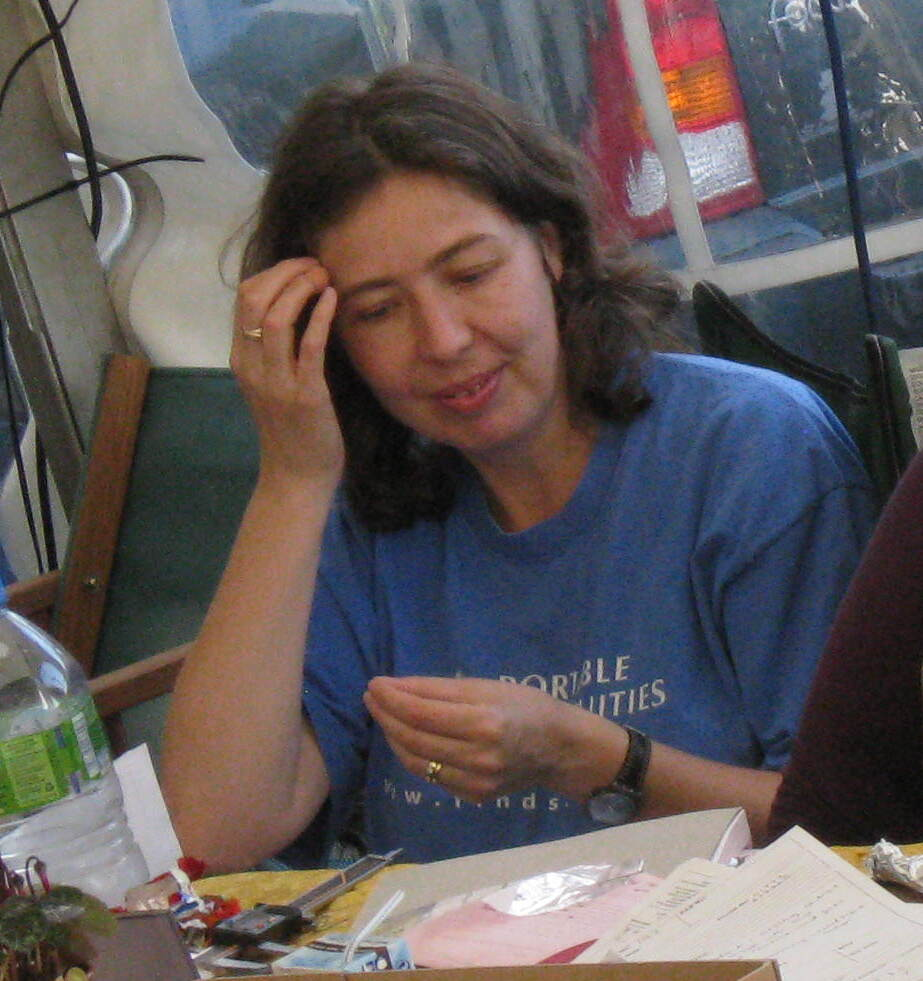
- Worrell at a finds table in 2010

Academic work
- Discipline: Archaeology
- Sub-discipline: Ancient Rome; Roman Britain
- Institutions: Portable Antiquities Scheme; University College London

Sally Ann Worrell FSA is a British archaeologist specialising in Romano-British material culture.

== Education ==
Worrel studied at Durham University, graduating with a Bachelor of Arts (BA) degree in 1994 and a Master of Arts (MA) degree in 1997.

== Career ==
Worrell is a Senior Research Associate at University College London, having joined the university in May 2003. Worrell worked as the Finds Liaison Officer for Hampshire for the Portable Antiquities Scheme before taking up the role of National Finds Adviser (Prehistoric, Iron Age, and Roman Artefacts) there. Whilst working as FLO for Hampshire she appeared in an episode of Time Team.

Since 2003 she has contributed to the annual reporting of Romano-British metal detected finds to the journal Britannia.

She was elected as a Fellow of the Society of Antiquaries of London on 3 March 2007.

== Select publications ==
- Worrell, S. 1997. Marton, North Lincolnshire: a Romano-British settlement in its context.
- Worrell, Sally; Jackson, Ralph; Mackay, Andrew; Bland, Roger; Pitts, Mike & Bradbury, Darren (January–February 2011). "The Crosby Garrett Roman Helmet". British Archaeology (116). Archived from the original on 1 February 2014.
- Hill, J. D., La Niece, S., Spence, A. and Worrell, S. 2004. "The Winchester Hoard: a find of unique Iron Age gold jewellery from southern England", Antiquaries Journal 84, 1-22.
