= Blog Action Day =

Annual worldwide event

Blog Action Day is an annual worldwide event where bloggers write about a single topic on November 3 or 4th of every year. The event commenced in 2007 on the inaugural topic of the environment. Successive years have focused on poverty in 2008 and climate change in 2009. Many popular blogs have participated including the White House blog in 2009. The event has also attracted support from the United Nations Environment Programme.

== 2007: Environment ==
Blog Action Day was founded by three bloggers Collis Ta'eed, Cyan Ta'eed and Leo Babauta in 2007. The inaugural theme chosen was the environment. The event was hosted by Envato. 23,327 blog posts were published by 20,603 participating blogs including 19 of the Technorati Top 100 blogs at the time.

== 2008: Poverty ==
Blog Action Day 2008 was on the theme of poverty. 14,053 blog posts were published by 12,800 bloggers. BlogTalkRadio held a 12-hour talkathon for poverty relief. Elena Valenciano, Minister for the European Union was one prominent participant in 2008.

== 2009: Climate Change ==
Blog Action Day 2009 had new hosts: Change.org and was on the theme of climate change. Over 32,000 blog posts were published by 12,000 bloggers. Participants in 2009 included UK Prime Minister Gordon Brown and Google's Official Blog.

== 2010: Water ==
Blog Action Day 2010 is on the theme of Water.

== 2011: Food ==
Blog Action Day 2011 is on the theme of Food and will be on October 16, coordinating with World Food Day.

== 2012: The Power of We ==
The theme for 2012 is "The Power of We". This topic touches on the subjects of Community, Equality, Anti-Corruption and Freedom

The 2017 date is October 16.
